= 2018–19 FC Lviv season =

FC Lviv
2018–19 season
- President: Bohdan Kopytko
- Manager: Gilmar Tadeu da Silva (until 14 August 2018); Yuriy Bakalov (since 16 August 2018 until 8 April 2019); Bohdan Blavatskyi (since 16 April 2019)
- Stadium: Arena Lviv
- Ukrainian Premier League: 6th
- Ukrainian Cup: Quarterfinal
- Top goalscorer: League: Bruno Duarte (9); All: Bruno Duarte (9)

The 2018–19 season was 2nd season in the top Ukrainian football league for FC Lviv. Lviv competed in Premier League, Ukrainian Cup.

On completion of the 2017–18 Ukrainian Premier League season, Veres Rivne, who had moved their operations to Lviv during the season announced the merging with FC Lviv who competed in the 2017–18 Ukrainian Second League and retain their name. This is the first time of such "swap" that has occurred with a team from the Ukrainian Premier League. Its certification the club passed on 5 June 2018. Along with that the FFU certification committee is consulting with the UEFA in regards of the "clubs swap". On 6 June 2018 it was announced that it is too early speculate composition of the league for the next season as the UEFA will make its final decision by allowing or not participation of FC Lviv. It is possible that some of already relegated clubs might be given a second chance if UEFA will insist on impossibility of the Lviv-Veres team swap. On 12 June 2018 Ukrainian Premier League updated its website removing any mentioning of NK Veres Rivne ever competing in the league and its record being awarded to FC Lviv. More to the story, in interview to "Tribuna" a head of the FFU Attestation Committee Viktor Bezsmernyi explained that it was Veres that received certificate for the 2018-19 Ukrainian Premier League and then the club changed its name. At same time the old-new president of Veres Khakhlyov demonstrated the club's certificate for the 2018-19 Ukrainian Second League.

== Players ==
=== Squad information ===
As of 31 May 2019

Squad no.	Name	Nationality	Position	Date of birth (age)
Goalkeepers
23	Bohdan Sarnavskyi	(Ukraine)	GK	29 January 1995 (aged 24)
31	Oleksandr Bandura (Captain)	(Ukraine)	GK	30 May 1986 (aged 33)
Defenders
3	Volodymyr Adamyuk	(Ukraine)	DF	17 July 1991 (aged 27)
5	Vladyslav Pryimak	(Ukraine)	DF	30 August 1996 (aged 22)
13	Oleksandr Nasonov	(Ukraine)	DF	28 April 1992 (aged 27)
20	Maksym Brama ^{List B}	(Ukraine)	DF	1 February 2002 (aged 17)
33	Serhiy Borzenko	(Ukraine)	DF	22 June 1986 (aged 32)
67	Vadym Paramonov	(Ukraine)	DF	18 March 1991 (aged 28)
Midfielders
4	Cadina ^{List B}	(Brazil)	MF	27 January 1997 (aged 22)
6	Pedro Vitor ^{List B}	(Brazil)	MF	20 March 1998 (aged 21)
9	Bruno Duarte	(Brazil)	MF	24 March 1996 (aged 23)
10	Lipe Veloso ^{List B}	(Brazil)	MF	7 April 1997 (aged 22)
17	Maksym Khimchak ^{List B}	(Ukraine)	MF	13 February 2000 (aged 19)
30	Jonatan Lima	(Brazil)	MF	4 January 1992 (aged 27)
32	Vicente	(Brazil)	MF	2 March 1996 (aged 23)
55	Dmytro Penteleychuk ^{List B}	(Ukraine)	MF	9 August 2000 (aged 18)
74	Marthã ^{List B}	(Brazil)	MF	20 June 1997 (aged 21)
96	Rafael Sabino	(Brazil)	MF	17 June 1996 (aged 22)
Forwards
7	Kauê ^{List B} (on loan from Palmeiras)	(Brazil)	FW	4 January 1997 (aged 22)
11	Pernambuco ^{List B}	(Brazil)	FW	28 April 1998 (aged 21)
16	Alvaro	(Brazil)	FW	10 March 1995 (aged 24)
22	Yuriy Ivanochko ^{List B}	(Ukraine)	FW	4 April 1998 (aged 21)
97	China	(Brazil)	FW	2 August 1996 (aged 22)

== Transfers ==
=== In ===
Date	Pos.	Player	Age	Moving from	Type	Fee	Source
Summer
1 June 2018	GK	(Ukraine) Oleksandr Bandura	32	(Ukraine) Veres Rivne	Transfer	Free	^{(1)}
1 June 2018	GK	(Ukraine) Bohdan Sarnavskyi	23	(Ukraine) Veres Rivne	Transfer	Free	^{(1)}
1 June 2018	DF	(Ukraine) Volodymyr Adamyuk	26	(Ukraine) Veres Rivne	Transfer	Free	^{(1)}
1 June 2018	DF	(Ukraine) Serhiy Borzenko	32	(Ukraine) Veres Rivne	Transfer	Free	^{(1)}
1 June 2018	DF	(Ukraine) Volodymyr Domnitsak	22	(Ukraine) Veres Rivne	Transfer	Free	^{(1)}
1 June 2018	DF	(Ukraine) Vladyslav Pryimak	21	(Ukraine) Veres Rivne	Transfer	Free	^{(1)}
1 June 2018	DF	(Ukraine) Serhiy Siminin	30	(Ukraine) Veres Rivne	Transfer	Free	^{(1)}
1 June 2018	DF	(Ukraine) Artur Zapadnya	28	(Ukraine) Veres Rivne	Transfer	Free	^{(1)}
1 June 2018	MF	(Ukraine) Yuriy Ivanochko	20	(Ukraine) Veres Rivne	Transfer	Free	^{(1)}
1 June 2018	MF	(Ukraine) Maksym Kalenchuk	28	(Ukraine) Veres Rivne	Transfer	Free	^{(1)}
1 June 2018	MF	(Ukraine) Ivan Pavliukh	21	(Ukraine) Veres Rivne	Transfer	Free	^{(1)}
1 June 2018	MF	(Ukraine) Rostyslav Voloshynovych	27	(Ukraine) Veres Rivne	Transfer	Free	^{(1)}
1 June 2018	FW	(Brazil) Julio Cesar	23	(Ukraine) Veres Rivne	Transfer	Free	^{(1)}
1 June 2018	FW	(Ukraine) Vitaliy Mykytyn	19	(Ukraine) Veres Rivne	Transfer	Free	^{(1)}
1 June 2018	FW	(Ukraine) Ruslan Stepanyuk	26	(Ukraine) Veres Rivne	Transfer	Free	^{(1)}
13 July 2018	FW	(Brazil) Bruno Duarte da Silva	22	(Brazil) Portuguesa	Transfer	Undisclosed	
13 July 2018	FW	(Brazil) Panambi	23	Unattached	Transfer	Free	
15 July 2018	DF	(Ukraine) Oleksandr Holikov	26	(Ukraine) FC Poltava	Transfer	Free	
15 July 2018	MF	(Brazil) Augusto	26	Unattached	Transfer	Free	
20 July 2018	GK	(Ukraine) Bohdan Druz	20	(Ukraine) UFC Olimpik Kharkiv	Transfer	Free	
20 July 2018	DF	(Ukraine) Vadym Paramonov	27	(Ukraine) FC Poltava	Transfer	Free	
20 July 2018	DF	(Ukraine) Serhiy Voronin	31	(Ukraine) PFC Sumy	Transfer	Undisclosed	
20 July 2018	MF	(Brazil) Marthã	21	Unattached	Transfer	Free	
20 July 2018	MF	(Brazil) Rafael Sabino	22	(Brazil) Jaguariúna	Transfer	Undisclosed	
17 August 2018	MF	(Brazil) Jonatan Lima	26	(Brazil) Novorizontino	Transfer	Free	
31 August 2018	DF	(Ukraine) Vasyl Bilyi	28	(Ukraine) Rukh Vynnyky	Transfer	Undisclosed	
31 August 2018	DF	(Ukraine) Semen Datsenko	24	Unattached	Transfer	Free	
31 August 2018	FW	(Brazil) Araujo	20	Unattached	Transfer	Free	
3 September 2018	DF	(Ukraine) Yuriy Putrash	24	Unattached	Transfer	Free	
3 September 2018	FW	(Ukraine) Serhiy Petrov	24	(Ukraine) Zirka Kropyvnytskyi	Transfer	Undisclosed	
31 May 2018	DF	(Ukraine) Hlib Bukhal	22	(Ukraine) FC Oleksandriya	Loan return		
20 July 2018	DF	(Brazil) Lucas Taylor	23	(Brazil) Palmeiras	Loan		
Winter
19 February 2019	MF	(Brazil) Vicente	22	Unattached	Transfer	Free	
19 February 2019	FW	(Brazil) Alvaro	23	Unattached	Transfer	Free	
19 February 2019	FW	(Brazil) China	22	Unattached	Transfer	Free	
20 February 2019	DF	(Ukraine) Dmytro Fatyeyev	24	Unattached	Transfer	Free	
20 February 2019	FW	(Ukraine) Oleksandr Nasonov	26	(Ukraine) Arsenal Kyiv	Transfer	Free	
20 February 2019	MF	(Brazil) Pedro Vitor	20	(Greece) Aris Thessaloniki	Transfer	Free	
20 February 2019	MF	(Brazil) Lipe Veloso	21	(Japan) FC Tokyo	Transfer	Free	
20 February 2019	MF	(Brazil) Cadina	22	(Brazil) Barretos	Transfer	Free	
22 February 2019	FW	(Brazil) Pernambuco	20	Unattached	Transfer	Free	
21 February 2019	MF	(Brazil) Kauê	22	(Brazil) Palmeiras	Loan		

- ^(1) Players transferred from Veres Rivne as part of teams merger / swap.

=== Out ===
Date	Pos.	Player	Age	Moving to	Type	Fee	Source
Summer
2018	GK	(Ukraine) Roman Herych	21	(Ukraine) FC Kalush	Transfer	Undisclosed	
2018	DF	(Ukraine) Oleh Matushevskyi	21	(Ukraine) FC Kalush	Transfer	Undisclosed	
2018	GK	(Ukraine) Oleh Mizernyk	21	(Ukraine) Nyva Ternopil	Transfer	Undisclosed	
18 July 2018	DF	(Ukraine) Hlib Bukhal	22	(Ukraine) FC Oleksandriya	Transfer	Undisclosed	
19 July 2018	DF	(Ukraine) Serhiy Siminin	30	(Ukraine) Volyn Lutsk	Transfer	Undisclosed	
August 2018	FW	(Ukraine) Ruslan Stepanyuk	26	(Kazakhstan) FC Zhetysu	Transfer	Undisclosed	
26 October 2018	MF	(Ukraine) Maksym Kalenchuk	28	Unattached	Treansfer	Free	
October 2018	FW	(Brazil) Panambi	23	Unattached	Transfer	Free	
31 May 2018	GK	(Ukraine) Oleh Mozil	22	(Ukraine) Karpaty Lviv	Loan return		
Winter
1 January 2019	DF	(Ukraine) Vasyl Bilyi	28	Unattached	Transfer	Free	
1 January 2019	DF	(Ukraine) Volodymyr Domnitsak	23	Unattached	Transfer	Free	
1 January 2019	FW	(Ukraine) Serhiy Kyslenko	20	Unattached	Transfer	Free	
1 January 2019	FW	(Brazil) Julio Cesar	23	Unattached	Transfer	Free	
14 January 2019	DF	(Ukraine) Artur Zapadnya	28	(Ukraine) Volyn Lutsk	Transfer	Free	
14 January 2019	MF	(Ukraine) Rostyslav Voloshynovych	27	(Ukraine) Volyn Lutsk	Transfer	Free	
6 February 2019	FW	(Ukraine) Serhiy Petrov	21	(Ukraine) Rukh Vynnyky	Transfer	Free	
8 February 2019	DF	(Ukraine) Oleksandr Holikov	27	(Ukraine) FC Chornomorets Odesa	Transfer	Free	
8 February 2019	DF	(Ukraine) Yuriy Putrash	28	(Ukraine) FC Mynai	Transfer	Free	
26 March 2019	GK	(Ukraine) Bohdan Druz	20	(Ukraine) PFC Sumy	Transfer	Undisclosed	
9 April 2019	MF	(Ukraine) Vadym Yanchak	20	(Slovakia) Lokomotíva Košice	Transfer	Undisclosed	
17 April 2019	MF	(Brazil) Augusto	27	Unattached	Transfer	Free	
18 April 2019	DF	(Ukraine) Semen Datsenko	24	(Ukraine) Podillya Khmelnytskyi	Transfer	Free	
23 May 2019	DF	(Ukraine) Serhiy Voronin	32	Unattached	Transfer	Free	
26 May 2019	DF	(Ukraine) Dmytro Fatyeyev	24	Unattached	Transfer	Free	
1 April 2019	DF	(Brazil) Lucas Taylor	23	(Brazil) Palmeiras	Loan return		
March 2019	MF	(Brazil) Araujo	20	(Slovakia) Lokomotíva Košice	Loan		

== Pre-season and friendlies ==
15 June 2018 Friendly	FC Lviv (Ukraine)	13–0	(Ukraine) Zhupan Vynnyky	Lviv
17:00 EEST (UTC+03:00)	Stepanyuk; Myahkov; Kalenchuk; Julio Cesar; Ivanochko; Yanchak; Zaviyskyi	Report		Stadium: Progres Stadium

20 June 2018 Friendly	FC Lviv (Ukraine)	3–0	(Ukraine) FC Sambir	Slavske
17:00 EEST (UTC+03:00)	Goal	Report

23 June 2018 Friendly	FC Lviv (Ukraine)	4–0	(Ukraine) Karpaty Lviv U-21	Slavske
16:00 EEST (UTC+03:00)	Siminin (pen.)	Report

28 June 2018 Friendly	FC Lviv (Ukraine)	1–1	(Poland) Sandecja Nowy Sącz	Lviv
17:00 EEST (UTC+03:00)	7'	Report	Nowak 86'	Stadium: Skif Stadium

4 July 2018 Friendly	Volyn Lutsk (Ukraine)	3–4	(Ukraine) FC Lviv	Kamianytsia
17:00 EEST (UTC+03:00)	Goal	Report	Panambi 2'; Bruno 27', 65' (pen.); Julio Cesar 83'	Stadium: Kamelot

9 July 2018 Friendly	FC Lviv (Ukraine)	2–0	(Ukraine) MFC Mykolaiv	Lviv
17:00 EEST (UTC+03:00)	Panambi 1'; Augusto 90'	Report		Stadium: Skif Stadium

12 July 2018 Friendly	FC Lviv (Ukraine)	Cancelled	(Ukraine) Ahrobiznes Volochysk
EEST (UTC+03:00)		Report

14 July 2018 Friendly	Rukh Vynnyky (Ukraine)	1–1	(Ukraine) FC Lviv	Vynnyky
17:00 EEST (UTC+03:00)	Bilyi 13'	Report	Julio Cesar 34' (pen.)

15 July 2018 Friendly	FC Lviv (Ukraine)	Cancelled	(Ukraine) Obolon-Brovar Kyiv
EEST (UTC+03:00)		Report

8 September 2018 Friendly	Volyn Lutsk (Ukraine)	0–4	(Ukraine) FC Lviv	Lutsk
18:00 EEST (UTC+03:00)		Report	Bruno Duarte 7', 51'; Jonatan Lima 33'; Yanchak 87'	Stadium: Avanhard Stadium

23 January 2019 Friendly	FC Lviv (Ukraine)	0–3	(Hungary) MTK Budapest	Turkey
14:00 EET (UTC+02:00)		[ Report]	Torghelle 13', 42'; Lencse 83'

27 January 2019 Friendly	FC Lviv (Ukraine)	0–0	(Czech Republic) Baník Ostrava	Turkey
17:15 EET (UTC+02:00)		Report

2 February 2019 Friendly	FC Lviv (Ukraine)	0–0	(Serbia) Zemun	Turkey
EET (UTC+02:00)		Report

5 February 2019 Friendly	FC Lviv (Ukraine)	1–1	(Serbia) Mladost Lučani	Turkey
EET (UTC+02:00)	Haik 10'	Report	Bojović 72'

9 February 2019 Friendly	FC Lviv (Ukraine)	3–0	(Romania) Poli Timișoara	Turkey
EET (UTC+02:00)	Bandura 19' (pen.); 60'; 78'	Report

9 February 2019 Friendly	Dinamo Batumi (Georgia (country))	1–2	(Ukraine) FC Lviv	Turkey
EET (UTC+02:00)	Goal	Report	Lucas Taylor 40'; Bruno Duarte 55'

14 February 2019 Friendly	FC Lviv (Ukraine)	0–0	(Belarus) Rukh Brest	Turkey
EET (UTC+02:00)		Report

16 February 2019 Friendly	FC Lviv (Ukraine)	1–1	(South Korea) Pohang Steelers	Turkey
EET (UTC+02:00)	Bruno Duarte 80' (pen.)	Report	Goal

24 March 2019 Friendly	FC Lviv (Ukraine)	0–0	(Ukraine) Podillya Khmelnytskyi	Dobrotvir
EET (UTC+02:00)		Report

18 April 2018 Friendly	Volyn Lutsk (Ukraine)	3–3	(Ukraine) FC Lviv	Lutsk
16:00 EEST (UTC+03:00)	Karpenko 9'Hagh Nazari; 45' (pen.)Zinkevych; 51'	Report	Cadina 5'; Bruno Duarte 20', 90+2'	Stadium: Avanhard Stadium

== Competitions ==
=== Overall ===
Competition	First match	Last match	Starting round	Final position	Record							
Competition	First match	Last match	Starting round	Final position	Pld	W	D	L	GF	GA	GD	Win %
Premier League	22 July 2018	30 May 2019	Matchday 1	6th	32	8	10	14	25	40	−15	25.00
Cup	31 October 2018	7 April 2019	Round of 16 (1/8)	Quarterfinal	2	1	0	1	1	1	+0	50.00
Total					34	9	10	15	26	41	−15	26.47

Last updated: 31 May 2019
Source: Competitions

=== Premier League ===
==== League table ====
Pos	Team	Pld	W	D	L	GF	GA	GD	Pts	Qualification or relegation
2	Dynamo Kyiv	32	22	6	4	54	18	+36	72	Qualification for the Champions League third qualifying round
3	FC Oleksandriya	32	14	7	11	39	34	+5	49	Qualification for the Europa League group stage (Note: Since the winners of the 2018–19 Ukrainian Cup, Shakhtar Donetsk, qualified for European competition based on league position, the spot awarded to the cup winners (Europa League group stage) was passed to the third-placed team, the spot awarded to the third-placed team (Europa League third qualifying round) was passed to the fourth-placed team, and the spot awarded to the fourth-placed team (Europa League second qualifying round) was passed to the fifth-placed team.)
4	FC Mariupol	32	12	7	13	36	47	−11	43 (Note: Head to Head: Mariupol – Zorya +3=0-1, advantage Mariupol.)	Qualification for the Europa League third qualifying round
5	Zorya Luhansk	32	11	10	11	39	34	+5	43	Qualification for the Europa League second qualifying round
6	FC Lviv	32	8	10	14	25	40	−15	34	

Source: Ukrainian Premier League (in Ukrainian), UEFA, Soccerway
Rules for classification: 1) Points; 2) Head-to-head points; 3) Head-to-head goal difference; 4) Head-to-head higher number of goals scored; 5) Goal difference; 6) Higher number of goals scored; 7) Draw or "golden match" if tied for title (Article 22, paragraph 3).
Notes:

Teams that placed 10th and 11th in the 2018–19 Ukrainian Premier League play two-leg play-off with the second and third teams of the 2018–19 Ukrainian First League. The draw for play-offs took place on 24 May 2019 and the games will be played on 4 and 8 June 2019.

Team 1	Agg.	Team 2	1st leg	2nd leg
Chornomorets Odesa	0 – 2	Kolos Kovalivka	0 – 0	0 – 2
Karpaty Lviv	3 – 1	Volyn Lutsk	0 – 0	3 – 1

=== First leg ===
4 June 2019
19:00 UTC+3

Chornomorets Odesa	0 – 0	Kolos Kovalivka
	Report

Chornomorets Stadium, Odesa
Attendance: 5,435
Referee: Anatoliy Abdula (Kharkiv)

4 June 2019
19:00 UTC+3

Karpaty Lviv	0 – 0	Volyn Lutsk
	Report

Ukraina Stadium, Lviv
Attendance: 10,104
Referee: Denys Shurman (Vyshneve)

=== Second leg ===
8 June 2019
17:00 UTC+3

Kolos Kovalivka	2 – 0	Chornomorets Odesa
Havrysh 57', 63' (pen.)	Report

Kolos Stadium, Kovalivka
Attendance: 2,500
Referee: Vitaliy Romanov

Kolos Kovalivka won 2–0 on aggregate and were promoted to the 2019–20 Ukrainian Premier League. Chornomorets Odesa were relegated to the 2019–20 Ukrainian First League

8 June 2019
19:00 UTC+3

Volyn Lutsk	0 – 3 ~~1 – 3~~	Karpaty Lviv
Kozhanov 42'	Report	Klyots 37'; Ponde 82' (pen.); Miroshnichenko 90+5'

Avanhard Stadium, Lutsk
Attendance: 5,200
Referee: Maksym Kozyryatskyi

Karpaty Lviv won 3–0 on aggregate and retained their spot in the 2019–20 Ukrainian Premier League. Volyn Lutsk remained in the 2019–20 Ukrainian First League

Due to fan violence at the game and attack on referee, the original score 1–3 was scratched and replaced with technical score 0–3 loss to Volyn and win for Karpaty. Additionally, the Lutsk department of police started criminal proceedings on the fact of intentional damage to property during the game by the Karpaty fans.

==== Results summary ====
Overall								Home						Away					
Pld	W	D	L	GF	GA	GD	Pts	W	D	L	GF	GA	GD	W	D	L	GF	GA	GD
32	8	10	14	25	40	−15	34	1	6	9	11	24	−13	7	4	5	14	16	−2

Last updated: 31 May 2019.
Source: Competitive matches

==== Results by round ====
Round	1	2	3	4	5	6	7	8	9	10	11	12	13	14	15	16	17	18	19	20	21	22	23	24	25	26	27	28	29	30	31	32
Ground	A	H	A	A	H	A	H	A	H	A	H	H	A	H	H	A	H	A	H	A	H	A	H	H	A	H	A	A	A	H	A	H
Result	W	L	L	D	L	D	D	W	D	D	L	W	W	L	D	D	D	W	L	W	D	W	L	L	L	L	L	L	W	D	L	L
Position	1	5	10	7	10	10	10	7	9	8	9	8	5	8	8	8	8	8	8	8	8	5	6	6	6	6	6	6	6	6	6	6

Updated to match(es) played on 31 May 2019. Source: Competitive matches
A = Away; H = Home; W = Win; D = Draw; L = Loss

==== Matches ====
22 July 2018 1	Arsenal Kyiv	0–2	FC Lviv	Kyiv
19:30 EEST (UTC+03:00)	Jelić Balta (yellow card) 22'; Piris (yellow card) 62'; Dombrovskyi (yellow card) 87'	Report	Voronin 29'; Zapadnya (yellow card) 42', (goal) 50'; Holikov (yellow card) 56'; Pryimak (yellow card) 61'	Stadium: Dynamo Stadium; Attendance: 2,430; Referee: Oleksandr Derdo

28 July 2018 2	FC Lviv	0–1	Dynamo Kyiv	Lviv
19:30 EEST (UTC+03:00)	Augusto (yellow card) 77'	Report	Besyedin (yellow card) 86'; Rusyn 90+2'	Stadium: Arena Lviv; Attendance: 10,150; Referee: Yaroslav Kozyk

4 August 2018 3	Vorskla Poltava	1–0	FC Lviv	Lviv
17:00 EEST (UTC+03:00)	Kolomoyets (yellow card) 71' (yellow-red card) 90+1'; Kadymyan (yellow card) 75'; Careca 83', (yellow card) 90+3'	Report	Holikov (yellow card) 45' (yellow-red card) 90+1'	Stadium: Arena Lviv; Attendance: 2,000; Referee: Ivan Bondar

10 August 2018 4	Olimpik Donetsk	1–1	FC Lviv	Kyiv
19:00 EEST (UTC+03:00)	Hryshko (yellow card) 61'; Zubeyko (yellow card) 77'; Troyanovskyi (yellow card) 81'; Yevhen Pasich 86'	Report	Pryimak (yellow card) 32' (yellow-red card) 39'; Adamyuk 69'	Stadium: Dynamo Stadium; Attendance: 1,000; Referee: Anatoliy Abdula

18 August 2018 5	FC Lviv	0–2	Shakhtar Donetsk	Lviv
17:00 EEST (UTC+03:00)	Kalenchuk (yellow card) 24'	Report	Marlos 21'; Alan Patrick (yellow card) 47'; Bolbat 90'	Stadium: Ukraina Stadium; Attendance: 6,333; Referee: Serhiy Boyko

26 August 2018 6	FC Mariupol	2–2	FC Lviv	Mariupol
19:30 EEST (UTC+03:00)	Pikhalyonok 49'; Fedorchuk (yellow card) 54' (yellow-red card) 90+4'; Yavorskyi (yellow card) 56'; Churko 59'; Fomin (yellow card) 90+3'	Report	Paramonov 45+1'; Bruno Duarte 51'; Lucas Taylor (yellow card) 73'	Stadium: Volodymyr Boiko Stadium; Attendance: 2,400; Referee: Denys Shurman

2 September 2018 7	FC Lviv	2–2	FC Oleksandriya	Lviv
17:00 EEST (UTC+03:00)	Bruno Duarte 8', (yellow card) 9'; Lucas Taylor 21'; Holikov (yellow card) 47'; Kalenchuk (yellow card) 88'	Report	Hrytsuk 54'; Sitalo (yellow card) 75', (goal) 83'	Stadium: Arena Lviv; Attendance: 2,748; Referee: Mykola Kryvonosov

16 September 2018 8	Chornomorets Odesa	0–1	FC Lviv	Odesa
19:30 EEST (UTC+03:00)	Leonov (yellow card) 32'; Chorniy (yellow card) 80'; Tatarkov (yellow card) 81'; Romanyuk (yellow card) 90+3'	Report	Bruno Duarte 43', (yellow card) 84'; Kalenchuk (yellow card) 87'; Bilyi (yellow card) 90'	Stadium: Chornomorets Odesa; Attendance: 6,421; Referee: Volodymyr Novokhatniy

22 September 2018 9	FC Lviv	1–1	Karpaty Lviv	Lviv
17:00 EEST (UTC+03:00)	Bruno Duarte (yellow card) 23', (goal) 79'; Kalenchuk (yellow card) 40'; Lucas Taylor (yellow card) 54'	Report	Fedetskyi (yellow card) 58'; Myakushko 74'; Di Franco (yellow card) 85'; Mehremić (yellow card) 90+4'	Stadium: Arena Lviv; Attendance: 8,723; Referee: Anatoliy Abdula

30 September 2018 10	Zorya Luhansk	0–0	FC Lviv	Zaporizhia
17:00 EEST (UTC+03:00)	Rafael Ratão (yellow card) 71'	Report	Jonatan Lima (yellow card) 47'; Lucas Taylor (yellow card) 48'; Marthã (yellow card) 82'	Stadium: Slavutych-Arena; Attendance: 3,197; Referee: Dmytro Kutakov

7 October 2018 11	FC Lviv	1–3	Desna Chernihiv	Lviv
14:00 EEST (UTC+03:00)	Zapadnya (yellow card) 22'; Bruno Duarte 52'	Report	Artem Favorov 4', 87', (yellow card) 25'; Mostovyi (yellow card) 24'; Filippov 28', (yellow card) 80'; Yermakov (yellow card) 31' (yellow-red card) 45'; Starenkyi (yellow card) 42'; Kartushov (yellow card) 66'; Past (yellow card) 90+4'	Stadium: Arena Lviv; Attendance: 2,131; Referee: Mykola Balakin

21 October 2018 12	FC Lviv	1–0	Arsenal Kyiv	Lviv
14:00 EEST (UTC+03:00)	Bruno Duarte (yellow card) 31' (yellow-red card) 65', (goal) 36'	Report	Sahutkin (yellow card) 58'; Dubinchak (yellow card) 64'; Ngeyitala (yellow card) 67' (yellow-red card) 74'; Vakulko (yellow card) 75'; Sitalo (yellow card) 90'	Stadium: Arena Lviv; Attendance: 1,465; Referee: Kostiantyn Trukhanov

28 October 2018 13	Dynamo Kyiv	0–1	FC Lviv	Kyiv
17:00 EET (UTC+02:00)	Tchê Tchê (yellow card) 66'	Report	Lucas Taylor 21', (yellow card) 58'; Putrash (yellow card) 24'; Sabino (yellow card) 38' (yellow-red card) 90+3'; Pryimak (yellow card) 43'; Paramonov (yellow card) 53'; Jonatan Lima (yellow card) 83'; Marthã (yellow card) 89'; Yanchak (yellow card) 90+2'	Stadium: NSC Olimpiyskiy; Attendance: 9,614; Referee: Maksym Kozyryanskyi

4 November 2018 14	FC Lviv	0–2	Vorskla Poltava	Poltava
17:00 EET (UTC+02:00)	Bruno Duarte (yellow card) 35'; Jonatan Lima (yellow card) 70'; Araujo (yellow card) 89'	Report	Rebenok 19'; Yakubu 39'; Careca (yellow card) 66'; Chesnakov (yellow card) 90+2'	Stadium: Vorskla Stadium; Attendance: 1,400; Referee: Kateryna Monzul

10 November 2018 15	FC Lviv	1–1	Olimpik Donetsk	Lviv
14:00 EET (UTC+02:00)	Marthã (yellow card) 14'; Holikov (yellow card) 24'; Lucas Taylor 27'; Borzenko (yellow card) 43'; Julio Cesar (yellow card) 51'; Sabino (yellow card) 52'	Report	Politylo (yellow card) 39'; Shynder 63'; Kravchenko (yellow card) 76'; Balashov (yellow card) 90+2'	Stadium: Arena Lviv; Attendance: 1,003; Referee: Ievgenii Aranovskyi

23 November 2018 16	Shakhtar Donetsk	0–0	FC Lviv	Kharkiv
19:00 EET (UTC+02:00)	Rakitskiy (yellow card) 44'	Report	Paramonov (yellow card) 8'; Jonatan Lima (yellow card) 16'; Pryimak (yellow card) 46'; Sabino (yellow card) 69'; Bandura (yellow card) 73'	Stadium: OSC Metalist; Attendance: 3,753; Referee: Mykola Balakin

2 December 2018 17	FC Lviv	2–2	FC Mariupol	Lviv
14:00 EET (UTC+02:00)	Bruno Duarte 6'; Voronin 24' (pen.); Pryimak (yellow card) 46'; Araujo (yellow card) 75'	Report	Pikhalyonok 22', (yellow card) 38'; Churko (yellow card) 51'; Boryachuk (yellow card) 71'; Vakula (yellow card) 74', (goal) 80'; Tyschenko (yellow card) 83'	Stadium: Arena Lviv; Attendance: 494; Referee: Yaroslav Kozyk

9 December 2018 18	FC Oleksandriya	1–2	FC Lviv	Oleksandriya
17:00 EET (UTC+02:00)	Bondarenko (yellow card) 51'; Shendrik 84', (yellow card) 85'; Shastal (yellow card) 90+4'	Report	Adamyuk 2', 30'; Voronin (yellow card) 7'; Sabino (yellow card) 55'; Marthã (yellow card) 57'; Borzenko (yellow card) 90+4'; Bandura (yellow card) 90+5'	Stadium: CSC Nika Stadium; Attendance: 1,400; Referee: Maksym Kozyryatskyi

23 February 2019 19	FC Lviv	0–1	Chornomorets Odesa	Lviv
17:00 EET (UTC+02:00)	Lipe Veloso (yellow card) 56'; Adamyuk (yellow card) 57'; Paramonov (yellow card) 59'; Sabino (yellow card) 65'; Pryimak (yellow card) 85'	Report	Babenko (yellow card) 17'; Hoshkoderya 32'; Mischenko (yellow card) 59'; Koval (yellow card) 83'	Stadium: Ukraina Stadium; Attendance: 700; Referee: Volodymyr Novokhatniy

3 March 2019 20	Karpaty Lviv	0–1	FC Lviv	Lviv
17:00 EET (UTC+02:00)	Slyva (yellow card) 24'; Gueye (yellow card) 32'; Di Franco (yellow card) 38'; Myakushko (yellow card) 72'	Report	Mehremić 35' (o.g.); Marthã (yellow card) 38'; Pryimak (yellow card) 44'; Bruno Duarte (yellow card) 90+4'; Bandura (yellow card) 90+9'	Stadium: Ukraina Stadium; Attendance: 12,252; Referee: Yuriy Mozharovskyi

9 March 2019 21	FC Lviv	0–0	Zorya Luhansk	Lviv
19:30 EET (UTC+02:00)	Pedro Vitor (yellow card) 32'; Paramonov (yellow card) 64' (yellow-red card) 80'	Report	Tymchyk (yellow card) 12'; Mykhaylychenko (yellow card) 28'; Hromov (yellow card) 28'; Vernydub (yellow card) 66'; Arveladze (yellow card) 74'; Lytvyn (yellow card) 76'	Stadium: Ukraina Stadium; Attendance: 949; Referee: Yaroslav Kozyk

17 March 2019 22	Desna Chernihiv	0–1	FC Lviv	Chernihiv
17:00 EET (UTC+02:00)	Artem Favorov (yellow card) 28'; Denys Favorov (yellow card) 41'; Mostovyi (yellow card) 85'; Serhiychuk (yellow card) 90'	Report	Marthã (yellow card) 33'; Pedro Vitor 58', (yellow card) 85'	Stadium: Chernihiv Stadium; Attendance: 4,643; Referee: Dmytro Kutakov

3 April 2019 23	FC Lviv	2–3	FC Mariupol	Lviv
19:30 EEST (UTC+03:00)	Alvaro (yellow card) 19'; Lipe Veloso 22'; Marthã (yellow card) 36' (yellow-red card) 53'; Pryimak 80'	Report	Ihnatenko (yellow card) 21'; Zubkov 55' (pen.), 77'; Boryachuk 70'; Halchuk (yellow card) 90'	Stadium: Ukraina Stadium; Attendance: 1,200; Referee: Mykola Balakin

13 April 2019 24	FC Lviv	1–2	FC Oleksandriya	Lviv
19:30 EEST (UTC+03:00)	Bruno Duarte (yellow card) 31', (goal) 72'; Lipe Veloso (yellow card) 37' (yellow-red card) 73'; Pryimak (red card) 90+4'	Report	Polyarus (yellow card) 21', (goal) 49'; Luchkevych 58'; Ponomar (yellow card) 90+4'	Stadium: Ukraina Stadium; Attendance: 949; Referee: Oleksandr Derdro

24 April 2019 25	Zorya Luhansk	2–1	FC Lviv	Zaporizhia
17:00 EEST (UTC+03:00)	Cheberko (yellow card) 16'; Budkivskyi 56'; Kocherhin (yellow card) 77'; Karavayev 90' (pen.); Shevchenko (yellow card) 90+4'	Report	Bruno Duarte 42'; Voronin (yellow card) 49'; Marthã (yellow card) 64'	Stadium: Slavutych-Arena; Attendance: 1,562; Referee: Maksym Kozyryatskyi

28 April 2019 26	FC Lviv	0–1	Dynamo Kyiv	Lviv
19:30 EEST (UTC+03:00)	Marthã (yellow card) 26'; Sabino (yellow card) 48'; Cadina (yellow card) 70'; Pedro Vitor (yellow card) 76'; Pernambuco (yellow card) 90+1'	Report	Rusyn (yellow card) 7'; Burda (red card) 19'; Buyalskyi 24'; Shabanov (yellow card) 51'; Shepelyev (yellow card) 60'; Tsyhankov (yellow card) 73'; Kędziora (red card) 76'; Andriyevskyi (yellow card) 85'	Stadium: Ukraina Stadium; Attendance: 1,480; Referee: Ihor Paskhal

4 May 2019 27	Shakhtar Donetsk	5–0	FC Lviv	Kharkiv
19:30 EEST (UTC+03:00)	Nem (yellow card) 9', (goal) 51'; Alvaro 17' (o.g.); Bolbat 55'; Kovalenko 62'; Alan Patrick 76'	Report	Borzenko (yellow card) 41'	Stadium: OSC Metalist; Attendance: 4,710; Referee: Yaroslav Kozyk

11 May 2019 28	FC Mariupol	2–0	FC Lviv	Mariupol
14:00 EEST (UTC+03:00)	Ihnatenko (yellow card) 4'; Zubkov (yellow card) 50', (goal) 90+2'; Myshnyov (yellow card) 55'; Chobotenko (yellow card) 67'; Pikhalyonok 74'; Bykov (yellow card) 85'	Report	Vicente (yellow card) 39'; Marthã (yellow card) 51'; Bruno Duarte (yellow card) 85'	Stadium: Volodymyr Boiko Stadium; Attendance: 2,389; Referee: Vitaliy Romanov

19 May 2019 29	FC Oleksandriya	0–1	FC Lviv	Oleksandriya
14:00 EEST (UTC+03:00)	Babohlo (yellow card) 36'; Banada (yellow card) 73'	Report	Nasonov (yellow card) 49'; Pedro Vitor 58', (yellow card) 61'; Bruno Duarte (yellow card) 62'; Pernambuco (yellow card) 74'	Stadium: CSC Nika Stadium; Attendance: 1,656; Referee: Denys Shurman

22 May 2019 30	FC Lviv	0–0	Zorya Luhansk	Lviv
17:00 EEST (UTC+03:00)	Pernambuco (yellow card) 28'; Cadina (yellow card) 90'	Report	Arveladze (yellow card) 73' (yellow-red card) 87'	Stadium: Ukraina Stadium; Attendance: 896; Referee: Oleksandr Derdo

26 May 2019 31	Dynamo Kyiv	2–1	FC Lviv	Kyiv
17:00 EEST (UTC+03:00)	Shaparenko (yellow card) 60'; Besyedin 78'; Burda 84'; Sydorchuk (yellow card) 86'	Report	Alvaro 16'; Borzenko (yellow card) 35'; Lipe Veloso (yellow card) 90+2'	Stadium: NSC Olimpiyskiy; Attendance: 11,470; Referee: Yuriy Ivanov

30 May 2019 32	FC Lviv	0–3	Shakhtar Donetsk	Lviv
19:30 EEST (UTC+03:00)	Pedro Vitor (yellow card) 42'; Marthã (yellow card) 61'	Report	Marcos Antônio (yellow card) 51'; Dentinho 65'; Stepanenko (yellow card) 73', (goal) 78'; Matviyenko 85'	Stadium: Ukraina Stadium; Attendance: 2,168; Referee: Maksym Kozyryatskyi

=== Ukrainian Cup ===
31 October 2018 Round of 16 (1/8)	Hirnyk Kryvyi Rih	0–1	FC Lviv	Kryvyi Rih
14:00 EET (UTC+02:00)		Report	Sabino (yellow card) 28'; Araujo 81'; Jonatan Lima (yellow card) 90'	Stadium: Zhovtnevyi Stadium; Attendance: 2,300; Referee: Dmytro Panchyshyn

7 April 2018 Quarterfinal	FC Lviv	0–1	Zorya Luhansk	Lviv
14:00 EET (UTC+02:00)	Borzenko (yellow card) 46'; Alvaro (yellow card) 55'; Lipe Veloso (yellow card) 68'	Report	Lunyov (yellow card) 21'; Lyednyev 48'; Cheberko (yellow card) 63'; Budkivskyi (yellow card) 85'	Stadium: Ukraina Stadium; Referee: Yaroslav Kozyk

== Statistics ==
=== Appearances and goals ===
No.	Pos	Nat	Player	Total		Premier League		Cup	
No.	Pos	Nat	Player	Apps	Goals	Apps	Goals	Apps	Goals
Goalkeepers
23	GK	(Ukraine) UKR	Bohdan Sarnavskyi	10	0	8	0	2	0
31	GK	(Ukraine) UKR	Oleksandr Bandura	24	0	24	0	0	0
Defenders
3	DF	(Ukraine) UKR	Volodymyr Adamyuk	33	3	32	3	1	0
5	DF	(Ukraine) UKR	Vladyslav Pryimak	25	1	17+6	1	2	0
13	DF	(Ukraine) UKR	Oleksandr Nasonov	13	0	9+3	0	0+1	0
20	DF	(Ukraine) UKR	Maksym Brama	1	0	0+1	0	0	0
33	DF	(Ukraine) UKR	Serhiy Borzenko	20	0	17+1	0	2	0
67	DF	(Ukraine) UKR	Vadym Paramonov	26	1	23+2	1	1	0
Midfielders
4	MF	(Brazil) BRA	Cadina	7	0	1+6	0	0	0
6	MF	(Brazil) BRA	Pedro Vitor	14	2	12+1	2	1	0
9	MF	(Brazil) BRA	Bruno Duarte	30	9	28	9	2	0
10	MF	(Brazil) BRA	Lipe Veloso	13	1	11+1	1	1	0
17	MF	(Ukraine) UKR	Maksym Khimchak	1	0	0+1	0	0	0
30	MF	(Brazil) BRA	Jonatan Lima	17	0	11+5	0	0+1	0
32	MF	(Brazil) BRA	Vicente	11	0	6+5	0	0	0
55	MF	(Ukraine) UKR	Dmytro Penteleychuk	2	0	1+1	0	0	0
74	MF	(Brazil) BRA	Marthã	25	0	20+4	0	0+1	0
96	MF	(Brazil) BRA	Rafael Sabino	24	0	17+6	0	1	0
Forwards
7	FW	(Brazil) BRA	Kauê	3	0	1+2	0	0	0
11	FW	(Brazil) BRA	Pernambuco	13	0	8+4	0	1	0
16	FW	(Brazil) BRA	Alvaro	13	1	11+1	1	1	0
22	FW	(Ukraine) UKR	Yuriy Ivanochko	1	0	0+1	0	0	0
97	FW	(Brazil) BRA	China	10	0	3+6	0	0+1	0
Players transferred out during the season
2	DF	(Brazil) BRA	Lucas Taylor	17	3	14+2	3	1	0
6	MF	(Ukraine) UKR	Maksym Kalenchuk	11	0	10+1	0	0	0
7	FW	(Ukraine) UKR	Serhiy Petrov	2	0	1+1	0	0	0
10	FW	(Ukraine) UKR	Serhiy Kyslenko	1	0	0+1	0	0	0
11	FW	(Brazil) BRA	Guilherme Panambi	4	0	1+3	0	0	0
15	DF	(Ukraine) UKR	Vasyl Bilyi	3	0	1+1	0	1	0
17	MF	(Ukraine) UKR	Vadym Yanchak	5	0	0+5	0	0	0
19	MF	(Brazil) BRA	Augusto	12	0	11	0	1	0
20	FW	(Brazil) BRA	Araujo	6	1	2+3	0	0+1	1
22	MF	(Ukraine) UKR	Rostyslav Voloshynovych	5	0	3+2	0	0	0
43	DF	(Ukraine) UKR	Artur Zapadnya	17	1	15+2	1	0	0
44	DF	(Ukraine) UKR	Yuriy Putrash	7	0	5+1	0	1	0
77	DF	(Ukraine) UKR	Serhiy Voronin	16	2	15	2	1	0
91	DF	(Ukraine) UKR	Oleksandr Holikov	17	0	12+4	0	1	0
95	FW	(Brazil) BRA	Julio Cesar	11	0	2+8	0	1	0

Source: Competitions

Last updated: 31 May 2019

=== Goalscorers ===
Rank	No.	Pos	Nat	Name	Premier League	Cup	Total
1	9	MF	(Brazil)	Bruno Duarte	9	0	9
2	2	DF	(Brazil)	Lucas Taylor	3	0	3
2	3	DF	(Ukraine)	Volodymyr Adamyuk	3	0	3
4	6	MF	(Brazil)	Pedro Vitor	2	0	2
4	77	DF	(Ukraine)	Serhiy Voronin	2	0	2
6	5	DF	(Ukraine)	Vladyslav Pryimak	1	0	1
6	10	MF	(Brazil)	Lipe Veloso	1	0	1
6	16	FW	(Brazil)	Alvaro	1	0	1
6	20	FW	(Brazil)	Araujo	0	1	1
6	43	DF	(Ukraine)	Artur Zapadnya	1	0	1
6	67	DF	(Ukraine)	Vadym Paramonov	1	0	1
				Own goal	1	0	1
				Total	25	1	26

Last updated: 31 May 2019

=== Clean sheets ===
Rank	No.	Pos	Nat	Name	Premier League	Cup	Total
1	31	GK	(Ukraine)	Oleksandr Bandura	9	0	9
2	23	GK	(Ukraine)	Bohdan Sarnavskyi	2	1	3
				Total	11	1	12

Last updated: 31 May 2019

=== Disciplinary record ===
No.	Pos	Nat	Player	Premier League			Cup			Total		
No.	Pos	Nat	Player	Booked	(yellow card) (yellow-red card)	Sent off (straight red)	Booked	(yellow card) (yellow-red card)	Sent off (straight red)	Booked	(yellow card) (yellow-red card)	Sent off (straight red)
2	DF	(Brazil)	Lucas Taylor	4	0	0	0	0	0	4	0	0
3	DF	(Ukraine)	Volodymyr Adamyuk	1	0	0	0	0	0	1	0	0
4	MF	(Brazil)	Cadina	2	0	0	0	0	0	2	0	0
5	DF	(Ukraine)	Vladyslav Pryimak	5	1	1	0	0	0	5	1	1
6	MF	(Ukraine)	Maksym Kalenchuk	4	0	0	0	0	0	4	0	0
6	MF	(Brazil)	Pedro Vitor	5	0	0	0	0	0	5	0	0
9	MF	(Brazil)	Bruno Duarte	8	1	0	0	0	0	8	1	0
10	MF	(Brazil)	Lipe Veloso	2	1	0	1	0	0	3	1	0
11	FW	(Brazil)	Pernambuco	3	0	0	0	0	0	3	0	0
13	DF	(Ukraine)	Oleksandr Nasonov	1	0	0	0	0	0	1	0	0
15	DF	(Ukraine)	Vasyl Bilyi	1	0	0	0	0	0	1	0	0
16	FW	(Brazil)	Alvaro	1	0	0	1	0	0	2	0	0
17	MF	(Ukraine)	Vadym Yanchak	1	0	0	0	0	0	1	0	0
19	DF	(Brazil)	Augusto	1	0	0	0	0	0	1	0	0
20	FW	(Brazil)	Araujo	2	0	0	0	0	0	2	0	0
30	MF	(Brazil)	Jonatan Lima	4	0	0	1	0	0	5	0	0
31	GK	(Ukraine)	Oleksandr Bandura	3	0	0	0	0	0	3	0	0
32	MF	(Brazil)	Vicente	1	0	0	0	0	0	1	0	0
33	DF	(Ukraine)	Serhiy Borzenko	4	0	0	1	0	0	5	0	0
43	DF	(Ukraine)	Artur Zapadnya	2	0	0	0	0	0	2	0	0
44	DF	(Ukraine)	Yuriy Putrash	1	0	0	0	0	0	1	0	0
67	DF	(Ukraine)	Vadym Paramonov	3	1	0	0	0	0	3	1	0
74	MF	(Brazil)	Marthã	10	1	0	0	0	0	10	1	0
77	DF	(Ukraine)	Serhiy Voronin	2	0	0	0	0	0	2	0	0
91	DF	(Ukraine)	Oleksandr Holikov	3	1	0	0	0	0	3	1	0
95	FW	(Brazil)	Julio Cesar	1	0	0	0	0	0	1	0	0
96	MF	(Brazil)	Rafael Sabino	5	1	0	1	0	0	6	1	0
			Total	80	7	1	5	0	0	85	7	1

Last updated: 31 May 2019
