= List of Ukrainian football transfers summer 2018 =

This is a list of Ukrainian football transfers summer 2018. Only clubs in 2018–19 Ukrainian Premier League are included.

== Ukrainian Premier League ==
=== Arsenal Kyiv ===
In:

No.	Pos.	Nation	Player
—	DF	(Togo) TOG	Serge Akakpo (free agent)
—	GK	(Ukraine) UKR	Orest Budyuk (from (Ukraine) Cherkaskyi Dnipro)
—	DF	(Argentina) ARG	Oscar Piris (from (Argentina) Mitre)
—	DF	(Ukraine) UKR	Vladyslav Dubinchak (on loan from (Ukraine) Dynamo Kyiv)
—	DF	(Croatia) CRO	Ivan Borna Jelić Balta (from (Croatia) Varaždin)
—	DF	(Ukraine) UKR	Danylo Karas (on loan from (Ukraine) Dynamo Kyiv)
—	DF	(Ukraine) UKR	Oleksiy Larin (from (Bulgaria) Dunav Ruse)
—	DF	(Ukraine) UKR	Oleksandr Melnyk (on loan from (Ukraine) Dynamo Kyiv)
—	DF	(Ukraine) UKR	Oleksandr Nasonov (from (Ukraine) FC Mariupol)
—	DF	(Serbia) SRB	Marko Nikolić (from (Serbia) FK Zemun)
—	DF	(Ukraine) UKR	Danylo Sahutkin (on loan from (Ukraine) Shakhtar Donetsk)
—	MF	(Ukraine) UKR	Volodymyr Doronin (from (Ukraine) Olimpik Donetsk)
—	MF	(North Macedonia) MKD	Stefan Jevtoski (from (Croatia) Varaždin)
—	MF	(Ukraine) UKR	Artem Kozak (from (Greece) PAOK)
—	MF	(Democratic Republic of the Congo) COD	Aurélien Ngeyitala (from (Slovakia) FC Nitra)
—	MF	(Ukraine) UKR	Pavlo Orikhovskyi (on loan from (Ukraine) Dynamo Kyiv)
—	MF	(Ukraine) UKR	Maksym Pryadun (from (Ukraine) Zirka Kropyvnytskyi)
—	MF	(Ukraine) UKR	Yuriy Vakulko (on loan from (Serbia) Partizan)
—	MF	(Ukraine) UKR	Denys Yanakov (on loan from (Ukraine) Dynamo Kyiv)
—	MF	(France) FRA	Curtis Yebli (from (Italy) Bari)
—	FW	(Ukraine) UKR	Leonid Akulinin (from (Ukraine) Karpaty Lviv)
—	FW	(Ukraine) UKR	Vladyslav Alekseyev (on loan from (Ukraine) Dynamo Kyiv)
—	FW	(Ukraine) UKR	Denys Balanyuk (on loan from (Poland) Wisła Kraków)
—	FW	(Italy) ITA	Massimo Goh (on loan from (Italy) Juventus)
—	FW	(Ukraine) UKR	Danyil Sukhoruchko (on loan from (Ukraine) Dynamo Kyiv)

Out:

No.	Pos.	Nation	Player
—	DF	(Ukraine) UKR	Andriy Derkach (to (Belarus) Dnepr Mogilev)
—	DF	(Croatia) CRO	Ivan Borna Jelić Balta
—	DF	(Ukraine) UKR	Dzhemal Kyzylatesh (to (Ukraine) Kolos Kovalivka)
—	DF	(Ukraine) UKR	Navid Nasimi (to (Ukraine) Chaika Petropavlivska Borshchahivka)
—	DF	(Serbia) SRB	Marko Nikolić
—	DF	(Ukraine) UKR	Oleksandr Shevchenko (to (Ukraine) Enerhiya Nova Kakhovka)
—	DF	(Ukraine) UKR	Ivan Trubochkin (to (Ukraine) Chornomorets Odesa)
—	MF	(Ukraine) UKR	Maksym Borovets (to (Ukraine) Veres Rivne)
—	MF	(Ukraine) UKR	Ruslan Chernenko (to (Ukraine) Ahrobiznes Volochysk)
—	MF	(Ukraine) UKR	Valeriy Kucherov (to (Ukraine) FC Kalush)
—	FW	(Ukraine) UKR	Kyrylo Matveyev (to (Ukraine) FC Mariupol)
—	MF	(Ukraine) UKR	Vadym Semchuk (to (Ukraine) Polissya Zhytomyr)
—	MF	(Ukraine) UKR	Artem Starhorodskyi (to (Belarus) FC Vitebsk)
—	FW	(Argentina) ARG	Diego Ezequiel Aguirre (to (Latvia) Spartaks Jūrmala)
—	FW	(Ukraine) UKR	Oleksandr Batalskyi (to (Ukraine) Rukh Vynnyky)
—	FW	(Croatia) CRO	Ivan Rodić

=== Chornomorets Odesa ===
In:

No.	Pos.	Nation	Player
—	GK	(Ukraine) UKR	Serhiy Litovchenko (from (Azerbaijan) Kapaz)
—	GK	(Ukraine) UKR	Bohdan Lobodrov (loan return from (Ukraine) Balkany Zorya)
—	DF	(Ukraine) UKR	Hlib Hrachov (from (Ukraine) Stal Kamianske)
—	DF	(Ukraine) UKR	Oleksandr Kalitov (from (Ukraine) Nyva Vinnytsia)
—	DF	(Ukraine) UKR	Andriy Mischenko (from (Ukraine) Olimpik Donetsk)
—	DF	(Ukraine) UKR	Vladyslav Schetinin (loan return from (Ukraine) Zhemchuzhyna Odesa)
—	DF	(Ukraine) UKR	Oleh Ostapenko (from (Ukraine) Vorskla Poltava)
—	DF	(Ukraine) UKR	Dmytro Ryzhuk (from (Israel) Hapoel Afula)
—	DF	(Ukraine) UKR	Ivan Trubochkin (from (Ukraine) Arsenal Kyiv)
—	MF	(Ukraine) UKR	Ruslan Babenko (from (Ukraine) Zorya Luhansk)
—	MF	(Ukraine) UKR	Oleksiy Chernyshov (loan return from (Ukraine) Zhemchuzhyna Odesa)
—	MF	(Ukraine) UKR	Vladyslav Khomutov (to (Ukraine) Olimpik Donetsk)
—	MF	(Ukraine) UKR	Artur Karnoza (from (Ukraine) SC Dnipro-1)
—	MF	(Ukraine) UKR	Dmytro Leonov (from (Ukraine) Kolos Kovalivka)
—	MF	(Ukraine) UKR	Denys Norenkov (from (Ukraine) Zhemchuzhyna Odesa)
—	MF	(Ukraine) UKR	Mykhaylo Popov (loan return from (Ukraine) Zhemchuzhyna Odesa)
—	MF	(Ukraine) UKR	Oleksiy Savchenko (from (Ukraine) FC Poltava)
—	MF	(Ukraine) UKR	Artem Seleznyov (loan return from (Ukraine) Zhemchuzhyna Odesa)
—	MF	(Ukraine) UKR	Viktor Serdenyuk (loan return from (Ukraine) Zhemchuzhyna Odesa)
—	MF	(Ukraine) UKR	Maksym Voytikhovskyi (from (Ukraine) FC Dnipro)
—	FW	(Ukraine) UKR	Anatoliy Didenko (from (Ukraine) FC Mariupol)
—	FW	(Ukraine) UKR	Oleksiy Khoblenko (loan return from (Poland) Lech Poznań)
—	FW	(Ukraine) UKR	Volodymyr Koval (from (Poland) Olimpia Grudziądz)
—	FW	(Netherlands) NED	Robert Mutzers (free agent)
—	FW	(Ukraine) UKR	Ivan Mykhaylenko (from (Ukraine) FC Dnipro)

Out:

No.	Pos.	Nation	Player
—	GK	(Ukraine) UKR	Bohdan Lobodrov (to (Ukraine) Balkany Zorya)
—	GK	(Ukraine) UKR	Andriy Novak (to (Ukraine) Prykarpattia Ivano-Frankivsk)
—	DF	(Guinea) GUI	Fousseni Bamba (to (Hungary) Honvéd)
—	DF	(Ukraine) UKR	Mykola Ischenko
—	DF	(Ukraine) UKR	Serhiy Lyulka (to (Ukraine) Desna Chernihiv)
—	DF	(Ukraine) UKR	Yevhen Martynenko (to (Ukraine) Vorskla Poltava)
—	DF	(Ukraine) UKR	Vladyslav Schetinin (to (Ukraine) Kremin Kremenchuk)
—	DF	(France) FRA	Mamadou Wagué (to (Iraq) Al-Shorta)
—	DF	(Ukraine) UKR	Yevhen Zubeyko (to (Ukraine) Olimpik Donetsk)
—	DF	(Croatia) CRO	Ivica Žunić (to (Kazakhstan) Atyrau)
—	MF	(Ukraine) UKR	Ivan Bobko
—	MF	(Ukraine) UKR	Oleksiy Chernyshov (to (Ukraine) Balkany Zorya)
—	MF	(Brazil) BRA	Guttiner Tenorio (to (Malta) Hibernians)
—	MF	(Ukraine) UKR	Kyrylo Kovalets (to (Ukraine) FC Oleksandriya)
—	MF	(Ukraine) UKR	Oleksandr Mashnin
—	MF	(Ukraine) UKR	Pavlo Orikhovskyi (loan return to (Ukraine) Dynamo Kyiv)
—	MF	(Ukraine) UKR	Mykhaylo Popov (to (Ukraine) Kremin Kremenchuk)
—	MF	(Ukraine) UKR	Viktor Serdenyuk (to (Ukraine) Kremin Kremenchuk)
—	MF	(Ukraine) UKR	Maksym Tretyakov (to (Slovakia) Dunajská Streda)
—	FW	(Ukraine) UKR	Oleksandr Hladkyy (to (Turkey) Rizespor)
—	FW	(Ukraine) UKR	Oleksiy Khoblenko (to (Belarus) Dynamo Brest)
—	FW	(Ukraine) UKR	Ivan Matyazh (to (Ukraine) Avanhard Kramatorsk)
—	FW	(Brazil) BRA	Sílvio (to (Albania) Vllaznia Shkodër)

=== Desna Chernihiv ===
In:

No.	Pos.	Nation	Player
—	GK	(Ukraine) UKR	Yevhen Past (from (Ukraine) Zirka Kropyvnytskyi)
—	GK	(Ukraine) UKR	Oleh Shevchenko (loan return from (Ukraine) Polissya Zhytomyr)
—	DF	(Ukraine) UKR	Anton Bratkov (from (Ukraine) Zirka Kropyvnytskyi)
—	DF	(Ukraine) UKR	Andriy Hitchenko (from (Ukraine) FC Oleksandriya)
—	DF	(Ukraine) UKR	Maksym Imerekov (from (Cyprus) Ermis Aradippou, free agent)
—	DF	(Ukraine) UKR	Serhiy Lyulka (from (Ukraine) Chornomorets Odesa)
—	DF	(Ukraine) UKR	Pavlo Schedrakov (loan return from (Ukraine) Polissya Zhytomyr)
—	MF	(Ukraine) UKR	Yevheniy Belych (from (Ukraine) FC Desna U-17)
—	MF	(Ukraine) UKR	Vadym Bovtruk (loan return from (Ukraine) Polissya Zhytomyr)
—	MF	(Ukraine) UKR	Ruslan Kisil (from (Ukraine) Olimpik Donetsk)
—	MF	(Ukraine) UKR	Illya Kovalenko (loan return from (Ukraine) PFC Sumy)
—	MF	(Ukraine) UKR	Serhiy Starenkyi (from (Ukraine) FC Oleksandriya)
—	MF	(Ukraine) UKR	Andriy Yakymiv (from (Ukraine) Stal Kamianske)
—	FW	(Ukraine) UKR	Denys Halenkov (loan return from (Ukraine) PFC Sumy)
—	FW	(Ukraine) UKR	Dmytro Khlyobas (from (Ukraine) Dynamo Kyiv)
—	FW	(Ukraine) UKR	Oleksandr Kovpak (from (Ukraine) FC Poltava)
—	FW	(Ukraine) UKR	Oleksandr Sharylo (from (Ukraine) Vorskla Poltava)

Out:

No.	Pos.	Nation	Player
—	GK	(Ukraine) UKR	Kostyantyn Makhnovskyi (on loan to (Ukraine) Olimpik Donetsk)
—	GK	(Ukraine) UKR	Serhii Melashenko (on loan to (Ukraine) FC Mynai)
—	GK	(Ukraine) UKR	Oleh Shevchenko
—	DF	(Georgia (country)) GEO	Giorgi Gadrani (to (Georgia (country)) Dila Gori)
—	DF	(Ukraine) UKR	Oleksandr Holovko
—	DF	(Ukraine) UKR	Pavlo Schedrakov (retired)
—	DF	(Ukraine) UKR	Kyrylo Sydorenko
—	MF	(Ukraine) UKR	Levan Arveladze (to (Ukraine) Zorya Luhansk)
—	MF	(Ukraine) UKR	Vadym Bovtruk (on loan to (Ukraine) PFC Sumy)
—	MF	(Ukraine) UKR	Yevhen Chumak
—	MF	(Ukraine) UKR	Ruslan Kisil (to (Ukraine) Kolos Kovalivka)
—	MF	(Ukraine) UKR	Illya Kovalenko (on loan to (Ukraine) Inhulets Petrove)
—	MF	(Ukraine) UKR	Vadym Melnyk (retired)
—	FW	(Ukraine) UKR	Denys Halenkov (to (Ukraine) Polissya Zhytomyr)

=== Dynamo Kyiv ===
In:

No.	Pos.	Nation	Player
—	GK	(Ukraine) UKR	Denys Boyko (from (Turkey) Beşiktaş)
—	GK	(Ukraine) UKR	Maksym Koval (loan return from (Spain) Deportivo La Coruña)
—	DF	(Portugal) POR	Vitorino Antunes (loan return from (Spain) Getafe)
—	DF	(Ukraine) UKR	Pavlo Lukyanchuk (loan return from (Ukraine) Veres Rivne)
—	DF	(Ukraine) UKR	Zurab Ochigava (loan return from (Ukraine) Olimpik Donetsk)
—	DF	(Brazil) BRA	Sidcley (from (Brazil) Atlético Paranaense)
—	MF	(Ukraine) UKR	Oleksandr Andriyevskyi (loan return from (Ukraine) Zorya Luhansk)
—	MF	(Brazil) BRA	Vitor Bueno (on loan from (Brazil) Santos)
—	MF	(Denmark) DEN	Mikkel Duelund (from (Denmark) Midtjylland)
—	MF	(Ukraine) UKR	Dmytro Kopytov (from (Ukraine) Stal Kamianske)
—	MF	(Ukraine) UKR	Pavlo Orikhovskyi (loan return from (Ukraine) Chornomorets Odesa)
—	MF	(Ukraine) UKR	Serhiy Rybalka (loan return from (Turkey) Sivasspor)
—	MF	(Brazil) BRA	Tchê Tchê (from (Brazil) Palmeiras)
—	FW	(Ukraine) UKR	Artem Khotsyanovskyi (from (Ukraine) Stal Kamianske)
—	FW	(Ukraine) UKR	Vladyslav Supriaha (from (Ukraine) SC Dnipro-1)

Out:

No.	Pos.	Nation	Player
—	GK	(Ukraine) UKR	Denys Boyko (loan return to (Turkey) Beşiktaş)
—	GK	(Ukraine) UKR	Maksym Koval (on loan to (Saudi Arabia) Al-Fateh)
—	DF	(Portugal) POR	Vitorino Antunes (to (Spain) Getafe)
—	DF	(Ukraine) UKR	Vladyslav Dubinchak (on loan to (Ukraine) Arsenal Kyiv)
—	DF	(Ukraine) UKR	Danylo Karas (on loan to (Ukraine) Arsenal Kyiv)
—	DF	(Ukraine) UKR	Yevhen Khacheridi (to (Greece) PAOK)
—	DF	(Ukraine) UKR	Pavlo Lukyanchuk (on loan to (Hungary) Kisvárda)
—	DF	(Ukraine) UKR	Oleksandr Melnyk (on loan to (Ukraine) Arsenal Kyiv)
—	DF	(Peru) PER	Carlos Zambrano (on loan to (Switzerland) Basel)
—	MF	(Paraguay) PAR	Derlis González (on loan to (Brazil) Santos)
—	MF	(Ukraine) UKR	Oleh Husyev (retired)
—	MF	(Ukraine) UKR	Ivan Kaliuzhnyi (on loan to (Ukraine) Metalist 1925 Kharkiv)
—	MF	(Ukraine) UKR	Maksym Kazakov (to (Ukraine) Zorya Luhansk)
—	MF	(Belarus) BLR	Nikita Korzun (on loan to (Belarus) Dinamo Minsk)
—	MF	(Ukraine) UKR	Bohdan Lyednyev (on loan to (Ukraine) Zorya Luhansk)
—	MF	(Ukraine) UKR	Bohdan Mykhaylychenko (on loan to (Ukraine) Zorya Luhansk)
—	MF	(Ukraine) UKR	Pavlo Orikhovskyi (on loan to (Ukraine) Arsenal Kyiv)
—	MF	(Ukraine) UKR	Ruslan Rotan (retired)
—	MF	(Ukraine) UKR	Serhiy Rybalka (to (Turkey) Sivasspor)
—	MF	(Ukraine) UKR	Denys Yanakov (on loan to (Ukraine) Arsenal Kyiv)
—	FW	(Ukraine) UKR	Vladyslav Alekseyev (on loan to (Ukraine) Arsenal Kyiv)
—	FW	(Ukraine) UKR	Dmytro Khlyobas (to (Ukraine) Desna Chernihiv)
—	FW	(Ukraine) UKR	Yuriy Kozyrenko (to (Ukraine) Vorskla Poltava)
—	FW	(Ukraine) UKR	Oleh Lyha (to (Ukraine) Vorskla Poltava)
—	FW	(Brazil) BRA	Júnior Moraes (to (Ukraine) Shakhtar Donetsk)
—	FW	(Democratic Republic of the Congo) COD	Dieumerci Mbokani (to (Belgium) Royal Antwerp)
—	FW	(Ukraine) UKR	Danyil Sukhoruchko (on loan to (Ukraine) Arsenal Kyiv)

=== Karpaty Lviv ===
In:

No.	Pos.	Nation	Player
—	GK	(Ukraine) UKR	Maksym Kuchynskyi (from (Ukraine) FC Poltava)
—	GK	(Ukraine) UKR	Oleh Mozil (loan return from (Ukraine) FC Lviv)
—	GK	(Ukraine) UKR	Mykyta Shevchenko (on loan from (Ukraine) Shakhtar Donetsk)
—	GK	(Ukraine) UKR	Herman Penkov (from (Ukraine) Stal Kamianske)
—	DF	(Ukraine) UKR	Oleh Boroday (from (Ukraine) FC Poltava)
—	DF	(Senegal) SEN	Papa Gueye (free agent)
—	DF	(Ukraine) UKR	Oleksiy Kovtun (from (Belarus) FC Minsk)
—	DF	(Bosnia and Herzegovina) BIH	Adi Mehremić (from (Bosnia and Herzegovina) Željezničar Sarajevo)
—	DF	(Ukraine) UKR	Bohdan Veklyak (from (Ukraine) Skala Stryi)
—	MF	(Colombia) COL	Jorge Carrascal (from (Spain) Sevilla Atlético)
—	MF	(Argentina) ARG	Francisco Di Franco (from (Cyprus) Apollon Limassol)
—	FW	(Brazil) BRA	William De Camargo (on loan from (Spain) CD Leganés B)
—	FW	(Ukraine) UKR	Viktor Khomchenko (loan return from (Ukraine) Rukh Vynnyky)
—	FW	(Uruguay) URU	Kevin Méndez (from (Italy) Roma)
—	FW	(Portugal) POR	Cristian Ponde (from (Portugal) Sporting CP)
—	FW	(Uruguay) URU	Sebastián Ribas (loan return from (Argentina) Patronato)

Out:

No.	Pos.	Nation	Player
—	GK	(Ukraine) UKR	Oleh Mozil (to (Ukraine) Polissya Zhytomyr)
—	GK	(Ukraine) UKR	Roman Mysak (to (Ukraine) Olimpik Donetsk)
—	GK	(Ukraine) UKR	Oleksiy Shevchenko (to (Ukraine) Shakhtar Donetsk)
—	DF	(Ukraine) UKR	Ivan Lobay (to (Ukraine) Rukh Vynnyky)
—	DF	(Georgia (country)) GEO	Nika Sandokhadze (on loan to (Latvia) Rīgas Futbola Skola)
—	DF	(Ukraine) UKR	Nazar Stasyshyn (on loan to (Ukraine) Volyn Lutsk)
—	DF	(Ukraine) UKR	Nazar Vyzdryk (to (Ukraine) Zirka Kropyvnytskyi)
—	DF	(Ukraine) UKR	Yuriy Zavinskyi
—	MF	(Ukraine) UKR	Andriy Busko (on loan to (Ukraine) Rukh Vynnyky)
—	MF	(Colombia) COL	Jorge Carrascal (loan return to (Spain) Sevilla Atlético)
—	MF	(Ukraine) UKR	Ambrosiy Chachua (to (Kazakhstan) Akzhayik)
—	MF	(Argentina) ARG	Francisco Di Franco (loan return to (Cyprus) Apollon Limassol)
—	MF	(Ukraine) UKR	Roman Lebed
—	FW	(Ukraine) UKR	Leonid Akulinin (to (Ukraine) Arsenal Kyiv)
—	FW	(Colombia) COL	Maurício Cortés (loan return to (Colombia) Independiente Medellín)
—	FW	(Ukraine) UKR	Ihor Karpenko (on loan to (Ukraine) Volyn Lutsk)
—	FW	(Ukraine) UKR	Viktor Khomchenko (to (Ukraine) Avanhard Kramatorsk)
—	FW	(Ukraine) UKR	Taras Petskiv (to (Ukraine) Veres Rivne)
—	FW	(Ukraine) UKR	Andriy Remenyuk (on loan to (Ukraine) Rukh Vynnyky)
—	FW	(Uruguay) URU	Sebastián Ribas (to (Argentina) Lanús)
—	FW	(Ukraine) UKR	Maksym Salamakha (to (Ukraine) Veres Rivne)
—	FW	(Ukraine) UKR	Volodymyr Voytovych (on loan to (Ukraine) Rukh Vynnyky)
—	FW	(Ukraine) UKR	Dmytro Zayikyn (to (Ukraine) Veres Rivne)

=== Lviv ===
In:

No.	Pos.	Nation	Player
—	GK	(Ukraine) UKR	Oleksandr Bandura (from (Ukraine) Veres Rivne)
—	GK	(Ukraine) UKR	Bohdan Druz (from (Ukraine) UFC Olimpik Kharkiv)
—	GK	(Ukraine) UKR	Bohdan Sarnavskyi (from (Ukraine) Veres Rivne)
—	DF	(Ukraine) UKR	Volodymyr Adamyuk (from (Ukraine) Veres Rivne)
—	DF	(Ukraine) UKR	Vasyl Bilyi (from (Ukraine) Rukh Vynnyky)
—	DF	(Ukraine) UKR	Serhiy Borzenko (from (Ukraine) Veres Rivne)
—	DF	(Ukraine) UKR	Hlib Bukhal (loan return from (Ukraine) FC Oleksandriya)
—	DF	(Ukraine) UKR	Semen Datsenko (free agent)
—	DF	(Ukraine) UKR	Volodymyr Domnitsak (from (Ukraine) Veres Rivne)
—	DF	(Ukraine) UKR	Oleksandr Holikov (from (Ukraine) FC Poltava)
—	DF	(Ukraine) UKR	Vadym Paramonov (from (Ukraine) FC Poltava)
—	DF	(Ukraine) UKR	Vladyslav Pryimak (from (Ukraine) Veres Rivne)
—	DF	(Ukraine) UKR	Yuriy Putrash (free agent)
—	DF	(Ukraine) UKR	Serhiy Siminin (from (Ukraine) Veres Rivne)
—	DF	(Brazil) BRA	Lucas Taylor (on loan from (Brazil) Palmeiras)
—	DF	(Ukraine) UKR	Serhiy Voronin (from (Ukraine) PFC Sumy)
—	DF	(Ukraine) UKR	Artur Zapadnya (from (Ukraine) Veres Rivne)
—	MF	(Brazil) BRA	Augusto (free agent)
—	MF	(Ukraine) UKR	Yuriy Ivanochko (from (Ukraine) Veres Rivne)
—	MF	(Brazil) BRA	Jonatan Lima (from (Brazil) Novorizontino)
—	MF	(Ukraine) UKR	Maksym Kalenchuk (from (Ukraine) Veres Rivne)
—	MF	(Brazil) BRA	Marthã (free agent)
—	MF	(Ukraine) UKR	Ivan Pavliukh (from (Ukraine) Veres Rivne)
—	MF	(Brazil) BRA	Rafael Sabino (from (Brazil) Jaguariúna)
—	MF	(Ukraine) UKR	Rostyslav Voloshynovych (from (Ukraine) Veres Rivne)
—	FW	(Brazil) BRA	Bruno Duarte (from (Brazil) Portuguesa)
—	FW	(Brazil) BRA	Araujo (??)
—	FW	(Brazil) BRA	Julio Cesar (from (Ukraine) Veres Rivne)
—	FW	(Brazil) BRA	Panambi (free agent)
—	FW	(Ukraine) UKR	Serhiy Petrov (from (Ukraine) Zirka Kropyvnytskyi)
—	FW	(Ukraine) UKR	Vitaliy Mykytyn (from (Ukraine) Veres Rivne)
—	FW	(Ukraine) UKR	Ruslan Stepanyuk (from (Ukraine) Veres Rivne)

Out:

No.	Pos.	Nation	Player
—	GK	(Ukraine) UKR	Roman Herych (to (Ukraine) FC Kalush)
—	GK	(Ukraine) UKR	Oleh Mozil (loan return to (Ukraine) Karpaty Lviv)
—	DF	(Ukraine) UKR	Hlib Bukhal (to (Ukraine) FC Oleksandriya)
—	DF	(Ukraine) UKR	Oleksandr Hrynyshyn
—	DF	(Ukraine) UKR	Anatoliy Kuchynskyi
—	DF	(Ukraine) UKR	Oleh Matushevskyi (to (Ukraine) FC Kalush)
—	DF	(Ukraine) UKR	Oleksandr Romanchuk (to (Ukraine) Dynamo Kyiv)
—	DF	(Ukraine) UKR	Serhiy Siminin (to (Ukraine) Volyn Lutsk)
—	MF	(Ukraine) UKR	Roman Bahday
—	MF	(Ukraine) UKR	Maksym Kalenchuk
—	MF	(Ukraine) UKR	Taras Koblyuk
—	MF	(Ukraine) UKR	Oleh Panasyuk
—	MF	(Ukraine) UKR	Ihor Poruchynskyi (to (Ukraine) Polissya Zhytomyr)
—	MF	(Ukraine) UKR	Oleh Mizernyk (to (Ukraine) Nyva Ternopil)
—	MF	(Ukraine) UKR	Volodymyr Savoshko (to (Ukraine) Nyva-V Vinnytsia)
—	MF	(Ukraine) UKR	Yuriy Shpyrka (to (Ukraine) Dynamo Kyiv)
—	MF	(Ukraine) UKR	Mykhaylo Zaychuk
—	FW	(Ukraine) UKR	Serhiy Kyslenko
—	FW	(Ukraine) UKR	Yaroslav Matviyev (to (Ukraine) FC Kalush)
—	FW	(Ukraine) UKR	Oleksiy Omel'chenko
—	FW	(Brazil) BRA	Panambi
—	FW	(Ukraine) UKR	Ruslan Stepanyuk (to (Kazakhstan) Zhetysu)
—	FW	(Ukraine) UKR	Taras Zaviyskyi (to (Germany) Buchonia Flieden)

=== Mariupol ===
In:

No.	Pos.	Nation	Player
—	GK	(Ukraine) UKR	Yevhen Hrytsenko (on loan from (Ukraine) Shakhtar Donetsk)
—	DF	(Ukraine) UKR	Serhiy Chobotenko (on loan from (Ukraine) Shakhtar Donetsk)
—	MF	(Ukraine) UKR	Ihor Bykovskyi (free agent)
—	MF	(Ukraine) UKR	Valeriy Fedorchuk (from (Latvia) Riga)
—	MF	(Ukraine) UKR	Kyrylo Matveyev (from (Ukraine) Arsenal Kyiv)
—	MF	(Ukraine) UKR	Pavlo Polehenko (from (Ukraine) Zirka Kropyvnytskyi)
—	MF	(Ukraine) UKR	Oleksandr Zubkov (on loan from (Ukraine) Shakhtar Donetsk)
—	FW	(Ukraine) UKR	Ruslan Fomin (from (Ukraine) Shakhtar Donetsk)
—	FW	(Ukraine) UKR	Vladyslav Vakula (from (Ukraine) Stal Kamianske)

Out:

No.	Pos.	Nation	Player
—	GK	(Ukraine) UKR	Ihor Levchenko (to (Finland) IFK Mariehamn)
—	DF	(Ukraine) UKR	Oleksandr Nasonov (to (Ukraine) Arsenal Kyiv)
—	DF	(Ukraine) UKR	Yevhen Neplyakh (to (Ukraine) Volyn Lutsk)
—	MF	(Ukraine) UKR	Serhiy Bolbat (loan return to (Ukraine) Shakhtar Donetsk)
—	MF	(Ukraine) UKR	Denys Dedechko (to (Russia) SKA-Khabarovsk)
—	MF	(Senegal) SEN	Roger Gomis
—	MF	(Ukraine) UKR	Andriy Totovytskyi (loan return to (Ukraine) Shakhtar Donetsk)
—	FW	(Ukraine) UKR	Denys Arendaruk (loan return to (Ukraine) Shakhtar Donetsk)
—	FW	(Ukraine) UKR	Anatoliy Didenko (to (Ukraine) Chornomorets Odesa)

=== Oleksandriya ===
In:

No.	Pos.	Nation	Player
—	DF	(Ukraine) UKR	Hlib Bukhal (from (Ukraine) FC Lviv)
—	DF	(Ukraine) UKR	Stanislav Mykytsey
—	DF	(Ukraine) UKR	Dmytro Semenov (from (Ukraine) FC Dnipro)
—	MF	(Ukraine) UKR	Kyrylo Dryshlyuk (from (Ukraine) Zirka Kropyvnytskyi)
—	MF	(Ukraine) UKR	Dmytro Hrechyshkin (from (Ukraine) Shakhtar Donetsk)
—	MF	(Ukraine) UKR	Kyrylo Kostenko (from (Ukraine) Stal Kamianske)
—	MF	(Ukraine) UKR	Kyrylo Kovalets (from (Ukraine) Chornomorets Odesa)
—	MF	(Ukraine) UKR	Maksym Zaderaka (from (Ukraine) Stal Kamianske)
—	FW	(Brazil) BRA	Victor César

Out:

No.	Pos.	Nation	Player
—	DF	(Ukraine) UKR	Andriy Batsula (to (Belgium) Kortrijk)
—	DF	(Ukraine) UKR	Hlib Bukhal (loan return to (Ukraine) FC Lviv)
—	DF	(Ukraine) UKR	Serhiy Chebotayev (to (Ukraine) SC Dnipro-1)
—	DF	(Ukraine) UKR	Andriy Hitchenko (to (Ukraine) Desna Chernihiv)
—	MF	(Ukraine) UKR	Vitaliy Koltsov (to (Ukraine) Olimpik Donetsk)
—	MF	(Ukraine) UKR	Serhiy Starenkyi (to (Ukraine) Desna Chernihiv)
—	MF	(Ukraine) UKR	Oleksiy Zinkevych (loan return to (Ukraine) Shakhtar Donetsk)

=== Olimpik Donetsk ===
In:

No.	Pos.	Nation	Player
—	GK	(Ukraine) UKR	Yaroslav Kotlyarov (loan return from (Ukraine) Sudnobudivnyk Mykolaiv)
—	GK	(Ukraine) UKR	Volodymyr Krynskyi (from (Ukraine) FC Poltava)
—	GK	(Ukraine) UKR	Kostyantyn Makhnovskyi (on loan from (Ukraine) Desna Chernihiv)
—	GK	(Ukraine) UKR	Roman Mysak (from (Ukraine) Karpaty Lviv)
—	DF	(Ukraine) UKR	Dmytro Hryshko (from (Russia) SKA-Khabarovsk)
—	DF	(Ukraine) UKR	Anton Kravchenko (from (Turkey) Karabükspor)
—	DF	(Ukraine) UKR	Serhiy Melinyshyn (from (Ukraine) Volyn Lutsk)
—	DF	(Ukraine) UKR	Yevhen Zubeyko (from (Ukraine) Chornomorets Odesa)
—	MF	(Ukraine) UKR	Vladyslav Apostoliuk (loan return from (Denmark) Fremad Amager)
—	MF	(Ukraine) UKR	Dmytro Bilonoh (on loan from (Ukraine) Zirka Kropyvnytskyi)
—	MF	(France) FRA	Maxime Do Couto (from (France) Avoine OCC)
—	MF	(Nigeria) NGA	David Enogela (from (Nigeria) Young Stars)
—	MF	(Ukraine) UKR	Oleksiy Gai (free agent)
—	MF	(Ukraine) UKR	Vitaliy Koltsov (from (Ukraine) FC Oleksandriya)
—	MF	(Ukraine) UKR	Pavlo Ksyonz (from (Poland) Sandecja Nowy Sącz)
—	MF	(Ukraine) UKR	Yevhen Morozenko (from (Ukraine) Veres Rivne)
—	MF	(Ukraine) UKR	Serhiy Politylo (from (Turkey) Adana Demirspor, free agent)
—	MF	(Ukraine) UKR	Stanislav Sharay (loan return from (Ukraine) Avanhard Kramatorsk)
—	MF	(Ukraine) UKR	Vladyslav Sharay (loan return from (Ukraine) Avanhard Kramatorsk)
—	MF	(Ukraine) UKR	Yevhen Troyanovskyi (from (Ukraine) FC Poltava)
—	FW	(Ukraine) UKR	Maksym Dehtyarev (from (Ukraine) FC Poltava)
—	FW	(Ukraine) UKR	Anton Shynder (from (Hungary) Kisvárda)
—	FW	(Ukraine) UKR	Artur Zahorulko (from (Ukraine) Shakhtar Donetsk)

Out:

No.	Pos.	Nation	Player
—	GK	(Ukraine) UKR	Yaroslav Kotlyarov (to (Ukraine) Kremin Kremenchuk)
—	GK	(Ukraine) UKR	Artem Kychak (to (Hungary) MTK Budapest)
—	GK	(Georgia (country)) GEO	Zauri Makharadze (to (Ukraine) Zorya Luhansk)
—	GK	(Ukraine) UKR	Roman Mysak (to (Denmark) AGF Aarhus)
—	DF	(Republic of the Congo) CGO	Vladis-Emmerson Illoy-Ayyet (to (Denmark) Vejle)
—	DF	(Ukraine) UKR	Artem Kozlov (on loan to (Ukraine) PFC Sumy)
—	DF	(Ukraine) UKR	Serhiy Kulynych (to (Serbia) Spartak Subotica)
—	DF	(Ukraine) UKR	Andriy Mischenko (to (Ukraine) Chornomorets Odesa)
—	DF	(Georgia (country)) GEO	Luka Nadiradze (to (Ukraine) PFC Sumy)
—	DF	(Ukraine) UKR	Zurab Ochigava (loan return to (Ukraine) Dynamo Kyiv)
—	DF	(Ukraine) UKR	Vadym Schastlyvtsev (to (Ukraine) Avanhard Kramatorsk)
—	DF	(Ukraine) UKR	Nazar Yedynak (to (Poland) Ruch Wysokie Mazowieckie)
—	MF	(Ukraine) UKR	Vladyslav Apostoliuk (on loan to (Denmark) Fremad Amager)
—	MF	(Brazil) BRA	Leônidas
—	MF	(Ukraine) UKR	Ivan Brikner (to (Ukraine) Rukh Vynnyky)
—	MF	(Ukraine) UKR	Volodymyr Doronin (to (Ukraine) Arsenal Kyiv)
—	MF	(Ukraine) UKR	Ruslan Kisil (to (Ukraine) Desna Chernihiv)
—	MF	(Ukraine) UKR	Vladyslav Khomutov (to (Ukraine) Chornomorets Odesa)
—	MF	(Ukraine) UKR	Yevhen Morozenko
—	MF	(Ukraine) UKR	Artem Schedryi (to (Ukraine) Dnipro-1)
—	MF	(Ukraine) UKR	Stanislav Sharay (on loan to (Ukraine) PFC Sumy)
—	MF	(Ukraine) UKR	Vladyslav Sharay (on loan to (Ukraine) PFC Sumy)
—	MF	(Croatia) CRO	Josip Vuković (to (Portugal) Marítimo)
—	FW	(Ukraine) UKR	Vladyslav Helzin
—	FW	(Ukraine) UKR	Stanislav Bilenkyi (to (Slovakia) Dunajská Streda)
—	FW	(Ukraine) UKR	Yuriy Zakharkiv (to (Lithuania) Atlantas Klaipėda)
—	FW	(Ukraine) UKR	Artur Zahorulko (to (Ukraine) Rukh Vynnyky)

=== Shakhtar Donetsk ===
In:

No.	Pos.	Nation	Player
—	GK	(Ukraine) UKR	Oleksiy Shevchenko (from (Ukraine) Karpaty Lviv)
—	DF	(Brazil) BRA	Márcio Azevedo (loan return from (Greece) PAOK)
—	DF	(Ukraine) UKR	Oleksandr Masalov (loan return from (Ukraine) Kolos Kovalivka)
—	DF	(Ukraine) UKR	Eduard Sobol (loan return from (Czech Republic) Slavia Prague)
—	MF	(Ukraine) UKR	Serhiy Bolbat (loan return from (Ukraine) FC Mariupol)
—	MF	(Ukraine) UKR	Oleh Danchenko (loan return from (Russia) Anzhi Makhachkala)
—	MF	(Brazil) BRA	Maycon (from (Brazil) Corinthians)
—	MF	(Ukraine) UKR	Andriy Totovytskyi (loan return from (Ukraine) FC Mariupol)
—	MF	(Ukraine) UKR	Oleksiy Zinkevych (loan return from (Ukraine) FC Oleksandriya)
—	FW	(Ukraine) UKR	Denys Arendaruk (loan return from (Ukraine) FC Mariupol)
—	FW	(Ukraine) UKR	Pylyp Budkivskyi (loan return from (Russia) Anzhi Makhachkala)
—	FW	(Brazil) BRA	Fernando (from (Brazil) Palmeiras)
—	FW	(Nigeria) NGA	Olarenwaju Kayode (from (England) Manchester City)
—	FW	(Ukraine) UKR	Vladyslav Kulach (loan return to (Ukraine) Vorskla Poltava)
—	FW	(Brazil) BRA	Marquinhos Cipriano (from (Brazil) São Paulo)
—	FW	(Brazil) BRA	Júnior Moraes (from (Ukraine) Dynamo Kyiv)

Out:

No.	Pos.	Nation	Player
—	GK	(Ukraine) UKR	Yevhen Hrytsenko (on loan to (Ukraine) FC Mariupol)
—	GK	(Ukraine) UKR	Mykyta Shevchenko (on loan to (Ukraine) Karpaty Lviv)
—	DF	(Brazil) BRA	Márcio Azevedo (to (Brazil) Atlético Paranaense)
—	DF	(Ukraine) UKR	Serhiy Chobotenko (on loan to (Ukraine) FC Mariupol)
—	DF	(Brazil) BRA	Dodô (on loan to (Portugal) Vitória Guimarães)
—	DF	(Ukraine) UKR	Danylo Sahutkin (on loan to (Ukraine) Arsenal Kyiv)
—	DF	(Ukraine) UKR	Yuriy Senytskyi (on loan to (Ukraine) Avanhard Kramatorsk)
—	DF	(Ukraine) UKR	Dmytro Shevchenko (on loan to (Ukraine) Rukh Vynnyky)
—	DF	(Ukraine) UKR	Eduard Sobol (on loan to (Czech Republic) Jablonec)
—	DF	(Croatia) CRO	Darijo Srna (to (Italy) Cagliari)
—	MF	(Georgia (country)) GEO	Giorgi Arabidze (to (Portugal) C.D. Nacional)
—	MF	(Brazil) BRA	Bernard (to (England) Everton)
—	MF	(Brazil) BRA	Fred (to (England) Manchester United)
—	MF	(Ukraine) UKR	Dmytro Hrechyshkin (to (Ukraine) FC Oleksandriya)
—	MF	(Azerbaijan) AZE	Murad Khachayev (on loan to (Azerbaijan) Sumgayit)
—	MF	(Ukraine) UKR	Ivan Petryak (on loan to (Hungary) Ferencváros)
—	MF	(Ukraine) UKR	Oleksiy Zinkevych (to (Ukraine) Volyn Lutsk)
—	MF	(Ukraine) UKR	Oleksandr Zubkov (on loan to (Ukraine) FC Mariupol)
—	FW	(Ukraine) UKR	Denys Arendaruk (on loan to (Ukraine) Rukh Vynnyky)
—	FW	(Argentina) ARG	Gustavo Blanco Leschuk (on loan to (Spain) Málaga)
—	FW	(Ukraine) UKR	Pylyp Budkivskyi (on loan to (France) Sochaux)
—	FW	(Argentina) ARG	Facundo Ferreyra (to (Portugal) Benfica)
—	FW	(Ukraine) UKR	Ruslan Fomin (to (Ukraine) FC Mariupol)
—	FW	(Nigeria) NGA	Olarenwaju Kayode (loan return to (England) Manchester City)
—	FW	(Ukraine) UKR	Artur Zahorulko (to (Ukraine) Olimpik Donetsk)

=== Vorskla Poltava ===
In:

No.	Pos.	Nation	Player
—	DF	(Brazil) BRA	Artur (from (Brazil) Internacional)
—	DF	(Mali) MLI	Ibrahiim Kane (from (Mali) Duguwolofila)
—	DF	(Ukraine) UKR	Yevhen Martynenko (from (Ukraine) Chornomorets Odesa)
—	DF	(Ukraine) UKR	Denys Taraduda (from (Ukraine) FC Dnipro)
—	DF	(Ghana) GHA	Najeeb Yakubu (from (Nigeria) Niger Tornadoes)
—	MF	(Ukraine) UKR	Artem Chelyadin (from (Ukraine) Skala Stryi)
—	MF	(Ukraine) UKR	Artem Habelok (free agent)
—	MF	(Ukraine) UKR	Maryan Mysyk (from (Ukraine) Stal Kamianske)
—	FW	(Brazil) BRA	Nicolas Careca (on loan from (Brazil) Grêmio)
—	FW	(Ukraine) UKR	Yuriy Kozyrenko (from (Ukraine) Dynamo Kyiv)
—	FW	(Ukraine) UKR	Oleh Lyha (from (Ukraine) Dynamo Kyiv)

Out:

No.	Pos.	Nation	Player
—	GK	(Ukraine) UKR	Danylo Kanevtsev (on loan to (Ukraine) Metalist 1925 Kharkiv)
—	GK	(Ukraine) UKR	Yan Vichnyi
—	DF	(Ukraine) UKR	Ihor Honchar (on loan to (Ukraine) Hirnyk-Sport Horishni Plavni)
—	DF	(Ukraine) UKR	Oleksiy Lutsenko
—	DF	(Ukraine) UKR	Oleh Ostapenko (to (Ukraine) Chornomorets Odesa)
—	MF	(Ukraine) UKR	Yuriy Hluschuk
—	MF	(Ukraine) UKR	Serhiy Kosovskyi (to (Ukraine) Obolon-Brovar Kyiv)
—	FW	(Ukraine) UKR	Oleksandr Sharylo (to (Ukraine) Desna Chernihiv)

=== Zorya Luhansk ===
In:

No.	Pos.	Nation	Player
—	GK	(Georgia (country)) GEO	Zauri Makharadze (from (Ukraine) Olimpik Donetsk)
—	DF	(Ukraine) UKR	Vitaliy Vernydub (from (Azerbaijan) Gabala)
—	MF	(Ukraine) UKR	Levan Arveladze (from (Ukraine) Desna Chernihiv)
—	MF	(Ukraine) UKR	Mykyta Kamenyuka (loan return from (Ukraine) Veres Rivne)
—	MF	(Ukraine) UKR	Maksym Kazakov (from (Ukraine) Dynamo Kyiv)
—	MF	(Ukraine) UKR	Dmytro Khomchenovskyi (from (Russia) Ural Yekaterinburg)
—	MF	(Ukraine) UKR	Bohdan Lyednyev (on loan from (Ukraine) Dynamo Kyiv)
—	MF	(Ukraine) UKR	Bohdan Mykhaylychenko (on loan from (Ukraine) Dynamo Kyiv)
—	FW	(Colombia) COL	Leonardo Acevedo (on loan from (Portugal) Sporting CP)
—	FW	(Brazil) BRA	Rafael Ratão (from (Brazil) Oeste)

Out:

No.	Pos.	Nation	Player
—	GK	(Ukraine) UKR	Andriy Lunin (to (Spain) Real Madrid)
—	DF	(Morocco) MAR	Mohamed El Bouazzati
—	DF	(Ukraine) UKR	Yevhen Opanasenko (to (Turkey) Konyaspor)
—	MF	(Ukraine) UKR	Oleksandr Andriyevskyi (loan return to (Ukraine) Dynamo Kyiv)
—	MF	(Ukraine) UKR	Ruslan Babenko (to (Ukraine) Chornomorets Odesa)
—	MF	(Serbia) SRB	Željko Ljubenović (retired)
—	MF	(Cameroon) CMR	Gaël Ondoua (to (Russia) Anzhi Makhachkala)
—	FW	(France) FRA	David Faupala (to (Cyprus) Apollon Limassol)
—	FW	(Brazil) BRA	Iury (to (United Arab Emirates) Al-Nasr Dubai SC)
