= Mozil =

Mozil is a surname. Notable people with the surname include:

- Czesław Mozil (born 1979), Polish musician
- Oleh Mozil (born 1996), Ukrainian footballer
