= Bruno Duarte =

Brazilian footballer (born 1996)

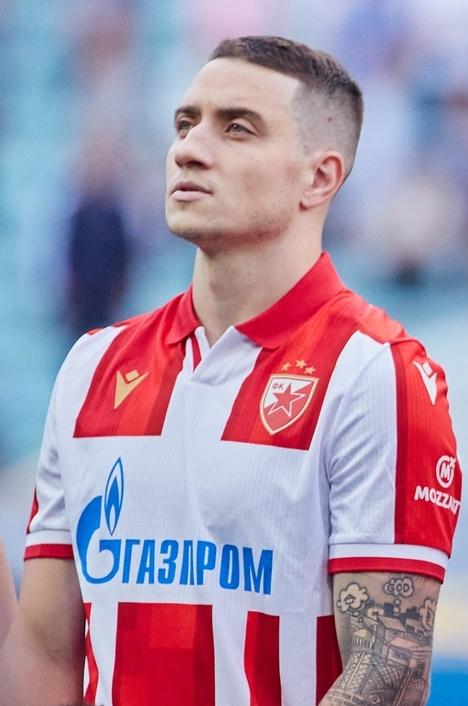
- Duarte in 2025 with Red Star Belgrade

Personal information
- Full name: Bruno Duarte da Silva
- Date of birth: 24 March 1996 (age 30)
- Place of birth: São Paulo, Brazil
- Height: 1.82 m (6 ft 0 in)
- Position: Forward

Team information
- Current team: Vasco da Gama
- Number: 19

Youth career
- 2012–2013: São Paulo
- 2013–2016: Palmeiras
- 2016: Portuguesa

Senior career*
Years	Team	Apps	(Gls)
2016–2018	Portuguesa	20	(2)
2018–2019	Lviv	31	(10)
2019–2022	Vitória Guimarães	80	(18)
2022–2023	Damac	18	(4)
2023–2024	Farense	32	(13)
2024–2026	Red Star Belgrade	61	(27)
2026–	Vasco da Gama	9	(4)
- * Club domestic league appearances and goals as of 20 September 2026

Bruno Duarte da Silva (born 24 March 1996) is a Brazilian professional footballer who plays as a forward for Campeonato Brasileiro Série A club Vasco da Gama.

== Club career ==
=== Portuguesa ===
Born in São Paulo, São Paulo, Bruno Duarte started at local São Paulo FC. In March 2016, after a stint at Palmeiras, he joined Portuguesa and was assigned to the under-20 squad.

Bruno Duarte made his senior debut on 4 June 2016, starting in a 3–1 Série C home win against Ypiranga-RS. He featured in six matches during the campaign, as his side suffered relegation.

Bruno Duarte scored his first senior goal on 9 April 2017, netting the opener in a 1–1 away draw against Guarani for the Campeonato Paulista Série A2. The following March, he asked to leave the club.

=== Lviv ===
In July 2018, Bruno Duarte signed a three-year contract with FC Lviv in the Ukrainian Premier League. He made his debut abroad on 22 July, in the away game of the first round against FC Arsenal Kyiv. On 22 September, he equalised in a 1–1 home draw with FC Karpaty Lviv in the West Ukrainian football derby.

=== Vitória de Guimarães ===
On 15 August 2019, Bruno Duarte signed a four-year deal with the option of a fifth at Vitória S.C. in the Portuguese Primeira Liga. The transfer fee was €600,000 for 75% of his economic rights. He made his debut a week later, starting in a goalless draw away to FCSB in the UEFA Europa League play-offs. On 22 September, he scored his first goal in a 3–1 win at C.D. Tondela, and also netted in both Europa group games against Arsenal, including a late equaliser on 6 November at the Estádio D. Afonso Henriques.

In 2020–21, Bruno Duarte was more often a substitute behind Colombian Óscar Estupiñán, while new manager Pepa experimented with them in tandem the following season. In the Taça da Liga, he scored in three games as Vitória reached the semi-finals at the expense of S.L. Benfica; this included a late equaliser at home to that team on 27 October.

=== Damac ===
On 22 July 2022, Bruno Duarte joined Saudi Arabian club Damac. The transfer fee was reported to be worth an initial €600,000, which could rise to €700,000 with add-ons.

=== Farense ===
On 21 July 2023, Bruno Duarte returned to Portugal, signing a two-year contract with recently promoted to Primeira Liga side Farense.

== Career statistics ==
As of match played 11 August 2026

Appearances and goals by club, season and competition
Club	Season	League			State league (Note: Includes Campeonato Paulista Série A2)		National cup (Note: Includes Ukrainian Cup, Taça de Portugal, King's Cup, Serbian Cup)		League cup (Note: Includes Taça da Liga)		Continental		Other		Total	
Club	Season	Division	Apps	Goals	Apps	Goals	Apps	Goals	Apps	Goals	Apps	Goals	Apps	Goals	Apps	Goals
Portuguesa	2016	Série C	6	0	0	0	0	0	–		–		–		6	0
Portuguesa	2017	Série D	6	1	4	1	0	0	–		–		11 (Note: Appearances in Copa Paulista)	1	21	3
Portuguesa	2018	Paulista A2	–		4	0	–		–		–		0	0	4	0
Portuguesa	Total		12	8	1	0	0	0	–		–		11	1	31	3
Lviv	2018–19	Ukrainian Premier League	28	9	–		2	0	–		–		–		30	9
Lviv	2019–20	Ukrainian Premier League	3	1	–		0	0	–		–		–		3	1
Lviv	Total		31	10	–		2	0	–		–		–		33	10
Vitória Guimarães	2019–20	Primeira Liga	24	8	–		1	0	1	0	8 (Note: Appearances in UEFA Europa League)	2	–		34	10
Vitória Guimarães	2020–21	Primeira Liga	25	3	–		2	0	0	0	–		–		27	3
Vitória Guimarães	2021–22	Primeira Liga	31	7	–		2	0	4	3	–		–		37	10
Vitória Guimarães	Total		80	18	–		5	0	5	3	8	2	–		98	23
Damac	2022–23	Saudi Pro League	18	4	–		1	0	–		–		–		19	4
Farense	2023–24	Primeira Liga	32	13	–		1	1	3	0	–		–		36	14
Red Star Belgrade	2024–25	Serbian SuperLiga	32	16	—		4	3	–		9 (Note: Appearances in UEFA Champions League)	1	—		45	20
Red Star Belgrade	2025–26	Serbian SuperLiga	27	10	—		5	3	–		16 (Note: Six appearances and four goals in UEFA Champions League, ten appearances and two goals in UEFA Europa League)	6	—		48	19
Red Star Belgrade	2026–27	Serbian SuperLiga	2	1	—		0	0	–		3 (Note: Three appearances and two goals in UEFA Champions League)	2	—		5	3
Red Star Belgrade	Total		61	27	—		9	6	–		28	9	—		98	42
Career total			234	73	9	3	17	5	8	3	36	11	11	1	316	96

== Honours ==
Red Star Belgrade

- Serbian SuperLiga: 2024–25, 2025–26
- Serbian Cup: 2024–25, 2025–26
