= Kyrylo Matvyeyev =

Ukrainian footballer

Personal information
- Full name: Kyrylo Olehovych Matvyeyev
- Date of birth: 22 June 1996 (age 30)
- Place of birth: Donetsk, Ukraine
- Height: 1.80 m (5 ft 11 in)
- Position: Left winger

Team information
- Current team: Lok Stendal
- Number: 21

Youth career
- 2009–2013: Shakhtar Donetsk

Senior career*
Years	Team	Apps	(Gls)
2013–2015	Metalurh Donetsk	0	(0)
2015–2016	Stal Dniprodzerzhynsk	0	(0)
2016–2018	Arsenal Kyiv	41	(0)
2018–2019	Mariupol	0	(0)
2019	Strand 08	4	(0)
2019–2020	Phönix Lübeck	13	(1)
2020–2022	Yarud Mariupol	35	(3)
2022–	Lok Stendal	12	(3)
- * Club domestic league appearances and goals as of 11 March 2023

Kyrylo Olehovych Matvyeyev (Ukrainian: Кирило Олегович Матвєєв; born 22 June 1996) is a Ukrainian professional footballer who plays as a left winger for Lok Stendal.

== Career ==
Matvyeyev is a product of the Shakhtar Donetsk academy.

He spent his career as a player for FC Metalurh Donetsk and FC Stal in the Ukrainian Premier League Reserves, but never made a debut in the Ukrainian Premier League. In July 2016 he signed a contract with the Ukrainian First League's team FC Arsenal Kyiv.

== Personal life ==
Matvyeyev is a son of the retired Ukrainian professional footballer Oleh Matvyeyev.
