= Vadym Yanchak =

Ukrainian footballer

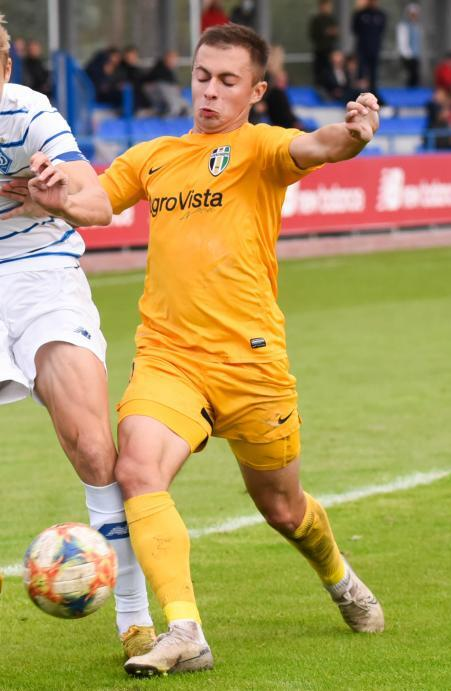
- Yanchak playing for Oleksandriya U-21 in 2020

Personal information
- Full name: Vadym Ihorovych Yanchak
- Date of birth: 7 February 1999 (age 27)
- Place of birth: Sambir, Lviv Oblast, Ukraine
- Height: 1.72 m (5 ft 8 in)
- Position: Midfielder

Team information
- Current team: Kormil Yavoriv
- Number: 11

Youth career
- –2014: KOLIPS Shturm Kostopil
- 2014–2018: Lviv

Senior career*
Years	Team	Apps	(Gls)
2017–2019	Lviv	21	(0)
2019–2020	Lokomotíva Košice	4	(1)
2019–2020	→ Poprad (loan)	13	(0)
2020–2021	Oleksandriya	1	(0)
2021–2022	Feniks Pidmonastyr	9	(0)
2023–2025	Feniks Pidmonastyr	49	(11)
2025	Hirnyk Novoyavorivsk	9	(6)
2025–2026	Feniks-Mariupol	12	(0)
2026–	Kormil Yavoriv	0	(0)

International career^{‡}
2019	Ukraine U20	2	(0)
2018	Ukraine U21	1	(1)
- * Club domestic league appearances and goals as of 15 March 2026 ‡ National team caps and goals as of 1 May 2021

Vadym Ihorovych Yanchak (Ukrainian: Вадим Ігорович Янчак; born 7 February 1999) is a Ukrainian football player. He plays for Ukrainian team Kormil Yavoriv.

== Club career ==
He made his Ukrainian Second League debut for Lviv on 19 August 2017 in a game against Nyva Vinnytsia.
