= Lipe Veloso =

Brazilian footballer (born 1997)

Personal information
- Full name: Luiz Felipe Veloso Santos
- Date of birth: April 7, 1997 (age 29)
- Place of birth: Ribeirão Preto, Brazil
- Height: 1.79 m (5 ft 10 1/2 in)
- Position: Midfielder

Youth career
- 2013–2015: Corinthians
- 2015: Flamengo
- 2015–2016: Palmeiras

Senior career*
Years	Team	Apps	(Gls)
2017–2018	Tokyo	1	(0)
2017–2018	→ Tokyo U-23	41	(8)
2019–2020	Lviv	11	(1)
2020	→ Torpedo-BelAZ Zhodino (loan)	27	(6)
2021	Riga	9	(1)
2021	→ Torpedo-BelAZ Zhodino (loan)	12	(0)
2022	Torpedo-BelAZ Zhodino	16	(1)
- * Club domestic league appearances and goals as of 21 July 2023

Luiz Felipe Veloso Santos (born April 7, 1997), known as Lipe Veloso, is a Brazilian football player.

== Career ==
Lipe Veloso joined J1 League club FC Tokyo in 2017.

== Club statistics ==
Updated to 22 February 2018.

Club performance			League		Cup		League Cup		Total	
Season	Club	League	Apps	Goals	Apps	Goals	Apps	Goals	Apps	Goals
Japan			League		Emperor's Cup		J. League Cup		Total	
2017	FC Tokyo	J1 League	1	0	0	0	0	0	1	0
2017	FC Tokyo U-23	J3 League	16	4	–		–		16	4
Total			17	4	0	0	0	0	17	4
