= List of Associação Portuguesa de Desportos seasons =

This is a list of seasons played by Associação Portuguesa de Desportos in Brazilian (state and national leagues) and South American football, from 1971 (year of Brasileirão's creation) to the most recent completed season.

== Seasons ==
=== Brasileirão era ===
Season	Domestic leagues									Copa do Brasil	South America	Other	Top scorer	
Season	Tournament	FP	Pld.	W	D	L	GS	GA	Pts.	Copa do Brasil	South America	Other	Name	Goals
1970	Paulista A1	6th	18	6	6	6	18	17	18	—	—	—	—	
1971	Paulista A1	4th	22	12	4	6	40	28	28	—	—	—	—	
1971	Série A	17th	19	6	3	10	16	24	15	—	—	—	—	
1972	Paulista A1	5th	22	8	7	7	31	25	23	—	—	—	—	
1972	Série A	23rd	25	4	9	12	25	37	17	—	—	—	—	
1973	Paulista A1	1st (Note: Title split with Santos.)	23	9	11	13	26	15	29	—	—	—	—	
1973	Série A	29th	28	7	11	10	33	31	25	—	—	—	—	
1974	Paulista A1	5th	26	10	11	5	28	17	31	—	—	—	—	
1974	Série A	18th	24	6	13	5	23	22	25	—	—	—	—	
1975	Paulista A1	2nd	34	19	9	6	47	23	47	—	—	—	—	
1975	Série A	12th	23	9	8	6	28	21	30	—	—	—	—	
1976	Paulista A1	7th	28	12	7	9	38	33	31	—	—	—	—	
1976	Série A	18th	20	4	6	10	22	28	17	—	—	—	—	
1977	Paulista A1	7th	44	14	17	13	56	46	50	—	—	—	—	
1977	Série A	29th	14	6	2	6	14	12	17	—	—	—	—	
1978	Paulista A1	10th	47	11	14	22	49	74	36	—	—	—	—	
1978	Série A	11th	26	14	8	4	41	18	38	—	—	—	—	
1979	Paulista A1	8th	43	12	20	11	50	47	44	—	—	—	—	
1980	Paulista A1	5th	42	19	11	12	51	46	49	—	—	—	—	
1980	Série A	40th	9	2	1	6	7	19	5	—	—	—	—	
1981	Paulista A1	7th	44	15	15	14	41	41	45	—	—	—	Wilson Carrasco	7
1981	Série A	17th	15	7	6	2	19	13	20	—	—	—	Wilson Carrasco	7
1982	Paulista A1	11th	38	11	14	13	34	36	36	—	—	—	—	
1982	Série B	31st	5	2	1	2	8	8	5	—	—	—	—	
1983	Paulista A1	5th	44	18	14	12	45	34	50	—	—	—	—	
1983	Série B	23rd	7	3	3	1	9	5	9	—	—	—	—	
1984	Paulista A1	14th	38	11	8	19	29	41	30	—	—	—	Mirandinha	11
1984	Série A	7th	22	7	9	6	29	24	23	—	—	—	Mirandinha	11
1985	Paulista A1	2nd	42	19	17	6	55	34	55	—	—	—	Toninho	4
1985	Série A	26th	20	4	7	9	19	26	15	—	—	—	Toninho	4
1986	Paulista A1	5th	38	16	11	11	52	37	43	—	—	—	Héder	11
1986	Série A	10th	28	11	12	5	31	23	34	—	—	—	Héder	11
1987	Paulista A1	6th	38	14	14	10	38	30	42	—	—	—	Cláudio Adão	13
1987	Série B	7th	14	6	3	5	13	10	15	—	—	—	Cláudio Adão	13
1988	Paulista A1	9th	19	7	5	7	24	22	19	—	—	—	Kita	8
1988	Série A	9th	23	14	3	6	28	21	43	—	—	—	Kita	8
1989	Paulista A1	5th	25	10	11	4	38	19	32	—	—	—	Roberto Dinamite	9
1989	Série A	7th	18	7	6	5	21	13	20	—	—	—	Roberto Dinamite	9
1990	Paulista A1	9th	35	8	21	6	40	33	37	—	—	—	Toninho; Lê	9
1990	Série A	10th	19	5	9	5	14	15	19	—	—	—	Toninho; Lê	9
1991	Paulista A1	4th	32	15	8	9	33	27	38	—	—	—	Jorge Aravena	10
1991	Série A	10th	19	5	9	5	14	15	19	—	—	—	Jorge Aravena	10
1992	Paulista A1	6th	32	13	12	7	42	28	38	—	—	—	Bentinho	15
1992	Série A	16th	19	4	7	8	21	26	15	—	—	—	Bentinho	15
1993	Paulista A1	19th	30	8	10	12	48	52	26	—	—	Rio – SP; Group Stage	Bentinho	27
1993	Série A	9th	16	8	3	5	27	21	19	—	—	Rio – SP; Group Stage	Bentinho	27
1994	Paulista A1	8th	30	9	10	11	40	49	28	—	—	—	Caio	15
1994	Série A	10th	25	9	8	8	26	20	26	—	—	—	Caio	15
1995	Paulista A1	3rd	36	19	10	7	55	34	68	—	—	—	Paulinho McLaren	20
1995	Série A	10th	23	9	8	6	28	28	35	—	—	—	Paulinho McLaren	20
1996	Paulista A1	3rd	30	14	11	5	53	30	53	—	—	—	Tiba	15
1996	Série A	2nd	29	14	4	11	40	34	46	—	—	—	Tiba	15
1997	Paulista A1	5th	23	12	7	4	46	33	43	Round of 16	Copa CONMEBOL; 1st Round	—	Rodrigo Fabri	30
1997	Série A	5th	31	13	10	8	50	36	49	Round of 16	Copa CONMEBOL; 1st Round	—	Rodrigo Fabri	30
1998	Paulista A1	3rd	22	9	7	6	42	34	34	1st Round	—	—	Leandro Amaral	29
1998	Série A	4th	29	13	9	7	52	42	48	1st Round	—	—	Leandro Amaral	29
1999	Paulista A1	5th	26	16	4	6	49	35	52	Round of 16	—	—	Leandro Amaral	20
1999	Série A	21st	21	4	6	11	27	31	18	Round of 16	—	—	Leandro Amaral	20
2000	Paulista A1	6th	26	11	9	6	51	36	42	Round of 16	—	—	Leandro Amaral	22
2000	João Havelange	21st	24	9	5	10	34	43	32	Round of 16	—	—	Leandro Amaral	22
2001	Paulista A1	9th	15	6	2	7	28	34	21	Round of 16	—	—	Ricardo Oliveira	24
2001	Série A	13th	27	11	4	12	31	33	37	Round of 16	—	—	Ricardo Oliveira	24
2002	Rio – SP (Note: In 2002, all São Paulo major clubs played the Rio-São Paulo Tournament as a state league, while the countryside clubs played in Campeonato Paulista.)	10th	15	6	2	7	27	37	20	Round of 16	—	—	Ricardo Oliveira	24
2002	Série A	23rd	25	7	6	12	26	40	27	Round of 16	—	—	Ricardo Oliveira	24
2003	Paulista A1	13th	12	4	4	4	20	22	16	—	—	—	Alex Alves	23
2003	Série B	13th	23	7	9	7	39	33	30	—	—	—	Alex Alves	23
2004	Paulista A1	14th	9	2	4	3	14	16	10	—	—	—	Lucas Pereira	9
2004	Série B	11th	23	8	7	8	31	31	31	—	—	—	Lucas Pereira	9
2005	Paulista A1	10th	19	6	6	7	27	32	24	—	—	—	Cléber	18
2005	Série B	4th	33	14	7	12	51	45	49	—	—	—	Cléber	18
2006	Paulista A1	18th	19	5	3	11	21	30	18	—	—	—	Sousa	12
2006	Série B	14th	38	11	12	15	47	58	45	—	—	—	Sousa	12
2007	Paulista A2	1st	25	15	7	3	46	25	52	2nd Round	—	—	Diogo	27
2007	Série B	3rd	38	17	12	9	63	46	63	2nd Round	—	—	Diogo	27
2008	Paulista A1	10th	19	7	7	5	21	17	28	Round of 16	—	—	Jonas	10
2008	Série A	19th	38	9	11	18	48	70	38	Round of 16	—	—	Jonas	10
2009	Paulista A1	5th	19	11	4	4	27	17	37	1st Round	—	—	Fellype Gabriel	11
2009	Série B	5th	38	18	8	12	53	45	62	1st Round	—	—	Fellype Gabriel	11
2010	Paulista A1	6th	19	9	4	6	29	20	31	Round of 16	—	—	Héverton	24
2010	Série B	5th	38	19	15	14	68	53	62	Round of 16	—	—	Héverton	24
2011	Paulista A1	6th	20	8	4	8	24	25	28	1st Round	—	—	Edno	13
2011	Série B	1st	38	10	15	13	39	41	45	1st Round	—	—	Edno	13
2012	Paulista A1	17th	19	4	6	9	22	29	18	Round of 16	—	—	Bruno Mineiro	14
2012	Série A	16th	38	10	15	13	39	41	45	Round of 16	—	—	Bruno Mineiro	14
2013	Paulista A2	1st	27	18	4	5	43	23	58	1st Round	Sudamericana; 1st Round	—	Gilberto	14
2013	Série A	17th	38	12	12	14	50	46	48	1st Round	Sudamericana; 1st Round	—	Gilberto	14
2014	Paulista A1	12th	15	6	2	7	23	19	20	1st Round	—	—	Henrique	7
2014	Série B	20th	38	4	13	21	27	56	25	1st Round	—	—	Henrique	7
2015	Paulista A1	18th	15	2	7	6	13	22	13	2nd Round	—	—	Guilherme Queiróz	12
2015	Série C	8th	20	9	3	8	31	26	30	2nd Round	—	—	Guilherme Queiróz	12
2016	Paulista A2	13th	19	6	6	7	21	25	24	2nd Round	—	—	Gustavo Tocantins	7
2016	Série C	18th	18	4	2	12	13	26	14	2nd Round	—	—	Gustavo Tocantins	7
2017	Paulista A2	13th	19	7	2	10	18	24	23	2nd round	—	Copa Paulista; 4th	Guilherme Queiróz	14
2017	Série D	43rd	6	2	1	3	5	4	7	2nd round	—	Copa Paulista; 4th	Guilherme Queiróz	14
2018	Paulista A2	12th	15	3	7	5	14	18	16	—	—	Copa Paulista; 17th	Fernandinho	6
2019	Paulista A2	11th	15	4	5	6	19	23	17	—	—	Copa Paulista; 19th	Anderson Cavalo	5
2020	Paulista A2	5th	17	8	3	6	16	12	27	—	—	Copa Paulista; 1st	Adilson Bahia	8
2021	Paulista A2	5th	17	6	7	4	22	17	25	—	—	Copa Paulista; 3rd	Lucas Douglas	9
2021	Série D	23rd	16	7	6	3	21	13	27	—	—	Copa Paulista; 3rd	Lucas Douglas	9
2022	Paulista A2	1st	21	13	7	1	29	8	46	—	—	Copa Paulista; 4th	Caio Mancha	12
2023	Paulista A1	14th	13	2	4	7	11	20	10	—	—	Copa Paulista; 6th	Chrigor	7
2024	Paulista A1	8th	13	3	2	8	8	17	11	—	—	Copa Paulista; 3rd	Maceió	8
2025	Paulista A1	12th	12	2	7	3	15	16	13	—	—	—	Cristiano	10
2025	Série D	17th	16	10	3	3	23	14	33	—	—	—	Cristiano	10
2026	Paulista A1									—	—		—	—
2026	Série D									—	—		—	—
