= Vicente (footballer, born 1996) =

Brazilian footballer

Personal information
- Full name: Vicente de Paula Mercedes
- Date of birth: 2 March 1996 (age 30)
- Place of birth: São Paulo, Brazil
- Height: 1.73 m (5 ft 8 in)
- Positions: Right-back; left winger

Youth career
- –2013: Osasco FC
- 2013–2016: Osasco Audax

Senior career*
Years	Team	Apps	(Gls)
2017	Atlético-PB		
2017	Osasco Audax	1	(1)
2017	Atlético-PB	14	(0)
2019	Lviv	14	(0)
2020	Bylis Ballsh	6	(0)
2021	Hirnyk-Sport Horishni Plavni	7	(0)
2021	VPK-Ahro Shevchenkivka	18	(0)
2022	Sertãozinho		
2023	São José	20	(2)
2023	Rio Branco-ES		
2024	SKA Brasil	7	(0)
2024–2025	Namdhari	18	(2)
- * Club domestic league appearances and goals as of 23:33, 23 March 2025 (UTC)

Vicente de Paula Mercedes (born 2 March 1996), known as Vicente, is a Brazilian professional footballer who plays as a forward.

== Career ==
Vicente made his Ukrainian Premier League debut for FC Lviv on 9 March 2019 in a game against FC Zorya Luhansk.
