= Kauê (footballer, born 1997) =

Brazilian footballer

Personal information
- Full name: Kauê da Silva
- Date of birth: 4 January 1997 (age 29)
- Place of birth: São Paulo, Brazil
- Height: 1.80 m (5 ft 11 in)
- Position: Forward

Youth career
- –2017: Palmeiras

Senior career*
Years	Team	Apps	(Gls)
2015–2019	Palmeiras	0	(0)
2017	→ Botafogo SP (loan)	5	(1)
2017	→ Oeste (loan)		
2017–2018	→ Linense (loan)	10	(1)
2018	→ Guarani (loan)		
2019	→ Lviv (loan)	3	(0)
2019	→ Sampaio Corrêa (loan)	4	(0)
2019	Vila Nova		
2020	Portuguesa		
2020	Portuguesa Santista	5	(0)
2021	Taubaté	10	(2)
2022	Mamoré	8	(2)
2023	Grêmio Anápolis		
2025	Caravaggio		
2026	PNG Hekari		
- * Club domestic league appearances and goals

Kauê da Silva, known simply as Kauê (born 4 January 1997) is a Brazilian professional football player.

== Club career ==
He made his Campeonato Paulista debut for Botafogo SP on 22 February 2017 in a game against Audax.

On 18 October 2020, Kauê joined Portuguesa Santista.
