= Murilo Cadina =

Brazilian footballer

Personal information
- Full name: Murilo Vinicius Leite Cadina
- Date of birth: 27 January 1997 (age 29)
- Place of birth: Sorocaba, Brazil
- Height: 1.73 m (5 ft 8 in)
- Position: Defensive midfielder

Team information
- Current team: Manchego

Youth career
- 2012–2016: Santos
- 2016–2017: Palmeiras

Senior career*
Years	Team	Apps	(Gls)
2018	Barretos	0	(0)
2019	Lviv	7	(0)
2019	Ergotelis	0	(0)
2021–	Manchego	7	(0)
- * Club domestic league appearances and goals as of 12 December 2021

Murilo Vinicius Leite Cadina (born 27 January 1997) is a Brazilian footballer who plays as a defensive midfielder for Spanish club CD Manchego Ciudad Real.

== Club career ==
Born in Sorocaba, São Paulo, Cadina started his career with Santos' youth setup. On 11 March 2016, he signed a two-year deal with Palmeiras. After spending nearly two years in Palmeiras' under-20 squad, Cadina was announced at Barretos on 28 February 2018. However, he only featured once as an unused substitute before leaving the club.

On 20 February 2019, Cadina moved abroad and signed a four-year contract with FC Lviv. He made his Ukrainian Premier League debut three days later, in a game against FC Chornomorets Odesa. He eventually terminated his contract with the club in the summer of 2019, in order to sign a three-year deal with Greek Super League 2 side Ergotelis in July 2019. His contract was however terminated during pre-season.
