= Maksym Brama =

Ukrainian footballer

Personal information
- Full name: Maksym Andriyovych Brama
- Date of birth: 1 February 2002 (age 24)
- Place of birth: Vynnyky, Ukraine
- Height: 1.76 m (5 ft 9 in)
- Position: Defender

Youth career
- 2011–2014: Youth Sportive School #4 Lviv
- 2014–2018: Rukh Vynnyky
- 2018–2019: Lviv

Senior career*
Years	Team	Apps	(Gls)
2019–2021	Lviv	1	(0)

International career^{‡}
2019	Ukraine U18	1	(0)
- * Club domestic league appearances and goals as of 20 September 2021 ‡ National team caps and goals as of 15 April 2021

Maksym Andriyovych Brama (Ukrainian: Максим Андрійович Брама; born 1 February 2002) is a Ukrainian professional football defender who played for FC Lviv.

== Career ==
Brama is a product of the different local (including FC Lviv) youth sportive school systems.

He played for FC Lviv in the Ukrainian Premier League Reserves and in May 2019 Brama was promoted to the senior squad of this team. He made his debut in the Ukrainian Premier League for FC Lviv as a substituted on 30 May 2019, playing in a lost match against FC Shakhtar Donetsk.
