= Maksym Khimchak =

Ukrainian footballer

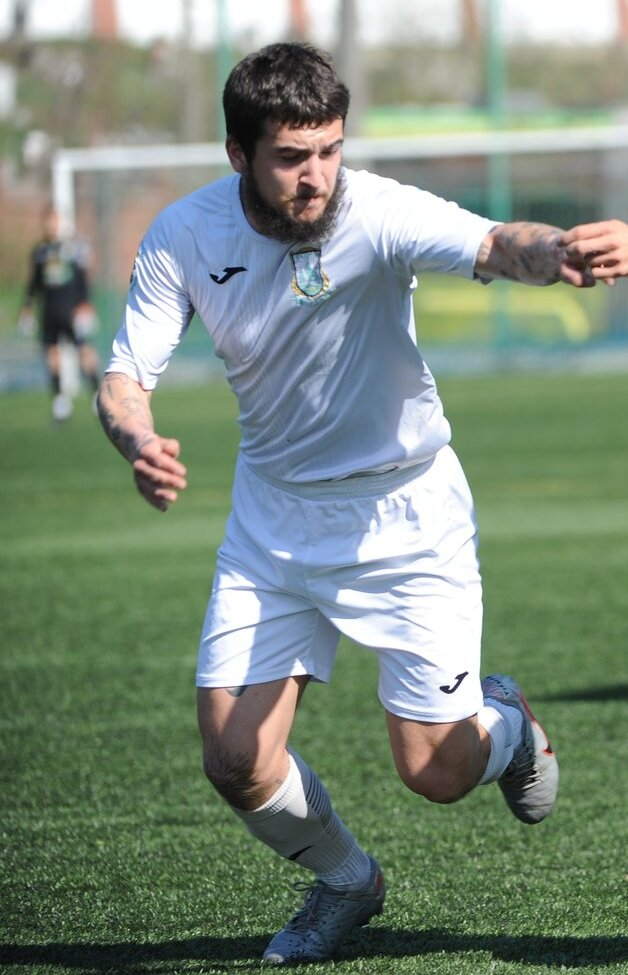
- Khimchak with FC Lehin Briukhovychi in 2023

Personal information
- Full name: Maksym Yaroslavovych Khimchak
- Date of birth: 13 February 2000 (age 26)
- Place of birth: Ukraine
- Height: 1.74 m (5 ft 9 in)
- Position: Midfielder

Team information
- Current team: Lviv

Youth career
- 201?–2017: Lviv

Senior career*
Years	Team	Apps	(Gls)
2017–2018	Veres Rivne	0	(0)
2018–	Lviv	1	(0)
2021–2022	→ Vovchansk (loan)	4	(0)
- * Club domestic league appearances and goals as of 1 July 2022

Maksym Yaroslavovych Khimchak (Ukrainian: Максим Ярославович Хімчак; born 13 February 2000) is a Ukrainian professional football midfielder who plays for FC Lviv.

== Career ==
Khimchak is a product of the Lviv youth sportive school.

He played for FC Veres and FC Lviv in the Ukrainian Premier League Reserves and in January 2019 Khimchak was promoted to the senior squad of the last team. He made his debut in the Ukrainian Premier League for FC Lviv as a substituted on 30 May 2019, playing in a lost match against FC Shakhtar Donetsk.
