= Vitaliy Mykytyn =

Ukrainian footballer

Personal information
- Full name: Vitaliy Ihorovych Mykytyn
- Date of birth: 4 November 1998 (age 28)
- Place of birth: Lviv, Ukraine
- Height: 1.74 m (5 ft 9 in)
- Position: Forward

Youth career
- –2015: Karpaty Lviv

Senior career*
Years	Team	Apps	(Gls)
2015–2017	Karpaty Lviv	0	(0)
2017	SKK Demnia	?	(?)
2018	Veres Rivne	2	(0)
2018–2019	Lviv	1	(0)
2019–2020	Veres Rivne	12	(0)

International career
2014–2015	Ukraine U17	3	(0)
- * Club domestic league appearances and goals as of 3 September 2020

Vitaliy Ihorovych Mykytyn (Ukrainian: Віталій Ігорович Микитин; born 4 November 1998) is a Ukrainian football player.

== Club career ==
He made his Ukrainian Premier League debut for FC Veres Rivne on 29 April 2018 in a game against FC Zorya Luhansk.
