= Julio Cesar (footballer, born 1995) =

Brazilian footballer (born 1995)

Personal information
- Full name: Julio Cesar Moreira Ribeiro
- Date of birth: 18 April 1995 (age 31)
- Place of birth: Cerqueira César, São Paulo, Brazil
- Height: 1.80 m (5 ft 11 in)
- Position: Striker

Youth career
- Guaratinguetá

Senior career*
Years	Team	Apps	(Gls)
2016	Guaratinguetá	9	(0)
2018	Veres Rivne	8	(1)
2018–2019	Lviv	10	(0)
2020	Lagarto	3	(0)
2021	Xagħra United		
- * Club domestic league appearances and goals as of 22:05, 23 February 2023 (UTC)

Julio Cesar Moreira Ribeiro (born 18 April 1995), commonly known as Julio Cesar, is a Brazilian footballer who plays as a striker, most recently for Xagħra United.

== Career ==
Julio Cesar is a product of Guaratinguetá youth sportive system and in 2016 he played for this team in the Campeonato Paulista Série A3.

In February 2018 he signed a contract with the Ukrainian Premier League's FC Veres Rivne.

In 2021, Cesar played for Maltese club Xagħra United.
