= Marthã =

Brazilian footballer

Personal information
- Full name: Marthã Fernando Gonçalves Pimenta
- Date of birth: 20 June 1997 (age 29)
- Place of birth: São Paulo, Brazil
- Height: 1.81 m (5 ft 11 in)
- Position: Midfielder

Team information
- Current team: Ituano

Youth career
- 2012–2013: São Paulo
- 2014–2015: Desportivo Brasil
- 2016: Palmeiras
- 2016–2017: Ponte Preta

Senior career*
| Years | Team | Apps | (Gls) |
| 2018–2019 | Lviv | 40 | (0) |
| 2020–2021 | Ceará | 14 | (1) |
| 2021 | → CRB (loan) | 33 | (5) |
| 2022 | CRB | 36 | (0) |
| 2023 | Santo André | 8 | (0) |
| 2023 | Ituano | 17 | (1) |
| 2024 | Londrina | 23 | (1) |
| 2025 | Boavista | 17 | (0) |
| 2026 | Operário-MS | | |
| 2026– | Ituano | 26 | (0) |
- * Club domestic league appearances and goals as of 11 November 2026

Marthã Fernando Gonçalves Pimenta (born 20 June 1997), simply known as Marthã, is a Brazilian footballer who plays as a midfielder for Ituano.

== Club career ==
He made his Ukrainian Premier League debut for FC Lviv on 22 July 2018 in a game against FC Arsenal Kyiv.

== Honours ==
Ceará

- Copa do Nordeste: 2020
