= Oleksandr Holikov =

Ukrainian footballer

Personal information
- Full name: Oleksandr Vladyslavovych Holikov
- Date of birth: 13 November 1991 (age 34)
- Place of birth: Donetsk, Ukraine
- Height: 1.80 m (5 ft 11 in)
- Position: Right back

Youth career
- –2008: Shakhtar Donetsk

Senior career*
Years	Team	Apps	(Gls)
2007–2012	Shakhtar Donetsk	0	(0)
2007–2011	→ Shakhtar-3 Donetsk	33	(1)
2011–2012	→ Zorya Luhansk (loan)	0	(0)
2012	Olimpik Donetsk	11	(0)
2014–2015	Makiyivvuhillya Makiyivka	20	(0)
2015	Enerhiya Nova Kakhovka	9	(0)
2015–2016	Sumy	19	(1)
2016–2017	Arsenal Kyiv	15	(0)
2017–2018	Poltava	43	(1)
2018–2019	Lviv	16	(0)
2019	Chornomorets Odesa	22	(0)
2020–2021	Obolon Kyiv	26	(0)
2021–2022	LNZ Cherkasy	9	(0)
2022	Spartak Medzev	7	(6)
2022–2024	Košice	38	(1)

International career
2009	Ukraine U18	2	(0)
2009	Ukraine U19	3	(0)
- * Club domestic league appearances and goals as of 21 July 2024

Oleksandr Vladyslavovych Holikov (Ukrainian: Олександр Владиславович Голіков; born 13 November 1991) is a Ukrainian football player.

== Club career ==
He made his Ukrainian Second League debut for FC Shakhtar-3 Donetsk on 16 May 2008 in a game against PFC Shakhtar Sverdlovsk.
