= Augusto (footballer, born 1992) =

Brazilian footballer

Personal information
- Date of birth: 22 February 1992 (age 34)
- Place of birth: São Paulo, Brazil
- Height: 1.72 m (5 ft 8 in)
- Position: Midfielder

Youth career
- –2012: Atlético Mogi

Senior career*
Years	Team	Apps	(Gls)
2015	Guaratinguetá	26	(0)
2018–2019	Lviv	11	(0)
- * Club domestic league appearances and goals as of 17 April 2019

Augusto Bruno da Silva, known as Augusto (born 22 February 1992) is a Brazilian football player. He played in Ukraine for Lviv.

== Club career ==
He made his Ukrainian Premier League debut for FC Lviv on 22 July 2018 in a game against FC Arsenal Kyiv.
