= Yuriy Putrash =

Ukrainian footballer

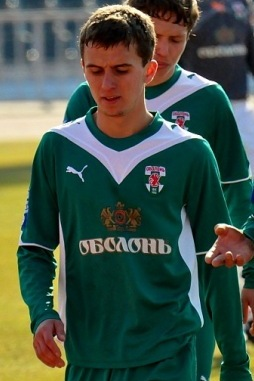
- Yuriy Putrash

Personal information
- Full name: Yuriy Volodymyrovych Putrash
- Date of birth: 29 January 1990 (age 36)
- Place of birth: Mizhhiria, Ukrainian SSR
- Height: 1.78 m (5 ft 10 in)
- Position: Defender

Team information
- Current team: FC Mynai
- Number: 77

Youth career
- 2003–2007: Sportive School Uzhhorod

Senior career*
Years	Team	Apps	(Gls)
2007–2008	Metalurh Donetsk	0	(0)
2008–2009	Nyva Ternopil	42	(1)
2010–2011	Obolon Kyiv	16	(0)
2011–2014	Tavriya Simferopol	54	(1)
2014–2015	Chornomorets Odesa	6	(0)
2015	Stal Dniprodzerzhynsk	10	(2)
2016–2017	Oleksandriya	11	(0)
2018	Akzhayik	3	(0)
2018	Lviv	6	(0)
2019–	Mynai	1	(0)

International career
2010	Ukraine-20	2	(0)
2010–2012	Ukraine-21	14	(1)
- * Club domestic league appearances and goals as of 12:43, 24 May 2019 (UTC)

Yuriy Putrash (Ukrainian: Юрій Володимирович Путраш; born 29 January 1990 in Mizhhirya, Zakarpattia Oblast, Ukrainian SSR) is a professional Ukrainian football defender who plays for FC Mynai.

== International career ==
He was called up to the Ukraine national under-20 football team for match against Iran-20 and made his debut on match 10 August 2010.
