= Vladyslav Pryimak =

Ukrainian footballer

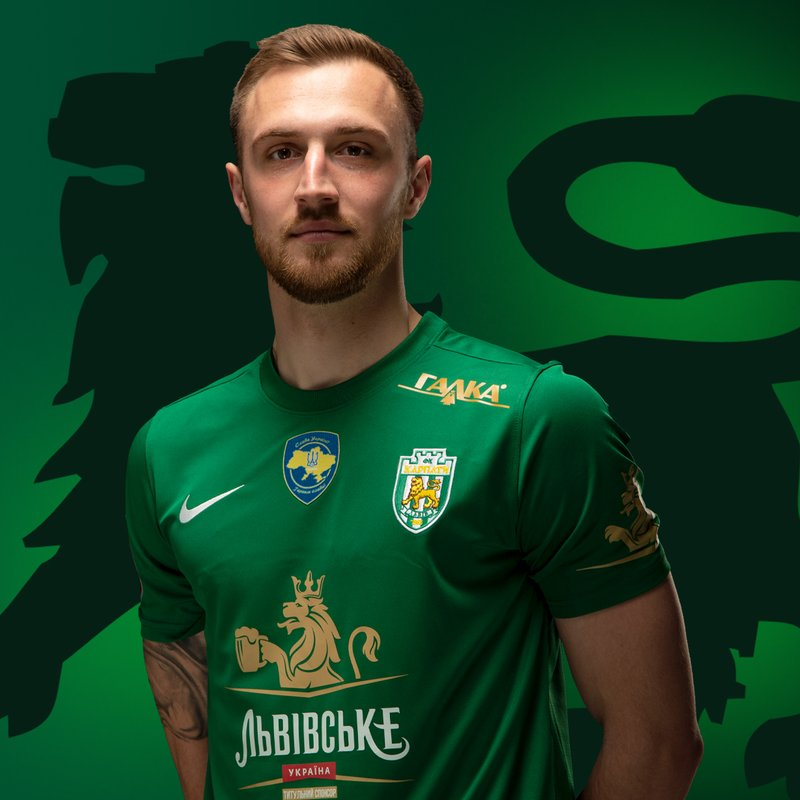

Personal information
- Full name: Vladyslav Andriyovych Pryimak
- Date of birth: 30 August 1996 (age 30)
- Place of birth: Simferopol, Ukraine
- Height: 1.85 m (6 ft 1 in)
- Position: Centre back

Team information
- Current team: Obolon Kyiv
- Number: 3

Youth career
- 2009–2012: Prykarpattia Ivano-Frankivsk
- 2012–2015: Dynamo Kyiv

Senior career*
Years	Team	Apps	(Gls)
2015–2016	Nika Ivano-Frankivsk	16	(0)
2016–2017	Prykarpattia Ivano-Frankivsk	43	(5)
2018	Veres Rivne	8	(0)
2018–2020	Lviv	46	(1)
2020–2021	Volyn Lutsk	25	(2)
2021–2023	Karpaty Lviv	35	(5)
2023–26	Obolon Kyiv	70	(3)
2026 -	Bukovyna Chernivtsi	0	(0)
- * Club domestic league appearances and goals as of 12/9/26 @ 05:08:55AM(AEST)

Vladyslav Andriyovych Pryimak (Ukrainian: Владислав Андрійович Приймак; born 30 August 1996) is a Ukrainian professional footballer who plays as a defender for Obolon Kyiv.

== Career ==
Pryimak is a product of the Prykarpattia Ivano-Frankivsk academy. His first trainer was Ihor Hohil.

He spent his early career as a player in the amateur and second-tier levels and in December 2017 Pryimak signed a contract with Ukrainian Premier League team NK Veres Rivne.
