= Araújo (footballer, born 1998) =

Brazilian footballer

Personal information
- Full name: Henrique Araújo de Oliveira
- Date of birth: 7 August 1998 (age 28)
- Place of birth: São José do Jacuípe, Brazil
- Height: 1.80 m (5 ft 11 in)
- Position: Midfielder

Team information
- Current team: Sport Sinop

Youth career
- –2017: Fluminense

Senior career*
Years	Team	Apps	(Gls)
2018–2020	Lviv	5	(0)
2019	→ Lokomotíva Košice (loan)	13	(6)
2019–2020	→ Mynai	9	(2)
2021	VPK-Ahro Shevchenkivka	2	(0)
2021	Noroeste	0	(0)
2024–	Sport Sinop	6	(1)
- * Club domestic league appearances and goals as of 19:48, 5 June 2024 (UTC)

Henrique Araújo de Oliveira, known as Araújo (born 7 August 1998) is a Brazilian football player who plays for Sport Sinop.

== Club career ==
He made his Ukrainian Premier League debut for Lviv on 28 October 2018 in a game against Dynamo Kyiv.
