= Serhiy Borzenko =

Ukrainian footballer

Personal information
- Full name: Serhiy Oleksandrovych Borzenko
- Date of birth: 24 June 1986 (age 40)
- Place of birth: Komsomolske, Ukrainian SSR
- Height: 1.82 m (5 ft 11 1/2 in)
- Position: Defender

Youth career
- 2001–2003: Arsenal Kharkiv

Senior career*
Years	Team	Apps	(Gls)
2002	Arsenal Kharkiv	1	(0)
2005–2008	Arsenal Kharkiv	98	(14)
2009	Poltava	11	(1)
2009–2013	Helios Kharkiv	132	(13)
2014	Tytan Armyansk	8	(0)
2014–2015	Kremin Kremenchuk	29	(9)
2015–2016	Olimpik Donetsk	17	(1)
2016–2018	Veres Rivne	60	(9)
2018–2020	Lviv	53	(1)
2021–2022	Vovchansk	21	(2)
2022–	FSC Stará Říše		
- * Club domestic league appearances and goals as of 31 July 2022

Serhiy Borzenko (Ukrainian: Сергій Олександрович Борзенко; born 22 June 1986) is a professional Ukrainian footballer who plays as a midfielder.

He is a product of the FC Arsenal Kharkiv sports school system, and later played for clubs from Kharkiv region and East Ukraine.
