= Semen Datsenko =

Ukrainian footballer

Personal information
- Full name: Semen Oleksandrovych Datsenko
- Date of birth: 10 May 1994 (age 32)
- Place of birth: Poltava, Ukraine
- Height: 1.90 m (6 ft 3 in)
- Position: Centre-back

Team information
- Current team: Ahrobiznes Volochysk
- Number: 44

Youth career
- 2008–2011: Metalist Kharkiv

Senior career*
| Years | Team | Apps | (Gls) |
| 2012 | Oleksandriya | 0 | (0) |
| 2012–2014 | Tavriya Simferopol | 8 | (0) |
| 2014–2015 | Illichivets Mariupol | 3 | (0) |
| 2015–2016 | Metalist Kharkiv | 2 | (0) |
| 2016–2017 | Inhulets Petrove | 15 | (1) |
| 2017 | Shirak | 6 | (0) |
| 2017–2018 | Mosta | 1 | (0) |
| 2018 | Kalush | 1 | (0) |
| 2018 | Lviv | 0 | (0) |
| 2019 | Podillya Khmelnytskyi | 8 | (0) |
| 2019 | Nyva Ternopil | 8 | (0) |
| 2020–2021 | LNZ Cherkasy | 4 | (0) |
| 2021–2022 | Trostianets | 21 | (1) |
| 2022 | Bukovyna Chernivtsi | 7 | (0) |
| 2023 | Hirnyk-Sport Horishni Plavni | 8 | (1) |
| 2023– | Ahrobiznes Volochysk | 16 | (0) |
- * Club domestic league appearances and goals as of 20 June 2024

Semen Oleksandrovych Datsenko (Ukrainian: Семен Олександрович Даценко; born 10 May 1994) is a Ukrainian professional footballer who plays as a centre-back for Ahrobiznes Volochysk.

== Career ==
Datsenko attended Metalist Kharkiv academy. He made his debut for Tavriya Simferopol played in the main-squad team against Volyn Lutsk on 21 July 2013 in Ukrainian Premier League.
