= Oleksiy Zinkevych =

Ukrainian footballer

Personal information
- Full name: Oleksiy Valeriyovych Zinkevych
- Date of birth: 12 May 1997 (age 29)
- Place of birth: Volodymyr-Volynskyi, Ukraine
- Height: 1.86 m (6 ft 1 in)
- Position: Midfielder

Youth career
- 2009–2010: FC BRV-VIK Volodymyr-Volynskyi
- 2010–2011: Shakhtar Donetsk
- 2011–2013: FC BRV-VIK Volodymyr-Volynskyi

Senior career*
Years	Team	Apps	(Gls)
2013–2015	Volyn Lutsk	1	(0)
2016–2018	Shakhtar Donetsk	0	(0)
2018	→ Oleksandriya (loan)	0	(0)
2018–2019	Volyn Lutsk	16	(0)
2019	Ahrobiznes Volochysk	14	(0)
2020	Chornomorets Odesa	0	(0)
2020–2021	Nyva Ternopil	6	(0)
2022	Kosovia Kosów Lacki	10	(9)
2022–2023	Podlasie Sokołów Podlaski	19	(25)
2023–2024	Pogoń Grodzisk Mazowiecki	34	(19)
2024–2025	Pogoń Siedlce	14	(0)

International career
2012–2013	Ukraine U16	4	(0)
2013–2014	Ukraine U17	10	(1)
2015	Ukraine U18	1	(0)
2016	Ukraine U19	1	(0)
- * Club domestic league appearances and goals as of 10:43, 19 January 2025 (UTC)

Oleksiy Valeriyovych Zinkevych (Ukrainian: Олексій Валерійович Зінкевич; born 12 May 1997) is a Ukrainian professional footballer who plays as a midfielder.

== Career ==
Zinkevych began his playing career in the sportive school in Volodymyr-Volynskyi. In 2013, he joined Ukrainian Premier League side Volyn Lutsk. He made his league debut on 14 July 2013 against Dynamo Kyiv.

== Honours ==
Pogoń Grodzisk Wielkopolski

- III liga, group I: 2023–24
- Polish Cup (Masovia regionals): 2023–24
