= Vasyl Bilyi =

Ukrainian association football player

Personal information
- Full name: Vasyl Ivanovych Bilyi
- Date of birth: 13 March 1990 (age 36)
- Place of birth: Truskavets, Ukrainian SSR
- Height: 1.86 m (6 ft 1 in)
- Position: Defender

Team information
- Current team: FC Kulykiv-Bilka

Youth career
- 2006–2007: Morshyn

Senior career*
Years	Team	Apps	(Gls)
2007–2008	Arsenal Kyiv	0	(0)
2008–2009	Lviv	0	(0)
2008–2009	→ Lviv-2	12	(0)
2009–2012	Skala Stryi	45	(4)
2010–2011	→ Skala-2 Morshyn	8	(2)
2012	Yednist' Plysky	15	(3)
2013	Nyva Ternopil	24	(0)
2014–2015	Stal Dniprodzerzhynsk	24	(4)
2015–2016	Naftovyk-Ukrnafta Okhtyrka	15	(1)
2016–2017	Veres Rivne	23	(2)
2017–2018	Rukh Vynnyky	29	(0)
2018	Lviv	2	(0)
2019	Altai Semey	23	(2)
2020	Nyva Ternopil	0	(0)
2020–2021	Obolon Kyiv	25	(1)
2021	Viktoriya Mykolaivka	13	(0)
2022–2023	Yunist Verkhnya Bilka		
2023–	FC Kulykiv-Bilka		
- * Club domestic league appearances and goals

Vasyl Ivanovych Bilyi (Ukrainian: Василь Іванович Білий; born 13 March 1990) is a professional Ukrainian football defender. He played in the different Ukrainian clubs in the Ukrainian First League and the Ukrainian Second League and in 2017 signed one-year deal with FC Rukh Vynnyky.

== Career ==
Vasyl Bilyi started playing for FC Lviv, for which he played 13 matches without goals.

In 2010 he moved to Stryi to the local FC Skala where he played 3 seasons, had 45 matches and scored 3 goals.

In the 2012-2013 season he moved to the second league Unity from the village of Plysky in which he scored 3 goals in 15 matches.

In the winter season of 2012-2013, the coach of Ternopil's Niva, Igor Yavorskyi, liked the game of Bilyi and he transferred to the Ternopil team for an open transfer window, for which he played 23 matches.

In June 2016, he became a Veres player.

In June 2017, he joined Rukh from Vynnyk, signing a one-year contract.

At the end of August 2018, he and his brother left Rukh as a free agent.

On September 2, 2018, he became a player of Lviv again, signing a one-year contract.

== Family ==
His older brother Ivan Bilyi is also a professional football player.
