= Oleh Matushevskyi =

Ukrainian footballer

Personal information
- Full name: Oleh Ivanovych Matushevskyi
- Date of birth: 19 February 1995 (age 31)
- Place of birth: Lviv, Ukraine
- Height: 1.82 m (6 ft 0 in)
- Position: Centre-back

Youth career
- 2008–2012: Karpaty Lviv
- 2012: Pogoń Lwów

Senior career*
Years	Team	Apps	(Gls)
2013–2015	Chornomorets Odesa	0	(0)
2015	Pogoń Lwów	6	(0)
2016	Sambir	11	(0)
2016–2018	Lviv	42	(0)
2018–2020	Kalush	42	(0)
2020	Nyva Terebovlya	6	(2)
2020–2021	Karpaty Halych	22	(1)
2021–2024	Prykarpattia Ivano-Frankivsk	41	(1)
- * Club domestic league appearances and goals as of 21 March 2024

Oleh Ivanovych Matushevskyi (Ukrainian: Олег Іванович Матушевський; born 19 February 1995) is a Ukrainian professional footballer who plays as a centre-back.
