= Rafael Sabino =

Brazilian footballer

Personal information
- Full name: Rafael Sabino dos Santos
- Date of birth: 17 June 1996 (age 30)
- Place of birth: São Paulo, Brazil
- Height: 1.76 m (5 ft 9 in)
- Position: Midfielder

Team information
- Current team: Khorazm
- Number: 96

Youth career
- –2015: Grêmio Barueri

Senior career*
Years	Team	Apps	(Gls)
2014–2016	Grêmio Barueri	17	(0)
2017	Grêmio Catanduvense	9	(0)
2018	Jaguariúna	6	(0)
2018–2021	Lviv	65	(2)
2022–2023	Akzhayik	24	(0)
2023–2025	Kyzylzhar	42	(3)
2026–	Khorazm	10	(0)
- * Club domestic league appearances and goals as of 29 July 2025

Rafael Sabino dos Santos (born 17 June 1996), known as Rafael Sabino or just Sabino, is a Brazilian footballer who plays as a midfielder for Uzbekistan Super League club Khorazm.

== Club career ==
He made his Ukrainian Premier League debut for FC Lviv on 22 July 2018 in a game against FC Arsenal Kyiv.
