= Jonatan Lima =

Brazilian footballer

Personal information
- Full name: Jonatan da Silva Lima
- Date of birth: 4 January 1992 (age 34)
- Place of birth: Salvador, Brazil
- Height: 1.83 m (6 ft 0 in)
- Position: Midfielder

Team information
- Current team: Kifisia
- Number: 30

Youth career
- 2009–2010: Corinthians

Senior career*
Years	Team	Apps	(Gls)
2011	Flamengo SP	18	(2)
2012	Guaratinguetá	28	(0)
2013–2014	Inter B		
2013	→ Caxias (loan)	13	(1)
2014	Icasa		
2015–2017	Ituano	16	(0)
2017	→ Veranópolis (loan)	12	(0)
2017	→ Portuguesa (loan)	2	(0)
2017	→ Criciúma (loan)	14	(0)
2017–2018	Novorizontino	4	(0)
2018–2020	Lviv	22	(0)
2020	Kremin Kremenchuk	9	(0)
2021	Al-Mesaimeer	0	(0)
2021–	Kifisia	0	(0)
- * Club domestic league appearances and goals as of 11 January 2021

Jonatan da Silva Lima (born 4 January 1992) is a Brazilian professional footballer who plays for Greek Super League 2 club Kifisia.

== Club career ==
He made his Campeonato Paulista debut for Guaratinguetá on 23 February 2012 in a game against Catanduvense.
