= Oleh Mozil =

Ukrainian footballer

Personal information
- Full name: Oleh Yuriyovych Mozil
- Date of birth: 7 April 1996 (age 30)
- Place of birth: Lviv, Ukraine
- Height: 1.82 m (6 ft 0 in)
- Position: Goalkeeper

Team information
- Current team: Metalist 1925 Kharkiv
- Number: 1

Youth career
- 2009–2013: Karpaty Lviv

Senior career*
Years	Team	Apps	(Gls)
2013–2018	Karpaty Lviv	2	(0)
2017	→ Bukovyna Chernivtsi (loan)	15	(0)
2018	→ Lviv (loan)	7	(0)
2018–2019	Polissya Zhytomyr	33	(0)
2020–2022	Ahrobiznes Volochysk	55	(0)
2022–	Metalist 1925 Kharkiv	51	(0)

International career^{‡}
2013–2014	Ukraine U18	4	(0)
2014–2015	Ukraine U19	6	(0)
- * Club domestic league appearances and goals as of 10 June 2025 ‡ National team caps and goals as of 30 March 2018

Oleh Yuriyovych Mozil (Ukrainian: Олег Юрійович Мозіль; born 7 April 1996) is a Ukrainian professional footballer who plays as a goalkeeper for Metalist 1925 Kharkiv in the Ukrainian First League.

== Career ==
=== Early years ===
Mozil is a product of Karpaty Lviv academy.

=== Karpaty Lviv ===
Starting in summer 2013, after graduating from the academy, he played for the Karpaty Lviv reserves. Mozil never made the debut for the senior team, and in March 2017 went on a half-year loan to Bukovyna Chernivtsi in the Ukrainian First League.
