= 2018–19 FC Olimpik Donetsk season =

Olimpik Donetsk
2018-19 season
- President: Vladyslav Helzin
- Manager: Roman Sanzhar (until 3 October 2018); Vyacheslav Shevchuk (since 3 October 2018 until 17 April 2019); Ihor Klymovskyi (since 17 April 2019)
- Stadium: Dynamo Stadium, Kyiv
- Ukrainian Premier League: 9th
- Ukrainian Cup: Round of 16 (1/8)
- Top goalscorer: League: Maksym Dehtyarov (8); All: Maksym Dehtyarov (8)
Home colours	Away colours

The 2018–19 season was fifth consecutive season in the top Ukrainian football league for Olimpik Donetsk. Olimpik competed in Premier League, Ukrainian Cup.

== Players ==
=== Squad information ===
As of 31 May 2019

Squad no.	Name	Nationality	Position	Date of birth (age)
Goalkeepers
1	Volodymyr Krynskyi	(Ukraine)	GK	14 January 1997 (aged 22)
12	Betim Halimi	(Kosovo) (Albania)	GK	28 February 1996 (aged 23)
37	Kostyantyn Makhnovskyi (on loan from Desna Chernihiv)	(Ukraine)	GK	1 January 1989 (aged 30)
71	Dani Junior Ltayf ^{List B}	(Ukraine)	GK	1 May 2000 (aged 19)
Defenders
4	Dmytro Hryshko (Captain)	(Ukraine)	DF	2 December 1985 (aged 33)
5	Illia Tymoshenko ^{List B}	(Ukraine)	DF	7 March 1999 (aged 20)
20	Darlington Igwekali ^{List B}	(Nigeria)	DF	4 April 2000 (aged 19)
24	David Enogela ^{List B}	(Nigeria)	DF	4 February 1998 (aged 21)
47	Roman Vantukh (on loan from Dynamo Kyiv)	(Ukraine)	DF	4 July 1998 (aged 20)
74	Ihor Snurnitsyn ^{List B}	(Ukraine)	DF	7 March 2000 (aged 19)
97	Yehor Klymenchuk	(Ukraine)	DF	11 November 1997 (aged 21)
Midfielders
7	Ivan Sondey	(Ukraine)	MF	15 January 1994 (aged 25)
8	Serhiy Politylo	(Ukraine)	MF	29 January 1989 (aged 30)
9	Oleksiy Gai	(Ukraine)	MF	6 November 1982 (aged 36)
13	Vitaliy Koltsov	(Ukraine)	MF	20 March 1994 (aged 25)
17	Vitaliy Balashov	(Ukraine)	MF	15 January 1991 (aged 28)
33	Andriy Kravchuk ^{List B}	(Ukraine)	MF	26 February 1999 (aged 20)
41	Hennadiy Pasich	(Ukraine)	MF	13 July 1993 (aged 25)
42	Yevhen Pasich	(Ukraine)	MF	13 July 1993 (aged 25)
44	Yevhen Tsymbalyuk	(Ukraine)	MF	19 June 1996 (aged 22)
63	Maxime Do Couto	(France)	MF	13 December 1996 (aged 22)
78	Pavlo Ksyonz	(Ukraine)	MF	2 January 1987 (aged 32)
88	Rinar Valeyev	(Ukraine)	MF	22 August 1987 (aged 31)
	Artem Tyshchenko ^{List B}	(Ukraine)	MF	16 March 2000 (aged 19)
Forwards
25	Matar Dieye	(Senegal)	FW	10 January 1998 (aged 21)
77	Maksym Dehtyarov	(Ukraine)	FW	30 May 1993 (aged 26)

== Transfers ==
=== In ===
Date	Pos.	Player	Age	Moving from	Type	Fee	Source
Summer
30 June 2018	DF	(Ukraine) Dmytro Hryshko	32	(Russia) SKA-Khabarovsk	Transfer	Free	
2 July 2018	GK	(Ukraine) Volodymyr Krynskyi	21	(Ukraine) FC Poltava	Transfer	Free	
2 July 2018	GK	(Ukraine) Roman Mysak	26	(Ukraine) Karpaty Lviv	Transfer	Free	
4 July 2018	DF	(Ukraine) Yevhen Zubeyko	28	(Ukraine) Chornomorets Odesa	Transfer	Undisclosed	
4 July 2018	DF	(Ukraine) Artur Zahorulko	25	(Ukraine) Shakhtar Donetsk	Transfer	Undisclosed	
9 July 2018	MF	(Ukraine) Yevhen Morozenko	26	(Ukraine) Veres Rivne	Transfer	Undisclosed	
10 July 2018	MF	(Ukraine) Vitaliy Koltsov	24	(Ukraine) FC Oleksandriya	Transfer	Undisclosed	
10 July 2018	MF	(Ukraine) Pavlo Ksyonz	31	(Poland) Sandecja Nowy Sącz	Transfer	Free	
17 July 2018	DF	(Ukraine) Serhiy Melinyshyn	21	(Ukraine) Volyn Lutsk	Transfer	Undisclosed	
17 July 2018	MF	(Ukraine) Yevhen Troyanovskyi	25	(Ukraine) FC Poltava	Transfer	Free	
17 July 2018	FW	(Ukraine) Maksym Dehtyarov	25	(Ukraine) FC Poltava	Transfer	Free	
25 July 2018	MF	(France) Maxime Do Couto	21	(France) Avoine OCC	Transfer	Undisclosed	
26 July 2018	DF	(Ukraine) Anton Kravchenko	27	(Turkey) Karabükspor	Transfer	Undisclosed	
4 September 2018	DF	(Nigeria) David Enogela	20	(Nigeria) Young Stars	Transfer	Free	
11 September 2018	MF	(Ukraine) Serhiy Politylo	29	(Turkey) Adana Demirspor	Transfer	Free	
12 October 2018	MF	(Ukraine) Oleksiy Gai	35	Unattached	Transfer	Free	
27 October 2018	MF	(Ukraine) Anton Shynder	31	(Hungary) Kisvárda	Transfer	Free	
31 May 2018	GK	(Ukraine) Yaroslav Kotlyarov	20	(Ukraine) Sudnobudivnyk Mykolaiv	Loan return		
31 May 2018	MF	(Ukraine) Stanislav Sharay	21	(Ukraine) Avanhard Kramatorsk	Loan return		
31 May 2018	MF	(Ukraine) Vladyslav Sharay	21	(Ukraine) Avanhard Kramatorsk	Loan return		
3 September 2018	MF	(Ukraine) Vladyslav Apostoliuk	20	(Denmark) Fremad Amager	Loan return		
17 July 2018	GK	(Ukraine) Kostyantyn Makhnovskyi	29	(Ukraine) Desna Chernihiv	Loan		
29 August 2018	MF	(Ukraine) Dmytro Bilonoh	23	(Ukraine) Zirka Kropyvnytskyi	Loan		
Winter
16 January 2019	DF	(Ukraine) Yehor Klymenchuk	21	Unattached	Transfer	Free	
17 January 2019	DF	(Senegal) Matar Dieye	21	(Italy) Este	Transfer	Undisclosed	
22 February 2019	GK	(Kosovo) Betim Halimi	22	(Estonia) Narva Trans	Transfer	Undisclosed	
19 March 2019	DF	(Nigeria) Darlington Igwekali	18	(Turkey) Alanyaspor	Transfer	Undisclosed	
28 March 2019	MF	(Ukraine) Rinar Valeyev	31	(Georgia (country)) Shevardeni-1906 Tbilisi	Transfer	Free	
1 January 2019	DF	(Ukraine) Artem Kozlov	21	(Ukraine) PFC Sumy	Loan return		
1 January 2019	MF	(Ukraine) Stanislav Sharay	21	(Ukraine) PFC Sumy	Loan return		
1 January 2019	MF	(Ukraine) Vladyslav Sharay	21	(Ukraine) PFC Sumy	Loan return		
19 February 2019	DF	(Ukraine) Roman Vantukh	20	(Ukraine) Dynamo Kyiv	Loan		

=== Out ===
Date	Pos.	Player	Age	Moving to	Type	Fee	Source
Summer
25 May 2018	GK	(Georgia (country)) Zauri Makharadze	25	(Ukraine) Zorya Luhansk	Transfer	Free	
31 May 2018	FW	(Ukraine) Vladyslav Helzin	44	Retired	Transfer	Free	
6 June 2018	MF	(Ukraine) Artem Schedryi	22	(Ukraine) SC Dnipro-1	Transfer	Free	
12 June 2018	DF	(Republic of the Congo) Vladis-Emmerson Illoy-Ayyet	22	(Denmark) Vejle Boldklub	Transfer	Undisclosed	
13 June 2018	DF	(Ukraine) Andriy Mischenko	27	Unattached	Transfer	Free	
13 June 2018	MF	(Ukraine) Ivan Brikner	24	(Ukraine) Rukh Vynnyky	Transfer	Free	
14 June 2018	GK	(Ukraine) Artem Kychak	29	(Hungary) MTK Budapest	Transfer	Free	
22 June 2018	MF	(Croatia) Josip Vuković	26	(Portugal) Marítimo	Transfer	Free	
25 June 2018	MF	(Ukraine) Ruslan Kisil	26	(Ukraine) Desna Chernihiv	Transfer	Free	
July 2018	GK	(Ukraine) Roman Mysak	26	Unattached	Transfer	Free	
9 July 2018	MF	(Brazil) Leônidas	22	Unattached	Transfer	Free	
19 July 2018	DF	(Ukraine) Nazar Yedynak	20	(Poland) Ruch Wysokie Mazowieckie	Transfer	Free	
20 June 2018	MF	(Ukraine) Volodymyr Doronin	25	(Ukraine) Arsenal Kyiv	Transfer	Free	
13 July 2018	MF	(Ukraine) Vladyslav Khomutov	20	(Ukraine) Chornomorets Odesa	Transfer	Free	
20 July 2018	GK	(Ukraine) Yaroslav Kotlyarov	20	(Ukraine) Kremin Kremenchuk	Transfer	Free	
10 August 2018	DF	(Ukraine) Serhiy Kulynych	23	(Serbia) Spartak Subotica	Transfer	Free	
12 August 2018	FW	(Ukraine) Yuriy Zakharkiv	22	(Lithuania) Atlantas Klaipėda	Transfer	Free	
17 August 2018	FW	(Ukraine) Stanislav Bilenkyi	19	(Slovakia) Dunajská Streda	Transfer	Undisclosed	
30 August 2018	DF	(Georgia (country)) Luka Nadiradze	20	(Ukraine) PFC Sumy	Transfer	Free	
30 August 2018	MF	(Ukraine) Yevhen Morozenko	26	Unattached	Transfer	Free	
31 August 2018	FW	(Ukraine) Artur Zahorulko	25	(Ukraine) Rukh Vynnyky	Transfer	Free	
8 September 2018	DF	(Ukraine) Vadym Schastlyvtsev	20	(Ukraine) Avanhard Kramatorsk	Transfer	Free	
31 May 2018	DF	(Ukraine) Zurab Ochigava	23	(Ukraine) Dynamo Kyiv	Loan return		
19 July 2018	DF	(Ukraine) Artem Kozlov	21	(Ukraine) PFC Sumy	Loan		
19 July 2018	MF	(Ukraine) Stanislav Sharay	21	(Ukraine) PFC Sumy	Loan		
19 July 2018	MF	(Ukraine) Vladyslav Sharay	21	(Ukraine) PFC Sumy	Loan		
27 July 2018	MF	(Ukraine) Vladyslav Apostoliuk	20	(Denmark) Fremad Amager	Loan		
Winter
1 January 2019	DF	(Ukraine) Artem Kozlov	21	Disqualified	Transfer	Free	
1 January 2019	DF	(Ukraine) Serhiy Melinyshyn	21	Unattached	Transfer	Free	
25 January 2019	GK	(Ukraine) Bohdan Bezkrovnyi	20	Unattached	Transfer	Free	
26 January 2019	DF	(Ukraine) Anton Kravchenko	27	(Hungary) Kisvárda	Transfer	Free	
3 February 2019	DF	(Ukraine) Yevhen Zubeyko	27	(Georgia (country)) Dinamo Batumi	Transfer	Free	
2 March 2019	MF	(Ukraine) Yevhen Troyanovskyi	25	(Ukraine) Avanhard Kramatorsk	Transfer	Free	
29 March 2019	FW	(Ukraine) Anton Shynder	31	Unattached	Transfer	Free	
31 December 2018	DF	(Ukraine) Dmytro Nyemchaninov	28	(Russia) Krylia Sovetov Samara	Loan return		
31 December 2018	DF	(Ukraine) Serhiy Vakulenko	25	(Ukraine) Shakhtar Donetsk	Loan return		
31 December 2018	MF	(Ukraine) Dmytro Bilonoh	23	(Ukraine) Zirka Kropyvnytskyi	Loan return		

== Pre-season and friendlies ==
24 June 2018 Friendly	Obolon-Brovar Kyiv (Ukraine)	1–0	(Ukraine) Olimpik Donetsk	Kyiv
11:00 EEST (UTC+03:00)	Ulianchenko 44' (pen.)	Report		Stadium: Obolon Arena; Attendance: 100

27 June 2018 Friendly	Olimpik Donetsk (Ukraine)	3–1	(Ukraine) PFC Sumy	Mala Soltanivka
17:00 EEST (UTC+03:00)	Goal	Report	Goal	Stadium: Saltik Stadium; Attendance: 100

28 June 2018 Friendly	Desna Chernihiv (Ukraine)	0–1	(Ukraine) Olimpik Donetsk	Chernihiv
16:00 EEST (UTC+03:00)		Report	Goal	Stadium: Chernihiv Stadium; Attendance: 1,000

29 June 2018 Friendly	Kolos Kovalivka (Ukraine)	2–1	(Ukraine) Olimpik Donetsk	Kovalivka
17:00 EEST (UTC+03:00)	Lysenko 49'; Pozdyeyev 88' (pen.)	Report	Karnoza 66' (pen.)	Stadium: Kolos Stadium; Attendance: 100; Referee: Mykola Balakin

7 July 2018 Friendly	Hirnyk-Sport Horishni Plavni (Ukraine)	2–2	(Ukraine) Olimpik Donetsk	Poltava
17:00 EEST (UTC+03:00)	Batyushyn 43', 76'	Report	Balashov 13'; Teixeira 89'	Stadium: Ltava Stadium; Attendance: 50

11 July 2018 Friendly	Olimpik Donetsk (Ukraine)	3–0	(Ukraine) SC Dnipro-1	Vysokyi
16:00 EEST (UTC+03:00)	Hennadiy Pasich 15'; Nyemchaninov 57'; Balashov 76'	Report		Stadium: Vysokyi train base Attendance: 50

13 July 2018 Friendly	Metalist 1925 Kharkiv (Ukraine)	0–2	(Ukraine) Olimpik Donetsk	Vysokyi
11:00 EEST (UTC+03:00)		Report	Balashov 39'; Vakulenko 88'	Stadium: Vysokyi train base Attendance: 50

8 September 2018 Friendly	Olimpik Donetsk (Ukraine)	1–1	(Ukraine) FC Vovchansk	Vysokyi
17:00 EEST (UTC+03:00)	Troyanovskyi 43'	Report	Solomakha 72'	Stadium: Vysokyi train base

14 October 2018 Friendly	Olimpik Donetsk (Ukraine)	0–1	(Georgia (country)) Kolkheti-1913 Poti	Bucha
14:30 EEST (UTC+03:00)		Report	Imnadze	Stadium: Yuvileiny Stadium; Attendance: 50

15 October 2018 Friendly	Obolon-Brovar Kyiv (Ukraine)	0–2	(Ukraine) Olimpik Donetsk	Bucha
12:00 EEST (UTC+03:00)		Report	Balashov 53' (pen.), 88' (pen.)	Stadium: Obolon train base Attendance: 50

18 November 2018 Friendly	Dynamo Kyiv (Ukraine)	3–0	(Ukraine) Olimpik Donetsk	Kyiv
13:00 EET (UTC+02:00)	Bueno 27'; Khotsyanovskyi 83'; Harmash 90'	Report		Stadium: Dynamo Training Center; Attendance: 50; Referee: Volodymyr Novokhatniy

22 January 2019 Friendly	Olimpik Donetsk (Ukraine)	3–1	(Kazakhstan) Kaysar Kyzylorda	Antalya, Turkey
14:00 EEST (UTC+03:00)	Dehtyarov 13'; Sondey 25'; Shynder 58'	Report	Tagybergen 21' (pen.)	Stadium: Titanic sport complex Attendance: 50

25 January 2019 Friendly	Olimpik Donetsk (Ukraine)	0–1	(Hungary) Honvéd Budapest	Antalya, Turkey
14:00 EEST (UTC+03:00)		Report	Holender 79'	Stadium: Titanic sport complex Attendance: 50

28 January 2019 Friendly	Olimpik Donetsk (Ukraine)	3–1	(North Macedonia) Rabotnički Skopje	Antalya, Turkey
14:00 EEST (UTC+03:00)	Dieye 20'; Shynder 76'; Balashov 80'	Report	55'	Stadium: Miracle sport complex Attendance: 50

31 January 2019 Friendly	Olimpik Donetsk (Ukraine)	2–1	(Kosovo) FC Prishtina	Antalya, Turkey
14:00 EEST (UTC+03:00)	Shynder 40' (pen.); Dehtyarov 47'	Report	84'	Stadium: Titanic sport complex Attendance: 50

7 February 2019 Friendly	Sheriff Tiraspol (Moldova)	1–2	(Ukraine) Olimpik Donetsk	Antalya, Turkey
17:00 EEST (UTC+03:00)	Jach 40'	Report	Gai 16' (pen.); Balashov 88'	Stadium: Susesi sport complex Attendance: 50

10 February 2019 Friendly	Olimpija Ljubljana (Slovenia)	0–0	(Ukraine) Olimpik Donetsk	Turkey
16:30 EEST (UTC+03:00)		Report		Attendance: 50

11 February 2019 Friendly	SC Dnipro-1 (Ukraine)	0–1	(Ukraine) Olimpik Donetsk	Side, Turkey
15:30 EEST (UTC+03:00)		Report	Gai 74' (pen.)	Stadium: Side Sport sport complex Attendance: 50

14 February 2019 Friendly	Torpedo Kutaisi (Georgia (country))	2–2	(Ukraine) Olimpik Donetsk	Antalya, Turkey
14:00 EEST (UTC+03:00)	Kavtaradze 34'; Zivzivadze 40'	Report	Do Couto 25'; Koltsov 84'	Stadium: Titanic sport complex Attendance: 50

15 February 2019 Friendly	Tobol (Kazakhstan)	0–4	(Ukraine) Olimpik Donetsk	Belek, Turkey
14:30 EEST (UTC+03:00)		Report	Gai 35' (pen.); Dieye 50', 60'; Dehtyarov 84'	Stadium: Susesi sport complex Attendance: 50

27 March 2019 Friendly	Shakhtar Donetsk (Ukraine)	4–0	(Ukraine) Olimpik Donetsk	Kyiv
11:00 EEST (UTC+03:00)	Totovytskyi 45'; Nem 57'; Tetê 74'; Marcos Antônio 90+1'	Report		Stadium: Svyatoshin olympic complex Attendance: 50

== Competitions ==
=== Overall ===
Competition	First match	Last match	Starting round	Final position	Record							
Competition	First match	Last match	Starting round	Final position	Pld	W	D	L	GF	GA	GD	Win %
Premier League	23 July 2018		Matchday 1		32	7	13	12	41	48	−7	21.88
Cup	26 September 2018	31 October 2018	Round of 32 (1/16)	Round of 16 (1/8)	2	0	1	1	3	4	−1	0.00
Total					34	7	14	13	44	52	−8	20.59

Last updated: 31 May 2019
Source: Competitions

=== Premier League ===
==== League table ====
Pos	Team	Pld	W	D	L	GF	GA	GD	Pts	Qualification or relegation
7	Vorskla Poltava	32	12	6	14	31	43	−12	42	
8	Desna Chernihiv	32	12	5	15	35	41	−6	41	
9	Olimpik Donetsk	32	7	13	12	41	48	−7	34	
10	Karpaty Lviv (O)	32	8	9	15	44	53	−9	33	Qualification for the Relegation play-offs
11	Chornomorets Odesa (R)	32	8	7	17	31	49	−18	31	Qualification for the Relegation play-offs

Source: Ukrainian Premier League (in Ukrainian), UEFA, Soccerway
Rules for classification: 1) Points; 2) Head-to-head points; 3) Head-to-head goal difference; 4) Head-to-head higher number of goals scored; 5) Goal difference; 6) Higher number of goals scored; 7) Draw or "golden match" if tied for title (Article 22, paragraph 3).
(O) Play-off winners; (R) Relegated

Teams that placed 10th and 11th in the 2018–19 Ukrainian Premier League play two-leg play-off with the second and third teams of the 2018–19 Ukrainian First League. The draw for play-offs took place on 24 May 2019 and the games will be played on 4 and 8 June 2019.

Team 1	Agg.	Team 2	1st leg	2nd leg
Chornomorets Odesa	0 – 2	Kolos Kovalivka	0 – 0	0 – 2
Karpaty Lviv	3 – 1	Volyn Lutsk	0 – 0	3 – 1

=== First leg ===
4 June 2019
19:00 UTC+3

Chornomorets Odesa	0 – 0	Kolos Kovalivka
	Report

Chornomorets Stadium, Odesa
Attendance: 5,435
Referee: Anatoliy Abdula (Kharkiv)

4 June 2019
19:00 UTC+3

Karpaty Lviv	0 – 0	Volyn Lutsk
	Report

Ukraina Stadium, Lviv
Attendance: 10,104
Referee: Denys Shurman (Vyshneve)

=== Second leg ===
8 June 2019
17:00 UTC+3

Kolos Kovalivka	2 – 0	Chornomorets Odesa
Havrysh 57', 63' (pen.)	Report

Kolos Stadium, Kovalivka
Attendance: 2,500
Referee: Vitaliy Romanov

Kolos Kovalivka won 2–0 on aggregate and were promoted to the 2019–20 Ukrainian Premier League. Chornomorets Odesa were relegated to the 2019–20 Ukrainian First League

8 June 2019
19:00 UTC+3

Volyn Lutsk	0 – 3 ~~1 – 3~~	Karpaty Lviv
Kozhanov 42'	Report	Klyots 37'; Ponde 82' (pen.); Miroshnichenko 90+5'

Avanhard Stadium, Lutsk
Attendance: 5,200
Referee: Maksym Kozyryatskyi

Karpaty Lviv won 3–0 on aggregate and retained their spot in the 2019–20 Ukrainian Premier League. Volyn Lutsk remained in the 2019–20 Ukrainian First League

Due to fan violence at the game and attack on referee, the original score 1–3 was scratched and replaced with technical score 0–3 loss to Volyn and win for Karpaty. Additionally, the Lutsk department of police started criminal proceedings on the fact of intentional damage to property during the game by the Karpaty fans.

==== Results summary ====
Overall								Home						Away					
Pld	W	D	L	GF	GA	GD	Pts	W	D	L	GF	GA	GD	W	D	L	GF	GA	GD
32	7	13	12	41	48	−7	34	5	4	7	20	25	−5	2	9	5	21	23	−2

Last updated: 31 May 2019.
Source: Competitive matches

==== Results by round ====
Round	1	2	3	4	5	6	7	8	9	10	11	12	13	14	15	16	17	18	19	20	21	22	23	24	25	26	27	28	29	30	31	32
Ground	A	H	A	H	A	H	A	H	A	H	A	H	A	H	A	H	A	H	A	H	A	H	H	A	H	H	H	A	H	A	A	A
Result	L	W	D	D	D	L	W	L	W	L	L	W	L	L	D	D	D	D	L	L	D	L	L	D	W	W	D	L	W	D	D	D
Position	8	8	7	6	6	7	6	9	6	7	8	9	9	10	10	9	9	9	10	10	10	10	10	10	10	9	9	9	9	9	9	9

Updated to match(es) played on 31 May 2019. Source: Competitive matches
A = Away; H = Home; W = Win; D = Draw; L = Loss

==== Matches ====
23 July 2018 1	Chornomorets Odesa	2–1	Olimpik Donetsk	Odesa
19:00 EEST (UTC+03:00)	Ryzhuk 9'; Smirnov (yellow card) 22'; Leonov (yellow card) 55'; Tatarkov 66'; Yarmolenko (yellow card) 83'	Report	Vakulenko (yellow card) 18'; Melinyshyn (yellow card) 67'; Dehtyarov 70'	Stadium: Chornomorets Odesa; Attendance: 4,364; Referee: Mykola Kryvonosov

29 July 2018 2	Olimpik Donetsk	1–0	Vorskla Poltava	Kyiv
17:00 EEST (UTC+03:00)	Balashov 51'; Hennadiy Pasich (yellow card) 86'	Report	Dallku (yellow card) 14'; Mysyk (yellow card) 73'	Stadium: Dynamo Stadium; Attendance: 550; Referee: Ihor Paskhal

5 August 2018 3	Karpaty Lviv	2–2	Olimpik Donetsk	Lviv
17:00 EEST (UTC+03:00)	Lebedenko (yellow card) 19'; Di Franco 32', (yellow card) 71'; Shved 36'; Boroday (yellow card) 78'	Report	Kravchenko 58'; Yevhen Pasich (yellow card) 68'; Troyanovskyi (yellow card) 81'; Do Couto 86'	Stadium: Ukraina Stadium; Attendance: 3,000; Referee: Volodymyr Novokhatniy

10 August 2018 4	Olimpik Donetsk	1–1	FC Lviv	Kyiv
19:00 EEST (UTC+03:00)	Hryshko (yellow card) 61'; Zubeyko (yellow card) 77'; Troyanovskyi (yellow card) 81'; Yevhen Pasich 86'	Report	Pryimak (yellow card) 32' (yellow-red card) 39'; Adamyuk 69'	Stadium: Dynamo Stadium; Attendance: 1,000; Referee: Anatoliy Abdula

18 August 2018 5	Zorya Luhansk	0–0	Olimpik Donetsk	Zaporizhia
19:30 EEST (UTC+03:00)	Hordiyenko (yellow card) 22'; Kharatin (yellow card) 89'	Report		Stadium: Slavutych-Arena; Attendance: 3,498; Referee: Oleksandr Derdo

24 August 2018 6	Olimpik Donetsk	2–5	Shakhtar Donetsk	Kyiv
19:00 EEST (UTC+03:00)	Hennadiy Pasich 19', (yellow card) 70'; Morozenko (yellow card) 57'; Danchenko 76' (o.g.)	Report	Marlos 11'; Moraes 17', 33', 74'; Wellington Nem (yellow card) 25'; Stepanenko 42'; Danchenko (yellow card) 80'; Fernando (yellow card) 84'	Stadium: Dynamo Stadium; Attendance: 4,230; Referee: Dmytro Kutakov

2 September 2018 7	Desna Chernihiv	0–1	Olimpik Donetsk	Chernihiv
14:00 EEST (UTC+03:00)	Ohirya (yellow card) 45'; Hitchenko (yellow card) 55' (yellow-red card) 76'; Filippov (yellow card) 60'	Report	Yevhen Pasich (yellow card) 39'; Bilonoh 54'; Dehtyarov (yellow card) 56'	Stadium: Chernihiv Stadium; Attendance: 3,567; Referee: Vitaliy Romanov

16 September 2018 8	Olimpik Donetsk	1–3	FC Mariupol	Kyiv
14:00 EEST (UTC+03:00)	Vakulenko 26' (pen.), (yellow card) 86'	Report	Fedorchuk 9', 89', (yellow card) 64'; Zubkov (yellow card) 12'; Bykov (yellow card) 35'; Ihnatenko (yellow card) 59'; Polehenko (yellow card) 66'; Fomin 80'	Stadium: Dynamo Stadium; Attendance: 1,000; Referee: Yuriy Mozharovskyi

22 September 2018 9	Arsenal Kyiv	1–3	Olimpik Donetsk	Kyiv
19:30 EEST (UTC+03:00)	Piris (yellow card) 20'; Dubinchak (yellow card) 45+1'; Hryn 59', (yellow card) 89'; Maydanevych (yellow card) 80'	Report	Vakulenko 16'; Zubeyko (yellow card) 28'; Dehtyarov (yellow card) 53', (goal) 82'; Hryshko 64'	Stadium: Dynamo Stadium; Attendance: 820; Referee: Maksym Bondarenko

29 September 2018 10	Olimpik Donetsk	2–3	FC Oleksandriya	Kyiv
14:00 EEST (UTC+03:00)	Koltsov 11'; Politylo 29'; Zubeyko (yellow card) 72'; Snurnitsyn (yellow card) 87'	Report	Shastal 25', (yellow card) 52'; Stetskov (yellow card) 28'; Bondarenko (yellow card) 70'; Banada 74'; Hrytsuk 88' (pen.)	Stadium: Dynamo Stadium; Attendance: 191; Referee: Anatoliy Abdula

7 October 2018 11	Dynamo Kyiv	1–0	Olimpik Donetsk	Kyiv
17:00 EEST (UTC+03:00)	Morozyuk 30'; Burda (yellow card) 53'	Report	Do Couto (yellow card) 59'; Nyemchaninov (yellow card) 69'; Kravchenko (yellow card) 84'	Stadium: NSC Olimpiyskiy; Attendance: 9,650; Referee: Yaroslav Kozyk

21 October 2018 12	Olimpik Donetsk	1–0	Chornomorets Odesa	Kyiv
17:00 EEST (UTC+03:00)	Balashov (yellow card) 6'; Ksyonz (yellow card) 39'; Snurnitsyn (yellow card) 51'; Dehtyarov 70'; Kravchuk (yellow card) 90+3'	Report	Chorniy (yellow card) 20'; Trubochkin (yellow card) 49'	Stadium: Dynamo Stadium; Attendance: 800; Referee: Yuriy Mozharovskyi

28 October 2018 13	Vorskla Poltava	2–1	Olimpik Donetsk	Poltava
19:30 EET (UTC+02:00)	Dallku (yellow card) 16' (yellow-red card) 33'; Snurnitsyn 44' (o.g.); Sapay (yellow card) 51'; Kulach 68'	Report	Politylo 16' (pen.); Ksyonz (yellow card) 87'	Stadium: Vorskla Stadium; Attendance: 1,757; Referee: Kostiantyn Trukhanov

3 November 2018 14	Olimpik Donetsk	1–2	Karpaty Lviv	Kyiv
19:30 EET (UTC+02:00)	Politylo (yellow card) 22'; Vakulenko (yellow card) 29'; Shynder (yellow card) 52'; Makhnovskyi (yellow card) 74'; Yevhen Pasich 90+1'	Report	Ponde 5', (yellow card) 36'; Carrascal (yellow card) 23'; Kovtun (yellow card) 65'; Shved 73' (pen.); Shevchenko (yellow card) 87'; Erbes (yellow card) 90+1'	Stadium: Dynamo Stadium; Attendance: 1,050; Referee: Ihor Paskhal

10 November 2018 15	FC Lviv	1–1	Olimpik Donetsk	Lviv
14:00 EET (UTC+02:00)	Marthã (yellow card) 14'; Holikov (yellow card) 24'; Lucas Taylor 27'; Borzenko (yellow card) 43'; Julio Cesar (yellow card) 51'; Sabino (yellow card) 52'	Report	Politylo (yellow card) 39'; Shynder 63'; Kravchenko (yellow card) 76'; Balashov (yellow card) 90+2'	Stadium: Arena Lviv; Attendance: 1,003; Referee: Ievgenii Aranovskyi

25 November 2018 16	Olimpik Donetsk	1–1	Zorya Luhansk	Kyiv
14:00 EET (UTC+02:00)	Balashov 59' (pen.), (yellow card) 90+3'; Do Couto (yellow card) 84'; Dehtyarov (yellow card) 86'; Shynder (yellow card) 89'; Kravchenko (yellow card) 90+3'	Report	Vernydub 50'; Mykhaylychenko (yellow card) 56'	Stadium: Dynamo Stadium; Attendance: 338; Referee: Ivan Bondar

2 December 2018 17	Shakhtar Donetsk	2–2	Olimpik Donetsk	Kharkiv
17:00 EET (UTC+02:00)	Moraes 7', 90+3', (yellow card) 69'; Stepanenko (yellow card) 44'; Maycon (yellow card) 51'; Danchenko (yellow card) 65'; Taison (yellow card) 90+5'; Alan Patrick (yellow card) 90+5'	Report	Yevhen Pasich 52'; Koltsov (yellow card) 60'; Balashov 66'; Makhnovskyi (yellow card) 85'; Politylo (yellow card) 90+5'	Stadium: OSC Metalist; Attendance: 2,137; Referee: Viktor Kopiyevskyi

9 December 2018 18	Olimpik Donetsk	1–1	Desna Chernihiv	Kyiv
14:00 EET (UTC+02:00)	Yevhen Pasich 60'; Koltsov (yellow card) 90+3'	Report	Mostovyi (yellow card) 13'; Denys Favorov 63'	Stadium: Dynamo Stadium; Attendance: 330; Referee: Denys Shurman

23 February 2019 19	FC Mariupol	2–1	Olimpik Donetsk	Mariupol
14:00 EEST (UTC+03:00)	Fedorchuk (yellow card) 19'; Pikhalyonok 45+1' (pen.); Boryachuk 48' (pen.)	Report	Hennadiy Pasich 25'; Makhnovskyi (yellow card) 45+1'	Stadium: Volodymyr Boiko Stadium; Attendance: 1,214; Referee: Denys Shurman

3 March 2019 20	Olimpik Donetsk	0–1	Arsenal Kyiv	Kyiv
14:00 EET (UTC+02:00)	Tsymbalyuk (yellow card) 10'; Shynder (yellow card) 39'; Hennadiy Pasich (yellow card) 69'; Ksyonz (yellow card) 77'; Gai (yellow card) 85'; Dehtyarov (yellow card) 90+3'	Report	Vakulenko 10' (pen.), (yellow card) 12'; Bashlay (yellow card) 26' (yellow-red card) 35'	Stadium: Dynamo Stadium; Attendance: 420; Referee: Dmytro Kryvushkin

10 March 2019 21	FC Oleksandriya	1–1	Olimpik Donetsk	Oleksandriya
19:30 EET (UTC+02:00)	Dedechko (yellow card) 41'; Kovalets (yellow card) 54', (goal) 69'; Zaderaka (yellow card) 59'; Banada (yellow card) 80'; Polyarus (yellow card) 90+2'	Report	Do Couto (yellow card) 79' (yellow-red card) 83'; Dieye 88'	Stadium: CSC Nika Stadium; Attendance: 1,063; Referee: Serhiy Boyko

17 March 2019 22	Olimpik Donetsk	1–2	Dynamo Kyiv	Kyiv
19:30 EET (UTC+02:00)	Gai 27' (pen.); Dieye (yellow card) 59'	Report	Tsyhankov 14' (pen.); Rusyn (yellow card) 28', (goal) 39'; Burda (yellow card) 44'; Kádár (yellow card) 58'	Stadium: Dynamo Stadium; Attendance: 2,500; Referee: Ihor Paskhal

6 April 2019 23	Olimpik Donetsk	0–2	Desna Chernihiv	Kyiv
14:00 EEST (UTC+03:00)	Dieye (yellow card) 26'; Hryshko (yellow card) 87'	Report	Denys Favorov 20', (yellow card) 89'; Artem Favorov (yellow card) 54'; Starenkyi 70'	Stadium: Dynamo Stadium; Attendance: 1,470; Referee: Kostiantyn Trukhanov

14 April 2019 24	Chornomorets Odesa	1–1	Olimpik Donetsk	Odesa
19:30 EEST (UTC+03:00)	Vilhjálmsson (yellow card) 3'; Tanchyk 62'	Report	Dehtyarov 40'	Stadium: Chornomorets Odesa; Attendance: 2,850; Referee: Yevhen Aranovskyi

23 April 2019 25	Olimpik Donetsk	2–0	Arsenal Kyiv	Kyiv
17:00 EEST (UTC+03:00)	Gai 37' (pen.); Dehtyarov 44'	Report	Tankovskyi (yellow card) 19'; Dubinchak (yellow card) 58'	Stadium: Dynamo Stadium; Attendance: 258; Referee: Dmytro Kryvushkin

27 April 2019 26	Olimpik Donetsk	3–2	Karpaty Lviv	Kyiv
17:00 EEST (UTC+03:00)	Hennadiy Pasich 9'; Dehtyarov 83'; Dieye 84'; Valeyev (yellow card) 90'	Report	Sandokhadze (yellow card) 24'; Di Franco 36'; Nesterov (yellow card) 46'; Ponde 54'	Stadium: Dynamo Stadium; Attendance: 435; Referee: Denys Shurman

5 May 2019 27	Olimpik Donetsk	1–1	Vorskla Poltava	Kyiv
14:00 EEST (UTC+03:00)	Ksyonz (yellow card) 36'; Tsymbalyuk (yellow card) 50'; Valeyev (yellow card) 58'; Hennadiy Pasich 63', (yellow card) 67'	Report	Chesnakov 39'; Habelok (yellow card) 70'; Martynenko (red card) 86'; Rebenok (yellow card) 90+1'	Stadium: Dynamo Stadium; Attendance: 520; Referee: Dmytro Kutakov

12 May 2019 28	Desna Chernihiv	2–1	Olimpik Donetsk	Chernihiv
14:00 EEST (UTC+03:00)	Denys Favorov 15'; Filippov 48'; Artem Favorov (yellow card) 90+4'	Report	Kravchuk (yellow card) 31'; Dieye 51'; Hryshko (yellow card) 62'	Stadium: Chernihiv Stadium; Attendance: 2,496; Referee: Kostiantyn Trukhanov

18 May 2019 29	Olimpik Donetsk	2–1	Chornomorets Odesa	Kyiv
19:30 EEST (UTC+03:00)	Dieye 17'; Vantukh 49'	Report	Pavlov 47'; Norenkov (yellow card) 81' (yellow-red card) 90+3'; Koval (yellow card) 90'	Stadium: Dynamo Stadium; Attendance: 319; Referee: Ihor Paskhal

21 May 2019 30	Arsenal Kyiv	1–1	Olimpik Donetsk	Kyiv
19:30 EEST (UTC+03:00)	Tankovskyi 31'; Dubinchak (yellow card) 68'; Kalitvintsev (yellow card) 75'; Bashlay (yellow card) 86'	Report	Dieye 25'; Hennadiy Pasich (yellow card) 52' (yellow-red card) 54'; Klymenchuk (yellow card) 61'	Stadium: Dynamo Stadium; Attendance: 341; Referee: Yuriy Mozharovskyi

25 May 2019 31	Karpaty Lviv	3–3	Olimpik Donetsk	Lviv
17:00 EEST (UTC+03:00)	Hongla 15'; Myakushko 75', 77' (pen.); Ponde (yellow card) 85'	Report	Dieye 2', 89', (yellow card) 90'; Gai 83'	Stadium: Ukraina Stadium; Attendance: 1,425; Referee: Kostiantyn Trukhanov

29 May 2019 32	Vorskla Poltava	2–2	Olimpik Donetsk	Poltava
17:00 EEST (UTC+03:00)	Sharpar 5'; Vasin 44' (pen.); Sakiv (yellow card) 79'	Report	Klymenchuk (yellow card) 44'; Dehtyarov 75', 83'	Stadium: Vorskla Stadium; Attendance: 1,053; Referee: Anatoliy Abdula

=== Ukrainian Cup ===
26 September 2018 Round of 32	Zirka Kropyvnytskyi	1–1 (4 – 5 p)	Olimpik Donetsk	Kropyvnytskyi
17:00 EEST (UTC+03:00)	Vyzdryk (yellow card) 70'; Kondrakov 87' (pen.)	Report	Do Couto (yellow card) 70'; Politylo 87'; Hennadiy Pasich (yellow card) 70'; Koltsov (yellow card) 70'	Stadium: Zirka Stadium; Attendance: 500; Referee: Dmytro Panchyshyn
	Penalties
	Duhiyenko (penalty scored); Nerubenko (penalty scored); Kondrakov (penalty scored); Pisaryev (penalty scored); Safronov (penalty missed)		Politylo (penalty scored); Do Couto (penalty scored); Koltsov (penalty scored); Dehtyarov (penalty scored); Balashov (penalty scored)

31 October 2018 Round of 16 (1/8)	Shakhtar Donetsk	3–2	Olimpik Donetsk	Kharkiv
19:00 EET (UTC+02:00)	Khocholava (yellow card) 43'; Moraes 63' (pen.); Totovytskyi 66', 83'	Report	Hryshko (yellow card) 30' (yellow-red card) 61'; Bilonoh 55' (pen.); Koltsov (yellow card) 79'; Gai 81'	Stadium: OSC Metalist; Attendance: 2,000; Referee: Mykola Balakin

== Statistics ==
=== Appearances and goals ===
No.	Pos	Nat	Player	Total		Premier League		Cup	
No.	Pos	Nat	Player	Apps	Goals	Apps	Goals	Apps	Goals
Goalkeepers
1	GK	(Ukraine) UKR	Volodymyr Krynskyi	18	0	17	0	1	0
12	GK	(Kosovo) KOS	Betim Halimi	4	0	4	0	0	0
37	GK	(Ukraine) UKR	Kostyantyn Makhnovskyi	12	0	11	0	1	0
Defenders
4	DF	(Ukraine) UKR	Dmytro Hryshko	28	1	27	1	1	0
47	DF	(Ukraine) UKR	Roman Vantukh	12	1	11+1	1	0	0
74	DF	(Ukraine) UKR	Ihor Snurnitsyn	15	0	12+2	0	1	0
97	DF	(Ukraine) UKR	Yehor Klymenchuk	5	0	5	0	0	0
Midfielders
7	MF	(Ukraine) UKR	Ivan Sondey	19	0	8+11	0	0	0
8	MF	(Ukraine) UKR	Serhiy Politylo	23	3	20+1	2	2	1
9	MF	(Ukraine) UKR	Oleksiy Gai	22	4	21	3	1	1
13	MF	(Ukraine) UKR	Vitaliy Koltsov	23	1	18+3	1	1+1	0
17	MF	(Ukraine) UKR	Vitaliy Balashov	24	3	17+5	3	0+2	0
33	MF	(Ukraine) UKR	Andriy Kravchuk	8	0	5+3	0	0	0
41	MF	(Ukraine) UKR	Hennadiy Pasich	20	4	13+6	4	1	0
42	MF	(Ukraine) UKR	Yevhen Pasich	26	4	16+8	4	1+1	0
44	MF	(Ukraine) UKR	Yevhen Tsymbalyuk	20	0	15+3	0	2	0
63	MF	(France) FRA	Maxime Do Couto	27	1	17+8	1	1+1	0
78	MF	(Ukraine) UKR	Pavlo Ksyonz	32	0	30	0	2	0
88	MF	(Ukraine) UKR	Rinar Valeyev	9	0	2+7	0	0	0
Forwards
25	FW	(Senegal) SEN	Matar Dieye	13	7	11+2	7	0	0
77	FW	(Ukraine) UKR	Maksym Dehtyarov	30	8	19+10	8	0+1	0
Players transferred out during the season
5	DF	(Ukraine) UKR	Anton Kravchenko	15	1	12+2	1	1	0
9	MF	(Ukraine) UKR	Yevhen Morozenko	2	0	1+1	0	0	0
11	MF	(Ukraine) UKR	Dmytro Bilonoh	6	2	3+2	1	1	1
11	FW	(Ukraine) UKR	Artur Zahorulko	1	0	1	0	0	0
15	DF	(Ukraine) UKR	Serhiy Melinyshyn	1	0	1	0	0	0
19	MF	(Ukraine) UKR	Yevhen Troyanovskyi	6	0	0+5	0	1	0
22	FW	(Ukraine) UKR	Stanislav Bilenkyi	2	0	0+2	0	0	0
23	DF	(Ukraine) UKR	Dmytro Nyemchaninov	10	0	6+2	0	2	0
27	FW	(Ukraine) UKR	Anton Shynder	10	1	2+7	1	1	0
79	DF	(Ukraine) UKR	Serhiy Vakulenko	11	2	11	2	0	0
87	DF	(Ukraine) UKR	Yevhen Zubeyko	18	0	16	0	1+1	0

Source: Competitions

Last updated: 31 May 2019

=== Goalscorers ===
Rank	No.	Pos	Nat	Name	Premier League	Cup	Total
1	77	FW	(Ukraine)	Maksym Dehtyarov	8	0	8
2	25	FW	(Senegal)	Matar Dieye	7	0	7
3	9	MF	(Ukraine)	Oleksiy Gai	3	1	4
3	41	MF	(Ukraine)	Hennadiy Pasich	4	0	4
3	42	MF	(Ukraine)	Yevhen Pasich	4	0	4
6	8	MF	(Ukraine)	Serhiy Politylo	2	1	3
6	17	MF	(Ukraine)	Vitaliy Balashov	3	0	3
8	11	MF	(Ukraine)	Dmytro Bilonoh	1	1	2
8	79	DF	(Ukraine)	Serhiy Vakulenko	2	0	2
10	4	DF	(Ukraine)	Dmytro Hryshko	1	0	1
10	5	DF	(Ukraine)	Anton Kravchenko	1	0	1
10	13	MF	(Ukraine)	Vitaliy Koltsov	1	0	1
10	27	FW	(Ukraine)	Anton Shynder	1	0	1
10	47	DF	(Ukraine)	Roman Vantukh	1	0	1
10	63	MF	(France)	Maxime Do Couto	1	0	1
				Own goal	1	0	1
				Total	41	3	44

Last updated: 31 May 2019

=== Clean sheets ===
Rank	No.	Pos	Nat	Name	Premier League	Cup	Total
1	1	GK	(Ukraine)	Volodymyr Krynskyi	3	0	3
1	37	GK	(Ukraine)	Kostyantyn Makhnovskyi	2	0	2
				Total	5	0	5

Last updated: 31 May 2019

=== Disciplinary record ===
No.	Pos	Nat	Player	Premier League			Cup			Total		
No.	Pos	Nat	Player	Booked	(yellow card) (yellow-red card)	Sent off (straight red)	Booked	(yellow card) (yellow-red card)	Sent off (straight red)	Booked	(yellow card) (yellow-red card)	Sent off (straight red)
4	DF	(Ukraine)	Dmytro Hryshko	3	0	0	0	1	0	3	1	0
5	DF	(Ukraine)	Anton Kravchenko	4	0	0	0	0	0	4	0	0
8	MF	(Ukraine)	Serhiy Politylo	3	0	0	0	0	0	3	0	0
9	MF	(Ukraine)	Oleksiy Gai	1	0	0	0	0	0	1	0	0
9	MF	(Ukraine)	Yevhen Morozenko	1	0	0	0	0	0	1	0	0
13	MF	(Ukraine)	Vitaliy Koltsov	2	0	0	2	0	0	4	0	0
15	DF	(Ukraine)	Serhiy Melinyshyn	1	0	0	0	0	0	1	0	0
17	MF	(Ukraine)	Vitaliy Balashov	3	0	0	0	0	0	3	0	0
19	MF	(Ukraine)	Yevhen Troyanovskyi	2	0	0	0	0	0	2	0	0
23	DF	(Ukraine)	Dmytro Nyemchaninov	1	0	0	0	0	0	1	0	0
25	FW	(Senegal)	Matar Dieye	3	0	0	0	0	0	3	0	0
27	FW	(Ukraine)	Anton Shynder	3	0	0	0	0	0	3	0	0
33	MF	(Ukraine)	Andriy Kravchuk	2	0	0	0	0	0	2	0	0
37	GK	(Ukraine)	Kostyantyn Makhnovskyi	3	0	0	0	0	0	3	0	0
41	MF	(Ukraine)	Hennadiy Pasich	4	1	0	1	0	0	5	1	0
42	MF	(Ukraine)	Yevhen Pasich	2	0	0	0	0	0	2	0	0
44	MF	(Ukraine)	Yevhen Tsymbalyuk	2	0	0	0	0	0	2	0	0
63	MF	(France)	Maxime Do Couto	2	1	0	1	0	0	3	1	0
74	DF	(Ukraine)	Ihor Snurnitsyn	2	0	0	0	0	0	2	0	0
77	FW	(Ukraine)	Maksym Dehtyarov	4	0	0	0	0	0	4	0	0
78	MF	(Ukraine)	Pavlo Ksyonz	4	0	0	0	0	0	4	0	0
79	DF	(Ukraine)	Serhiy Vakulenko	3	0	0	0	0	0	3	0	0
87	DF	(Ukraine)	Yevhen Zubeyko	3	0	0	0	0	0	3	0	0
88	MF	(Ukraine)	Rinar Valeyev	2	0	0	0	0	0	2	0	0
97	DF	(Ukraine)	Yehor Klymenchuk	2	0	0	0	0	0	2	0	0
			Total	59	2	0	4	1	0	63	3	0

Last updated: 31 May 2019
