= 2019–20 FC Olimpik Donetsk season =

Olimpik Donetsk
2019–20 season
- President: Vladyslav Helzin
- Manager: Júlio César (until 19 August 2019); Vicente Gómez (since 2 September 2019 until 13 March 2020); Ihor Klymovskyi (since 13 March 2020)
- Stadium: Dynamo Stadium, Kyiv
- Ukrainian Premier League: 9th
- Ukrainian Cup: Round of 16 (1/8)
- Top goalscorer: League: Shahab Zahedi (6); All: Shahab Zahedi (6)
- Highest home attendance: 4,500 (vs Shakhtar Donetsk, 1 September 2019)
- Lowest home attendance: 0 (all home matches were played behind closed doors starting 15 March 2020)
- Average home league attendance: 874
Home colours	Away colours

The 2019–20 season was sixth consecutive season in the top Ukrainian football league for Olimpik Donetsk. Olimpik competed in Premier League and Ukrainian Cup.

== Players ==
=== Squad information ===
As of 19 July 2020

Squad no.	Name	Nationality	Position	Date of birth (age)
Goalkeepers
1	Volodymyr Krynskyi	(Ukraine)	GK	14 January 1997 (aged 23)
12	Betim Halimi	(Kosovo) (Albania)	GK	28 February 1996 (aged 24)
30	Artem Kychak	(Ukraine)	GK	16 May 1989 (aged 31)
35	Andrii Chekotun ^{List B}	(Ukraine)	GK	2 September 2002 (aged 17)
Defenders
3	Dmytro Lytvyn	(Ukraine)	DF	21 November 1996 (aged 23)
4	Dmytro Hryshko (Captain)	(Ukraine)	DF	2 December 1985 (aged 34)
13	Ivan Zotko	(Ukraine)	DF	9 July 1996 (aged 24)
16	Pavlo Lukyanchuk	(Ukraine)	DF	19 May 1996 (aged 24)
29	Mykyta Kravchenko (on loan from Dynamo Kyiv)	(Ukraine)	DF	14 June 1997 (aged 23)
74	Ihor Snurnitsyn ^{List B}	(Ukraine)	DF	7 March 2000 (aged 20)
54	Orest Lebedenko ^{List B} (on loan from CD Lugo)	(Ukraine)	DF	23 September 1998 (aged 21)
Midfielders
7	Vitaliy Balashov	(Ukraine)	MF	15 January 1991 (aged 29)
9	Taras Zaviyskyi	(Ukraine)	MF	12 April 1995 (aged 25)
11	Pavlo Ksyonz	(Ukraine)	MF	2 January 1987 (aged 33)
14	Daniel Romanovskij	(Lithuania)	MF	19 June 1996 (aged 24)
19	Maxime Do Couto	(France)	MF	13 December 1996 (aged 23)
20	Temur Chogadze ^{List B}	(Georgia (country))	MF	5 May 1998 (aged 22)
21	Andriy Kravchuk ^{List B}	(Ukraine)	MF	26 February 1999 (aged 21)
31	Demir Imeri	(North Macedonia)	MF	27 October 1995 (aged 24)
42	Yevhen Pasich	(Ukraine)	MF	13 July 1993 (aged 27)
44	Yevhen Tsymbalyuk	(Ukraine)	MF	19 June 1996 (aged 24)
88	Nazar Verbnyi	(Ukraine)	MF	26 July 1997 (aged 22)
89	Serhiy Politylo	(Ukraine)	MF	29 January 1989 (aged 31)
99	Vitaliy Hoshkoderya	(Ukraine)	MF	8 January 1988 (aged 32)
Forwards
8	Shahab Zahedi	(Iran)	FW	18 August 1995 (aged 24)
17	Denys Balanyuk	(Ukraine)	FW	16 January 1997 (aged 23)
25	Matar Dieye	(Senegal)	FW	10 January 1998 (aged 22)
77	Maksym Dehtyarov	(Ukraine)	FW	30 May 1993 (aged 27)

== Transfers ==
=== In ===
Date	Pos.	Player	Age	Moving from	Type	Fee	Source
Summer
26 July 2019	GK	(Ukraine) Herman Penkov	25	(Ukraine) Karpaty Lviv	Transfer	Free	
26 July 2019	DF	(Nigeria) Aliyu Abubakar	25	(Belarus) FC Slutsk	Transfer	Free	
26 July 2019	DF	(Ukraine) Ivan Trubochkin	26	(Ukraine) Chornomorets Odesa	Transfer	Undisclosed	
26 July 2019	MF	(Brazil) Fabinho	23	(Ukraine) Metalist 1925 Kharkiv	Transfer	Undisclosed	
26 July 2019	MF	(Brazil) Luiz Fernando	23	(Ukraine) Metalist 1925 Kharkiv	Transfer	Undisclosed	
26 July 2019	FW	(Ukraine) Taras Zaviyskyi	24	(Germany) Buchonia Flieden	Transfer	Undisclosed	
31 July 2019	MF	(Burkina Faso) Dramane Salou	21	(Serbia) FK Partizan	Transfer	Free	
4 August 2019	FW	(Iran) Shahab Zahedi	23	Unattached	Transfer	Free	
16 August 2019	DF	(Ukraine) Ivan Zotko	23	(Spain) Elche	Transfer	Free	
22 August 2019	MF	(North Macedonia) Demir Imeri	23	(Malta) Mosta	Transfer	Free	
31 August 2019	FW	(Nigeria) Geoffrey Chinedu	21	(North Macedonia) Rabotnički	Transfer	Free	
13 September 2019	DF	(Ukraine) Pavlo Lukyanchuk	23	(Ukraine) Dynamo Kyiv	Transfer	Free	
Winter
9 January 2020	GK	(Ukraine) Artem Kychak	30	Unattached	Transfer	Free	
16 January 2020	MF	(Georgia (country)) Temur Chogadze	21	(Georgia (country)) Torpedo Kutaisi	Transfer	Undisclosed	
25 January 2020	MF	(Lithuania) Daniel Romanovskij	23	(Lithuania) Kauno Žalgiris	Transfer	Undisclosed	
25 January 2020	MF	(Ukraine) Nazar Verbnyi	22	(Ukraine) Karpaty Lviv	Transfer	Free	
10 February 2020	DF	(Ukraine) Dmytro Lytvyn	23	(Ukraine) Zorya Luhansk	Transfer	Free	
10 February 2020	FW	(Ukraine) Denys Balanyuk	23	Unattached	Transfer	Free	
17 June 2020	MF	(Ukraine) Vitaliy Hoshkoderya	32	(Ukraine) Chornomorets Odesa	Transfer	Free	
31 December 2019	MF	(Ukraine) Maksym Dehtyarov	26	(Ukraine) Desna Chernihiv	Loan return		
31 May 2020	FW	(Senegal) Matar Dieye	21	(Ukraine) Karpaty Lviv	Loan return		
1 January 2020	MF	(Ukraine) Mykyta Kravchenko	22	(Ukraine) Dynamo Kyiv	Loan		
1 January 2020	DF	(Ukraine) Orest Lebedenko	21	(Spain) CD Lugo	Loan		

=== Out ===
Date	Pos.	Player	Age	Moving to	Type	Fee	Source
Summer
1 June 2019	DF	(Nigeria) Darlington Igwekali	19	Unattached	Transfer	Free	
1 June 2019	MF	(Nigeria) David Enogela	21	Unattached	Transfer	Free	
1 June 2019	MF	(Ukraine) Illia Tymoshenko	20	Unattached	Transfer	Free	
28 June 2019	MF	(Ukraine) Oleksiy Gai	36	Retired	Transfer	Free	
25 July 2019	MF	(Ukraine) Ivan Sondey	25	(Ukraine) MFC Mykolaiv	Transfer	Free	
27 July 2019	MF	(Ukraine) Vitaliy Koltsov	25	(Ukraine) Metalist 1925 Kharkiv	Transfer	Free	
9 August 2019	GK	(Ukraine) Dani Junior Ltayf	19	(Spain) CD Vitoria	Transfer	Free	
21 August 2019	MF	(Ukraine) Rinar Valeyev	31	(Ukraine) Obolon-Brovar Kyiv	Transfer	Free	
14 November 2019	MF	(Nigeria) Aliyu Abubakar	23	Unattached	Transfer	Free	
1 June 2019	GK	(Ukraine) Kostyantyn Makhnovskyi	30	(Ukraine) Desna Chernihiv	Loan return		
18 July 2019	FW	(Ukraine) Maksym Dehtyarov	26	(Ukraine) Desna Chernihiv	Loan		
Winter
23 January 2020	GK	(Ukraine) Herman Penkov	25	(Ukraine) FC Lviv	Transfer	Free	
2 February 2020	MF	(Brazil) Fabinho	23	(Latvia) Ventspils	Transfer	Undisclosed	
4 February 2020	DF	(Ukraine) Yehor Klymenchuk	22	(Ukraine) FC Lviv	Transfer	Free	
12 February 2020	MF	(Brazil) Luiz Fernando	23	(Ukraine) Balkany Zorya	Transfer	Undisclosed	
18 February 2020	MF	(Ukraine) Hennadiy Pasich	26	(Ukraine) Karpaty Lviv	Transfer	Free	
20 February 2020	DF	(Ukraine) Ivan Trubochkin	26	(Georgia (country)) Dinamo Tbilisi	Transfer	Free	
21 February 2020	MF	(Burkina Faso) Dramane Salou	21	(Belarus) FC Slutsk	Transfer	Undisclosed	
31 December 2019	DF	(Ukraine) Roman Vantukh	21	(Ukraine) Dynamo Kyiv	Loan return		
10 February 2020	FW	(Senegal) Matar Dieye	21	(Ukraine) Karpaty Lviv	Loan		
5 March 2020	FW	(Nigeria) Geoffrey Chinedu	22	(Estonia) Narva Trans	Loan		

== Pre-season and friendlies ==
3 July 2019 Friendly	Olimpik Donetsk (Ukraine)	5–0	(Ukraine) MFC Mykolaiv	Shchaslyve
10:30 EEST (UTC+03:00)	Politylo 30'; Dehtyarov 45'; 48'; 84'; 87'	Report

3 July 2019 Friendly	Obolon-Brovar Kyiv (Ukraine)	1–0	(Ukraine) Olimpik Donetsk	Bucha
17:30 EEST (UTC+03:00)	Maydanevych 14'	Report		Stadium: Obolon training facility

9 July 2019 Friendly	SC Dnipro-1 (Ukraine)	2–1	(Ukraine) Olimpik Donetsk	Dnipro
17:00 EEST (UTC+03:00)	Lohinov 12'; Supriaha 30'	Report	Yevhen Pasich 16'	Stadium: Dnipro-Arena

13 July 2019 Friendly	Olimpik Donetsk (Ukraine)	1–1	(Ukraine) FC Vovchansk	Vysokyi
17:00 EEST (UTC+03:00)	55'	Report	90' (pen.)	Stadium: Metalist training facility

16 July 2019 Friendly	Olimpik Donetsk (Ukraine)	1–2	(Ukraine) Avanhard Kramatorsk	Vysokyi
17:00 EEST (UTC+03:00)	Do Couto 27'	Report	25'; 44'	Stadium: Metalist training facility

19 July 2019 Friendly	Metalist 1925 Kharkiv (Ukraine)	0–3	(Ukraine) Olimpik Donetsk	Vysokyi
11:00 EEST (UTC+03:00)		Report	Do Couto 5'; Politylo 50'; 85'	Stadium: Metalist training facility

20 July 2019 Friendly	Shakhtar Donetsk (Ukraine)	3–0	(Ukraine) Olimpik Donetsk	Kyiv
18:00 EEST (UTC+03:00)	Alan Patrick 25', 57'; Moraes 88'	Report		Stadium: Svyatoshin olympic complex

25 July 2019 Friendly	Olimpik Donetsk (Ukraine)	1–0	(Georgia (country)) Shevardeni-1906 Tbilisi	Shchaslyve
17:00 EEST (UTC+03:00)	Hennadiy Pasich 35'	Report

13 October 2019 Friendly	Olimpik Donetsk (Ukraine)	2–0	(Ukraine) Kolos Kovalivka	Shchaslyve
15:00 EEST (UTC+03:00)	Zahedi 37', 81'	Report		Stadium: Olimpik training facility

17 January 2020 Friendly	Viitorul Constanța (Romania)	1–2	(Ukraine) Olimpik Donetsk	Belek, Turkey
11:00 EET (UTC+02:00)	35'	Report	Chogadze 10'; Tsymbalyuk 67'	Stadium: Sueno Hotels sport complex

18 January 2020 Friendly	Sabail (Azerbaijan)	1–3	(Ukraine) Olimpik Donetsk	Antalya, Turkey
17:00 EET (UTC+02:00)	Essien 68'	Report	Zahedi 27'; Balashov 30'; Balanyuk 75'	Stadium: Miracle Resort sport complex

22 January 2020 Friendly	Korona Kielce (Poland)	0–2	(Ukraine) Olimpik Donetsk	Antalya, Turkey
17:00 EET (UTC+02:00)		Report	Zaviyskyi 35'; Zahedi 86'	Stadium: Topkapi

26 January 2020 Friendly	Spartak Trnava (Slovakia)	0–1	(Ukraine) Olimpik Donetsk	Antalya, Turkey
17:00 EET (UTC+02:00)		Report	Zahedi 30'	Stadium: Arcadia

27 January 2020 Friendly	Olimpik Donetsk (Ukraine)	4–0	(Serbia) Spartak Subotica	Antalya, Turkey
14:30 EET (UTC+02:00)	Zaviyskyi 10'; Dieye 40'; Zahedi 51'; Romanovskij 87'	Report		Stadium: Mardan sports complex

4 February 2020 Friendly	Olimpik Donetsk (Ukraine)	4–0	(Bulgaria) Lokomotiv Plovdiv	Antalya, Turkey
17:30 EET (UTC+02:00)	Tsymbalyuk 40'; Zahedi 61' (pen.); Kravchuk 63'; Dehtyarov 90'	Report		Stadium: Titanic sports complex

7 February 2020 Friendly	Rabotnički Skopje (North Macedonia)	1–1	(Ukraine) Olimpik Donetsk	Antalya, Turkey
11:00 EET (UTC+02:00)	Zotko 38'	Report	Toshevski 35'	Stadium: Miracle Resort sport complex

8 February 2020 Friendly	Olimpik Donetsk (Ukraine)	3–0	(Luxembourg) Racing-Union	Antalya, Turkey
15:00 EET (UTC+02:00)	Lebedenko 29'; Chogadze 60'; Zahedi 79'	Report		Stadium: Titanic sports complex

13 February 2020 Friendly	Dinamo Batumi (Georgia (country))	0–1	(Ukraine) Olimpik Donetsk	Belek, Turkey
17:30 EET (UTC+02:00)		Report	Balashov 20'	Stadium: Papillon sport complex

14 February 2020 Friendly	Olimpik Donetsk (Ukraine)	2–0	(Kazakhstan) Kaisar Kyzylorda	Antalya, Turkey
13:00 EET (UTC+02:00)	Balanyuk 35'; Chogadze 40'	Report		Stadium: Mardan sports complex

23 May 2020 Friendly	Kolos Kovalivka (Ukraine)	1–2	(Ukraine) Olimpik Donetsk	Mala Soltanivka
17:00 EEST (UTC+03:00)	Maksymenko 105'	Report	Do Couto 73'; Lebedenko 85'	Stadium: Saltik; Referee: Serhiy Boyko

27 May 2020 Friendly	Dynamo Kyiv (Ukraine)	2–0	(Ukraine) Olimpik Donetsk	Kyiv
14:00 EEST (UTC+03:00)	Tsitaishvili 2', 4'	Report		Stadium: Dynamo Stadium; Referee: Klym Zabroda

== Competitions ==
=== Overall ===
Competition	First match	Last match	Starting round	Final position	Record							
Competition	First match	Last match	Starting round	Final position	Pld	W	D	L	GF	GA	GD	Win %
Premier League	31 July 2019	16 July 2020	Matchday 1	9th	32	10	6	16	32	47	−15	31.25
Cup	25 September 2019	30 October 2019	Third Preliminary round (1/16)	Round of 16 (1/8)	2	1	0	1	3	3	+0	50.00
Total					34	11	6	17	35	50	−15	32.35

Last updated: 19 July 2020
Source: Competitions

=== Premier League ===
==== League table ====
Pos	Team	Pld	W	D	L	GF	GA	GD	Pts	Qualification or relegation
7	SC Dnipro-1	32	15	4	13	42	42	0	49	Qualification for the playoff for Europa League second qualifying round
8	FC Mariupol	32	12	9	11	40	46	−6	45	Qualification for the playoff for Europa League second qualifying round
9	Olimpik Donetsk	32	10	6	16	32	47	−15	36	
10	Vorskla Poltava	32	9	7	16	23	48	−25	34	
11	FC Lviv	32	5	9	18	25	57	−32	24	

Source: Ukrainian Premier League, UEFA, Soccerway
Rules for classification: 1) Points; 2) Head-to-head points; 3) Head-to-head goal difference; 4) Head-to-head higher number of goals scored; 5) Goal difference; 6) Higher number of goals scored; 7) Draw or "golden match" if tied for title (Article 22, paragraph 3).

==== Results summary ====
Overall								Home						Away					
Pld	W	D	L	GF	GA	GD	Pts	W	D	L	GF	GA	GD	W	D	L	GF	GA	GD
32	10	6	16	32	47	−15	36	4	3	9	14	28	−14	6	3	7	18	19	−1

Last updated: 19 July 2020.
Source: Competitive matches

==== Results by round ====
Round	1	2	3	4	5	6	7	8	9	10	11	12	13	14	15	16	17	18	19	20	21	22	23	24	25	26	27	28	29	30	31	32
Ground	A	H	A	H	A	H	A	A	H	A	H	H	A	H	A	H	A	H	H	A	H	A	H	A	H	H	A	A	H	A	A	H
Result	L	L	L	L	D	L	D	W	L	L	W	W	W	D	W	L	L	L	L	L	L	L	D	L	D	W	W	D	L	W	W	W
Position	12	11	12	12	12	12	12	12	12	12	10	9	7	7	6	7	9	9	9	10	10	11	11	11	11	9	10	10	10	10	10	9

Updated to match(es) played on 19 July 2020. Source: Competitive matches
A = Away; H = Home; W = Win; D = Draw; L = Loss

==== Matches ====
31 July 2019 1	SC Dnipro-1	2–0	Olimpik Donetsk	Dnipro
19:00 EEST (UTC+03:00)	Buletsa 2'; Supriaha 9'; Batahov (yellow card) 18'; Romanyuk (yellow card) 34'	Report	Abubakar (yellow card) 56'; Hryshko (yellow card) 90+3'	Stadium: Dnipro-Arena; Attendance: 7,074; Referee: Ivan Bondar

4 August 2019 2	Olimpik Donetsk	0–1	Kolos Kovalivka	Kyiv
17:00 EEST (UTC+03:00)	Fabinho (yellow card) 48'; Penkov (red card) 66'; Zaviyskyi (yellow card) 70'; Zahedi (yellow card) 85'; Abubakar (red card) 90+3'	Report	Smyrnyi (yellow card) 8' (yellow-red card) 43'; Zadoya (yellow card) 49'; Havrysh 68' (pen.)	Stadium: Dynamo Stadium; Attendance: 2,360; Referee: Dmytro Kryvushkin

10 August 2019 3	FC Oleksandriya	2–1	Olimpik Donetsk	Oleksandriya
19:30 EEST (UTC+03:00)	Bezborodko (yellow card) 29', (goal) 61'; Shendrik 43'; Bukhal (yellow card) 51' (yellow-red card) 74'; Banada (yellow card) 66'; Pashayev (yellow card) 90+3'	Report	Zahedi (yellow card) 15'; Vantukh (yellow card) 33' (yellow-red card) 59'; Salou (yellow card) 48'; Dieye 56'; Yevhen Pasich (yellow card) 72'	Stadium: CSC Nika Stadium; Attendance: 1,602; Referee: Andriy Kovalenko

18 August 2019 4	Olimpik Donetsk	1–3	Karpaty Lviv	Kyiv
17:00 EEST (UTC+03:00)	Dieye (yellow card) 4'; Fabinho (yellow card) 10' (red card) 24'; Hennadiy Pasich (yellow card) 32'; Politylo 62' (pen.)	Report	Hutsulyak 25', 65'; Vakulenko (yellow card) 35'; Di Franco 42'; Dubinchak (yellow card) 61'	Stadium: Dynamo Stadium; Attendance: 800; Referee: Denys Shurman

24 August 2019 5	Dynamo Kyiv	1–1	Olimpik Donetsk	Kyiv
19:30 EEST (UTC+03:00)	Tsyhankov 62'; Burda (yellow card) 73'; Verbič (red card) 85'; Kádár (yellow card) 90+1'; Kadiri (yellow card) 90+3'	Report	Politylo 52'; Hryshko (red card) 68'; Zaviyskyi (yellow card) 85'; Salou (yellow card) 85'	Stadium: NSC Olimpiyskiy; Attendance: 14,713; Referee: Vitaliy Romanov

1 September 2019 6	Olimpik Donetsk	0–4	Shakhtar Donetsk	Kyiv
17:00 EEST (UTC+03:00)	Zaviyskyi (yellow card) 27'; Zotko (yellow card) 53'	Report	Marlos (yellow card) 10', (goal) 60'; Moraes 13', 80'; Solomon 45+2'; Bondar (yellow card) 87'	Stadium: Dynamo Stadium; Attendance: 4,500; Referee: Serhiy Boyko

15 September 2019 7	FC Mariupol	1–1	Olimpik Donetsk	Mariupol
14:00 EEST (UTC+03:00)	Topalov (yellow card) 20'; Kyryukhantsev 43'; Bykov (yellow card) 62'; Yavorskyi (yellow card) 81'; Vakula (yellow card) 90+1'	Report	Imeri 58'; Lukyanchuk (yellow card) 75'; Tsymbalyuk (yellow card) 90+1'; Ksyonz (yellow card) 90+1'	Stadium: Volodymyr Boiko Stadium; Attendance: 3,482; Referee: Oleksandr Derdo

21 September 2019 8	FC Lviv	0–1	Olimpik Donetsk	Lviv
14:00 EEST (UTC+03:00)	Honchar (yellow card) 32' (yellow-red card) 45+1'; China (yellow card) 45'; Alvaro (yellow card) 67'; Nasonov (yellow card) 79'; Borzenko (yellow card) 86'	Report	Zaviyskyi (yellow card) 9'; Dieye (yellow card) 22'; Imeri (yellow card) 66'; Politylo (yellow card) 75', (goal) 80' (pen.); Lukyanchuk (yellow card) 90+4'	Stadium: Ukraina Stadium; Attendance: 550; Referee: Dmytro Kutakov

29 September 2019 9	Olimpik Donetsk	0–5	Zorya Luhansk	Kyiv
19:30 EEST (UTC+03:00)	Ksyonz (red card) 37'	Report	Yurchenko 40'; Abu Hanna (yellow card) 49'; Rusyn 53', 87'; Lyednyev 73'; Kabayev 80'; Cheberko (yellow card) 88'	Stadium: Dynamo Stadium; Attendance: 1,912; Referee: Serhiy Boyko

5 October 2019 10	Desna Chernihiv	1–0	Olimpik Donetsk	Chernihiv
17:00 EEST (UTC+03:00)	Khlyobas (yellow card) 35'; Mostovyi (yellow card) 37'; Artem Favorov 90', (yellow card) 90+1'	Report	Hennadiy Pasich (yellow card) 52'; Zaviyskyi (red card) 65'	Stadium: Chernihiv Stadium; Attendance: 3,682; Referee: Yuriy Mozharovskyi

20 October 2019 11	Olimpik Donetsk	2–0	Vorskla Poltava	Kyiv
19:30 EEST (UTC+03:00)	Do Couto 67'; Lukyanchuk 75'; Zahedi (yellow card) 89'	Report	Sapay (yellow card) 22'; Chelyadin (yellow card) 71'	Stadium: Dynamo Stadium; Attendance: 329; Referee: Oleksandr Derdo

26 October 2019 12	Olimpik Donetsk	3–2	SC Dnipro-1	Kyiv
17:00 EEST (UTC+03:00)	Do Couto 11'; Kravchuk 69'; Vantukh 81'	Report	Kohut 4'; Supriaha (yellow card) 39'; Vakulko (yellow card) 61'; Safronov (yellow card) 66' (yellow-red card) 68'; Nazarenko 70'; Polyovyi (yellow card) 84'	Stadium: Dynamo Stadium; Attendance: 430; Referee: Yevhen Aranovskyi

3 November 2019 13	Kolos Kovalivka	1–2	Olimpik Donetsk	Kyiv
19:30 EET (UTC+02:00)	Paramonov (yellow card) 28'; Kostyshyn (yellow card) 41'; Ilyin (yellow card) 51'; Orikhovskyi 70'; Chornomorets (yellow card) 87'	Report	Yevhen Pasich 59'; Tsymbalyuk (yellow card) 69'; Balashov 88' (pen.); Chinedu (yellow card) 90+1'	Stadium: Obolon Arena; Attendance: 1,276; Referee: Ivan Bondar

10 November 2019 14	Olimpik Donetsk	0–0	FC Oleksandriya	Kyiv
19:30 EET (UTC+02:00)	Zotko (yellow card) 28'; Hryshko (yellow card) 84'; Fabinho (yellow card) 90+3'	Report	Pankiv (red card) 79'; Kovalets (yellow card) 55'; Babohlo (yellow card) 58'; Dovhyi (yellow card) 66'; Bilyk (yellow card) 90+3'	Stadium: Dynamo Stadium; Attendance: 350; Referee: Serhiy Boyko

24 November 2019 15	Karpaty Lviv	1–2	Olimpik Donetsk	Lviv
14:00 EET (UTC+02:00)	Nazaryna 9'; Dubinchak (yellow card) 71'	Report	Zotko (yellow card) 11'; Tsymbalyuk 26'; Zahedi 45+2'; Snurnitsyn (yellow card) 60'; Lukyanchuk (yellow card) 89'; Do Couto (yellow card) 90+1'	Stadium: Ukraina Stadium; Attendance: 754; Referee: Andriy Kovalenko

1 December 2019 16	Olimpik Donetsk	1–3	Dynamo Kyiv	Kyiv
19:30 EET (UTC+02:00)	Tsymbalyuk (yellow card) 16'; Zahedi 38'; Do Couto (yellow card) 41'; Penkov (yellow card) 68'; Kravchuk (red card) 73'	Report	Besyedin 37', 79', (yellow card) 54' de Pena 87', (yellow card) 87'	Stadium: Dynamo Stadium; Attendance: 1,506; Referee: Vitaliy Romanov

6 December 2019 17	Shakhtar Donetsk	3–0	Olimpik Donetsk	Kharkiv
19:30 EET (UTC+02:00)	Matviyenko 4'; Marlos 77'; Ismaily 90+1'; Taison (yellow card) 90+5'	Report	Ksyonz (yellow card) 13'; Politylo (yellow card) 90+5'	Stadium: OSC Metalist; Attendance: 2,372; Referee: Dmytro Bondarenko

14 December 2019 18	Olimpik Donetsk	1–2	FC Mariupol	Kyiv
19:30 EET (UTC+02:00)	Zahedi 49'; Krynskyi (yellow card) 52'; Klymenchuk (yellow card) 69'	Report	Fedorchuk (yellow card) 3'; Yavorskyi (yellow card) 12'; Churko 53' (pen.), (yellow card) 78'; Lukyanchuk 89' (o.g.); Chekh (yellow card) 89'	Stadium: Dynamo Stadium; Attendance: 254; Referee: Oleksandr Omelchenko

23 February 2020 19	Olimpik Donetsk	0–1	FC Lviv	Kyiv
19:30 EET (UTC+02:00)	Lebedenko (yellow card) 39'; Tsymbalyuk (yellow card) 90+3'	Report	Rafael Sabino (yellow card) 26'; China (yellow card) 55'; Bohunov 84'	Stadium: Dynamo Stadium; Attendance: 357; Referee: Kostyantyn Trukhanov

1 March 2020 20	Zorya Luhansk	1–0	Olimpik Donetsk	Zaporizhia
14:00 EET (UTC+02:00)	Kocherhin (yellow card) 19'; Yurchenko (yellow card) 35'; Vernydub (yellow card) 60'; Kabayev 77'; Khomchenovskyi (yellow card) 85'; Mykhaylychenko (yellow card) 89'; Cheberko (yellow card) 90+6'	Report	Lebedenko (yellow card) 88'	Stadium: Slavutych-Arena; Attendance: 2,411; Referee: Serhiy Boyko

4 March 2020 21	Olimpik Donetsk	1–2	Desna Chernihiv	Kyiv
17:00 EET (UTC+02:00)	Dehtyarov 4', (yellow card) 40'; Kravchenko (yellow card) 33'; Lytvyn (yellow card) 50'	Report	Filippov 6', (yellow card) 10'; Tamm (yellow card) 70'; Arveladze 76'; Budkivskyi (yellow card) 84'; Past (yellow card) 90+3'	Stadium: Dynamo Stadium; Attendance: 320; Referee: Viktor Kopiyevskyi

7 March 2020 22	Vorskla Poltava	1–0	Olimpik Donetsk	Poltava
14:00 EET (UTC+02:00)	Chesnakov (yellow card) 34'; Šehić (yellow card) 47'; Kulach (yellow card) 58', (goal) 63' (pen.)	Report	Ksyonz (yellow card) 23'; Zotko (yellow card) 26'; Zahedi (yellow card) 28'; Kravchuk (yellow card) 38' (yellow-red card) 78'; Dehtyarov (yellow card) 43'; Hryshko (yellow card) 62'; Balanyuk (yellow card) 90+3'	Stadium: Vorskla Stadium; Attendance: 3,463; Referee: Dmytro Kutakov

15 March 2020 23	Olimpik Donetsk	1–1	Vorskla Poltava	Kyiv
19:30 EET (UTC+02:00)	Balanyuk 21'; Kychak (yellow card) 22'	Report	Yakubu (yellow card) 9'; Kulach 42'; Sklyar (yellow card) 70'	Stadium: Dynamo Stadium; Attendance: 0 Referee: Yaroslav Kozyk
Note: Match was played behind closed doors due to quarantine in Ukraine during COVID-19 pandemic.

30 May 2020 24	SC Dnipro-1	3–1	Olimpik Donetsk	Dnipro
17:00 EET (UTC+02:00)	Buletsa 32'; Vakulko (yellow card) 41'; Adamyuk 62'; Lucas Taylor 77'	Report	Kravchuk (yellow card) 35'; Zahedi (yellow card) 54'; Zotko (yellow card) 69'; Politylo 90+3' (pen.)	Stadium: Dnipro-Arena; Attendance: 0 Referee: Andriy Kovalenko
Note: Match was played behind closed doors due to quarantine in Ukraine during COVID-19 pandemic.

7 June 2020 25	Olimpik Donetsk	2–2	FC Mariupol	Kyiv
14:00 EEST (UTC+03:00)	Zotko (yellow card) 12'; Balashov 16'; Zahedi (yellow card) 21'; Kravchuk 83'	Report	Chobotenko 35', (yellow card) 87'; Fedorchuk (yellow card) 42'; Kashchuk 85'	Stadium: Dynamo Stadium; Attendance: 0 Referee: Oleksandr Derdo
Note: Match was played behind closed doors due to quarantine in Ukraine during COVID-19 pandemic.

13 June 2020 26	Olimpik Donetsk	2–0	FC Lviv	Kyiv
19:30 EEST (UTC+03:00)	Romanovskij (yellow card) 5'; Tsymbalyuk (yellow card) 33'; Zotko (yellow card) 35'; Do Couto 53', 84'; Kravchenko (yellow card) 81'; Kychak (yellow card) 90+3'	Report	China (yellow card) 24'; Borzenko (yellow card) 56'; Tatarkov (yellow card) 64'; Alvaro (yellow card) 68'; Nych (yellow card) 88'	Stadium: Dynamo Stadium; Attendance: 0 Referee: Dmytro Kryvushkin
Note: Match was played behind closed doors due to quarantine in Ukraine during COVID-19 pandemic.

21 June 2020 27	Karpaty Lviv	– +	Olimpik Donetsk	Lviv
EEST (UTC+03:00)		Report		Stadium: Ukraina Stadium
Note: Technical victory

28 June 2020 28	Vorskla Poltava	0–0	Olimpik Donetsk	Poltava
19:30 EEST (UTC+03:00)	Puclin (yellow card) 41'	Report	Zahedi (yellow card) 22'; Kychak (yellow card) 45+2'; Politylo (yellow card) 45+2'; Verbnyi (yellow card) 53'; Zotko (yellow card) 88'	Stadium: Vorskla Stadium; Attendance: 0 Referee: Viktor Kopiyevskyi
Note: Match was played behind closed doors due to quarantine in Ukraine during COVID-19 pandemic.

5 July 2020 29	Olimpik Donetsk	0–2	SC Dnipro-1	Kyiv
19:30 EEST (UTC+03:00)	Kravchenko (yellow card) 9'; Hryshko (yellow card) 63'	Report	Supriaha 1'; Tsurikov (yellow card) 15'; Khoblenko (yellow card) 56'; Buletsa 64'; Klishchuk (yellow card) 80'	Stadium: Dynamo Stadium; Attendance: 0 Referee: Dmytro Kutakov
Note: Match was played behind closed doors due to quarantine in Ukraine during COVID-19 pandemic.

12 July 2020 30	FC Mariupol	1–4	Olimpik Donetsk	Mariupol
17:00 EEST (UTC+03:00)	Myshnyov 66'	Report	Zaviyskyi 8', 30'; Dehtyarov 14', 55'; Lytvyn (yellow card) 85'	Stadium: Volodymyr Boiko Stadium; Attendance: 0 Referee: Volodymyr Novokhatniy
Note: Match was played behind closed doors due to quarantine in Ukraine during COVID-19 pandemic.

16 July 2020 31	FC Lviv	1–5	Olimpik Donetsk	Lviv
17:00 EEST (UTC+03:00)	Renan 4'; Nedolya (yellow card) 19' (yellow-red card) 40'; Bopesu (yellow card) 45+1'; Klymenchuk (yellow card) 80'	Report	Dehtyarov 16', 42'; Snurnitsyn (yellow card) 24'; Zahedi 26', 80', 90'; Lebedenko (yellow card) 51'; Zotko (yellow card) 53'; Kravchuk (yellow card) 75'; Zaviyskyi (yellow card) 76'	Stadium: Ukraina Stadium; Attendance: 0 Referee: Denys Shurman
Note: Match was played behind closed doors due to quarantine in Ukraine during COVID-19 pandemic.

19 July 2020 32	Olimpik Donetsk	+ – -	Karpaty Lviv	Kyiv
EEST (UTC+03:00)		Report		Stadium: Dynamo Stadium

=== Ukrainian Cup ===
25 September 2019 3rd Preliminary round	Kremin Kremenchuk	2–3	Olimpik Donetsk	Poltava
15:00 EEST (UTC+03:00)	Sydorenko 9', (yellow card) 65'; Koshman (yellow card) 58', (goal) 76'	Report	Chinedu 15'; Zotko 41' (pen.); Honcharenko 54' (o.g.); Zahedi (yellow card) 81'; Kravchuk (yellow card) 82'	Stadium: Lokomotyv Stadium; Attendance: 200; Referee: Volodymyr Novokhatniy

30 October 2019 Round of 16 (1/8)	FC Mariupol	1–0	Olimpik Donetsk	Mariupol
14:00 EEST (UTC+03:00)	Bykov (yellow card) 42'; Yavorskyi (yellow card) 53'; Churko 90+3'	Report	Kravchuk (yellow card) 51'; Zaviyskyi (yellow card) 62'	Stadium: Volodymyr Boiko Stadium; Attendance: 1,917; Referee: Yuriy Ivanov

== Statistics ==
=== Appearances and goals ===
No.	Pos	Nat	Player	Total		Premier League		Cup	
No.	Pos	Nat	Player	Apps	Goals	Apps	Goals	Apps	Goals
Goalkeepers
1	GK	(Ukraine) UKR	Volodymyr Krynskyi	15	0	15	0	0	0
12	GK	(Kosovo) KOS	Betim Halimi	6	0	5+1	0	0	0
30	GK	(Ukraine) UKR	Artem Kychak	5	0	5	0	0	0
35	GK	(Ukraine) UKR	Andrii Chekotun	1	0	1	0	0	0
Defenders
3	DF	(Ukraine) UKR	Dmytro Lytvyn	5	0	4+1	0	0	0
4	DF	(Ukraine) UKR	Dmytro Hryshko	27	0	26	0	1	0
13	DF	(Ukraine) UKR	Ivan Zotko	17	1	16	0	1	1
16	DF	(Ukraine) UKR	Pavlo Lukyanchuk	12	1	8+3	1	1	0
29	DF	(Ukraine) UKR	Mykyta Kravchenko	12	0	12	0	0	0
54	DF	(Ukraine) UKR	Orest Lebedenko	10	0	10	0	0	0
74	DF	(Ukraine) UKR	Ihor Snurnitsyn	11	0	10	0	1	0
Midfielders
7	MF	(Ukraine) UKR	Vitaliy Balashov	20	2	9+10	2	1	0
9	MF	(Ukraine) UKR	Taras Zaviyskyi	22	2	14+6	2	2	0
11	MF	(Ukraine) UKR	Pavlo Ksyonz	24	0	18+5	0	1	0
14	MF	(Lithuania) LTU	Daniel Romanovskij	8	0	6+2	0	0	0
19	MF	(France) FRA	Maxime Do Couto	28	4	20+7	4	0+1	0
20	MF	(Georgia (country)) GEO	Temur Chogadze	5	0	2+3	0	0	0
21	MF	(Ukraine) UKR	Andriy Kravchuk	18	2	12+4	2	1+1	0
31	MF	(North Macedonia) MKD	Demir Imeri	10	1	5+3	1	1+1	0
42	MF	(Ukraine) UKR	Yevhen Pasich	20	1	11+7	1	2	0
44	MF	(Ukraine) UKR	Yevhen Tsymbalyuk	26	1	24	1	1+1	0
88	MF	(Ukraine) UKR	Nazar Verbnyi	5	0	2+3	0	0	0
89	MF	(Ukraine) UKR	Serhiy Politylo	29	4	26+2	4	0+1	0
99	MF	(Ukraine) UKR	Vitaliy Hoshkoderya	2	0	0+2	0	0	0
Forwards
8	FW	(Iran) IRN	Shahab Zahedi	24	6	17+6	6	1	0
17	FW	(Ukraine) UKR	Denys Balanyuk	7	1	2+5	1	0	0
25	FW	(Senegal) SEN	Matar Dieye	10	1	10	1	0	0
77	FW	(Ukraine) UKR	Maksym Dehtyarov	7	5	5+2	5	0	0
Players transferred out during the season
3	DF	(Ukraine) UKR	Ivan Trubochkin	3	0	1+2	0	0	0
18	DF	(Nigeria) NGA	Aliyu Abubakar	2	0	2	0	0	0
41	MF	(Ukraine) UKR	Hennadiy Pasich	10	0	3+6	0	1	0
47	DF	(Ukraine) UKR	Roman Vantukh	11	1	9+1	1	0+1	0
70	MF	(Brazil) BRA	Fabinho	14	0	7+6	0	1	0
71	GK	(Ukraine) UKR	Herman Penkov	6	0	4	0	2	0
77	MF	(Burkina Faso) BFA	Dramane Salou	8	0	5+2	0	1	0
97	DF	(Ukraine) UKR	Yehor Klymenchuk	5	0	2+2	0	1	0
99	FW	(Nigeria) NGA	Geoffrey Chinedu	13	1	1+10	0	2	1

Source: Competitions

Last updated: 19 July 2020

=== Goalscorers ===
Rank	No.	Pos	Nat	Name	Premier League	Cup	Total
1	8	FW	(Iran)	Shahab Zahedi	6	0	6
2	77	FW	(Ukraine)	Maksym Dehtyarov	5	0	5
3	19	MF	(France)	Maxime Do Couto	4	0	4
3	89	MF	(Ukraine)	Serhiy Politylo	4	0	4
5	7	MF	(Ukraine)	Vitaliy Balashov	2	0	2
5	9	MF	(Ukraine)	Taras Zaviyskyi	2	0	2
5	21	MF	(Ukraine)	Andriy Kravchuk	2	0	2
8	13	DF	(Ukraine)	Ivan Zotko	0	1	1
8	16	DF	(Ukraine)	Pavlo Lukyanchuk	1	0	1
8	17	FW	(Ukraine)	Denys Balanyuk	1	0	1
8	25	FW	(Senegal)	Matar Dieye	1	0	1
8	31	MF	(North Macedonia)	Demir Imeri	1	0	1
8	42	MF	(Ukraine)	Yevhen Pasich	1	0	1
8	44	MF	(Ukraine)	Yevhen Tsymbalyuk	1	0	1
8	47	DF	(Ukraine)	Roman Vantukh	1	0	1
8	99	FW	(Nigeria)	Geoffrey Chinedu	0	1	1
				Own goal	0	1	1
				Total	32	3	35

Last updated: 19 July 2020

=== Clean sheets ===
Rank	No.	Pos	Nat	Name	Premier League	Cup	Total
1	1	GK	(Ukraine)	Volodymyr Krynskyi	4	0	4
2	30	GK	(Ukraine)	Artem Kychak	2	0	2
				Total	6	0	6

Last updated: 19 July 2020

=== Disciplinary record ===
No.	Pos	Nat	Player	Premier League			Cup			Total		
No.	Pos	Nat	Player	Booked	(yellow card) (yellow-red card)	Sent off (straight red)	Booked	(yellow card) (yellow-red card)	Sent off (straight red)	Booked	(yellow card) (yellow-red card)	Sent off (straight red)
1	GK	(Ukraine)	Volodymyr Krynskyi	1	0	0	0	0	0	1	0	0
3	DF	(Ukraine)	Dmytro Lytvyn	2	0	0	0	0	0	2	0	0
4	DF	(Ukraine)	Dmytro Hryshko	4	0	1	0	0	0	4	0	1
8	FW	(Iran)	Shahab Zahedi	7	0	0	1	0	0	8	0	0
9	MF	(Ukraine)	Taras Zaviyskyi	5	0	1	1	0	0	6	0	1
11	MF	(Ukraine)	Pavlo Ksyonz	3	0	1	0	0	0	3	0	1
13	DF	(Ukraine)	Ivan Zotko	9	0	0	0	0	0	9	0	0
14	MF	(Lithuania)	Daniel Romanovskij	1	0	0	0	0	0	1	0	0
16	DF	(Ukraine)	Pavlo Lukyanchuk	3	0	0	0	0	0	3	0	0
17	FW	(Ukraine)	Denys Balanyuk	1	0	0	0	0	0	1	0	0
18	DF	(Nigeria)	Aliyu Abubakar	1	0	1	0	0	0	1	0	1
19	MF	(France)	Maxime Do Couto	2	0	0	0	0	0	2	0	0
21	MF	(Ukraine)	Andriy Kravchuk	2	1	1	2	0	0	4	1	1
25	FW	(Senegal)	Matar Dieye	2	0	0	0	0	0	2	0	0
29	DF	(Ukraine)	Mykyta Kravchenko	3	0	0	0	0	0	3	0	0
30	GK	(Ukraine)	Artem Kychak	3	0	0	0	0	0	3	0	0
31	MF	(North Macedonia)	Demir Imeri	1	0	0	0	0	0	1	0	0
41	MF	(Ukraine)	Hennadiy Pasich	2	0	0	0	0	0	2	0	0
42	MF	(Ukraine)	Yevhen Pasich	1	0	0	0	0	0	1	0	0
44	MF	(Ukraine)	Yevhen Tsymbalyuk	5	0	0	0	0	0	5	0	0
47	DF	(Ukraine)	Roman Vantukh	0	1	0	0	0	0	0	1	0
54	DF	(Ukraine)	Orest Lebedenko	3	0	0	0	0	0	3	0	0
70	MF	(Brazil)	Fabinho	3	0	1	0	0	0	3	0	1
71	GK	(Ukraine)	Herman Penkov	1	0	1	0	0	0	1	0	1
74	DF	(Ukraine)	Ihor Snurnitsyn	2	0	0	0	0	0	2	0	0
77	FW	(Ukraine)	Maksym Dehtyarov	2	0	0	0	0	0	2	0	0
77	MF	(Burkina Faso)	Dramane Salou	2	0	0	0	0	0	2	0	0
88	MF	(Ukraine)	Nazar Verbnyi	1	0	0	0	0	0	1	0	0
89	MF	(Ukraine)	Serhiy Politylo	3	0	0	0	0	0	3	0	0
97	DF	(Ukraine)	Yehor Klymenchuk	1	0	0	0	0	0	1	0	0
99	FW	(Nigeria)	Geoffrey Chinedu	1	0	0	0	0	0	1	0	0
			Total	77	2	7	4	0	0	81	2	7

Last updated: 19 July 2020

=== Attendances ===
	Matches	Attendances	Average	High	Low
Premier League	15	13,118	874	4,500	0
Cup	0	0	0	0	0
Total	15	13,118	874	4,500	0

Last updated: 19 July 2020
