= Betim Halimi =

Kosovan footballer

Personal information
- Full name: Betim Halimi
- Date of birth: 28 February 1996 (age 30)
- Place of birth: Pozharan, FR Yugoslavia
- Height: 2.04 m (6 ft 8 in)
- Position: Goalkeeper

Team information
- Current team: Suhareka
- Number: 1

Youth career
- 2010–2014: Vllaznia Pozheran

Senior career*
Years	Team	Apps	(Gls)
2014–2016	Vllaznia Pozheran		
2016	Drita	15	(0)
2016–2017	Hajvalia	3	(0)
2017–2018	Drita	22	(0)
2018–2019	Narva Trans	7	(0)
2019–2021	Olimpik Donetsk	18	(0)
2021–2022	Prishtina	16	(0)
2022–2023	Kukësi	9	(0)
2023–2024	Gjilani	12	(0)
2024–	Suhareka	6	(0)

International career^{‡}
2021	Kosovo	1	(0)
- * Club domestic league appearances and goals as of 5 January 2025 ‡ National team caps and goals as of 11 June 2021

Betim Halimi (born 28 February 1996) is a Kosovan professional footballer who plays as a goalkeeper for Kosovo Superleague club Suhareka.

== Club career ==
=== Early career and Drita ===
Halimi was part of Kosovo First League club Vllaznia Pozheran until 1 February 2016. On 19 January 2016, Telegrafi announced that he is on trial to Chelsea's under-18 team competing in the U18 Premier League, but unfortunately this test turned out to fail. On 1 February 2016, Halimi joined Kosovo Superleague side Drita, to replace the injured Artan Latifi and played 15 matches in the league.

=== Hajvalia ===
On 7 July 2016, Halimi joined Kosovo Superleague side Hajvalia. On 21 August 2016, he made his debut in a 4–0 away defeat against Ferizaj after being named in the starting line-up.

=== Return to Drita ===
On 30 December 2016, Halimi returned to Kosovo Superleague club Drita and this return would become legally effective two days later. On 26 February 2017, he made his debut in a 1–1 away win against Gjilani after being named in the starting line-up.

=== Narva Trans ===
On 13 June 2018, Halimi joined Meistriliiga side Narva Trans. On 21 August 2018, he made his debut with Narva Trans in the 2018–19 Estonian Cup third round against SK Kadrina after being named in the starting line-up. Seven days later, he made his first Meistriliiga appearance after coming on as a substitute at last minutes in place of Artur Kotenko in a 0–3 away win against Kuressaare.

=== Olimpik Donetsk ===
On 27 February 2019, Halimi signed a three-and-a-half-year contract with Ukrainian Premier League club Olimpik Donetsk and received squad number 12. Four days later, he made his debut in a 0–1 home defeat against Arsenal Kyiv after being named in the starting line-up.

=== Prishtina ===
On 10 August 2021, Halimi signed a three-year contract with Kosovo Superleague club Prishtina. Seven days later, he made his debut with Prishtina in the 2021 Kosovar Supercup against Llapi after being named in the starting line-up.

== International career ==
=== Under-21 ===
On 21 March 2017, Halimi received a call-up from Kosovo U21 for a 2019 UEFA European Under-21 Championship qualification match against Republic of Ireland U21, he was an unused substitute in that match.

=== Senior ===
On 23 December 2019, Halimi confirmed that he received a call-up from Kosovo for a friendly match against Sweden, but was unable to join the national team due to injury. On 17 March 2021, he received again a call-up from Kosovo for the friendly match against Lithuania and 2022 FIFA World Cup qualification matches against Sweden and Spain, but he was an unused substitute in these matches. His debut with Kosovo came on 11 June 2021 in a friendly match against Gambia after being named in the starting line-up.

== Career statistics ==
=== Club ===
As of 13 January 2022

Appearances and goals by club, season and competition
Club	Season	League			Cup		Other		Total	
Club	Season	Division	Apps	Goals	Apps	Goals	Apps	Goals	Apps	Goals
Drita	2015–16	Kosovo Superleague	15	0	4	0	—		19	0
Hajvalia	2016–17	Kosovo Superleague	3	0	0	0	—		3	0
Drita	2016–17	Kosovo Superleague	13	0	0	0	—		13	0
Drita	2017–18	Kosovo Superleague	9	0	0	0	—		9	0
Narva Trans	2018	Meistriliiga	7	0	2	0	—		9	0
Narva Trans	Total		47	0	6	0	—		53	0
Olimpik Donetsk	2018–19	Ukrainian Premier League	3	0	0	0	1 (Note: All appearance(s) in 2018–19 Ukrainian Premier League relegation round)	0	4	0
Olimpik Donetsk	2019–20	Ukrainian Premier League	4	0	0	0	2 (Note: All appearance(s) in 2019–20 Ukrainian Premier League relegation round)	0	6	0
Olimpik Donetsk	2020–21	Ukrainian Premier League	8	0	1	0	—		9	0
Olimpik Donetsk	Total		15	0	1	0	3	0	19	0
Prishtina	2021–22	Kosovo Superleague	16	0	1	0	1 (Note: Appearance in 2021 Kosovar Supercup)	0	18	0
Kukësi	2022–23	Kategoria Superiore	3	0	0	0	—		3	0
Career total			81	0	7	0	4	0	93	0
