= Andrii Chekotun =

Ukrainian footballer (born 2002)

Andriy Chekotun
Personal information
- Full name: Andriy Yuriiovych Chekotun
- Date of birth: 2 September 2002 (age 24)
- Place of birth: Vinnytsia, Ukraine
- Height: 1.85 m (6 ft 1 in)
- Position: Goalkeeper

Team information
- Current team: Ravshan Kulob
- Number: 25

Youth career
- 2013–2016: Youth Sportive School Vinnytsia
- 2016–2017: Shakhtar Donetsk
- 2017–2018: Piddubny Olympic College
- 2018–2020: Olimpik Donetsk

Senior career*
Years	Team	Apps	(Gls)
2020–2021	Olimpik Donetsk	3	(0)
2021	AFC Eskilstuna	0	(0)
2022–2024	Coruxo	19	(0)
2024–2025	Ibiza	1	(0)
2026–	Ravshan Kulob	1	(0)

International career^{‡}
2021	Ukraine U21	1	(0)
- * Club domestic league appearances and goals as of 16 March 2026 ‡ National team caps and goals as of 3 November 2021

Andrii Chekotun (Ukrainian: Андрій Юрійович Чекотун; born 2 September 2002) is a professional Ukrainian football goalkeeper for Tajikistan Higher League club Ravshan Kulob.

== Career ==
Chekotun was born in Vinnytsia, and began to play football in his native town, where he joined local youth sportive school. After that, he joined Shakhtar Donetsk academy in the age 13, where his first trainer was Volodymyr Savchenko. After he continued his football formation in RVUFK Kyiv and in the FC Olimpik Donetsk youth sportive school systems.

In September 2018 he was transferred to the Ukrainian Premier League side FC Olimpik and played for it in the Ukrainian Premier League Reserves and Under 19 Championship during one season. In December 2019 he was promoted to the main squad to play in the Ukrainian Premier League. Chekotun made his debut in the Ukrainian Premier League for FC Olimpik as a start squad player on 5 July 2020, playing in a losing home match against SC Dnipro-1.

On 7 August 2024, Chekotun joined Spanish club Ibiza.
