= Yevhen Troyanovskyi =

Ukrainian footballer

Personal information
- Full name: Yevhen Stanislavovych Troyanovskyi
- Date of birth: 2 July 1993 (age 33)
- Place of birth: Sloviansk, Ukraine
- Height: 1.75 m (5 ft 9 in)
- Position: Midfielder

Team information
- Current team: Carina Gubin

Youth career
- 2006–2007: Dynamo Kyiv
- 2007–2010: Metalurh Donetsk

Senior career*
Years	Team	Apps	(Gls)
2010–2015	Metalurh Donetsk	9	(0)
2014	→ Stal Alchevsk (loan)	10	(3)
2015	→ Chikhura Sachkhere (loan)	10	(2)
2015–2016	Dynamo Kyiv	0	(0)
2015–2016	→ Dynamo-2 Kyiv	25	(3)
2016–2018	Poltava	55	(12)
2018	Olimpik Donetsk	5	(0)
2019	Avanhard Kramatorsk	7	(0)
2019	→ Metalurh Zaporizhzhia (loan)	14	(0)
2020	Metalurh Zaporizhzhia	9	(0)
2020	Polissya Zhytomyr	9	(1)
2021	Kramatorsk	23	(0)
2022	Wisła Sandomierz	13	(2)
2024	Warta Gorzów Wielkopolski	0	(0)
2024	Lynx	9	(0)
2025–2026	TSU Jeging	7	(0)
2026	Jednota Bánová		
2026–	Carina Gubin	0	(0)

International career
2010	Ukraine U17	7	(0)
2011–2012	Ukraine U19	9	(0)
2013	Ukraine U21	3	(0)
- * Club domestic league appearances and goals as of 17:29, 15 September 2026 (UTC)

Yevhen Stanislavovych Troyanovskyi (Ukrainian: Євген Станіславович Трояновський; born 2 July 1993) is a Ukrainian professional footballer who plays as a midfielder for III liga club Carina Gubin.

== Career ==
Troyanovskyi is product of youth team systems of Dynamo Kyiv and Metalurh Donetsk. He made his debut for Metalurh entering as a second-half substitute against Vorskla Poltava on 27 October 2012 in Ukrainian Premier League.
