= Stanislav Sharay =

Ukrainian footballer

Personal information
- Full name: Stanislav Hennadiyovych Sharay
- Date of birth: 25 May 1997 (age 29)
- Place of birth: Romny, Ukraine
- Height: 1.75 m (5 ft 9 in)
- Position: Central midfielder

Team information
- Current team: Viktoriya Sumy
- Number: 25

Youth career
- 2011–2014: KODYuSSh Shchaslyve

Senior career*
Years	Team	Apps	(Gls)
2015–2019	Olimpik Donetsk	0	(0)
2018	→ Avanhard Kramatorsk (loan)	9	(0)
2018	→ Sumy (loan)	4	(0)
2019	Ryatuvalnyk Romny	0	(0)
2019–2022	Alians Lypova Dolyna	61	(14)
2022–2024	Veres Rivne	34	(3)
2024	→ Viktoriya Sumy (loan)	10	(0)
2024–	Viktoriya Sumy	44	(7)
- * Club domestic league appearances and goals as of 4 June 2026

Stanislav Hennadiyovych Sharay (Ukrainian: Станіслав Геннадійович Шарай; born 25 May 1997) is a Ukrainian professional footballer who plays as a central midfielder for Viktoriya Sumy.

== Career ==
=== Veres Rivne ===
On 9 July 2022 he signed for Veres Rivne.

== Personal life ==
He is the twin brother of Vladyslav Sharay who is also a footballer.
