= Oleksiy Hai =

Ukrainian retired footballer (born 1982)

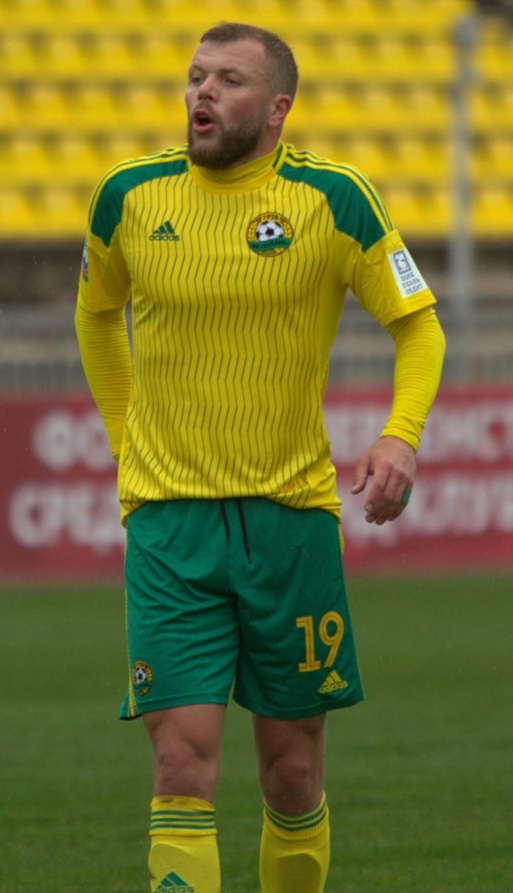
- Hai with Kuban in 2017

Personal information
- Full name: Oleksiy Anatoliyovych Hay
- Date of birth: 6 November 1982 (age 44)
- Place of birth: Zaporizhzhia, Ukrainian SSR (now Ukraine)
- Height: 1.82 m (6 ft 0 in)
- Position: Midfielder

Team information
- Current team: Chornomorets Odesa (assistant)

Senior career*
Years	Team	Apps	(Gls)
1998–1999	Viktor Zaporizhzhia	10	(0)
1999–2000	Metalurh-2 Zaporizhzhia	10	(2)
2000–2013	Shakhtar Donetsk	141	(14)
2000	→ Shakhtar-3 Donetsk	2	(0)
2000–2002	→ Shakhtar-2 Donetsk	39	(1)
2004–2006	→ Illichivets Mariupol (loan)	55	(11)
2013–2015	Chornomorets Odesa	38	(7)
2015–2016	Gabala	51	(14)
2016–2018	Kuban Krasnodar	63	(12)
2018–2019	Olimpik Donetsk	21	(3)
Total		430	(64)

International career^{‡}
2000	Ukraine U19	25	(3)
2001–2002	Ukraine U21	13	(1)
2002–2011	Ukraine	29	(1)

Managerial career
- 2021–: Chornomorets Odesa (assistant)
- * Club domestic league appearances and goals as of 28 June 2019 ‡ National team caps and goals as of 28 June 2019

Oleksiy Anatoliyovych Hai (Ukrainian: Олексій Анатолійович Гай; born 6 November 1982) is a Ukrainian retired professional footballer . He is currently an assistant manager at Chornomorets Odesa.

== Career ==
He made a political statement when in 2014 he refused to wear the "Glory to the Ukrainian Army" shirt which was imposed on all football players by the Ukraine Football Association.

On 5 January 2015, Hai signed an 18-month contract with Azerbaijan Premier League side Gabala FK.

On 5 August 2016, Hai signed a two-year contract with Russian National League side Kuban Krasnodar.

== Personal life ==
Oleksiy is the older brother of Ukrainian footballer Anton Hay.

== Career statistics ==
=== Club ===
Club	Season	League			Cup		Continental		Other		Total	
Club	Season	Division	Apps	Goals	Apps	Goals	Apps	Goals	Apps	Goals	Apps	Goals
Viktor Zaporizhzhia	1997–98	Ukrainian Second League	4	0	0	0	0	0	0	0	4	0
Viktor Zaporizhzhia	1998–99	Ukrainian Second League	6	0	1	0	0	0	0	0	7	0
Viktor Zaporizhzhia	Total		10	0	1	0	0	0	0	0	11	0
Metalurh-2 Zaporizhzhia	1999–2000	Ukrainian Second League	10	2	0	0	0	0	0	0	10	2
Metalurh-2 Zaporizhzhia	Total		10	2	0	0	0	0	0	0	10	2
Shakhtar Donetsk	2000–01	Ukrainian Premier League	3	0	0	0	0	0	0	0	3	0
Shakhtar Donetsk	2001–02	Ukrainian Premier League	7	1	2	0	0	0	0	0	9	1
Shakhtar Donetsk	2002–03	Ukrainian Premier League	29	5	4	0	4	0	0	0	37	5
Shakhtar Donetsk	2003–04	Ukrainian Premier League	15	2	2	0	6	0	0	0	23	2
Shakhtar Donetsk	2006–07	Ukrainian Premier League	18	1	6	0	5	0	0	0	29	1
Shakhtar Donetsk	2007–08	Ukrainian Premier League	14	2	4	2	0	0	1	0	19	4
Shakhtar Donetsk	2008–09	Ukrainian Premier League	16	2	5	0	9	0	0	0	30	2
Shakhtar Donetsk	2009–10	Ukrainian Premier League	13	1	2	0	8	3	0	0	23	4
Shakhtar Donetsk	2010–11	Ukrainian Premier League	11	0	1	0	6	0	0	0	18	0
Shakhtar Donetsk	2011–12	Ukrainian Premier League	9	0	4	0	0	0	0	0	13	0
Shakhtar Donetsk	2012–13	Ukrainian Premier League	6	0	2	1	0	0	0	0	8	1
Shakhtar Donetsk	Total		141	14	32	3	38	3	1	0	212	20
Shakhtar-3 Donetsk	2000–01	Ukrainian Second League	2	0	0	0	0	0	0	0	2	0
Shakhtar-3 Donetsk	Total		2	0	0	0	0	0	0	0	2	0
Shakhtar-2 Donetsk	2000–01	Ukrainian First League	18	0	0	0	0	0	0	0	18	0
Shakhtar-2 Donetsk	2001–02	Ukrainian First League	17	1	0	0	0	0	0	0	17	1
Shakhtar-2 Donetsk	2002–03	Ukrainian First League	2	0	0	0	0	0	0	0	2	0
Shakhtar-2 Donetsk	2003–04	Ukrainian First League	2	0	0	0	0	0	0	0	2	0
Shakhtar-2 Donetsk	Total		39	1	0	0	0	0	0	0	39	1
Illichivets Mariupol (loan)	2004–05	Ukrainian Premier League	26	3	3	1	2	0	0	0	31	4
Illichivets Mariupol (loan)	2005–06	Ukrainian Premier League	29	8	6	4	0	0	0	0	35	12
Illichivets Mariupol (loan)	Total		55	11	9	5	2	0	0	0	66	16
Chornomorets Odesa	2013–14	Ukrainian Premier League	25	3	2	0	13	3	1	0	41	6
Chornomorets Odesa	2014–15	Ukrainian Premier League	13	4	2	0	2	0	0	0	17	4
Chornomorets Odesa	Total		38	7	4	0	15	3	1	0	58	10
Gabala	2014–15	Azerbaijan Premier League	16	4	2	0	0	0	0	0	18	4
Gabala	2015–16	Azerbaijan Premier League	35	10	4	4	14	0	0	0	53	14
Gabala	Total		51	14	6	4	14	0	0	0	71	18
Kuban Krasnodar	2016–17	Russian Football National League	29	4	0	0	0	0	0	0	29	4
Kuban Krasnodar	2017–18	Russian Football National League	34	8	1	0	0	0	0	0	35	8
Kuban Krasnodar	Total		63	12	1	0	0	0	0	0	64	12
Olimpik Donetsk	2018–19	Ukrainian Premier League	21	3	1	1	0	0	0	0	22	4
Olimpik Donetsk	Total		21	3	1	1	0	0	0	0	22	4
Career total			430	64	54	13	69	6	2	0	555	83

=== International ===
Ukraine
Year	Apps	Goals
2003	1	0
2004	1	0
2005	0	0
2006	0	0
2007	6	0
2008	6	0
2009	8	1
2010	2	0
2011	5	0
Total	29	1

== Honours ==
Shakhtar Donetsk

- Ukrainian Premier League: 2001–02, 2007–08, 2009–10, 2010–11, 2011–12, 2012–13
- Ukrainian Cup: 2001–02, 2003–04, 2007–08, 2010–11, 2011–12, 2012–13
- UEFA Cup: 2008–09

Ukraine U19

- UEFA European Under-19 Championship runner-up: 2000
