= Vladyslav Sharay =

Ukrainian footballer (born 1997)

Personal information
- Full name: Vladyslav Hennadiyovych Sharay
- Date of birth: 25 May 1997 (age 29)
- Place of birth: Romny, Ukraine
- Height: 1.73 m (5 ft 8 in)
- Position: Left winger

Team information
- Current team: Veres Rivne
- Number: 77

Youth career
- 2011–2014: Knyazha Schaslyve

Senior career*
Years	Team	Apps	(Gls)
2015–2018	Olimpik Donetsk	0	(0)
2017–2018	→ Avanhard Kramatorsk (loan)	30	(3)
2018	→ Sumy (loan)	10	(0)
2019–2021	Alians Lypova Dolyna	45	(16)
2021–2022	Inhulets Petrove	15	(2)
2022	Alians Lypova Dolyna	0	(0)
2022–	Veres Rivne	113	(12)
- * Club domestic league appearances and goals as of 3 June 2026

Vladyslav Hennadiyovych Sharay (Ukrainian: Владислав Геннадійович Шарай; born 25 May 1997) is a Ukrainian professional footballer who plays as a left winger for Veres Rivne.

== Career ==
Sharay is a product of the FC Knyazha Schaslyve Youth Sportive School System.

He signed contract with FC Olimpik Donetsk in summer 2015 and played in the Ukrainian Premier League Reserves. In July 2017 he went on loan and made his debut for FC Avanhard Kramatorsk in the Ukrainian First League in a match against FC Inhulets Petrove on 15 July 2017.

On 9 July 2022 he signed for Veres Rivne.

== Personal life ==
He is the twin brother of Stanislav Sharay who is also a footballer.
