= Yehor Klymenchuk =

Ukrainian footballer

Personal information
- Full name: Yehor Oleksandrovych Klymenchuk
- Date of birth: 11 November 1997 (age 29)
- Place of birth: Zaporizhya, Ukraine
- Height: 1.80 m (5 ft 11 in)
- Position: Midfielder

Youth career
- 2010–2012: Shakhtar Donetsk
- 2012–2014: Metalurh Zaporizhya

Senior career*
| Years | Team | Apps | (Gls) |
| 2014–2015 | Metalurh Zaporizhya | 5 | (0) |
| 2016 | Minsk | 4 | (0) |
| 2016 | Naftan Novopolotsk | 3 | (0) |
| 2017 | Kolos Kovalivka | 7 | (0) |
| 2018 | Avanhard Kramatorsk | 5 | (0) |
| 2019 | Olimpik Donetsk | 9 | (0) |
| 2020 | Lviv | 19 | (0) |
| 2021–2022 | Ararat-Armenia | 23 | (0) |
| 2022 | Metalist Kharkiv | 9 | (0) |
- * Club domestic league appearances and goals as of 11 May 2023

Yehor Klymenchuk (Ukrainian: Єгор Олександрович Клименчук; born 11 November 1997) is a Ukrainian professional footballer who plays as a midfielder.

== Career ==
Klymenchuk is a product of FC Shakhtar and FC Metalurh Zaporizhya youth team systems.

He made his debut for Metalurh Zaporizhya in the Ukrainian Premier League in a match against FC Dynamo Kyiv on 30 May 2015.

On 3 June 2022, Ararat-Armenia announced that Klymenchuk's contract had expired and he would leave the club.

== Honours ==
=== Ararat-Armenia ===
- Armenian Premier League (1): Runner Up 2021–22
