= Matar Dieye =

Senegalese footballer

Personal information
- Date of birth: 10 January 1998 (age 28)
- Place of birth: Mbédiène, Senegal
- Height: 1.91 m (6 ft 3 in)
- Position: Forward

Team information
- Current team: Minsk
- Number: 9

Youth career
- 2014–2016: Sacilese
- 2016: → Vicenza (loan)
- 2016–2017: Vicenza
- 2017: Torino

Senior career*
Years	Team	Apps	(Gls)
2014–2016	Sacilese	1	(0)
2016	→ Vicenza (loan)	1	(0)
2017–2018	Tarxien Rainbows	7	(1)
2018–2019	Este	6	(0)
2019–2020	Olimpik Donetsk	23	(8)
2020	→ Karpaty Lviv (loan)	3	(1)
2020–2022	Gorica	55	(7)
2022–2023	Debrecen	1	(0)
2023	→ KuPS (loan)	3	(0)
2023	→ KuPS II (loan)	2	(1)
2023–2024	Bellinzona	16	(1)
2024–2025	Maghreb of Fez	12	(1)
2025	F.C. Kiryat Yam	3	(1)
2026–	Minsk	8	(2)
- * Club domestic league appearances and goals as of 6 July 2026

Matar Dieye (born 10 January 1998) is a Senegalese professional footballer who plays as a forward for Belarusian club Minsk.

== Career ==
Dieye started his career in Italian fourth-tier Serie D with Sacilese.

He made his Serie B debut for Vicenza on 23 April 2016 in a game against Spezia, as an 86th-minute substitute for Filip Raičević.

For the 2017-18 season, Dieye signed with Maltese Premier League club Tarxien Rainbows, contributing in seven league appearances and scoring once.

From 2018 to 2020, Dieye played in Ukrainian Premier League. First he signed with Olimpik Donetsk in the summer 2018. He spent one and half years with the club, before he was loaned out to fellow Ukrainian Premier League club Karpaty Lviv for the rest of the 2019-20 season.

After playing for two years for the Croatian team HNK Gorica, during which he scored 7 goals in 55 league appearances, the club and Dieye officially parted ways on August 1, 2022.

In March 2023, Dieye signed for KuPS on loan for the 2023 season with the option to buy. He made three league appearances with the first team, and additionally two appearances with the reserve team, but ultimately was unable to make an impact.

Dieye joined Bellinzona on 3 August 2023.

== Career statistics ==
As of 17 March 2025

Appearances and goals by club, season and competition
Club	Season	League			Cups (Note: Includes Maltese FA Trophy, Ukrainian Cup, Croatian Cup, Suomen Cup, Finnish League Cup and Swiss Cup)		Other		Total	
Club	Season	Division	Apps	Goals	Apps	Goals	Apps	Goals	Apps	Goals
Sacilese	2014–15	Serie D	1	0	–		–		1	0
Vicenza (loan)	2015–16	Serie B	1	0	–		–		1	0
Tarxien Rainbows	2017–18	Maltese Premier League	7	1	2	2	–		9	3
Este	2018–19	Serie D	6	0	–		–		6	0
Olimpik Donetsk	2018–19	Ukrainian Premier League	13	7	–		–		13	7
Olimpik Donetsk	2019–20	Ukrainian Premier League	10	1	0	0	–		10	1
Olimpik Donetsk	Total		23	8	0	0	–	–	23	8
Karpaty Lviv (loan)	2019–20	Ukrainian Premier League	3	1	–		–		3	1
Gorica	2020–21	1. HNL	30	5	4	1	–		34	6
Gorica	2021–22	1. HNL	25	2	4	2	–		29	4
Gorica	Total		55	7	8	3	–	–	63	10
Debrecen	2022–23	NB I	1	0	0	0	–		1	0
KuPS (loan)	2023	Veikkausliiga	3	0	0	0	0	0	3	0
KuPS II (loan)	2023	Kakkonen	2	1	–		–		2	1
Bellinzona	2023–24	Swiss Challenge League	16	1	3	1	–		19	2
Maghreb of Fez	2024–25	Botola Pro	12	1	0	0	1 (Note: Includes Moroccan Excellence Cup)	1	13	2
Career total			84	8	7	0	1	1	92	9
