= Hennadiy Pasich =

Ukrainian footballer

Personal information
- Full name: Hennadiy Anatoliyovych Pasich
- Date of birth: 13 July 1993 (age 33)
- Place of birth: Dniprodzerzhynsk, Ukraine
- Height: 1.76 m (5 ft 9 in)
- Position: Midfielder

Team information
- Current team: LNZ Cherkasy
- Number: 11

Youth career
- 2006: FC Enerhoyunior Dniprodzerzhynsk
- 2006–2010: FC Inter Dnipropetrovsk

Senior career*
Years	Team	Apps	(Gls)
2010–2014	Dnipro Dnipropetrovsk	0	(0)
2010–2011	→ Dnipro-2 Dnipropetrovsk	18	(1)
2014	→ Naftovyk-Ukrnafta Okhtyrka (loan)	10	(1)
2014–2017	Naftovyk-Ukrnafta Okhtyrka	82	(10)
2017	Veres Rivne	15	(1)
2018–2019	Olimpik Donetsk	40	(5)
2020	Karpaty Lviv	4	(0)
2020–2023	Veres Rivne	67	(11)
2023–	LNZ Cherkasy	87	(6)
- * Club domestic league appearances and goals as of 3 June 2026

Hennadiy Anatoliyovych Pasich (Ukrainian: Геннадій Анатолійович Пасіч; born 13 July 1993) is a Ukrainian professional footballer who plays as a midfielder for LNZ Cherkasy.

== Career ==
Pasich after playing for FC Dnipro reserves team and FC Dnipro-2 Dnipropetrovsk from January 2014 plays on loan for FC Naftovyk-Ukrnafta . On 29 August 2021 he scored against Desna Chernihiv in Ukrainian Premier League in the season 2021-22 at the Stadion Yuri Gagarin.

== Personal life ==
His twin brother Yevhen Pasich is also a professional footballer.
