= Vladyslav Helzin =

Ukrainian footballer (born 1973)

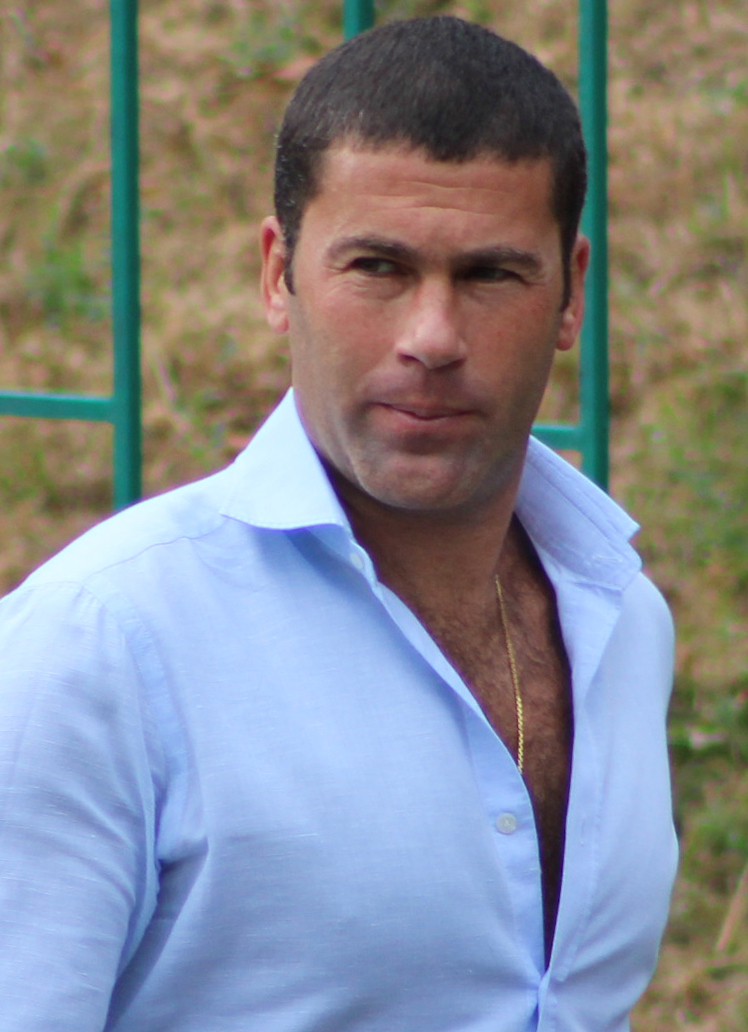

Personal information
- Full name: Vladyslav Hryhorovych Helzin
- Date of birth: 27 August 1973 (age 53)
- Place of birth: Donetsk, Soviet Union (now Ukraine)
- Height: 1.80 m (5 ft 11 in)
- Position: Striker

Senior career*
Years	Team	Apps	(Gls)
2000	Mashynobudivnyk Druzhkivka	0	(0)
2004–2016	Olimpik Donetsk	144	(23)
2018	Olimpik Donetsk	0	(0)

Managerial career
- 1999–2001: Metalurh Donetsk (vice-president)
- 2001–2021: Olimpik Donetsk (president)
- * Club domestic league appearances and goals

Vladyslav Hryhorovych Helzin (Ukrainian: Владислав Григорович Гельзін; born 27 August 1973) is a Ukrainian businessman, former footballer and football functionary. He is a former president of Olimpik Donetsk. In various media his last name also spells through Russian transliteration as Gelzin. On 10 May 2016, Helzin officially retired from professional sport. Owner of the Ukrainian chain of supermarkets "Pcholka"

== Career ==
Helzin is the only president out of all Ukrainian Premier League clubs in Ukraine, who was also a field team player. He played as a striker for Ukrainian Premier League club FC Olimpik Donetsk. In 2014 he received the title of Master of Sports of Ukraine in football

Helzin graduated from Donetsk State Institute of Health, Physical Education and Sport, in "Olympic and professional sports" and Donetsk National University, in "International Economics".

From 1999 to 2001 he served as vice-president of Metalurh Donetsk.

From 2001 to 2021 he served as president of Olimpik Donetsk.

== Personal life ==
He is married and has two daughters and a son.
