= Kostiantyn Trukhanov =

Ukrainian footballer and referee

- Full name: Kostiantyn Valeriyovych Trukhanov (Alyoshkin)
- Born: 3 January 1976 (age 50); Kharkiv, Ukraine SSR

Domestic
Years	League	Role
2012–	Ukrainian Premier League	Referee

International
Years	League	
Association football career
- Height: 1.80 m (5 ft 11 in)
- Position: Forward
Senior career*
Years	Team	Apps	(Gls)
1997	FC Avanhard Rovenky	2	(0)
1997	FC Khartsyzk	7	(4)
2000–2001	FC Monolit Kostiantynivka	15	(9)
2001–2002	FC Arsenal Kharkiv	33	(7)
2002	FC Desna Chernihiv	10	(0)
2002	FC Sokil Zolochiv	4	(0)
2004–2005	FC Helios Kharkiv	29	(2)
2005	FC Zhytychi Zhytomyr	11	(3)
2006	FC Hazovyk-KhGV Kharkiv	11	(0)
Total		122	(25)
Managerial career
- 2006–2008: SSSOR Metalist Kharkiv (assistant)
- * Club domestic league appearances and goals

Kostiantyn Valeriyovych Trukhanov (Alyoshkin) (Ukrainian: Костянтин Валерійович Труханов (Альошкін); born 3 January 1976) is a Ukrainian professional football referee and former footballer.

Sometimes in the 2000s he changed his surname from Alyoshkin to Trukhanov.
