= Dmytro Hryshko =

Ukrainian footballer

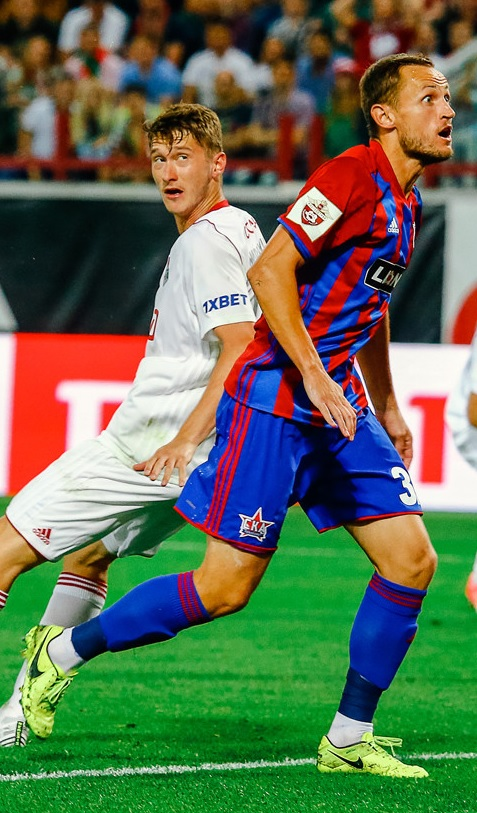
- Hryshko (R) with SKA-Khabarovsk in 2017

Personal information
- Full name: Dmytro Serhiyovych Hryshko
- Date of birth: 2 December 1985 (age 40)
- Place of birth: Horlivka, Ukrainian SSR
- Height: 1.82 m (6 ft 0 in)
- Position: Centre-back

Team information
- Current team: Denhoff Denykhivka

Youth career
- 1994–2001: Spartak Horlivka
- 2002: Shakhtar Donetsk

Senior career*
Years	Team	Apps	(Gls)
2004–2011	Chornomorets Odesa	122	(3)
2004	→ Chornomorets-2 Odesa	7	(0)
2011	→ Chornomorets-2 Odesa	3	(0)
2011–2017	Olimpik Donetsk	137	(8)
2017–2018	SKA-Khabarovsk	16	(0)
2018–2021	Olimpik Donetsk	55	(1)
2022–	Denhoff Denykhivka	0	(0)
Total		340	(12)

International career^{‡}
2005	Ukraine U21	2	(0)

Managerial career
- 2021: Olimpik Donetsk (assistant)
- * Club domestic league appearances and goals as of 16 January 2021 ‡ National team caps and goals as of 9 July 2017

Dmytro Serhiyovych Hryshko (Ukrainian: Дмитро Сергійович Гришко; born 2 December 1985) is a Ukrainian amateur and retired professional footballer who plays as a centre-back for Denhoff Denykhivka. He played most notably for Chornomorets Odesa and Olimpik Donetsk.

== Career ==
Hryshko is a product of his native Spartak Horlivka, where his first trainer was Yuriy Fomenko.

He joined FC Chornomorets Odesa in the 2004 and made his Ukrainian Premier League debut against FC Metalist Kharkiv on 1 March 2005. Prior to the 2010–11 season, Hryshko was elected the vice-captain of Chornomorets.

=== Career statistics ===
As of 8 December 2017

Club	Season	League			Cup		Continental		Total	
Club	Season	Division	Apps	Goals	Apps	Goals	Apps	Goals	Apps	Goals
FC Chornomorets Odesa	2004–05	Vyshcha Liha	14	0	0	0	–		14	0
FC Chornomorets Odesa	2005–06	Vyshcha Liha	17	0	2	0	–		19	0
FC Chornomorets Odesa	2006–07	Vyshcha Liha	0	0	1	0	0	0	1	0
FC Chornomorets Odesa	2007–08	Vyshcha Liha	18	2	1	0	4	1	23	3
FC Chornomorets Odesa	2008–09	Premier League	25	0	1	0	–		26	0
FC Chornomorets Odesa	2009–10	Premier League	28	1	1	0	–		29	1
FC Chornomorets Odesa	2010–11	Persha Liha	19	0	2	0	–		21	0
FC Chornomorets Odesa	Total		127	3	8	0	4	1	139	4
FC Chornomorets-2 Odesa	2003–04	Second League	8	0	–		–		8	0
FC Chornomorets-2 Odesa	2010–11	Second League	4	0	–		–		4	0
FC Chornomorets-2 Odesa	Total		12	0	0	0	0	0	12	0
FC Olimpik Donetsk	2011–12	Persha Liha	19	0	0	0	–		19	0
FC Olimpik Donetsk	2012–13	Persha Liha	29	2	1	0	–		30	2
FC Olimpik Donetsk	2013–14	Persha Liha	23	2	1	0	–		24	2
FC Olimpik Donetsk	2014–15	Premier League	22	1	6	0	–		28	1
FC Olimpik Donetsk	2015–16	Premier League	21	1	2	0	–		23	1
FC Olimpik Donetsk	2016–17	Premier League	23	2	1	0	–		24	2
FC Olimpik Donetsk	Total		137	8	11	0	0	0	148	8
FC SKA-Khabarovsk	2017–18	Premier League	11	0	1	0	–		12	0
Career total			287	11	20	0	4	1	311	12
