= Vitaliy Balashov =

Ukrainian footballer (born 1991)

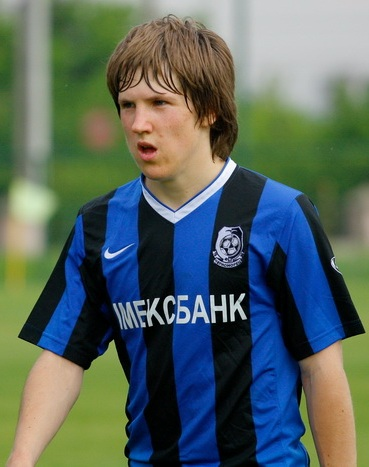

Personal information
- Full name: Vitaliy Yuriyovych Balashov
- Date of birth: 15 January 1991 (age 35)
- Place of birth: Odesa, Ukrainian SSR, Soviet Union
- Height: 1.72 m (5 ft 8 in)
- Position: Forward

Team information
- Current team: Athletic Club Odesa

Youth career
- 2004–2008: Chornomorets Odesa Youth

Senior career*
Years	Team	Apps	(Gls)
2008–2016	Chornomorets Odesa	98	(12)
2010	Chornomorets-2 Odesa	1	(0)
2013	→ Hoverla Uzhhorod (loan)	10	(1)
2016	Wisła Kraków	8	(0)
2016	Wisła Kraków II	6	(7)
2017	Milsami Orhei	10	(4)
2017	Isloch Minsk Raion	8	(1)
2018–2020	Olimpik Donetsk	49	(5)
2020	Tambov	6	(0)
2021	Shakhter Karagandy	13	(2)
2021–2022	Aktobe	29	(3)
2023	Turan	7	(3)
2023	Tytan Odesa	11	(5)
2024	Shturm Ivankiv	3	(0)
2024	Tytan Odesa	4	(4)
2024–	Athletic Club Odesa		

International career
2006–2007	Ukraine U16	14	(4)
2007–2008	Ukraine U17	9	(1)
2008–2009	Ukraine U18	3	(1)
2012	Ukraine U21	2	(0)
- * Club domestic league appearances and goals as of 6 January 2025

Vitaliy Balashov (Ukrainian: Віталій Юрійович Балашов; born 15 January 1991) is a Ukrainian professional footballer who plays as a forward for Athletic Club Odesa.

== Career ==
He is a product of the Chornomorets Odesa Youth academy and has played for both the reserve squad and youth squad.

In 2016, he played for Wisła Kraków in the Polish Ekstraklasa.

On 4 August 2020, he signed a two-year contract with Russian Premier League club FC Tambov. His Tambov contract was terminated on 9 October.

On 2 March 2021, he signed a contract with Kazakhstan Premier League club FC Shakhter Karagandy, but his contract was terminated just three months later.
