= Darlington Igwekali =

Nigerian association football player

Personal information
- Full name: Darlington Emmanuel Igwekali
- Date of birth: 4 April 2000 (age 26)
- Place of birth: Nigeria
- Height: 1.90 m (6 ft 3 in)
- Position: Defender

Team information
- Current team: Al-Kadhimiya
- Number: 37

Youth career
- –2019: Alanyaspor
- 2019: Olimpik Donetsk

Senior career*
Years	Team	Apps	(Gls)
2020–2021	Ajman	19	(0)
2021–2022	Fujairah	22	(0)
2022–2023	Emirates	31	(3)
2024	Al Rams	0	(0)
2024–2025	Dubai City		
2025–	Al-Kadhimiya		
- * Club domestic league appearances and goals

Darlington Igwekali (born 4 April 2000) is a Nigerian professional footballer who plays for Al-Kadhimiya as a defender.

== Career statistics ==
=== Club ===
As of 29 December 2020.

Club	Season	League			Cup		Continental		Other		Total	
Club	Season	Division	Apps	Goals	Apps	Goals	Apps	Goals	Apps	Goals	Apps	Goals
Ajman Club	2020–21	UAE Pro League	17	0	1	0	0	0	0	0	17	0
Career total			16	0	1	0	0	0	0	0	17	0
