= Yevhen Pasich =

Ukrainian footballer

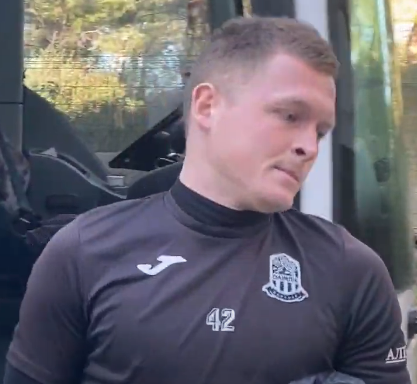

Personal information
- Full name: Yevhen Anatoliyovych Pasich
- Date of birth: 13 July 1993 (age 33)
- Place of birth: Dniprodzerzhynsk, Ukraine
- Height: 1.77 m (5 ft 10 in)
- Position: Midfielder

Team information
- Current team: Kudrivka
- Number: 42

Youth career
- 2006: Enerhoyunior Dniprodzerzhynsk
- 2006–2010: Inter Dnipropetrovsk

Senior career*
Years	Team	Apps	(Gls)
2010–2014	Dnipro Dnipropetrovsk	0	(0)
2010–2011	→ Dnipro-2 Dnipropetrovsk	19	(1)
2014	→ Naftovyk-Ukrnafta Okhtyrka	8	(2)
2014–2017	Naftovyk-Ukrnafta Okhtyrka	75	(3)
2017	Veres Rivne	12	(1)
2018–2021	Olimpik Donetsk	75	(5)
2021–2022	Veres Rivne	27	(1)
2023–2024	Dnipro-1	31	(0)
2024–2026	Metalist 1925 Kharkiv	8	(0)
2025	→ Vorskla Poltava (loan)	3	(0)
2025	→ Obolon Kyiv (loan)	8	(0)
2026–	Kudrivka	11	(0)
- * Club domestic league appearances and goals as of 7 November 2026

Yevhen Anatoliyovych Pasich (Ukrainian: Євген Анатолійович Пасіч; born 13 July 1993) is a Ukrainian professional footballer who plays as a midfielder for Kudrivka.

== Career ==
Pasich began his career with FC Dnipro-2 Dnipropetrovsk.

On 4 January 2023 he moved to Dnipro-1.

On 13 July 2026 he signed for Kudrivka in Ukrainian Premier League.

== Personal life ==
He has a twin brother Hennadiy Pasich, who is also a professional footballer.
