= Serhiy Politylo =

Ukrainian footballer

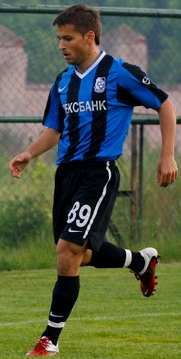

Personal information
- Full name: Serhiy Olehovych Politylo
- Date of birth: 9 January 1989 (age 37)
- Place of birth: Novovolynsk, Ukraine, Soviet Union
- Height: 1.65 m (5 ft 5 in)
- Position: Midfielder

Team information
- Current team: Chornomorets Odesa (assistant coach)

Youth career
- 2002–2005: RVUFK Kyiv
- 2005: Vidradnyi Kyiv
- 2005–2006: RVUFK Kyiv

Senior career*
| Years | Team | Apps | (Gls) |
| 2006–2013 | Chornomorets Odesa | 99 | (7) |
| 2008 | → Dnister Ovidiopol (loan) | 12 | (1) |
| 2013–2016 | Dnipro Dnipropetrovsk | 37 | (0) |
| 2015–2016 | → Volyn Lutsk (loan) | 27 | (1) |
| 2017 | Okzhetpes | 12 | (0) |
| 2017 | Chornomorets Odesa | 17 | (0) |
| 2018 | Adana Demirspor | 9 | (0) |
| 2018–2021 | Olimpik Donetsk | 74 | (9) |
| 2021–2022 | Lviv | 18 | (0) |
| 2022–2023 | Chornomorets Odesa | 24 | (0) |
| 2023–2024 | Tytan Odesa (amateur) | | |

International career
| 2004–2005 | Ukraine U16 | 15 | (0) |
| 2005–2006 | Ukraine U17 | 8 | (0) |
| 2006 | Ukraine U18 | 2 | (0) |
| 2007–2008 | Ukraine U19 | 17 | (1) |

Managerial career
- 2026–: Chornomorets Odesa (assistant)
- * Club domestic league appearances and goals as of 14 February 2026

Serhiy Olehovych Politylo (Ukrainian: Сергій Олегович Політило; born 9 January 1989) is a Ukrainian professional football coach and a former midfielder. He is an assistant coach with Chornomorets Odesa.

== Career ==
He was promoted to the senior side from Chornomorets Reserves in November 2006. Politylo started most of the official matches as captain of the FC Chornomorets in the 2011–12 season.

On 1 July 2022, Politylo has left FC Lviv and joined Chornomores Odesa for the third time in his career.
