= Illya Tymoshenko =

Ukrainian footballer

Personal information
- Full name: Illya Oleksandrovych Tymoshenko
- Date of birth: 7 March 1999 (age 27)
- Place of birth: Korostyshiv, Ukraine
- Height: 1.90 m (6 ft 3 in)
- Position: Defender

Team information
- Current team: Nevėžis
- Number: 18

Youth career
- –2016: RVUFK Kyiv

Senior career*
Years	Team	Apps	(Gls)
2017–2018	Volyn Lutsk	9	(0)
2018–2019	Olimpik Donetsk	0	(0)
2019–2020	Polissya Zhytomyr	16	(0)
2021	Hirnyk-Sport Horishni Plavni	9	(1)
2021	Lyubomyr Stavyshche	9	(0)
2022	Ústí nad Labem	13	(2)
2022–2024	KSZO Ostrowiec Świętokrzyski	35	(2)
2024–2025	Klimontowianka Klimontów	13	(5)
2025–	Nevėžis		
- * Club domestic league appearances and goals as of 19:56, 18 June 2025 (UTC)

Illya Oleksandrovych Tymoshenko (Ukrainian: Ілля Олександрович Тимошенко; born 7 March 1999) is a Ukrainian professional footballer who plays as a defender for Lithuanian club Nevėžis.

== Club career ==
He made his Ukrainian First League debut for FC Volyn Lutsk on 30 July 2017 in a game against FC Avanhard Kramatorsk.

== Honours ==
KSZO Ostrowiec

- Polish Cup (Świętokrzyskie regionals): 2022–23
