= Roman Vantukh =

Ukrainian footballer

Personal information
- Full name: Roman Romanovych Vantukh
- Date of birth: 4 July 1998 (age 28)
- Place of birth: Novosilky-Hostynni, Lviv Oblast, Ukraine
- Height: 1.76 m (5 ft 9 in)
- Position: Left-back

Team information
- Current team: Zorya Luhansk
- Number: 47

Youth career
- 2011–2015: Lviv
- 2014: → Demnya (loan)

Senior career*
Years	Team	Apps	(Gls)
2015–2022	Dynamo Kyiv	0	(0)
2019	→ Olimpik Donetsk (loan)	22	(2)
2020–2021	→ Oleksandriya (loan)	24	(1)
2021	→ Chornomorets Odesa (loan)	9	(0)
2022	→ Dnipro-1 (loan)	0	(0)
2022	→ Zorya Luhansk (loan)	2	(1)
2022–	Zorya Luhansk	90	(6)

International career^{‡}
2015	Ukraine U18	1	(0)
2018–2020	Ukraine U21	9	(1)
- * Club domestic league appearances and goals as of 3 June 2026 ‡ National team caps and goals as of 1 September 2022

Roman Romanovych Vantukh (Ukrainian: Роман Романович Вантух; born 4 July 1998) is a Ukrainian professional football player who plays as a left-back for Zorya Luhansk.

== Club career ==
He made his Ukrainian Premier League debut for Olimpik Donetsk on 23 February 2019 in a game against Mariupol.
