= Volodymyr Krynskyi =

Ukrainian footballer

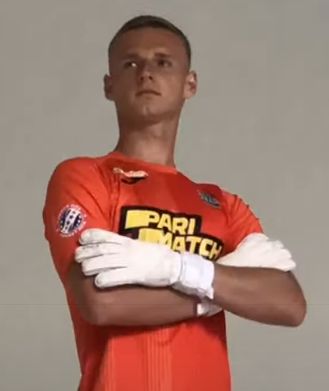

Personal information
- Full name: Volodymyr Viktorovych Krynskyi
- Date of birth: 14 January 1997 (age 29)
- Place of birth: Chkalovske, Ukraine
- Height: 1.92 m (6 ft 4 in)
- Position: Goalkeeper

Team information
- Current team: FK Banga
- Number: 14

Youth career
- 2010–2014: UFK-Olimpik Kharkiv

Senior career*
Years	Team	Apps	(Gls)
2014–2018	Poltava	37	(0)
2018–2020	Olimpik Donetsk	32	(0)
2020–2021	Inhulets Petrove	11	(0)
2021–2022	Volyn Lutsk	0	(0)
2022	Podillya Khmelnytskyi	0	(0)
2022–2024	Prostějov	13	(0)
2024–2025	Dainava	42	(0)
2026–	Banga	22	(0)
- * Club domestic league appearances and goals as of 20 July 2026

Volodymyr Viktorovych Krynskyi (Ukrainian: Володимир Вікторович Кринський; born 14 January 1997) is a Ukrainian professional footballer who plays as a goalkeeper.

== Career ==
Krynskyi is a product of UFK-Olimpik Kharkiv youth sportive system. In 2014, he signed contract with FC Poltava in the Ukrainian First League and made his debut in match against FC Kolos Kovalivka on 8 October 2016.

On 2 July 2018, he signed 3-year contract with Ukrainian Premier League club Olimpik Donetsk after the dissolution of FC Poltava.
