= Andriy Kravchuk =

Ukrainian footballer

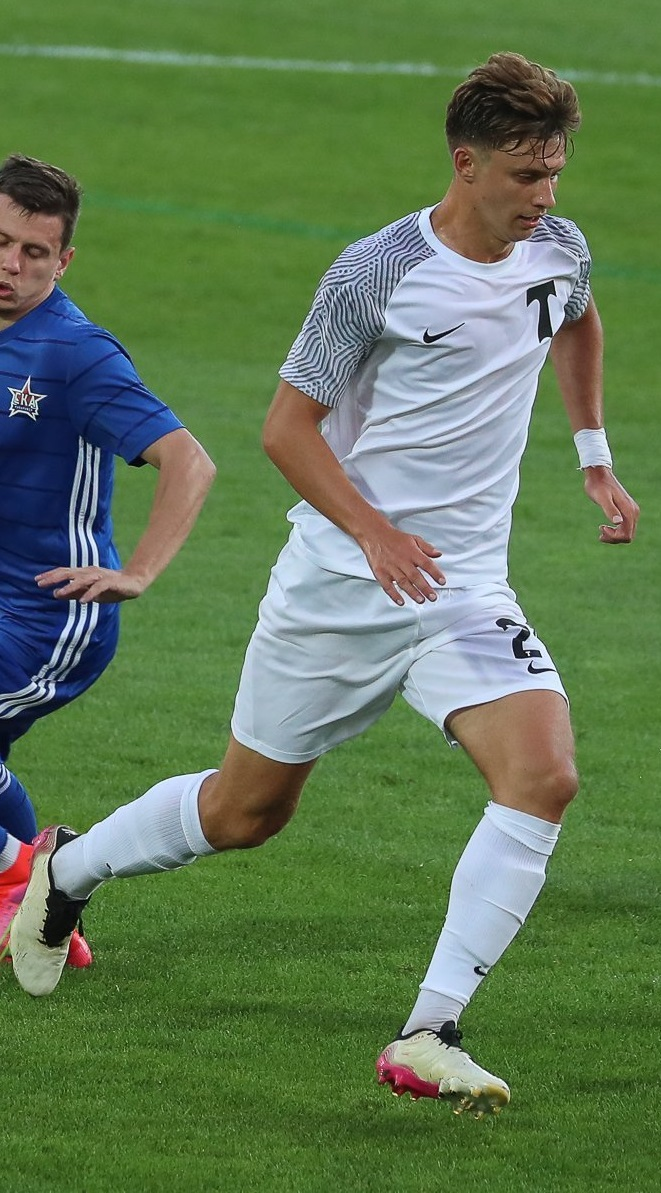
- Kravchuk with Torpedo Moscow in 2021

Personal information
- Full name: Andriy Serhiyovych Kravchuk
- Date of birth: 26 February 1999 (age 27)
- Place of birth: Chernivtsi, Ukraine
- Height: 1.87 m (6 ft 2 in)
- Position: Midfielder

Team information
- Current team: Ethnikos Achna
- Number: 21

Youth career
- 2009: Kyiv
- 2010: Dynamo Kyiv
- 2012–2016: Shakhtar Donetsk

Senior career*
Years	Team	Apps	(Gls)
2016–2017	Shakhtar Donetsk	0	(0)
2018–2020	Olimpik Donetsk	28	(2)
2021–2022	Torpedo Moscow	32	(0)
2022–2023	Vorskla Poltava	5	(1)
2023	Cork City	9	(0)
2024	Urartu	26	(1)
2025–	Ethnikos Achna	0	(0)

International career^{‡}
2019–2020	Ukraine U-21	4	(0)
- * Club domestic league appearances and goals as of 1 July 2025 ‡ National team caps and goals as of 17 August 2023

Andriy Serhiyovych Kravchuk (Ukrainian: Андрій Сергійович Кравчук; born 26 February 1999) is a Ukrainian professional footballer. He plays for Ethnikos Achna.

== Club career ==
He made his debut in the Ukrainian Premier League for Olimpik Donetsk on 21 October 2018 in a game against Chornomorets Odesa.

He made his debut in the Russian Football National League for Torpedo Moscow on 14 March 2021 in a game against Yenisey Krasnoyarsk.

Following the 2022 Russian invasion of Ukraine, Kravchuk sought refuge in England, and was granted permission to train with Manchester City.

After spending a season back in Ukraine with Voskla Poltava, it was announced on 17 August 2023, that he had signed for League of Ireland Premier Division club Cork City.

On 25 January 2024, Armenian Premier League club Urartu announced the signing of Kravchuk.

== International career ==
Kravchuk has played for Ukraine at under-17 and under-21 levels.
