= List of Ukrainian football transfers winter 2018–19 =

This is a list of Ukrainian football transfers winter 2018–19. Only clubs in 2018–19 Ukrainian Premier League and 2018–19 Ukrainian First League are included.

== Ukrainian Premier League ==
=== Arsenal Kyiv ===
In:

No.	Pos.	Nation	Player
—		UKR	Ihor Leonov (from (Ukraine) FC Mariupol)
—	GK	UKR	Roman Pidkivka (from (Ukraine) Karpaty Lviv)
—	GK	IRI	Peyman Salehiserwak
—	DF	UKR	Maksym Zhychykov (from (Finland) Kokkolan Palloveikot)
—	DF	UKR	Serhiy Vakulenko (on loan from (Ukraine) Shakhtar Donetsk)
—	MF	IRI	Alireza Akbari
—	MF	UKR	Artur Avahimyan (from (Ukraine) FC Mariupol)
—	MF	UKR	Dmytro Bashlay (from (Ukraine) SC Dnipro-1)
—	MF	GEO	Jaba Lipartia (from (Georgia (country)) FC Samtredia)
—	MF	ARM	Gegham Kadymyan (from (Ukraine) Vorskla Poltava)
—	MF	UKR	Vladyslav Kalitvintsev (from (Ukraine) Dynamo Kyiv)
—	MF	UKR	Mykhailo Mudryk (on loan from (Ukraine) Shakhtar Donetsk)
—	MF	UKR	Vyacheslav Tankovskyi (on loan from (Ukraine) Shakhtar Donetsk)
—	FW	UKR	Oleksandr Kovpak (from (Ukraine) Desna Chernihiv)
—	FW	GAB	Gaëtan Missi Mezu (from (Romania) Dunărea Călărași)

Out:

No.	Pos.	Nation	Player
—		UKR	Vyacheslav Hroznyi
—	GK	UKR	Serhiy Sitalo (to (Ukraine) Kolos Kovalivka)
—	DF	TOG	Serge Akakpo (to (Turkey) Elazığspor)
—	DF	UKR	Serhiy Datsenko (retired)
—	DF	UKR	Danylo Karas
—	DF	UKR	Oleksiy Larin (to (Tajikistan) Istiklol)
—	DF	UKR	Oleksiy Maydanevych (to (Georgia (country)) Shevardeni-1906 Tbilisi)
—	DF	UKR	Oleksandr Nasonov (to (Ukraine) FC Lviv)
—	DF	ARG	Oscar Piris (to (Uruguay) Torque)
—	DF	UKR	Dmytro Zozulya (to (Ukraine) Hirnyk-Sport Horishni Plavni)
—	MF	UKR	Yuriy Bushman (to (Lithuania) Kauno Žalgiris)
—	MF	UKR	Serhiy Hryn (loan return to (Ukraine) Shakhtar Donetsk)
—	MF	UKR	Maksym Pryadun
—	MF	COD	Aurélien Ngeyitala (to (Bulgaria) FC Vereya)
—	FW	UKR	Leonid Akulinin
—	MF	UKR	Oleksandr Yermachenko (to (Georgia (country)) Shevardeni-1906 Tbilisi)
—	FW	UKR	Maksym Feshchuk (to (Belarus) FC Vitebsk)
—	FW	ITA	Massimo N'Cede Goh (loan return to (Italy) Juventus)

=== Chornomorets Odesa ===
In:

No.	Pos.	Nation	Player
—	DF	UKR	Oleksandr Holikov (from (Ukraine) FC Lviv)
—	MF	UKR	Volodymyr Arzhanov (from (Kazakhstan) Kaysar Kyzylorda)
—	MF	UKR	Vitaliy Hoshkoderya (from (Kazakhstan) Okzhetpes)
—	MF	UKR	Yevhen Morozenko (free agent)
—	MF	UKR	Volodymyr Tanchyk (from (Poland) Stomil Olsztyn)
—	FW	RUS	Vasili Pavlov (from (Latvia) Ventspils)
—	FW	ISL	Árni Vilhjálmsson (on loan from (Poland) Termalica Nieciecza)

Out:

No.	Pos.	Nation	Player
—	GK	UKR	Dmytro Bezruk (to (Azerbaijan) Sabah)
—	DF	UKR	Maksym Demchuk (to (Ukraine) Nyva Ternopil)
—	DF	UKR	Oleh Sokolov (to (Ukraine) FC Oleksandriya)
—	MF	UKR	Artur Karnoza (to (Ukraine) FC Mynai)
—	MF	UKR	Vladyslav Khomutov (to (Slovakia) ViOn Zlaté Moravce)
—	MF	UKR	Dmytro Leonov
—	MF	UKR	Yuriy Romanyuk (to (Ukraine) SC Dnipro-1)
—	MF	UKR	Oleksiy Savchenko (to (Ukraine) Polissya Zhytomyr)
—	MF	UKR	Yevhen Smirnov (to (Belarus) Gomel)
—	FW	UKR	Anatoliy Didenko
—	FW	NED	Robert Mutzers (to (Netherlands) Kozakken Boys)
—	FW	UKR	Mykyta Tatarkov (to (Belarus) Shakhtyor Soligorsk)

=== Desna Chernihiv ===
In:

No.	Pos.	Nation	Player
—	GK	UKR	Serhii Melashenko (loan return from (Ukraine) FC Mynai)
—	DF	UKR	Dmytro Nyemchaninov (from (Russia) Krylia Sovetov Samara)
—	DF	UKR	Temur Partsvania (from (Hungary) Kisvárda)
—	MF	UKR	Andriy Bohdanov (from (Poland) Arka Gdynia)
—	MF	UKR	Vadym Bovtruk (loan return from (Ukraine) PFC Sumy)
—	MF	UKR	Illya Kovalenko (loan return from (Ukraine) Inhulets Petrove)
—	MF	UKR	Mykhaylo Kozak (from (Ukraine) Rukh Vynnyky)
—	MF	UKR	Renat Mochulyak
—	FW	UKR	Mykhaylo Serhiychuk (from (Ukraine) Vorskla Poltava)

Out:

No.	Pos.	Nation	Player
—	GK	UKR	Serhii Melashenko (to (Ukraine) Hirnyk Kryvyi Rih)
—	DF	UKR	Anton Bratkov (to (Israel) Maccabi Petah Tikva)
—	DF	UKR	Vitaliy Yermakov (on loan to (Ukraine) Avanhard Kramatorsk)
—	MF	UKR	Maksym Banasevych (on loan to (Ukraine) Kolos Kovalivka)
—	MF	GEO	Luka Koberidze (to (Ukraine) Metalist 1925 Kharkiv)
—	MF	UKR	Illya Kovalenko (to (Ukraine) Inhulets Petrove)
—	FW	UKR	Oleksandr Kovpak (to (Ukraine) Arsenal Kyiv)

=== Dynamo Kyiv ===
In:

No.	Pos.	Nation	Player
—	DF	GEO	Luka Lochoshvili (loan return from (Georgia (country)) Dinamo Tbilisi)
—	DF	NGR	Joseph Okoro
—	MF	URU	Carlos de Pena (from (Uruguay) Nacional)
—	MF	BLR	Nikita Korzun (loan return from (Belarus) Dinamo Minsk)
—	FW	ESP	Fran Sol (from (Netherlands) Willem II)

Out:

No.	Pos.	Nation	Player
—	DF	GEO	Luka Lochoshvili (on loan to (Slovakia) MŠK Žilina)
—	DF	UKR	Mykola Morozyuk (on loan to (Turkey) Rizespor)
—	DF	UKR	Zurab Ochigava (on loan to (Ukraine) SC Dnipro-1)
—	DF	SRB	Aleksandar Pantić (on loan to (Spain) Cádiz)
—	MF	BRA	Vitor Bueno (loan return to (Brazil) Santos)
—	MF	UKR	Vladyslav Kalitvintsev (to (Ukraine) Arsenal Kyiv)
—	MF	UKR	Dmytro Kopytov ((on loan?) to (Ukraine) Avanhard Kramatorsk)
—	MF	BLR	Nikita Korzun (on loan to (Saudi Arabia) Al-Fateh)
—	MF	BRA	Tchê Tchê (to (Brazil) São Paulo)
—	MF	UKR	Roman Vantukh (on loan to (Ukraine) Olimpik Donetsk)
—	FW	UKR	Artem Khotsyanovskyi ((on loan?) to (Ukraine) Avanhard Kramatorsk)

=== Karpaty Lviv ===
In:

No.	Pos.	Nation	Player
—		ESP	Fabriciano González Penelas (from (Spain) Lorca FC)
—	DF	CMR	Martin Hongla (on loan from (Spain) Granada B)
—	DF	UKR	Andriy Markovych (loan return from (Estonia) Nõmme Kalju)
—	DF	GEO	Nika Sandokhadze (loan return from (Latvia) Rīgas Futbola Skola)
—	DF	UKR	Nazar Stasyshyn (loan return from (Ukraine) Volyn Lutsk)
—	MF	UKR	Andriy Busko (loan return from (Ukraine) Rukh Vynnyky)
—	MF	UKR	Yuriy Tkachuk (loan return from (Estonia) Levadia Tallinn)
—	MF	FRA	Karim Yoda (from (Spain) CF Reus Deportiu)
—	FW	UKR	Roman Debelko (loan return from (Estonia) Levadia Tallinn)
—	FW	UKR	Yaroslav Deda (free agent)
—	FW	UKR	Viktor Khomchenko (from (Ukraine) Avanhard Kramatorsk)
—	FW	UKR	Andriy Remenyuk (loan return from (Ukraine) Rukh Vynnyky)
—	FW	NGR	Enete Kosisochukwu Joseph
—	FW	UKR	Maryan Shved (on loan from (Scotland) Celtic)
—	FW	UKR	Volodymyr Voytovych (loan return from (Ukraine) Rukh Vynnyky)

Out:

No.	Pos.	Nation	Player
—	GK	UKR	Roman Pidkivka (to (Ukraine) Arsenal Kyiv)
—	GK	UKR	Mykyta Shevchenko (loan return to (Ukraine) Shakhtar Donetsk)
—	DF	UKR	Oleh Boroday (to (Poland) Górnik Łęczna)
—	DF	UKR	Orest Lebedenko (to (Spain) Lugo)
—	DF	UKR	Andriy Markovych (to (Estonia) Nõmme Kalju)
—	DF	UKR	Oleh Veremiyenko (on loan to (Ukraine) Kalush)
—	MF	COL	Jorge Carrascal (on loan to (Argentina) River Plate)
—	MF	ARG	Cristian Erbes (to (Paraguay) Club Nacional)
—	MF	UKR	Oleh Holodyuk (to (Hungary) Szombathelyi Haladás)
—	MF	UKR	Yuriy Tkachuk (to (Estonia) Levadia Tallinn)
—	MF	UKR	Nazar Verbnyi (on loan to (Ukraine) Rukh Vynnyky)
—	FW	COL	Yhonatan Bedoya
—	FW	UKR	Viktor Khomchenko
—	FW	ARG	Catriel Sánchez (loan return to (Argentina) Talleres)
—	FW	UKR	Maryan Shved (to (Scotland) Celtic)
—	FW	UKR	Danylo Sikan (to (Ukraine) Shakhtar Donetsk)
—	FW	BOL	Rodrigo Vargas

=== Lviv ===
In:

No.	Pos.	Nation	Player
—		UKR	Vitaliy Shpanyuk
—	DF	UKR	Dmytro Fatyeyev (free agent)
—	DF	UKR	Oleksandr Nasonov (from (Ukraine) Arsenal Kyiv)
—	MF	BRA	Pedro Vitor (from (Greece) Aris Thessaloniki)
—	MF	BRA	Lipe Veloso (from (Japan) FC Tokyo)
—	MF	BRA	Vicente (free agent)
—	MF	BRA	Cadina (from (Brazil) Barretos)
—	FW	BRA	Alvaro (free agent)
—	FW	NGR	Adel Babatunde
—	FW	BRA	China (free agent)
—	FW	BRA	Kauê (on loan from (Brazil) Palmeiras)
—	FW	BRA	Pernambuco

Out:

No.	Pos.	Nation	Player
—	DF	UKR	Bohdan Druz (to (Ukraine) PFC Sumy)
—	DF	UKR	Vasyl Bilyi
—	DF	UKR	Semen Datsenko (to (Ukraine) Podillya Khmelnytskyi)
—	DF	UKR	Volodymyr Domnitsak
—	DF	UKR	Dmytro Fatyeyev
—	DF	UKR	Oleksandr Holikov (to (Ukraine) Chornomorets Odesa)
—	DF	UKR	Yuriy Putrash (to (Ukraine) FC Mynai)
—	DF	BRA	Lucas Taylor (loan return to (Brazil) Palmeiras)
—	DF	UKR	Serhiy Voronin
—	MF	BRA	Araujo (on loan to (Slovakia) Lokomotíva Košice)
—	MF	BRA	Augusto
—	MF	UKR	Maksym Kalenchuk (to (Ukraine) FC Rukh Vynnyky)
—	MF	UKR	Rostyslav Voloshynovych (to (Ukraine) Volyn Lutsk)
—	MF	UKR	Vadym Yanchak (to (Slovakia) Lokomotíva Košice)
—	MF	UKR	Artur Zapadnya (to (Ukraine) Volyn Lutsk)
—	FW	UKR	Serhiy Petrov (to (Ukraine) Rukh Vynnyky)
—	FW	BRA	Julio Cesar Moreira Ribeiro

=== Mariupol ===
In:

No.	Pos.	Nation	Player
—	FW	UKR	Danylo Sikan (on loan from (Ukraine) Shakhtar Donetsk)

Out:

No.	Pos.	Nation	Player
—	DF	UKR	Maksym Bilyi (to (Ukraine) Zorya Luhansk)
—	DF	UKR	Vladyslav Savin (on loan to (Ukraine) Avanhard Kramatorsk)
—	DF	UKR	Ivan Semenykhyn
—	MF	UKR	Artur Avahimyan (to (Ukraine) Arsenal Kyiv)
—	MF	UKR	Ihor Bykovskyi
—	MF	UKR	Kyrylo Matveyev (to (Germany) NTSV Strand 08)

=== Oleksandriya ===
In:

No.	Pos.	Nation	Player
—	DF	UKR	Oleh Sokolov (from (Ukraine) Chornomorets Odesa)
—	MF	UKR	Denys Dedechko (from (Russia) SKA-Khabarovsk)
—	MF	UKR	Valeriy Luchkevych (on loan from (Belgium) Standard Liège)
—	FW	UKR	Vladyslav Kulach (on loan from (Ukraine) Shakhtar Donetsk)

Out:

No.	Pos.	Nation	Player
—	DF	UKR	Valeriy Bondarenko (to (Ukraine) Shakhtar Donetsk)
—	MF	UKR	Vadym Vitenchuk (to (Ukraine) MFC Mykolaiv)

=== Olimpik Donetsk ===
In:

No.	Pos.	Nation	Player
—	GK	KOS	Betim Halimi (from (Estonia) Narva Trans)
—	DF	NGR	Darlington Igwekali (from (Turkey) Alanyaspor)
—	DF	UKR	Yehor Klymenchuk (free agent)
—	DF	UKR	Artem Kozlov (loan return from (Ukraine) PFC Sumy)
—	MF	UKR	Stanislav Sharay (loan return from (Ukraine) PFC Sumy)
—	MF	UKR	Vladyslav Sharay (loan return from (Ukraine) PFC Sumy)
—	MF	UKR	Rinar Valeyev (from (Georgia (country)) Shevardeni-1906 Tbilisi)
—	MF	UKR	Roman Vantukh (on loan from (Ukraine) Dynamo Kyiv)
—	FW	SEN	Matar Dieye (from (Italy) Este)

Out:

No.	Pos.	Nation	Player
—		UKR	Ruslan Rotan (to Ukraine under-21)
—	GK	UKR	Bohdan Bezkrovnyi
—	DF	UKR	Artem Kozlov (disqualified)
—	DF	UKR	Anton Kravchenko (to (Hungary) Kisvárda)
—	DF	UKR	Serhiy Melinyshyn
—	DF	UKR	Dmytro Nyemchaninov (loan return to (Russia) Krylia Sovetov Samara)
—	DF	UKR	Yevhen Zubeyko (to (Georgia (country)) Dinamo Batumi)
—	DF	UKR	Vladyslav Sharay (disqualified)
—	MF	UKR	Yevhen Troyanovskyi (to (Ukraine) Avanhard Kramatorsk)
—	MF	UKR	Serhiy Vakulenko (loan return to (Ukraine) Shakhtar Donetsk)
—	FW	UKR	Dmytro Bilonoh (loan return to (Ukraine) Zirka Kropyvnytskyi)
—	FW	UKR	Anton Shynder

=== Shakhtar Donetsk ===
In:

No.	Pos.	Nation	Player
—	GK	UKR	Mykyta Shevchenko (loan return from (Ukraine) Karpaty Lviv)
—	DF	UKR	Valeriy Bondarenko (from (Ukraine) FC Oleksandriya)
—	DF	UKR	Ihor Duts (loan return from (Ukraine) Rukh Vynnyky)
—	DF	UKR	Dmytro Shevchenko (loan return from (Ukraine) Rukh Vynnyky)
—	DF	UKR	Serhiy Vakulenko (loan return from (Ukraine) Olimpik Donetsk)
—	MF	BRA	Marcos Antônio (from (Portugal) Estoril)
—	MF	UKR	Serhiy Hryn (loan return from (Ukraine) Arsenal Kyiv)
—	MF	ISR	Manor Solomon (from (Israel) Maccabi Petah Tikva)
—	MF	BRA	Tetê (from (Brazil) Grêmio)
—	FW	UKR	Pylyp Budkivskyi (loan return from (France) Sochaux)
—	FW	UKR	Vladyslav Kulach (loan return from (Ukraine) Vorskla Poltava)
—	FW	UKR	Danylo Sikan (from (Ukraine) Karpaty Lviv)

Out:

No.	Pos.	Nation	Player
—	GK	UKR	Mykyta Shevchenko (to (Ukraine) Zorya Luhansk)
—	DF	UKR	Oleh Danchenko (on loan to (Russia) Yenisey Krasnoyarsk)
—	DF	UKR	Ihor Duts (to (Ukraine) Rukh Vynnyky)
—	DF	UKR	Yaroslav Rakitskiy (to (Russia) Zenit Saint Petersburg)
—	DF	UKR	Serhiy Vakulenko (on loan to (Ukraine) Arsenal Kyiv)
—	MF	UKR	Serhiy Hryn (to (Denmark) Vejle Boldklub)
—	MF	UKR	Mykhailo Mudryk (on loan to (Ukraine) Arsenal Kyiv)
—	MF	UKR	Vyacheslav Tankovskyi ((on loan?) to (Ukraine) Arsenal Kyiv)
—	FW	UKR	Pylyp Budkivskyi (to (Ukraine) Zorya Luhansk)
—	FW	UKR	Artem Dudik (on loan to (Belarus) FC Slutsk)
—	FW	UKR	Vladyslav Kulach (on loan to (Ukraine) FC Oleksandriya)
—	FW	UKR	Danylo Sikan (on loan to (Ukraine) FC Mariupol)

=== Vorskla Poltava ===
In:

No.	Pos.	Nation	Player
—	MF	SRB	Todor Petrović (from (Serbia) Voždovac)
—	MF	BIH	Edin Šehić (from (Croatia) Hajduk Split)

Out:

No.	Pos.	Nation	Player
—	DF	UKR	Myroslav Mazur (on loan to (Moldova) Sfântul Gheorghe Suruceni)
—	MF	ARM	Gegham Kadymyan (to (Ukraine) Arsenal Kyiv)
—	FW	UKR	Vladyslav Kulach (loan return to (Ukraine) Shakhtar Donetsk)
—	FW	UKR	Mykhaylo Serhiychuk (to (Ukraine) Desna Chernihiv)
—	FW	UKR	Volodymyr Odaryuk (on loan to (Ukraine) Hirnyk-Sport Horishni Plavni)

=== Zorya Luhansk ===
In:

No.	Pos.	Nation	Player
—		UKR	Serhiy Popov (from Ukraine under-19)
—	GK	UKR	Mykyta Shevchenko (from (Ukraine) Shakhtar Donetsk)
—	DF	UKR	Maksym Bilyi (from (Ukraine) FC Mariupol)
—	MF	UKR	Ihor Chaykovskyi (from (Russia) Anzhi Makhachkala)
—	MF	JPN	Itsuki Urata (from (Japan) Giravanz Kitakyushu)
—	MF	BRA	Mateus Norton (from (Brazil) Fluminense)
—	FW	UKR	Pylyp Budkivskyi (from (Ukraine) Shakhtar Donetsk)
—	FW	SRB	Nemanja Ivanović (from (Serbia) Sinđelić Beograd)

Out:

No.	Pos.	Nation	Player
—		UKR	Ihor Kasianenko
—	DF	UKR	Vasyl Pryima (to (Belarus) Shakhtyor Soligorsk)
—	DF	UKR	Oleksandr Svatok (to (Croatia) Hajduk Split)
—	MF	SRB	Anđelo Kačavenda (to (Ukraine) Tavriya Simferopol)
—	MF	UKR	Ihor Kharatin (to (Hungary) Ferencváros)
—	FW	BRA	Rafael Ratão (on loan to (Slovakia) Slovan Bratislava)

== Ukrainian First League ==
=== Ahrobiznes Volochysk ===
In:

No.	Pos.	Nation	Player
—	GK	UKR	Yevhen Panchenko (from (Ukraine) Cherkashchyna-Akademiya Bilozirya)
—	DF	UKR	Nazariy Shevchenko (from (Ukraine) Metalist 1925 Kharkiv)
—	MF	UKR	Yevhen Chepurnenko (from (Belarus) Dnepr Mogilev)
—	MF	UKR	Oleh Nychyporenko (from (Ukraine) FC Fortuna Anrushivka)
—	FW	UKR	Pavlo Fedosov (from (Ukraine) Nyva Vinnytsia)
—	DF	UKR	Oleksandr Aksyonov (from (Ukraine) FC Hirnyk-Sport Horishni Plavni)

Out:

No.	Pos.	Nation	Player
—	GK	UKR	Serhiy Chyzh
—	DF	UKR	Serhiy Atlasyuk (retired)
—	DF	UKR	Andriy Dubchak
—	DF	UKR	Vladyslav Poltoratskyi
—	DF	UKR	Serhiy Shum
—	MF	UKR	Serhiy Shevchuk (to (Ukraine) SC Chaika Petropavlivska Borshchahivka)
—	MF	UKR	Oleksandr Tsybulnyk (to (Ukraine) Cherkashchyna-Akademiya Bilozirya)
—	MF	UKR	Yevhen Zarichnyuk (to (Ukraine) MFC Mykolaiv)

=== Avanhard Kramatorsk ===
In:

No.	Pos.	Nation	Player
—	FW	UKR	Oleksandr Ivashchenko (retired becoming assistant coach at club)
—	DF	UKR	Vladyslav Savin (on loan from (Ukraine) Mariupol U-21)
—	DF	UKR	Dmytro Ulyanov (from (Georgia (country)) FC Samtredia)
—	DF	UKR	Vitaliy Yermakov (on loan from (Ukraine) Desna Chernihiv)
—	MF	UKR	Yaroslav Kinash (from (Ukraine) FC Volyn Lutsk)
—	FW	UKR	Bohdan Kushnarenko (from (Ukraine) Stal U-21 Kamianske)
—	MF	UKR	Mykyta Shevtsov (from (Ukraine) FC Kobra Ostroh)
—	MF	UKR	Oleh Yakovets (from (Ukraine) Arsenal–Kyiv U-19)
—	FW	UKR	Oleksiy Schebetun (from (Ukraine) Metalurh Zaporizhya)
—	DF	UKR	Yevhen Lytvyn (from (Ukraine) Vorskla Poltava)
—	MF	UKR	Yevhen Troyanovskyi (from (Ukraine) Olimpik Donetsk)
—	MF	UKR	Dmytro Kopytov (from (Ukraine) Dynamo Kyiv)
—	FW	UKR	Artem Khotsyanovskyi (from (Ukraine) Dynamo Kyiv)
—	GK	UKR	Mykyta Yakubenko (from (Ukraine) Avanhard U-19 Kramatorsk)
—	DF	UKR	Danylo Vladymyrov (from (Ukraine) Avanhard U-19 Kramatorsk)
—	MF	UKR	Ihor Bykovskyi (from (Ukraine) FC Mariupol)
—	MF	UKR	Roman Bobak (from (Germany) TSG Neustrelitz)

Out:

No.	Pos.	Nation	Player
—	GK	UKR	Mykyta Savchenko (to (Armenia) Lokomotiv Yerevan)
—	DF	UKR	Vadym Schastlyvtsev (disqualified)
—	DF	UKR	Dmytro Zaderetskyi (to (Ukraine) Kremin Kremenchuk)
—	MF	UKR	Dmytro Hrankin (to (Ukraine) FC Metalist 1925 Kharkiv)
—	FW	UKR	Viktor Khomchenko (to (Ukraine) FC Hirnyk-Sport Horishni Plavni)
—	MF	UKR	Oleksandr Luchyk (to free agent)
—	FW	UKR	Oleh Barannik (to free agent)
—	FW	UKR	Oleksandr Ivashchenko (retired)
—	FW	UKR	Mykhaylo Udod (to free agent)

=== Balkany Zorya ===
In:

No.	Pos.	Nation	Player
—	FW	UKR	Alisher Yakubov (from (Ukraine) Podillya Khmelnytskyi)

Out:

No.	Pos.	Nation	Player
—	DF	UKR	Dmytro Parkhomenko
—	FW	UKR	Vladyslav Kabanyuk (to free agent)

=== Dnipro-1 ===
In:

No.	Pos.	Nation	Player
—	DF	UKR	Zurab Ochigava (on loan from (Ukraine) Dynamo Kyiv)
—	MF	UKR	Yuriy Romanyuk (from (Ukraine) Chornomorets Odesa)
—	MF	UKR	Orest Kuzyk (on loan from (Greece) Giannina)
—	MF	UKR	Oleksandr Byelyayev (loan return from (Ukraine) Zirka Kropyvnytskyi)
—	DF	UKR	Oleksandr Safronov (loan return from (Ukraine) Zirka Kropyvnytskyi)
—	MF	UKR	Kamil Khuchbarov (loan return from (Ukraine) Inhulets Petrove)
—	MF	UKR	Yaroslav Homenko (loan return from (Ukraine) Inhulets Petrove)
—	FW	UKR	Vadym Yavorskyi (from (Ukraine) PFC Sumy)
—	MF	UKR	Arsen Batahov (from (Ukraine) FC Dnipro)
—	FW	UKR	Valentyn Rubchynskyi (from (Ukraine) FC Dnipro)

Out:

No.	Pos.	Nation	Player
—	MF	UKR	Dmytro Bashlay (to (Ukraine) FC Arsenal Kyiv)
—	MF	UKR	Yaroslav Homenko (to (Ukraine) FC Hirnyk Kryvyi Rih)
—	MF	UKR	Artem Schedryi (to (Ukraine) FC Inhulets Petrove)
—	FW	UKR	Denys Voitsekhovskyi (to (Ukraine) MFC Mykolaiv)
—	DF	UKR	Maksym Bilyk (to (Ukraine) MFC Mykolaiv)
—	DF	UKR	Oleksandr Mihunov (to (Ukraine) Kolos Kovalivka)
—	MF	UKR	Redvan Memeshev (to (Belarus) Slavia Mozyr)

=== Hirnyk-Sport Horishni Plavni ===
In:

No.	Pos.	Nation	Player
—		UKR	Volodymyr Mazyar (from (Kazakhstan) FC Akzhayik)
—	GK	UKR	Roman Chopko (from (Ukraine) FC Nyva Terebovlya)
—	DF	UKR	Oleksiy Pinchuk (from (Ukraine) FC Metalurh Zaporizhia)
—	DF	UKR	Volodymyr Shopin (from (Ukraine) SC Tavriya Simferopol)
—	DF	UKR	Dmytro Zozulya (from (Ukraine) Arsenal Kyiv)
—	DF	UKR	Rostyslav Dychko (from (Ukraine) Druzhba Ocheretovate)
—	MF	UKR	Anton Kotlyar (from (Ukraine) NK Veres Rivne)
—	MF	UKR	Viktor Lykhovydko (from (Ukraine) PFC Sumy)
—	MF	UKR	Roman Myronenko (from (Georgia (country)) FC Merani Martvili)
—	MF	UKR	Serhiy Zuyevych (from (Ukraine) Kolos Kovalivka)
—	FW	UKR	Volodymyr Odaryuk (on loan from (Ukraine) Vorskla Poltava)

Out:

No.	Pos.	Nation	Player
—		UKR	Serhiy Puchkov
—	GK	UKR	Oleksiy Bashtanenko
—	DF	UKR	Oleksandr Aksyonov (to (Ukraine) FC Ahrobiznes Volochysk)
—	DF	UKR	Mykyta Khodakovskyi (to free agent)
—	DF	UKR	Roman Kunyev
—	DF	UKR	Dmytro Sydorenko (to (Ukraine) Metalist 1925 Kharkiv)
—	DF	UKR	Vladyslav Zhenylenko (to (Ukraine) FC Kremin Kremenchuk)
—	MF	UKR	Bohdan Borovskyi
—	MF	UKR	Oleksandr Maksymenko (to (Ukraine) SC Tavriya Simferopol)
—	MF	UKR	Andriy Skarlosh
—	MF	UKR	Andriy Vlasyuk (to (Ukraine) FC Polissya Zhytomyr (2016))
—	MF	UKR	Yaroslav Yampol (to (Ukraine) Metalist 1925 Kharkiv)
—	MF	UKR	Andriy Yefremov (to (Ukraine) Chaika Petropavlivska Borshchahivka)
—	FW	UKR	Andriy Fayuk (to (Ukraine) Metalist 1925 Kharkiv)
—	FW	UKR	Andriy Shevchuk

=== Inhulets Petrove ===
In:

No.	Pos.	Nation	Player
—	GK	UKR	Roman Herych (from (Ukraine) FC Kalush)
—	DF	UKR	Bohdan Mytsyk (from (Lithuania) Atlantas Klaipėda)
—	DF	UKR	Mykhaylo Pysko (from (Ukraine) Rukh Vynnyky)
—	MF	UKR	Illya Kovalenko (from (Ukraine) Desna Chernihiv)
—	MF	UKR	Artem Schedryi (from (Ukraine) SC Dnipro-1)
—	FW	UKR	Dmytro Sula (from (Ukraine) FC Metalist 1925 Kharkiv)

Out:

No.	Pos.	Nation	Player
—	GK	UKR	Hennadiy Hanyev (to (Bulgaria) FC Vereya)
—	DF	UKR	Ihor Kotsyumaka (to (Ukraine) Hirnyk Kryvyi Rih)
—	MF	UKR	Roman Honcharenko (to (Ukraine) Polissya Zhytomyr)
—	MF	UKR	Artem Kozlov (on loan to (Ukraine) Kremin Kremenchuk)
—	DF	UKR	Artur Novotryasov (to (Autonomous Republic of Crimea) FC Krymteplytsia Molodizhne)
—	MF	UKR	Yaroslav Homenko (from loan to (Ukraine) SC Dnipro-1)
—	MF	UKR	Kamil Khuchbarov (from loan to (Ukraine) SC Dnipro-1)
—	MF	GEO	Giorgi Kobuladze
—	MF	UKR	Illya Kovalenko (loan return to (Ukraine) Desna Chernihiv)

=== Kolos Kovalivka ===
In:

No.	Pos.	Nation	Player
—	GK	UKR	Andriy Kuvshynkin (from (Ukraine) Kolos U-17 Kovalivka)
—	DF	UKR	Oleksandr Mihunov (from (Ukraine) SC Dnipro-1)
—	DF	UKR	Nazariy Shevchenko (loan return from (Ukraine) Metalist 1925 Kharkiv)
—	MF	UKR	Maksym Banasevych (on loan from (Ukraine) FC Desna Chernihiv)

Out:

No.	Pos.	Nation	Player
—	GK	UKR	Vasyl Lytvynenko (to (Ukraine) FC Obolon-Brovar Kyiv)
—	DF	UKR	Danylo Shevchenko (to (Ukraine) FC Ahrobiznes Volochysk)
—	MF	UKR	Serhiy Zuyevych (to (Ukraine) Hirnyk-Sport Horishni Plavni)
—	MF	UKR	Ruslan Kisil
—	MF	UKR	Vasyl Koropetsky (to free agent)
—	FW	UKR	Yuriy Solomka (to (Ukraine) Polissya Zhytomyr)

=== Metalist 1925 Kharkiv ===
In:

No.	Pos.	Nation	Player
—	DF	UKR	Vladyslav Kravchenko (from (Ukraine) FC Volyn Lutsk)
—	MF	BRA	Fabinho (free agent)
—	MF	UKR	Andriy Fayuk (from (Ukraine) FC Hirnyk-Sport Horishni Plavni)
—	MF	UKR	Yaroslav Yampol (from (Ukraine) FC Hirnyk-Sport Horishni Plavni)
—	MF	UKR	Dmytro Sydorenko (from (Ukraine) FC Hirnyk-Sport Horishni Plavni)
—	MF	UKR	Dmytro Hrankin (from (Ukraine) FC Avanhard Kramatorsk)
—	MF	UKR	Kyrylo Yermoshenko (from (Ukraine) FC Metalist-Junior Kharkiv)
—	MF	GEO	Luka Koberidze (from (Ukraine) Desna Chernihiv)
—	MF	UKR	Ihor Koshman (from (Georgia (country)) FC Samtredia)

Out:

No.	Pos.	Nation	Player
—	GK	UKR	Vladyslav Fedak (to (Ukraine) Veres Rivne)
—	DF	UKR	Nazariy Shevchenko (loan return to (Ukraine) Kolos Kovalivka)
—	DF	UKR	Vladyslav Yemelyanov (on loan to (Ukraine) Polissya Zhytomyr)
—	FW	UKR	Dmytro Sula (to (Ukraine) FC Inhulets Petrove)
—	DF	UKR	Dmytro Prykhna (to (Ukraine) Veres Rivne)
—	DF	UKR	Dmytro Klimakov (to free agent)
—	MF	UKR	Mykhailo Mazun (to free agent)
—	MF	UKR	Yevhen Terzi (to (Ukraine) MFC Metalurh Zaporizhia)

=== Mykolaiv ===
In:

No.	Pos.	Nation	Player
—		UKR	Serhiy Shyshchenko (from (Ukraine) Shakhtar U-19 Donetsk)
—		UKR	Mykola Hybalyuk (from (Ukraine) FC Sevlyush)
—		UKR	Roman Chumak (from (Ukraine) MFC Mykolaiv)
—	DF	UKR	Oleksandr Kvachov (from (Ukraine) PFC Sumy)
—	GK	UKR	Amir Ahalarov (from (Ukraine) Enerhiya Nova Kakhovka)
—	DF	UKR	Maksym Bilyk (from (Ukraine) SC Dnipro-1)
—	MF	UKR	Bohdan Kuksenko (from (Ukraine) Tavriya Simferopol)
—	MF	UKR	Vadym Vitenchuk (from (Ukraine) FC Oleksandriya)
—	MF	UKR	Yevhen Zarichnyuk (from (Ukraine) Ahrobiznes Volochysk)
—	FW	UKR	Vladyslav Voytsekhovskyi (from (Ukraine) SC Dnipro-1)

Out:

No.	Pos.	Nation	Player
—		UKR	Ruslan Zabranskyi
—	GK	UKR	Yehor Popovych (to (Ukraine) FC Kalush)
—	DF	UKR	Stanislav Chuchman (to (Ukraine) NK Veres Rivne)
—	DF	UKR	Oleh Dmytrenko (to (Ukraine) FC Mynai)
—	DF	UKR	Andriy Hurskyi (to (Ukraine) NK Veres Rivne)
—	MF	UKR	Ivan Antonyuk (to (Ukraine) FC Kalush)
—	MF	UKR	Tymofiy Bryzhchuk (to (Ukraine) FC Nyva Vinnytsia)
—	MF	UKR	Vitaliy Ryabushko (to (Ukraine) FC Olimpiya Savyntsi)
—	MF	UKR	Mykyta Sharabura (to (Ukraine) Tavriya Simferopol)
—	MF	UKR	Vladyslav Avramenko (to free agent)
—	FW	UKR	Vadym Petrov (to (Ukraine) Metalurh Zaporizhya)

=== Obolon-Brovar Kyiv ===
In:

No.	Pos.	Nation	Player
—	GK	UKR	Vasyl Lytvynenko (from (Ukraine) FC Kolos Kovalivka)
—	DF	UKR	Maksym Potopalskyi (from (Ukraine) Obolon-Brovar U-19 Kyiv)
—	MF	UKR	Ivan Chystyak (from (Ukraine) Obolon-Brovar U-19 Kyiv)
—	FW	UKR	Anton Rafalskyi (from (Ukraine) Obolon-Brovar U-19 Kyiv)

Out:

No.	Pos.	Nation	Player

=== Prykarpattia Ivano-Frankivsk ===
In:

No.	Pos.	Nation	Player
—	GK	UKR	Vasyl Stefyuk (from (Ukraine) FC Kalush)
—	MF	UKR	Roman Kuzmin (from (Germany) Bad Westernkotten Erwitte)
—	DF	UKR	Valeriy Hrabets (from (Ukraine) Enerhiya Nova Kakhovka)

Out:

No.	Pos.	Nation	Player
—	DF	UKR	Andriy Hromolyak (to (Ukraine) FC Karpaty Kolomyia)
—	DF	UKR	Roman Proshak (to (Ukraine) FC Bukovyna Chernivtsi)
—	MF	UKR	Artur Komar (to (Ukraine) FC Kalush)
—	FW	UKR	Andriy Slobodyan (to free agent)

=== Rukh Vynnyky ===
In:

No.	Pos.	Nation	Player
—		BLR	Leonid Kuchuk (to (Russia) FC Rostov)
—	GK	UKR	Roman Mysak (from (Denmark) AGF Aarhus)
—	DF	UKR	Ihor Duts (from (Ukraine) Shakhtar Donetsk)
—	DF	UKR	Mykyta Khodorchenko (from (Ukraine) Zirka Kropyvnytskyi)
—	DF	BRA	Leandro da Silva (from (Lithuania) Atlantas Klaipėda)
—	DF	UKR	Ruslan Marushka (from (Lithuania) Atlantas Klaipėda)
—	DF	BRA	Sidnney (from (Brazil) Esporte Clube Bahia)
—	MF	UKR	Bohdan Boychuk (from (Moldova) Dinamo-Auto Tiraspol)
—	MF	BRA	Gabriel (from (Brazil) Volta Redonda Futebol Clube)
—	MF	UKR	Maksym Kalenchuk (from (Ukraine) FC Lviv)
—	MF	UKR	Danylo Kondrakov (from (Ukraine) Zirka Kropyvnytskyi)
—	MF	UKR	Yuriy Klymchuk (from (Ukraine) FC Stal Kamianske)
—	MF	UKR	Nazar Verbnyi (on loan from (Ukraine) Karpaty Lviv)
—	FW	UKR	Serhiy Petrov (from (Ukraine) FC Lviv)

Out:

No.	Pos.	Nation	Player
—		UKR	Yuriy Virt
—	GK	UKR	Oleksandr Dyachenko (retired)
—	DF	UKR	Ihor Duts (loan return to (Ukraine) Shakhtar Donetsk)
—	DF	UKR	Mykhaylo Pysko (to (Ukraine) Inhulets Petrove)
—	DF	UKR	Dmytro Shevchenko (loan return to (Ukraine) Shakhtar Donetsk)
—	MF	UKR	Andriy Busko (loan return to (Ukraine) Karpaty Lviv)
—	MF	UKR	Mykhaylo Kozak (to (Ukraine) FC Desna Chernihiv)
—	MF	UKR	Volodymyr Makar (retired)
—	FW	UKR	Andriy Remenyuk (loan return to (Ukraine) Karpaty Lviv)
—	FW	UKR	Volodymyr Voytovych (loan return to (Ukraine) Karpaty Lviv)
—	FW	UKR	Oleksandr Batalskyi (to (Georgia (country)) Shevardeni-1906 Tbilisi)
—	FW	UKR	Artur Zahorulko
—	FW	UKR	Denys Arendaruk (to (Ukraine) Metalurh Zaporizhia (on loan from Shakhtar Donetsk))

=== Sumy ===
In:

No.	Pos.	Nation	Player
—		UKR	Serhiy Vashchenko (from (Ukraine) FC Kobra Kharkiv)
—		UKR	Oleksandr Oliynyk (from (Ukraine) FC Kobra Kharkiv)
—		UKR	Ivan Vashchenko (from (Ukraine) Football Academy Kobra)
—		UKR	Mykyta Domashenko (from (Ukraine) Football Academy Kobra)
—		UKR	Oleksandr Kolokol (from (Ukraine) Football Academy Kobra)
—		UKR	Bohdan Malyshev (from (Ukraine) Football Academy Kobra)
—		UKR	Viniamin Muzychuk (from (Ukraine) Football Academy Kobra)
—		UKR	Farid Nazipov (from (Ukraine) Football Academy Kobra)
—		UKR	Yehor Svistyula (from (Ukraine) Football Academy Kobra)
—		UKR	Vladyslav Shynkarov (from (Ukraine) Football Academy Kobra)
—		UKR	Mykhailo Matvienko (from (Ukraine) Football Academy Kobra)
—		UKR	Danylo Yermolayev (from (Ukraine) Football Academy Kobra)
—	FW	UKR	Vyacheslav Panfilov (from (Ukraine) SC Chaika Petropavlivska Borshchahivka)
—	FW	UKR	Oleksandr Yatsyuchenko (from (Ukraine) SC Chaika Petropavlivska Borshchahivka)
—		UKR	Ivan Tkachuk (from (Ukraine) Temp Vinnytsia jr)
—		FRA	Sofiene Draa
—	FW	UKR	Artem Hrechykhin (from (Ukraine) FC Pervomaiskyi)
—	MF	UKR	Vitaliy Shmorhun (from (Ukraine) FC Khmelnytskyi)
—	MF	UKR	Denys Kozlov (from (Ukraine) FC Kalush)
—	DF	UKR	Oleksiy Bozhyi (from (Ukraine) Metalurh Zaporizhia)
—	MF	UKR	Nazar Kurus (from (Ukraine) Metalurh Zaporizhia)
—	GK	UKR	Bohdan Druz (from (Ukraine) FC Lviv)

Out:

No.	Pos.	Nation	Player
—		UKR	Serhiy Zolotnytskyi
—	DF	UKR	Serhiy Zahynaylov (to (Kazakhstan) Atyrau)
—	DF	UKR	Oleksandr Kvachov (to (Ukraine) MFC Mykolaiv)
—	DF	UKR	Artem Kozlov (disqualified)
—	MF	GEO	Luka Nadiradze (disqualified)
—	DF	GEO	Davit Kokhia (to (Georgia (country)) Shevardeni-1906 Tbilisi)
—	MF	UKR	Vadym Bovtruk (to (Ukraine) NK Veres Rivne)
—	MF	UKR	Viktor Lykhovydko (to (Ukraine) FC Hirnyk-Sport Horishni Plavni)
—	MF	UKR	Oleksandr Medved (to (Ukraine) FC Cherkashchyna-Akademiya Biloziria)
—	FW	UKR	Rostyslav Taranukha (to (Ukraine) FC Polissya Zhytomyr (2016))
—	FW	UKR	Vadym Yavorskyi (to (Ukraine) SC Dnipro-1)
—	GK	UKR	Andriy Bubentsov (to (Ukraine) FC VPK-Ahro Shevchenkivka)
—	GK	UKR	Artem Shtanko (to free agent)
—	DF	UKR	Serhiy Harashchenkov (disqualified)
—	MF	UKR	Oleksandr Vasylchenko (to free agent)
—	MF	UKR	Mykola Vechurko (to (Ukraine) SC Chaika Petropavlivska Borshchahivka)
—	MF	UKR	Yaroslav Kirienko (to free agent)
—	MF	UKR	Yehor Luhovyi (to free agent)
—	MF	UKR	Anton Savin (to (Ukraine) Polissya Zhytomyr)
—	MF	UKR	Vladyslav Sharay (loan return to (Ukraine) Olimpik Donetsk)
—	MF	UKR	Stanislav Sharay (loan return to (Ukraine) Olimpik Donetsk)
—	FW	UKR	Petro Pereverza (to free agent)
—	FW	UKR	Ilya Perepelytsya (to (Ukraine) Chaika Petropavlivska Borshchahivka)

=== Volyn Lutsk ===
In:

No.	Pos.	Nation	Player
—	DF	UKR	Oleksandr Matkobozhyk (from (Ukraine) Zirka Kropyvnytskyi)
—	DF	UKR	Anatoliy Ulyanov (from (Ukraine) FC Kalush)
—	MF	UKR	Artur Zapadnya (from (Ukraine) FC Lviv)
—	MF	UKR	Rostyslav Voloshynovych (from (Ukraine) FC Lviv)

Out:

No.	Pos.	Nation	Player
—	DF	UKR	Vladyslav Kravchenko (to (Ukraine) Metalist 1925 Kharkiv)
—	DF	UKR	Rudolf Sukhomlynov (to (Ukraine) Polissya Zhytomyr)
—	DF	UKR	Nazar Stasyshyn (loan return to (Ukraine) Karpaty Lviv)
—	MF	BRA	Bruninho
—	MF	UKR	Volodymyr Korobka
—	MF	UKR	Oleh Marchuk
—	MF	UKR	Andriy Yakovlyev (to (Armenia) FC Ararat Yerevan)

=== Zirka Kropyvnytskyi ===
In:

No.	Pos.	Nation	Player
—	FW	UKR	Yevhen Katelin (from (Ukraine) FC Metalurh Zaporizhia)

Out:

No.	Pos.	Nation	Player
—	DF	UKR	Oleksandr Duhiyenko (to (Ukraine) Nyva Vinnytsia)
—	DF	UKR	Oleksandr Safronov (loan return to (Ukraine) SC Dnipro-1)
—	MF	UKR	Oleksandr Belyayev (loan return to (Ukraine) SC Dnipro-1)
—	MF	UKR	Nazar Vyzdryk (to (Ukraine) Nyva Vinnytsia)
—	MF	UKR	Dmytro Bilonoh (to (Belarus) Dinamo Minsk)
—	DF	UKR	Dmytro Fateev (to (Ukraine) FC Lviv)
—	MF	UKR	Dmytro Khorolskyi (to (Ukraine) FC Kalush)
—	MF	UKR	Yaroslav Poplavka (to (Ukraine) FC Oleksandriya)
—	MF	UKR	Roman Lyopka (to (Ukraine) FC Avanhard Kramatorsk)
—	MF	UKR	Maksym Averyanov (to (Ukraine) FC Kremin Kremenchuk)
—	FW	UKR	Artem Syomka (to (Ukraine) FC Hirnyk Kryvyi Rih)
—	MF	UKR	Danylo Falkovskyi (to (Ukraine) MFC Mykolaiv-2)
—	MF	UKR	Danylo Kondrakov (to (Ukraine) Rukh Vynnyky)
—	MF	UKR	Andriy Savitskiy (to (Ukraine) FC Oleksandriya)
—	FW	UKR	Stanislav Pysarev (to (Ukraine) FC Oleksandriya)
