= 2018–19 FC Karpaty Lviv season =

Karpaty Lviv
2018–19 season
- President: Petro Dyminsky
- Manager: Oleh Boychyshyn (until 16 August 2018); José Morais (since 16 August 2018 until 28 November 2018); Fabri (since 13 January 2019 until 27 May 2019)
- Stadium: Ukraina Stadium, Lviv
- Premier League: 10th
- Ukrainian Cup: Quarter-finals
- Top goalscorer: League: Maryan Shved (14); All: Maryan Shved (15)
- Highest home attendance: 12,252 vs FC Lviv; 3 March 2019
- Lowest home attendance: 777 vs Desna; 18 May 2019
Home colours	Away colours	Third colours

The 2018–19 season was 26th season in the top Ukrainian football league for FC Karpaty Lviv. Karpaty competed in Premier League, Ukrainian Cup.

== Players ==
=== Squad information ===
As of 8 June 2019

Squad no.	Name	Nationality	Position	Date of birth (age)
Goalkeepers
1	Maksym Kuchynskyi	(Ukraine)	GK	28 June 1988 (aged 30)
71	Herman Penkov	(Ukraine)	GK	26 May 1994 (aged 25)
Defenders
4	Nika Sandokhadze	(Georgia (country))	DF	20 February 1994 (aged 25)
5	Andriy Nesterov	(Ukraine)	DF	2 July 1990 (aged 28)
19	Papa Gueye	(Senegal)	DF	7 June 1984 (aged 35)
29	Martin Hongla (on loan from Granada B) ^{List B}	(Cameroon)	DF	16 March 1998 (aged 21)
44	Artem Fedetskyi (Captain)	(Ukraine)	DF	26 April 1985 (aged 34)
49	Roman Slyva ^{List B}	(Ukraine)	DF	23 September 2000 (aged 18)
50	Oleksiy Kovtun	(Ukraine)	DF	5 February 1995 (aged 24)
94	Denys Miroshnichenko	(Ukraine)	DF	11 October 1994 (aged 24)
99	Adi Mehremić	(Bosnia and Herzegovina)	DF	26 April 1992 (aged 27)
Midfielders
20	Francisco Di Franco	(Argentina)	MF	28 January 1995 (aged 24)
33	Serhiy Myakushko	(Ukraine)	MF	15 April 1993 (aged 26)
48	Dmytro Klyots	(Ukraine)	MF	15 April 1996 (aged 23)
68	Roman Tolochko ^{List B}	(Ukraine)	MF	25 October 1998 (aged 20)
74	Karim Yoda	(France) (Ivory Coast)	MF	25 October 1988 (aged 30)
Forwards
9	Oleksiy Hutsulyak ^{List B}	(Ukraine)	FW	25 December 1997 (aged 21)
10	Cristian Ponde	(Portugal)	FW	26 January 1995 (aged 24)
11	Kevin Méndez	(Uruguay)	FW	10 January 1996 (aged 23)
13	Yaroslav Deda ^{List B}	(Ukraine)	FW	28 May 1999 (aged 20)
17	Roman Debelko	(Ukraine)	FW	8 August 1993 (aged 25)
35	Maryan Shved (on loan from Celtic)	(Ukraine)	FW	16 July 1997 (aged 21)
77	William De Camargo (on loan from CD Leganés B) ^{List B}	(Brazil)	FW	27 February 1999 (aged 20)

== Transfers ==
=== In ===
Date	Pos.	Player	Age	Moving from	Type	Fee	Source
Summer
1 June 2018	FW	(Argentina) Francisco Di Franco	23	(Cyprus) Apollon Limassol	Transfer	Undisclosed	
27 June 2018	MF	(Colombia) Jorge Carrascal	20	(Spain) Sevilla Atlético	Transfer	€2 Million	
5 July 2018	DF	(Ukraine) Oleksiy Kovtun	23	(Belarus) FC Minsk	Transfer	Free	
6 July 2018	GK	(Ukraine) Herman Penkov	24	(Ukraine) Stal Kamianske	Transfer	Undisclosed	
17 July 2018	DF	(Ukraine) Oleh Boroday	25	(Ukraine) FC Poltava	Transfer	Free	
17 July 2018	DF	(Bosnia and Herzegovina) Adi Mehremić	26	(Bosnia and Herzegovina) Željezničar Sarajevo	Transfer	Free	
17 July 2018	FW	(Uruguay) Kevin Méndez	22	(Italy) Roma	Transfer	Undisclosed	
18 July 2018	GK	(Ukraine) Maksym Kuchynskyi	30	(Ukraine) FC Poltava	Transfer	Free	
6 September 2018	FW	(Portugal) Cristian Ponde	23	(Portugal) Sporting B	Transfer	Undisclosed	
31 October 2018	DF	(Senegal) Papa Gueye	34	Unattached	Transfer	Undisclosed	
30 August 2018	FW	(Brazil) William De Camargo	19	(Spain) Leganés B	Loan	Undisclosed	
3 September 2018	GK	(Ukraine) Mykyta Shevchenko	25	(Ukraine) Shakhtar Donetsk	Loan	Undisclosed	
31 May 2018	GK	(Ukraine) Oleh Mozil	22	(Ukraine) FC Lviv	Loan return		
31 May 2018	FW	(Uruguay) Sebastián Ribas	30	(Argentina) Patronato	Loan return		
7 August 2018	FW	(Ukraine) Viktor Khomchenko	23	(Ukraine) Rukh Vynnyky	Loan return		
Winter
14 February 2019	DF	(France) Karim Yoda	30	(Spain) Reus	Transfer	Free	
28 February 2019	FW	(Ukraine) Viktor Khomchenko	24	(Ukraine) Avanhard Kramatorsk	Transfer	Free	
1 March 2019	FW	(Ukraine) Yaroslav Deda	19	Unattached	Transfer	Free	
31 December 2018	DF	(Ukraine) Andriy Markovych	23	(Estonia) Nõmme Kalju	Loan return		
31 December 2018	DF	(Georgia (country)) Nika Sandokhadze	24	(Latvia) Rīgas Futbola Skola	Loan return		
31 December 2018	DF	(Ukraine) Nazar Stasyshyn	21	(Ukraine) Volyn Lutsk	Loan return		
31 December 2018	MF	(Ukraine) Andriy Busko	21	(Ukraine) Rukh Vynnyky	Loan return		
31 December 2018	MF	(Ukraine) Roman Debelko	25	(Estonia) Levadia Tallinn	Loan return		
31 December 2018	MF	(Ukraine) Yuriy Tkachuk	23	(Estonia) Levadia Tallinn	Loan return		
31 December 2018	FW	(Ukraine) Volodymyr Voytovych	20	(Ukraine) Rukh Vynnyky	Loan return		
31 December 2018	FW	(Ukraine) Andriy Remenyuk	19	(Ukraine) Rukh Vynnyky	Loan return		
28 January 2019	DF	(Cameroon) Martin Hongla	20	(Spain) Granada B	Loan		
31 January 2019	FW	(Ukraine) Maryan Shved	21	(Scotland) Celtic	Loan		

=== Out ===
Date	Pos.	Player	Age	Moving to	Type	Fee	Source
Summer
31 May 2018	GK	(Ukraine) Roman Mysak	26	(Ukraine) Olimpik Donetsk	Transfer	Free	
31 May 2018	DF	(Ukraine) Yuriy Zavinskyi	20	Unattached	Transfer	Free	
6 June 2018	FW	(Uruguay) Sebastián Ribas	30	(Argentina) Lanús	Transfer	€470,000	
17 June 2018	GK	(Ukraine) Oleksiy Shevchenko	26	(Ukraine) Shakhtar Donetsk	Transfer	Undisclosed	
12 July 2018	FW	(Ukraine) Taras Petskiv	19	(Ukraine) Veres Rivne	Transfer / Loan ?	Undisclosed	
16 July 2018	GK	(Ukraine) Oleh Mozil	22	(Ukraine) Polissya Zhytomyr	Transfer / Loan ?	Undisclosed	
19 July 2018	FW	(Ukraine) Dmytro Zayikyn	22	(Ukraine) Veres Rivne	Transfer / Loan ?	Undisclosed	
20 July 2018	MF	(Ukraine) Ambrosiy Chachua	24	(Kazakhstan) Akzhayik	Transfer	Free	
5 August 2018	FW	(Ukraine) Maksym Salamakha	22	(Ukraine) Veres Rivne	Transfer / Loan ?	Undisclosed	
29 August 2018	DF	(Ukraine) Nazar Vyzdryk	22	(Ukraine) Zirka Kropyvnytskyi	Transfer	Free	
31 August 2018	DF	(Ukraine) Ivan Lobay	22	(Ukraine) Rukh Vynnyky	Transfer	Undisclosed	
31 August 2018	MF	(Ukraine) Roman Lebed	21	Unattached	Transfer	Free	
31 August 2018	FW	(Ukraine) Viktor Khomchenko	23	(Ukraine) Avanhard Kramatorsk	Transfer	Undisclosed	
19 October 2018	FW	(Ukraine) Leonid Akulinin	25	(Ukraine) Arsenal Kyiv	Transfer	Free	
31 May 2018	MF	(Colombia) Jorge Carrascal	20	(Spain) Sevilla Atlético	Loan return		
31 May 2018	FW	(Argentina) Francisco Di Franco	23	(Cyprus) Apollon Limassol	Loan return		
29 July 2018	FW	(Colombia) Maurício Cortés	21	(Colombia) Independiente Medellín	Loan return		
21 June 2018	DF	(Ukraine) Nazar Stasyshyn	20	(Ukraine) Volyn Lutsk	Loan		
21 June 2018	FW	(Ukraine) Ihor Karpenko	21	(Ukraine) Volyn Lutsk	Loan		
17 July 2018	MF	(Ukraine) Andriy Busko	21	(Ukraine) Rukh Vynnyky	Loan		
23 July 2018	DF	(Georgia (country)) Nika Sandokhadze	24	(Latvia) Rīgas Futbola Skola	Loan		
29 August 2018	FW	(Ukraine) Volodymyr Voytovych	20	(Ukraine) Rukh Vynnyky	Loan		
31 August 2018	FW	(Ukraine) Andriy Remenyuk	19	(Ukraine) Rukh Vynnyky	Loan		
Winter
1 January 2019	DF	(Ukraine) Andriy Markovych	23	(Estonia) Nõmme Kalju	Transfer	Undisclosed	
1 January 2019	MF	(Ukraine) Yuriy Tkachuk	23	(Estonia) Levadia Tallinn	Transfer	Undisclosed	
2 January 2019	MF	(Argentina) Cristian Erbes	28	(Paraguay) Club Nacional	Transfer	Undisclosed	
21 January 2019	DF	(Ukraine) Orest Lebedenko	20	(Spain) Lugo	Transfer	€700,000	
21 January 2019	FW	(Ukraine) Danylo Sikan	17	(Ukraine) Shakhtar Donetsk	Transfer	$150,000	
26 January 2019	MF	(Ukraine) Oleh Holodyuk	31	(Hungary) Haladás	Transfer	Free	
31 January 2019	FW	(Ukraine) Maryan Shved	21	(Scotland) Celtic	Transfer	€2 Million	
15 February 2019	DF	(Ukraine) Oleh Boroday	25	(Poland) Górnik Łęczna	Transfer	Free	
22 February 2019	GK	(Ukraine) Roman Pidkivka	23	(Ukraine) Arsenal Kyiv	Transfer	Free	
3 May 2019	FW	(Colombia) Yhonatan Bedoya	22	Unattached	Transfer	Free	
6 May 2019	FW	(Ukraine) Viktor Khomchenko	24	Unattached	Transfer	Free	
10 May 2019	FW	(Bolivia) Rodrigo Vargas	24	Unattached	Transfer	Free	
3 September 2018	GK	(Ukraine) Mykyta Shevchenko	26	(Ukraine) Shakhtar Donetsk	Loan return		
31 December 2018	FW	(Argentina) Catriel Sánchez	20	(Argentina) Talleres de Córdoba	Loan return		
30 January 2019	MF	(Colombia) Jorge Carrascal	20	(Argentina) River Plate	Loan	€500,000	
9 March 2019	MF	(Ukraine) Nazar Verbnyi	21	(Ukraine) Rukh Vynnyky	Loan		

== Pre-season and friendlies ==
22 June 2018 Friendly	FC Halych	3 – 1	Karpaty Lviv	Halych
17:00 EEST (UTC+03:00)	Turchanskyi 6'; Lebedenko 74' (o.g.); Kushetskyi 87'	Report	Myakushko 55'	Stadium: Kolos Stadium; Referee: Taras Demyanchuk

24 June 2018 Friendly	Karpaty Lviv	2 – 0	Nyva Ternopil	Lviv
12:00 EEST (UTC+03:00)	Shved 44'; Voytovych 89'	Report		Stadium: Ukraina Stadium

1 July 2018 Friendly	Karpaty Lviv	1 – 1	Ahrobiznes Volochysk	Lviv
18:00 EEST (UTC+03:00)	Myakushko 48'	Report	Skakun 30'	Stadium: Ukraina Stadium

4 July 2018 Friendly	Karpaty Lviv	2 – 0	Prykarpattia Ivano-Frankivsk	Lviv
13:00 EEST (UTC+03:00)	Shved 42'; Sánchez 72'	Report		Stadium: Ukraina Stadium

8 July 2018 Friendly	Zagłębie Sosnowiec (Poland)	2 – 3	Karpaty Lviv	Sosnowiec, Poland
16:00 CEST (UTC+02:00)	Torunarigha 32'; Lewicki 68'	Report	Myakushko 15', 52'; Carrascal 84'	Stadium: Stadion Ludowy; Referee: Piotr Lasyk (Poland)

10 July 2018 Friendly	Viktoria Otrokovice (Czech Republic)	0 – 8	Karpaty Lviv	Poland
17:00 CEST (UTC+02:00)		Report	Chachua 16'; Vargas 29', 34', 41'; Sánchez 30', 54', 58'; Myakushko

12 July 2018 Friendly	GKS Tychy (Poland)	0 – 1	Karpaty Lviv	Wodzisław Śląski, Poland
10:30 CEST (UTC+02:00)		Report	Myakushko 45'	Stadium: Gosław Sports Center

9 September 2018 Friendly	Lechia Gdańsk (Poland)	0 – 1	Karpaty Lviv	Gdańsk, Poland
18:30 CEST (UTC+02:00)		Report	Ponde 23' (pen.)	Stadium: Stadion Energa Gdańsk; Attendance: 9,437; Referee: Dominik Sulikowski (Poland)

17 November 2018 Friendly	Karpaty Lviv	0 – 0	Rukh Vynnyky	Briukhovychi
11:00 EET (UTC+02:00)		Report		Stadium: NTB Karpaty

23 January 2019 Friendly	Septemvri Sofia (Bulgaria)	0 – 1	Karpaty Lviv	Turkey
16:00 EET (UTC+02:00)		Report	Ponde 73'

27 January 2019 Friendly	Ružomberok (Slovakia)	2 – 1	Karpaty Lviv	Turkey
16:30 EET (UTC+02:00)	Mustedanagić 49'; Brenkus 77'	Report	Di Franco

28 January 2019 Friendly	FC Taraz (Kazakhstan)	1 – 3	Karpaty Lviv	Turkey
16:30 EET (UTC+02:00)	Elivelto 45'	Report	Méndez; Myakushko; Debelko

30 January 2019 Friendly	Jagiellonia Białystok (Poland)	1 – 0	Karpaty Lviv	Belek, Turkey
15:00 EET (UTC+02:00)	Sandokhadze 4' (o.g.)	Report

2 February 2019 Friendly	Napredak Kruševac (Serbia)	0 – 1	Karpaty Lviv	Turkey
16:00 EET (UTC+02:00)		Report	Shved

10 February 2019 Friendly	Dinamo Minsk (Belarus)	1 – 2	Karpaty Lviv	Belek, Turkey
16:00 EET (UTC+02:00)	Zubovich 90+2' (pen.)	Report	Shved 16' (pen.); Debelko 47'

13 February 2019 Friendly	Torpedo Kutaisi (Georgia (country))	0 – 3	Karpaty Lviv	Turkey
17:00 EET (UTC+02:00)		Report	Shved; Ponde

16 February 2019 Friendly	Kairat Almaty (Kazakhstan)	1 – 1	Karpaty Lviv	Turkey
16:00 EET (UTC+02:00)	Eseola 51'	Report	Slyva 71'

19 February 2019 Friendly	Bytovia Bytów (Poland)	1 – 3	Karpaty Lviv	Belek, Turkey
16:00 EET (UTC+02:00)	Burkhardt 71' (pen.)	Report	Ponde 46'; Vargas 69'; Shved 90+1' (pen.)

24 March 2019 Friendly	Karpaty Lviv	4 – 1	Nyva Ternopil	Lviv
16:00 EET (UTC+02:00)	Yoda 13'; Vargas 31'; Hutsulyak 36'; Busko 45'	Report	Lytovchenko 29'	Stadium: Ukraina Stadium; Referee: Oleksandr Kalyonov

== Competitions ==
=== Overall ===
Competition	First match	Last match	Starting round	Record							
Competition	First match	Last match	Starting round	Pld	W	D	L	GF	GA	GD	Win %
Premier League	22 July 2018	29 May 2019	Matchday 1	32	8	9	15	44	53	−9	25.00
UPL Relegation play-offs	4 June 2019	8 June 2019	First leg	2	1	1	0	3	0	+3	50.00
Cup	25 September 2018	7 April 2019	Round 3 (1/16)	3	2	1	0	5	1	+4	66.67
Total				37	11	11	15	52	54	−2	29.73

Last updated: 13 June 2019
Source: Competitions

=== Premier League ===
==== League table ====
Pos	Team	Pld	W	D	L	GF	GA	GD	Pts	Qualification or relegation (Note: Teams play each other twice (22 matches), before the league split into two groups (the top six and the bottom six) for the last 10 matches.)
7	Vorskla Poltava	22	9	2	11	18	28	−10	29	Qualification for the Relegation round
8	Desna Chernihiv	22	8	4	10	23	24	−1	28	Qualification for the Relegation round
9	Karpaty Lviv	22	5	6	11	26	37	−11	21	Qualification for the Relegation round
10	Olimpik Donetsk	22	4	8	10	25	33	−8	20	Qualification for the Relegation round
11	Chornomorets Odesa	22	4	4	14	12	34	−22	16	Qualification for the Relegation round

Source: Ukrainian Premier League Soccerway
Rules for classification: 1) Points; 2) Head-to-head points; 3) Head-to-head goal difference; 4) Head-to-head higher number of goals scored; 5) Goal difference; 6) Higher number of goals scored; 7) Draw or "golden match" if tied for title (Article 22, paragraph 3).
Notes:

Teams that placed 10th and 11th in the 2018–19 Ukrainian Premier League play two-leg play-off with the second and third teams of the 2018–19 Ukrainian First League. The draw for play-offs took place on 24 May 2019 and the games will be played on 4 and 8 June 2019.

Team 1	Agg.	Team 2	1st leg	2nd leg
Chornomorets Odesa	0 – 2	Kolos Kovalivka	0 – 0	0 – 2
Karpaty Lviv	3 – 1	Volyn Lutsk	0 – 0	3 – 1

=== First leg ===
4 June 2019
19:00 UTC+3

Chornomorets Odesa	0 – 0	Kolos Kovalivka
	Report

Chornomorets Stadium, Odesa
Attendance: 5,435
Referee: Anatoliy Abdula (Kharkiv)

4 June 2019
19:00 UTC+3

Karpaty Lviv	0 – 0	Volyn Lutsk
	Report

Ukraina Stadium, Lviv
Attendance: 10,104
Referee: Denys Shurman (Vyshneve)

=== Second leg ===
8 June 2019
17:00 UTC+3

Kolos Kovalivka	2 – 0	Chornomorets Odesa
Havrysh 57', 63' (pen.)	Report

Kolos Stadium, Kovalivka
Attendance: 2,500
Referee: Vitaliy Romanov

Kolos Kovalivka won 2–0 on aggregate and were promoted to the 2019–20 Ukrainian Premier League. Chornomorets Odesa were relegated to the 2019–20 Ukrainian First League

8 June 2019
19:00 UTC+3

Volyn Lutsk	0 – 3 ~~1 – 3~~	Karpaty Lviv
Kozhanov 42'	Report	Klyots 37'; Ponde 82' (pen.); Miroshnichenko 90+5'

Avanhard Stadium, Lutsk
Attendance: 5,200
Referee: Maksym Kozyryatskyi

Karpaty Lviv won 3–0 on aggregate and retained their spot in the 2019–20 Ukrainian Premier League. Volyn Lutsk remained in the 2019–20 Ukrainian First League

Due to fan violence at the game and attack on referee, the original score 1–3 was scratched and replaced with technical score 0–3 loss to Volyn and win for Karpaty. Additionally, the Lutsk department of police started criminal proceedings on the fact of intentional damage to property during the game by the Karpaty fans.

==== Relegation round ====
Pos	Team	Pld	W	D	L	GF	GA	GD	Pts	Qualification or relegation
8	Desna Chernihiv	32	12	5	15	35	41	−6	41	
9	Olimpik Donetsk	32	7	13	12	41	48	−7	34	
10	Karpaty Lviv (O)	32	8	9	15	44	53	−9	33	Qualification for the Relegation play-offs
11	Chornomorets Odesa (R)	32	8	7	17	31	49	−18	31	Qualification for the Relegation play-offs
12	Arsenal Kyiv (R, X)	32	7	5	20	26	56	−30	26	Relegated and later withdrawn

Source: Ukrainian Premier League (in Ukrainian), UEFA, Soccerway
Rules for classification: 1) Points; 2) Head-to-head points; 3) Head-to-head goal difference; 4) Head-to-head higher number of goals scored; 5) Goal difference; 6) Higher number of goals scored; 7) Draw or "golden match" if tied for title (Article 22, paragraph 3).
(O) Play-off winners; (R) Relegated; (X) Withdrew

Teams that placed 10th and 11th in the 2018–19 Ukrainian Premier League play two-leg play-off with the second and third teams of the 2018–19 Ukrainian First League. The draw for play-offs took place on 24 May 2019 and the games will be played on 4 and 8 June 2019.

Team 1	Agg.	Team 2	1st leg	2nd leg
Chornomorets Odesa	0 – 2	Kolos Kovalivka	0 – 0	0 – 2
Karpaty Lviv	3 – 1	Volyn Lutsk	0 – 0	3 – 1

=== First leg ===
4 June 2019
19:00 UTC+3

Chornomorets Odesa	0 – 0	Kolos Kovalivka
	Report

Chornomorets Stadium, Odesa
Attendance: 5,435
Referee: Anatoliy Abdula (Kharkiv)

4 June 2019
19:00 UTC+3

Karpaty Lviv	0 – 0	Volyn Lutsk
	Report

Ukraina Stadium, Lviv
Attendance: 10,104
Referee: Denys Shurman (Vyshneve)

=== Second leg ===
8 June 2019
17:00 UTC+3

Kolos Kovalivka	2 – 0	Chornomorets Odesa
Havrysh 57', 63' (pen.)	Report

Kolos Stadium, Kovalivka
Attendance: 2,500
Referee: Vitaliy Romanov

Kolos Kovalivka won 2–0 on aggregate and were promoted to the 2019–20 Ukrainian Premier League. Chornomorets Odesa were relegated to the 2019–20 Ukrainian First League

8 June 2019
19:00 UTC+3

Volyn Lutsk	0 – 3 ~~1 – 3~~	Karpaty Lviv
Kozhanov 42'	Report	Klyots 37'; Ponde 82' (pen.); Miroshnichenko 90+5'

Avanhard Stadium, Lutsk
Attendance: 5,200
Referee: Maksym Kozyryatskyi

Karpaty Lviv won 3–0 on aggregate and retained their spot in the 2019–20 Ukrainian Premier League. Volyn Lutsk remained in the 2019–20 Ukrainian First League

Due to fan violence at the game and attack on referee, the original score 1–3 was scratched and replaced with technical score 0–3 loss to Volyn and win for Karpaty. Additionally, the Lutsk department of police started criminal proceedings on the fact of intentional damage to property during the game by the Karpaty fans.

==== Results summary ====
Overall								Home						Away					
Pld	W	D	L	GF	GA	GD	Pts	W	D	L	GF	GA	GD	W	D	L	GF	GA	GD
32	8	9	15	44	53	−9	33	3	4	9	16	27	−11	5	5	6	28	26	+2

Last updated: 29 May 2019.
Source: Competitive matches

==== Results by round ====
Round	1	2	3	4	5	6	7	8	9	10	11	12	13	14	15	16	17	18	19	20	21	22	23	24	25	26	27	28	29	30	31	32
Ground	H	H	H	H	A	H	A	H	A	H	A	A	A	A	A	H	A	H	A	H	A	H	H	A	H	A	H	A	H	A	H	A
Result	L	W	D	L	D	L	W	L	D	L	D	L	W	W	L	L	D	L	W	L	L	D	W	L	D	L	L	D	W	L	D	W
Position	12	9	7	8	8	10	8	10	10	11	10	10	10	9	9	10	10	10	9	9	9	9	9	9	9	10	10	10	10	10	10	10

Updated to match(es) played on 29 May 2019. Source: Competitive matches
A = Away; H = Home; W = Win; D = Draw; L = Loss

==== Matches ====
22 July 2018 1	Karpaty Lviv	0 – 2	FC Oleksandriya	Lviv
17:00 EEST (UTC+03:00)	Carrascal (yellow card) 16'; Holodyuk (yellow card) 40'	Report	Banada (yellow card) 18'; Tsurikov 72'; Ponomar 81'; Zaderaka (yellow card) 82'	Stadium: Ukraina Stadium; Attendance: 6,796; Referee: Dmytro Kutakov

29 July 2018 2	Karpaty Lviv	1 – 0	Chornomorets Odesa	Lviv
17:00 EEST (UTC+03:00)	Shved 16'; Kuchynskyi (yellow card) 90+4'	Report	Savchenko (yellow card) 36'; Babenko (yellow card) 51'	Stadium: Ukraina Stadium; Attendance: 2,850; Referee: Denys Shurman

5 August 2018 3	Karpaty Lviv	2 – 2	Olimpik Donetsk	Lviv
17:00 EEST (UTC+03:00)	Lebedenko (yellow card) 19'; Di Franco 32', (yellow card) 71'; Shved 36'; Boroday (yellow card) 78'	Report	Kravchenko 58'; Y.Pasich (yellow card) 68'; Troyanovskyi (yellow card) 81'; Do Couto 86'	Stadium: Ukraina Stadium; Attendance: 3,745; Referee: Volodymyr Novokhatniy

12 August 2018 4	Karpaty Lviv	0 – 1	Zorya Luhansk	Lviv
17:00 EEST (UTC+03:00)	Lebedenko (yellow card) 81'; Méndez (yellow card) 90+5'	Report	Svatok (yellow card) 25'; Mykhaylychenko (yellow card) 75'; Kharatin 77'; Khomchenovskyi (yellow card) 90+5'	Stadium: Ukraina Stadium; Attendance: 5,352; Referee: Mykola Kryvonosov

19 August 2018 5	Desna Chernihiv	2 – 2	Karpaty Lviv	Chernihiv
17:00 EEST (UTC+03:00)	Bezborodko 25'; Koberidze (yellow card) 39'; D.Favorov 42'	Report	Erbes (yellow card) 20'; Miroshnichenko 58'; Carrascal (yellow card) 62'; Mehremić 80'	Stadium: Chernihiv Stadium; Attendance: 4,188; Referee: Dmytro Bondarenko

26 August 2018 6	Karpaty Lviv	1 – 2	Arsenal Kyiv	Lviv
19:30 EEST (UTC+03:00)	Miroshnichenko (yellow card) 24'; Mehremić (yellow card) 39'; Erbes 55'	Report	Orikhovskyi 27', (yellow card) 29'; Hryn 39'; Jevtoski (yellow card) 41'; Dubinchak (yellow card) 51'; Sitalo (yellow card) 80'; Piris (red card) 84'; Sahutkin (yellow card) 89'	Stadium: Ukraina Stadium; Attendance: 1,525; Referee: Viktor Kopiievskyi

2 September 2018 7	Dynamo Kyiv	0 – 2	Karpaty Lviv	Kyiv
19:30 EEST (UTC+03:00)	Burda (yellow card) 75'; Kalitvintsev (yellow card) 86'	Report	Shved 17', 45+1'; Mehremić (yellow card) 26' (yellow-red card) 55'; Carrascal (yellow card) 46'; Hutsulyak (yellow card) 75'; Verbnyi (yellow card) 81'; Kuchynskyi (yellow card) 88'	Stadium: Olympic Stadium; Attendance: 10,700; Referee: Oleksandr Derdo

15 September 2018 8	Karpaty Lviv	0 – 1	Vorskla Poltava	Lviv
17:00 EEST (UTC+03:00)	Di Franco (yellow card) 21'; Carrascal (yellow card) 27'; Fedetskyi (yellow card) 62'; William (yellow card) 73'	Report	Dallku (yellow card) 18', (goal) 90+1'; Sharpar (yellow card) 42'	Stadium: Ukraina Stadium; Attendance: 1,756; Referee: Mykola Balakin

22 September 2018 9	FC Lviv	1 – 1	Karpaty Lviv	Lviv
17:00 EEST (UTC+03:00)	Bruno (yellow card) 23', (goal) 78'; Kalenchuk (yellow card) 40'; Taylor (yellow card) 54'	Report	Fedetskyi (yellow card) 58'; Myakushko 74'; Di Franco (yellow card) 85'; Mehremić (yellow card) 90+4'	Stadium: Arena Lviv; Attendance: 8,723; Referee: Anatoliy Abdula

28 September 2018 10	Karpaty Lviv	1 – 6	Shakhtar Donetsk	Lviv
19:00 EEST (UTC+03:00)	Kovtun (yellow card) 32'; Mehremić (yellow card) 60'; Boroday (yellow card) 63'; Erbes (yellow card) 67'; Shved 90+2'	Report	Rakitskiy 13', (yellow card) 65'; Fernando 26'; Moraes 29'; Maycon (yellow card) 31'; Marlos 35'; Boroday 45+1' (o.g.); Matviyenko 79'	Stadium: Ukraina Stadium; Attendance: 9,127; Referee: Viktor Kopiievskyi

6 October 2018 11	FC Mariupol	1 – 1	Karpaty Lviv	Mariupol
14:00 EEST (UTC+03:00)	Bykov (yellow card) 12'; Demiri (yellow card) 22'; Churko (yellow card) 42'; Boryachuk 52'; Myshnyov (yellow card) 88'; Tyschenko (yellow card) 90+6'	Report	Fedetskyi (yellow card) 9'; Hutsulyak 13'; Erbes (yellow card) 74'	Stadium: Volodymyr Boiko Stadium; Attendance: 2,120; Referee: Denys Shurman

21 October 2018 12	FC Oleksandriya	2 – 1	Karpaty Lviv	Oleksandriia
19:30 EEST (UTC+03:00)	Shastal 11'; Kovalets 41'; Zaporozhan (yellow card) 74'; Shendrik (yellow card) 90+3'	Report	Carrascal (yellow card) 17'; Boroday (yellow card) 23'; Hutsulyak 54', (yellow card) 67'; Fedetskyi (yellow card) 90+2'; Di Franco (yellow card) 90+2'	Stadium: Nika Stadium; Attendance: 1,606; Referee: Kateryna Monzul

28 October 2018 13	Chornomorets Odesa	0 – 5	Karpaty Lviv	Odesa
14:00 EET (UTC+02:00)	Hrachov (yellow card) 1'; Trubochkin (yellow card) 47'; Shtohrin (yellow card) 88'	Report	Shved 2' (pen.); Mehremić (yellow card) 21'; Ponde (yellow card) 28', (goal) 48'; Myakushko 78', 90+4'; Klyots (yellow card) 81'; Hutsulyak 90+6'	Stadium: Chornomorets Stadium; Attendance: 4,860; Referee: Dmytro Kryvushkin

3 November 2018 14	Olimpik Donetsk	1 – 2	Karpaty Lviv	Kyiv
19:30 EET (UTC+02:00)	Politylo (yellow card) 22'; Vakulenko (yellow card) 29'; Shynder (yellow card) 52'; Makhnovskyi (yellow card) 74'; Y.Pasich 90+1'	Report	Ponde 5', (yellow card) 36'; Carrascal (yellow card) 23'; Kovtun (yellow card) 65'; Shved 73' (pen.); Shevchenko (yellow card) 87'; Erbes (yellow card) 90+1'	Stadium: Valeriy Lobanovskyi Dynamo Stadium; Attendance: 1,050; Referee: Ihor Paskhal

10 November 2018 15	Zorya Luhansk	2 – 1	Karpaty Lviv	Zaporizhia
17:00 EET (UTC+02:00)	Khomchenovskyi 16'; Silas (yellow card) 66'; Hordiyenko 70'; Kharatin (yellow card) 90+1'; Tymchyk (yellow card) 90+3'	Report	Shved 34'; Ponde (yellow card) 50'; Miroshnichenko (yellow card) 68'; Carrascal (yellow card) 76'	Stadium: Slavutych-Arena; Attendance: 1,815; Referee: Denys Shurman

24 November 2018 16	Karpaty Lviv	0 – 2	Desna Chernihiv	Lviv
14:00 EET (UTC+02:00)	Boroday (yellow card) 39' (yellow-red card) 51'; Méndez (yellow card) 90+1'	Report	Filippov 27'; Starenkyi 43'; Ohirya (yellow card) 86'	Stadium: Ukraina Stadium; Attendance: 1,361; Referee: Kostiantyn Trukhanov

1 December 2018 17	Arsenal Kyiv	1 – 1	Karpaty Lviv	Kyiv
17:00 EET (UTC+02:00)	Gueye 24' (o.g.); Jevtoski (yellow card) 62'; Akulinin (yellow card) 71'	Report	Erbes (yellow card) 15'; Gueye (yellow card) 50'; Miroshnichenko (yellow card) 51'; Fedetskyi (yellow card) 62'; Hutsulyak 72' (pen.); Klyots (yellow card) 85'	Stadium: Valeriy Lobanovskyi Dynamo Stadium; Attendance: 232; Referee: Kateryna Monzul

8 December 2018 18	Karpaty Lviv	0 – 4	Dynamo Kyiv	Lviv
14:00 EET (UTC+02:00)	Erbes (yellow card) 3'; Mehremić (yellow card) 26'; Gueye (yellow card) 54'; Hutsulyak (yellow card) 56'; Di Franco (yellow card) 75'	Report	Besyedin (yellow card) 15'; Tsyhankov 28', 49', 90+1'; Shaparenko (yellow card) 30', (goal) 89'; Shepelyev (yellow card) 37'; Verbič (yellow card) 61'	Stadium: Ukraina Stadium; Attendance: 2,756; Referee: Oleksandr Omelchenko

24 February 2019 19	Vorskla Poltava	0 – 4	Karpaty Lviv	Poltava
17:00 EET (UTC+02:00)	Taraduda (yellow card) 47'; Sklyar (yellow card) 73'; Šehić (yellow card) 85'; Kolomoyets (yellow card) 89'	Report	Debelko (yellow card) 7'; Di Franco 25', (yellow card) 71'; Shved 51' (pen.), 55', 90+1'; Hutsulyak (yellow card) 60'; Gueye (yellow card) 85'	Stadium: Oleksiy Butovsky Vorskla Stadium; Attendance: 1,115; Referee: Kostiantyn Trukhanov

3 March 2019 20	Karpaty Lviv	0 – 1	FC Lviv	Lviv
17:00 EET (UTC+02:00)	Slyva (yellow card) 24'; Gueye (yellow card) 32'; Di Franco (yellow card) 38'; Myakushko (yellow card) 72'	Report	Mehremić 35' (o.g.); Marthã (yellow card) 38'; Pryimak (yellow card) 44'; Bruno (yellow card) 90+5'; Bandura (yellow card) 90+10'	Stadium: Ukraina Stadium; Attendance: 12,252; Referee: Yuriy Mozharovskyi

10 March 2019 21	Shakhtar Donetsk	5 – 0	Karpaty Lviv	Kharkiv
17:00 EET (UTC+02:00)	Kovalenko 6', 64'; Matviyenko 34'; Maycon 44'; Khocholava (yellow card) 63'; Ismaily (yellow card) 70'; Taison 79'	Report	Hongla (yellow card) 52' (yellow-red card) 77'; Myakushko (yellow card) 54'; Mehremić (yellow card) 60'	Stadium: Metalist Stadium; Attendance: 4,746; Referee: Denys Shurman

17 March 2019 22	Karpaty Lviv	1 – 1	FC Mariupol	Lviv
17:00 EET (UTC+02:00)	Ponde 32'; Hutsulyak (yellow card) 45'; Tolochko (yellow card) 51'; Debelko (yellow card) 73'; Di Franco (yellow card) 86'	Report	Zubkov 9', (yellow card) 90+2'; Demiri (yellow card) 14'; Myshnyov (yellow card) 21'; Yavorskyi (yellow card) 41'	Stadium: Ukraina Stadium; Attendance: 3,623; Referee: Viktor Kopiievskyi

==== Relegation round ====
2 April 2019 23	Karpaty Lviv	4 – 0	Vorskla Poltava	Lviv
17:00 EEST (UTC+03:00)	Ponde 26'; Shved 38', 62'; Myakushko (yellow card) 59'; Yoda 70' (pen.)	Report	Chesnakov (yellow card) 60'; Perduta (yellow card) 90+2'	Stadium: Ukraina Stadium; Attendance: 2,231; Referee: Dmytro Kryvushkin

14 April 2019 24	Desna Chernihiv	2 – 1	Karpaty Lviv	Chernihiv
14:00 EEST (UTC+03:00)	Kartushov 8'; A.Favorov (yellow card) 29'; D.Favorov 72' (pen.)	Report	Shved 19'; Hongla (yellow card) 83'	Stadium: Chernihiv Stadium; Attendance: 2,861; Referee: Kateryna Monzul

23 April 2019 25	Karpaty Lviv	0 – 0	Chornomorets Odesa	Lviv
18:00 EEST (UTC+03:00)	Méndez (yellow card) 89'; Di Franco (yellow card) 90+1'	Report	Tanchyk (yellow card) 39'; Hrachov (yellow card) 43'; Morozenko (yellow card) 51'	Stadium: Ukraina Stadium; Attendance: 1,663; Referee: Mykola Balakin

27 April 2019 26	Olimpik Donetsk	3 – 2	Karpaty Lviv	Kyiv
17:00 EEST (UTC+03:00)	H.Pasich 9'; Dehtyarev 83'; Dieye 84'; Valeyev (yellow card) 90+1'	Report	Sandokhadze (yellow card) 24'; Di Franco 36'; Nesterov (yellow card) 46'; Ponde 54'	Stadium: Valeriy Lobanovskyi Dynamo Stadium; Attendance: 435; Referee: Denys Shurman

5 May 2019 27	Karpaty Lviv	1 – 2	Arsenal Kyiv	Lviv
17:00 EEST (UTC+03:00)	Yoda (yellow card) 12'; Shved (yellow card) 12' (yellow-red card) 45+3'; Di Franco (yellow card) 45'; Hongla 82'; Mehremić (yellow card) 90+5'	Report	Vakulenko 10'; Tankovskyi (yellow card) 45'; Bashlay (yellow card) 45+4'; Orikhovskyi (yellow card) 72'; Kovpak 74'	Stadium: Ukraina Stadium; Attendance: 1,650; Referee: Oleksandr Omelchenko

12 May 2019 28	Vorskla Poltava	1 – 1	Karpaty Lviv	Poltava
19:30 EEST (UTC+03:00)	Rebenok 15'; Sharpar (yellow card) 24'; Šehić (yellow card) 65'	Report	Sandokhadze (yellow card) 34'; Di Franco (yellow card) 54'; Mehremić (yellow card) 85'; Debelko 88'	Stadium: Oleksiy Butovsky Vorskla Stadium; Attendance: 1,419; Referee: Serhiy Boyko

18 May 2019 29	Karpaty Lviv	2 – 0	Desna Chernihiv	Lviv
17:00 EEST (UTC+03:00)	Yoda (yellow card) 49', (red card) 49'; Ponde 52', (yellow card) 63'; Myakushko 77'; Nesterov (yellow card) 86'	Report	A.Favorov (yellow card) 24'; D.Favorov (yellow card) 51'; Ohirya (yellow card) 76'	Stadium: Ukraina Stadium; Attendance: 777; Referee: Maksym Kozyryatskyi

21 May 2019 30	Chornomorets Odesa	3 – 1	Karpaty Lviv	Odesa
17:00 EEST (UTC+03:00)	Vilhjálmsson 9'; Pavlov 75', (yellow card) 79'; Ryzhuk 83'	Report	Kovtun (yellow card) 3'; Myakushko 74' (pen.)	Stadium: Chornomorets Stadium; Attendance: 3,982; Referee: Vitaliy Romanov

25 May 2019 31	Karpaty Lviv	3 – 3	Olimpik Donetsk	Lviv
17:00 EEST (UTC+03:00)	Hongla 15'; Myakushko 75', 77' (pen.); Ponde (yellow card) 85'	Report	Dieye 2', 89', (yellow card) 89'; Gai 82'	Stadium: Ukraina Stadium; Attendance: 1,425; Referee: Kostiantyn Trukhanov

29 May 2019 32	Arsenal Kyiv	2 – 3	Karpaty Lviv	Kyiv
17:00 EEST (UTC+03:00)	Kovpak 4'; Orikhovskyi (yellow card) 47'; Yanakov (yellow card) 82'; Avahimyan 90+2'	Report	Kovtun (yellow card) 16'; Nesterov 18'; Myakushko 20' (pen.); Klyots (yellow card) 44'; Miroshnichenko 45+2'; Ponde (yellow card) 69'; Fedetskyi (yellow card) 76'	Stadium: Valeriy Lobanovskyi Dynamo Stadium; Attendance: 433; Referee: Yaroslav Kozyk

==== Relegation play-offs ====
4 June 2019 First leg	Karpaty Lviv	0 – 0	Volyn Lutsk	Lviv
19:00 EEST (UTC+03:00)	Busko (yellow card) 45+1'; Fedetskyi (yellow card) 47'; Hongla (yellow card) 55'; Slyva (yellow card) 90+3'; Klyots (yellow card) 90+5'	Report	Siminin (yellow card) 4'; Tsyupa (yellow card) 24'; Boldenkov (yellow card) 76'	Stadium: Ukraina Stadium; Attendance: 10,104; Referee: Denys Shurman

8 June 2019 Second leg	Volyn Lutsk	0 – 3^{[a]} (0 – 3 agg.)	Karpaty Lviv	Lutsk
19:00 EEST (UTC+03:00)	Kozhanov 42'; Siminin (red card) 70'; Petko (yellow card) 84'; Bohomaz (yellow card) 90+4'; Boldenkov (yellow card) 90+5'	Report	Klyots 37'; Mehremić (yellow card) 47'; Hongla (yellow card) 52'; Myakushko (yellow card) 77'; Ponde 82' (pen.); Kuchynskyi (yellow card) 90+3'; Miroshnichenko 90+5'	Stadium: Avanhard Stadium; Attendance: 5,200; Referee: Maksym Kozyryatskyi

- ^{a} Match was abandoned after 90+6 minutes as Karpaty lead 1–3 due to Volyn fans assaulting the referee. UAF awarded Karpaty a 3–0 win and ordered Volyn to play their next home game behind closed doors.

=== Ukrainian Cup ===
25 September 2018 Round of 20 (1/16)	PFC Sumy	0 – 3	Karpaty Lviv	Sumy
18:30 EEST (UTC+03:00)		Report	Kovtun (yellow card) 25'; Vargas (yellow card) 29', (goal) 57'; Holodyuk 33'; Hutsulyak 73'; Lebedenko (yellow card) 82'	Stadium: Yuvileiny Stadium; Attendance: 1,400; Referee: Dmytro Kryvushkin

31 October 2018 Round of 16 (1/8)	Cherkashchyna-Akademiya Bilozirya	0 – 1	Karpaty Lviv	Cherkasy
18:00 EET (UTC+02:00)	Boyko (yellow card) 80'	Report	Ponde 80', (yellow card) 90'	Stadium: Tsentralnyi Stadion; Attendance: 1,512; Referee: Andriy Kovalenko

7 April 2019 Quarter-finals	Inhulets Petrove	1 – 1 (5 – 4 p)	Karpaty Lviv	Oleksandriia
14:00 EEST (UTC+03:00)	Schedryi 50'; Zaporozhets (yellow card) 54'; Mishurenko (yellow card) 83'; Pidnebennoy (yellow card) 106'; Balan (yellow card) 120'	Report	Di Franco (yellow card) 31'; Hutsulyak (yellow card) 54'; Gueye (yellow card) 65'; Shved 90+6'; Tolochko (yellow card) 93' (yellow-red card) 100'; Vargas (yellow card) 103'; Hongla (yellow card) 106'	Stadium: Nika Stadium; Attendance: 850; Referee: Yevhen Aranovskyi
	Penalties
	Kovalyov (penalty scored); Synyohub (penalty scored); Pidnebennoy (penalty scored); Kozak (penalty scored); Sula (penalty scored)		(penalty scored) Hutsulyak; (penalty scored) Myakushko; (penalty scored) Hongla; (penalty missed) Yoda; (penalty scored) Vargas

== Statistics ==
=== Appearances and goals ===
No.	Pos	Nat	Player	Total		Premier League		Cup		Play-offs	
No.	Pos	Nat	Player	Apps	Goals	Apps	Goals	Apps	Goals	Apps	Goals
Goalkeepers
1	GK	(Ukraine) UKR	Maksym Kuchynskyi	26	0	22	0	2	0	2	0
71	GK	(Ukraine) UKR	Herman Penkov	2	0	2	0	0	0	0	0
Defenders
4	DF	(Georgia (country)) GEO	Nika Sandokhadze	10	0	9	0	0+1	0	0	0
5	DF	(Ukraine) UKR	Andriy Nesterov	6	1	5+1	1	0	0	0	0
19	DF	(Senegal) SEN	Papa Gueye	15	0	12+2	0	1	0	0	0
44	DF	(Ukraine) UKR	Artem Fedetskyi	17	0	12+2	0	1	0	2	0
47	DF	(Ukraine) UKR	Petro Kharzhevskyi	1	0	0+1	0	0	0	0	0
49	DF	(Ukraine) UKR	Roman Slyva	4	0	2+1	0	0	0	0+1	0
50	DF	(Ukraine) UKR	Oleksiy Kovtun	20	0	16	0	2	0	2	0
94	DF	(Ukraine) UKR	Denys Miroshnichenko	23	3	18+3	2	1	0	1	1
99	DF	(Bosnia and Herzegovina) BIH	Adi Mehremić	28	1	22+1	1	3	0	2	0
Midfielders
20	MF	(Argentina) ARG	Francisco Di Franco	34	3	26+3	3	2+1	0	2	0
22	MF	(Ukraine) UKR	Andriy Busko	11	0	5+4	0	0	0	1+1	0
29	MF	(Cameroon) CMR	Martin Hongla	16	2	13	2	1	0	2	0
33	MF	(Ukraine) UKR	Serhiy Myakushko	36	8	26+6	8	1+1	0	2	0
48	MF	(Ukraine) UKR	Dmytro Klyots	25	1	19+2	0	0+2	0	2	1
68	MF	(Ukraine) UKR	Roman Tolochko	8	0	4+3	0	0+1	0	0	0
74	MF	(France) FRA	Karim Yoda	11	1	8+2	1	1	0	0	0
Forwards
9	FW	(Ukraine) UKR	Oleksiy Hutsulyak	33	5	20+8	4	2+1	1	2	0
10	FW	(Portugal) POR	Cristian Ponde	26	8	14+7	6	3	1	2	1
11	FW	(Uruguay) URU	Kevin Méndez	15	0	2+11	0	1	0	0+1	0
17	FW	(Ukraine) UKR	Roman Debelko	14	1	3+9	1	0	0	0+2	0
77	FW	(Brazil) BRA	William De Camargo	1	0	0+1	0	0	0	0	0
Players transferred out during the season
8	MF	(Ukraine) UKR	Nazar Verbnyi	9	0	5+3	0	1	0	0	0
10	MF	(Colombia) COL	Jorge Carrascal	18	0	14+2	0	2	0	0	0
17	MF	(Ukraine) UKR	Oleh Holodyuk	6	1	4+1	0	1	1	0	0
18	FW	(Bolivia) BOL	Rodrigo Vargas	15	1	2+11	0	1+1	1	0	0
21	MF	(Argentina) ARG	Cristian Erbes	16	1	13+2	1	1	0	0	0
30	GK	(Ukraine) UKR	Mykyta Shevchenko	9	0	8	0	1	0	0	0
32	FW	(Argentina) ARG	Catriel Sánchez	2	0	0+1	0	0+1	0	0	0
35	FW	(Ukraine) UKR	Maryan Shved	26	15	24	14	2	1	0	0
54	DF	(Ukraine) UKR	Orest Lebedenko	15	0	12+1	0	2	0	0	0
57	DF	(Ukraine) UKR	Oleh Boroday	13	0	9+3	0	1	0	0	0
70	DF	(Ukraine) UKR	Ivan Lobay	1	0	1	0	0	0	0	0
95	FW	(Ukraine) UKR	Danylo Sikan	1	0	0+1	0	0	0	0	0

Source: Competitions

Last updated: 8 June 2019

=== Goalscorers ===
Rank	No.	Pos	Nat	Name	Premier League	Cup	Play-offs	Total
1	35	FW	(Ukraine)	Maryan Shved	14	1	0	15
2	33	MF	(Ukraine)	Serhiy Myakushko	8	0	0	8
	10	FW	(Portugal)	Cristian Ponde	6	1	1	8
4	9	FW	(Ukraine)	Oleksiy Hutsulyak	4	1	0	5
5	20	FW	(Argentina)	Francisco Di Franco	3	0	0	3
	94	DF	(Ukraine)	Denys Miroshnichenko	2	0	1	3
7	29	MF	(Cameroon)	Martin Hongla	2	0	0	2
8	99	DF	(Bosnia and Herzegovina)	Adi Mehremić	1	0	0	1
	21	MF	(Argentina)	Cristian Erbes	1	0	0	1
	17	MF	(Ukraine)	Oleh Holodyuk	0	1	0	1
	18	FW	(Bolivia)	Rodrigo Vargas	0	1	0	1
	74	MF	(France)	Karim Yoda	1	0	0	1
	17	FW	(Ukraine)	Roman Debelko	1	0	0	1
	5	DF	(Ukraine)	Andriy Nesterov	1	0	0	1
	48	MF	(Ukraine)	Dmytro Klyots	0	0	1	1
				Total	44	5	3	52

Last updated: 8 June 2019

=== Clean sheets ===
Rank	No.	Pos	Nat	Name	Premier League	Cup	Play-offs	Total
1	1	GK	(Ukraine)	Maksym Kuchynskyi	6	1	1	8
2	30	GK	(Ukraine)	Mykyta Shevchenko	1	1	0	2
				Total	7	2	1	10

Last updated: 4 June 2019

=== Disciplinary record ===
No.	Pos	Nat	Player	Premier League			Cup			Play-offs			Total		
No.	Pos	Nat	Player	Yellow card	(yellow card) (yellow-red card)	Red card	Yellow card	(yellow card) (yellow-red card)	Red card	Yellow card	(yellow card) (yellow-red card)	Red card	Yellow card	(yellow card) (yellow-red card)	Red card
1	GK	(Ukraine)	Maksym Kuchynskyi	2	0	0	0	0	0	1	0	0	3	0	0
4	DF	(Georgia (country))	Nika Sandokhadze	2	0	0	0	0	0	0	0	0	2	0	0
5	DF	(Ukraine)	Andriy Nesterov	2	0	0	0	0	0	0	0	0	2	0	0
8	MF	(Ukraine)	Nazar Verbnyi	1	0	0	0	0	0	0	0	0	1	0	0
9	FW	(Ukraine)	Oleksiy Hutsulyak	5	0	0	1	0	0	0	0	0	6	0	0
10	MF	(Colombia)	Jorge Carrascal	7	0	0	0	0	0	0	0	0	7	0	0
10	FW	(Portugal)	Cristian Ponde	6	0	0	1	0	0	0	0	0	7	0	0
11	FW	(Uruguay)	Kevin Méndez	3	0	0	0	0	0	0	0	0	3	0	0
17	MF	(Ukraine)	Oleh Holodyuk	1	0	0	0	0	0	0	0	0	1	0	0
17	FW	(Ukraine)	Roman Debelko	2	0	0	0	0	0	0	0	0	2	0	0
18	FW	(Bolivia)	Rodrigo Vargas	0	0	0	2	0	0	0	0	0	2	0	0
19	DF	(Senegal)	Papa Gueye	4	0	0	1	0	0	0	0	0	5	0	0
20	MF	(Argentina)	Francisco Di Franco	11	0	0	1	0	0	0	0	0	12	0	0
21	MF	(Argentina)	Cristian Erbes	6	0	0	0	0	0	0	0	0	6	0	0
22	MF	(Ukraine)	Andriy Busko	0	0	0	0	0	0	1	0	0	1	0	0
29	MF	(Cameroon)	Martin Hongla	1	1	0	1	0	0	2	0	0	4	1	0
30	GK	(Ukraine)	Mykyta Shevchenko	1	0	0	0	0	0	0	0	0	1	0	0
33	MF	(Ukraine)	Serhiy Myakushko	3	0	0	0	0	0	1	0	0	4	0	0
35	FW	(Ukraine)	Maryan Shved	0	1	0	0	0	0	0	0	0	0	1	0
44	DF	(Ukraine)	Artem Fedetskyi	6	0	0	0	0	0	1	0	0	7	0	0
48	MF	(Ukraine)	Dmytro Klyots	3	0	0	0	0	0	1	0	0	4	0	0
49	DF	(Ukraine)	Roman Slyva	1	0	0	0	0	0	1	0	0	2	0	0
50	DF	(Ukraine)	Oleksiy Kovtun	4	0	0	1	0	0	0	0	0	5	0	0
54	DF	(Ukraine)	Orest Lebedenko	2	0	0	1	0	0	0	0	0	3	0	0
57	DF	(Ukraine)	Oleh Boroday	3	1	0	0	0	0	0	0	0	3	1	0
68	MF	(Ukraine)	Roman Tolochko	1	0	0	0	1	0	0	0	0	1	1	0
74	MF	(France)	Karim Yoda	2	0	1	0	0	0	0	0	0	2	0	1
77	FW	(Brazil)	William De Camargo	1	0	0	0	0	0	0	0	0	1	0	0
94	DF	(Ukraine)	Denys Miroshnichenko	3	0	0	0	0	0	0	0	0	3	0	0
99	DF	(Bosnia and Herzegovina)	Adi Mehremić	8	1	0	0	0	0	1	0	0	9	1	0
			Total	88	3	1	9	1	0	9	0	0	106	4	1

Last updated: 8 June 2019
