= Tolochko =

Tolochko is a surname. Notable people with the surname include:

- Petro Tolochko (1938–2024), Soviet and Ukrainian historian, archaeologist, and political activist
- Roman Tolochko (born 1998), Ukrainian footballer
