= Oleksiy Kovtun =

Ukrainian footballer

Personal information
- Full name: Oleksiy Oleksandrovych Kovtun
- Date of birth: 5 February 1995 (age 31)
- Place of birth: Kyiv, Ukraine
- Height: 1.85 m (6 ft 1 in)
- Position: Defender

Team information
- Current team: SR Donaufeld Wien
- Number: 3

Youth career
- 2008–2012: Dynamo Kyiv

Senior career*
Years	Team	Apps	(Gls)
2012–2013	Dynamo Kyiv	0	(0)
2013–2015	Metalist Kharkiv	1	(0)
2015–2017	Poltava	69	(2)
2018	Minsk	5	(0)
2018–2019	Karpaty Lviv	22	(0)
2020	Rukh Brest	17	(1)
2021	Mynai	4	(0)
2021–2022	Desna Chernihiv	4	(0)
2023–2024	Keflavík	38	(3)
2025–	SR Donaufeld Wien	53	(3)

International career^{‡}
2015	Ukraine U20	2	(0)
- * Club domestic league appearances and goals as of 7 November 2026 ‡ National team caps and goals as of 10 September 2021

Oleksiy Oleksandrovych Kovtun (Ukrainian: Олексій Олександрович Ковтун; born 5 February 1995) is a Ukrainian professional footballer who plays as a defender for SR Donaufeld in Austria.

== Career ==
Kovtun is a product of the FC Dynamo School System. As part of the Kievites, he spent four seasons in the youth football league. According to the results of the 2011/12 championship, he was recognized as the best defender of the U-17 tournament. After completing his studies for half a season, he played for the Kievites in the first ever Ukrainian Championship among 19-year-olds

=== Metalist Kharkiv ===
After which he continued his career in Metalist Kharkiv. He made his debut for FC Metalist in the match against FC Dynamo Kyiv on 1 March 2015 in the Ukrainian Premier League.

=== Poltava ===
At the end of August 2015 he moved to Poltava, in which he made his debut on August 30 in an away match against Dynamo-2, replacing Dmitry Shastal in the 46th minute of the meeting. On 27 May 2016 he scored away on the victory against Hirnyk-Sport Horishni Plavni in the season 2015–16 in Ukrainian First League. On 3 May 2017 he scored against Helios Kharkiv in Ukrainian First League in the season 2015–16. On 21 September 2016 he scored in Ukrainian Cup against Zirka Kropyvnytskyi and on 26 October 2016 against Karpaty Lviv in the season 2016-17.

=== Karpaty Lviv ===
In summer 2018 he moved from FC Minsk to Karpaty Lviv in Ukrainian Premier League.

=== Rukh Brest ===
In 2020 he moved to Rukh Brest, in Belarusian Premier League, where in the season 2020 Belarusian Premier League, he got 8th place in the league with the team and played 17 games scoring 1 goal against Dinamo Minsk giving the victory for 0–1 away for Rukh Brest at Traktor Stadium.

=== Mynai ===
On 21 January 2021 he moved from Rukh Brest to Mynai in Ukrainian Premier League where he played 4 games.

=== Desna Chernihiv ===
In September 2021 he moved to Desna Chernihiv the first team of Chernihiv in Ukrainian Premier League. The club took Kovtun in order to reinforce the defense. Kovtun will perform with six number and the details of the contract are not reported. On 12 September 2021 he made his debit against Vorskla Poltava at the Butovsky Vorskla Stadium replacing Serhiy Bolbat at the 89 minute. On 21 September 2021 he played against Metalist Kharkiv in Ukrainian Cup in the season 2021-22. On 15 November 2021 he played against Olimpik Donetsk in the friendly match at the Bannikov Stadium in Kyiv. In January 2022, he ended his contract with the club of Chernihiv.

=== Keflavík ===
In April 2023 he moved to Keflavík in Besta deild karla.

=== Donaufeld Wien ===
In February 2025 he signed for Donaufeld Wien, where he won the Austrian Regionalliga.

== Career statistics ==
=== Club ===
As of match played 7 November 2026

Appearances and goals by club, season and competition
Club	Season	League			Cup		Europe		Other		Total	
Club	Season	Division	Apps	Goals	Apps	Goals	Apps	Goals	Apps	Goals	Apps	Goals
Poltava	2015–16	Ukrainian First League	23	1	0	0	0	0	0	0	23	1
Poltava	2016–17	Ukrainian First League	31	1	2	2	0	0	0	0	33	3
Poltava	2017–18	Ukrainian First League	15	0	0	0	0	0	0	0	15	0
Minsk	2018	Belarusian Premier League	5	0	0	0	0	0	0	0	5	0
Karpaty Lviv	2018–19	Ukrainian Premier League	16	0	2	0	0	0	0	0	18	0
Karpaty Lviv	2019–20	Ukrainian Premier League	6	0	0	0	0	0	0	0	6	0
Rukh Brest	2020	Belarusian Premier League	17	1	2	0	0	0	0	0	19	1
Mynai	2020–21	Ukrainian Premier League	4	0	0	0	0	0	0	0	4	0
Desna Chernihiv	2021–22	Ukrainian Premier League	4	0	1	0	0	0	1	0	6	0
Keflavík	2023	Besta deild karla	20	1	1	0	0	0	0	0	21	1
Keflavík	2024	Deild karla	18	2	1	0	0	0	0	0	19	2
SR Donaufeld	2024–25	Austrian Regionalliga East	13	3	0	0	0	0	0	0	13	3
SR Donaufeld	2025–26	Austrian Regionalliga East	28	0	1	0	0	0	0	0	29	0
SR Donaufeld	2026–27	Austrian Regionalliga East	12	0	0	0	0	0	0	0	12	0
Career total			211	9	10	2	0	0	1	0	222	11

== Honours ==
Donaufeld

- Austrian Regionalliga: (Regionalliga Ost) 2024–25
