= Mykyta Shevchenko =

Ukrainian footballer

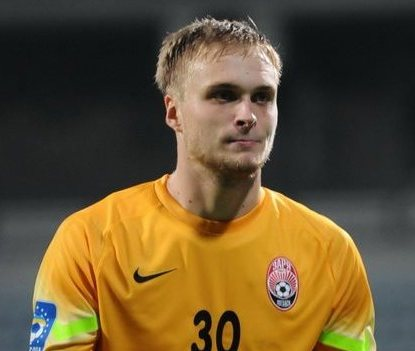

Personal information
- Full name: Mykyta Ruslanovych Shevchenko
- Date of birth: 26 January 1993 (age 33)
- Place of birth: Horlivka, Ukraine
- Height: 1.87 m (6 ft 1 1/2 in)
- Position: Goalkeeper

Youth career
- 2006–2011: Shakhtar Donetsk

Senior career*
Years	Team	Apps	(Gls)
2011–2018	Shakhtar Donetsk	3	(0)
2011–2012	→ Illichivets Mariupol (loan)	0	(0)
2013–2016	→ Zorya Luhansk (loan)	45	(0)
2018	→ Karpaty Lviv (loan)	8	(0)
2019–2022	Zorya Luhansk	40	(0)
2023–2026	Oleksandriya	42	(0)

International career
2008–2009	Ukraine U16	5	(0)
2011	Ukraine U18	1	(0)
2011–2012	Ukraine U19	6	(0)
2014	Ukraine U21	3	(0)
- * Club domestic league appearances and goals as of 24 December 2025

Mykyta Ruslanovych Shevchenko (Ukrainian: Микита Русланович Шевченко, born 26 January 1993) is a Ukrainian professional footballer who plays as a goalkeeper.

== Career ==
Shevchenko has been a member of different Ukrainian national youth football teams. He was called up as a member of the Ukraine national under-18 football team by coach Oleh Kuznetsov in the summer of 2010, but did not play in any games.

Shevchenko was named as part of the senior Ukraine squad for UEFA Euro 2016.

== Career statistics ==
=== Club ===
As of match played 31 July 2025

Appearances and goals by club, season and competition
Club	Season	League			Cup		Europe		Other		Total	
Club	Season	Division	Apps	Goals	Apps	Goals	Apps	Goals	Apps	Goals	Apps	Goals
Shakhtar Donetsk	2012–13	Ukrainian Premier League	0	0	0	0	0	0	0	0	0	0
Shakhtar Donetsk	2016–17	Ukrainian Premier League	2	0	1	0	2	0	0	0	5	0
Shakhtar Donetsk	2017–18	Ukrainian Premier League	1	0	0	0	0	0	0	0	1	0
Shakhtar Donetsk	Total		3	0	1	0	2	0	0	0	6	0
Illichivets Mariupol (loan)	2011–12	Ukrainian Premier League	0	0	0	0	—		—		0	0
Zorya Luhansk (loan)	2013–14	Ukrainian Premier League	8	0	1	0	—		0	0	9	0
Zorya Luhansk (loan)	2014–15	Ukrainian Premier League	16	0	1	0	5	0	—		22	0
Zorya Luhansk (loan)	2015–16	Ukrainian Premier League	21	0	5	0	4	0	—		30	0
Zorya Luhansk (loan)	Total		45	0	7	0	9	0	0	0	61	0
Karpaty Lviv (loan)	2018–19	Ukrainian Premier League	7	0	1	0	—		—		8	0
Zorya Luhansk	2018–19	Ukrainian Premier League	8	0	0	0	—		—		8	0
Zorya Luhansk	2019–20	Ukrainian Premier League	18	0	0	0	5	0	—		23	0
Zorya Luhansk	2020–21	Ukrainian Premier League	9	0	2	0	4	0	—		15	0
Zorya Luhansk	2021–22	Ukrainian Premier League	5	0	0	0	2	0	—		7	0
Zorya Luhansk	Total		40	0	2	0	11	0	—		53	0
Oleksandriya	2022–23	Ukrainian Premier League	16	0	—		—		—		16	0
Oleksandriya	2023–24	Ukrainian Premier League	22	0	1	0	—		—		23	0
Oleksandriya	2024–25	Ukrainian Premier League	0	0	0	0	—		—		0	0
Oleksandriya	2025–26	Ukrainian Premier League	0	0	0	0	2	0	—		2	0
Oleksandriya	Total		38	0	1	0	2	0	—		41	0
Career total			133	0	12	0	24	0	0	0	169	0

== Honours ==
=== Club ===
Shakhtar

- Ukrainian Premier League: 2012–13, 2016–17, 2017–18
- Ukrainian Cup: 2012–13, 2016–17, 2017–18
- Ukrainian Super Cup: 2012, 2017
