= Ihor Duts =

Ukrainian football defender

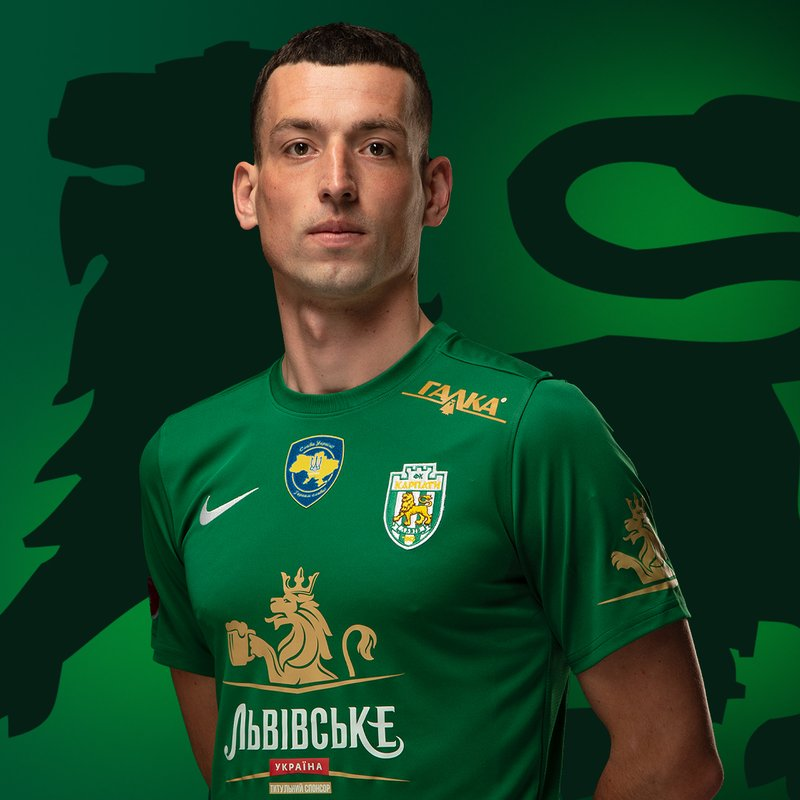

Personal information
- Full name: Ihor Andriyovych Duts
- Date of birth: 11 April 1994 (age 32)
- Place of birth: Nyzhankovychi, Ukraine
- Height: 1.91 m (6 ft 3 in)
- Position: Defender

Team information
- Current team: Rukh Lviv
- Number: 2

Youth career
- 2007–2009: Lviv
- 2009–2011: Shakhtar Donetsk

Senior career*
Years	Team	Apps	(Gls)
2011–2018	Shakhtar Donetsk	0	(0)
2011	→ Shakhtar-3 Donetsk	7	(1)
2015–2017	→ Illichivets Mariupol (loan)	31	(0)
2016–2017	→ Illichivets-2 Mariupol (loan)	6	(0)
2017–2018	→ Rukh Vynnyky (loan)	43	(3)
2019–2020	Rukh Lviv	45	(0)
2021	Okzhetpes	17	(5)
2022	Mynai	0	(0)
2022–2023	Karpaty Lviv	22	(3)
2023–	Rukh Lviv	0	(0)
2023–	Rukh-2 Lviv	22	(2)

International career^{‡}
2010	Ukraine U16	7	(0)
2010–2011	Ukraine U17	19	(0)
2011–2012	Ukraine U18	13	(0)
2012–2013	Ukraine U19	10	(0)
2014–2015	Ukraine U21	18	(0)

Managerial career
- 2023–: Rukh-2 Lviv (assistant)
- * Club domestic league appearances and goals as of 20 June 2024 ‡ National team caps and goals as of 18 December 2018

Ihor Andriyovych Duts (Ukrainian: Ігор Андрійович Дуць; born 11 April 1994) is a Ukrainian professional footballer who plays as a defender for Rukh Lviv.

== Career ==
Duts is a product of the FC Lviv and FC Shakhtar youth sportive schools.

From July 2015 he went on loan for the Ukrainian First League club FC Illichivets Mariupol.
