= Oleksandr Kvachov =

Ukrainian footballer

Personal information
- Full name: Oleksandr Viktorovych Kvachov
- Date of birth: 10 October 1995 (age 31)
- Place of birth: Luhansk, Ukraine
- Position: Defender

Youth career
- Zorya Luhansk

Senior career*
Years	Team	Apps	(Gls)
2013–2015	Zorya Luhansk	0	(0)
2015–2016	Veres Rivne	0	(0)
2015–2017	Enerhiya Nova Kakhovka	37	(2)
2017–2018	Kremin Kremenchuk	25	(1)
2018–2019	Kobra Kharkiv	3	(0)
2018–2019	Sumy	11	(0)
2018–2019	Bukovyna Chernivtsi	9	(2)
2021–2022	Ziemetshausen		
2023	FC Dynamo Toronto		
- * Club domestic league appearances and goals

Oleksandr Kvachov (born October 10, 1995) is a Ukrainian footballer who plays as a defender.

== Club career ==
=== Ukraine ===
Kvachov was a product of the Zorya Luhansk academy and competed with the youth in the Ukrainian Youth Football League. He would ultimately graduate to the senior team and secure a contract for the 2014–15 season. After failing to appear for Luhansk, he left and was picked up by Veres Rivne in the Ukrainian Second League. Though he was signed with Veres, he would finish the campaign with league rivals Enerhiya Nova Kakhovka. In his debut season with Nova, he played in 10 matches. He would return to Nova for the following season and played in 27 matches and recorded 2 goals.

After two seasons in the third division, he would debut in the country's second-tier league for the 2017–18 season by signing with Kremin Kremenchuk. He would leave Kremin after the conclusion of the season to pursue other playing options. Kvachov would remain in the second division the next season by securing a deal with Kobra Kharkiv. The season would become a tumultuous one as he spent the year with three different organizations after Kharkiv experienced financial issues he was transferred to Sumy. Ultimately, he finished the campaign with Bukovyna Chernivtsi in the third division. After the season's conclusion, he left Bukovyna in the summer of 2019.

=== Germany ===
In 2022, he played abroad in the German circuit with TSV Ziemetshausen. Throughout the season, he would assist the club in avoiding relegation.

=== Canada ===
Kvachov would further venture abroad this time to the Canadian Soccer League with FC Dynamo Toronto for the 2023 season. In his debut season in the Canadian circuit, he helped the club finish fourth in the standings.
