= Francisco Di Franco =

Argentine footballer (born 1995)

Personal information
- Date of birth: 28 January 1995 (age 31)
- Place of birth: San Miguel, Argentina
- Height: 1.72 m (5 ft 8 in)
- Position: Striker

Team information
- Current team: Defensores Unidos

Youth career
- 200?–2012: Boca Juniors

Senior career*
Years	Team	Apps	(Gls)
2012–2016	Boca Juniors	2	(0)
2015–2016	→ Tlaxcala (loan)	30	(6)
2016–2018	Apollon Limassol	0	(0)
2016–2017	→ AEZ Zakakiou (loan)	8	(1)
2017–2018	→ Karpaty Lviv (loan)	27	(0)
2018–2019	Karpaty Lviv	44	(4)
2020–2022	Dnipro-1	49	(0)
2022	→ Atlético Tucumán (loan)	15	(0)
2023	Atlético Tucumán	18	(0)
2025–	Defensores Unidos	6	(0)
- * Club domestic league appearances and goals as of 17:08, 30 July 2025 (UTC)

Francisco Di Franco (born 28 January 1995) is an Argentine professional footballer. He is right footed, and plays as a striker for Defensores Unidos.

== Career ==
=== Club career ===
Di Franco made his league debut for Boca Juniors during the 2012/13 season. He played two games that season.
