= Kevin Méndez =

Uruguayan footballer (born 1996)

Personal information
- Full name: Alán Kevin Méndez Olivera
- Date of birth: 10 January 1996 (age 30)
- Place of birth: Trinidad, Uruguay
- Height: 1.75 m (5 ft 9 in)
- Position: Forward

Team information
- Current team: Unión La Calera

Youth career
- 2004–2008: Chacarita de Flores
- 2009–2014: Peñarol

Senior career*
Years	Team	Apps	(Gls)
2013–2014	Peñarol	0	(0)
2015–2018	Roma	0	(0)
2015	→ Perugia (loan)	0	(0)
2016–2017	→ Lausanne-Sport (loan)	21	(4)
2017–2018	→ Viterbese (loan)	25	(1)
2018–2019	Karpaty Lviv	13	(0)
2020–2022	Defensor Sporting	66	(7)
2022–2023	Peñarol	37	(4)
2024	Everton	29	(1)
2025	Chungnam Asan	0	(0)
2025–	Unión La Calera	0	(0)

International career
2011	Uruguay U15	14	(1)
2012–2013	Uruguay U17	36	(9)
2014–2015	Uruguay U20	11	(1)
- * Club domestic league appearances and goals as of 25 July 2025

Alán Kevin Méndez Olivera (born 10 January 1996) is a Uruguayan professional footballer who plays as a forward for Chilean club Unión La Calera.

== Club career ==
Méndez is a former youth academy player of Peñarol. In January 2015, he signed a four-year contract with Roma and was immediately loaned out to Perugia.

On 12 July 2022, Méndez joined Peñarol on a contract until December 2023.

In 2024, Méndez moved to Chile and joined Everton de Viña del Mar.

Following Everton, Méndez moved to South Korea and signed with K League 2 club Chungnam Asan FC.

In the second half of 2025, Méndez returned to Chile and joined Unión La Calera.
