= Dmytro Shevchenko =

Ukrainian footballer

Personal information
- Full name: Dmytro Olehovych Shevchenko
- Date of birth: 15 April 2000 (age 26)
- Place of birth: Kyiv, Ukraine
- Height: 1.74 m (5 ft 9 in)
- Position: Central midfielder

Youth career
- 2010: CSKA Kyiv
- 2013–2014: Atlet Kyiv
- 2014–2017: Piddubny Olympic College

Senior career*
Years	Team	Apps	(Gls)
2017–2019	Arsenal Kyiv	0	(0)
2019	Denhoff Denykhivka	0	(0)
2020–2021	Lyubomyr Stavyshche	10	(0)
2021	VPK-Ahro Shevchenkivka	12	(1)
- * Club domestic league appearances and goals as of 13 February 2022

Dmytro Olehovych Shevchenko (Ukrainian: Дмитро Олегович Шевченко; born 15 April 2000) is a Ukrainian professional footballer who plays as a central midfielder.
