= Vasyl Lytvynenko =

Ukrainian footballer

Personal information
- Full name: Vasyl Vasylyovych Lytvynenko
- Date of birth: 3 October 1991 (age 35)
- Place of birth: Pohreby, Kyiv Oblast, Ukraine
- Height: 1.92 m (6 ft 4 in)
- Position: Goalkeeper

Youth career
- 2006–2007: Obolon Kyiv
- 2008: Zmina-Obolon Kyiv

Senior career*
Years	Team	Apps	(Gls)
2009	KNTEU Kyiv	1	(0)
2010–2013	Obolon Kyiv	0	(0)
2012	→ Dynamo Khmelnytskyi (loan)	2	(0)
2012–2013	→ Obolon-2 Bucha	3	(0)
2013–2019	Kolos Kovalivka	46	(0)
2019–2022	Obolon Kyiv	42	(0)
2020–2021	→ Obolon-2 Bucha	1	(0)
2022–2023	Widzew Łódź	0	(0)
- * Club domestic league appearances and goals as of 16 July 2022

Vasyl Vasylyovych Lytvynenko (Ukrainian: Василь Васильович Литвиненко; born 3 October 1991) is a Ukrainian professional footballer who plays as a goalkeeper.
