= Vadym Petrov =

Ukrainian footballer

Personal information
- Full name: Vadym Serhiyovych Petrov
- Date of birth: 29 September 1995 (age 31)
- Place of birth: Zaporizhzhia, Ukraine
- Height: 1.71 m (5 ft 7 1/2 in)
- Position: Forward

Youth career
- 2008–2012: Metalurh Zaporizhya

Senior career*
| Years | Team | Apps | (Gls) |
| 2012–2013 | Metalurh Zaporizhzhia | 0 | (0) |
| 2013–2016 | Dynamo Kyiv | 0 | (0) |
| 2014 | → Hoverla Uzhhorod (loan) | 0 | (0) |
| 2015 | → Dynamo-2 Kyiv | 7 | (0) |
| 2016 | Metalurh Zaporizhzhia | 16 | (5) |
| 2017–2018 | Mikkelin Palloilijat | 12 | (1) |
| 2018 | Mykolaiv | 1 | (0) |
| 2018 | → Mykolaiv-2 | 5 | (1) |
| 2019 | Metalurh Zaporizhzhia | 25 | (1) |
| 2020 | Peremoha Dnipro | 9 | (0) |
- * Club domestic league appearances and goals as of 31 December 2020

Vadym Petrov (Ukrainian: Вадим Сергійович Петров; born 29 September 1995) is a professional Ukrainian football striker.

== Career ==
Petrov is a product of FC Metalurh Zaporizhya Youth Sportive School.

After playing for Ukrainian clubs in the different levels, in March 2017 he signed a contract with a Finnish club Mikkelin Palloilijat from the Ykkönen.
