= Roman Slyva =

Ukrainian footballer (born 2000)

Personal information
- Full name: Roman Serhiyovych Slyva
- Date of birth: 23 September 2000 (age 26)
- Place of birth: Rivne, Ukraine
- Height: 1.77 m (5 ft 10 in)
- Position: Defender

Team information
- Current team: Ahrobiznes Volochysk
- Number: 17

Youth career
- 201?–2019: Karpaty Lviv

Senior career*
Years	Team	Apps	(Gls)
2019–2021	Karpaty Lviv	20	(0)
2021–2022	VPK-Ahro Shevchenkivka	6	(0)
2022–2024	Nyva Ternopil	18	(0)
2024–	Ahrobiznes Volochysk	49	(0)

International career^{‡}
2017	Ukraine U17	2	(0)
2017	Ukraine U18	1	(0)
2018–2019	Ukraine U19	7	(0)
- * Club domestic league appearances and goals as of 3 June 2026 ‡ National team caps and goals as of 9 December 2020

Roman Serhiyovych Slyva (Ukrainian: Роман Сергійович Слива; born 23 September 2000) is a Ukrainian professional football defender for Ahrobiznes Volochysk.

== Career ==
Slyva is a product of the FC Karpaty Lviv Sport School.

He made his debut for FC Karpaty as the substituted player in the winning away match against FC Vorskla Poltava on 24 February 2019 in the Ukrainian Premier League.
