= Martin Hongla =

Cameroonian footballer

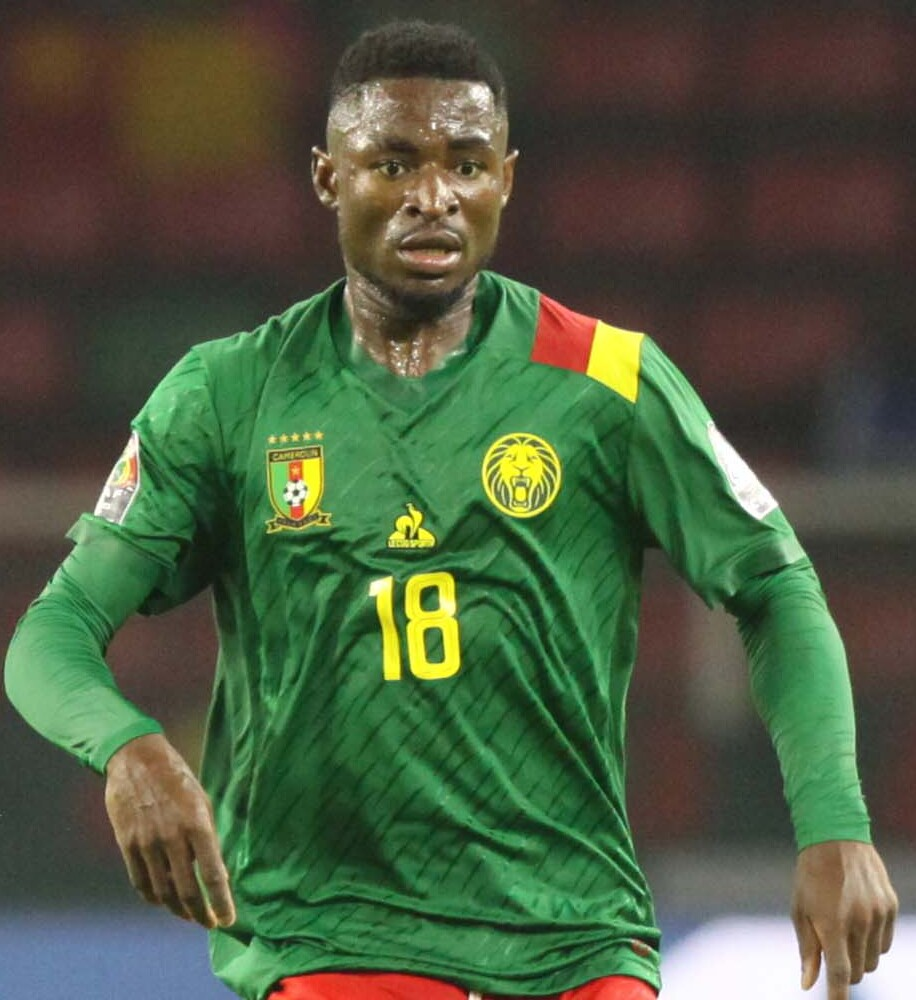
- Hongla playing for Cameroon at the 2021 Africa Cup of Nations

Personal information
- Full name: Martin Hongla Yma II
- Date of birth: 16 March 1998 (age 28)
- Place of birth: Yaoundé, Cameroon
- Height: 1.82 m (6 ft 0 in)
- Positions: Defensive midfielder; centre-back

Team information
- Current team: Aris
- Number: 18

Youth career
- –2016: Nkufo Academy

Senior career*
Years	Team	Apps	(Gls)
2016–2018	Granada B	35	(1)
2017–2019	Granada	10	(0)
2018	→ Barcelona B (loan)	6	(0)
2019	→ Karpaty Lviv (loan)	13	(2)
2019–2022	Royal Antwerp	37	(3)
2021–2022	→ Hellas Verona (loan)	18	(1)
2022–2024	Hellas Verona	24	(0)
2023	→ Valladolid (loan)	16	(0)
2024–2026	Granada	50	(4)
2026	→ Aris (loan)	13	(2)
2026–	Aris	4	(0)

International career^{‡}
2015	Cameroon U17	3	(1)
2017	Cameroon U20	3	(2)
2019	Cameroon U23	2	(0)
2020–	Cameroon	35	(1)
Medal record
Men's football
Representing Cameroon
Africa Cup of Nations
Third place	2021 Cameroon
- * Club domestic league appearances and goals as of 19 September 2026 ‡ National team caps and goals as of 13 November 2025

Martin Hongla Yma II (born 16 March 1998) is a Cameroonian professional footballer who plays as a defensive midfielder or centre-back for Super League Greece club Aris and the Cameroon national team.

== Club career ==
Born in Yaoundé, Hongla joined Granada CF in 2016, from Blaise Nkufo's Nkufo Sports Academy. He was initially assigned to the reserves in Segunda División B.

Hongla made his senior debut on 21 August 2016, starting in a 1–1 home draw against Atlético Mancha Real. He made his first team – and La Liga – debut on 28 January 2017, playing the full 90 minutes in a 2–0 defeat at Villarreal CF.

Ahead of the 2017–18 season, Hongla was definitely promoted to the main squad, now in Segunda División. On 16 January 2018, he was loaned to fellow league team FC Barcelona B, for six months.

On 3 July 2019, after a six-month loan to FC Karpaty Lviv, Hongla joined Royal Antwerp FC in the Belgian First Division A. On 9 July 2021, he joined Italian Serie A club Hellas Verona on loan with a conditional purchase obligation.

On 31 January 2023, Hongla returned to Spain and its top tier, after agreeing to a six-month loan deal with Real Valladolid.

On 12 January 2024, Hongla returned to Granada. He reportedly signed a three-and-a-half-year contract for a transfer fee of €2.5 million.

On 13 January 2026, Hongla was loaned to Super League Greece club Aris with an obligatory buyout clause.

== International career ==
Hongla played at the 2015 African U-17 Championship, 2017 Africa U-20 Cup of Nations qualification and the 2019 Africa U-23 Cup of Nations.

He made his debut for Cameroon national team on 16 November 2020 in a Cup of Nations qualifier game against Mozambique, as a starter.

On November 10, 2022, he was selected by Rigobert Song to compete in the 2022 FIFA World Cup.

== Career statistics ==
=== Club ===
As of match played 28 September 2025

Appearances and goals by club, season and competition
Club	Season	League			Cup		Europe		Other		Total	
Club	Season	Division	Apps	Goals	Apps	Goals	Apps	Goals	Apps	Goals	Apps	Goals
Granada B	2016–17	Segunda División B	23	0	—		—		—		23	0
Granada B	2017–18	Segunda División B	12	1	—		—		—		12	1
Granada B	Total		35	1	—		—		—		35	1
Granada	2016–17	La Liga	10	0	0	0	—		—		10	0
Barcelona B (loan)	2017–18	Segunda División	6	0	—		—		—		6	0
Karpaty Lviv (loan)	2018–19	Ukrainian Premier League	13	2	2	0	—		2 (Note: Appearances in Relegation play-offs)	0	17	1
Royal Antwerp	2019–20	Belgian First Division A	9	0	4	0	2 (Note: Appearances in UEFA Europa League)	0	—		15	0
Royal Antwerp	2020–21	Belgian First Division A	28	3	1	0	8	0	6 (Note: Appearances in Belgian Pro League play-offs)	0	43	3
Royal Antwerp	Total		37	3	5	0	10	0	6	0	58	3
Hellas Verona (loan)	2021–22	Serie A	18	1	2	0	—		—		20	1
Hellas Verona	2022–23	Serie A	9	0	1	0	—		—		10	0
Hellas Verona	2023–24	Serie A	15	0	2	0	—		—		17	0
Hellas Verona	Total		42	1	5	0	—		—		47	0
Real Valladolid (loan)	2022–23	La Liga	16	0	—		—		—		16	0
Granada	2023–24	Segunda División	13	0	0	0	—		—		13	0
Granada	2024–25	Segunda División	33	3	1	0	—		—		34	3
Granada	2025–26	Segunda División	4	1	0	0	—		—		4	1
Granada	Total		50	4	1	0	—		—		51	4
Career total			209	11	13	0	10	0	8	0	240	11

=== International ===
As of match played 13 November 2025

Appearances and goals by national team and year
National team	Year	Apps	Goals
Cameroon
Cameroon	2020	1	0
Cameroon	2021	10	0
Cameroon	2022	10	0
Cameroon	2023	1	0
Cameroon	2024	8	1
Cameroon	2025	5	0
Total		35	1

== Honours ==
Antwerp

- Belgian Cup: 2019–20

Cameroon

- Africa Cup of Nations third place: 2021
