= Andriy Busko =

Ukrainian footballer

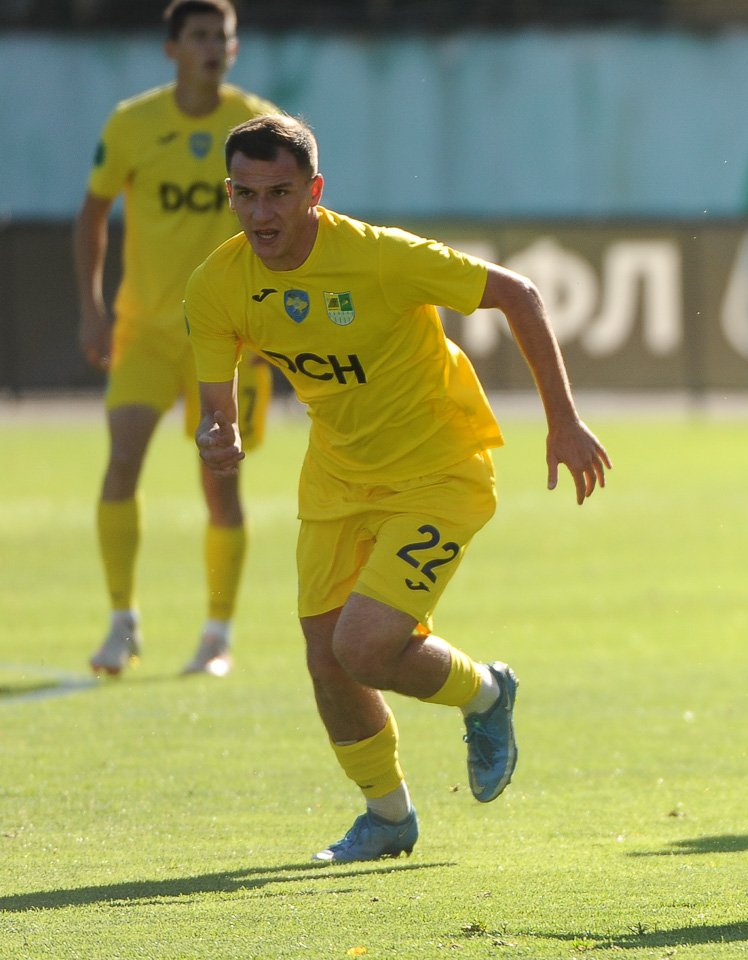

Personal information
- Full name: Andriy Vasylyovych Busko
- Date of birth: 20 May 1997 (age 29)
- Place of birth: Cherneve, Lviv Oblast, Ukraine
- Height: 1.78 m (5 ft 10 in)
- Position: Midfielder

Team information
- Current team: Bukovyna Chernivtsi
- Number: 24

Youth career
- 2010–2014: Karpaty Lviv

Senior career*
Years	Team	Apps	(Gls)
2014–2019	Karpaty Lviv	10	(0)
2018	→ Rukh Vynnyky (loan)	12	(1)
2020–2023	Lviv	31	(0)
2023–2024	Metalist Kharkiv	24	(1)
2024–	Bukovyna Chernivtsi	37	(0)
- * Club domestic league appearances and goals as of 3 June 2026

Andriy Busko (Ukrainian: Андрій Васильович Бусько; born 20 May 1997) is a Ukrainian professional footballer who plays as defender for Bukovyna Chernivtsi in the Ukrainian First League.

== Career ==
Born in Cherneve, Mostyska Raion, Busko is a product of the FC Karpaty Lviv academy system. He made his debut for FC Karpaty as a substitute against FC Dynamo Kyiv on 29 July 2017 in the Ukrainian Premier League.
