= Oleh Boroday =

Ukrainian footballer (born 1993)

Personal information
- Full name: Oleh Vadymovych Boroday
- Date of birth: 7 January 1993 (age 33)
- Place of birth: Melitopol, Ukraine
- Height: 1.84 m (6 ft 0 in)
- Position: Centre-back

Team information
- Current team: Viktoriya Sumy (assistant)

Youth career
- 2006–2008: Melitopol
- 2009: Azovstal Mariupol

Senior career*
Years	Team	Apps	(Gls)
2010	Olkom Melitopol	2	(0)
2011–2015	Zorya Luhansk	0	(0)
2016	Sumy	14	(0)
2017–2018	Poltava	19	(1)
2018	Karpaty Lviv	12	(0)
2019	Górnik Łęczna	10	(0)
2019	Avanhard Kramatorsk	11	(2)
2020	Obolon-Brovar Kyiv	0	(0)
2020	Kremin Kremenchuk	10	(1)
2021	Avanhard Kramatorsk	15	(3)
2021–2023	Obolon Kyiv	22	(0)
2022	→ Broń Radom (loan)	10	(0)
- * Club domestic league appearances and goals

Oleh Vadymovych Boroday (Ukrainian: Олег Вадимович Бородай; born 7 January 1993) is a Ukrainian former professional footballer who played as a centre-back. He is currently the assistant coach of Ukrainian First League club Viktoriya Sumy.

He made his debut for Olkom Melitopol in the Ukrainian Second League in 2010. He then signed a contract with FC Zorya and made his debut in this team as a substitute in second half in a match against KF Laçi in 2014–15 UEFA Europa League on 17 July 2014.
