= Rodrigo Vargas (footballer, born 1994) =

Bolivian footballer

Personal information
- Full name: Rodrigo Mauricio Vargas Castillo
- Date of birth: 19 October 1994 (age 32)
- Place of birth: Santa Cruz de la Sierra, Bolivia
- Height: 1.69 m (5 ft 7 in)
- Position: Forward

Team information
- Current team: San Antonio Bulo Bulo
- Number: 18

Youth career
- –2011: Oriente Petrolero

Senior career*
Years	Team	Apps	(Gls)
2011–2016	Oriente Petrolero	111	(20)
2016–2017	Nacional Potosí	10	(0)
2017	Club Petrolero	37	(16)
2018	The Strongest	0	(0)
2018–2019	Karpaty Lviv	16	(0)
2019–2020	Royal Pari	32	(3)
2021–2023	Wilstermann	32	(6)
2024	GV San José	23	(6)
2025–	San Antonio Bulo Bulo	8	(3)

International career^{‡}
2011	Bolivia U20	4	(0)
2013	Bolivia U20	4	(2)
2013–	Bolivia	6	(0)
- * Club domestic league appearances and goals as of 30 December 2025 ‡ National team caps and goals as of 7 June 2018

Rodrigo Vargas is a Bolivian footballer who plays as a forward for San Antonio Bulo Bulo.
