= Roman Tolochko =

Ukrainian footballer

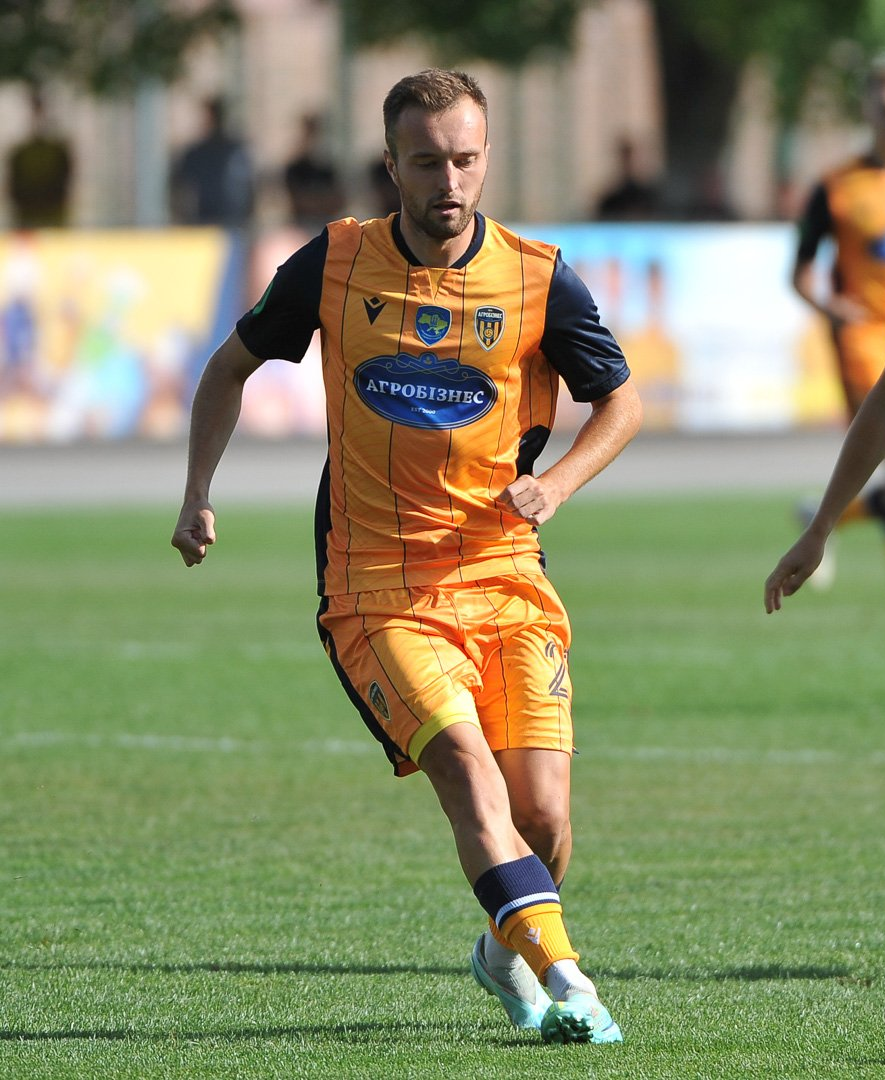

Personal information
- Full name: Roman Romanovych Tolochko
- Date of birth: 25 October 1998 (age 28)
- Place of birth: Lviv, Ukraine
- Height: 1.76 m (5 ft 9 in)
- Position: Midfielder

Team information
- Current team: FC Oleksandriya
- Number: 21

Youth career
- 2010–2018: Karpaty Lviv

Senior career*
Years	Team	Apps	(Gls)
2018–2020	Karpaty Lviv	8	(0)
2020	→ Kalush (loan)	0	(0)
2020	Metalist 1925 Kharkiv	2	(0)
2021	Avanhard Kramatorsk	16	(4)
2021	Prykarpattia Ivano-Frankivsk	10	(0)
2022	LNZ Cherkasy	1	(0)
2023–26	Ahrobiznes Volochysk	86	(14)
2026-	FC Oleksandria	13	(1)

International career
2019	Ukraine (students)		
- * Club domestic league appearances and goals as of 25/10/26 @ 06:33(AEST)

Roman Romanovych Tolochko (Ukrainian: Роман Романович Толочко; born 25 October 1998) is a Ukrainian professional footballer who plays as a midfielder for Ahrobiznes Volochysk.

== Career ==
Tolochko is a product of the Karpaty Lviv School Sportive System.

He made his senior debut for FC Karpaty against FC Lviv on 3 March 2019 in the Ukrainian Premier League.

== Personal life ==
His father, Roman Tolochko, is a retired football player.
