= 2019–20 FC Lviv season =

FC Lviv
2019–20 season
- President: Bohdan Kopytko
- Manager: Bohdan Blavatskyi (until 10 September 2019); Volodymyr Mazyar (since 10 September 2019 until 31 October 2019; Yegishe Melikyan (since 31 October 2019 until 31 June 2020; Giorgi Tsetsadze (since 22 June 2020)
- Stadium: Ukraina Stadium
- Ukrainian Premier League: 11th
- Ukrainian Cup: Round of 16 (1/8)
- Top goalscorer: League: Renan de Oliveira (6); All: Renan de Oliveira (8)
- Highest home attendance: 7,103 (vs Dynamo Kyiv, 3 August 2019)
- Lowest home attendance: 0 (all home matches were played behind closed doors starting 14 March 2020)
- Average home league attendance: 1,558
| Home colours | Away colours | Third colours |

The 2019–20 season was 3rd season in the top Ukrainian football league for FC Lviv. Lviv competed in Premier League and Ukrainian Cup.

== Players ==
=== Squad information ===
As of 19 July 2020

| Squad no. | Name | Nationality | Position | Date of birth (age) |
Goalkeepers
| 23 | Bohdan Sarnavskyi | (Ukraine) | GK | 29 January 1995 (aged 25) |
| 94 | Herman Penkov | (Ukraine) | GK | 26 May 1994 (aged 26) |
Defenders
| 5 | Vladyslav Pryimak | (Ukraine) | DF | 30 August 1996 (aged 23) |
| 8 | Maksym Komarets ^{List B} | (Ukraine) | DF | 23 May 2002 (aged 18) |
| 9 | Mykyta Tatarkov | (Ukraine) | DF | 4 January 1995 (aged 25) |
| 21 | Ihor Honchar | (Ukraine) | DF | 10 January 1993 (aged 27) |
| 22 | Anton Bratkov | (Ukraine) | DF | 14 May 1993 (aged 27) |
| 27 | Andriy Busko | (Ukraine) | DF | 20 May 1997 (aged 23) |
| 33 | Serhiy Borzenko | (Ukraine) | DF | 22 June 1986 (aged 34) |
| 35 | Yuriy Kravchuk (on loan from Hirnyk-Sport Horishni Plavni) | (Ukraine) | DF | 6 April 1994 (aged 26) |
| 44 | Cleber ^{List B} | (Brazil) | DF | 15 March 1999 (aged 21) |
| 90 | Serhiy Lyulka | (Ukraine) | DF | 22 February 1990 (aged 30) |
| 95 | Joël Bopesu | (France) (Democratic Republic of the Congo) | DF | 25 January 1995 (aged 25) |
| | Maksym Brama ^{List B} | (Ukraine) | DF | 1 February 2002 (aged 18) |
Midfielders
| 7 | China | (Brazil) | MF | 2 August 1996 (aged 23) |
| 10 | Alvaro | (Brazil) | MF | 10 March 1995 (aged 25) |
| 17 | Mykyta Khodakovskyi | (Ukraine) | MF | 18 October 1996 (aged 23) |
| 18 | Baiano ^{List B} | (Brazil) | MF | 24 November 2000 (aged 19) |
| 20 | Yehor Klymenchuk | (Ukraine) | MF | 11 November 1997 (aged 22) |
| 25 | Artem Nedolya | (Ukraine) | MF | 20 October 1993 (aged 26) |
| 26 | Maksym Khimchak ^{List B} | (Ukraine) | MF | 13 February 2000 (aged 20) |
| 30 | Jonatan Lima | (Brazil) | MF | 4 January 1998 (aged 22) |
| 43 | Andriy Vychizhanin ^{List B} | (Ukraine) | MF | 18 August 1999 (aged 20) |
| 55 | Dmytro Penteleychuk ^{List B} | (Ukraine) | MF | 9 August 2000 (aged 19) |
| 93 | Yaroslav Bohunov | (Ukraine) | MF | 4 September 1993 (aged 26) |
| 96 | Rafael Sabino | (Brazil) | MF | 17 June 1996 (aged 24) |
| | Araujo | (Brazil) | MF | 7 August 1998 (aged 21) |
Forwards
| 13 | Nazariy Nych ^{List B} | (Ukraine) | FW | 19 February 1999 (aged 21) |
| 14 | Matheus Iacovelli | (Brazil) | FW | 13 March 1998 (aged 22) |
| 19 | Renan | (Brazil) | FW | 8 May 1997 (aged 23) |
| 77 | Filipe Pachtmann ^{List B} | (Brazil) | FW | 11 April 2000 (aged 20) |

== Transfers ==
=== In ===
| Date | Pos. | Player | Age | Moving from | Type | Fee | Source |
Summer
| 11 July 2019 | FW | (Brazil) Renan | 22 | (Malta) San Ġwann | Transfer | Undisclosed | |
| 13 July 2019 | DF | (Ukraine) Mykola Kvasnyi | 24 | (Ukraine) Prykarpattia Ivano-Frankivsk | Transfer | Free | |
| 13 July 2019 | MF | (Ukraine) Yaroslav Bohunov | 25 | (Belarus) NFK Minsk | Transfer | Undisclosed | |
| 14 July 2019 | DF | (Ukraine) Anton Bratkov | 26 | (Israel) Maccabi Petah Tikva | Transfer | Undisclosed | |
| 14 July 2019 | DF | (Ukraine) Ruslan Zubkov | 27 | Unattached | Transfer | Free | |
| 23 July 2019 | MF | (Brazil) Baiano | 18 | (Slovakia) Lokomotíva Košice | Transfer | Undisclosed | |
| 23 July 2019 | MF | (Brazil) Leonardo Montezello | 18 | (Slovakia) Lokomotíva Košice | Transfer | Undisclosed | |
| 14 August 2019 | DF | (Ukraine) Ihor Honchar | 26 | (Ukraine) Vorskla Poltava | Transfer | Free | |
| 24 August 2019 | DF | (Brazil) Cleber | 20 | | Transfer | Undisclosed | |
| 24 August 2019 | FW | (Brazil) Filipe Pachtmann | 19 | | Transfer | Undisclosed | |
| 12 September 2019 | DF | (Ukraine) Serhiy Lyulka | 29 | (Ukraine) Desna Chernihiv | Transfer | Free | |
| 31 October 2019 | DF | (Ukraine) Mykyta Tatarkov | 24 | (Belarus) Shakhtyor Soligorsk | Transfer | Free | |
| 1 June 2019 | MF | (Brazil) Araujo | 20 | (Slovakia) Lokomotíva Košice | Loan return | | |
Winter
| 23 January 2020 | GK | (Ukraine) Herman Penkov | 24 | (Ukraine) Olimpik Donetsk | Transfer | Free | |
| 26 January 2020 | DF | (France) Joël Bopesu | 25 | (Latvia) Riga | Transfer | Undisclosed | |
| 28 January 2020 | MF | (Ukraine) Andriy Busko | 22 | (Ukraine) Karpaty Lviv | Transfer | Undisclosed | |
| 4 February 2020 | DF | (Ukraine) Yehor Klymenchuk | 22 | (Ukraine) Olimpik Donetsk | Transfer | Free | |
| 4 February 2020 | MF | (Ukraine) Mykyta Khodakovskyi | 23 | (Ukraine) Bukovyna Chernivtsi | Transfer | Undisclosed | |
| 20 February 2020 | MF | (Brazil) Jonatan Lima | 28 | Unattached | Transfer | Free | |
| 20 February 2020 | MF | (Ukraine) Artem Nedolya | 26 | (Ukraine) FC Lviv | Transfer | Free | |
| 20 February 2020 | FW | (Brazil) Matheus Iacovelli | 21 | (Portugal) Estoril | Transfer | Free | |
| 13 July 2020 | MF | (Brazil) Araujo | 21 | (Ukraine) FC Mynai | Loan return | | |
| 6 February 2020 | MF | (Ukraine) Yuriy Kravchuk | 25 | (Ukraine) Hirnyk-Sport Horishni Plavni | Loan | | |

=== Out ===
| Date | Pos. | Player | Age | Moving to | Type | Fee | Source |
Summer
| 1 June 2019 | MF | (Brazil) Jonatan Lima | 27 | Unattached | Transfer | Free | |
| 1 June 2019 | MF | (Brazil) Lipe Veloso | 22 | Unattached | Transfer | Free | |
| 11 July 2019 | DF | (Ukraine) Vadym Paramonov | 28 | (Ukraine) Kolos Kovalivka | Transfer | Free | |
| 11 July 2019 | MF | (Ukraine) Oleh Horin | 19 | (Poland) Jagiellonia Białystok | Transfer | Undisclsed | |
| 20 July 2019 | MF | (Ukraine) Vitaliy Mykytyn | 20 | (Ukraine) Veres Rivne | Transfer | Undisclosed | |
| 20 July 2019 | FW | (Ukraine) Yuriy Ivanochko | 21 | (Ukraine) Veres Rivne | Transfer | Undisclosed | |
| 23 July 2019 | MF | (Brazil) Cadina | 22 | (Greece) Ergotelis | Transfer | Free | |
| 15 August 2019 | FW | (Brazil) Bruno Duarte | 23 | (Portugal) Vitória Guimarães | Transfer | €0.6M | |
| 30 October 2019 | DF | (Ukraine) Oleksandr Nasonov | 27 | Unattached | Transfer | Free | |
| 23 June 2019 | FW | (Brazil) Kauê | 22 | (Brazil) Palmeiras | Loan return | | |
| 9 August 2019 | MF | (Brazil) Araujo | 20 | (Ukraine) FC Mynai | Loan | | |
Winter
| 31 December 2019 | MF | (Brazil) Leonardo Montezello | 18 | Unattached | Transfer | Free | |
| 1 January 2020 | DF | (Ukraine) Volodymyr Adamyuk | 28 | (Ukraine) SC Dnipro-1 | Transfer | Unattached | |
| 1 January 2020 | DF | (Ukraine) Mykola Kvasnyi | 24 | (Ukraine) Inhulets Petrove | Transfer | Free | |
| 16 January 2020 | MF | (Brazil) Marthã | 22 | (Brazil) Ceará | Transfer | Unattached | |
| 25 January 2020 | DF | (Brazil) Vicente | 23 | (Albania) KF Bylis | Transfer | Free | |
| 30 January 2020 | GK | (Ukraine) Oleksandr Bandura | 33 | (Ukraine) Rukh Lviv | Transfer | Free | |
| 7 February 2020 | DF | (Ukraine) Ruslan Zubkov | 28 | (Ukraine) Veres Rivne | Transfer | Free | |
| 31 May 2020 | MF | (Ukraine) Stanyslav Demkiv | 20 | Unattached | Transfer | Free | |
| 17 February 2020 | MF | (Brazil) Pedro Vitor | 21 | (Finland) Kuopion Palloseura | Loan | | |
| 20 February 2020 | FW | (Brazil) Pernambuco | 21 | (Georgia (country)) Dinamo Tbilisi | Loan | | |

== Pre-season and friendlies ==
| 28 June 2019 Friendly | Nyva Vinnytsia (Ukraine) | 0–0 | (Ukraine) FC Lviv |
| EEST (UTC+03:00) | | Report |

| 2 July 2019 Friendly | FC Lviv (Ukraine) | 3–3 | (Ukraine) Ahrobiznes Volochysk |
| EEST (UTC+03:00) | China 13'; 61' (pen.); Borzenko 13' | Report | Goal |

| 14 July 2019 Friendly | FC Lviv (Ukraine) | 0–2 | (Ukraine) Prykarpattia Ivano-Frankivsk | Lviv |
| 16:00 EEST (UTC+03:00) | | Report | Barchuk 26' (pen.); Boryshkevych 84' | Stadium: Sokil Stadium |

| 19 July 2019 Friendly | Volyn Lutsk (Ukraine) | 1–2 | (Ukraine) FC Lviv | Lutsk |
| 18:00 EEST (UTC+03:00) | Ponomar 24' | Report | Renan 29', 38' | Stadium: Avanhard Stadium |

| 25 July 2019 Friendly | FC Lviv (Ukraine) | 2–0 | (Israel) Bnei Yehuda | Siedlce, Poland |
| 16:00 EEST (UTC+03:00) | Renan 6'; Pernambuco 41' | Report |

| 23 January 2020 Friendly | FC Lviv (Ukraine) | 1–2 | (Ukraine) FC Mynai | Lviv |
| 15:00 EET (UTC+02:00) | Bohunov 24' | Report | Mayik 53'; Mykulyak 89' | Stadium: Olympic Reserve School №4 Stadium |

| 3 February 2020 Friendly | FC Lviv (Ukraine) | Cancelled | (Bulgaria) Levski Sofia | Turkey |
| EET (UTC+02:00) | | Report |

| 3 February 2020 Friendly | FC Lviv (Ukraine) | 0–0 | (Serbia) Vojvodina | Turkey |
| EET (UTC+02:00) | | Report |

| 5 February 2020 Friendly | FC Lviv (Ukraine) | 0–2 | (Serbia) Grafičar Beograd | Turkey |
| EET (UTC+02:00) | | Report |

| 7 February 2020 Friendly | FC Lviv (Ukraine) | 3–0 | (Latvia) Spartaks Jūrmala | Turkey |
| 10:00 EET (UTC+02:00) | Renan; Bohunov | Report |

| 7 February 2020 Friendly | FC Lviv (Ukraine) | 2–1 | (Latvia) Valmieras FK | Turkey |
| 16:00 EET (UTC+02:00) | Khodakovskyi | Report | Goal |

| 9 February 2020 Friendly | FC Lviv (Ukraine) | 2–0 | (Slovenia) NŠ Mura | Turkey |
| 14:00 EET (UTC+02:00) | Alvaro 25' (pen.); Rafael Sabino 30' | Report |

| 10 February 2020 Friendly | FC Lviv (Ukraine) | 1–1 | (Ukraine) FC Mariupol | Side, Turkey |
| 10:00 EET (UTC+02:00) | Renan 44' | Report | Churko 60' (pen.) | Stadium: Starlight |

| 11 February 2020 Friendly | FC Lviv (Ukraine) | 1–1 | (Armenia) Lori FC | Turkey |
| 14:00 EET (UTC+02:00) | Baiano 25' (pen.) | Report | Goal |

| 22 May 2020 Friendly | FC Mynai (Ukraine) | 2–3 | (Ukraine) FC Lviv | Mynai |
| 15:00 EEST (UTC+03:00) | | | | Stadium: Mynai Arena; Referee: Yaroslav Kozyk |

== Competitions ==
=== Overall ===
| Competition | First match | Last match | Starting round | Final position | Record | | | | | | | |
| Competition | First match | Last match | Starting round | Final position | Pld | W | D | L | GF | GA | GD | Win % |
|---|---|---|---|---|---|---|---|---|---|---|---|---|
| Premier League | 30 July 2019 | 19 July 2020 | Matchday 1 | 11th | 32 | 5 | 9 | 18 | 25 | 57 | −32 | 15.63 |
| Cup | 25 September 2019 | 30 October 2019 | Third Preliminary round (1/16) | Round of 16 (1/8) | 2 | 1 | 0 | 1 | 2 | 2 | +0 | 50.00 |
| Total | | | | | 34 | 6 | 9 | 19 | 27 | 59 | −32 | 17.65 |

Last updated: 19 July 2020
Source: Competitions

=== Premier League ===
==== League table ====
| Pos | Team | Pld | W | D | L | GF | GA | GD | Pts | Qualification or relegation |
|---|---|---|---|---|---|---|---|---|---|---|
| 8 | FC Mariupol | 32 | 12 | 9 | 11 | 40 | 46 | −6 | 45 | Qualification for the playoff for Europa League second qualifying round |
| 9 | Olimpik Donetsk | 32 | 10 | 6 | 16 | 32 | 47 | −15 | 36 | |
| 10 | Vorskla Poltava | 32 | 9 | 7 | 16 | 23 | 48 | −25 | 34 | |
| 11 | FC Lviv | 32 | 5 | 9 | 18 | 25 | 57 | −32 | 24 | |
| 12 | Karpaty Lviv (Note: Karpaty Lviv was expelled from the league for failing to appear to two games.) | 32 | 2 | 9 | 21 | 19 | 48 | −29 | 15 | Expelled from the league |

Source: Ukrainian Premier League, UEFA, Soccerway
Rules for classification: 1) Points; 2) Head-to-head points; 3) Head-to-head goal difference; 4) Head-to-head higher number of goals scored; 5) Goal difference; 6) Higher number of goals scored; 7) Draw or "golden match" if tied for title (Article 22, paragraph 3).

==== Results summary ====
| Overall | | | | | | | | Home | | | | | | Away | | | | | |
| Pld | W | D | L | GF | GA | GD | Pts | W | D | L | GF | GA | GD | W | D | L | GF | GA | GD |
|---|---|---|---|---|---|---|---|---|---|---|---|---|---|---|---|---|---|---|---|
| 32 | 5 | 9 | 18 | 25 | 57 | −32 | 24 | 2 | 5 | 9 | 12 | 28 | −16 | 3 | 4 | 9 | 13 | 29 | −16 |

Last updated: 19 July 2020.
Source: Competitive matches

==== Results by round ====
| Round | 1 | 2 | 3 | 4 | 5 | 6 | 7 | 8 | 9 | 10 | 11 | 12 | 13 | 14 | 15 | 16 | 17 | 18 | 19 | 20 | 21 | 22 | 23 | 24 | 25 | 26 | 27 | 28 | 29 | 30 | 31 | 32 |
|---|---|---|---|---|---|---|---|---|---|---|---|---|---|---|---|---|---|---|---|---|---|---|---|---|---|---|---|---|---|---|---|---|
| Ground | A | H | A | H | A | H | A | H | A | H | A | H | A | H | A | H | A | H | A | H | A | H | H | A | H | A | A | A | H | A | H | H |
| Result | W | L | L | L | W | L | L | L | L | D | D | L | L | W | L | L | D | W | W | D | L | D | D | D | L | L | L | D | D | L | L | L |
| Position | 5 | 6 | 10 | 11 | 7 | 10 | 11 | 11 | 11 | 11 | 12 | 12 | 12 | 11 | 11 | 10 | 10 | 10 | 10 | 9 | 9 | 9 | 9 | 9 | 9 | 11 | 11 | 11 | 11 | 11 | 11 | 11 |

Updated to match(es) played on 19 July 2020. Source: Competitive matches
A = Away; H = Home; W = Win; D = Draw; L = Loss

==== Matches ====
| 30 July 2019 1 | Desna Chernihiv | 1–2 | FC Lviv | Chernihiv |
| 19:00 EEST (UTC+03:00) | Denys Favorov 30'; Filippov (yellow card) 42'; Hitchenko (yellow card) 88' | Report | Kvasnyi (yellow card) 8'; Pryimak (yellow card) 25'; Pernambuco 53'; Alvaro 85', (yellow card) 85'; Adamyuk (yellow card) 90'; Marthã (yellow card) 90+1' | Stadium: Chernihiv Stadium; Attendance: 4,037; Referee: Denys Shurman |

| 3 August 2019 2 | FC Lviv | 0–3 | Dynamo Kyiv | Lviv |
| 19:30 EEST (UTC+03:00) | Bruno Duarte (yellow card) 21'; Rafael Sabino (yellow card) 81'; Alvaro (yellow card) 90'; China (yellow card) 90+2' | Report | Buyalskyi 45+1', 45+3' (pen.) de Pena 52', (yellow card) 59'; Besyedin (yellow card) 59' | Stadium: Arena Lviv; Attendance: 7,103; Referee: Ihor Paskhal |

| 10 August 2019 3 | Vorskla Poltava | 3–2 | FC Lviv | Poltava |
| 19:30 EEST (UTC+03:00) | Šehić 2', 27'; Luizão (yellow card) 14'; Kolomoyets (yellow card) 28'; Perduta (yellow card) 44'; Sklyar (yellow card) 82'; Kane (yellow card) 90'; Vasin (yellow card) 90+3', (goal) 90+5' (pen.) | Report | Bruno Duarte 20'; Kvasnyi (yellow card) 49'; China 58', (yellow card) 59'; Borzenko (yellow card) 78' | Stadium: Vorskla Stadium; Attendance: 2,149; Referee: Serhiy Boyko |

| 18 August 2019 4 | FC Lviv | 0–2 | Shakhtar Donetsk | Lviv |
| 19:30 EEST (UTC+03:00) | Marthã (yellow card) 39'; Honchar (yellow card) 47'; Rafael Sabino (yellow card) 67'; Kvasnyi (yellow card) 90' | Report | Matviyenko (yellow card) 23'; Dentinho 31'; Marlos 37'; Stepanenko (yellow card) 59'; Marcos Antônio (yellow card) 87' | Stadium: Arena Lviv; Attendance: 6,380; Referee: Viktor Kopiyevskyi |

| 26 August 2019 5 | SC Dnipro-1 | 2–3 | FC Lviv | Dnipro |
| 19:00 EEST (UTC+03:00) | Chychykov (yellow card) 4'; Polyovyi 56', (yellow card) 74'; Gueye (yellow card) 64' (yellow-red card) 88'; Kulish 67' | Report | Honchar (yellow card) 11'; Renan 34'; China (yellow card) 39', (goal) 89' (pen.); Pernambuco 51'; Borzenko (yellow card) 59' | Stadium: Dnipro-Arena; Attendance: 4,648; Referee: Dmytro Kryvushkin |

| 31 August 2019 6 | FC Lviv | 0–1 | FC Mariupol | Lviv |
| 19:30 EEST (UTC+03:00) | Pryimak (yellow card) 25'; Renan (yellow card) 68'; Honchar (yellow card) 77'; Zubkov (yellow card) 90+1'; Kvasnyi (yellow card) 90+4' | Report | Vakula 61'; Myshnyov (yellow card) 84'; Kyryukhantsev (yellow card) 86' | Stadium: Ukraina Stadium; Attendance: 943; Referee: Anatoliy Abdula |

| 15 September 2019 7 | Kolos Kovalivka | 1–0 | FC Lviv | Kyiv |
| 19:30 EEST (UTC+03:00) | Lysenko (yellow card) 33'; Milko (yellow card) 38'; Kostyshyn 87' | Report | Rafael Sabino (yellow card) 2'; Lyulka (yellow card) 44'; Alvaro (yellow card) 60'; Bratkov (yellow card) 85' | Stadium: Obolon Arena; Attendance: 3,250; Referee: Oleksandr Omelchenko |

| 21 September 2019 8 | FC Lviv | 0–1 | Olimpik Donetsk | Lviv |
| 14:00 EEST (UTC+03:00) | Honchar (yellow card) 32' (yellow-red card) 45+1'; China (yellow card) 45'; Alvaro (yellow card) 67'; Nasonov (yellow card) 79'; Borzenko (yellow card) 86' | Report | Zaviyskyi (yellow card) 9'; Dieye (yellow card) 22'; Imeri (yellow card) 66'; Politylo (yellow card) 75', (goal) 80' (pen.); Lukyanchuk (yellow card) 90+4' | Stadium: Ukraina Stadium; Attendance: 550; Referee: Dmytro Kutakov |

| 28 September 2019 9 | FC Oleksandriya | 2–0 | FC Lviv | Oleksandriya |
| 19:30 EEST (UTC+03:00) | Banada 35', (yellow card) 54'; Miroshnichenko (yellow card) 40'; Hrechyshkin (yellow card) 72'; Bezborodko 90+2' | Report | Pedro Vitor (yellow card) 8'; Marthã (yellow card) 72' | Stadium: CSC Nika Stadium; Attendance: 1,297; Referee: Vitaliy Romanov |

| 5 October 2019 10 | FC Lviv | 0–0 | Zorya Luhansk | Lviv |
| 19:30 EEST (UTC+03:00) | Pernambuco (yellow card) 30'; Pedro Vitor (red card) 37'; Zubkov (yellow card) 85'; Alvaro (yellow card) 90+3' | Report | Rusyn (yellow card) 51'; Vernydub (yellow card) 57'; Yurchenko (yellow card) 71'; Arveladze (yellow card) 84'; Mykhaylychenko (yellow card) 90' | Stadium: Ukraina Stadium; Attendance: 945; Referee: Volodymyr Novokhatniy |

| 19 October 2019 11 | Karpaty Lviv | 0–0 | FC Lviv | Lviv |
| 14:00 EEST (UTC+03:00) | Hall (yellow card) 36'; Verbnyi (red card) 44'; Di Franco (yellow card) 67'; João Diogo (yellow card) 74' | Report | Lyulka (yellow card) 28'; Alvaro (yellow card) 30'; Marthã (yellow card) 32'; Bratkov (yellow card) 58'; Renan (yellow card) 76'; Rafael Sabino (red card) 79' | Stadium: Ukraina Stadium; Attendance: 5,434; Referee: Yevhen Aranovskyi |

| 27 October 2019 12 | FC Lviv | 1–4 | Desna Chernihiv | Lviv |
| 14:00 EET (UTC+02:00) | Alvaro (yellow card) 38'; Renan (yellow card) 57' (yellow-red card) 80'; Pernambuco 61'; Bohunov (yellow card) 65' | Report | Denys Favorov 2' (pen.); Khlyobas 9', 46'; Konoplya (yellow card) 20'; Dehtyarov 41'; Kartushov (yellow card) 83' | Stadium: Ukraina Stadium; Attendance: 712; Referee: Yaroslav Kozyk |

| 3 November 2019 13 | Dynamo Kyiv | 4–0 | FC Lviv | Kyiv |
| 17:00 EET (UTC+02:00) | Shaparenko 11'; Sydorchuk (yellow card) 16' (yellow-red card) 36'; Tsyhankov 30' (pen.); Besyedin 82'; Popov 90+1' | Report | Pryimak (yellow card) 29'; Marthã (yellow card) 54'; Honchar (yellow card) 84' | Stadium: NSC Olimpiyskiy; Attendance: 7,843; Referee: Anatoliy Abdula |

| 9 November 2019 14 | FC Lviv | 2–0 | Vorskla Poltava | Lviv |
| 17:00 EET (UTC+02:00) | Renan 13'; Pedro Vitor 41' (pen.) | Report | Luizão (yellow card) 14' (yellow-red card) 35'; Bayenko (yellow card) 24'; Sklyar (yellow card) 45'; Chesnakov (yellow card) 50'; Kravchenko (yellow card) 67'; Martynenko (yellow card) 72' (yellow-red card) 80' | Stadium: Ukraina Stadium; Attendance: 540; Referee: Maksym Kozyryatskyi |

| 22 November 2019 15 | Shakhtar Donetsk | 4–1 | FC Lviv | Kharkiv |
| 19:00 EET (UTC+02:00) | Moraes 11', 53', 76' (pen.), (yellow card) 78'; Stepanenko (yellow card) 24'; Alan Patrick 86', (yellow card) 87' | Report | Bratkov (yellow card) 19'; Tatarkov 25'; Bandura (yellow card) 70'; Rafael Sabino (yellow card) 75'; Alvaro (yellow card) 86' | Stadium: OSC Metalist; Attendance: 2,458; Referee: Dmytro Kryvushkin |

| 30 November 2019 16 | FC Lviv | 0–2 | SC Dnipro-1 | Lviv |
| 14:00 EET (UTC+02:00) | Pryimak (yellow card) 41' | Report | Korkishko 15'; Supriaha (yellow card) 43'; Lopyryonok (yellow card) 45+1'; Kohut 61' | Stadium: Ukraina Stadium; Attendance: 635; Referee: Ivan Bondar |

| 8 December 2019 17 | FC Mariupol | 0–0 | FC Lviv | Mariupol |
| 14:00 EET (UTC+02:00) | Tankovskyi (red card) 65'; Tyschenko (yellow card) 68'; Horbunov (yellow card) 74'; Vakula (yellow card) 88' | Report | China (yellow card) 19'; Bratkov (red card) 48'; Alvaro (yellow card) 62'; Rafael Sabino (yellow card) 86' | Stadium: Volodymyr Boiko Stadium; Attendance: 2,987; Referee: Serhiy Boyko |

| 14 December 2019 18 | FC Lviv | 3–2 | Kolos Kovalivka | Lviv |
| 14:00 EET (UTC+02:00) | Renan 13'; Tatarkov 32' (pen.); Bohunov (yellow card) 38'; Alvaro (yellow card) 55', (goal) 73'; Lyulka (yellow card) 57'; Sarnavskyi (red card) 60' | Report | Ilyin (yellow card) 7'; Paramonov 29'; Mihunov (yellow card) 30'; Vilhjálmsson (yellow card) 59'; Zozulya (yellow card) 88'; Lysenko 90+4' | Stadium: Ukraina Stadium; Attendance: 740; Referee: Yaroslav Kozyk |

| 23 February 2020 19 | Olimpik Donetsk | 0–1 | FC Lviv | Kyiv |
| 19:30 EET (UTC+02:00) | Lebedenko (yellow card) 39'; Tsymbalyuk (yellow card) 90+3' | Report | Rafael Sabino (yellow card) 26'; China (yellow card) 55'; Bohunov 84' | Stadium: Dynamo Stadium; Attendance: 357; Referee: Kostyantyn Trukhanov |

| 29 February 2020 20 | FC Lviv | 1–1 | FC Oleksandriya | Lviv |
| 14:00 EET (UTC+02:00) | Tatarkov (yellow card) 20' (yellow-red card) 53'; Bopesu (yellow card) 64'; Alvaro 87'; Rafael Sabino (yellow card) 90+2' | Report | Myshenko 10', (yellow card) 15'; Shendrik (yellow card) 69' | Stadium: Ukraina Stadium; Attendance: 920; Referee: Anatoliy Abdula |

| 4 March 2020 21 | Zorya Luhansk | 2–0 | FC Lviv | Zaporizhia |
| 17:00 EET (UTC+02:00) | Kabayev 54', (yellow card) 74'; Tymchyk (yellow card) 70'; Cigaņiks (yellow card) 76'; Lyednyev 89' | Report | Honchar (yellow card) 32'; Borzenko (yellow card) 38'; Bohunov (yellow card) 40'; Alvaro (yellow card) 70'; Bratkov (yellow card) 87' | Stadium: Slavutych-Arena; Attendance: 1,857; Referee: Dmytro Bondarenko |

| 8 March 2020 22 | FC Lviv | 0–0 | Karpaty Lviv | Lviv |
| 14:00 EET (UTC+02:00) | Lyulka (yellow card) 50'; Jonatan Lima (yellow card) 65' (yellow-red card) 90+1' | Report | Dubinchak (yellow card) 21'; Giorgadze (yellow card) 34'; Dieye (yellow card) 40' | Stadium: Ukraina Stadium; Attendance: 5,436; Referee: Viktor Kopiyevskyi |

| 14 March 2020 23 | FC Lviv | 1–1 | Karpaty Lviv | Lviv |
| 14:00 EET (UTC+02:00) | Iacovelli 50', (yellow card) 51'; Rafael Sabino (yellow card) 85'; Pryimak (yellow card) 89' | Report | Boiciuc (yellow card) 3'; Bratkov 27' (o.g.); Hall (yellow card) 30'; Klyots (yellow card) 49'; Pasich (yellow card) 83' (yellow-red card) 87' | Stadium: Ukraina Stadium; Attendance: 0 Referee: Dmytro Kutakov |
Note: Match was played behind closed doors due to quarantine in Ukraine during COVID-19 pandemic.

| 31 May 2020 24 | Vorskla Poltava | 1–1 | FC Lviv | Poltava |
| 14:00 EET (UTC+02:00) | Kane 13'; Sklyar (yellow card) 14' | Report | China (yellow card) 28', (goal) 90+4' (pen.); Alvaro (yellow card) 72'; Baiano (yellow card) 87' | Stadium: Vorskla Stadium; Attendance: 0 Referee: Maksym Kozyryatskyi |
Note: Match was played behind closed doors due to quarantine in Ukraine during COVID-19 pandemic.

| 7 June 2020 25 | FC Lviv | 1–2 | SC Dnipro-1 | Dnipro |
| 19:30 EEST (UTC+03:00) | China 31'; Bopesu (yellow card) 45+1'; Bohunov (yellow card) 82'; Pryimak (yellow card) 90+5' | Report | Lopyryonok (yellow card) 10'; Tsurikov 42'; Lucas Taylor (yellow card) 48'; Khoblenko 87' | Stadium: Dnipro-Arena; Attendance: 0 Referee: Yaroslav Kozyk |
Note: Match was played behind closed doors due to quarantine in Ukraine during COVID-19 pandemic.

| 13 June 2020 26 | Olimpik Donetsk | 2–0 | FC Lviv | Kyiv |
| 19:30 EEST (UTC+03:00) | Romanovskij (yellow card) 5'; Tsymbalyuk (yellow card) 33'; Zotko (yellow card) 35'; Do Couto 53', 84'; Kravchenko (yellow card) 81'; Kychak (yellow card) 90+3' | Report | China (yellow card) 24'; Borzenko (yellow card) 56'; Tatarkov (yellow card) 64'; Alvaro (yellow card) 68'; Nych (yellow card) 88' | Stadium: Dynamo Stadium; Attendance: 0 Referee: Dmytro Kryvushkin |
Note: Match was played behind closed doors due to quarantine in Ukraine during COVID-19 pandemic.

| 19 June 2020 27 | FC Mariupol | 3–0 | FC Lviv | Mariupol |
| 17:00 EEST (UTC+03:00) | Fedorchuk (yellow card) 2'; Fomin 5', 27'; Chobotenko (yellow card) 51'; Yavorskyi (yellow card) 63'; Polehenko (yellow card) 69'; Kashchuk (yellow card) 88', (goal) 90+2' | Report | Nych (yellow card) 21'; Bratkov (yellow card) 42'; Bopesu (yellow card) 45'; Pryimak (yellow card) 85'; Kravchuk (yellow card) 90+3' | Stadium: Volodymyr Boiko Stadium; Attendance: 0 Referee: Kostiantyn Trukhanov |
Note: Match was played behind closed doors due to quarantine in Ukraine during COVID-19 pandemic.

| 27 June 2020 28 | Karpaty Lviv | 1–1 | FC Lviv | Lutsk |
| 17:00 EEST (UTC+03:00) | Khakhlyov (yellow card) 16' (yellow-red card) 42'; Giorgadze (yellow card) 41'; Slyusar (yellow card) 58'; Deda 61'; Kudryk (yellow card) 90+4' | Report | Rafael Sabino 36'; China (yellow card) 70'; Bohunov (yellow card) 76' | Stadium: Avanhard Stadium; Attendance: 0 Referee: Andriy Kovalenko |
Note: Match was played behind closed doors due to quarantine in Ukraine during COVID-19 pandemic.

| 3 July 2020 29 | FC Lviv | 2–2 | Vorskla Poltava | Ternopil |
| 19:00 EEST (UTC+03:00) | Iacovelli (yellow card) 22', (goal) 55'; Tatarkov (yellow card) 45+1'; Sabino (yellow card) 52'; Honchar (yellow card) 70'; Borzenko 75' | Report | Chelyadin 8'; Gadzhuk (yellow card) 17'; Kravchuk (yellow card) 23', (goal) 89'; Melnychuk (yellow card) 62'; Dubko (yellow card) 74' | Stadium: Ternopilsky Misky Stadion; Attendance: 0 Referee: Yurii Ivanov |
Note: Match was played behind closed doors due to quarantine in Ukraine during COVID-19 pandemic.

| 11 July 2020 30 | SC Dnipro-1 | 3–2 | FC Lviv | Ternopil |
| 19:30 EEST (UTC+03:00) | Supriaha 25', 83'; Di Franco (yellow card) 32'; Lopyryonok (yellow card) 39'; Kravchenko (yellow card) 69'; Khoblenko 86' | Report | Renan 6', 19'; Rafael Sabino (yellow card) 36' (yellow-red card) 56'; Kravchuk (yellow card) 53' | Stadium: Ternopilsky Misky Stadion; Attendance: 0 Referee: Viktor Kopiyevskyi |
Note: Match was played behind closed doors due to quarantine in Ukraine during COVID-19 pandemic.

| 16 July 2020 31 | FC Lviv | 1–5 | Olimpik Donetsk | Lviv |
| 17:00 EEST (UTC+03:00) | Renan 4'; Nedolya (yellow card) 19' (yellow-red card) 40'; Bopesu (yellow card) 45+1'; Klymenchuk (yellow card) 80' | Report | Dehtyarov 16', 42'; Snurnitsyn (yellow card) 24'; Zahedi 26', 80', 90'; Lebedenko (yellow card) 51'; Zotko (yellow card) 53'; Kravchuk (yellow card) 75'; Zaviyskyi (yellow card) 76' | Stadium: Ukraina Stadium; Attendance: 0 Referee: Denys Shurman |
Note: Match was played behind closed doors due to quarantine in Ukraine during COVID-19 pandemic.

| 19 July 2020 32 | FC Lviv | 0–2 | FC Mariupol | Lviv |
| 17:00 EEST (UTC+03:00) | Komarets (yellow card) 31'; Rafael Sabino (yellow card) 57' | Report | Chekh 32'; Kulakov (yellow card) 39'; Churko 59' (pen.) | Stadium: Ukraina Stadium; Attendance: 0 Referee: Oleksandr Derdo |
Note: Match was played behind closed doors due to quarantine in Ukraine during COVID-19 pandemic.

=== Ukrainian Cup ===
| 25 September 2019 3rd preliminary round | Bukovyna Chernivtsi | 0–2 | FC Lviv | Chernivtsi |
| 15:30 EEST (UTC+03:00) | Hakman (yellow card) 12'; Poniedielnik (yellow card) 82' | Report | Zubkov (yellow card) 10'; Renan 17', 79' | Stadium: Bukovyna Stadium; Attendance: 2,500; Referee: Yaroslav Kozyk |

| 30 October 2019 Round of 16 (1/8) | FC Mynai | 2–0 | FC Lviv | Mynai |
| 14:00 EET (UTC+02:00) | Pynyashko (yellow card) 69'; Dopilka 76'; Hehedosh 83' | Report | Marthã (yellow card) 25'; Zubkov (yellow card) 32' (yellow-red card) 49'; Borzenko (yellow card) 38'; Honchar (yellow card) 45+1'; Bratkov (yellow card) 77' | Stadium: Mynai Arena; Attendance: 1,310; Referee: Oleksandr Omelchenko |

== Statistics ==
=== Appearances and goals ===
| No. | Pos | Nat | Player | Total | | Premier League | | Cup | |
| No. | Pos | Nat | Player | Apps | Goals | Apps | Goals | Apps | Goals |
Goalkeepers
| 23 | GK | (Ukraine) UKR | Bohdan Sarnavskyi | 26 | 0 | 25 | 0 | 1 | 0 |
| 94 | GK | (Ukraine) UKR | Herman Penkov | 2 | 0 | 2 | 0 | 0 | 0 |
Defenders
| 5 | DF | (Ukraine) UKR | Vladyslav Pryimak | 23 | 0 | 16+7 | 0 | 0 | 0 |
| 8 | DF | (Ukraine) UKR | Maksym Komarets | 1 | 0 | 1 | 0 | 0 | 0 |
| 9 | DF | (Ukraine) UKR | Mykyta Tatarkov | 19 | 2 | 19 | 2 | 0 | 0 |
| 21 | DF | (Ukraine) UKR | Ihor Honchar | 24 | 0 | 21+2 | 0 | 1 | 0 |
| 22 | DF | (Ukraine) UKR | Anton Bratkov | 32 | 0 | 29+1 | 0 | 2 | 0 |
| 33 | DF | (Ukraine) UKR | Serhiy Borzenko | 33 | 1 | 31 | 1 | 2 | 0 |
| 35 | DF | (Ukraine) UKR | Yuriy Kravchuk | 4 | 0 | 2+2 | 0 | 0 | 0 |
| 90 | DF | (Ukraine) UKR | Serhiy Lyulka | 20 | 0 | 17+2 | 0 | 1 | 0 |
| 95 | DF | (France) FRA | Joël Bopesu | 13 | 0 | 12+1 | 0 | 0 | 0 |
Midfielders
| 7 | MF | (Brazil) BRA | China | 27 | 4 | 22+3 | 4 | 1+1 | 0 |
| 10 | MF | (Brazil) BRA | Alvaro | 25 | 3 | 18+5 | 3 | 1+1 | 0 |
| 17 | MF | (Ukraine) UKR | Mykyta Khodakovskyi | 2 | 0 | 0+2 | 0 | 0 | 0 |
| 18 | MF | (Brazil) BRA | Baiano | 17 | 0 | 3+13 | 0 | 0+1 | 0 |
| 20 | MF | (Ukraine) UKR | Yehor Klymenchuk | 7 | 0 | 2+5 | 0 | 0 | 0 |
| 25 | MF | (Ukraine) UKR | Artem Nedolya | 3 | 0 | 1+2 | 0 | 0 | 0 |
| 30 | MF | (Brazil) BRA | Jonatan Lima | 6 | 0 | 5+1 | 0 | 0 | 0 |
| 43 | MF | (Ukraine) UKR | Andriy Vychizhanin | 1 | 0 | 0+1 | 0 | 0 | 0 |
| 93 | MF | (Ukraine) UKR | Yaroslav Bohunov | 28 | 1 | 15+11 | 1 | 2 | 0 |
| 96 | MF | (Brazil) BRA | Rafael Sabino | 23 | 1 | 20+2 | 1 | 0+1 | 0 |
Forwards
| 13 | FW | (Ukraine) UKR | Nazariy Nych | 8 | 0 | 2+6 | 0 | 0 | 0 |
| 14 | FW | (Brazil) BRA | Matheus Iacovelli | 13 | 2 | 8+5 | 2 | 0 | 0 |
| 19 | FW | (Brazil) BRA | Renan | 29 | 8 | 20+7 | 6 | 2 | 2 |
| 77 | FW | (Brazil) BRA | Filipe Pachtmann | 7 | 0 | 0+6 | 0 | 0+1 | 0 |
Players transferred out during the season
| 3 | DF | (Ukraine) UKR | Volodymyr Adamyuk | 3 | 0 | 3 | 0 | 0 | 0 |
| 9 | FW | (Brazil) BRA | Bruno Duarte | 3 | 1 | 3 | 1 | 0 | 0 |
| 11 | FW | (Brazil) BRA | Pernambuco | 19 | 3 | 14+3 | 3 | 2 | 0 |
| 13 | DF | (Ukraine) UKR | Oleksandr Nasonov | 2 | 0 | 1+1 | 0 | 0 | 0 |
| 24 | DF | (Ukraine) UKR | Ruslan Zubkov | 9 | 0 | 0+7 | 0 | 2 | 0 |
| 31 | GK | (Ukraine) UKR | Oleksandr Bandura | 7 | 0 | 5+1 | 0 | 1 | 0 |
| 32 | DF | (Brazil) BRA | Vicente | 3 | 0 | 1+2 | 0 | 0 | 0 |
| 43 | MF | (Ukraine) UKR | Stanislav Demkiv | 1 | 0 | 0 | 0 | 0+1 | 0 |
| 74 | MF | (Brazil) BRA | Marthã | 17 | 0 | 15 | 0 | 2 | 0 |
| 98 | MF | (Brazil) BRA | Pedro Vitor | 14 | 1 | 11+2 | 1 | 1 | 0 |
| 99 | DF | (Ukraine) UKR | Mykola Kvasnyi | 12 | 0 | 8+3 | 0 | 1 | 0 |

Source: Competitions

Last updated: 19 July 2020

=== Goalscorers ===
| Rank | No. | Pos | Nat | Name | Premier League | Cup | Total |
|---|---|---|---|---|---|---|---|
| 1 | 19 | FW | (Brazil) | Renan | 6 | 2 | 8 |
| 2 | 7 | MF | (Brazil) | China | 4 | 0 | 4 |
| 3 | 10 | MF | (Brazil) | Alvaro | 3 | 0 | 3 |
| 3 | 11 | FW | (Brazil) | Pernambuco | 3 | 0 | 3 |
| 5 | 9 | DF | (Ukraine) | Mykyta Tatarkov | 2 | 0 | 2 |
| 5 | 14 | FW | (Brazil) | Matheus Iacovelli | 2 | 0 | 2 |
| 7 | 9 | FW | (Brazil) | Bruno Duarte | 1 | 0 | 1 |
| 7 | 33 | DF | (Ukraine) | Serhiy Borzenko | 1 | 0 | 1 |
| 7 | 93 | MF | (Ukraine) | Yaroslav Bohunov | 1 | 0 | 1 |
| 7 | 96 | MF | (Brazil) | Rafael Sabino | 1 | 0 | 1 |
| 7 | 98 | MF | (Brazil) | Pedro Vitor | 1 | 0 | 1 |
| | | | | Total | 25 | 2 | 27 |

Last updated: 19 July 2020

=== Clean sheets ===
| Rank | No. | Pos | Nat | Name | Premier League | Cup | Total |
|---|---|---|---|---|---|---|---|
| 1 | 23 | GK | (Ukraine) | Bohdan Sarnavskyi | 5 | 1 | 6 |
| 1 | 94 | GK | (Ukraine) | Herman Penkov | 1 | 0 | 1 |
| | | | | Total | 6 | 1 | 7 |

Last updated: 19 July 2020

=== Disciplinary record ===
| No. | Pos | Nat | Player | Premier League | | | Cup | | | Total | | |
| No. | Pos | Nat | Player | Booked | (yellow card) (yellow-red card) | Sent off (straight red) | Booked | (yellow card) (yellow-red card) | Sent off (straight red) | Booked | (yellow card) (yellow-red card) | Sent off (straight red) |
| 3 | DF | (Ukraine) | Volodymyr Adamyuk | 2 | 0 | 0 | 0 | 0 | 0 | 2 | 0 | 0 |
| 5 | DF | (Ukraine) | Vladyslav Pryimak | 6 | 0 | 0 | 0 | 0 | 0 | 6 | 0 | 0 |
| 7 | MF | (Brazil) | China | 9 | 0 | 0 | 0 | 0 | 0 | 9 | 0 | 0 |
| 8 | DF | (Ukraine) | Maksym Komarets | 1 | 0 | 0 | 0 | 0 | 0 | 1 | 0 | 0 |
| 9 | FW | (Brazil) | Bruno Duarte | 1 | 0 | 0 | 0 | 0 | 0 | 1 | 0 | 0 |
| 9 | DF | (Ukraine) | Mykyta Tatarkov | 2 | 1 | 0 | 0 | 0 | 0 | 2 | 1 | 0 |
| 10 | MF | (Brazil) | Alvaro | 13 | 0 | 0 | 0 | 0 | 0 | 13 | 0 | 0 |
| 11 | FW | (Brazil) | Pernambuco | 1 | 0 | 0 | 0 | 0 | 0 | 1 | 0 | 0 |
| 13 | DF | (Ukraine) | Oleksandr Nasonov | 1 | 0 | 0 | 0 | 0 | 0 | 1 | 0 | 0 |
| 13 | FW | (Ukraine) | Nazariy Nych | 2 | 0 | 0 | 0 | 0 | 0 | 2 | 0 | 0 |
| 14 | FW | (Brazil) | Matheus Iacovelli | 1 | 0 | 0 | 0 | 0 | 0 | 1 | 0 | 0 |
| 18 | MF | (Brazil) | Baiano | 1 | 0 | 0 | 0 | 0 | 0 | 1 | 0 | 0 |
| 19 | FW | (Brazil) | Renan | 2 | 1 | 0 | 0 | 0 | 0 | 2 | 1 | 0 |
| 20 | MF | (Ukraine) | Yehor Klymenchuk | 1 | 0 | 0 | 0 | 0 | 0 | 1 | 0 | 0 |
| 21 | DF | (Ukraine) | Ihor Honchar | 6 | 1 | 0 | 1 | 0 | 0 | 7 | 1 | 0 |
| 22 | DF | (Ukraine) | Anton Bratkov | 5 | 0 | 1 | 1 | 0 | 0 | 6 | 0 | 1 |
| 23 | GK | (Ukraine) | Bohdan Sarnavskyi | 0 | 0 | 1 | 0 | 0 | 0 | 0 | 0 | 1 |
| 24 | DF | (Ukraine) | Ruslan Zubkov | 2 | 0 | 0 | 1 | 1 | 0 | 3 | 1 | 0 |
| 25 | MF | (Ukraine) | Artem Nedolya | 0 | 1 | 0 | 0 | 0 | 0 | 0 | 1 | 0 |
| 30 | MF | (Brazil) | Jonatan Lima | 1 | 0 | 0 | 0 | 0 | 0 | 0 | 1 | 0 |
| 31 | GK | (Ukraine) | Oleksandr Bandura | 1 | 0 | 0 | 0 | 0 | 0 | 1 | 0 | 0 |
| 33 | DF | (Ukraine) | Serhiy Borzenko | 5 | 0 | 0 | 1 | 0 | 0 | 6 | 0 | 0 |
| 35 | DF | (Ukraine) | Yuriy Kravchuk | 2 | 0 | 0 | 0 | 0 | 0 | 2 | 0 | 0 |
| 74 | MF | (Brazil) | Marthã | 5 | 0 | 0 | 1 | 0 | 0 | 6 | 0 | 0 |
| 90 | DF | (Ukraine) | Serhiy Lyulka | 4 | 0 | 0 | 0 | 0 | 0 | 4 | 0 | 0 |
| 93 | MF | (Ukraine) | Yaroslav Bohunov | 5 | 0 | 1 | 0 | 0 | 0 | 5 | 0 | 1 |
| 95 | DF | (France) | Joël Bopesu | 4 | 0 | 0 | 0 | 0 | 0 | 4 | 0 | 0 |
| 96 | MF | (Brazil) | Rafael Sabino | 10 | 1 | 1 | 0 | 0 | 0 | 10 | 1 | 1 |
| 98 | MF | (Brazil) | Pedro Vitor | 1 | 0 | 1 | 0 | 0 | 0 | 1 | 0 | 1 |
| 99 | DF | (Ukraine) | Mykola Kvasnyi | 4 | 0 | 0 | 0 | 0 | 0 | 4 | 0 | 0 |
| | | | Total | 98 | 6 | 4 | 5 | 1 | 0 | 103 | 7 | 4 |

Last updated: 19 July 2020

=== Attendances ===
| | Matches | Attendances | Average | High | Low |
|---|---|---|---|---|---|
| Premier League | 16 | 24,934 | 1,558 | 7,103 | 0 |
| Cup | 0 | 0 | 0 | 0 | 0 |
| Total | 16 | 24,934 | 1,558 | 7,103 | 0 |

Last updated: 19 July 2020
