= 2016–17 FC Dnipro season =

Dnipro Dnipropetrovsk
2016–17 season
- President: Ihor Kolomoyskyi
- Manager: Dmytro Mykhaylenko (caretaker)
- Stadium: Dnipro-Arena
- Ukrainian Premier League: 11th (relegated)
- Ukrainian Cup: Semi-finals
- Top goalscorer: League: Artem Dovbyk; Vladyslav Kocherhin (6 each); All: Artem Dovbyk; Vladyslav Kocherhin (6 each)
Home colours	Away colours

The 2016–17 season was 26th consecutive season in the top Ukrainian football league for FC Dnipro. Dnipro competed in Premier League and in the Ukrainian Cup. Dnipro would have qualified for the Europa League group stage as the third-placed team of the 2015–16 Ukrainian Premier League, but were excluded from participating in the 2016–17 European competitions by the UEFA Club Financial Control Body. The club was excluded from participating in the next UEFA club competition for which it would otherwise qualify in the next three seasons (2016/17, 2017/18 and 2018/19) for violating the Financial Fair Play regulations. Dnipro also was restricted from signing new players other than free agents by FFU for debts to Juande Ramos' staff.

On 26 October 2016, Dinpro was deducted six points for the same reason. In April 2017, Dnipro was deducted of a 3 points by FFU again. Tough financial situation and numerous sanctions from FFU and UEFA affected the results of the team and Dnipro relegated to Ukrainian First League for the first time in club history one matchday ahead of season finish. On 9 June 2017, after the end of the tournament, Dnipro was deducted of 9 more points, making it 24 points total. On the decision of FIFA, FFU enforced relegation of FC Dnipro straight to the Ukrainian Second League, skipping the Ukrainian First League. The club received its Second League attestation on 21 June 2017, making it Dnipro's first appearance in this division.

At the same time SC Dnipro-1 was formed in June 2017 as an alternative to FC Dnipro. Some of the players and manager of FC Dnipro Dmytro Mykhaylenko moved to new club. SC Dnipro-1 is registered to participate in Ukrainian Second League as well as FC Dnipro.

== Players ==
=== Squad information ===
Squad no.	Name	Nationality	Position	Date of birth (age)
Goalkeepers
1	Oleksiy Bashtanenko	(Ukraine)	GK	16 March 1994 (aged 23)
12	Andriy Lunin ^{List B}	(Ukraine)	GK	11 February 1999 (aged 18)
13	Danylo Kucher ^{List B}	(Ukraine)	GK	25 January 1997 (aged 20)
77	Denys Shelikhov	(Ukraine)	GK	23 June 1989 (aged 28)
Defenders
2	Alexandru Vlad	(Romania)	DF	6 December 1989 (aged 27)
3	Volodymyr Adamyuk	(Ukraine)	DF	17 July 1991 (aged 25)
8	Volodymyr Polyovyi	(Ukraine)	DF	28 July 1985 (aged 31)
14	Yevhen Cheberyachko	(Ukraine)	DF	19 June 1983 (aged 34)
22	Oleksandr Safronov ^{List B}	(Ukraine)	DF	11 June 1999 (aged 18)
33	Dmytro Nagiev ^{List B}	(Azerbaijan) (Ukraine)	DF	27 November 1995 (aged 21)
39	Oleksandr Svatok	(Ukraine)	DF	27 September 1994 (aged 22)
71	Maksym Lopyryonok ^{List B}	(Ukraine)	DF	13 April 1995 (aged 22)
Midfielders
4	Serhiy Kravchenko	(Ukraine)	MF	24 April 1983 (aged 34)
7	Yehor Nazaryna ^{List B}	(Ukraine)	MF	10 July 1997 (aged 19)
9	Yuriy Vakulko ^{List B}	(Ukraine)	MF	10 November 1997 (aged 19)
10	Vladyslav Kocherhin ^{List B}	(Ukraine)	MF	30 April 1996 (aged 21)
11	Yaroslav Homenko ^{List B}	(Ukraine)	MF	30 March 1999 (aged 18)
17	Denys Balanyuk ^{List B}	(Ukraine)	MF	16 January 1997 (aged 20)
23	Yevhen Cheberko ^{List B}	(Ukraine)	MF	23 January 1998 (aged 19)
25	Ihor Kohut ^{List B}	(Ukraine)	MF	7 March 1996 (aged 21)
29	Ruslan Rotan (Captain)	(Ukraine)	MF	29 October 1981 (aged 35)
87	Oleh Kozhushko ^{List B}	(Ukraine)	MF	17 February 1998 (aged 19)
Forwards
15	Artem Dovbyk ^{List B}	(Ukraine)	FW	21 June 1997 (aged 20)
18	Denys Kostyshyn ^{List B}	(Ukraine)	FW	31 August 1997 (aged 19)
19	Kamil Khuchbarov ^{List B}	(Ukraine)	FW	28 August 1999 (aged 17)
99	Maksym Lunyov ^{List B}	(Ukraine)	FW	22 May 1998 (aged 19)

== Transfers ==
=== In ===
Date	Pos.	Player	Age	Moving from	Type	Fee	Source
12 August 2016	FW	(Ukraine) Artem Dovbyk	19	(Moldova) Zaria Bălți	Transfer	Free	
18 August 2016	DF	(Brazil) Anderson Pico	27	(Brazil) Flamengo	Transfer	Free	
30 June 2016	MF	(Ukraine) Serhiy Kravchenko	33	(Ukraine) Volyn Lutsk	Loan return		
30 June 2016	MF	(Ukraine) Maksym Tretyakov	20	(Ukraine) Metalist	Loan return		
30 June 2016	MF	(Ukraine) Yevhen Bokhashvili	23	(Ukraine) Naftovyk-Ukrnafta	Loan return		

=== Out ===
Date	Pos.	Player	Age	Moving to	Type	Fee	Source
Summer
6 June 2016	DF	(Brazil) Léo Matos	30	(Greece) PAOK	Transfer	Undisclosed	
6 June 2016	MF	(Ukraine) Yevhen Shakhov	25	(Greece) PAOK	Transfer	Undisclosed	
10 June 2016	MF	(Portugal) Bruno Gama	28	(Spain) Deportivo La Coruña	Transfer	Undisclosed	
11 June 2016	DF	(Ukraine) Dmytro Chyhrynskyi	29	(Greece) AEK Athens	Transfer	Undisclosed	
27 June 2016	MF	(Brazil) Matheus	33	(China) SJZ Ever Bright	Transfer	Undisclosed	
30 June 2016	DF	(Ukraine) Vitaliy Mandzyuk	30	Unattached	Transfer	Free	
30 June 2016	MF	(Ukraine) Edmar	36	Unattached	Transfer	Free	
12 July 2016	MF	(Ukraine) Roman Bezus	26	(Belgium) Sint-Truiden	Transfer	Undisclosed	
16 July 2016	DF	(Croatia) Ivan Tomečak	26	(Saudi Arabia) Al-Nassr	Transfer	Undisclosed	
21 July 2016	MF	(Georgia (country)) Aleksandre Kobakhidze	29	(Ukraine) Vorskla Poltava	Transfer	Free	
22 July 2016	FW	(Ukraine) Maksym Salamakha	20	(Ukraine) Karpaty Lviv	Transfer	Free	
27 July 2016	DF	(Ukraine) Artem Fedetskyi	31	(Germany) Darmstadt	Transfer	Free	
27 July 2016	FW	(Ukraine) Roman Zozulya	26	(Spain) Real Betis	Transfer	Undisclosed	
4 August 2016	GK	(Czech Republic) Jan Laštůvka	34	(Czech Republic) MFK Karviná	Transfer	Free	
31 August 2016	DF	(Senegal) Papa Gueye	32	(Russia) FC Rostov	Transfer	Free	
10 September 2016	DF	(Brazil) Douglas	25	(Brazil) São Paulo	Transfer	Free	
13 September 2016	MF	(Ukraine) Maksym Tretyakov	20	(Ukraine) Chornomorets	Transfer	Free	
30 June 2016	DF	(Brazil) Anderson Pico	27	(Brazil) Flamengo	Loan return		
30 June 2016	MF	(Costa Rica) John Jairo Ruiz	22	(France) Lille	Loan return		
Winter
1 January 2017	GK	(Ukraine) Ihor Vartsaba	25	Unattached	Transfer	Free	
1 January 2017	DF	(Brazil) Anderson Pico	28	Unattached	Transfer	Free	
1 January 2017	MF	(Ukraine) Serhiy Nazarenko	36	Retired	Transfer	Free	
1 January 2017	MF	(Ukraine) Oleksandr Vasylyev	22	Unattached	Transfer	Free	
17 January 2017	MF	(Ukraine) Andriy Bliznichenko	22	(Turkey) Karabükspor	Transfer	Undisclosed	
30 January 2017	MF	(Ukraine) Valeriy Luchkevych	21	(Belgium) Standard Liège	Transfer	Undisclosed	
31 January 2017	FW	(Ukraine) Yevhen Bokhashvili	23	(Ukraine) Rukh Vynnyky	Transfer	Free	
7 February 2017	DF	(Ukraine) Oleksiy Larin	22	(Bulgaria) Dunav Ruse	Transfer	Undisclosed	
12 January 2017	MF	(Ukraine) Serhiy Politylo	28	(Kazakhstan) Okzhetpes	Transfer	Free	

== Pre-season and friendlies ==
26 June 2016 Friendly	Dnipro (Ukraine)	8–1	(Ukraine) Metalurh Zaporizhya	Dnipro
EEST (UTC+03:00)	Nazarenko 10', 39'; Bokhashvili 30', 33'; Bliznichenko 43'; Kohut 51', 75'; Kocherhin 77'	Report	Troianov 82'	Stadium: Dnipro train base

29 June 2016 Friendly	Dnipro (Ukraine)	1–1	(Ukraine) Helios Kharkiv	Dnipro
EEST (UTC+03:00)	Kireyev 50'	Report	Ivashko 75'	Stadium: Dnipro train base

6 July 2016 Friendly	Dnipro (Ukraine)	3–1	(Ukraine) Nikopol-NPHU	Dnipro
EEST (UTC+03:00)	Bezus 5'; Bokhashvili 33'; Kireyev 85'	Report	Goal	Stadium: Dnipro train base

8 July 2016 Friendly	Dnipro (Ukraine)	1–0	(Ukraine) Illichivets Mariupol	Dnipro
EEST (UTC+03:00)	Nazarenko 76'	Report		Stadium: Dnipro train base

11 July 2016 Friendly	Dnipro (Ukraine)	3–0	(Netherlands) VV Amstelveen	Doorwerth, Netherlands
18:50 EEST (UTC+03:00)	Vakulko 4'; Balanyuk 35'; Bliznichenko 90'	Report

13 July 2016 Friendly	Dnipro (Ukraine)	0–1	(Belgium) Standard Liège	Doorwerth, Netherlands
17:20 EEST (UTC+03:00)		Report	Emond 59'

16 July 2016 Friendly	Dnipro (Ukraine)	10–0	(Netherlands) SC Veluwezoom	Arnhem, Netherlands
15:00 EEST (UTC+03:00)	Kireyev 5', 11'; Nazarenko 50' (pen.), 79'; Vasylyev 53'; Lunyov 58', 90'; Bokhashvili 73', 86'; Nazaryna 73', 77'	Report

16 July 2016 Friendly	Dnipro (Ukraine)	2–1	(Germany) Fortuna-2 Düsseldorf	Doorwerth, Netherlands
18:00 EEST (UTC+03:00)	Balanyuk 17'; Vakulko 72'	Report	Balci 48'

20 July 2016 Friendly	Dnipro (Ukraine)	12–0	(Netherlands) Koot Azur	Mierlo, Netherlands
18:30 EEST (UTC+03:00)	Politylo 11', 17'; Vakulko 13'; Kocherhin 46', 49', 51'; Cheberko 55'; Zozulya 72'; Vasylyev 79'; Kireyev 81', 82', 84'	Report		Stadium: Sportpark De Ark

3 September 2016 Friendly	Zorya Luhansk (Ukraine)	1–1	(Ukraine) Dnipro	Zaporizhia
16:00 EEST (UTC+03:00)	Ljubenović 17'	Report	Bokhashvili 44'	Stadium: Torpedo Stadium

8 October 2016 Friendly	Dnipro (Ukraine)	1–2	(Ukraine) Vorskla Poltava	Horishni Plavni
14:00 EEST (UTC+03:00)	Bokhashvili 6'	Report	Khlyobas 2'; Bartulović 9'

13 November 2016 Friendly	Dnipro (Ukraine)	2–2	(Ukraine) FC Oleksandriya	Dnipro
EEST (UTC+02:00)	Lunyov 8'; Svatok 80'	Report	Starenkyi 36'; Hrytsuk 90'	Stadium: Dnipro train base

14 November 2016 Friendly	Dnipro (Ukraine)	7–1	(Ukraine) Dnipropetrovsk nat. police team	Dnipro
EEST (UTC+02:00)	Anderson Pico; Kohut; Kocherhin; Adamyuk; Politylo; Bokhashvili,	Report	Goal	Stadium: Dnipro train base

19 January 2017 Friendly	Dnipro (Ukraine)	2–0	(Azerbaijan) Shamkir FC	Turkey
16:00 EEST (UTC+02:00)	Kocherhin 23'; Kohut 78'	Report

23 January 2017 Friendly	Dnipro (Ukraine)	1–3	(Croatia) Dinamo Zagreb	Turkey
16:30 EEST (UTC+02:00)	Dovbyk 9'	Report	Gojak 38'; Machado 53'; Pavičić 88'

25 January 2017 Friendly	Dnipro (Ukraine)	0–2	(Croatia) Hajduk Split	Turkey
16:00 EEST (UTC+02:00)		Report	Vlašić 2'; Ohandza 63'

28 January 2017 Friendly	Dnipro (Ukraine)	2–4	(Georgia (country)) Dinamo Tbilisi	Antalya, Turkey
16:00 EEST (UTC+02:00)	Lunyov 25'; Dovbyk 67'	Report	Lobzhanidze 7', 55'; Arabuli 61', 63'	Stadium: Miracle football complex

29 January 2017 Friendly	Dnipro (Ukraine)	2–3	(North Macedonia) Rabotnički	Turkey
11:30 EEST (UTC+02:00)	Balanyuk 29', 39'	Report	Ivanovski 42'; Siljanovski 56'; Sahiti 72'

8 February 2017 Friendly	Dnipro (Ukraine)	Cancelled	(Poland) Podbeskidzie Bielsko-Biała	Turkey
EEST (UTC+02:00)		Report

8 February 2017 Friendly	Dnipro (Ukraine)	1–0	(Poland) Miedź Legnica	Turkey
15:00 EEST (UTC+02:00)	Nagiev 42'	Report

11 February 2017 Friendly	Dnipro (Ukraine)	2–2	(Bosnia and Herzegovina) Mladost Doboj Kakanj	Antalya, Turkey
16:00 EEST (UTC+02:00)	Dovbyk 8'; Polyovyi 46'	Report	Šišić 71'; Brkić 79'	Stadium: Miracle football complex

15 February 2017 Friendly	Dnipro (Ukraine)	Cancelled	(Georgia (country)) Torpedo Kutaisi	Turkey
EEST (UTC+02:00)		[ Report]

15 February 2017 Friendly	Dnipro (Ukraine)	1–2	(Georgia (country)) Locomotive Tbilisi	Turkey
16:00 EEST (UTC+02:00)	Lunyov 88'	[ Report]	Ubilava 61'; Rehviashvili 81'

19 February 2017 Friendly	Dnipro (Ukraine)	Cancelled	(Kazakhstan) FC Tobol	Turkey
EEST (UTC+02:00)		[ Report]

19 February 2017 Friendly	Dnipro (Ukraine)	3–1	(Georgia (country)) Dila Gori	Turkey
14:00 EEST (UTC+02:00)	Dovbyk 10', 26', 34'	Report	Leonardinho 88'

25 March 2017 Friendly	Dnipro (Ukraine)	1–0	(Ukraine) FC Oleksandriya	Dnipro
EEST (UTC+02:00)	Adamyuk 15'	Report		Stadium: Dnipro train base

== Competitions ==
=== Overall ===
Competition	Started round	Final position	First match	Last match
Premier League	Matchday 1	11th	24 July 2016	31 May 2017
Cup	Round of 16	Semi-final	26 October 2016	26 April 2017

Last updated:

=== Premier League ===
==== League table ====
Pos	Team	Pld	W	D	L	GF	GA	GD	Pts	Qualification or relegation
7	Vorskla Poltava (Note: Vorskla Poltava was awarded the UPL Prestige Trophy for winning the consolation tournament.)	32	11	9	12	32	32	0	42	
8	Stal Kamianske	32	11	8	13	27	31	−4	41	
9	Zirka Kropyvnytskyi	32	9	7	16	29	43	−14	34	
10	Karpaty Lviv (Note: Karpaty Lviv was deducted six points according to a decision by FIFA Disciplinary Committee on 4 March 2016.)	32	9	9	14	35	41	−6	30	
11	FC Dnipro (Note: FC Dnipro was deducted a total of 24 points (six points by the FIFA Disciplinary Committee for failing to clear their debts with former coach Juande Ramos and his assistants, six points by the Ukrainian Premier League for failing to comply with the decision of FIFA Disciplinary Committee to pay debts to former player Danilo Sousa Campos, three more points by the FFU Control and Disciplinary Committee for failing execute one of the decisions of the committee, and 9 more points on 9 June 2017, after the end of the tournament.). On the decision of FIFA, FFU enforced relegation of FC Dnipro straight to the Second League, skipping the First League. In a near future FFU will adopt a decision which team will be replacing Dnipro in the First League.) (R)	32	8	13	11	31	40	−9	13	Relegation to Ukrainian Second League
12	Volyn Lutsk (Note: Volyn Lutsk was deducted six points on the request of Football Federation of Ukraine which received a letter from the FIFA Disciplinary Committee on 11 May 2017 urging to implement its decision of 15 March 2017, due to debts with former player Saša Stević.) (R)	32	4	4	24	17	51	−34	10	Relegation to Ukrainian First League

Source: UEFA, Ukrainian Premier League, Soccerway
Rules for classification: 1) Points; 2) Goal difference; 3) Goals scored; 4) Head-to-head points; 5) Head-to-head goal difference; 6) Head-to-head goals scored; 7) Draw.
(R) Relegated

==== Results summary ====
Overall								Home						Away					
Pld	W	D	L	GF	GA	GD	Pts	W	D	L	GF	GA	GD	W	D	L	GF	GA	GD
31	8	13	10	31	37	−6	37	4	6	5	18	16	+2	4	7	5	13	21	−8

Last updated: 27 May 2017.
Source: Competitive matches

==== Results by round ====
Round	1	2	3	4	5	6	7	8	9	10	11	12	13	14	15	16	17	18	19	20	21	22	23	24	25	26	27	28	29	30	31	32
Ground	H	H	A	H	A	H	A	H	A	H	A	A	A	H	A	H	A	H	A	H	A	H	H	A	H	H	A	A	H	A	A	H
Result	W	D	L	D	L	W	L	L	D	L	D	L	D	L	W	L	W	D	D	D	D	D	W	D	D	W	W	D	L	W	L	P
Position	1	3	4	4	7	7	8	8	8	8	9	10	11	11	11	11	10	10	11	11	12	11	11	11	12	11	11	11	11	11	11	11

Updated to match(es) played on 31 May 2017. Source: Competitive matches
A = Away; H = Home; W = Win; D = Draw; L = Loss

==== Matches ====
24 July 2016 1	Dnipro	5–0	Volyn Lutsk	Dnipro
19:30 EEST (UTC+03:00)	Balanyuk 5', 21'; Kohut 15', (yellow card) 22'; Vakulko 85'; Kocherhin 90'	Report	Shapoval (yellow card) 41'; Lyashenko (yellow card) 90'	Stadium: Dnipro-Arena; Attendance: 7,163; Referee: Olexandr Derdo

31 July 2016 2	Dnipro	1–1	Stal Kamianske	Dnipro
17:00 EEST (UTC+03:00)	Kohut (yellow card) 58'; Bliznichenko 60'; Luchkevych (yellow card) 78'	Report	Ischenko (yellow card) 64'; Comvalius 79'	Stadium: Dnipro-Arena; Attendance: 8,861; Referee: Ihor Pashkal

6 August 2016 3	Dynamo Kyiv	1–0	Dnipro	Kyiv
19:30 EEST (UTC+03:00)	Moraes 62'; Buyalskyi (yellow card) 65'	Report	Cheberyachko (yellow card) 36'; Luchkevych (yellow card) 54'; Politylo (yellow card) 67'	Stadium: NSC Olimpiyskiy; Attendance: 17,286; Referee: Yuriy Vaks

13 August 2016 4	Dnipro	1–1	Vorskla Poltava	Dnipro
19:30 EEST (UTC+03:00)	Cheberyachko (yellow card) 18'; Bliznichenko 53'; Kohut (yellow card) 70'; Polyovyi (yellow card) 72'; Kravchenko (yellow card) 90'	Report	Khlyobas 67'; Chesnakov (yellow card) 71'; Sklyar (yellow card) 77'; Kolomoyets (yellow card) 87'	Stadium: Dnipro-Arena; Attendance: 7,005; Referee: Yevhen Aranovsky

21 August 2016 5	Shakhtar Donetsk	4–0	Dnipro	Lviv
17:00 EEST (UTC+03:00)	Ordets 13'; Dentinho 14'; Marlos 71'; Stepanenko (yellow card) 86'; Ferreyra 89'	Report		Stadium: Arena Lviv; Attendance: 3,358; Referee: Mykola Balakin

26 August 2016 6	Dnipro	2–0	Zorya Luhansk	Dnipro
19:00 EEST (UTC+03:00)	Rotan 3', (yellow card) 50'; Kravchenko (yellow card) 65'; Balanyuk 90+2'	Report		Stadium: Dnipro-Arena; Attendance: 6,199; Referee: Yuriy Mozharovsky

11 September 2016 7	Olimpik Donetsk	3–0	Dnipro	Sumy
19:30 EEST (UTC+03:00)	Bohdanov 10', 21', 50', (yellow card) 16'	Report	Adamyuk (yellow card) 19'; Bokhashvili (yellow card) 66'	Stadium: Yuvileiny Stadium; Attendance: 7,125; Referee: Oleksandr Derdo

17 September 2016 8	Dnipro	0–1	Zirka Kropyvnytskyi	Dnipro
19:30 EEST (UTC+03:00)	Vakulko (yellow card) 45+1'; Rotan (yellow card) 86'	Report	Pereyra (yellow card) 52'; Favorov (yellow card) 74'; Moya (yellow card) 85', (goal) 90+4'; Borja Ekiza (yellow card) 88'	Stadium: Dnipro-Arena; Attendance: 5,113; Referee: Yuriy Hryso

25 September 2016 9	Chornomorets Odesa	0–0	Dnipro	Odesa
19:30 EEST (UTC+03:00)	Filimonov (yellow card) 31'; Khoblenko (yellow card) 33'	Report		Stadium: Chornomorets Stadium; Attendance: 7,100; Referee: Yuriy Mozharovsky

1 October 2016 10	Dnipro	1–4	FC Oleksandriya	Dnipro
19:30 EEST (UTC+03:00)	Kocherhin (yellow card) 53', (goal) 85'; Rotan (yellow card) 76'	Report	Ponomar 11'; Yaremchuk 16', 61'; Mykytsey 37'	Stadium: Dnipro-Arena; Attendance: 4,825; Referee: Dmytro Kutakov

16 October 2016 11	Karpaty Lviv	1–1	Dnipro	Lviv
19:30 EEST (UTC+03:00)	Blanco Leschuk 29'; Zaviyskyi (yellow card) 55'	Report	Kohut 38'; Rotan (yellow card) 51'; Bokhashvili (yellow card) 52'	Stadium: Arena Lviv; Attendance: 2,308; Referee: Kateryna Monzul

22 October 2016 12	Volyn Lutsk	3–0	Dnipro	Lutsk
19:30 EEST (UTC+03:00)	Memeshev 26'; Dudik 55'; Petrov (yellow card) 65'; Shabanov (yellow card) 71'; Shapoval 86'; Marushka (yellow card) 90+4'	Report	Kohut (yellow card) 54'	Stadium: Avanhard Stadium; Attendance: 1,280; Referee: Olexandr Ivanov

30 October 2016 13	Stal Kamianske	1–1	Dnipro	Dnipro
19:30 EET (UTC+02:00)	Comvalius 51'	Report	Vakulko 70'	Stadium: Meteor Stadium; Attendance: 1,700; Referee: Yuriy Hryso

6 November 2016 14	Dnipro	1–2	Dynamo Kyiv	Dnipro
19:30 EEST (UTC+03:00)	Rotan 25' (pen.), (yellow card) 63'; Lunin (yellow card) 72'; Bliznichenko (yellow card) 84'	Report	Besyedin 21'; Sydorchuk 69'	Stadium: Dnipro-Arena; Attendance: 4,891; Referee: Kateryna Monzul

20 November 2016 15	Vorskla Poltava	1–2	Dnipro	Poltava
19:30 EET (UTC+02:00)	Tursunov 26'; Bartulović (yellow card) 78'	Report	Rotan 28'; Kozhushko (yellow card) 76'; Luchkevych 77'	Stadium: Vorskla Stadium; Attendance: 1,100; Referee: Oleksandr Ivanov

27 November 2016 16	Dnipro	0–2	Shakhtar Donetsk	Dnipro
19:30 EET (UTC+02:00)		Report	Kovalenko 36', 39'	Stadium: Dnipro-Arena; Attendance: 5,493; Referee: Yaroslav Kozyk

3 December 2016 17	Zorya Luhansk	2–3	Dnipro	Zaporizhia
17:00 EET (UTC+02:00)	Yarmash (yellow card) 17'; Sobol (yellow card) 27'; Bezborodko 57'; Karavayev 61'; Ljubenović (yellow card) 80'	Report	Kocherhin 14', 78'; Luchkevych 23'; Svatok (yellow card) 29'; Rotan (yellow card) 36'	Stadium: Slavutych-Arena; Attendance: 1,000; Referee: Serhiy Boyko

9 December 2016 18	Dnipro	1–1	Olimpik Donetsk	Dnipro
19:00 EET (UTC+02:00)	Lunyov (yellow card) 11'; Kravchenko (yellow card) 13' (yellow-red card) 67'; Rotan 29'; Vlad (yellow card) 83'; Lunin (yellow card) 90+1'	Report	Bohdanov (yellow card) 12'; Petrov (yellow card) 45'; Tanchyk 85'	Stadium: Dnipro-Arena; Attendance: 1,380; Referee: Yevhen Aranovskyi

25 February 2017 19	Zirka Kropyvnytskyi	1–1	Dnipro	Kropyvnytskyi
14:00 EET (UTC+02:00)	Sitalo 11'; Drachenko (yellow card) 58'	Report	Lopyryonok (yellow card) 16'; Rotan 42', (yellow card) 81'; Vakulko (yellow card) 57' (yellow-red card) 89'; Dovbyk (yellow card) 67'; Kocherhin (yellow card) 68'; Lunyov (yellow card) 84'	Stadium: Zirka Stadium; Attendance: 2,771; Referee: Ihor Paskhal

4 March 2017 20	Dnipro	1–1	Chornomorets Odesa	Dnipro
14:00 EET (UTC+02:00)	Dovbyk 14'; Svatok (yellow card) 30'; Rotan (yellow card) 83'; Kozhushko (yellow card) 84'	Report	Khocholava (yellow card) 32' (yellow-red card) 90+1'; Danchenko (yellow card) 45+2'; Khoblenko 75'; Karnoza (yellow card) 88'	Stadium: Dnipro-Arena; Attendance: 43; Referee: Anatoliy Zhabchenko

11 March 2017 21	FC Oleksandriya	0–0	Dnipro	Oleksandriya
17:00 EET (UTC+02:00)		Report	Lopyryonok (yellow card) 28'; Kocherhin (yellow card) 56'; Kohut (yellow card) 62'; Balanyuk (yellow card) 83'	Stadium: CSC Nika Stadium; Attendance: 3,520; Referee: Ivan Bondar

17 March 2017 22	Dnipro	0–0	Karpaty Lviv	Dnipro
17:00 EET (UTC+02:00)	Svatok (yellow card) 40'; Vlad (yellow card) 45'; Lopyryonok (yellow card) 65'	Report	Hladkyi (yellow card) 74'; Matviyenko (yellow card) 79'	Stadium: Dnipro-Arena; Referee: Dmytro Kutakov

1 April 2017 23	Dnipro	1–0	Zirka Kropyvnytskyi	Dnipro
14:00 EEST (UTC+03:00)	Nagiev 33'; Vlad (yellow card) 86'; Kozhushko (red card) 87'	Report	Popov (yellow card) 18'; Batsula (yellow card) 43'; Drachenko (yellow card) 59'; Fatyeyev (yellow card) 87'	Stadium: Dnipro-Arena; Attendance: 2,872; Referee: Mykola Kryvonosov

9 April 2017 24	Karpaty Lviv	2–2	Dnipro	Lviv
14:00 EEST (UTC+03:00)	Svatok 27' (o.g.); Khudobyak 68'; Nesterov (yellow card) 85'; Verbnyi (yellow card) 90+4'	Report	Kohut (yellow card) 29'; Dovbyk 50', 64'; Polyovyi (yellow card) 89'	Stadium: Arena Lviv; Attendance: 4,963; Referee: Kostyantyn Trukhanov

15 April 2017 25	Dnipro	0–0	Stal Kamianske	Dnipro
17:00 EEST (UTC+03:00)	Vakulko (yellow card) 75'; Balanyuk (yellow card) 85'	Report	Pankiv (yellow card) 26'; Ischenko (yellow card) 68'	Stadium: Dnipro-Arena; Attendance: 3,007; Referee: Oleksandr Ivanov

22 April 2017 26	Dnipro	2–0	Vorskla Poltava	Dnipro
17:00 EEST (UTC+03:00)	Kocherhin 15', (yellow card) 86'; Dovbyk 54'	Report	Odaryuk (yellow card) 66'	Stadium: Dnipro-Arena; Attendance: 2,231; Referee: Mykola Kryvonosov

30 April 2017 27	Volyn Lutsk	0–1	Dnipro	Lutsk
14:00 EEST (UTC+03:00)	Goropevšek (yellow card) 11'; Memeshev (yellow card) 54'; Teterenko (yellow card) 83'; Shapoval (yellow card) 90+3'	Report	Polyovyi (yellow card) 32'; Kohut (yellow card) 42'; Adamyuk (yellow card) 67'; Cheberko 90' (pen.)	Stadium: Avanhard Stadium; Attendance: 1,222; Referee: Kostyantyn Truhanov

7 May 2017 28	Zirka Kropyvnytskyi	1–1	Dnipro	Kropyvnytskyi
17:00 EEST (UTC+03:00)	Pereyra 48'; Zahalskyi (yellow card) 69'; Zbun (yellow card) 81'; Polehenko (yellow card) 89'	Report	Cheberko 7', (yellow card) 37'; Adamyuk (yellow card) 34'; Dovbyk (yellow card) 52'; Svatok (yellow card) 69'; Kocherhin (yellow card) 83'; Lunyov (yellow card) 86'	Stadium: Zirka Stadium; Attendance: 4,110; Referee: Dmytro Kutakov

14 May 2017 29	Dnipro	2–3	Karpaty Lviv	Dnipro
19:30 EEST (UTC+03:00)	Lunyov (yellow card) 44'; Kocherhin 47'; Dovbyk 54'; Vakulko (yellow card) 61'; Adamyuk (yellow card) 72'	Report	Hrysyo (yellow card) 63', (goal) 74'; Ksyonz 65'; Nesterov 70'; Hladkyi (yellow card) 80'; Verbnyi (yellow card) 86'	Stadium: Dnipro-Arena; Attendance: 4,654; Referee: Anatoliy Abdula

20 May 2017 30	Stal Kamianske	0–1	Dnipro	Dnipro
17:00 EEST (UTC+03:00)	Stamenković (yellow card) 10'; Shabanov (yellow card) 54'; Klymchuk (yellow card) 86'	Report	Balanyuk 41'; Vlad (yellow card) 68'	Stadium: Meteor Stadium; Attendance: 1,500; Referee: Yevhen Aranovsky

27 May 2017 31	Vorskla Poltava	1–0	Dnipro	Poltava
17:00 EEST (UTC+03:00)	Chyzhov (yellow card) 24'; Sharpar 49'; Kravchenko (yellow card) 76'	Report	Rotan (yellow card) 72'	Stadium: Vorskla Stadium; Attendance: 1,700; Referee: Yaroslav Kozyk

31 May 2017 32	Dnipro	1–0 ^{(1)}	Volyn Lutsk	Dnipro
17:00 EEST (UTC+03:00)	Dovbyk 32'	Report		Stadium: Dnipro-Arena; Referee: Ivan Bondar

Notes:

- ^(1) Match was not finished due to the fans behavior after fire landed near the referee.

=== Ukrainian Cup ===
26 October 2016 Round of 16	Desna Chernihiv	0–0 (6–7 p)	Dnipro	Kyiv
15:00 EEST (UTC+03:00)	Koberidze (yellow card) 115'	Report	Rotan (yellow card) 64'; Kocherhin (yellow card) 71'; Kravchenko (yellow card) 75'; Vakulko (yellow card) 99'; Kozhushko (yellow card) 109'	Stadium: Obolon Arena; Attendance: 2,070; Referee: Olexandr Dashko
	Penalties
	Melnyk (penalty scored); Maksymenko (penalty missed); Chornomorets (penalty missed); Favorov (penalty scored); Mostovyi (penalty scored); Filippov (penalty scored); Chepurnenko (penalty scored); Kartushov (penalty scored)		(penalty scored) Anderson Pico; (penalty scored) Vakulko; (penalty scored) Rotan; (penalty scored) Lopyryonok; (penalty scored) Bliznichenko; (penalty scored) Kozhushko; (penalty missed) Vlad; (penalty scored) Kravchenko

30 November 2016 Quarterfinal	Dnipro	1–0	Vorskla Poltava	Dnipro
19:00 EET (UTC+02:00)	Balanyuk 73'	Report	Siminin (yellow card) 62'; Tursunov (yellow card) 81' (yellow-red card) 82'	Stadium: Dnipro-Arena; Attendance: 1,401; Referee: Anatoliy Zhabchenko

26 April 2017 Semi-final	Shakhtar Donetsk	1–0	Dnipro Dnipropetrovsk	Kharkiv
20:00 EEST (UTC+03:00)	Taison 66'; Shevchenko (yellow card) 90+2'	Report	Vakulko (yellow card) 57'; Svatok (yellow card) 82'	Stadium: OSC Metalist; Attendance: 4,751; Referee: Oleksandr Derdo

== Statistics ==
=== Appearances and goals ===
No.	Pos	Nat	Player	Total		Premier League		Cup	
No.	Pos	Nat	Player	Apps	Goals	Apps	Goals	Apps	Goals
Goalkeepers
1	GK	(Ukraine) UKR	Oleksiy Bashtanenko	3	0	3	0	0	0
12	GK	(Ukraine) UKR	Andriy Lunin	25	0	22	0	3	0
77	GK	(Ukraine) UKR	Denys Shelikhov	7	0	7	0	0	0
Defenders
2	DF	(Romania) ROU	Alexandru Vlad	25	0	22	0	3	0
3	DF	(Ukraine) UKR	Volodymyr Adamyuk	31	0	27+1	0	3	0
8	DF	(Ukraine) UKR	Volodymyr Polyovyi	20	0	18+1	0	1	0
14	DF	(Ukraine) UKR	Yevhen Cheberyachko	14	0	14	0	0	0
33	DF	(Azerbaijan) AZE	Dmytro Nagiev	14	1	11+2	1	1	0
39	DF	(Ukraine) UKR	Oleksandr Svatok	34	0	31	0	3	0
71	DF	(Ukraine) UKR	Maksym Lopyryonok	23	0	20	0	3	0
Midfielders
4	MF	(Ukraine) UKR	Serhiy Kravchenko	17	0	15	0	2	0
7	MF	(Ukraine) UKR	Yehor Nazaryna	1	0	0+1	0	0	0
9	MF	(Ukraine) UKR	Yuriy Vakulko	28	2	22+4	2	1+1	0
10	MF	(Ukraine) UKR	Vladyslav Kocherhin	27	6	16+9	6	2	0
17	MF	(Ukraine) UKR	Denys Balanyuk	27	5	15+10	4	1+1	1
23	MF	(Ukraine) UKR	Yevhen Cheberko	15	2	7+7	2	1	0
25	MF	(Ukraine) UKR	Ihor Kohut	23	2	12+10	2	0+1	0
29	MF	(Ukraine) UKR	Ruslan Rotan	22	5	17+2	5	3	0
87	MF	(Ukraine) UKR	Oleh Kozhushko	15	0	2+11	0	1+1	0
Forwards
15	FW	(Ukraine) UKR	Artem Dovbyk	23	6	17+5	6	1	0
18	FW	(Ukraine) UKR	Denys Kostyshyn	1	0	0+1	0	0	0
99	FW	(Ukraine) UKR	Maksym Lunyov	24	0	15+6	0	2+1	0
Players transferred out during the season
7	MF	(Ukraine) UKR	Andriy Bliznichenko	16	2	10+5	2	0+1	0
11	FW	(Ukraine) UKR	Yevhen Bokhashvili	3	0	2+1	0	0	0
24	MF	(Ukraine) UKR	Valeriy Luchkevych	11	2	10	2	1	0
28	MF	(Ukraine) UKR	Serhiy Nazarenko	4	0	1+3	0	0	0
36	DF	(Brazil) BRA	Anderson Pico	7	0	3+3	0	0+1	0
89	MF	(Ukraine) UKR	Serhiy Politylo	15	0	13+1	0	1	0

Source: Competitive matches

Last updated: 31 May 2017

=== Goalscorers ===
Rank	No.	Pos	Nat	Name	Premier League	Cup	Total
1	10	MF	(Ukraine)	Vladyslav Kocherhin	6	0	6
1	15	FW	(Ukraine)	Artem Dovbyk	6	0	6
3	17	MF	(Ukraine)	Denys Balanyuk	4	1	5
3	29	MF	(Ukraine)	Ruslan Rotan	5	0	5
5	7	MF	(Ukraine)	Andriy Bliznichenko	2	0	2
5	9	MF	(Ukraine)	Yuriy Vakulko	2	0	2
5	23	MF	(Ukraine)	Yevhen Cheberko	2	0	2
5	24	MF	(Ukraine)	Valeriy Luchkevych	2	0	2
5	25	MF	(Ukraine)	Ihor Kohut	2	0	2
10	33	DF	(Azerbaijan)	Dmytro Nagiev	1	0	1

Last updated: 31 May 2017.
Source: Competitive matches

=== Clean sheets ===
Rank	No.	Pos	Nat	Name	Premier League	Cup	Total
1	12	GK	(Ukraine)	Andriy Lunin	8	2	10
2	77	GK	(Ukraine)	Denys Shelikhov	2	0	2
3	1	GK	(Ukraine)	Oleksiy Bashtanenko	1	0	1

Last updated: 31 May 2017.
Source: Competitive matches

=== Disciplinary record ===
No.	Pos	Nat	Player	Premier League			Cup			Total		
No.	Pos	Nat	Player	Booked	(yellow card) (yellow-red card)	Sent off (straight red)	Booked	(yellow card) (yellow-red card)	Sent off (straight red)	Booked	(yellow card) (yellow-red card)	Sent off (straight red)
2	DF	(Romania)	Alexandru Vlad	4	0	0	0	0	0	4	0	0
3	DF	(Ukraine)	Volodymyr Adamyuk	4	0	0	0	0	0	4	0	0
4	MF	(Ukraine)	Serhiy Kravchenko	2	1	0	1	0	0	3	1	0
7	MF	(Ukraine)	Andriy Bliznichenko	1	0	0	0	0	0	1	0	0
8	DF	(Ukraine)	Volodymyr Polyovyi	3	0	0	0	0	0	3	0	0
9	MF	(Ukraine)	Yuriy Vakulko	4	1	0	1	0	0	5	1	0
10	MF	(Ukraine)	Vladyslav Kocherhin	5	0	0	1	0	0	6	0	0
11	FW	(Ukraine)	Yevhen Bokhashvili	2	0	0	0	0	0	2	0	0
12	GK	(Ukraine)	Andriy Lunin	2	0	0	0	0	0	2	0	0
14	DF	(Ukraine)	Yevhen Cheberyachko	2	0	0	0	0	0	2	0	0
15	FW	(Ukraine)	Artem Dovbyk	2	0	0	0	0	0	2	0	0
17	MF	(Ukraine)	Denys Balanyuk	2	0	0	0	0	0	2	0	0
23	MF	(Ukraine)	Yevhen Cheberko	1	0	0	0	0	0	1	0	0
24	MF	(Ukraine)	Valeriy Luchkevych	2	0	0	0	0	0	2	0	0
25	MF	(Ukraine)	Ihor Kohut	7	0	0	0	0	0	7	0	0
29	MF	(Ukraine)	Ruslan Rotan	9	0	0	1	0	0	10	0	0
39	DF	(Ukraine)	Oleksandr Svatok	5	0	0	0	0	0	5	0	0
71	DF	(Ukraine)	Maksym Lopyryonok	3	0	0	0	0	0	3	0	0
87	MF	(Ukraine)	Oleh Kozhushko	2	0	1	1	0	0	3	0	1
89	MF	(Ukraine)	Serhiy Politylo	1	0	0	0	0	0	1	0	0
99	MF	(Ukraine)	Maksym Lunyov	4	0	0	0	0	0	4	0	0

Last updated: 27 May 2017.
Source: Competitive matches
