= Andriy Lunin =

Ukrainian footballer (born 1999)

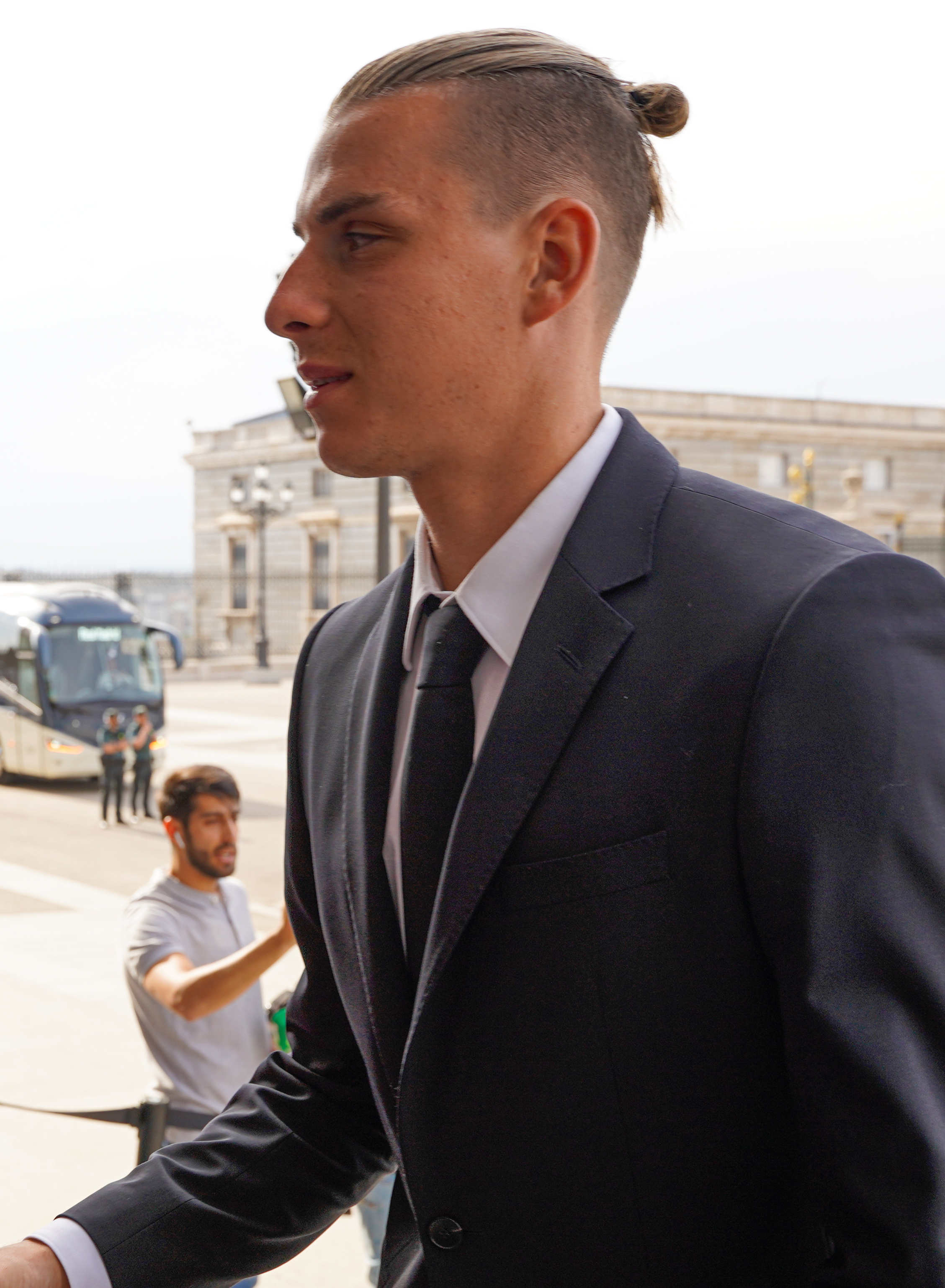
- Lunin in 2022

Personal information
- Full name: Andriy Oleksiyovych Lunin
- Date of birth: 11 February 1999 (age 27)
- Place of birth: Berestyn, Ukraine
- Height: 1.91 m (6 ft 3 in)
- Position: Goalkeeper

Team information
- Current team: Real Madrid
- Number: 13

Youth career
- 2012–2015: Metalist Kharkiv
- 2015–2016: Dnipro

Senior career*
Years	Team	Apps	(Gls)
2016–2017	Dnipro	22	(0)
2017–2018	Zorya Luhansk	29	(0)
2018–	Real Madrid	44	(0)
2018–2019	→ Leganés (loan)	5	(0)
2019–2020	→ Valladolid (loan)	0	(0)
2020	→ Oviedo (loan)	20	(0)

International career^{‡}
2014–2015	Ukraine U16	5	(0)
2015–2016	Ukraine U17	9	(0)
2016	Ukraine U18	1	(0)
2017	Ukraine U19	3	(0)
2019	Ukraine U20	6	(0)
2017–2018	Ukraine U21	5	(0)
2018–	Ukraine	16	(0)
Medal record
Men's football
Representing Ukraine
FIFA U-20 World Cup
Winner	2019
- * Club domestic league appearances and goals as of 22:02, 25 October 2026 (UTC) ‡ National team caps and goals as of 19:03, 11 June 2025 (UTC)

Andriy Oleksiyovych Lunin (Ukrainian: Андрі́й Олексі́йович Лу́нін; born 11 February 1999) is a Ukrainian professional footballer who plays as a goalkeeper for La Liga club Real Madrid and the Ukraine national team.

Lunin began his senior career in Ukraine with Dnipro before joining Zorya Luhansk. He signed for Real Madrid in 2018 and subsequently spent time on loan with Leganés, Real Valladolid and Oviedo. After returning to Madrid, he served mainly as a backup to Thibaut Courtois, but became the club's starting goalkeeper for much of the 2023–24 season following Courtois' injury. Lunin played a key role in Madrid's run to the Champions League final, as the club won La Liga and the UEFA Champions League.

Lunin represented Ukraine at youth level and was part of the team that won the 2019 FIFA U-20 World Cup. He made his senior debut for the Ukraine national team in 2018 and later represented the country at major international tournaments.

== Club career ==
=== Early career ===
Lunin was a player for Metalist Youth Sportive School (first trainer was Oleksandr Khrabrov) and Dnipro Youth Sportive School Systems (first trainer was Kostiantyn Pavliuchenko).

=== Dnipro ===
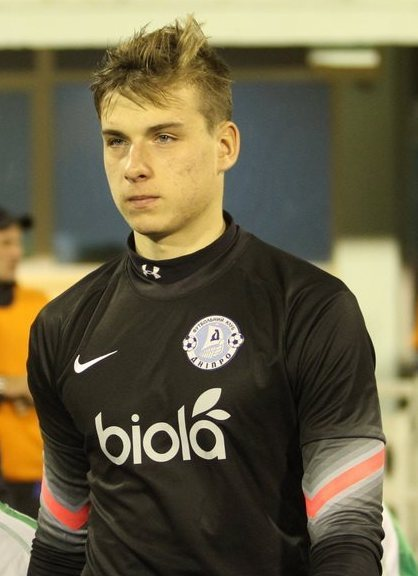
Lunin with Dnipro in 2016

From summer 2016, after graduation of the youth sportive school, he played in the Dnipro reserves. In the main-team squad, Lunin made his debut as a start-squad player at the age of 17, in the match against Karpaty Lviv on 16 October 2016 in the Ukrainian Premier League. He was Dnipro's first choice goalkeeper the rest of the season, playing in a total of 25 matches for the club, across the league and club competitions. However, at the end of the season, due to financial irregularities, Dnipro was relegated directly to the Ukrainian Second League (third level of football), and many players, Lunin included, were allowed to leave the club.

=== Zorya Luhansk ===
Lunin spent the 2017–18 season playing for Zorya Luhansk, where he once again quickly established himself as the first keeper. On 14 September 2017, Lunin made his European debut in a 0–2 Europa League group stage loss to Östersunds at the Arena Lviv. He ended up playing in 36 matches across all competitions that season, including all six of Zorya's Europa League matches.

=== Real Madrid ===
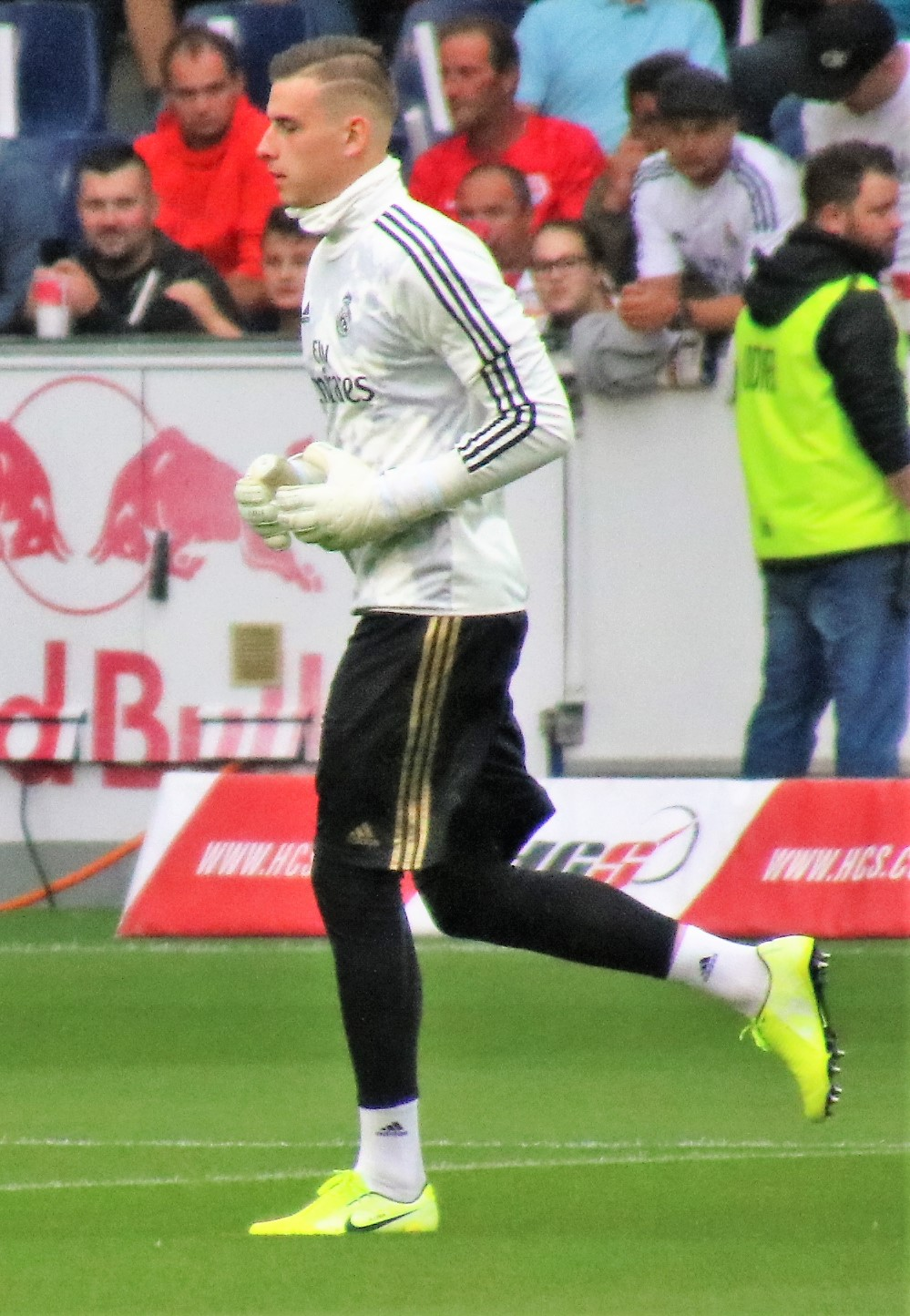
Lunin training with Real Madrid in 2019

On 19 June 2018, La Liga club Real Madrid reached an agreement with Zorya Luhansk to sign Lunin in a reportedly €8.5 million plus 5 million add-ons deal. On 27 August 2018, he was loaned to nearby fellow La Liga team Leganés, for the season. Halfway through the campaign, he stated that he was content with being second choice to Iván Cuéllar, and would complete his contract.

On 13 August 2019, he was loaned to Real Valladolid for the 2019–20 season. On 15 October 2019, Lunin was included in the 20 best under-21 players shortlist for the 2019 Golden Boy award.

On 15 January 2020, the loan with Real Valladolid was terminated. On the same day, Real Oviedo announced the loan of Lunin until 30 June 2020.

On 20 January 2021, he made his first team debut for Real Madrid in a 1–2 extra time loss to Alcoyano in the 2020–21 Copa del Rey. With Madrid confirmed 2021–22 champions, Lunin made his league debut on 8 May 2022 in the Madrid derby against Atlético Madrid, which Real lost 1–0. On 15 May 2022, he played against Cádiz, saving a penalty and allowing his team to draw 1–1 away from home.

On 5 October 2022, Lunin made his Champions League debut in a 2–1 win against Shakhtar Donetsk. On 16 October 2022, he became the first Ukrainian player to feature in El Clásico against Barcelona, with Real winning 3–1.

On 8 November 2023, Lunin was called to action in Real Madrid's Champions League group stage match against Braga after Kepa suffered an injury during the warm-up. Lunin made a significant contribution to the team's performance by saving a penalty shot from Braga winger Álvaro Djaló in the fourth minute of the game, which helped maintain Real Madrid's lead in their group standings.

On 13 February 2024, in a standout performance during Real Madrid's Champions League knockout stage match against RB Leipzig at the Red Bull Arena, Lunin equaled Thibaut Courtois' 2022 UEFA Champions League final record by making nine saves in a single match, which garnered significant acclaim from the manager Carlo Ancelotti. Ancelotti hailed it as Lunin's "best game" for the club, emphasising the goalkeeper's critical role in securing a strong position for Real Madrid to advance in the competition.

On 17 April 2024, Lunin made eight saves in the Champions League quarter-finals' second leg against Manchester City, which ended in a 1–1 draw, and then went on to stop Manchester City players Bernardo Silva and Mateo Kovačić's penalties in the shootout, securing Real Madrid's advancement to the semi-finals.

On 13 September 2024, Lunin extended his contract, signing a new five-year deal to remain at Madrid until 2030.

== International career ==
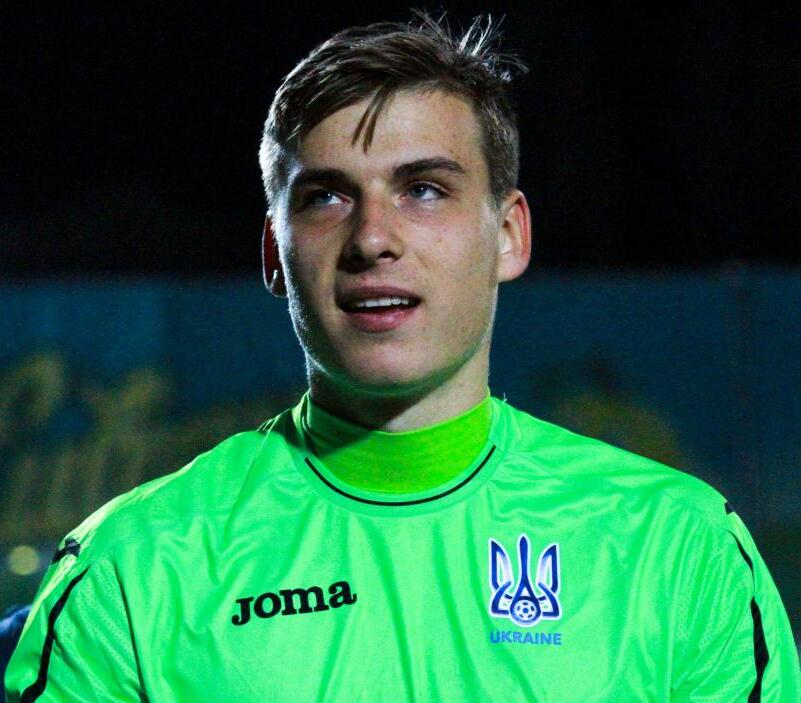
Lunin with Ukraine U21 in 2018

In 2019, Lunin backstopped Ukraine U20 team to their first ever FIFA U-20 World Cup victory. He played in six of his team's seven matches, but missed the quarterfinal match against Colombia due to being called up to Ukraine's main squad for the UEFA Euro 2020 qualifying matches against Serbia and Luxembourg. After the 3–1 final match victory against South Korea, Lunin was awarded the Golden Glove as the best goalkeeper of the tournament.

On 23 March 2018, Lunin debuted for the Ukraine national team in a 1–1 friendly draw against Saudi Arabia. At the age of 19 years and 40 days, he became the youngest debutant in the national team during that time, surpassing the previous records set by Maksym Koval and Oleksandr Shovkovskyi.

In May 2024, Lunin was called up to represent Ukraine at UEFA Euro 2024.

== Personal life ==
Lunin married his girlfriend Anastasia Tomazova in a civil ceremony in 2021.

== Career statistics ==
=== Club ===
As of match played 25 October 2026

Appearances and goals by club, season and competition
Club	Season	League			National cup (Note: Includes Ukrainian Cup, Copa del Rey)		Europe		Other		Total	
Club	Season	Division	Apps	Goals	Apps	Goals	Apps	Goals	Apps	Goals	Apps	Goals
Dnipro	2016–17	Ukrainian Premier League	22	0	3	0	—		—		25	0
Zorya Luhansk	2017–18	Ukrainian Premier League	29	0	1	0	6 (Note: Appearances in UEFA Europa League)	0	—		36	0
Leganés (loan)	2018–19	La Liga	5	0	2	0	—		—		7	0
Valladolid (loan)	2019–20	La Liga	0	0	2	0	—		—		2	0
Oviedo (loan)	2019–20	Segunda División	20	0	—		—		—		20	0
Real Madrid	2020–21	La Liga	0	0	1	0	0	0	0	0	1	0
Real Madrid	2021–22	La Liga	2	0	2	0	0	0	0	0	4	0
Real Madrid	2022–23	La Liga	7	0	1	0	2 (Note: Appearances in UEFA Champions League)	0	2 (Note: Appearances in FIFA Club World Cup)	0	12	0
Real Madrid	2023–24	La Liga	21	0	1	0	8	0	1 (Note: Appearance in Supercopa de España)	0	31	0
Real Madrid	2024–25	La Liga	7	0	5	0	2	0	0	0	14	0
Real Madrid	2025–26	La Liga	6	0	2	0	4	0	0	0	12	0
Real Madrid	2026–27	La Liga	1	0	0	0	0	0	0	0	1	0
Real Madrid	Total		44	0	12	0	16	0	3	0	75	0
Career total			120	0	20	0	22	0	3	0	165	0

=== International ===
As of match played 10 June 2025

Appearances and goals by national team and year
National team	Year	Apps	Goals
Ukraine	2018	3	0
Ukraine	2019	2	0
Ukraine	2020	1	0
Ukraine	2021	0	0
Ukraine	2022	3	0
Ukraine	2023	0	0
Ukraine	2024	4	0
Ukraine	2025	3	0
Total		16	0

== Honours ==
Real Madrid

- La Liga: 2021–22, 2023–24
- Copa del Rey: 2022–23
- Supercopa de España: 2022, 2024
- UEFA Champions League: 2021–22, 2023–24
- UEFA Super Cup: 2022, 2024
- FIFA Club World Cup: 2022
- FIFA Intercontinental Cup: 2024

Ukraine U20

- FIFA U-20 World Cup: 2019

Individual

- Golden talent of Ukraine: 2017 (U-19)
- FIFA U-20 World Cup Golden Glove: 2019
