= Matheus Iacovelli =

Brazilian footballer

Personal information
- Full name: Matheus Felipe Camargo Iacovelli
- Date of birth: 13 March 1998 (age 28)
- Place of birth: Rio de Janeiro, Brazil
- Height: 1.80 m (5 ft 11 in)
- Position: Winger

Team information
- Current team: America-RJ
- Number: 11

Youth career
- 2015–2016: Palmeiras
- 2016: Flamengo

Senior career*
Years	Team	Apps	(Gls)
2016–2017	Palmeiras	1	(0)
2017–2020	Estoril	0	(0)
2017–2018	→ Real SC (loan)	2	(0)
2018	→ Paraná (loan)	2	(0)
2019	→ Operário-MS (loan)	2	(0)
2020	Lviv	13	(2)
2020	Betim	1	(0)
2021	Azuriz	2	(0)
2021	Catanduva	10	(5)
2022	Gama	7	(3)
2022	Paraná Clube	14	(1)
2022–2023	Flamurtari	12	(5)
2023	XV De Piracicaba	12	(1)
2024	Sampaio Corrêa	5	(1)
2025–	America-RJ		
- * Club domestic league appearances and goals

Matheus Felipe Camargo Iacovelli (born 13 March 1998 in Rio de Janeiro) is a Brazilian professional footballer who plays as a winger for Campeonato Carioca Série A2 club America-RJ.
