= Denys Balanyuk =

Ukrainian footballer (born 1997)

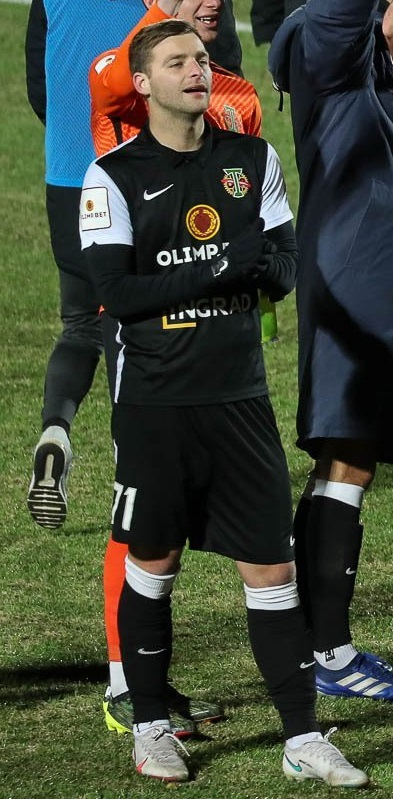
- Balanyuk with Torpedo Moscow in 2021

Personal information
- Full name: Denys Serhiyovych Balanyuk
- Date of birth: 16 January 1997 (age 29)
- Place of birth: Odesa, Ukraine
- Height: 1.78 m (5 ft 10 in)
- Position: Striker

Youth career
- 2010–2012: DYuSSh №11 Odesa
- 2012–2013: Dnipro Dnipropetrovsk

Senior career*
| Years | Team | Apps | (Gls) |
| 2013–2017 | Dnipro | 27 | (4) |
| 2017–2019 | Wisła Kraków | 9 | (0) |
| 2018–2019 | → Arsenal Kyiv (loan) | 8 | (0) |
| 2020 | Olimpik Donetsk | 8 | (1) |
| 2020–2021 | Torpedo Moscow | 16 | (2) |
| 2021 | Mariehamn | 1 | (0) |
| 2022–2023 | Spartak Varna | 24 | (5) |
| 2023 | Samgurali Tsqaltubo | 8 | (2) |

International career
| 2012 | Ukraine U16 | 4 | (0) |
| 2014 | Ukraine U17 | 5 | (1) |
| 2015 | Ukraine U19 | 2 | (1) |
| 2016 | Ukraine U21 | 1 | (0) |
- * Club domestic league appearances and goals as of 17 January 2024

Denys Serhiyovych Balanyuk (Ukrainian: Денис Сергійович Баланюк; born 16 January 1997) is a Ukrainian professional footballer who plays as a striker.

== Career ==
Balanyuk is a product of the sports school ♯11 in Odesa. His first trainer was Anatoliy Matsanskyi. At his 15 he joined FC Dnipro academy.

He made his debut for FC Dnipro in the match against FC Shakhtar Donetsk on 23 May 2015 in the Ukrainian Premier League.

Balanyuk scored 2 goals early in the first half for his 1st league start and 3rd appearance for Dnipro in a 5–0 win over Volyn Lutsk on 24 July.

On 9 September 2017 he signed a contract with Polish team Wisła Kraków. On 29 June 2018 he was loaned to Ukrainian Premier League club Arsenal Kyiv. In September 2022, Balanyuk joined Bulgarian club Spartak Varna on a two-year contract.

== International career ==
Balanyuk was named in the preliminary 31-players senior national squad for the 2018 FIFA World Cup qualification match against Iceland on 5 September 2016.
