= Ihor Kohut =

Ukrainian footballer

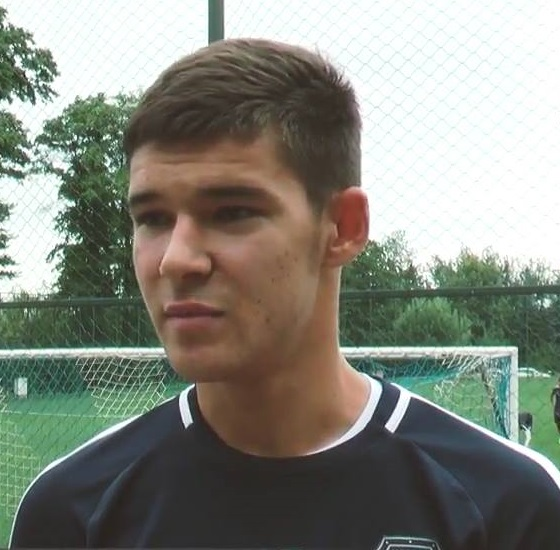

Personal information
- Full name: Ihor Romanovych Kohut
- Date of birth: 7 March 1996 (age 30)
- Place of birth: Dnipropetrovsk, Ukraine
- Height: 1.84 m (6 ft 0 in)
- Position: Midfielder

Team information
- Current team: Metalist 1925 Kharkiv
- Number: 17

Youth career
- 2007–2016: Dnipro Dnipropetrovsk

Senior career*
| Years | Team | Apps | (Gls) |
| 2016–2017 | Dnipro Dnipropetrovsk | 22 | (2) |
| 2017–2024 | Dnipro-1 | 149 | (36) |
| 2024– | Metalist 1925 Kharkiv | 27 | (0) |
| 2025 | → Chornomorets Odesa (loan) | 8 | (0) |

International career^{‡}
| 2016 | Ukraine U20 | 1 | (0) |
- * Club domestic league appearances and goals as of 3 June 2026 ‡ National team caps and goals as of 23 July 2017

Ihor Romanovych Kohut (Ukrainian: Ігор Романович Когут; born 7 March 1996) is a Ukrainian professional footballer who plays as a midfielder for Ukrainian Premier League side Metalist 1925 Kharkiv.

== Career ==
Kohut is a product of the FC Dnipro Youth Sportive School System. His first trainers were Ihor Khomenko and Yevhen Kovalenko.

He made his debut for FC Dnipro in the match against FC Volyn Lutsk on 24 July 2016 in the Ukrainian Premier League scoring a header off a cross to make the score 2–0. The game would eventually end 5–0.

In February 2025 Kohut went on loan to Chornomorets Odesa.

== Career statistics ==
As of 31 December 2021

Appearances and goals by club, season and competition
| Club | Season | League | | | Cup | | Continental | | Other | | Total | |
| Club | Season | Division | Apps | Goals | Apps | Goals | Apps | Goals | Apps | Goals | Apps | Goals |
|---|---|---|---|---|---|---|---|---|---|---|---|---|
| Dnipro | 2015–16 | Ukrainian Premier League | 0 | 0 | 0 | 0 | 0 | 0 | — | | 0 | 0 |
| Dnipro | 2016–17 | Ukrainian Premier League | 22 | 2 | 1 | 0 | — | | — | | 23 | 2 |
| Dnipro | Total | | 22 | 2 | 1 | 0 | 0 | 0 | — | | 23 | 2 |
| Dnipro-1 | 2017–18 | Ukrainian Second League | 30 | 15 | 6 | 2 | — | | — | | 36 | 17 |
| Dnipro-1 | 2018–19 | Ukrainian First League | 24 | 11 | 4 | 1 | — | | — | | 28 | 12 |
| Dnipro-1 | 2019–20 | Ukrainian Premier League | 24 | 4 | 2 | 0 | — | | — | | 26 | 4 |
| Dnipro-1 | 2020–21 | Ukrainian Premier League | 20 | 2 | 3 | 1 | — | | — | | 23 | 3 |
| Dnipro-1 | 2021–22 | Ukrainian Premier League | 13 | 0 | 2 | 1 | — | | — | | 15 | 1 |
| Dnipro-1 | Total | | 111 | 32 | 17 | 5 | — | | — | | 128 | 37 |
| Career total | | | 133 | 34 | 18 | 5 | — | | — | | 151 | 39 |
