= Welves =

Brazilian footballer

Personal information
- Full name: Welves Santos Damacena
- Date of birth: 24 November 2000 (age 25)
- Place of birth: Poções, Brazil
- Height: 1.66 m (5 ft 5 in)
- Position: Forward

Team information
- Current team: Carlos Renaux
- Number: 18

Senior career*
Years	Team	Apps	(Gls)
2019	Lokomotíva Košice	6	(1)
2019–2022	Lviv	19	(0)
2021	→ Zira (loan)	2	(0)
2022	→ Nõmme Kalju (loan)	8	(0)
2022–2023	Trofense	4	(0)
2023	→ Fontinhas (loan)	3	(0)
2023–2024	São Bernardo		
2024–2025	Resende		
2025	Serra Branca		
2025–2026	Águia de Marabá		
2026–	Carlos Renaux	7	(1)
- * Club domestic league appearances and goals as of 20 February 2026

Welves Santos Damacena (born 24 November 2000) is a Brazilian footballer who as of February 2026 plays for the Brazilian club Carlos Renaux as a forward.

== Career statistics ==
=== Club ===
As of 2 July 2021.

Club	Season	League			Cup		Other		Total	
Club	Season	Division	Apps	Goals	Apps	Goals	Apps	Goals	Apps	Goals
Lokomotíva Košice	2018–19	2. Liga	6	1	0	0	0	0	6	1
FC Lviv	2019–20	Ukrainian Premier League	16	0	1 (Note: Appearances in the Ukrainian Cup)	0	0	0	17	0
FC Lviv	2020–21	Ukrainian Premier League	3	0	1	0	0	0	4	0
FC Lviv	Total		19	0	2	0	0	0	21	0
Zira FK (loan)	2021–22	Azerbaijan Premier League	0	0	0	0	0	0	0	0
Career total			25	1	2	0	0	0	27	1
