= Mykola Kvasnyi =

Ukrainian footballer

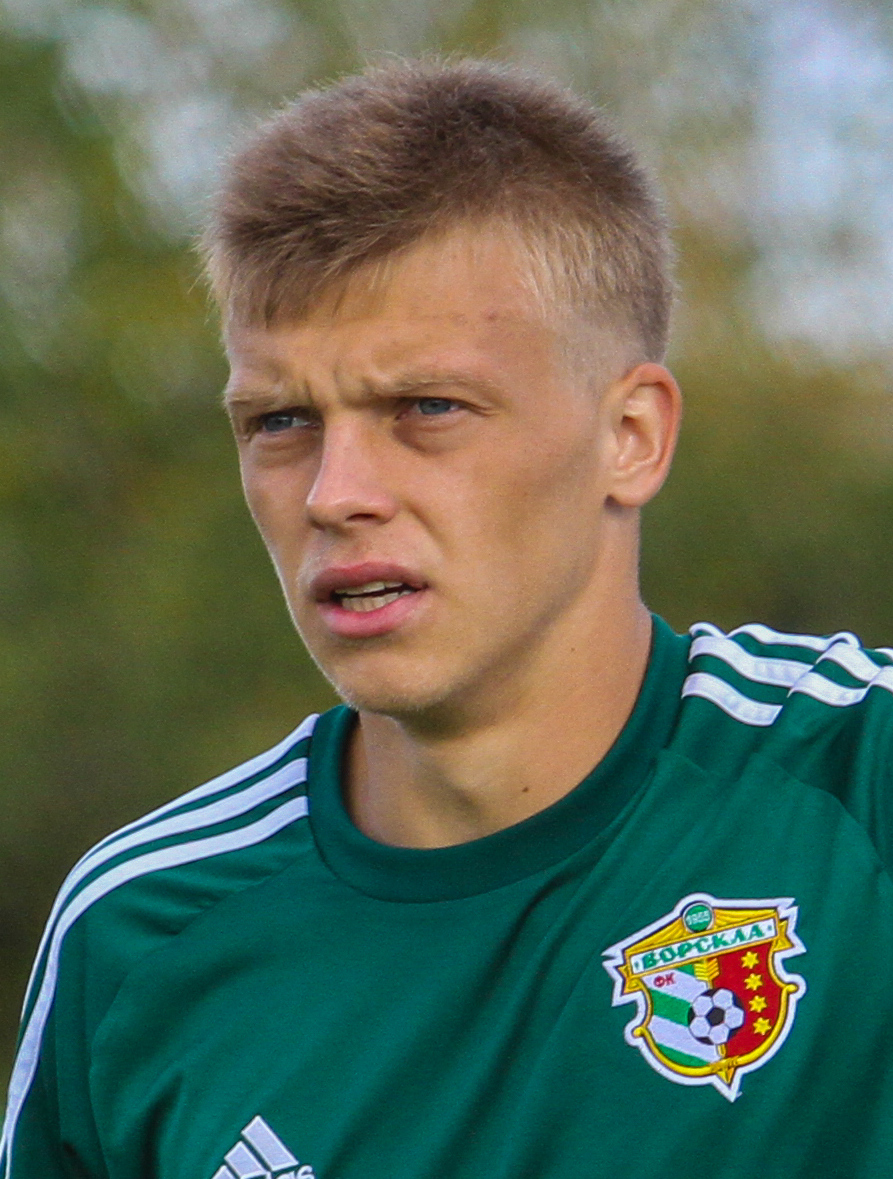

Personal information
- Full name: Mykola Petrovych Kvasnyi
- Date of birth: 4 January 1995 (age 31)
- Place of birth: Dolyna, Ukraine
- Height: 1.83 m (6 ft 0 in)
- Position: Defender

Team information
- Current team: Kulykiv-Bilka

Youth career
- 2007–2009: Knyazha Shchaslyve
- 2009–2010: Zirka Kyiv
- 2010–2012: Knyazha Shchaslyve

Senior career*
| Years | Team | Apps | (Gls) |
| 2012–2013 | Arsenal Kyiv | 0 | (0) |
| 2014 | Tavriya Simferopol | 0 | (0) |
| 2014–2017 | Vorskla Poltava | 3 | (0) |
| 2017–2018 | Sumy | 14 | (0) |
| 2018–2019 | Prykarpattia Ivano-Frankivsk | 23 | (0) |
| 2019 | Lviv | 11 | (0) |
| 2020–2021 | Inhulets Petrove | 23 | (0) |
| 2021 | Prykarpattia Ivano-Frankivsk | 9 | (0) |
| 2022–2023 | Veres Rivne | 4 | (0) |
| 2023–2024 | Ahrobiznes Volochysk | 23 | (0) |
| 2025 | Kulykiv-Bilka | 6 | (0) |
- * Club domestic league appearances and goals as of 15 May 2026

Mykola Kvasnyi (Ukrainian: Микола Петрович Квасний; born 4 January 1995) is a Ukrainian footballer who played as a defender.

== Career ==
Kvasnyi is a product of the two Kyivan youth sportive schools. His first trainer was Mykola Lytovchak in FC Knyazha Shchaslyve.

From July 2012 until 2014 Kvasnyi played in the Ukrainian Premier League Reserves for clubs FC Arsenal Kyiv and SC Tavriya Simferopol. From July 2014 he continued his career in the Ukrainian Premier League Reserves club FC Vorskla Poltava. And in summer 2015 Kvasnyi was promoted to the main-squad team of FC Vorskla in the Ukrainian Premier League. He made his debut for Vorskla Poltava in the Ukrainian Premier League in a match against FC Dynamo Kyiv on 4 October 2015.

In December 2024 he moved to Kulykiv-Bilka in Ukrainian Second League. He got retired.
