= Volodymyr Adamyuk =

Ukrainian football defender

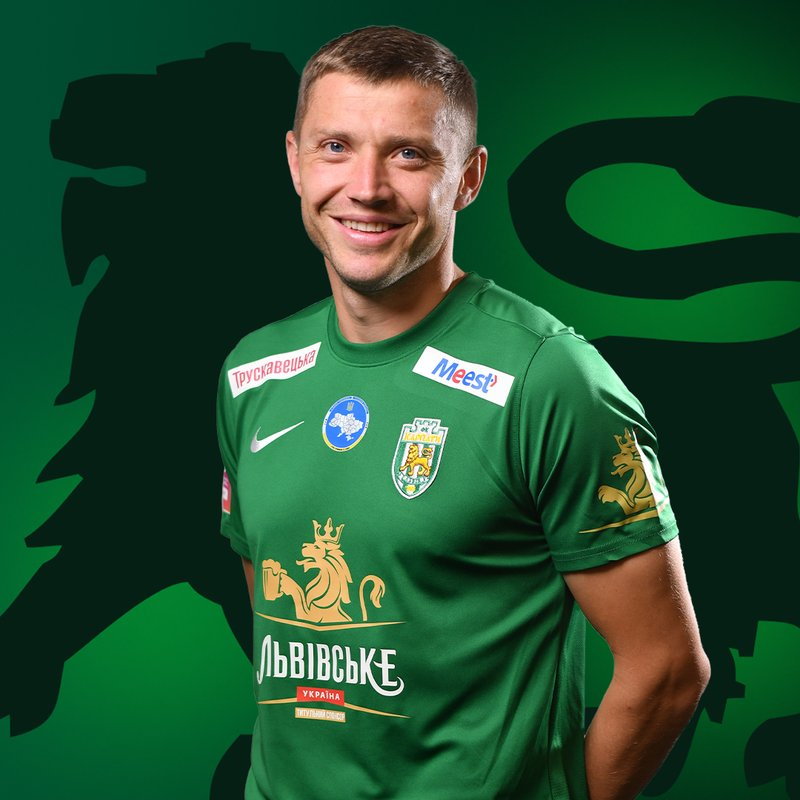

Personal information
- Full name: Volodymyr Mykhaylovych Adamyuk
- Date of birth: 17 July 1991 (age 35)
- Place of birth: Sivka-Kaluska, Ivano-Frankivsk Oblast, Soviet Union (now Ukraine)
- Height: 1.85 m (6 ft 1 in)
- Position: Right-back

Team information
- Current team: Karpaty Lviv
- Number: 3

Youth career
- 2005–2008: Youth Sportive School Kalush

Senior career*
| Years | Team | Apps | (Gls) |
| 2008–2010 | Kalush | 0 | (0) |
| 2010–2012 | Tuzhyliv | 0 | (0) |
| 2012–2013 | Krono-Karpaty Broshniv-Osada | 29 | (7) |
| 2013 | Krymteplytsia Molodizhne | 9 | (0) |
| 2013–2015 | Stal Dniprodzerzhynsk | 74 | (9) |
| 2016–2017 | Dnipro | 31 | (0) |
| 2017–2018 | Veres Rivne | 30 | (3) |
| 2018–2019 | Lviv | 35 | (3) |
| 2020–2024 | Dnipro-1 | 88 | (8) |
| 2024–26 | Karpaty Lviv | 28 | (0) |
| 2026- | FC Oleksandriya | 10 | (1) |
- * Club domestic league appearances and goals as of 25 October 2026 @ 13:19(AEST)

Volodymyr Mykhaylovych Adamyuk (Ukrainian: Володимир Михайлович Адамюк; born 17 July 1991) is a Ukrainian professional footballer who plays as a right-back for Karpaty Lviv.

== Career ==
=== Early years ===
Adamyuk is a product of the Youth sportive school Kalush and his first trainer was Yuriy Malyar.

=== Amateur years ===
He spent his early career as player in the amateur level.

=== Krymteplytsia Molodizhne ===
In March 2013 signed a contract with the Ukrainian First League team Krymteplytsia Molodizhne.

== Career statistics ==
As of 24 October 2021

| Club | Season | League | | | National Cup | | Continental | | Other | | Total | |
| Club | Season | Division | Apps | Goals | Apps | Goals | Apps | Goals | Apps | Goals | Apps | Goals |
|---|---|---|---|---|---|---|---|---|---|---|---|---|
| Krono-Karpaty Broshniv-Osada | 2012 | Ivano-Frankivsk Oblast Championship | 29 | 7 | 3 | 0 | — | | — | | 32 | 7 |
| Krono-Karpaty Broshniv-Osada | Total | | 29 | 7 | 3 | 0 | — | | — | | 32 | 7 |
| Krymteplytsia Molodizhne | 2012–13 | Ukrainian First League | 9 | 0 | 0 | 0 | — | | — | | 9 | 0 |
| Krymteplytsia Molodizhne | Total | | 9 | 0 | 0 | 0 | — | | — | | 9 | 0 |
| Stal Dniprodzerzhynsk | 2013–14 | Ukrainian Second League | 33 | 7 | 2 | 0 | — | | — | | 35 | 7 |
| Stal Dniprodzerzhynsk | 2014–15 | Ukrainian First League | 25 | 1 | 3 | 0 | — | | — | | 28 | 1 |
| Stal Dniprodzerzhynsk | 2015–16 | Ukrainian Premier League | 16 | 1 | 3 | 1 | — | | — | | 19 | 2 |
| Stal Dniprodzerzhynsk | Total | | 74 | 9 | 8 | 1 | — | | — | | 82 | 10 |
| Dnipro Dnipropetrovsk | 2015–16 | Ukrainian Premier League | 3 | 0 | 1 | 0 | 0 | 0 | — | | 4 | 0 |
| Dnipro Dnipropetrovsk | 2016–17 | Ukrainian Premier League | 28 | 0 | 3 | 0 | — | | — | | 31 | 0 |
| Dnipro Dnipropetrovsk | Total | | 31 | 0 | 4 | 0 | 0 | 0 | — | | 35 | 0 |
| Veres Rivne | 2017–18 | Ukrainian Premier League | 30 | 3 | 2 | 0 | — | | — | | 32 | 3 |
| Veres Rivne | Total | | 30 | 3 | 2 | 0 | — | | — | | 32 | 3 |
| Lviv | 2018–19 | Ukrainian Premier League | 32 | 3 | 1 | 0 | — | | — | | 33 | 3 |
| Lviv | 2019–20 | Ukrainian Premier League | 3 | 0 | 0 | 0 | — | | — | | 3 | 0 |
| Lviv | Total | | 35 | 3 | 1 | 0 | — | | — | | 36 | 3 |
| Dnipro-1 | 2019–20 | Ukrainian Premier League | 12 | 1 | 0 | 0 | — | | — | | 12 | 1 |
| Dnipro-1 | 2020–21 | Ukrainian Premier League | 16 | 1 | 3 | 0 | — | | — | | 19 | 1 |
| Dnipro-1 | 2021–22 | Ukrainian Premier League | 11 | 1 | 0 | 0 | — | | — | | 11 | 1 |
| Dnipro-1 | Total | | 39 | 3 | 3 | 0 | — | | — | | 42 | 3 |
| Career total | | | 247 | 25 | 21 | 1 | 0 | 0 | — | | 268 | 26 |
