= Andriy Vychizhanin =

Ukrainian footballer

Personal information
- Full name: Andriy Yuriyovych Vychizhanin
- Date of birth: 18 August 1999 (age 27)
- Place of birth: Radekhiv, Lviv Oblast, Ukraine
- Height: 1.81 m (5 ft 11 1/2 in)
- Position: Midfielder

Team information
- Current team: Zdrój Horyniec (on loan from Karpaty Halych)

Youth career
- 2011–2017: Lviv

Senior career*
Years	Team	Apps	(Gls)
2017–2018	Veres Rivne	0	(0)
2018–2021	Lviv	1	(0)
2021–	Karpaty Halych	27	(2)
2022–	→ Zdrój Horyniec (loan)		
- * Club domestic league appearances and goals as of 13 August 2022

Andriy Yuriyovych Vychizhanin (Ukrainian: Андрій Юрійович Вичіжанін; born 18 August 1999) is a Ukrainian professional footballer who plays as a midfielder for Polish club Zdrój Horyniec. He is also under suspended contract with Karpaty Halych.

== Career ==
Vychizhanin is a product of the FC Lviv youth sportive school system.

He made his debut for FC Lviv as a second half-time substituted player in the losing home match against FC Mariupol on 19 July 2020 in the Ukrainian Premier League.
