= Oleksandr Vasylyev =

Ukrainian footballer

Personal information
- Full name: Oleksandr Andriyovych Vasylyev
- Date of birth: 27 April 1994 (age 32)
- Place of birth: Kyiv, Ukraine
- Height: 1.86 m (6 ft 1 in)
- Position: Midfielder

Team information
- Current team: Viktoriya Sumy
- Number: 5

Youth career
- 2007–2011: Dynamo Kyiv

Senior career*
Years	Team	Apps	(Gls)
2011–2012	Dynamo Kyiv	0	(0)
2012–2016	Dnipro Dnipropetrovsk	2	(0)
2017	Polissya Horodnytsia	7	(3)
2017	Arsenal Kyiv	9	(0)
2018–2020	Minsk	72	(21)
2021	Gomel	24	(5)
2022	Lviv	13	(0)
2023–2024	Chornomorets Odesa	51	(3)
2025	Bukovyna Chernivtsi	3	(0)
2026–	Viktoriya Sumy	6	(2)

International career^{‡}
2011	Ukraine U17	9	(1)
2011–2012	Ukraine U18	14	(2)
2012	Ukraine U19	5	(0)
2015	Ukraine U21	1	(0)
- * Club domestic league appearances and goals as of 4 June 2026 ‡ National team caps and goals as of 22 February 2018

Oleksandr Vasylyev (Ukrainian: Олександр Андрійович Васильєв; born 27 April 1994) is a Ukrainian professional footballer who plays as a midfielder for Viktoriya Sumy.

== Career ==
Vasylyev is a product of the FC Dynamo Kyiv Youth Sportive School System. His first trainer was Vyacheslav Semenov.

He made his debut for FC Dnipro in the match against FC Shakhtar Donetsk on 23 May 2015 in the Ukrainian Premier League.

At the end of January 2023 Vasylyev joined Chornomorets Odesa. In March 2025, he joined ukrainian side Bukovyna Chernivtsi.
