= Maksym Komarets =

Ukrainian footballer

Personal information
- Full name: Maksym Leonidovych Komarets
- Date of birth: 23 May 2002 (age 24)
- Place of birth: Rava-Ruska, Ukraine
- Height: 1.72 m (5 ft 7 1/2 in)
- Position: Defender

Team information
- Current team: Lviv
- Number: 4

Youth career
- 2011–2015: Rava Rava-Ruska
- 2015–2020: Lviv

Senior career*
Years	Team	Apps	(Gls)
2020–	Lviv	4	(0)

International career^{‡}
2020	Ukraine U18	?	(?)
- * Club domestic league appearances and goals as of 10 May 2021 ‡ National team caps and goals as of 15 April 2021

Maksym Leonidovych Komarets (Ukrainian: Максим Леонідович Комарець; born 23 May 2002) is a professional Ukrainian football defender who plays for FC Lviv.

== Career ==
Born in Zhovkva Raion, Komarets is a product of the local Rava Rava-Ruska and FC Lviv youth sportive school systems.

He played for FC Lviv in the Ukrainian Premier League Reserves and in July 2020 Komarets was promoted to the senior squad of this team. He made his debut in the Ukrainian Premier League for FC Lviv as a start-squad player on 19 July 2020, playing in a lost home match against FC Mariupol.
