= Alexandru Vlad =

Romanian footballer

Personal information
- Full name: Alexandru Nicolae Vlad
- Date of birth: 6 December 1989 (age 36)
- Place of birth: Sighetu Marmației, Romania
- Height: 1.74 m (5 ft 9 in)
- Positions: Left-back; centre-back

Youth career
- –2004: CSM Sighetu Marmației
- 2004–2008: Ardealul Cluj

Senior career*
Years	Team	Apps	(Gls)
2008–2009	Internațional Curtea de Argeș	21	(0)
2009–2011	Săgeata Năvodari	57	(1)
2011–2013	Pandurii Târgu Jiu	57	(0)
2013–2017	Dnipro Dnipropetrovsk	37	(0)
2017–2018	CFR Cluj	3	(0)
2018–2023	Voluntari	118	(1)
Total		293	(2)

International career
2013	Romania	1	(0)
- * Club domestic league appearances and goals

Alexandru Nicolae Vlad (Romanian pronunciation: [alekˈsandru nikoˈla.e ˈvlad]; born 6 December 1989) is a Romanian former professional footballer who played as a left-back or a centre-back.

== Career ==
On 4 July 2013, Vlad signed a deal with Ukrainian team Dnipro Dnipropetrovsk for an undisclosed fee.

== Honours ==
Dnipro Dnipropetrovsk

- UEFA Europa League runner-up: 2014–15

CFR Cluj

- Liga I: 2017–18

Voluntari

- Cupa României runner-up: 2021–22
