= Volodymyr Polyovyi =

Ukrainian footballer

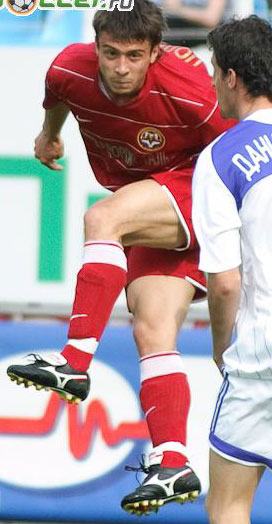
- Polyovyi in 2010

Personal information
- Full name: Volodymyr Oleksandrovych Polyovyi
- Date of birth: 28 July 1985 (age 41)
- Place of birth: Zaporizhzhia, Ukrainian SSR
- Height: 1.70 m (5 ft 7 in)
- Position: Defender

Team information
- Current team: Metalurh Zaporizhzhia
- Number: 14

Youth career
- 1998–2000: Metalurh Zaporizhzhia
- 2000–2001: Obukhiv

Senior career*
Years	Team	Apps	(Gls)
2001–2002	Borysfen-2 Boryspil	11	(0)
2002	Dynamo-3 Kyiv	2	(0)
2002–2003	Metalurh-2 Zaporizhzhia	42	(1)
2004–2011	Metalurh Zaporizhzhia	138	(2)
2011–2013	Arsenal Kyiv	55	(0)
2013–2014	Metalurh Donetsk	18	(2)
2014–2017	Dnipro Dnipropetrovsk	20	(0)
2015–2016	→ Volyn Lutsk (loan)	27	(1)
2017–2020	Dnipro-1	62	(4)
2020–2023	Metalurh Zaporizhzhia	54	(1)
2024–	Metalurh Zaporizhzhia	9	(0)

International career^{‡}
2001–2002	Ukraine U17	4	(0)
2010	Ukraine	5	(0)
- * Club domestic league appearances and goals as of 10 June 2025 ‡ National team caps and goals as of 3 September 2020

Volodymyr Oleksandrovych Polyovyi (Ukrainian: Володимир Олександрович Польовий; born 28 July 1985) is a Ukrainian former professional football plays who played as a defender for Metalurh Zaporizhzhia.
