= 2016–17 FC Chornomorets Odesa season =

FC Chornomorets Odesa
2016-17 season
- General Director: Serhii Kernytskyi
- Manager: Oleksandr Babych
- Stadium: Chornomorets Stadium
- Ukrainian Premier League: 6th
- Ukrainian Cup: Round of 20 (1/16)
- Top goalscorer: League: Dmytro Korkishko (7); All: Dmytro Korkishko (7)
| Home colours | Away colours |

The 2016–17 season was the 79th season in the club's history and the 26th season of Odesa football club "Chornomorets" in the domestic league/cup of Ukraine. "The Sailors" competed in Premier League and in the Ukrainian Cup.

== Players ==
=== Squad information ===
| Squad no. | Name | Nationality | Position | Date of birth (age) |
Goalkeepers
| 1 | Danylo Kanevtsev ^{List B} | (Ukraine) | GK | 26 July 1996 (aged 20) |
| 30 | Sergey Smorodin | (Uzbekistan) | GK | 15 February 1994 (aged 23) |
| 71 | Dmytro Bezruk | (Ukraine) | GK | 30 March 1996 (aged 21) |
Defenders
| 2 | Oleksandr Azatskyi | (Ukraine) | DF | 13 January 1994 (aged 23) |
| 3 | Rizvan Ablitarov | (Ukraine) | DF | 18 April 1989 (aged 28) |
| 5 | Davit Khocholava | (Georgia (country)) | DF | 2 August 1993 (aged 23) |
| 15 | Giorgi Gadrani | (Georgia (country)) | DF | 30 September 1994 (aged 22) |
| 19 | Oleksandr Kalitov | (Ukraine) | DF | 29 September 1993 (aged 23) |
| 25 | Yevhen Martynenko | (Ukraine) | DF | 25 June 1993 (aged 24) |
| 27 | Serhiy Lyulka (Captain) | (Ukraine) | DF | 22 February 1990 (aged 27) |
| 51 | Vladyslav Schetinin ^{List B} | (Ukraine) | DF | 29 August 1997 (aged 19) |
| 96 | Oleksandr Kapliyenko | (Ukraine) | DF | 9 March 1996 (aged 21) |
| | Artur Kuznetsov | (Ukraine) | DF | 9 March 1995 (aged 22) |
Midfielders
| 6 | Kyrylo Kovalets | (Ukraine) | MF | 2 July 1993 (aged 23) |
| 8 | Oleksandr Andriyevskyi (on loan from Dynamo Kyiv) | (Ukraine) | MF | 25 June 1994 (aged 23) |
| 10 | Artur Karnoza | (Ukraine) | MF | 2 August 1990 (aged 26) |
| 11 | Yevhen Smirnov | (Ukraine) | MF | 16 April 1993 (aged 24) |
| 17 | Mykyta Tatarkov | (Ukraine) | MF | 4 January 1995 (aged 22) |
| 20 | Oleksandr Mashnin | (Ukraine) | MF | 20 March 1993 (aged 24) |
| 70 | Mykhailo Popov ^{List B} | (Ukraine) | MF | 2 July 1996 (aged 20) |
| 75 | Maksym Tretyakov ^{List B} | (Ukraine) | MF | 6 March 1996 (aged 21) |
| 94 | Oleh Danchenko (on loan from Shakhtar Donetsk) | (Ukraine) | MF | 1 August 1994 (aged 22) |
| 99 | Mykola Musolitin ^{List B} | (Ukraine) | MF | 21 January 1999 (aged 18) |
Forwards
| 7 | Dmytro Korkishko | (Ukraine) | FW | 4 May 1990 (aged 27) |
| 9 | Oleksiy Khoblenko | (Ukraine) | FW | 4 April 1994 (aged 23) |
| 14 | Yevhen Murashov ^{List B} | (Ukraine) | FW | 9 May 1995 (aged 22) |
| 18 | Sílvio | (Brazil) | FW | 4 May 1994 (aged 23) |
| 21 | Petro Pereverza | (Ukraine) | FW | 10 July 1994 (aged 22) |
| 22 | Vladyslav Kabayev | (Ukraine) | FW | 1 September 1995 (aged 21) |
| 26 | Jorge Elias (on loan from Kapfenberger SV) | (Brazil) | FW | 6 June 1991 (aged 26) |
| 33 | Volodymyr Barilko | (Ukraine) | FW | 29 January 1994 (aged 23) |

== Transfers ==
=== In ===
| Date | Pos. | Player | Age | Moving from | Type | Fee | Source |
Summer
| 30 June 2016 | FW | (Ukraine) Volodymyr Barilko | 22 | (Ukraine) Metalist Kharkiv | Transfer | Free | |
| 30 June 2016 | FW | (Ukraine) Oleksiy Khoblenko | 22 | (Ukraine) Dynamo Kyiv | Transfer | Undisclosed | |
| 18 July 2016 | DF | (Ukraine) Serhiy Lyulka | 26 | (Czech Republic) Slovan Liberec | Transfer | Free | |
| 2 September 2016 | GK | (Ukraine) Danylo Kanevtsev | 20 | (Ukraine) Metalist Kharkiv | Transfer | Free | |
| 2 September 2016 | MF | (Nigeria) Sheriff Isa | 25 | Unattached | Transfer | Free | |
| 13 September 2016 | MF | (Ukraine) Maksym Tretyakov | 20 | (Ukraine) Dnipro | Transfer | Free | |
| 15 July 2016 | MF | (Ukraine) Oleksandr Andriyevskyi | 22 | (Ukraine) Dynamo Kyiv | Loan | | |
| 31 August 2016 | MF | (Ukraine) Andriy Korobenko | 19 | (Ukraine) Shakhtar Donetsk | Loan | | |
| 30 June 2016 | DF | (Ukraine) Andriy Slinkin | 25 | (Moldova) Zaria Bălți | Loan return | | |
| 30 June 2016 | FW | (Ukraine) Vadym Yavorskyi | 22 | (Ukraine) Hirnyk-Sport | Loan return | | |
| 30 June 2016 | FW | (Ukraine) Navid Nasimi | 21 | (Ukraine) Hirnyk-Sport | Loan return | | |
| 19 August 2016 | FW | (Ukraine) Vadym Yavorskyi | 22 | (Ukraine) Veres Rivne | Loan return | | |
| 21 August 2016 | FW | (Ukraine) Petro Pereverza | 22 | (Ukraine) Zhemchuzhyna Odesa | Loan return | | |
Winter
| 12 December 2016 | MF | (Ukraine) Oleksandr Kapliyenko | 20 | (Turkey) Alanyaspor | Transfer | Undisclosed | |
| 21 February 2017 | GK | (Uzbekistan) Sergey Smorodin | 23 | (Uzbekistan) Neftchi Fergana | Transfer | Undisclosed | |
| 21 February 2017 | DF | (Ukraine) Rizvan Ablitarov | 27 | (Ukraine) Obolon-Brovar Kyiv | Transfer | Undisclosed | |
| 21 February 2017 | MF | (Ukraine) Artur Karnoza | 26 | (Ukraine) Karpaty Lviv | Transfer | Free | |
| 21 February 2017 | MF | (Ukraine) Oleksandr Mashnin | 26 | (Ukraine) Real Pharma Odesa | Transfer | Undisclosed | |
| 10 February 2017 | FW | (Brazil) Jorge Elias | 25 | (Austria) Kapfenberger SV | Loan | | |

=== Out ===
| Date | Pos. | Player | Age | Moving to | Type | Fee | Source |
Summer
| 17 June 2016 | DF | (Ukraine) Andriy Slinkin | 25 | (Moldova) Dacia Chișinău | Transfer | Undisclosed | |
| 30 June 2016 | FW | (United States) Eugene Starikov | 27 | Unattached | Transfer | Free | |
| August 2016 | FW | (Ukraine) Navid Nasimi | 21 | (Ukraine) Arsenal Kyiv | Transfer | Undisclosed | |
| 18 July 2016 | FW | (Ukraine) Vadym Yavorskyi | 22 | (Ukraine) Veres Rivne | Loan | | |
| 18 July 2016 | FW | (Ukraine) Petro Pereverza | 22 | (Ukraine) Zhemchuzhyna Odesa | Loan | | |
| 23 August 2016 | FW | (Ukraine) Vadym Yavorskyi | 22 | (Ukraine) Hirnyk-Sport | Loan | | |
| 2 September 2016 | FW | (Ukraine) Yevhen Murashov | 21 | (Georgia (country)) Guria Lanchkhuti | Loan | | |
| 30 June 2016 | FW | (Ukraine) Volodymyr Barilko | 22 | (Ukraine) Metalist Kharkiv | Loan return | | |
| 30 June 2016 | FW | (Ukraine) Oleksiy Khoblenko | 22 | (Ukraine) Dynamo Kyiv | Loan return | | |
Winter
| 12 December 2016 | MF | (Ukraine) Valeriy Kutsenko | 30 | (Ukraine) MFC Mykolaiv | Transfer | Free | |
| 13 December 2016 | DF | (Brazil) Mateus Mendes | 24 | Unattached | Transfer | Free | |
| 15 December 2016 | MF | (Nigeria) Sheriff Isa | 25 | Unattached | Transfer | Free | |
| 11 January 2017 | GK | (Ukraine) Yevhen Borovyk | 31 | (Ukraine) Karpaty Lviv | Transfer | Free | |
| 11 January 2017 | MF | (Ukraine) Artem Filimonov | 22 | (Ukraine) Karpaty Lviv | Transfer | Free | |
| 19 January 2017 | MF | (Ukraine) Tomas Sereda | 19 | (Greece) Asteras Tripolis | Transfer | Free | |
| 1 January 2017 | MF | (Ukraine) Vladyslav Kalitvintsev | 23 | (Ukraine) Dynamo Kyiv | Loan return | | |
| 1 January 2017 | MF | (Ukraine) Andriy Korobenko | 19 | (Ukraine) Shakhtar Donetsk | Loan return | | |
| 3 March 2017 | DF | (Ukraine) Serhiy Petko | 23 | (Ukraine) Veres Rivne | Loan | | |

== Pre-season and friendlies ==
| 26 June 2016 Friendly | Chornomorets Odesa (Ukraine) | 0–1 | (Ukraine) Real Pharma Odesa | Odesa |
| 17:30 EEST (UTC+03:00) | | Report | Nahaba 32' | Stadium: Chornomorets Train Base; Referee: Ihor Horban |

| 26 June 2016 Friendly | Chornomorets Odesa (Ukraine) | 2–1 | (Ukraine) Real Pharma Odesa | Odesa |
| 19:00 EEST (UTC+03:00) | Kovalets 53', 83' | Report | Bondarenko 26' | Stadium: Chornomorets Train Base; Referee: Viktor Shevtsov |

| 30 June 2016 Friendly | Chornomorets Odesa (Ukraine) | 1–2 | (Ukraine) Zhemchuzhyna Odesa | Odesa |
| 12:00 EEST (UTC+03:00) | Yavorskyi 61' (pen.) | Report | Ushakov 22', 44' | Stadium: Chornomorets Train Base; Referee: Dmytro Bondarenko |

| 1 July 2016 Friendly | Sheriff Tiraspol (Moldova) | 1–0 | (Ukraine) Chornomorets Odesa | Tiraspol, Moldova |
| 19:00 EEST (UTC+03:00) | Ivanov 90' | Report | | Stadium: Malaya Sportivnaya Arena; Referee: Henadiy Sidenko |

| 5 July 2016 Friendly | Chornomorets Odesa (Ukraine) | 3–2 | (Moldova) Speranța Nisporeni | Odesa |
| 19:00 EEST (UTC+03:00) | Smirnov 7'; Azatskyi 26'; 85' | Report | Negru 70'; Pavlov 87' | Stadium: Chornomorets Stadium; Referee: Yevhen Petrenko |

| 9 July 2016 Friendly | Chornomorets Odesa (Ukraine) | 2–2 | (Ukraine) MFC Mykolaiv | Odesa |
| 17:00 EEST (UTC+03:00) | Gadrani 21'; 52' | Report | Hluschenko 71'; Sarkisyan 86' | Stadium: Chornomorets Train Base; Referee: Dmytro Bondarenko |

| 9 July 2016 Friendly | Chornomorets Odesa (Ukraine) | 1–1 | (Ukraine) MFC Mykolaiv | Odesa |
| 19:00 EEST (UTC+03:00) | Khoblenko 78' | Report | Morozov 90+1' | Stadium: Chornomorets Train Base; Attendance: 100; Referee: Ihor Horban |

| 4 September 2016 Friendly | Chornomorets Odesa (Ukraine) | 3–1 | (Moldova) Dacia Chișinău | Odesa |
| 17:00 EEST (UTC+03:00) | Kovalets 23'; Mateus 77'; Silvio 87' | Report | Feshchuk 73' (pen.) | Stadium: Chornomorets Train Base; Attendance: 300; Referee: Yevhen Petrenko |

| 12 November 2016 Friendly | Chornomorets Odesa (Ukraine) | 0–0 | (Moldova) Petrocub Hîncești | Odesa |
| 15:45 EEST (UTC+02:00) | | Report | | Stadium: Chornomorets Train Base; Referee: Oleksandr Derdo |

| 27 November 2016 Friendly | Chornomorets Odesa (Ukraine) | 6–3 | (Ukraine) Atletik Odesa | Odesa |
| | Musolitin 7', 53'; Khocholava 12'; Kabayev 16'; Kovalets 43'; Khoblenko 67' | Report | Yakimenko 27', 36'; Hrozov 64' | Stadium: Chornomorets Train Base |

| 21 January 2017 Friendly | Chornomorets Odesa (Ukraine) | 1–0 | (Ukraine) MFC Mykolaiv | Odesa |
| 13:00 EET (UTC+02:00) | Andriyevskyi 16' | Report | | Stadium: Chornomorets Train Base; Referee: Oleksandr Derdo |

| 25 January 2017 Friendly | Chornomorets Odesa (Ukraine) | 3–1 | (Ukraine) Zhemchuzhyna Odesa | Odesa |
| 12:00 EET (UTC+02:00) | Kovalets 17'; Musolitin 95'; 106' | Report | Horbovskyi 26' | Stadium: Chornomorets Train Base; Referee: Henadiy Serputko |

| 31 January 2017 Friendly | Neftochimic Burgas (Bulgaria) | 2–0 | (Ukraine) Chornomorets Odesa | Turkey |
| 10:30 EET (UTC+02:00) | Manev 63'; Ivanov 78' | Report |

| 31 January 2017 Friendly | Chornomorets Odesa (Ukraine) | 0–2 | (Poland) Jagiellonia Białystok | Belek, Turkey |
| 16:30 EET (UTC+02:00) | | Report | Świderski 12'; Černych 90+1' |

| 4 February 2017 Friendly | Chornomorets Odesa (Ukraine) | 0–3 | (Serbia) Napredak Kruševac | Belek, Turkey |
| 12:00 EET (UTC+02:00) | | Report | Miladinović 4'; Gobeljić 58'; Beljić 77' | Stadium: Riu Kaya training field |

| 4 February 2017 Friendly | Dinamo Tbilisi (Georgia (country)) | 1–2 | (Ukraine) Chornomorets Odesa | Belek, Turkey |
| 16:30 EET (UTC+02:00) | Gvelesiani 11' | Report | Khocholava 3'; Khoblenko 23' | Stadium: Riu Kaya training field |

| 9 February 2017 Friendly | Chornomorets Odesa (Ukraine) | 1–0 | (Kosovo) Feronikeli Glogovac | Belek, Turkey |
| 16:30 EET (UTC+02:00) | Kovalets 54' | Report |

| 12 February 2017 Friendly | Chornomorets Odesa (Ukraine) | 2–3 | (Turkmenistan) Şagadam | Belek, Turkey |
| 10:00 EET (UTC+02:00) | Popov 12'; Sílvio 26' | Report | Shermetov 8'; Hamrayev 19'; Boliyan 65' | Stadium: Riu Kaya training field |

| 12 February 2017 Friendly | BATE Borisov (Belarus) | 1–0 | (Ukraine) Chornomorets Odesa | Belek, Turkey |
| 16:00 EET (UTC+02:00) | Rios 90+1' | Report | | Stadium: Cornelia sports complex |

| 15 February 2017 Friendly | FC Atyrau (Kazakhstan) | 0–3 | (Ukraine) Chornomorets Odesa | Belek, Turkey |
| 16:30 EET (UTC+02:00) | | Report | Tretyakov 33', 51'; Musolitin 57' |

| 16 February 2017 Friendly | Chornomorets Odesa (Ukraine) | 2–1 | (Latvia) Spartaks Jūrmala | Belek, Turkey |
| 16:00 EET (UTC+02:00) | Azatskyi 14'; Kovalets 50' | Report | Kazačoks 90+1' (pen.) | Stadium: Riu Kaya training field Attendance: 50 |

| 27 February 2017 Friendly | Chornomorets Odesa (Ukraine) | 1–0 | (Ukraine) Zhemchuzhyna Odesa | Odesa |
| 12:00 EET (UTC+02:00) | Karnoza 72' | Report | | Stadium: Chornomorets Train Base; Referee: Henadiy Serputko |

| 25 March 2017 Friendly | Sheriff Tiraspol (Moldova) | 2–1 | (Ukraine) Chornomorets Odesa | Tiraspol, Moldova |
| 15:00 EET (UTC+02:00) | Ambros 12'; Kvržić 75' | Report | Korkishko 26' | Stadium: Malaya Sportivnaya Arena; Attendance: 50; Referee: Dmitriy Muntyan |

== Competitions ==
=== Overall ===
| Competition | Started round | Final position | First match | Last match |
|---|---|---|---|---|
| Premier League | Matchday 1 | 6th | 23 July 2016 | 31 May 2017 |
| Cup | Round of 20 | Round of 20 | 21 September 2016 | 21 September 2016 |

Last updated:

=== Premier League ===
==== League table ====
| Pos | Team | Pld | W | D | L | GF | GA | GD | Pts | Qualification or relegation |
|---|---|---|---|---|---|---|---|---|---|---|
| 1 | Shakhtar Donetsk (C) | 32 | 25 | 5 | 2 | 66 | 24 | +42 | 80 | Qualification for the Champions League group stage |
| 2 | Dynamo Kyiv | 32 | 21 | 4 | 7 | 69 | 33 | +36 | 67 | Qualification for the Champions League third qualifying round |
| 3 | Zorya Luhansk | 32 | 16 | 6 | 10 | 45 | 31 | +14 | 54 | Qualification for the Europa League group stage (Note: Since winners of 2016–17 Ukrainian Cup, Shakhtar Donetsk, qualified for European competition based on their league position, the spot awarded to the cup winner (Europa League group stage) was passed to the third-placed team and the spot for the third-placed team (Europa League third qualifying round) was passed to the fifth-placed team.) |
| 4 | Olimpik Donetsk | 32 | 11 | 11 | 10 | 33 | 44 | −11 | 44 | Qualification for the Europa League third qualifying round |
| 5 | FC Oleksandriya | 32 | 10 | 10 | 12 | 41 | 43 | −2 | 40 | Qualification for the Europa League third qualifying round |
| 6 | Chornomorets Odesa | 32 | 10 | 8 | 14 | 25 | 37 | −12 | 38 | |

Source: UEFA, Ukrainian Premier League, Soccerway
Rules for classification: 1) Points; 2) Goal difference; 3) Goals scored; 4) Head-to-head points; 5) Head-to-head goal difference; 6) Head-to-head goals scored; 7) Draw.
(C) Champions

==== Results summary ====
| Overall | | | | | | | | Home | | | | | | Away | | | | | |
| Pld | W | D | L | GF | GA | GD | Pts | W | D | L | GF | GA | GD | W | D | L | GF | GA | GD |
|---|---|---|---|---|---|---|---|---|---|---|---|---|---|---|---|---|---|---|---|
| 32 | 10 | 8 | 14 | 25 | 37 | −12 | 38 | 5 | 5 | 6 | 12 | 17 | −5 | 5 | 3 | 8 | 13 | 20 | −7 |

Last updated: 31 May 2017.
Source: Competitive matches

==== Results by round ====
| Round | 1 | 2 | 3 | 4 | 5 | 6 | 7 | 8 | 9 | 10 | 11 | 12 | 13 | 14 | 15 | 16 | 17 | 18 | 19 | 20 | 21 | 22 | 23 | 24 | 25 | 26 | 27 | 28 | 29 | 30 | 31 | 32 |
|---|---|---|---|---|---|---|---|---|---|---|---|---|---|---|---|---|---|---|---|---|---|---|---|---|---|---|---|---|---|---|---|---|
| Ground | A | H | A | H | A | A | H | A | H | A | H | H | A | H | A | H | H | A | H | A | H | A | H | A | H | A | H | A | H | A | H | A |
| Result | L | L | L | W | W | W | W | D | D | W | D | L | L | D | L | W | D | L | W | D | L | L | D | W | W | W | L | L | L | D | L | L |
| Position | 6 | 11 | 11 | 9 | 6 | 6 | 5 | 5 | 4 | 4 | 5 | 5 | 6 | 6 | 6 | 6 | 6 | 7 | 6 | 6 | 6 | 6 | 6 | 6 | 6 | 5 | 5 | 6 | 6 | 6 | 6 | 6 |

Updated to match(es) played on 31 May 2017. Source: Competitive matches
A = Away; H = Home; W = Win; D = Draw; L = Loss

==== Matches ====
| 23 July 2016 1 | Vorskla Poltava | 1–0 | Chornomorets Odesa | Poltava |
| 19:30 EEST (UTC+03:00) | Khlyobas 18'; Sklyar (yellow card) 55' | Report | Kutsenko (yellow card) 63'; Khocholava (yellow card) 77'; Korkishko (yellow card) 88' | Stadium: Vorskla Stadium; Attendance: 3,000; Referee: Serhiy Boyko |

| 30 July 2016 2 | Chornomorets Odesa | 1–4 | Shakhtar Donetsk | Odesa |
| 19:30 EEST (UTC+03:00) | Filimonov 61'; Andriyevskyi (yellow card) 87'; Khocholava (yellow card) 90+4' | Report | Seleznyov (yellow card) 32' (goal) 51'; Fred 59'; Rakitskiy (yellow card) 71'; Eduardo 90+1'; Kovalenko 90+2' | Stadium: Chornomorets Stadium; Attendance: 13,144; Referee: Yaroslav Kozyk |

| 7 August 2016 3 | Zorya Luhansk | 4–0 | Chornomorets Odesa | Zaporizhia |
| 19:30 EEST (UTC+03:00) | Karavayev 15', 30'; Petryak 22'; Checher (yellow card) 48'; Sivakow (yellow card) 71'; Chaykovskyi 73' | Report | Filimonov (yellow card) 11'; Azatskyi (yellow card) 34'; Khocholava (yellow card) 54'; Petko (yellow card) 79'; Kabayev (yellow card) 80'; Korkishko (yellow card) 90+2' | Stadium: Slavutych-Arena; Attendance: 1,300; Referee: Oleksandr Ivanov |

| 14 August 2016 4 | Chornomorets Odesa | 3–0 | Olimpik Donetsk | Odesa |
| 17:00 EEST (UTC+03:00) | Martynenko 17', 36', (yellow card) 90+1'; Filimonov (yellow card) 32'; Khoblenko (yellow card) 37'; Barilko 90+3' | Report | Petrov (yellow card) 86' | Stadium: Chornomorets Stadium; Attendance: 5,200; Referee: Ivan Bondar |

| 21 August 2016 5 | Zirka Kropyvnytskyi | 0–1 | Chornomorets Odesa | Kropyvnytskyi |
| 19:30 EEST (UTC+03:00) | Havrysh (yellow card) 81' | Report | Khocholava (yellow card) 3', (goal) 40'; Filimonov (yellow card) 41'; Martynenko (yellow card) 85'; Borovyk (yellow card) 90+3'; Tatarkov (yellow card) 90+4' | Stadium: Zirka Stadium; Attendance: 4,619; Referee: Anatoliy Zhabchenko |

| 27 August 2016 6 | Volyn Lutsk | 0–1 | Chornomorets Odesa | Lutsk |
| 17:00 EEST (UTC+03:00) | Romanyuk (yellow card) 37' (yellow-red card) 47' | Report | Smirnov (yellow card) 24'; Korkishko (yellow card) 33'; Tatarkov (yellow card) 66'; Kabayev 90+1' | Stadium: Avanhard Stadium; Attendance: 1,750; Referee: Ivan Bondar |

| 11 September 2016 7 | Chornomorets Odesa | 1–0 | FC Oleksandriya | Odesa |
| 17:00 EEST (UTC+03:00) | Khocholava (yellow card) 48'; Filimonov (yellow card) 56'; Hitchenko 57' (o.g.) | Report | Shendrik (yellow card) 50'; Mykytsey (yellow card) 82'; Hrytsuk (yellow card) 88' | Stadium: Chornomorets Stadium; Attendance: 6,022; Referee: Kateryna Monzul |

| 17 September 2016 8 | Karpaty Lviv | 0–0 | Chornomorets Odesa | Lviv |
| 17:00 EEST (UTC+03:00) | Kravets (yellow card) 60'; Verbnyi (yellow card) 71'; Kostevych (yellow card) 89'; Nesterov (yellow card) 89' | Report | Korkishko (yellow card) 35' | Stadium: Arena Lviv; Attendance: 2,858; Referee: Yaroslav Kozyk |

| 25 September 2016 9 | Chornomorets Odesa | 0–0 | Dnipro | Odesa |
| 19:30 EEST (UTC+03:00) | Filimonov (yellow card) 31'; Khoblenko (yellow card) 33' | Report | | Stadium: Chornomorets Stadium; Attendance: 7,100; Referee: Yuriy Mozharovsky |

| 1 October 2016 10 | Stal Kamianske | 1–2 | Chornomorets Odesa | Dnipro |
| 17:00 EEST (UTC+03:00) | Karikari 29', (yellow card) 37'; Zaderaka (yellow card) 58' | Report | Khocholava (yellow card) 11'; Filimonov (yellow card) 28'; Korkishko 34', (yellow card) 36'; Khoblenko 40'; Tatarkov (yellow card) 83' | Stadium: Meteor Stadium; Attendance: 550; Referee: Serhiy Boyko |

| 15 October 2016 11 | Chornomorets Odesa | 1–1 | Dynamo Kyiv | Odesa |
| 19:30 EEST (UTC+03:00) | Lyulka (yellow card) 22'; Korkishko (yellow card) 38'; Martynenko (yellow card) 53'; Filimonov (yellow card) 78'; Khacheridi 90+4' (o.g.) | Report | Khacheridi (yellow card) 30'; Moraes 30'; Sydorchuk (yellow card) 80' | Stadium: Chornomorets Stadium; Attendance: 9,102; Referee: Ihor Paskhal |

| 22 October 2016 12 | Chornomorets Odesa | 1–2 | Vorskla Poltava | Odesa |
| 19:30 EEST (UTC+03:00) | Khoblenko (yellow card) 6'; Smirnov (yellow card) 41'; Korkishko 48'; Andriyevskyi (yellow card) 79' | Report | Bartulović (yellow card) 39'; Kolomoyets 54', 80'; Holodyuk (yellow card) 81'; Nepohodov (yellow card) 90+1' | Stadium: Chornomorets Stadium; Attendance: 4,012; Referee: Dmytro Kutakov |

| 29 October 2016 13 | Shakhtar Donetsk | 2–0 | Chornomorets Odesa | Lviv |
| 17:00 EEST (UTC+03:00) | Bernard (yellow card) 13'; Ferreyra 24'; Dentinho 30'; Malyshev (yellow card) 79' | Report | Tatarkov (yellow card) 14'; Smirnov (yellow card) 44'; Lyulka (yellow card) 65'; Khocholava (yellow card) 66'; Musolitin (yellow card) 75'; Kabayev (yellow card) 90+1' | Stadium: Arena Lviv; Attendance: 1,948; Referee: Kostyantyn Trukhanov |

| 6 November 2016 14 | Chornomorets Odesa | 0–0 | Zorya Luhansk | Odesa |
| 17:00 EET (UTC+02:00) | Filimonov (yellow card) 15'; Martynenko (yellow card) 22'; Danchenko (yellow card) 33'; Smirnov (yellow card) 40' | Report | Kamenyuka (yellow card) 26'; Kulach (yellow card) 68'; Tkachuk (yellow card) 90+1' | Stadium: Chornomorets Stadium; Attendance: 3,840; Referee: Yuriy Mozharovsky |

| 19 November 2016 15 | Olimpik Donetsk | 1–0 | Chornomorets Odesa | Sumy |
| 14:00 EET (UTC+02:00) | Matyazh 21', (yellow card) 87'; Petrov (yellow card) 56' | Report | Korkishko (yellow card) 47'; Khocholava (yellow card) 56'; Danchenko (yellow card) 82' | Stadium: Yuvileiny Stadium; Attendance: 720; Referee: Anatoliy Abdula |

| 26 November 2016 16 | Chornomorets Odesa | 2–1 | Zirka Kropyvnytskyi | Odesa |
| 14:00 EET (UTC+02:00) | Filimonov (yellow card) 8'; Korkishko 25'; Danchenko (yellow card) 76'; Andriyevskyi 78'; Smirnov (yellow card) 90' | Report | Bilonoh 3'; Batsula (yellow card) 29'; Zahalskyi (yellow card) 37'; Sitalo (yellow card) 41'; Zubkov (yellow card) 77' (yellow-red card) 84' | Stadium: Chornomorets Stadium; Attendance: 3,100; Referee: Dmytro Kutakov |

| 3 December 2016 17 | Chornomorets Odesa | 0–0 | Volyn Lutsk | Odesa |
| 14:00 EET (UTC+02:00) | Khocholava (yellow card) 30'; Kalitvintsev (yellow card) 33' | Report | Melinyshyn (yellow card) 16'; Romanyuk (yellow card) 37'; Memeshev (yellow card) 73' | Stadium: Chornomorets Stadium; Attendance: 2,282; Referee: Kateryna Monzul |

| 11 December 2016 18 | FC Oleksandriya | 2–1 | Chornomorets Odesa | Oleksandriya |
| 17:00 EET (UTC+02:00) | Mykytsey 17', (yellow card) 21'; Chebotayev (yellow card) 40'; Kozak (yellow card) 65'; Leonov (yellow card) 68'; Hrytsuk 79'; Ponomar (yellow card) 83'; Hitchenko (yellow card) 85' (yellow-red card) 90'; Novak (yellow card) 90+2' | Report | Filimonov (yellow card) 16'; Kovalets 22', (yellow card) 56'; Andriyevskyi (yellow card) 32'; Khocholava (yellow card) 41'; Borovyk (yellow card) 71'; Kalitvintsev (yellow card) 78'; Khoblenko (yellow card) 90+3'; Martynenko (yellow card) 90+3'; Danchenko (red card) 90+3' | Stadium: CSC Nika Stadium; Attendance: 1,951; Referee: Yuriy Vaks |

| 25 February 2017 19 | Chornomorets Odesa | 1–0 | Karpaty Lviv | Odesa |
| 14:00 EET (UTC+02:00) | Korkishko (yellow card) 39'; Kapliyenko (yellow card) 67'; Smirnov 73'; Andriyevskyi (yellow card) 74' | Report | Filimonov (yellow card) 8'; Miroshnichenko (yellow card) 14'; Nesterov (yellow card) 43'; Klyots (yellow card) 59' | Stadium: Chornomorets Stadium; Attendance: 5,621; Referee: Vitaliy Romanov |

| 4 March 2017 20 | Dnipro | 1–1 | Chornomorets Odesa | Dnipro |
| 14:00 EET (UTC+02:00) | Dovbyk 14'; Svatok (yellow card) 30'; Rotan (yellow card) 83'; Kozhushko (yellow card) 84' | Report | Khocholava (yellow card) 32' (yellow-red card) 90+1'; Danchenko (yellow card) 45+2'; Khoblenko 75'; Karnoza (yellow card) 88' | Stadium: Dnipro-Arena; Attendance: 43; Referee: Anatoliy Zhabchenko |

| 11 March 2017 21 | Chornomorets Odesa | 0–1 | Stal Kamianske | Odesa |
| 14:00 EET (UTC+02:00) | Azatskyi (yellow card) 53'; Smirnov (yellow card) 54'; Korkishko (yellow card) 74'; Andriyevskyi (yellow card) 90+3' | Report | Vasin (yellow card) 20', (goal) 24'; Karasyuk (yellow card) 48' | Stadium: Chornomorets Stadium; Attendance: 3,863; Referee: Kostyantyn Trukhanov |

| 18 March 2017 22 | Dynamo Kyiv | 2–1 | Chornomorets Odesa | Kyiv |
| 19:00 EEST (UTC+03:00) | Yarmolenko 7', (yellow card) 90'; Sydorchuk 45'; Fedorchuk (yellow card) 88' | Report | Smirnov (yellow card) 65'; Khocholava 72', (yellow card) 75'; Korkishko (yellow card) 73' | Stadium: NSC Olimpiyskiy; Attendance: 7,046; Referee: Kateryna Monzul |

| 1 April 2017 23 | Chornomorets Odesa | 0–0 | Olimpik Donetsk | Odesa |
| 17:00 EEST (UTC+03:00) | Lyulka (yellow card) 19' | Report | Nyemchaninov (yellow card) 68' | Stadium: Chornomorets Stadium; Attendance: 4,152; Referee: Serhiy Berezka |

| 9 April 2017 24 | Shakhtar Donetsk | 1–2 | Chornomorets Odesa | Kharkiv |
| 17:00 EEST (UTC+03:00) | Bernard 27', (yellow card) 90+4'; Stepanenko (yellow card) 71'; Ferreyra (yellow card) 90+5' | Report | Khocholava (yellow card) 26'; Andriyevskyi 37', (yellow card) 76'; Khoblenko (yellow card) 39'; Sílvio (yellow card) 41'; Jorge Elias 68'; Kanevtsev (yellow card) 78'; Kovalets (yellow card) 90+4'; Mashnin (yellow card) 90+3' | Stadium: Metalist OSC; Attendance: 7,131; Referee: Yuriy Mozharovsky |

| 15 April 2017 25 | Chornomorets Odesa | 1–0 | FC Oleksandriya | Oleksandriya |
| 17:00 EEST (UTC+03:00) | Khoblenko (yellow card) 14' (yellow-red card) 90+3'; Kapliyenko (yellow card) 24'; Jorge Elias (yellow card) 51'; Andriyevskyi (yellow card) 53'; Korkishko 84', (yellow card) 84' | Report | Banada (yellow card) 40'; Leonov (yellow card) 46'; Ohirya (yellow card) 90+1' | Stadium: CSC Nika Stadium; Attendance: 3,228; Referee: Dmytro Kutakov |

| 23 April 2017 26 | Zorya Luhansk | 1–2 | Chornomorets Odesa | Zaporizhia |
| 19:30 EEST (UTC+03:00) | Hrechyshkin (yellow card) 18'; Rafael Forster 51' (pen.) | Report | Korkishko 15', 57' (pen.), (yellow card) 90+1'; Andriyevskyi (yellow card) 80' | Stadium: Slavutych-Arena; Attendance: 1,200; Referee: Anatoliy Abdula |

| 30 April 2017 27 | Chornomorets Odesa | 1–4 | Dynamo Kyiv | Kyiv |
| 19:30 EEST (UTC+03:00) | Kabayev (yellow card) 51'; Murashov (yellow card) 53'; Tatarkov 84' | Report | Yarmolenko 2', 80' (pen.), (yellow card) 17'; Besyedin (yellow card) 39', (goal) 40'; Vida 45' | Stadium: NSC Olimpiyskiy; Attendance: 5,431; Referee: Yuriy Mozharovsky |

| 6 May 2017 28 | Olimpik Donetsk | 1–0 | Chornomorets Odesa | Kyiv |
| 14:00EEST (UTC+03:00) | Illoy-Ayyet (yellow card) 6'; Brikner 16'; Hryn (yellow card) 48'; Bohdanov (yellow card) 55'; Serhiychuk (yellow card) 62'; Khomutov (yellow card) 85'; Oliynyk (yellow card) 90+3' | Report | Khocholava (yellow card) 9' (yellow-red card) 80'; Barilko (yellow card) 20'; Azatskyi (yellow card) 73' | Stadium: Dynamo Stadium; Attendance: 753; Referee: Yaroslav Kozyk |

| 13 May 2017 29 | Chornomorets Odesa | 0–3 | Shakhtar Donetsk | Odesa |
| 19:30 EEST (UTC+03:00) | | Report | Ablitarov 29' (o.g.); Blanco Leschuk 37', 89'; Kobin (yellow card) 80' | Stadium: Chornomorets Stadium; Attendance: 9,658; Referee: Mykola Kryvonosov |

| 21 May 2017 30 | FC Oleksandriya | 1–1 | Chornomorets Odesa | Oleksandriya |
| 19:30 EEST (UTC+03:00) | Zaporozhan (yellow card) 54'; Hitchenko (yellow card) 71'; Hrytsuk 76' (pen.) | Report | Kapliyenko (yellow card) 18' (yellow-red card) 25'; Korkishko 73'; Lyulka (yellow card) 76' | Stadium: CSC Nika Stadium; Attendance: 3,280; Referee: Anatoliy Abdula |

| 26 May 2017 31 | Chornomorets Odesa | 0–1 | Zorya Luhansk | Odesa |
| 19:00 EEST (UTC+03:00) | Kovalets (yellow card) 27' (yellow-red card) 43'; Andriyevskyi (yellow card) 64'; Korkishko (yellow card) 66'; Tretyakov (yellow card) 84' | Report | Paulinho 1'; Kharatin (yellow card) 24'; Bonaventure (yellow card) 43'; Opanasenko (yellow card) 60'; Checher (yellow card) 62' | Stadium: Chornomorets Stadium; Attendance: 4,700; Referee: Yuriy Mozharovsky |

| 31 May 2017 32 | Dynamo Kyiv | 2–1 | Chornomorets Odesa | Odesa |
| 19:00 EEST (UTC+03:00) | González 29'; Shepelyev (yellow card) 32'; Yarmolenko 64'; Burda (yellow card) 66'; Morozyuk (yellow card) 81' | Report | Khocholava (yellow card) 33'; Andriyevskyi 53' (pen.), (yellow card) 55'; Musolitin (yellow card) 84'; Danchenko (yellow card) 90' | Stadium: Chornomorets Stadium; Attendance: 6,123; Referee: Yaroslav Kozyk |

=== Ukrainian Cup ===
| 21 September 2016 Round of 20 (1/16) | Naftovyk-Ukrnafta Okhtyrka | 2–0 | Chornomorets Odesa | Okhtyrka |
| 18:00 EEST (UTC+03:00) | Cherniy 29'; Pidnebennoi (yellow card) 34'; Vechtomov (yellow card) 64'; Lozovyi 86'; Peredystyi (yellow card) 90+5' | Report | Petko (yellow card) 38'; Gadrani (yellow card) 60'; Kabayev (yellow card) 81'; Musolitin (yellow card) 90+4' | Stadium: Naftovyk Stadium; Attendance: 3,100; Referee: Vitaliy Romanov |

== Statistics ==
=== Appearances and goals ===
| No. | Pos | Nat | Player | Total | | Premier League | | Cup | |
| No. | Pos | Nat | Player | Apps | Goals | Apps | Goals | Apps | Goals |
Goalkeepers
| 1 | GK | (Ukraine) UKR | Danylo Kanevtsev | 8 | 0 | 8 | 0 | 0 | 0 |
| 71 | GK | (Ukraine) UKR | Dmytro Bezruk | 8 | 0 | 7 | 0 | 1 | 0 |
Defenders
| 2 | DF | (Ukraine) UKR | Oleksandr Azatskyi | 24 | 0 | 21+2 | 0 | 1 | 0 |
| 3 | DF | (Ukraine) UKR | Rizvan Ablitarov | 12 | 0 | 12 | 0 | 0 | 0 |
| 5 | DF | (Georgia (country)) GEO | Davit Khocholava | 24 | 2 | 24 | 2 | 0 | 0 |
| 15 | DF | (Georgia (country)) GEO | Giorgi Gadrani | 1 | 0 | 0 | 0 | 1 | 0 |
| 25 | DF | (Ukraine) UKR | Yevhen Martynenko | 16 | 2 | 16 | 2 | 0 | 0 |
| 27 | DF | (Ukraine) UKR | Serhiy Lyulka | 25 | 0 | 25 | 0 | 0 | 0 |
| 96 | DF | (Ukraine) UKR | Oleksandr Kapliyenko | 9 | 0 | 8+1 | 0 | 0 | 0 |
Midfielders
| 6 | MF | (Ukraine) UKR | Kyrylo Kovalets | 27 | 1 | 17+10 | 1 | 0 | 0 |
| 8 | MF | (Ukraine) UKR | Oleksandr Andriyevskyi | 25 | 3 | 19+5 | 3 | 1 | 0 |
| 10 | MF | (Ukraine) UKR | Artur Karnoza | 4 | 0 | 0+4 | 0 | 0 | 0 |
| 11 | MF | (Ukraine) UKR | Yevhen Smirnov | 20 | 1 | 20 | 1 | 0 | 0 |
| 17 | MF | (Ukraine) UKR | Mykyta Tatarkov | 21 | 1 | 17+4 | 1 | 0 | 0 |
| 20 | MF | (Ukraine) UKR | Oleksandr Mashnin | 6 | 0 | 0+5 | 0 | 0+1 | 0 |
| 70 | MF | (Ukraine) UKR | Mykhailo Popov | 1 | 0 | 0+1 | 0 | 0 | 0 |
| 75 | MF | (Ukraine) UKR | Maksym Tretyakov | 21 | 0 | 11+9 | 0 | 1 | 0 |
| 94 | MF | (Ukraine) UKR | Oleh Danchenko | 24 | 0 | 22+2 | 0 | 0 | 0 |
| 99 | MF | (Ukraine) UKR | Mykola Musolitin | 13 | 0 | 3+9 | 0 | 0+1 | 0 |
Forwards
| 7 | FW | (Ukraine) UKR | Dmytro Korkishko | 27 | 7 | 24+3 | 7 | 0 | 0 |
| 9 | FW | (Ukraine) UKR | Oleksiy Khoblenko | 27 | 2 | 22+5 | 2 | 0 | 0 |
| 14 | FW | (Ukraine) UKR | Yevhen Murashov | 1 | 0 | 0+1 | 0 | 0 | 0 |
| 18 | FW | (Brazil) BRA | Silvio | 8 | 0 | 2+5 | 0 | 0+1 | 0 |
| 22 | FW | (Ukraine) UKR | Vladyslav Kabayev | 26 | 1 | 16+9 | 1 | 1 | 0 |
| 26 | FW | (Brazil) BRA | Jorge Elias | 8 | 1 | 3+5 | 1 | 0 | 0 |
| 33 | FW | (Ukraine) UKR | Volodymyr Barilko | 18 | 1 | 8+9 | 1 | 1 | 0 |
Players transferred out during the season
| 10 | MF | (Ukraine) UKR | Vladyslav Kalitvintsev | 12 | 0 | 9+3 | 0 | 0 | 0 |
| 12 | GK | (Ukraine) UKR | Yevhen Borovyk | 17 | 0 | 17 | 0 | 0 | 0 |
| 16 | MF | (Ukraine) UKR | Artem Filimonov | 16 | 1 | 16 | 1 | 0 | 0 |
| 20 | MF | (Ukraine) UKR | Valeriy Kutsenko | 4 | 0 | 2+1 | 0 | 1 | 0 |
| 23 | MF | (Nigeria) NGA | Sheriff Isa | 2 | 0 | 0+1 | 0 | 1 | 0 |
| 32 | DF | (Ukraine) UKR | Serhiy Petko | 5 | 0 | 4 | 0 | 1 | 0 |
| 61 | DF | (Brazil) BRA | Mateus | 1 | 0 | 0 | 0 | 1 | 0 |

Source: Competitions

Last updated: 31 May 2017

=== Goalscorers ===
| Rank | No. | Pos | Nat | Name | Premier League | Cup | Total |
|---|---|---|---|---|---|---|---|
| 1 | 7 | FW | (Ukraine) | Dmytro Korkishko | 7 | 0 | 7 |
| 2 | 8 | MF | (Ukraine) | Oleksandr Andriyevskyi | 3 | 0 | 3 |
| 3 | 5 | DF | (Georgia (country)) | Davit Khocholava | 2 | 0 | 2 |
| 3 | 9 | FW | (Ukraine) | Oleksiy Khoblenko | 2 | 0 | 2 |
| 3 | 25 | DF | (Ukraine) | Yevhen Martynenko | 2 | 0 | 2 |
| 6 | 6 | MF | (Ukraine) | Kyrylo Kovalets | 1 | 0 | 1 |
| 6 | 11 | MF | (Ukraine) | Yevhen Smirnov | 1 | 0 | 1 |
| 6 | 16 | MF | (Ukraine) | Artem Filimonov | 1 | 0 | 1 |
| 6 | 17 | MF | (Ukraine) | Mykyta Tatarkov | 1 | 0 | 1 |
| 6 | 22 | FW | (Ukraine) | Vladyslav Kabayev | 1 | 0 | 1 |
| 6 | 26 | FW | (Brazil) | Jorge Elias | 1 | 0 | 1 |
| 6 | 33 | FW | (Ukraine) | Volodymyr Barilko | 1 | 0 | 1 |
| | | | | Own goal | 2 | 0 | 2 |

Last updated: 31 May 2017

=== Clean sheets ===
| Rank | No. | Pos | Nat | Name | Premier League | Cup | Total |
|---|---|---|---|---|---|---|---|
| 1 | 12 | GK | (Ukraine) | Yevhen Borovyk | 8 | 0 | 8 |
| 2 | 1 | GK | (Ukraine) | Danylo Kanevtsev | 2 | 0 | 2 |
| 3 | 71 | GK | (Ukraine) | Dmytro Bezruk | 1 | 0 | 1 |

Last updated: 16 April 2017

=== Disciplinary record ===
| No. | Pos | Nat | Player | Premier League | | | Cup | | | Total | | |
| No. | Pos | Nat | Player | Booked | (yellow card) (yellow-red card) | Sent off (straight red) | Booked | (yellow card) (yellow-red card) | Sent off (straight red) | Booked | (yellow card) (yellow-red card) | Sent off (straight red) |
| 1 | GK | (Ukraine) | Danylo Kanevtsev | 1 | 0 | 0 | 0 | 0 | 0 | 1 | 0 | 0 |
| 2 | DF | (Ukraine) | Oleksandr Azatskyi | 3 | 0 | 0 | 0 | 0 | 0 | 3 | 0 | 0 |
| 5 | DF | (Georgia (country)) | Davit Khocholava | 13 | 2 | 0 | 0 | 0 | 0 | 13 | 2 | 0 |
| 6 | MF | (Ukraine) | Kyrylo Kovalets | 2 | 1 | 0 | 0 | 0 | 0 | 2 | 1 | 0 |
| 7 | FW | (Ukraine) | Dmytro Korkishko | 13 | 0 | 0 | 0 | 0 | 0 | 13 | 0 | 0 |
| 8 | MF | (Ukraine) | Oleksandr Andriyevskyi | 10 | 0 | 0 | 0 | 0 | 0 | 10 | 0 | 0 |
| 9 | FW | (Ukraine) | Oleksiy Khoblenko | 5 | 1 | 0 | 0 | 0 | 0 | 5 | 1 | 0 |
| 10 | MF | (Ukraine) | Vladyslav Kalitvintsev | 2 | 0 | 0 | 0 | 0 | 0 | 2 | 0 | 0 |
| 10 | MF | (Ukraine) | Artur Karnoza | 1 | 0 | 0 | 0 | 0 | 0 | 1 | 0 | 0 |
| 11 | MF | (Ukraine) | Yevhen Smirnov | 7 | 0 | 0 | 0 | 0 | 0 | 7 | 0 | 0 |
| 12 | GK | (Ukraine) | Yevhen Borovyk | 2 | 0 | 0 | 0 | 0 | 0 | 2 | 0 | 0 |
| 14 | FW | (Ukraine) | Yevhen Murashov | 1 | 0 | 0 | 0 | 0 | 0 | 1 | 0 | 0 |
| 15 | DF | (Georgia (country)) | Giorgi Gadrani | 0 | 0 | 0 | 1 | 0 | 0 | 1 | 0 | 0 |
| 16 | MF | (Ukraine) | Artem Filimonov | 10 | 0 | 0 | 0 | 0 | 0 | 10 | 0 | 0 |
| 17 | MF | (Ukraine) | Mykyta Tatarkov | 3 | 0 | 0 | 0 | 0 | 0 | 3 | 0 | 0 |
| 18 | FW | (Brazil) | Sílvio | 1 | 0 | 0 | 0 | 0 | 0 | 1 | 0 | 0 |
| 20 | MF | (Ukraine) | Oleksandr Mashnin | 1 | 0 | 0 | 0 | 0 | 0 | 1 | 0 | 0 |
| 22 | FW | (Ukraine) | Vladyslav Kabayev | 4 | 0 | 0 | 0 | 0 | 0 | 4 | 0 | 0 |
| 25 | DF | (Ukraine) | Yevhen Martynenko | 5 | 0 | 0 | 0 | 0 | 0 | 5 | 0 | 0 |
| 26 | FW | (Brazil) | Jorge Elias | 1 | 0 | 0 | 0 | 0 | 0 | 1 | 0 | 0 |
| 27 | DF | (Ukraine) | Serhiy Lyulka | 4 | 0 | 0 | 0 | 0 | 0 | 4 | 0 | 0 |
| 32 | DF | (Ukraine) | Serhiy Petko | 1 | 0 | 0 | 1 | 0 | 0 | 2 | 0 | 0 |
| 33 | FW | (Ukraine) | Volodymyr Barilko | 1 | 0 | 0 | 0 | 0 | 0 | 1 | 0 | 0 |
| 75 | MF | (Ukraine) | Maksym Tretyakov | 2 | 0 | 0 | 0 | 0 | 0 | 2 | 0 | 0 |
| 94 | MF | (Ukraine) | Oleh Danchenko | 5 | 0 | 1 | 0 | 0 | 0 | 5 | 0 | 1 |
| 96 | DF | (Ukraine) | Oleksandr Kapliyenko | 2 | 1 | 0 | 0 | 0 | 0 | 2 | 1 | 0 |
| 99 | MF | (Ukraine) | Mykola Musolitin | 2 | 0 | 0 | 1 | 0 | 0 | 3 | 0 | 0 |

Last updated: 31 May 2017
