= List of Ukrainian football transfers winter 2016–17 =

This is a list of Ukrainian football transfers winter 2016-17. only clubs in 2016–17 Ukrainian Premier League are included.

FC Dnipro and FC Volyn Lutsk are banned for signing a new football players.

° denotes unconfirmed transfers.

== Ukrainian Premier League ==
=== Chornomorets Odesa ===
In:

No.	Pos.	Nation	Player
—	GK	UZB	Sergey Smorodin (from (Uzbekistan) Neftchi Fergana)
—	DF	UKR	Oleksandr Kapliyenko (from (Turkey) Alanyaspor)
—	DF	UKR	Rizvan Ablitarov (from (Ukraine) Obolon-Brovar)
—	MF	UKR	Artur Karnoza (from (Ukraine) Karpaty Lviv)
—	MF	UKR	Oleksandr Mashnin (from (Ukraine) Real Pharma)
—	FW	BRA	Jorge Elias (on loan from (Austria) Kapfenberger SV)

Out:

No.	Pos.	Nation	Player
—	GK	UKR	Yevhen Borovyk (to (Ukraine) Karpaty Lviv)
—	GK	UKR	Ivan Tyurin
—	DF	BRA	Mateus
—	DF	UKR	Serhiy Petko (on loan to (Ukraine) Veres Rivne)
—	MF	UKR	Vladyslav Kalitvintsev (loan return to (Ukraine) Dynamo Kyiv)
—	MF	UKR	Valeriy Kutsenko (to (Ukraine) MFC Mykolaiv)
—	MF	UKR	Tomas Sereda (to (Greece) Asteras Tripolis)
—	MF	NGA	Sheriff Isa
—	MF	UKR	Artem Filimonov (to (Ukraine) Karpaty Lviv)

=== Dnipro ===
In:

No.	Pos.	Nation	Player

Out:

No.	Pos.	Nation	Player
—	GK	UKR	Ihor Vartsaba
—	DF	BRA	Anderson Pico
—	DF	UKR	Oleksiy Larin (to (Bulgaria) Dunav Ruse)
—	MF	UKR	Serhiy Nazarenko (retired)
—	MF	UKR	Serhiy Politylo (to (Kazakhstan) Okzhetpes)
—	MF	UKR	Oleksandr Vasylyev
—	MF	UKR	Andriy Bliznichenko (to (Turkey) Karabükspor)
—	MF	UKR	Valeriy Luchkevych (to (Belgium) Standard Liège)
—	FW	UKR	Yevhen Bokhashvili (to (Ukraine) Rukh Vynnyky)

=== Dynamo Kyiv ===
In:

No.	Pos.	Nation	Player
—	DF	SRB	Aleksandar Pantić (from (Spain) Villarreal)
—	DF	HUN	Tamás Kádár (from (Poland) Lech Poznań)
—	MF	UKR	Vladyslav Kalitvintsev (loan return from (Ukraine) Chornomorets)
—	MF	UKR	Vitaliy Hemeha (loan return from (Poland) Wisła Płock)
—	FW	COL	Andrés Ramiro Escobar (loan return from (Colombia) Millonarios F.C.)
—	FW	UKR	Roman Yaremchuk (loan return from (Ukraine) FC Oleksandriya)
—	FW	POL	Łukasz Teodorczyk (loan return from (Belgium) Anderlecht)

Out:

No.	Pos.	Nation	Player
—	GK	UKR	Oleksandr Shovkovskyi (retired)
—	GK	UKR	Oleksandr Rybka (to (Turkey) Karabükspor)
—	DF	UKR	Yevhen Selin (to (Greece) Asteras Tripolis)
—	DF	UKR	Yevhen Makarenko
—	DF	BRA	Danilo Silva (to (Brazil) Internacional)
—	MF	UKR	Oleh Husyev
—	MF	UKR	Vitaliy Hemeha (to (Ukraine) Olimpik Donetsk)
—	MF	UKR	Renat Mochulyak (to (Greece) Platanias)
—	MF	UKR	Serhiy Myakushko (on loan to (Ukraine) Vorskla Poltava)
—	MF	UKR	Vladyslav Kalitvintsev (on loan to (Ukraine) Zorya Luhansk)
—	MF	UKR	Oleksiy Khakhlyov (to (Spain) Deportivo Alavés)
—	MF	UKR	Artem Hromov (to (Russia) Krylia Sovetov)
—	FW	NGA	Lukman Haruna
—	FW	UKR	Mykhaylo Udod (to (Ukraine) Vorskla Poltava)
—	FW	COL	Andrés Ramiro Escobar (on loan to (Brazil) Vasco da Gama)
—	FW	BRA	Júnior Moraes (on loan to (China) Tianjin Quanjian)
—	FW	UKR	Oleksandr Hladkyi (on loan to (Ukraine) Karpaty Lviv)
—	FW	POL	Łukasz Teodorczyk (to (Belgium) Anderlecht)

=== Karpaty Lviv ===
In:

No.	Pos.	Nation	Player
—	GK	UKR	Yevhen Borovyk (from (Ukraine) Chornomorets)
—	DF	UKR	Oleksiy Dytyatev (from (Ukraine) Vorskla Poltava)
—	DF	ARG	Cristian Paz (on loan from (Argentina) Temperley)
—	DF	UKR	Mykola Matviyenko (on loan from (Ukraine) Shakhtar Donetsk)
—	MF	UKR	Artem Filimonov (from (Ukraine) Chornomorets)
—	MF	UKR	Oleh Holodyuk (from (Ukraine) Vorskla Poltava)
—	FW	UKR	Viktor Khomchenko (from (Ukraine) Volyn Lutsk)
—	FW	UKR	Oleksiy Hutsulyak (loan return from (Spain) Villarreal)
—	FW	BRA	China (free agent)
—	FW	UKR	Oleksandr Hladkyy (on loan from (Ukraine) Dynamo Kyiv)

Out:

No.	Pos.	Nation	Player
—	GK	UKR	Oleh Mozil (on loan to (Ukraine) Bukovyna Chernivtsi)
—	DF	UKR	Artur Novotryasov (to (Ukraine) Illichivets Mariupol)
—	DF	UKR	Volodymyr Kostevych (to (Poland) Lech Poznań)
—	DF	UKR	Vasyl Kravets (on loan to (Spain) CD Lugo)
—	DF	UKR	Andriy Markovych (on loan to (Belarus) Naftan Novopolotsk)
—	MF	UKR	Serhiy Rudyka (to (Ukraine) Illichivets Mariupol)
—	MF	UKR	Artur Karnoza (to (Ukraine) Chornomorets)
—	MF	UKR	Kostyantyn Yaroshenko (to (Ukraine) Illichivets Mariupol)
—	MF	UKR	Yevhen Chumak (to (Belarus) Dnepr Mogilev)
—	MF	UKR	Vadym Strashkevych (to (Ukraine) Veres Rivne)
—	MF	UKR	Volodymyr Savoshko (to (Ukraine) Rukh Vynnyky)
—	FW	NGA	Gabriel Okechukwu
—	FW	ARM	Gegham Kadymyan (to (Ukraine) Zorya Luhansk)
—	FW	UKR	Yuriy Zakharkiv (to (Ukraine) Ternopil)
—	FW	ARG	Gustavo Blanco Leschuk (to (Ukraine) Shakhtar)

=== Oleksandriya ===
In:

No.	Pos.	Nation	Player
—	GK	UKR	Andriy Bubentsov (on loan from (Ukraine) Shakhtar)
—	DF	UKR	Valeriy Bondarenko (from (Ukraine) Skala Stryi)
—	DF	UKR	Serhiy Siminin (from (Ukraine) Vorskla Poltava)
—	MF	GEO	Vakhtang Chanturishvili (from (Georgia (country)) Dinamo Tbilisi)
—	FW	UKR	Volodymyr Pryyomov (from (Iran) Persepolis)

Out:

No.	Pos.	Nation	Player
—	DF	UKR	Maksym Zhychykov (loan return to (Ukraine) Shakhtar)
—	DF	UKR	Oleksandr Matvyeyev (to (Ukraine) Kolos Kovalivka)
—	DF	UKR	Stanislav Mykytsey (disqualified)
—	MF	UKR	Bohdan Borovskyi (on loan to (Ukraine) Inhulets Petrove)
—	FW	UKR	Roman Yaremchuk (loan return to (Ukraine) Dynamo Kyiv)

=== Olimpik Donetsk ===
In:

No.	Pos.	Nation	Player
—	MF	UKR	Yehor Demchenko (free agent)
—	MF	UKR	Ivan Brikner (from (Ukraine) PFC Sumy)
—	MF	UKR	Vitaliy Hemeha (from (Ukraine) Dynamo Kyiv)
—	MF	UKR	Ihor Zhurakhovskyi (from (Russia) Kuban Krasnodar)
—	FW	MAR	Moha Rharsalla (loan return from (Spain) Gimnàstic)
—	FW	UKR	Mykhaylo Serhiychuk (from (Ukraine) Veres Rivne)

Out:

No.	Pos.	Nation	Player
—	DF	UKR	Artem Baranovskyi (to (Tajikistan) Istiklol)
—	DF	UKR	Oleksandr Varvanin (to (Belarus) Krumkachy Minsk)
—	MF	UKR	Kyrylo Petrov (to (Azerbaijan) Neftçi)
—	MF	UKR	Yehor Demchenko (to (Ukraine) Avanhard Kramatorsk)
—	MF	UKR	Maksym Drachenko (to (Ukraine) Zirka)
—	MF	UKR	Volodymyr Tanchyk (to (Hungary) Gyirmót)
—	FW	UKR	Volodymyr Lysenko (to (Ukraine) Desna Chernihiv)
—	FW	UKR	Illya Kornyev

=== Shakhtar Donetsk ===
In:

No.	Pos.	Nation	Player
—	DF	UKR	Maksym Zhychykov (loan return from (Ukraine) FC Oleksandriya)
—	DF	UKR	Mykhaylo Pysko (loan return from (Ukraine) Illichivets Mariupol)
—	MF	BRA	Alan Patrick (loan return from (Brazil) Flamengo)
—	MF	UKR	Illya Shevtsov (from (Ukraine) Krystal Kherson)
—	MF	UKR	Oleksandr Karavayev (loan return from (Ukraine) Zorya Luhansk)
—	MF	UKR	Vyacheslav Churko (loan return from (Italy) Frosinone)
—	FW	UKR	Valeriy Hryshyn (loan return from (Ukraine) Avanhard Kramatorsk)
—	FW	ARG	Gustavo Blanco Leschuk (from (Ukraine) Karpaty Lviv)

Out:

No.	Pos.	Nation	Player
—	GK	UKR	Andriy Bubentsov (on loan to (Ukraine) Oleksandriya)
—	DF	UKR	Vyacheslav Shevchuk (retired)
—	DF	UKR	Maksym Zhychykov (on loan to (Ukraine) Illichivets Mariupol)
—	DF	UKR	Mykhaylo Pysko (on loan to (Belarus) Gomel)
—	DF	UKR	Mykola Matviyenko (on loan to (Ukraine) Karpaty Lviv)
—	DF	UKR	Oleksandr Volovyk (to (Kazakhstan) Aktobe)
—	MF	BRA	Wellington Nem (on loan to (Brazil) São Paulo)
—	MF	UKR	Oleksandr Karavayev (on loan to (Turkey) Fenerbahçe)
—	MF	UKR	Oleksandr Mihunov (on loan to (Ukraine) Illichivets Mariupol)
—	FW	UKR	Yevhen Seleznyov (to (Turkey) Karabükspor)
—	FW	CRO	Eduardo (to (Brazil) Atlético Paranaense)

=== Stal Kamianske ===
In:

No.	Pos.	Nation	Player
—	DF	UKR	Artem Shabanov (from (Ukraine) Volyn Lutsk)
—	MF	BRA	Leandro da Silva (free agent)

Out:

No.	Pos.	Nation	Player
—	MF	UKR	Artem Yesaulov (to (Azerbaijan) Shamkir FC)
—	MF	ARU	Erixon Danso (to (Norway) FK Jerv)
—	FW	NED	Sylvano Comvalius (to (Indonesia) Bali United)

=== Volyn Lutsk ===
In:

No.	Pos.	Nation	Player

Out:

No.	Pos.	Nation	Player
—	DF	UKR	Artem Shabanov (to (Ukraine) Stal Kamianske)
—	FW	UKR	Viktor Khomchenko (to (Ukraine) Karpaty Lviv)

=== Vorskla Poltava ===
In:

No.	Pos.	Nation	Player
—	GK	UKR	Bohdan Sarnavskyi (from (Russia) Ufa)
—	DF	UKR	Roman Kunyev (from (Ukraine) Kremin Kremenchuk)
—	DF	UKR	Oleksandr Chyzhov (from (Kazakhstan) Okzhetpes)
—	MF	UKR	Serhiy Myakushko (on loan from (Ukraine) Dynamo Kyiv)
—	MF	UKR	Vyacheslav Sharpar (from (Kazakhstan) Atyrau)
—	FW	UKR	Yevhen Budnik (loan return from (Belarus) Dinamo Minsk)
—	FW	UKR	Mykhaylo Udod (from (Ukraine) Dynamo Kyiv)
—	FW	UKR	Oleh Barannik (loan return from (Ukraine) Hirnyk-Sport)

Out:

No.	Pos.	Nation	Player
—	GK	UKR	Dmytro Nepohodov (to (Kazakhstan) Tobol)
—	GK	UKR	Vadym Shevchuk (to (Greece) Platanias)
—	GK	UKR	Oleksandr Tkachenko (on loan to (Ukraine) Hirnyk-Sport)
—	DF	UKR	Serhiy Siminin (to (Ukraine) Oleksandriya)
—	DF	UKR	Andriy Pylyavskyi (loan return to (Russia) Rubin Kazan)
—	DF	UKR	Oleksiy Dytyatev (to (Ukraine) Karpaty Lviv)
—	MF	UKR	Petro Namuilyk
—	MF	UZB	Sanzhar Tursunov (to (Qatar) Al Kharaitiyat SC)
—	MF	CRO	Mladen Bartulović (to (Poland) Miedź Legnica)
—	MF	GEO	Aleksandre Kobakhidze (to (Turkey) Göztepe S.K.)
—	MF	UKR	Oleh Holodyuk (to (Ukraine) Karpaty Lviv)
—	FW	UKR	Yuriy Kolomoyets (to (Hungary) MTK Budapest)
—	FW	UKR	Yevhen Budnik (to (Austria) Kapfenberger SV)

=== Zirka Kropyvnytskyi ===
In:

No.	Pos.	Nation	Player
—	DF	BRA	Nailson (on loan from (Portugal) Famalicão)
—	MF	BRA	Bruninho (from (Brazil) Sobradinho)
—	MF	UKR	Maksym Drachenko (from (Ukraine) Olimpik Donetsk)
—	MF	UKR	Mykyta Zhukov (on loan from (Ukraine) Inhulets Petrove)
—	FW	UKR	Aderinsola Habib Eseola (from (Ukraine) Arsenal Kyiv)

Out:

No.	Pos.	Nation	Player
—	GK	UKR	Hennadiy Hanyev (to (Ukraine) Inhulets Petrove)
—	DF	UKR	Yarema Kavatsiv (to (Ukraine) Veres Rivne)
—	DF	UKR	Volodymyr Bayenko (to (Uzbekistan) Buxoro)
—	DF	ESP	Aitor Fernández (to (Spain) Extremadura)
—	DF	ESP	Borja Ekiza
—	MF	UKR	Oleksandr Kochura (retired)
—	MF	UKR	Ruslan Zubkov (to (Belarus) Neman Grodno)
—	MF	UKR	Ihor Kalinin (to (Russia) Volgar Astrakhan)
—	FW	UKR	Roman Loktionov (to (Belarus) Neman Grodno)
—	FW	UKR	Artem Favorov (on loan to (Denmark) Vejle Boldklub)
—	FW	CRC	Jonathan Moya (loan return to (Costa Rica) Saprissa)

=== Zorya Luhansk ===
In:

No.	Pos.	Nation	Player
—	DF	UKR	Andriy Pylyavskyi (on loan from (Russia) Rubin Kazan)
—	MF	UKR	Ruslan Babenko (from (Norway) Bodø/Glimt)
—	MF	SRB	Anđelo Kačavenda (from (Serbia) Vojvodina)
—	MF	UKR	Maksym Banasevych (loan return from (Ukraine) Desna Chernihiv)
—	MF	UKR	Vladyslav Kalitvintsev (on loan from (Ukraine) Dynamo Kyiv)
—	FW	ARM	Gegham Kadymyan (from (Ukraine) Karpaty Lviv)

Out:

No.	Pos.	Nation	Player
—	GK	UKR	Andriy Poltavtsev (on loan to (Ukraine) Avanhard Kramatorsk)
—	DF	UKR	Yevhen Tkachuk (to (Kazakhstan) Irtysh Pavlodar)
—	MF	UKR	Oleksandr Karavayev (loan return to (Ukraine) Shakhtar)
—	MF	BLR	Mikhail Sivakow (to (Russia) FC Orenburg)
—	MF	UKR	Maksym Banasevych (to (Ukraine) Desna Chernihiv)
—	FW	UKR	Yaroslav Kvasov (to (Georgia (country)) Dinamo Batumi)
