= List of Ukrainian football transfers summer 2016 =

This is a list of Ukrainian football transfers summer 2016. only clubs in 2016–17 Ukrainian Premier League are included.

== Ukrainian Premier League ==
=== Chornomorets Odesa ===
In:

No.	Pos.	Nation	Player
—	GK	UKR	Danylo Kanevtsev (from (Ukraine) Metalist)
—	DF	UKR	Andriy Slinkin (loan return from (Moldova) Zaria Bălți)
—	DF	UKR	Serhiy Lyulka (from (Czech Republic) Slovan Liberec)
—	MF	UKR	Oleksandr Andriyevskyi (on loan from (Ukraine) Dynamo Kyiv)
—	MF	UKR	Andriy Korobenko (on loan from (Ukraine) Shakhtar)
—	MF	NGA	Sheriff Isa (free agent)
—	MF	UKR	Maksym Tretyakov (from (Ukraine) Dnipro)
—	FW	UKR	Oleksiy Khoblenko (from (Ukraine) Dynamo Kyiv)
—	FW	UKR	Vadym Yavorskyi (loan return from (Ukraine) Hirnyk-Sport)
—	FW	UKR	Navid Nasimi (loan return from (Ukraine) Hirnyk-Sport)
—	FW	UKR	Volodymyr Barilko (from (Ukraine) Metalist)

Out:

No.	Pos.	Nation	Player
—	DF	UKR	Andriy Slinkin (to (Moldova) Dacia Chișinău)
—	FW	UKR	Oleksiy Khoblenko (loan return to (Ukraine) Dynamo Kyiv)
—	FW	USA	Eugene Starikov (joined (United States) New York Cosmos in March 2017)
—	FW	UKR	Vadym Yavorskyi (on loan to (Ukraine) Veres Rivne, terminated in August)
—	FW	UKR	Petro Pereverza (on loan to (Ukraine) Zhemchuzhyna Odesa, terminated in August)
—	FW	UKR	Vadym Yavorskyi (on loan to (Ukraine) Hirnyk-Sport)
—	FW	UKR	Volodymyr Barilko (loan return to (Ukraine) Metalist)
—	FW	UKR	Navid Nasimi (to (Ukraine) Arsenal Kyiv)
—	FW	UKR	Yevhen Murashov (on loan to (Georgia (country)) Guria Lanchkhuti)

=== Dnipro ===
In:

No.	Pos.	Nation	Player
—	DF	UKR	Volodymyr Polyovyi (loan return from (Ukraine) Volyn Lutsk)
—	DF	BRA	Anderson Pico (from (Brazil) Flamengo)
—	MF	UKR	Serhiy Kravchenko (loan return from (Ukraine) Volyn Lutsk)
—	MF	UKR	Maksym Tretyakov (loan return from (Ukraine) Metalist)
—	FW	UKR	Yevhen Bokhashvili (loan return from (Ukraine) Naftovyk-Ukrnafta)
—	FW	UKR	Artem Dovbyk (from (Moldova) Zaria Bălți)

Out:

No.	Pos.	Nation	Player
—	GK	CZE	Jan Laštůvka (to (Czech Republic) MFK Karviná)
—	DF	BRA	Anderson Pico (loan return to (Brazil) Flamengo)
—	DF	BRA	Douglas (to (Brazil) São Paulo)
—	DF	SEN	Papa Gueye (to (Russia) FC Rostov)
—	DF	UKR	Artem Fedetskyi (to (Germany) SV Darmstadt 98)
—	DF	UKR	Dmytro Chyhrynskyi (to (Greece) AEK Athens)
—	DF	BRA	Léo Matos (to (Greece) PAOK)
—	DF	CRO	Ivan Tomečak (to (Saudi Arabia) Al-Nassr FC)
—	DF	UKR	Vitaliy Mandzyuk (retired)
—	MF	UKR	Yevhen Shakhov (to (Greece) PAOK)
—	MF	POR	Bruno Gama (to (Spain) Deportivo La Coruña)
—	MF	UKR	Roman Bezus (to (Belgium) Sint-Truiden)
—	MF	BRA	Matheus (to (China) SJZ Ever Bright)
—	MF	GEO	Aleksandre Kobakhidze (to (Ukraine) Vorskla Poltava)
—	MF	UKR	Edmar (joined (United States) Boca Raton in February 2017)
—	MF	UKR	Maksym Tretyakov (to (Ukraine) Chornomorets)
—	FW	UKR	Roman Zozulya (to (Spain) Real Betis)
—	FW	CRC	John Jairo Ruiz (loan return to (France) Lille)
—	FW	UKR	Maksym Salamakha (to (Ukraine) Karpaty Lviv)

=== Dynamo Kyiv ===
In:

No.	Pos.	Nation	Player
—	GK	UKR	Maksym Koval (loan return from (Denmark) Odense Boldklub)
—	DF	UKR	Andriy Tsurikov (loan return from (Greece) Levadiakos)
—	DF	UKR	Yevhen Selin (loan return from (Greece) Platanias)
—	DF	LVA	Vitālijs Jagodinskis (loan return from (Ukraine) Hoverla Uzhhorod)
—	DF	UKR	Dmytro Ryzhuk (loan return from (Ukraine) Metalist)
—	MF	UKR	Artem Hromov (from (Ukraine) Vorskla Poltava)
—	MF	MAR	Younès Belhanda (loan return from (Germany) FC Schalke 04)
—	MF	UKR	Vitaliy Hemeha (loan return from (Ukraine) Hoverla Uzhhorod)
—	MF	UKR	Yevhen Chumak (loan return from (Belarus) Torpedo-BelAZ)
—	MF	ARG	Facundo Bertoglio (loan return from (Greece) Asteras Tripolis)
—	MF	UKR	Vitaliy Kaverin (loan return from (Ukraine) Hoverla Uzhhorod)
—	MF	UKR	Ihor Kharatin (loan return from (Ukraine) Metalist)
—	MF	UKR	Orest Kuzyk (loan return from (Ukraine) Hoverla Uzhhorod)
—	MF	UKR	Oleksiy Savchenko (loan return from (Ukraine) Hoverla Uzhhorod)
—	FW	UKR	Oleksandr Hladkyy (from (Ukraine) Shakhtar)
—	FW	NGA	Lukman Haruna (loan return from (Kazakhstan) FC Astana)
—	FW	COD	Dieumerci Mbokani (loan return from (England) Norwich)
—	FW	UKR	Artem Kravets (loan return from (Germany) VfB Stuttgart)
—	FW	UKR	Oleksiy Khoblenko (loan return from (Ukraine) Chornomorets)
—	FW	UKR	Artem Besyedin (loan return from (Ukraine) Metalist)
—	FW	CIV	Junior Ahissan (from (Russia) Krylia Sovetov)

Out:

No.	Pos.	Nation	Player
—	DF	UKR	Andriy Tsurikov (on loan to (Ukraine) FC Oleksandriya)
—	DF	UKR	Dmytro Ryzhuk (to (Israel) Hapoel Acre)
—	DF	AUT	Aleksandar Dragović (to (Germany) Bayer Leverkusen)
—	DF	LVA	Vitālijs Jagodinskis (to (Hungary) Diósgyőri VTK)
—	DF	UKR	Pavlo Polehenko (to (Ukraine) Zirka Kropyvnytskyi)
—	MF	POR	Miguel Veloso (to (Italy) Genoa)
—	MF	SRB	Radosav Petrović (to (Portugal) Sporting CP)
—	MF	UKR	Oleksandr Andriyevskyi (on loan to (Ukraine) Chornomorets)
—	MF	UKR	Vitaliy Hemeha (on loan to (Poland) Wisła Płock)
—	MF	UKR	Oleksiy Savchenko (to (Ukraine) Cherkaskyi Dnipro)
—	MF	UKR	Yevhen Chumak (on loan to (Ukraine) Zirka Kropyvnytskyi, terminated in August)
—	MF	ARG	Facundo Bertoglio (to (Cyprus) APOEL)
—	MF	UKR	Ihor Kharatin (to (Ukraine) Zorya Luhansk)
—	MF	MAR	Younès Belhanda (on loan to (France) Nice)
—	MF	UKR	Artem Kozak (to (Greece) PAOK U-20)
—	MF	UKR	Yevhen Chumak (to (Ukraine) Karpaty Lviv)
—	MF	UKR	Yevhen Troyanovskyi (to (Ukraine) FC Poltava)
—	MF	UKR	Orest Kuzyk (to (Ukraine) Stal Kamianske)
—	FW	UKR	Oleksiy Khoblenko (to (Ukraine) Chornomorets)
—	FW	UKR	Oleksandr Yakovenko (retired)
—	FW	UKR	Roman Yaremchuk (on loan to (Ukraine) FC Oleksandriya)
—	FW	POL	Łukasz Teodorczyk (on loan to (Belgium) Anderlecht)
—	FW	UKR	Artem Kravets (on loan to (Spain) Granada)
—	FW	COD	Dieumerci Mbokani (on loan to (England) Hull City)

=== Karpaty Lviv ===
In:

No.	Pos.	Nation	Player
—	DF	UKR	Andriy Nesterov (from (Moldova) Zaria Bălți)
—	DF	UKR	Yevhen Zubeyko (from (Ukraine) Metalist)
—	MF	UKR	Serhiy Rudyka (from (Belarus) Shakhtyor Soligorsk)
—	MF	UKR	Kostyantyn Yaroshenko (from (Russia) Ural Yekaterinburg)
—	MF	UKR	Yevhen Chumak (from (Ukraine) Dynamo Kyiv)
—	FW	UKR	Mykhaylo Serhiychuk (loan return from (Ukraine) Hoverla Uzhhorod)
—	FW	UKR	Dmytro Zayikyn (from (Ukraine) Skala Stryi)
—	FW	UKR	Maksym Salamakha (from (Ukraine) Dnipro)

Out:

No.	Pos.	Nation	Player
—	DF	UKR	Oleh Holodyuk (to (Ukraine) Vorskla Poltava)
—	DF	UKR	Ihor Plastun (to (Bulgaria) Ludogorets)
—	DF	UKR	Andriy Hitchenko (to (Ukraine) FC Oleksandriya)
—	DF	UKR	Yevhen Neplyakh (to (Ukraine) Veres Rivne)
—	DF	UKR	Olexandr Dudarenko (to (Ukraine) MFC Mykolaiv)
—	MF	UKR	Denys Kozhanov (loan return to (Ukraine) Shakhtar)
—	MF	GEO	Murtaz Daushvili (to (Hungary) Diósgyőri)
—	FW	UKR	Mykhaylo Serhiychuk (to (Ukraine) Veres Rivne)
—	FW	UKR	Oleksiy Hutsulyak (on loan to (Spain) Villarreal)
—	FW	UKR	Taras Puchkovskyi (to (Ukraine) Veres Rivne)

=== Oleksandriya ===
In:

No.	Pos.	Nation	Player
—	DF	UKR	Andriy Tsurikov (on loan from (Ukraine) Dynamo Kyiv)
—	DF	UKR	Andriy Hitchenko (from (Ukraine) Karpaty Lviv)
—	DF	UKR	Maksym Zhychykov (on loan from (Ukraine) Shakhtar)
—	MF	UKR	Bohdan Borovskyi (from (Ukraine) Hirnyk Kryvyi Rih)
—	MF	UKR	Vladyslav Ohirya (from (Ukraine) Olimpik Donetsk)
—	FW	UKR	Roman Yaremchuk (on loan from (Ukraine) Dynamo Kyiv)

Out:

No.	Pos.	Nation	Player
—	DF	UKR	Maksym Imerekov (to (Belarus) Torpedo-BelAZ)
—	MF	UKR	Oleksandr Huskov (to (Ukraine) FC Poltava)
—	MF	GEO	David Targamadze (loan return to (Ukraine) Shakhtar)
—	MF	UKR	Denys Dedechko (to (Russia) FC SKA-Khabarovsk)
—	FW	UKR	Aderinsola Habib Eseola (to (Ukraine) Arsenal Kyiv)

=== Olimpik Donetsk ===
In:

No.	Pos.	Nation	Player
—	DF	UKR	Yaroslav Oliynyk (from (Ukraine) Illichivets)
—	DF	UKR	Artem Baranovskyi (from (Ukraine) Stal Kamianske)
—	MF	UKR	Vitaliy Kvashuk (from (Belarus) FC Torpedo-BelAZ Zhodino)
—	MF	UKR	Illya Kornyev (from (Ukraine) Metalist)
—	MF	UKR	Andriy Bohdanov (from (Ukraine) Volyn Lutsk)
—	FW	UKR	Serhiy Hryn (on loan from (Ukraine) Shakhtar Donetsk)

Out:

No.	Pos.	Nation	Player
—	GK	UKR	Serhiy Litovchenko (to (Georgia (country)) FC Zugdidi)
—	DF	UKR	Serhiy Borzenko (to (Ukraine) Veres Rivne)
—	DF	GUI	Sékou Condé (to (Russia) Amkar Perm)
—	MF	UKR	Dmytro Bashlay (to (Ukraine) Obolon-Brovar)
—	MF	UKR	Valeriy Lebed (to (Ukraine) Veres Rivne during winter t. w.)
—	MF	UKR	Oleksandr Volkov (to (Ukraine) Desna Chernihiv)
—	MF	UKR	Vladyslav Ohirya (to (Ukraine) FC Oleksandriya)
—	MF	UKR	Vitaliy Kvashuk
—	FW	UKR	Ruslan Stepanyuk (to (Ukraine) Veres Rivne)
—	FW	MAR	Moha Rharsalla (on loan to (Spain) Gimnàstic Tarragona)
—	FW	UKR	Denys Halenkov (to (Ukraine) Desna Chernihiv)

=== Shakhtar Donetsk ===
In:

No.	Pos.	Nation	Player
—	GK	UKR	Mykyta Shevchenko (loan return from (Ukraine) Zorya Luhansk)
—	DF	UKR	Bohdan Butko (loan return from (Russia) Amkar Perm)
—	DF	UKR	Eduard Sobol (loan return from (Ukraine) Metalist)
—	DF	UKR	Maksym Zhychykov (loan return from (Ukraine) Illichivets)
—	DF	UKR	Oleksandr Volovyk (loan return from (Belgium) OH Leuven)
—	DF	UKR	Ihor Honchar (loan return from (Ukraine) Hoverla Uzhhorod)
—	MF	UKR	Ivan Petryak (loan return from (Ukraine) Zorya Luhansk)
—	MF	UKR	Andriy Totovytskyi (loan return from (Ukraine) Zorya Luhansk)
—	MF	UKR	Vyacheslav Tankovskyi (loan return from (Ukraine) Zorya Luhansk)
—	MF	GEO	David Targamadze (loan return from (Ukraine) FC Oleksandriya)
—	MF	UKR	Denys Kozhanov (loan return from (Ukraine) Karpaty Lviv)
—	MF	UKR	Oleksiy Polyanskyi (loan return from (Ukraine) Metalist)
—	MF	UKR	Dmytro Ivanisenya (loan return from (Ukraine) Illichivets)
—	MF	UKR	Vasyl Shtander (loan return from (Georgia (country)) Guria Lanchkhuti)
—	MF	UKR	Vyacheslav Churko (loan return from (Hungary) Puskás Akadémia)
—	FW	UKR	Pylyp Budkivskyi (loan return from (Ukraine) Zorya Luhansk)
—	FW	UKR	Yevhen Seleznyov (from (Russia) Kuban Krasnodar)
—	FW	UKR	Vladyslav Kulach (loan return from (Turkey) Eskişehirspor)
—	FW	UKR	Anton Shynder (loan return from (Ukraine) Vorskla Poltava)
—	FW	UKR	Maksym Ilyuk (loan return from (Ukraine) Illichivets)
—	FW	UKR	Serhiy Hryn (loan return from (Ukraine) Illichivets)
—	FW	UKR	Artur Zahorulko (loan return from (Ukraine) Illichivets)

Out:

No.	Pos.	Nation	Player
—	GK	UKR	Bohdan Sarnavskyi (to (Russia) Ufa)
—	DF	UKR	Ihor Honchar (to (Slovakia) Senica)
—	DF	UKR	Eduard Sobol (on loan to (Ukraine) Zorya Luhansk)
—	DF	UKR	Maksym Zhychykov (on loan to (Ukraine) FC Oleksandriya)
—	MF	UKR	Ivan Petryak (on loan to (Ukraine) Zorya Luhansk)
—	MF	UKR	Denys Kozhanov (to (Moldova) Dacia Chișinău)
—	MF	UKR	Oleksiy Polyanskyi (to (Iran) Persepolis)
—	MF	UKR	Vyacheslav Churko (on loan to (Italy) Frosinone)
—	MF	UKR	Dmytro Ivanisenya (to (Ukraine) Illichivets)
—	MF	UKR	Andriy Totovytskyi (on loan to (Belgium) K.V. Kortrijk)
—	MF	UKR	Andriy Korobenko (on loan to (Ukraine) Chornomorets)
—	FW	UKR	Vladyslav Kulach (on loan to (Ukraine) Zorya Luhansk)
—	FW	UKR	Pylyp Budkivskyi (on loan to (Russia) Anzhi Makhachkala)
—	FW	UKR	Anton Shynder (to (Russia) Amkar Perm)
—	FW	UKR	Oleksandr Hladkyi (to (Ukraine) Dynamo Kyiv)
—	FW	UKR	Artur Zahorulko (on loan to (Ukraine) Vorskla Poltava)
—	FW	UKR	Vitaliy Vitsenets (retired)
—	FW	UKR	Valeriy Hryshyn (on loan to (Ukraine) Avanhard Kramatorsk)
—	FW	UKR	Vladyslav Buhay (on loan to (Ukraine) Bukovyna Chernivtsi)
—	FW	UKR	Serhiy Hryn (on loan to (Ukraine) Olimpik Donetsk)
—	FW	UKR	Maksym Ilyuk

=== Stal Kamianske ===
In:

No.	Pos.	Nation	Player
—	DF	AZE	Pavlo Pashayev (from (Azerbaijan) Gabala)
—	DF	SRB	Miloš Stamenković (from (Armenia) FC Shirak)
—	MF	UKR	Anton Kotlyar (loan return from (Belarus) FC Naftan Novopolotsk)
—	MF	UKR	Oleksiy Dovhyi (from (Ukraine) Vorskla Poltava)
—	MF	UKR	Orest Kuzyk (from (Ukraine) Dynamo Kyiv)
—	FW	NED	Sylvano Comvalius (from (Germany) Hessen Kassel)
—	FW	CUW	Boy Deul (from (Netherlands) FC Emmen)
—	FW	ARU	Erixon Danso (from (Netherlands) FC Emmen)
—	FW	GHA	Kwame Karikari (from (Norway) FK Haugesund)

Out:

No.	Pos.	Nation	Player
—	DF	NGA	Akeem Latifu (to (Turkey) Alanyaspor)
—	DF	BRA	Gabriel Araújo
—	DF	UKR	Serhiy Pshenychnykh
—	DF	UKR	Artem Baranovskyi (to (Ukraine) Olimpik Donetsk)
—	MF	UKR	Anton Kotlyar (to (Ukraine) Veres Rivne)
—	MF	UKR	Valeriy Kucherov (to (Ukraine) Veres Rivne)
—	MF	UKR	Oleksandr Kozak (on loan to (Ukraine) Illichivets)
—	MF	SRB	Đorđe Lazić (to (Greece) Xanthi)
—	FW	UKR	Yevhen Budnik (loan return to (Ukraine) Vorskla Poltava)
—	FW	CUW	Guyon Fernandez

=== Volyn Lutsk ===
In:

No.	Pos.	Nation	Player
—	DF	UKR	Dmytro Zaderetskyi (loan return from (Ukraine) Desna Chernihiv)

Out:

No.	Pos.	Nation	Player
—	GK	UKR	Bohdan Shust (to (Ukraine) Vorskla Poltava)
—	DF	CRO	Ivica Žunić (to (Russia) FC Orenburg)
—	DF	UKR	Volodymyr Polyovyi (loan return to (Ukraine) Dnipro)
—	DF	UKR	Vitaliy Pryndeta (to (Greece) Platanias)
—	MF	UKR	Oleh Humenyuk (to (Autonomous Republic of Crimea) TSK-Tavriya Simferopol)
—	MF	UKR	Serhiy Kravchenko (loan return to (Ukraine) Dnipro)
—	MF	UKR	Andriy Bohdanov (to (Ukraine) Olimpik Donetsk)
—	FW	UKR	Dmytro Kozban (to (Ukraine) Veres Rivne)

=== Vorskla Poltava ===
In:

No.	Pos.	Nation	Player
—	GK	UKR	Bohdan Shust (from (Ukraine) Volyn Lutsk)
—	DF	UKR	Oleh Holodyuk (from (Ukraine) Karpaty Lviv)
—	DF	UKR	Andriy Pylyavskyi (on loan from (Russia) Rubin Kazan)
—	MF	GEO	Aleksandre Kobakhidze (from (Ukraine) Dnipro)
—	MF	UKR	Yevhen Zarichnyuk (from (Moldova) FC Milsami Orhei)
—	MF	UZB	Sanzhar Tursunov (from (Qatar) Umm Salal SC)
—	MF	UKR	Petro Namuilyk (from (Slovenia) NK Zavrč)
—	FW	UKR	Yevhen Budnik (loan return from (Ukraine) Stal Kamianske)
—	FW	UKR	Artur Zahorulko (on loan from (Ukraine) Shakhtar)

Out:

No.	Pos.	Nation	Player
—	GK	UKR	Stanislav Bohush
—	DF	ALB	Armend Dallku (to (Kosovo) FC Prishtina)
—	MF	UKR	Artem Hromov (to (Ukraine) Dynamo Kyiv)
—	MF	UKR	Oleksiy Dovhyi (to (Ukraine) Stal Kamianske)
—	FW	UKR	Anton Shynder (loan return to (Ukraine) Shakhtar)
—	FW	UKR	Oleksandr Kovpak (to (Ukraine) Cherkaskyi Dnipro)
—	FW	UKR	Yevhen Budnik (on loan to (Belarus) Dinamo Minsk)
—	FW	UKR	Oleh Barannik (on loan to (Ukraine) Hirnyk-Sport)

=== Zirka Kropyvnytskyi ===
In:

No.	Pos.	Nation	Player
—	GK	UKR	Hennadiy Hanyev (from (Ukraine) Hirnyk Kryvyi Rih)
—	DF	UKR	Volodymyr Bayenko (from (Ukraine) Hirnyk Kryvyi Rih)
—	DF	ARG	Federico Pereyra (from (Bolivia) The Strongest)
—	DF	ESP	Borja Ekiza (from (Spain) SD Eibar)
—	DF	ESP	Aitor (from (Spain) Real Avilés)
—	DF	UKR	Pavlo Polehenko (from (Ukraine) Dynamo Kyiv)
—	MF	UKR	Vitaliy Havrysh (from (Ukraine) Hoverla Uzhhorod)
—	MF	UKR	Yevhen Chumak (on loan from (Ukraine) Dynamo Kyiv, terminated in August)
—	MF	UKR	Dmytro Bilonoh (on loan from (Russia) Ural Yekaterinburg)
—	MF	UKR	Artem Favorov (from (Ukraine) Obolon-Brovar)
—	MF	UKR	Ihor Kalinin (free agent)
—	FW	UKR	Artem Sitalo (from (Ukraine) Hirnyk Kryvyi Rih)
—	FW	CRC	Jonathan Moya (on loan from (Costa Rica) Saprissa)

Out:

No.	Pos.	Nation	Player
—	GK	UKR	Pavlo Poshtarenko (to (Ukraine) Obolon-Brovar)
—	DF	UKR	Oleh Dopilka (joined (Ukraine) FC Minaj in May 2017)
—	MF	UKR	Andriy Mostovyi (to (Ukraine) Desna Chernihiv)
—	MF	UKR	Borys Baranets (to (Ukraine) Rukh Vynnyky)
—	MF	UKR	Hryhoriy Baranets (to (Ukraine) Rukh Vynnyky)
—	MF	UKR	Vitaliy Havrysh (to (Ukraine) Kolos Kovalivka)
—	FW	UKR	Oleksandr Derebchynsky

=== Zorya Luhansk ===
In:

No.	Pos.	Nation	Player
—	GK	UKR	Oleh Chuvayev (from (Russia) Tom Tomsk)
—	GK	UKR	Andriy Poltavtsev (loan return from (Georgia (country)) FC Guria Lanchkhuti)
—	DF	UKR	Eduard Sobol (on loan from (Ukraine) Shakhtar)
—	MF	UKR	Ihor Kharatin (from (Ukraine) Dynamo Kyiv)
—	FW	UKR	Vladyslav Kulach (on loan from (Ukraine) Shakhtar)

Out:

No.	Pos.	Nation	Player
—	GK	UKR	Mykyta Shevchenko (loan return to (Ukraine) Shakhtar)
—	MF	UKR	Andriy Totovytskyi (loan return to (Ukraine) Shakhtar)
—	MF	UKR	Vyacheslav Tankovskyi (loan return to (Ukraine) Shakhtar)
—	MF	UKR	Kyrylo Doroshenko (to (Ukraine) Illichivets)
—	FW	UKR	Pylyp Budkivskyi (loan return to (Ukraine) Shakhtar)
