= List of Georgian football transfers winter 2021–22 =

This is a list of Georgian football transfers winter 2021–22. Only clubs in 2021 Erovnuli Liga are included.

== Dinamo Batumi ==
In: Note: Flags indicate national team as defined under FIFA eligibility rules; some limited exceptions apply. Players may hold more than one non-FIFA nationality.

No.	Pos.	Nation	Player
99	MF	GEO	Zuriko Davitashvili (from (Russia) Arsenal Tula)
99	FW	GEO	Elguja Lobjanidze (from (Kazakhstan) Tobol)

Out: Note: Flags indicate national team as defined under FIFA eligibility rules; some limited exceptions apply. Players may hold more than one non-FIFA nationality.

No.	Pos.	Nation	Player
13	MF	UKR	Giuli Mandzhgaladze (to (Georgia (country)) Torpedo Kutaisi)

== Dinamo Tbilisi ==
In: Note: Flags indicate national team as defined under FIFA eligibility rules; some limited exceptions apply. Players may hold more than one non-FIFA nationality.

No.	Pos.	Nation	Player
—	DF	NGR	Stanislav Bilenkyi (on loan from (Poland) Jagiellonia)
—	FW	BLR	Dmitry Antilevsky (from (Belarus) Torpedo-BelAZ Zhodino)
—	FW	UKR	Stanislav Bilenkyi (from (Slovakia) DAC Dunajská Streda)

Out: Note: Flags indicate national team as defined under FIFA eligibility rules; some limited exceptions apply. Players may hold more than one non-FIFA nationality.

No.	Pos.	Nation	Player
—	DF	NED	Fabian Sporkslede (to (Israel) Bnei Sakhnin)

== Dila Gori ==
In: Note: Flags indicate national team as defined under FIFA eligibility rules; some limited exceptions apply. Players may hold more than one non-FIFA nationality.

No.	Pos.	Nation	Player
—	GK	UKR	Danylo Kanevtsev (from (Ukraine) Metalist Kharkiv)
—	MF	MLI	Hadji Dramé (from (Estonia) Paide Linnameeskond)
—	MF	BRA	Alvaro (on loan from (Ukraine) Lviv)
—	MF	BRA	Vagner Gonçalves (from (Ukraine) Dnipro-1)

Out: Note: Flags indicate national team as defined under FIFA eligibility rules; some limited exceptions apply. Players may hold more than one non-FIFA nationality.

No.	Pos.	Nation	Player

== Gagra ==
In: Note: Flags indicate national team as defined under FIFA eligibility rules; some limited exceptions apply. Players may hold more than one non-FIFA nationality.

No.	Pos.	Nation	Player
—	MF	GEO	Temur Chogadze (from (Georgia (country)) Telavi)
—	MF	GEO	Mate Vatsadze (from (Uzbekistan) Qizilqum)
—	MF	GEO	Solomon Kvirkvelia (from (Ukraine) Metalist 1925 Kharkiv)

Out: Note: Flags indicate national team as defined under FIFA eligibility rules; some limited exceptions apply. Players may hold more than one non-FIFA nationality.

No.	Pos.	Nation	Player

== Locomotive Tbilisi ==
In: Note: Flags indicate national team as defined under FIFA eligibility rules; some limited exceptions apply. Players may hold more than one non-FIFA nationality.

No.	Pos.	Nation	Player

Out: Note: Flags indicate national team as defined under FIFA eligibility rules; some limited exceptions apply. Players may hold more than one non-FIFA nationality.

No.	Pos.	Nation	Player
—	GK	NED	Mark Spenkelink (to (Netherlands) RKC Waalwijk)
—	MF	GEO	Kakha Kakhabrishvili (from (Armenia) Van)

== Saburtalo Tbilisi ==
In: Note: Flags indicate national team as defined under FIFA eligibility rules; some limited exceptions apply. Players may hold more than one non-FIFA nationality.

No.	Pos.	Nation	Player

Out: Note: Flags indicate national team as defined under FIFA eligibility rules; some limited exceptions apply. Players may hold more than one non-FIFA nationality.

No.	Pos.	Nation	Player
—	MF	MDA	Dmitri Mandrîcenco (to (Ukraine) Inhulets Petrove)

== Samgurali Tsqaltubo ==
In: Note: Flags indicate national team as defined under FIFA eligibility rules; some limited exceptions apply. Players may hold more than one non-FIFA nationality.

No.	Pos.	Nation	Player

Out: Note: Flags indicate national team as defined under FIFA eligibility rules; some limited exceptions apply. Players may hold more than one non-FIFA nationality.

No.	Pos.	Nation	Player

== Samtredia ==
In: Note: Flags indicate national team as defined under FIFA eligibility rules; some limited exceptions apply. Players may hold more than one non-FIFA nationality.

No.	Pos.	Nation	Player
—	MF	BLR	Dzmitry Rekish (from (Georgia (country)) Torpedo Kutaisi)

Out: Note: Flags indicate national team as defined under FIFA eligibility rules; some limited exceptions apply. Players may hold more than one non-FIFA nationality.

No.	Pos.	Nation	Player
—	MF	GEO	Giorgi Gadrani (to (Georgia (country)) Sioni Bolnisi)

== Shukura Kobuleti ==
In: Note: Flags indicate national team as defined under FIFA eligibility rules; some limited exceptions apply. Players may hold more than one non-FIFA nationality.

No.	Pos.	Nation	Player
—	MF	GEO	Giorgi Janelidze (from (Georgia (country)) Telavi)

Out: Note: Flags indicate national team as defined under FIFA eligibility rules; some limited exceptions apply. Players may hold more than one non-FIFA nationality.

No.	Pos.	Nation	Player

== Sioni Bolnisi ==
In: Note: Flags indicate national team as defined under FIFA eligibility rules; some limited exceptions apply. Players may hold more than one non-FIFA nationality.

No.	Pos.	Nation	Player
—	MF	GEO	Giorgi Gadrani (from (Georgia (country)) Samtredia)
—	MF	GEO	Zaza Tsitskishvili (from (Kazakhstan) Aktobe)
—	MF	BLR	Vladimir Medved (from (Kazakhstan) Aktobe)
—	MF	GEO	Luka Koberidze (from (Ukraine) VPK-Ahro Shevchenkivka)

Out: Note: Flags indicate national team as defined under FIFA eligibility rules; some limited exceptions apply. Players may hold more than one non-FIFA nationality.

No.	Pos.	Nation	Player

== Telavi ==
In: Note: Flags indicate national team as defined under FIFA eligibility rules; some limited exceptions apply. Players may hold more than one non-FIFA nationality.

No.	Pos.	Nation	Player
—	DF	GEO	Zurab Gigashvili (from (Ukraine) Kryvbas Kryvyi Rih)
—	FW	GEO	Guram Goshteliani (from (Bulgaria) Pirin Blagoevgrad)
—	FW	GEO	David Mujiri (from (Slovakia) ViOn Zlaté Moravce)

Out: Note: Flags indicate national team as defined under FIFA eligibility rules; some limited exceptions apply. Players may hold more than one non-FIFA nationality.

No.	Pos.	Nation	Player
15	MF	AZE	Vugar Beybalayev (to (Azerbaijan) Sumgayit)
—	MF	GEO	Rati Ardazishvili (to (Kazakhstan) Aktobe)
—	MF	GEO	Temur Chogadze (to (Georgia (country)) Gagra)
—	MF	GEO	Giorgi Janelidze (to (Georgia (country)) Shukura Kobuleti)

== Torpedo Kutaisi ==
In: Note: Flags indicate national team as defined under FIFA eligibility rules; some limited exceptions apply. Players may hold more than one non-FIFA nationality.

No.	Pos.	Nation	Player
—	DF	GEO	Nika Sandokhadze (from (Georgia (country)) Locomotive Tbilisi)
—	MF	GEO	Giorgi Arabidze (from (Portugal) Nacional)
—	MF	GEO	Giorgi Papunashvili (from (Cyprus) Apollon Limassol)
—	MF	GEO	Beka Vachiberadze (from (Ukraine) Chornomorets Odesa)
—	MF	UKR	Levan Arveladze (from (Ukraine) Desna Chernihiv)
—	MF	UKR	Giuli Mandzhgaladze (from (Georgia (country)) Dinamo Batumi)

Out: Note: Flags indicate national team as defined under FIFA eligibility rules; some limited exceptions apply. Players may hold more than one non-FIFA nationality.

No.	Pos.	Nation	Player
—	MF	KAZ	Magomed Paragulgov (to (Kazakhstan) Atyrau)
—	MF	BLR	Dzmitry Rekish (to (Georgia (country)) Samtredia)
