= Davit Khocholava =

Georgian footballer (born 1993)

Davit Khocholava დავით ხოჭოლავა
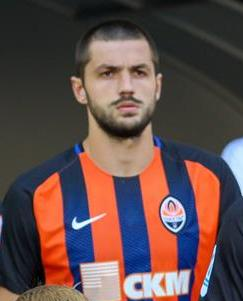
- Khocholava with Shakhtar Donetsk in 2018

Personal information
- Date of birth: 8 February 1993 (age 33)
- Place of birth: Tbilisi, Georgia
- Height: 1.92 m (6 ft 4 in)
- Position: Centre-back

Youth career
- 2004–2009: Saburtalo Tbilisi

Senior career*
Years	Team	Apps	(Gls)
2009–2011	Saburtalo Tbilisi	0	(0)
2010	→ Olimpi Rustavi (loan)	2	(0)
2011	→ Sioni Bolnisi (loan)	0	(0)
2011–2014	Dinamo Tbilisi	11	(0)
2014	→ Kolkheti Poti (loan)	6	(1)
2014–2015	Shukura Kobuleti	25	(1)
2015–2017	Chornomorets Odesa	42	(3)
2017–2021	Shakhtar Donetsk	56	(3)
2021–2024	Copenhagen	40	(1)
Total		182	(9)

International career
2009–2010	Georgia U17	13	(3)
2010–2011	Georgia U19	5	(0)
2011–2012	Georgia U21	5	(0)
2017–2024	Georgia	39	(0)
- * Club domestic league appearances and goals

Davit Khocholava (Georgian: დავით ხოჭოლავა, romanized: davit khoch'olava, pronounced [davitʰ χotʃʼolava]; born 8 February 1993) is a Georgian retired professional footballer who played as a centre-back.

== Club career ==
=== Early years ===
Born in Tbilisi, Khocholava started his career in Saburtalo, where his first manager was Giorgi Devdariani. Later some of the members of his team, including Valeri Kazaishvili, Giorgi Chanturia and Lasha Parunashvili, became Georgia internationals. Khocholava was a striker during his youth career. However, Devdariani later offered him to play in defense and Khocholava accepted.

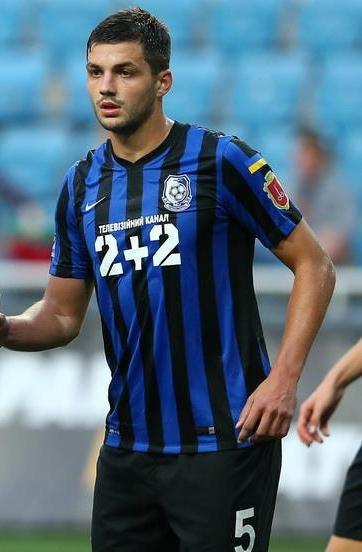
Khocholava with Chornomorets Odesa in 2016

Khocholava signed for Dinamo Tbilisi in 2011. He found it difficult to become a member of the starting line-up, having a six-month loan spell at Kolkheti Poti in order to get some more playing time. In 2014, he decided to leave Tbilisi-based club and moved to Shukura Kobuleti. He was offered to the club after the recommendation of famous Georgian footballer Revaz Chelebadze, who played for Dinamo Tbilisi in Soviet era. He was the sporting director of the club.

Khocholava spent the 2014–15 season with the club before signing for Chornomorets Odesa in summer 2015. He became the regular member of the starting line-up. He was named in the symbolic team of the Ukrainian Premier League in March 2017.

=== Shakhtar Donetsk ===
In April 2017, Shakhtar Donetsk confirmed that Khocholava had signed a five-year deal with the club, joining them at the start of the following season.

=== Copenhagen ===
On 6 July 2021, Danish Superliga side F.C. Copenhagen announced they had signed Khocholava on a four-year deal. On 8 August he scored his first goal for the club in a 4–2 victory in the Copenhagen Derby against rivals Brøndby IF. On 22 May 2022, with the club he won the Danish Superliga in the season 2021–22 and qualified for the UEFA Champions League for the season 2022–23. On July 7, 2024, Khocholava announced his decision to retire from professional football.

== International career ==
Khocholava was named in the Georgia national team's senior squad for a 2018 FIFA World Cup qualifier against Austria in September 2016. He made his debut for Georgia on 23 January 2017 in a friendly against Uzbekistan.

== Career statistics ==
=== Club ===
Appearances and goals by club, season and competition
Club	Season	League			National cup		Continental		Other		Total	
Club	Season	Division	Apps	Goals	Apps	Goals	Apps	Goals	Apps	Goals	Apps	Goals
Olimpi Rustavi (loan)	2010–11	Umaglesi Liga	2	0	1	0	0	0	0	0	3	0
Dinamo Tbilisi	2011–12	Umaglesi Liga	5	0	0	0	0	0	0	0	5	0
Dinamo Tbilisi	2012–13	Umaglesi Liga	3	0	2	0	0	0	0	0	5	0
Dinamo Tbilisi	2013–14	Umaglesi Liga	3	0	0	0	3 (Note: Two appearances in UEFA Champions League, one in UEFA Europa League)	0	0	0	6	0
Dinamo Tbilisi	Total		11	0	2	0	3	0	0	0	16	0
Kolkheti Poti (loan)	2013–14	Pirveli Liga	6	1	0	0	–		0	0	6	1
Shukura Kobuleti	2014–15	Umaglesi Liga	25	1	4	1	–		0	0	29	2
Chornomorets Odesa	2015–16	Ukrainian Premier League	18	1	2	0	–		0	0	20	1
Chornomorets Odesa	2016–17	Ukrainian Premier League	24	2	0	0	–		0	0	24	2
Chornomorets Odesa	Total		42	3	2	0	0	0	0	0	44	3
Shakhtar Donetsk	2017–18	Ukrainian Premier League	14	1	4	0	4 (Note: Appearances in UEFA Champions League)	0	0	0	22	1
Shakhtar Donetsk	2018–19	Ukrainian Premier League	25	2	3	0	5 (Note: Three appearances in UEFA Champions League, two in UEFA Europa League)	0	0	0	33	2
Shakhtar Donetsk	2019–20	Ukrainian Premier League	10	0	1	0	4 (Note: Appearances in UEFA Europa League)	0	1 (Note: Appearance in Ukrainian Super Cup)	0	16	0
Shakhtar Donetsk	2020–21	Ukrainian Premier League	7	0	1	0	4	0	0	0	12	0
Shakhtar Donetsk	Total		56	3	9	0	17	0	1	0	83	3
Copenhagen	2021–22	Danish Superliga	22	1	0	0	12 (Note: Appearances in UEFA Europa Conference League)	0	0	0	34	1
Copenhagen	2022–23	Danish Superliga	17	0	3	1	7	0	0	0	27	1
Copenhagen	2023–24	Danish Superliga	1	0	0	0	0	0	0	0	1	0
Copenhagen	Total		40	1	3	1	19	0	0	0	62	2
Career total			182	9	21	2	39	0	1	0	243	11

=== International ===
Appearances and goals by national team and year
National team	Year	Apps	Goals
Georgia	2017	9	0
Georgia	2018	7	0
Georgia	2019	5	0
Georgia	2020	4	0
Georgia	2021	7	0
Georgia	2022	2	0
Total		34	0

== Honours ==
Olimpi Rustavi

- Georgian Super Cup: 2010

Dinamo Tbilisi

- Georgian League: 2012–13
- Georgian Cup: 2012–13

Shakhtar Donetsk

- Ukrainian Premier League: 2017–18, 2018–19, 2019–20
- Ukrainian Cup: 2017–18, 2018–19
- Ukrainian Super Cup: 2017

Copenhagen

- Danish Superliga: 2021–22
