= Serhiy Barilko =

Ukrainian footballer

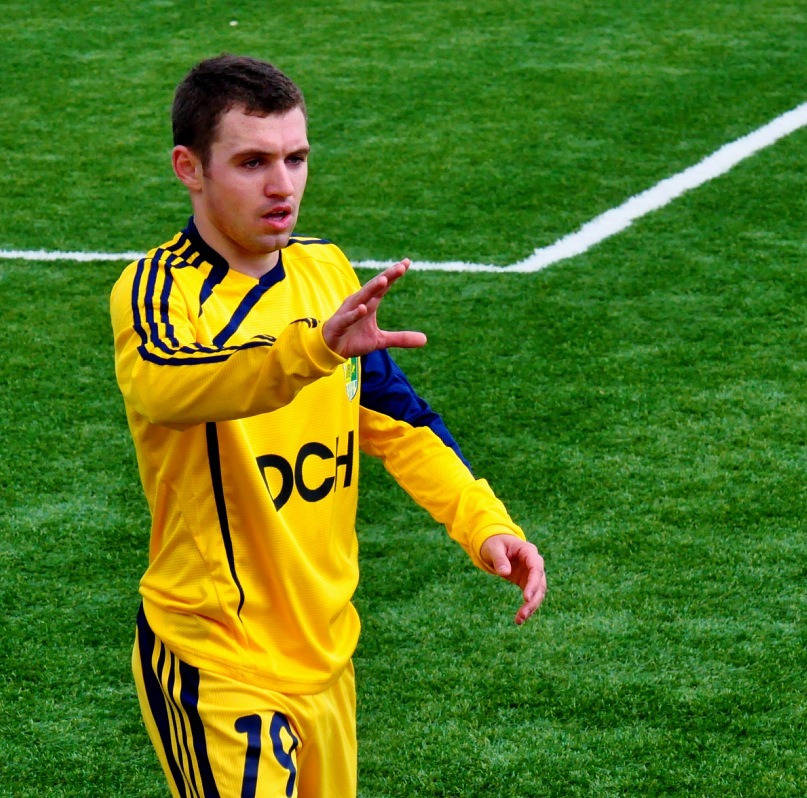
- Barilko in 2011

Personal information
- Full name: Serhiy Volodymyrovych Barilko
- Date of birth: 5 January 1987 (age 39)
- Place of birth: Kharkiv, Ukrainian SSR
- Height: 1.78 m (5 ft 10 in)
- Position: Midfielder

Youth career
- 2001–2005: FC Metalist Kharkiv

Senior career*
Years	Team	Apps	(Gls)
2005–2011	Metalist Kharkiv	13	(0)
2011	Obolon Kyiv	6	(0)
2011–2015	Elektrovazhmash Kharkiv (amateurs)	?	(?)
2015–2016	Metalist Kharkiv	11	(0)
- * Club domestic league appearances and goals as of 29 June 2016

Serhiy Volodymyrovych Barilko (Ukrainian: Сергій Володимирович Барілко; born 5 January 1987) is a professional Ukrainian football midfielder.

== Career ==
Barilko was the product of the Metalist Youth School system. Myron Markevych promoted Barilko to the senior team at the end of the 2006–07 season. However, Barilko continues to play for the Metalist Reserves as well.

== Personal life ==
His brother Volodymyr Barilko is also a professional footballer.
