= Denys Filimonov =

Ukrainian footballer

Denys Filimonov Денис Філімонов
Personal information
- Full name: Denys Volodymyrovych Filimonov
- Date of birth: 4 January 1971 (age 55)
- Place of birth: Soviet Union
- Height: 1.76 m (5 ft 9 in)
- Position: Striker

Youth career
- Dnipro Dnipropetrovsk

Senior career*
Years	Team	Apps	(Gls)
1988–1991	Dnipro Dnipropetrovsk-d	14	(1)
1989	→Shakhtar Pavlohrad	1	(0)
1991	→Krystal Kherson	7	(1)
1992	Kryvbas Kryvyi Rih	37	(21)
1993–1994	Veres Rivne	54	(8)
1994–1995	Ironi Rishon LeZion	2	(1)
1995–1996	Bukovyna Chernivtsi	54	(11)
1996–2001	Dnipro Dnipropetrovsk	57	(10)
1997	→Kryvbas Kryvyi Rih	14	(1)
1998	→Dnipro-2 Dnipropetrovsk	1	(0)
2000	→Dnipro-2 Dnipropetrovsk	9	(1)
2001	→Dnipro-3 Dnipropetrovsk	4	(0)
2002	FC Ekibastuzets	15	(1)
- * Club domestic league appearances and goals

Denys Filimonov (Ukrainian: Денис Володимирович Філімонов; born 4 January 1971) is a Ukrainian former football forward. He was top scorer of the Ukrainian First League in 1992.

He is a father of Ukrainian footballer Artem Filimonov and Ukrainian blogger Maria Filimonova.

His first coach in football was Volodymyr Stryzhevskyi.
