= Yevhen Martynenko =

Ukrainian footballer (born 1993)

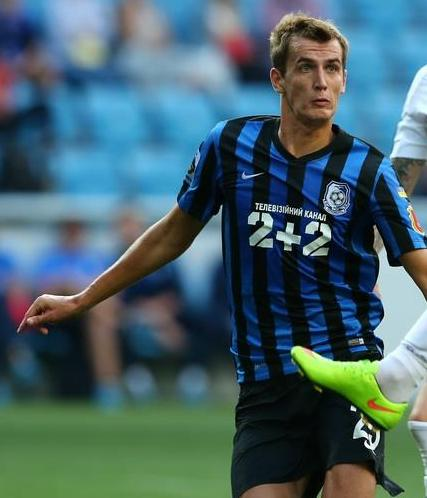
- Yevhen Martynenko in 2015

Personal information
- Full name: Yevhen Olehovych Martynenko
- Date of birth: 25 June 1993 (age 33)
- Place of birth: Odesa, Ukraine
- Height: 1.93 m (6 ft 4 in)
- Position: Centre-back

Team information
- Current team: Fana

Youth career
- 2006–2011: Chornomorets Odesa

Senior career*
Years	Team	Apps	(Gls)
2011–2018	Chornomorets Odesa	63	(4)
2011	→ Chornomorets-2 Odesa	6	(0)
2018–2020	Vorskla Poltava	23	(0)
2020–2022	Chornomorets Odesa	20	(1)
2022–	Fana		
- * Club domestic league appearances and goals as of 29 June 2022

Yevhen Olehovych Martynenko (Ukrainian: Євген Олегович Мартиненко; born 25 June 1993) is a Ukrainian professional footballer who plays as a centre-back for Norwegian club Fana.

== Career ==
=== Early years ===
Martynenko is a product of Chornomorets Odesa academy.

=== Chornomorets Odesa ===
He made his debut for Chornomorets in the game against Hoverla Uzhhorod on 11 May 2014 in the Ukrainian Premier League.

=== Vorskla Poltava ===
On 23 June 2018, he moved to Ukrainian Premier League club Vorskla Poltava.

=== Return to Chornomorets Odesa ===
In September 2020, Martynenko returned to Chornomorets Odesa.
