= Yevhen Smirnov =

Ukrainian footballer

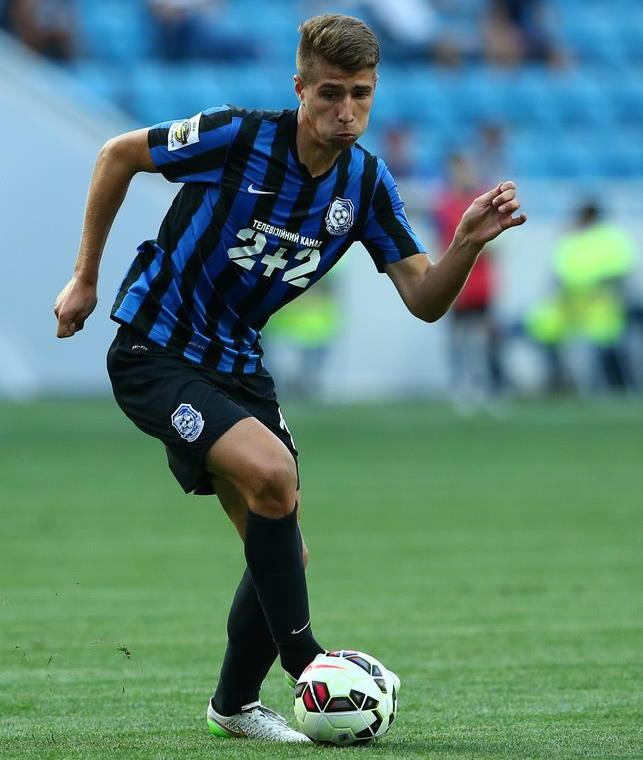
- Smirnov with Chornomorets Odesa in 2015

Personal information
- Full name: Yevhen Valeriyovych Smirnov
- Date of birth: 16 April 1993 (age 33)
- Place of birth: Odesa, Ukraine
- Height: 1.85 m (6 ft 1 in)
- Positions: Centre-back; defensive midfielder

Youth career
- 2006–2011: Chornomorets Odesa

Senior career*
Years	Team	Apps	(Gls)
2011–2018	Chornomorets Odesa	68	(5)
2011	Chornomorets-2 Odesa	7	(0)
2014	→ Tiraspol (loan)	13	(2)
2019	Gomel	7	(0)
2020	Sfântul Gheorghe Suruceni	18	(2)
2021	Turan	9	(0)
2022	Sfântul Gheorghe Suruceni	14	(0)
2023	Slatina	1	(0)
2023	Sūduva	11	(2)
2024	Mławianka Mława	11	(0)
2024–2025	Weszło Warsaw	29	(1)
2025–2026	Lewart Lubartów	15	(0)
Total		203	(12)
- * Club domestic league appearances and goals

Yevhen Smirnov (Ukrainian: Євген Валерійович Смірнов; born 16 April 1993) is a Ukrainian former professional footballer who played as a centre-back or defensive midfielder.

== Career ==
Smirnov is a product of Chornomorets Odesa's youth team systems and his first trainer was Vitaliy Hotsulyak. In July 2014, he was sent on loan to Tiraspol.

== Honours ==
Sfântul Gheorghe Suruceni

- Moldovan Cup: 2020–21
