= Andriy Bubentsov =

Ukrainian footballer

Personal information
- Full name: Andriy Volodymyrovych Bubentsov
- Date of birth: 2 March 1998 (age 28)
- Place of birth: Marhanets, Ukraine
- Height: 1.90 m (6 ft 3 in)
- Position: Goalkeeper

Team information
- Current team: Talent Warsaw
- Number: 65

Youth career
- 2009–2011: Shakhtar Marhanets
- 2011–2015: Inter Dnipropetrovsk
- 2015–2016: Oleksandriya
- 2016–2017: Shakhtar Donetsk
- 2016: → Arsenal Kyiv (loan)
- 2017: → Oleksandriya (loan)

Senior career*
Years	Team	Apps	(Gls)
2018–2019	Sumy	5	(0)
2019–2021	VPK-Ahro Shevchenkivka	44	(0)
2021	Mykolaiv	15	(0)
2021–2022	Metalist Kharkiv	0	(0)
2022	→ Polissya Zhytomyr (loan)	0	(0)
2022–2023	Orlęta Radzyń Podlaski	11	(0)
2023–2024	Tygrys Huta Mińska	11	(0)
2024–	Talent Warsaw	5	(0)
- * Club domestic league appearances and goals as of 16:20, 20 June 2025 (UTC)

Andriy Volodymyrovych Bubentsov (Ukrainian: Андрій Володимирович Бубенцов; born 2 March 1998) is a Ukrainian professional footballer who plays as a goalkeeper for Polish IV liga Masovia club Talent Warsaw.

== Honours ==
Tygrys Huta Mińska

- V liga Masovia II: 2023–24
