= Giorgi Gadrani =

Georgian footballer

Personal information
- Date of birth: 30 September 1994 (age 32)
- Place of birth: Tbilisi, Georgia
- Height: 1.92 m (6 ft 3 1/2 in)
- Position: Centre back

Senior career*
Years	Team	Apps	(Gls)
2012–2015	Gagra	49	(1)
2015–2017	Chornomorets Odesa	11	(0)
2017	Dinamo Tbilisi	3	(0)
2018	Desna Chernihiv	7	(0)
2018	Dila Gori	19	(1)
2019	Dinamo Batumi	5	(1)
2019–2020	Torpedo Kutaisi	4	(0)
2020	Shukura Kobuleti	5	(0)
2021	VPK-Ahro Shevchenkivka	5	(0)
2021	Samtredia	14	(2)
2022	Sioni Bolnisi	8	(0)
2023	Spaeri	14	(0)
2024	Merani Martvili		
2024	Khosilot Farkhor	1	(0)
2025	Atyrau	8	(0)
2025	Samtredia	9	(0)

International career
2015–2016	Georgia U21	4	(0)
- * Club domestic league appearances and goals as of 5 March 2026

Giorgi Gadrani (Georgian: გიორგი გადრანი; 30 September 1994) is a Georgian professional football defender.

== Club career ==
=== Chornomorets Odesa ===
In April 2015, he signed for FC Chornomorets Odesa in Ukrainian Premier League.

=== Desna Chernihiv ===
In March 2018 he signed for Desna Chernihiv in Ukrainian First League where he played 7 games.

=== Dila Gori ===
In summer 2018, he moved to Dila Gori in Erovnuli Liga.

=== Dinamo Batumi ===
In January 2020 he moved to Dinamo Batumi in Erovnuli Liga, where he played 5 matches.

=== VPK-Ahro Shevchenkivka ===
In 2021, he moved to VPK-Ahro Shevchenkivka in the Ukrainian First League and on 23 April, he played in the match against Chornomorets Odesa at the Chornomorets Stadium.

=== Samtredia ===
In summer 2021, he moved to Samtredia in Erovnuli Liga. On 8 August he made his debut with the new club against Dinamo Batumi at the Batumi Stadium and he started playing more regular. On 1 November 2021 he scored his first goal with the new club against Locomotive Tbilisi in Erovnuli Liga in the season 2021. On 21 November 2021 he scored against Torpedo Kutaisi in Erovnuli Liga in the season 2021.

=== Sioni Bolnisi ===
In 2022 he signed to Sioni Bolnisi just promoted to Erovnuli Liga.

=== Khosilot Farkhor ===
On 12 July 2024, Tajikistan Higher League club Khosilot Farkhor announced the signing of Gadrani to a six-month contract.

=== Atyrau ===
In February 2025 he signed for Atyrau in Kazakhstan Premier League. In May 2025 he was released by the club.

=== Samtredia ===
In July 2025, he moved back again to Samtredia in Erovnuli Liga 2. On 23 September 2024 he scored in the Georgian Cup against Rustavi.

== Career statistics ==
=== Club ===
As of match played 30 October 2025

Appearances and goals by club, season and competition
Club	Season	League			Cup		Europe		Other		Total	
Club	Season	Division	Apps	Goals	Apps	Goals	Apps	Goals	Apps	Goals	Apps	Goals
Gagra	2012–13	Pirveli Liga	12	0	2	0	0	0	0	0	14	0
Gagra	2013–14	Pirveli Liga	20	1	1	0	0	0	0	0	21	1
Gagra	2014–15	Pirveli Liga	17	0	1	0	0	0	0	0	18	0
Chornomorets Odesa	2014–15	Ukrainian Premier League	0	0	1	0	0	0	0	0	1	0
Chornomorets Odesa	2015–16	Ukrainian Premier League	4	0	1	0	0	0	0	0	5	0
Chornomorets Odesa	2016–17	Ukrainian Premier League	7	0	1	0	0	0	0	0	8	0
Dinamo Tbilisi	2017	Erovnuli Liga	3	0	0	0	0	0	0	0	3	0
Desna Chernihiv	2017–18	Ukrainian First League	7	0	0	0	0	0	0	0	7	0
Dila Gori	2018	Erovnuli Liga	10	1	0	0	0	0	0	0	10	1
Dinamo Batumi	2019	Erovnuli Liga	5	1	0	0	0	0	0	0	5	1
Torpedo Kutaisi	2019	Erovnuli Liga	4	0	0	0	0	0	0	0	4	0
Shukura Kobuleti	2020	Erovnuli Liga 2	5	0	1	0	0	0	0	0	6	0
VPK-Ahro Shevchenkivka	2020–21	Ukrainian First League	5	0	0	0	0	0	0	0	5	0
Samtredia	2021	Erovnuli Liga	14	2	0	0	0	0	0	0	14	2
Sioni Bolnisi	2022	Erovnuli Liga	8	0	0	0	0	0	0	0	8	0
Spaeri	2023	Erovnuli Liga 2	14	2	1	0	0	0	1	0	16	2
Khosilot Farkhor	2024	Tajikistan Higher League	1	0	0	0	0	0	0	0	1	0
Atyrau	2025	Kazakhstan Premier League	8	0	0	0	0	0	0	0	8	0
Samtredia	2025	Erovnuli Liga 2	9	0	3	1	0	0	0	0	12	1
Career total			153	7	12	1	0	0	1	0	165	8

== Honours ==
Torpedo Kutaisi

- Georgian Super Cup: 2019

Dinamo Batumi

- Erovnuli Liga runner-up: 2019

Dinamo Tbilisi

- Erovnuli Liga runner-up: 2017
