= Artem Filimonov =

Ukrainian footballer (born 1994)

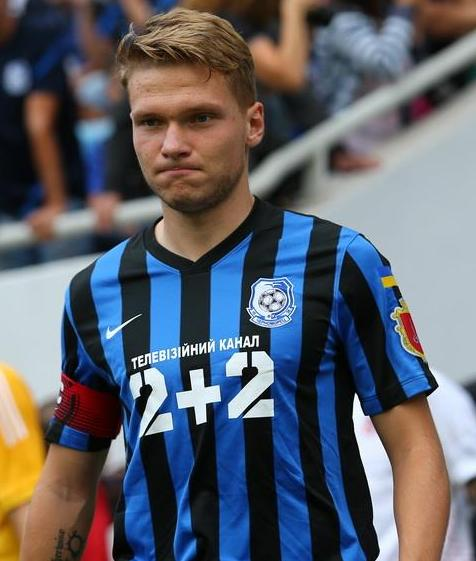

Personal information
- Full name: Artem Denysovych Filimonov
- Date of birth: 21 February 1994 (age 32)
- Place of birth: Rivne, Ukraine
- Height: 1.80 m (5 ft 11 in)
- Position: Midfielder

Team information
- Current team: Pirin Blagoevgrad (assistant manager)

Youth career
- 2006–2010: Dnipro Dnipropetrovsk
- 2010–2011: Metalist Kharkiv

Senior career*
Years	Team	Apps	(Gls)
2011–2013	Dnipro Dnipropetrovsk	0	(0)
2013–2016	Chornomorets Odesa	45	(1)
2017	Karpaty Lviv	8	(0)
2017	→ Pafos (loan)	0	(0)
2018	Gomel	9	(0)
2018	Ventspils	4	(0)
2019	Olimpia Grudziądz	0	(0)
Total		66	(1)

International career
2010	Ukraine U16	8	(1)
2009–2010	Ukraine U17	10	(0)
2012	Ukraine U18	5	(0)
2013	Ukraine U19	1	(0)
2014	Ukraine U20	1	(0)
2014–2015	Ukraine U21	10	(0)

Managerial career
- 2021–2022: Kryvbas Kryvyi Rih (assistant)
- 2023–2024: Fratria (assistant)
- 2024–: Pirin Blagoevgrad (assistant)
- * Club domestic league appearances and goals as of 22 June 2019

Artem Filimonov (Ukrainian: Артем Денисович Філімонов; born 21 February 1994) is a Ukrainian former professional football midfielder, who is now manager, working as assistant manager for Pirin Blagoevgrad.

He is a son of Ukrainian footballer Denys Filimonov.

== Career ==
Filimonov is product of youth team system of FC Dnipro. Made his debut for FC Chornomorets in the game against FC Illichivets Mariupol on 27 February 2015 in the Ukrainian Premier League.

On 21 June 2019, Filimonov joined Polish club Olimpia Grudziądz. However, already on 19 August 2019, the club announced that he had left the club again by mutual agreement.

In 2023 he became assistant manager of Fratria. On 5 February 2024, together with Babych, he moved to Bulgarian First League club Pirin Blagoevgrad.
