= Oleksandr Mashnin =

Ukrainian footballer

Personal information
- Full name: Oleksandr Valeriyovych Mashnin
- Date of birth: 20 March 1990 (age 36)
- Place of birth: Mykolaiv, Ukrainian SSR
- Height: 1.81 m (5 ft 11 1/2 in)
- Position: Midfielder

Youth career
- 2005–2006: SK Real Odesa

Senior career*
Years	Team	Apps	(Gls)
2012	Odesa	0	(0)
2015	Zhemchuzhyna Odesa	6	(0)
2016	Real Pharma Odesa	24	(6)
2017	Chornomorets Odesa	13	(0)
2019	Stomil Olsztyn	1	(0)
2019	Real Pharma Odesa	6	(0)
2020	Velykodolynske	1	(0)
2020–2022	BFSV Atlantik 97		
- * Club domestic league appearances and goals as of 00:04, 20 March 2024 (UTC)

Oleksandr Mashnin (Ukrainian: Олександр Валерійович Машнін; born 20 March 1990) is a Ukrainian professional footballer who plays as a midfielder.

== Career ==
Mashnin is a product of the SK Real Odesa youth sportive school.

He spent the start of his career in Ukrainian lower division clubs before signing a contract with Ukrainian Premier League side Chornomorets Odesa in February 2017. He made his league debut against Shakhtar Donetsk on 9 April 2017.
