= Jorge Elias (footballer) =

Brazilian footballer

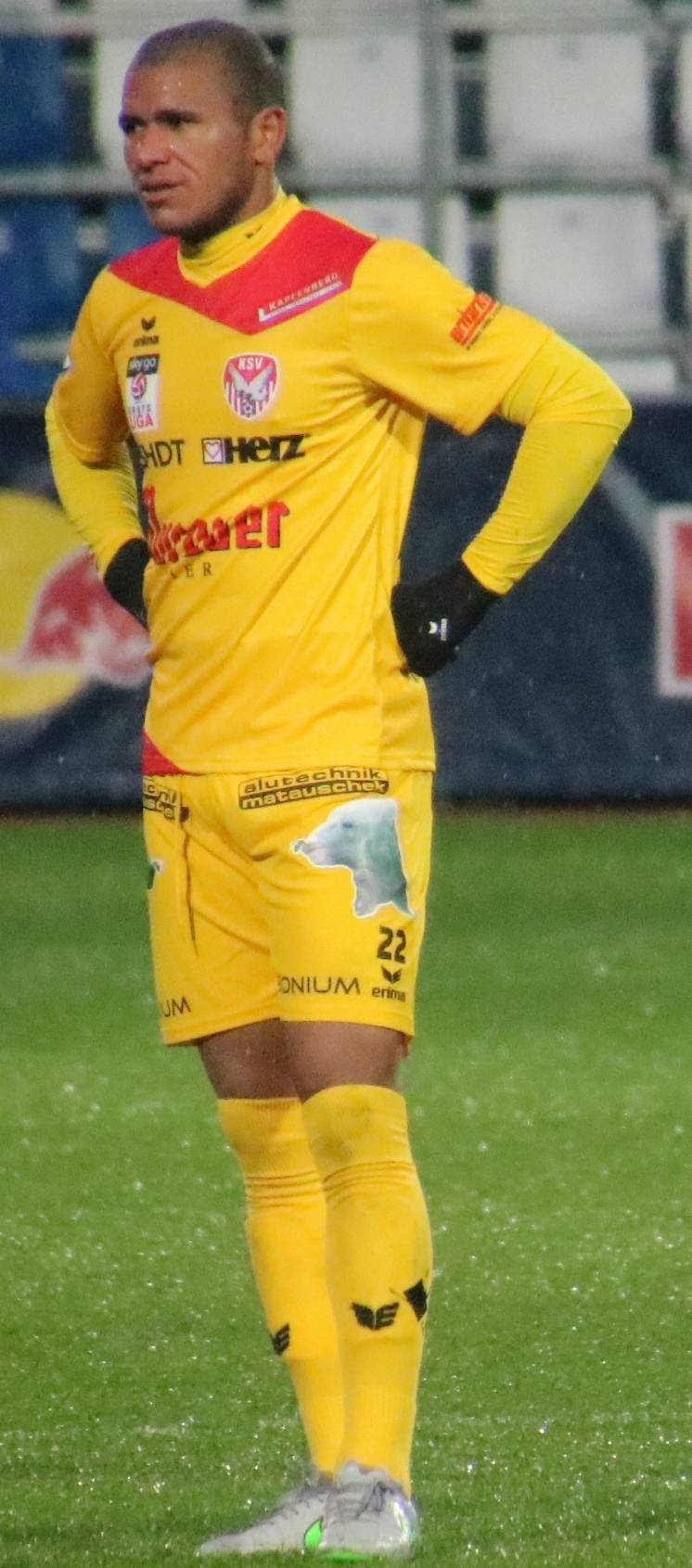

Personal information
- Full name: Jorge Elias dos Santos
- Date of birth: 6 June 1991 (age 35)
- Place of birth: Brazil
- Height: 1.80 m (5 ft 11 in)
- Position: Forward

Youth career
- 200?–2008: Rio Claro

Senior career*
Years	Team	Apps	(Gls)
2008–2012	Rio Claro	?	(?)
2012–2015	Mogi Mirim	3	(0)
2013	→ Icasa (loan)	7	(0)
2014	→ Arapongas (loan)	9	(1)
2015–2017	Kapfenberger SV	44	(21)
2017	→ Chornomorets Odesa (loan)	8	(1)
2017	Hibernians	13	(2)
2019	Inter de Limeira	0	(0)
2020–2021	Panevėžys	39	(15)
2022	Taraz	7	(1)
- * Club domestic league appearances and goals as of 23 January 2025

Jorge Elias dos Santos (born 6 June 1991) is a Brazilian footballer.

== Career ==
=== Club career ===
On 6 February 2020 it was confirmed, that Elias had joined FK Panevėžys in Lithuania.
