= Volodymyr Barilko =

Ukrainian footballer

Personal information
- Full name: Volodymyr Volodymyrovych Barilko
- Date of birth: 29 January 1994 (age 32)
- Place of birth: Kharkiv, Ukraine
- Height: 1.85 m (6 ft 1 in)
- Position: Striker

Youth career
- 2007–2011: Metalist Kharkiv

Senior career*
Years	Team	Apps	(Gls)
2011–2016	Metalist Kharkiv	1	(0)
2016	→ Chornomorets Odesa (loan)	7	(0)
2016–2017	Chornomorets Odesa	17	(1)
Total		25	(1)

International career^{‡}
2013	Ukraine U19	1	(0)
2014–2015	Ukraine U21	7	(1)
- * Club domestic league appearances and goals as of 12 December 2017 ‡ National team caps and goals as of 12 December 2017

Volodymyr Volodymyrovych Barilko (Ukrainian: Володимир Володимирович Барілко; born 29 January 1994) is a Ukrainian retired professional football striker.

== Career ==
Barilko is a product of the Metalist Kharkiv Youth School System. He is a younger brother of the Ukrainian footballer Serhiy Barylko.

He made his debut for FC Metalist in the match against FC Dynamo Kyiv on 1 March 2015 in the Ukrainian Premier League.

At the end of 2017 he announced about his retirement due to injury with no specification of which.

== Personal life ==
His brother, Serhiy Barilko, is also a professional footballer.
