= Petro Pereverza =

Ukrainian footballer

Personal information
- Full name: Petro Ivanovych Pereverza
- Date of birth: 10 July 1994 (age 32)
- Place of birth: Bahate, Odesa Oblast, Ukraine
- Height: 1.78 m (5 ft 10 in)
- Position: Striker

Youth career
- 2007–2009: UFK Kharkiv

Senior career*
Years	Team	Apps	(Gls)
2010–2014	Dunay Bahate		
2014–2017	Chornomorets Odesa	12	(0)
2016	→ Zhemchuzhyna Odesa (loan)	1	(0)
2017	Balkany Zorya	3	(0)
2018	Sumy	18	(0)
- * Club domestic league appearances and goals as of 20 March 2019

Petro Pereverza (Ukrainian: Петро Іванович Переверза; born 10 July 1994 in Bahate, Izmail Raion, Odesa Oblast, Ukraine) is a professional Ukrainian football striker.

== Career ==
Pereverza is a product of the youth team systems of UFK Kharkiv. He played in the amateur level until February 2014, when he signed a contract with FC Chornomorets. He made his debut for FC Chornomorets in a game against FC Metalurh Donetsk on 25 April 2015 in the Ukrainian Premier League.
