= Yevhen Borovyk =

Ukrainian footballer

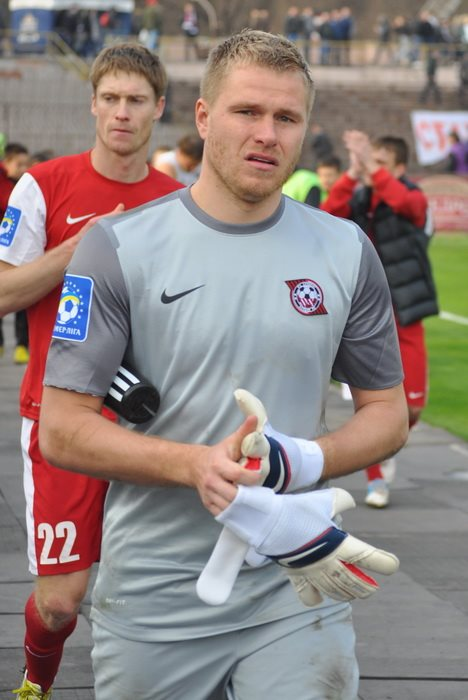

Personal information
- Full name: Yevhen Anatoliyovych Borovyk
- Date of birth: 2 March 1985 (age 41)
- Place of birth: Pryluky, Soviet Union (now Ukraine)
- Height: 1.84 m (6 ft 0 in)
- Position: Goalkeeper

Youth career
- 1999: RVUFK-2 Kyiv
- 1999–2002: RVUFK Kyiv

Senior career*
| Years | Team | Apps | (Gls) |
| 2003 | Torpedo-Metallurg | 0 | (0) |
| 2004 | Yevropa Pryluky (amateurs) | 1 | (0) |
| 2004–2005 | Nyva Vinnytsia | 31 | (0) |
| 2005–2006 | Metalist Kharkiv | 0 | (0) |
| 2007–2008 | Kryvbas Kryvyi Rih | 27 | (0) |
| 2009–2013 | Dnipro Dnipropetrovsk | 24 | (0) |
| 2010–2011 | → Kryvbas Kryvyi Rih (loan) | 23 | (1) |
| 2011–2013 | → Arsenal Kyiv (loan) | 19 | (0) |
| 2013 | Kryvbas Kryvyi Rih | 11 | (0) |
| 2013 | Arsenal Kyiv | 7 | (0) |
| 2014 | Metalurh Zaporizhzhia | 16 | (0) |
| 2015–2016 | Chornomorets Odesa | 35 | (0) |
| 2017 | Karpaty Lviv | 14 | (0) |
| 2017 | Cherno More Varna | 3 | (0) |
| 2018 | Akzhayik | 22 | (0) |
| 2019 | Obolon-Brovar Kyiv | 2 | (0) |
| Total | | 235 | (1) |

Managerial career
- 2020–2021: Chornomorets Odesa (goalkeeping coach)
- * Club domestic league appearances and goals as of 27 November 2019

Yevhen Anatoliyovych Borovyk (Ukrainian: Євген Боровик; born 2 March 1985) is a Ukrainian retired professional footballer who played as a goalkeeper.

== Career ==
He joined Kryvbas from Metalist in 2007. Borovyk also played 1 game for the Ukrainian Olympic team.

On 15 August 2017, Borovyk signed with Bulgarian club Cherno More Varna. On 8 September 2017, he made his debut in a 0–2 away defeat by Beroe. On 7 October 2017, Borovyk suffered an ankle fracture during training and was going on to be sidelined until the end of the year. On 6 December, his contract was terminated by mutual consent. On 19 February 2018, Borovyk signed with Kazakhstan Premier League club Akzhayik.

=== Coaching career ===
In May 2020, he became a goalkeeping coach at the headquarters of Chornomorets head coach Serhiy Kovalets.
