= Navid Nasimi =

Ukrainian footballer (born 1995)

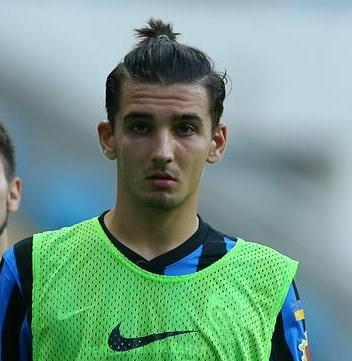

Personal information
- Full name: Navid Daudovych Nasimi
- Date of birth: 1 March 1995 (age 31)
- Place of birth: Kyiv, Ukraine
- Height: 1.78 m (5 ft 10 in)
- Position: Left back

Team information
- Current team: Chaika
- Number: 14

Youth career
- 2010–2011: Lider Petropavlivska Borschahivka

Senior career*
Years	Team	Apps	(Gls)
2013–2016	Chornomorets Odesa	7	(0)
2016	→ Hirnyk-Sport Komsomolsk (loan)	4	(0)
2016–2018	Arsenal Kyiv	32	(2)
2018–	Chaika	14	(0)
- * Club domestic league appearances and goals as of 3 July 2019

Navid Nasimi (Ukrainian: Навід Даудович Насімі Persian: نوید نسیمی; born 1 March 1995) is a Ukrainian footballer who plays for Chaika.

== Career ==
Nasimi is a product of the youth team systems of FC Lider Petropavlivska Borschahivka. He played at the amateur level until March 2013, when he signed a contract with FC Chornomorets Odesa.

He made his debut for FC Chornomorets Odesa in a game against FC Olimpik Donetsk on 18 July 2015 in the Ukrainian Premier League.

== Career statistics ==
As of 3 July 2019

Club	Division	Season	League		Cup		Continental		Total	
Club	Division	Season	Apps	Goals	Apps	Goals	Apps	Goals	Apps	Goals
Chornomorets Odesa	UPL	2015–16	7	0	3	0	—		10	0
Hirnyk-Sport	Persha Liha	2015–16	4	0	0	0	—		4	0
Arsenal Kyiv	Persha Liha	2016-17	15	2	1	0	—		16	2
Arsenal Kyiv	Persha Liha	2017-18	17	0	2	1	—		19	1
Arsenal Kyiv	Total		32	2	3	1	—		35	3
Chaika	Druha Liha	2018–19	14	0	0	0	—		14	0
Career total			57	2	6	1	—		63	3
