= Yevhen Murashov =

Ukrainian footballer (born 1995)

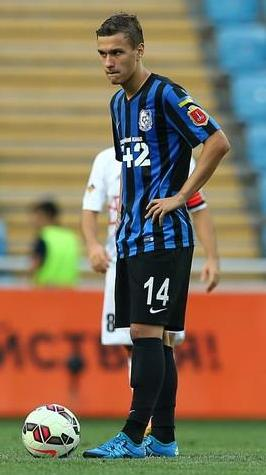
- Murashov in 2015

Personal information
- Full name: Yevhen Ihorovych Murashov
- Date of birth: 9 May 1995 (age 31)
- Place of birth: Ukraine
- Height: 1.78 m (5 ft 10 in)
- Position: Forward

Youth career
- 2008–2011: Kremin Kremenchuk
- 2011–2012: Shakhtar Donetsk

Senior career*
Years	Team	Apps	(Gls)
2012–2013	Shakhtar Donetsk	0	(0)
2013–2017	Chornomorets Odesa	19	(1)
2016	→ Guria Lanchkhuti (loan)	8	(3)
2017	Zhemchuzhyna Odesa	11	(0)
2018	Sumy	11	(0)
2018–2021	Kremin Kremenchuk	72	(7)
- * Club domestic league appearances and goals as of 1 December 2021

Yevhen Ihorovych Murashov (Ukrainian: Євген Ігорович Мурашов; born 9 May 1995) is a professional Ukrainian football striker.

== Career ==
Murashov is a product of the youth team systems of FC Kremin and FC Shakhtar. In July 2013, he signed a contract with FC Chornomorets and made his debut for FC Chornomorets in a game against FC Dnipro Dnipropetrovsk on 3 May 2015 in the Ukrainian Premier League.
