= Sergey Smorodin =

Uzbekistani footballer (born 1994)

Personal information
- Full name: Sergey Smorodin
- Date of birth: February 15, 1994 (age 32)
- Place of birth: Tashkent, Uzbekistan
- Height: 1.86 m (6 ft 1 in)
- Position: Goalkeeper

Youth career
- 2004–2012: Pakhtakor Tashkent

Senior career*
Years	Team	Apps	(Gls)
2012–2014	Pakhtakor Tashkent	0	(0)
2012	→ Pakhtakor-2	?	(?)
2014	→ Andijon (loan)	20	(0)
2015–2016	Neftchi Fergana	17	(0)
2017	Chornomorets Odesa	1	(0)
2018–2019	Club Green Streets	22	(0)
2019	Chornomorets Odesa	0	(0)
2020–2021	Kryvbas-2 Kryvyi Rih	4	(0)

International career^{‡}
	Uzbekistan U16	?	(?)
2011	Uzbekistan U17	6	(0)
	Uzbekistan U19	3	(0)
	Uzbekistan U20	2	(0)
	Uzbekistan U23	2	(0)
- * Club domestic league appearances and goals as of 8 February 2018 ‡ National team caps and goals as of 8 February 2018

Sergey Smorodin (Uzbek: Sergey Smorodin; born 15 February 1994) is an Uzbekistani former professional footballer who played as goalkeeper.

== Career ==
Smorodin is a product of Pakhtakor Tashkent's youth academy. He went on loan to FK Andijon and made his debut in the Uzbek League on 7 November 2014 in a match against FC Neftchi Fergana.

In February 2017 he signed a contract with the Ukrainian Premier League team FC Chernomorets.
