= Mateus Mendes =

Brazilian footballer

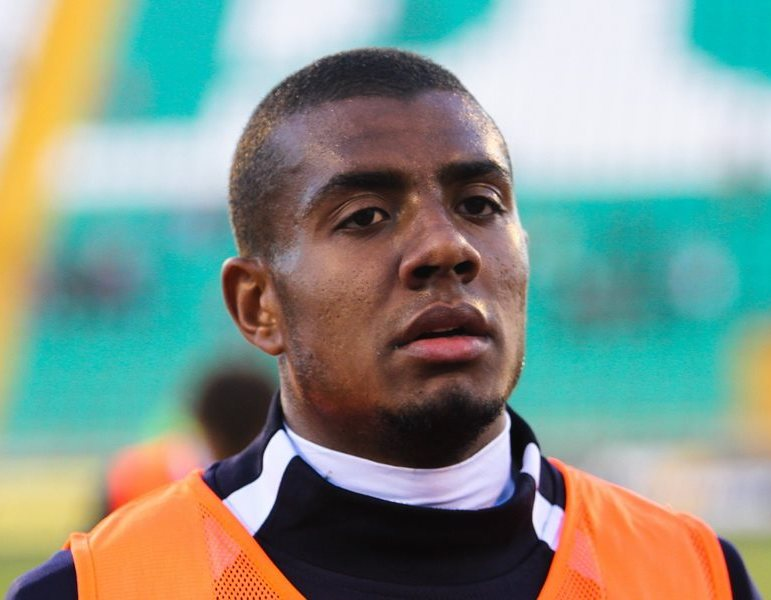

Personal information
- Full name: Mateus Mendes Ferreira Pires
- Date of birth: 22 January 1992 (age 34)
- Place of birth: Rio Claro, Brazil
- Height: 1.83 m (6 ft 0 in)
- Position: Left-back

Team information
- Current team: Azuriz

Youth career
- Corinthians

Senior career*
Years	Team	Apps	(Gls)
201?	Avaí		
201?–2015	Velo Clube		
2013	→ Internacional Limeira		
2013	→ Independente		
2014	→ Internacional Limeira		
2015	São Carlos		
2016	Chornomorets Odesa	5	(0)
2017	Rio Claro	11	(0)
2017	Velo Clube	10	(1)
2018	Patrocinense	5	(0)
2018	Salgueiro	2	(0)
2018	Rio Claro	9	(0)
2019	Moto Clob	18	(1)
2019	Lajeadense	6	(1)
2020	Brasil de Pelotas	19	(0)
2021–	Azuriz	5	(0)
- * Club domestic league appearances and goals as of 19:40, 20 February 2020 (UTC)

Mateus Mendes Ferreira Pires (born 22 January 1992), commonly known as Mateus Mendes, is a Brazilian professional footballer who plays as a left-back for Azuriz.

== Career ==
In February 2016 he signed a contract with the Ukrainian Premier League FC Chornomorets.
