= Danylo Kanevtsev =

Ukrainian footballer

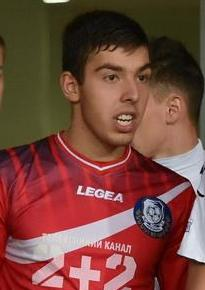

Personal information
- Full name: Danylo Dmytrovych Kanevtsev
- Date of birth: 26 July 1996 (age 30)
- Place of birth: Kharkiv, Ukraine
- Height: 1.87 m (6 ft 2 in)
- Position: Goalkeeper

Team information
- Current team: Bukovyna Chernivtsi
- Number: 30

Youth career
- 2009–2012: Metalist Kharkiv

Senior career*
Years	Team	Apps	(Gls)
2012–2016	Metalist Kharkiv	2	(0)
2016–2017	Chornomorets Odesa	8	(0)
2017	Metalist 1925 Kharkiv	9	(0)
2018–2020	Vorskla Poltava	1	(0)
2018–2019	→ Metalist 1925 Kharkiv (loan)	20	(0)
2020–2022	Metalist Kharkiv	15	(0)
2022	Dila Gori	26	(0)
2024–	Bukovyna Chernivtsi	34	(0)

International career^{‡}
2013	Ukraine U17	1	(0)
2017–2018	Ukraine U21	5	(0)
- * Club domestic league appearances and goals as of 3 June 2026 ‡ National team caps and goals as of 11 October 2021

Danylo Dmytrovych Kanevtsev (Ukrainian: Данило Дмитрович Каневцев; born 26 July 1996) is a Ukrainian professional footballer who plays as a goalkeeper for Bukovyna Chernivtsi.

== Career ==
Kanevtsev was born in Kharkiv and is a product of the FC Metalist Kharkiv youth sportive system.

He spent his career in the Ukrainian Premier League Reserves club FC Metalist. And in February 2016 Kanevtsev was promoted to the Ukrainian Premier League's squad. He made his debut for Metalist Kharkiv in the Ukrainian Premier League in a match against FC Volyn Lutsk on 6 March 2016.
