= Sheriff Isa =

Nigerian footballer

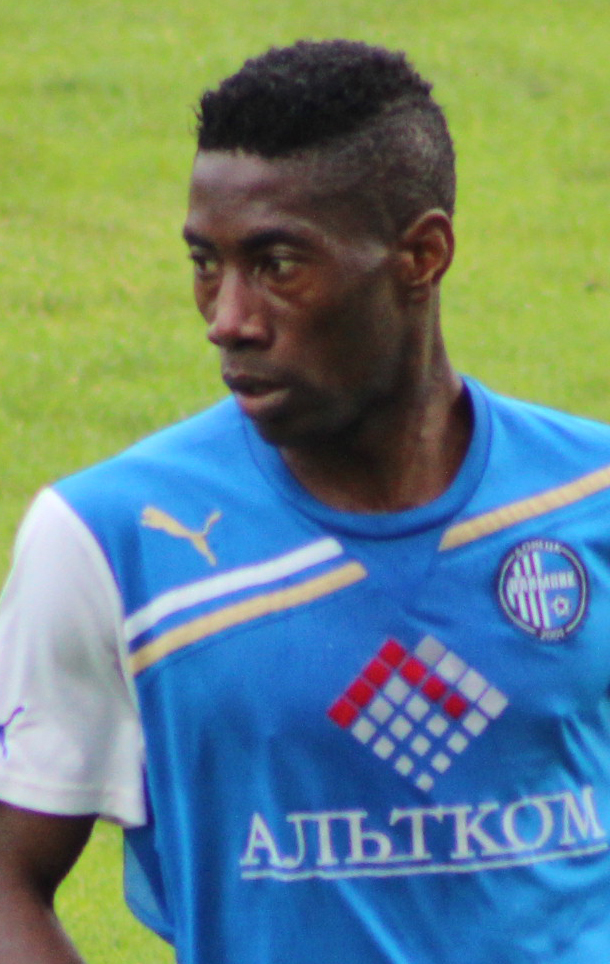
- Sheriff Isa in 2014

Personal information
- Full name: Sheriff Isa
- Date of birth: 10 November 1990 (age 35)
- Place of birth: Sokoto, Nigeria
- Height: 1.82 m (5 ft 11 1/2 in)
- Position: Midfielder

Youth career
- 2005: Sultan Atiku Secondary School Team
- 2008–2009: Crystal Soccer Academy

Senior career*
Years	Team	Apps	(Gls)
2009–2012	Kano Pillars	67	(18)
2012–2015	Olimpik Donetsk	82	(14)
2016	Chornomorets Odesa	1	(0)

International career^{‡}
2007–2009	Nigeria U17	6	(3)
2009	Nigeria U20	1	(0)
- * Club domestic league appearances and goals as of 15 December 2016 ‡ National team caps and goals as of 15 December 2016

Sheriff Isa (born 10 November 1990) is a Nigerian professional footballer who played as a midfielder.

== Career ==
Isa started his career when he signed for Kano Pillars FC before the 2009-2010 season. He was fairly regular and a consistent performer during his first season in the Nigeria Premier League. Then he made a very promising start to the ongoing Nigeria Premier League 2010-2011, scoring two goals during the first 16 rounds of football. In July 2012 he signed a contract with Ukrainian club FC Olimpik.

Isa was a member of the Nigeria national under-17 football team and winner of the 2007 FIFA U-17 World Cup in South Korea.

== Honours ==
- FIFA U-17 World Cup: 2007
