= 2016–17 FC Olimpik Donetsk season =

Olimpik Donetsk
2016–17 season
- President: Vladyslav Helzin
- Manager: Roman Sanzhar
- Stadium: Yuvileiny Stadium, Sumy; Dynamo Stadium, Kyiv
- Ukrainian Premier League: 4th
- Ukrainian Cup: Round of 20 (1/16)
- Top goalscorer: League: Anton Postupalenko (7); All: Anton Postupalenko (7)

The 2016–17 season was third consecutive season in the top Ukrainian football league for Olimpik Donetsk. Olimpik competed in Premier League and in the Ukrainian Cup. Finishing 4th in Premiek League Olimpik qualified to Europa League third qualifying round for next season which would be the first participation in European club competition in club history.

== Players ==
=== Squad information ===
Squad no.	Name	Nationality	Position	Date of birth (age)
Goalkeepers
1	Zauri Makharadze	(Ukraine)	GK	24 March 1993 (aged 24)
31	Yaroslav Kotlyarov	(Ukraine)	GK	19 November 1997 (aged 19)
Defenders
3	Temur Partsvania	(Ukraine)	DF	6 July 1991 (aged 25)
4	Dmytro Hryshko (Captain)	(Ukraine)	DF	2 December 1985 (aged 31)
9	Vitaliy Hoshkoderya	(Ukraine)	DF	8 January 1988 (aged 29)
13	Vadym Schastlyvtsev ^{List B}	(Ukraine)	DF	18 April 1998 (aged 19)
23	Dmytro Nyemchaninov	(Ukraine)	DF	27 January 1990 (aged 27)
24	Vitaliy Fedoriv	(Ukraine)	DF	21 October 1987 (aged 29)
32	Vladis-Emmerson Illoy-Ayyet	(Ukraine)	DF	7 October 1995 (aged 21)
33	Yaroslav Oliynyk	(Ukraine)	DF	4 March 1991 (aged 26)
44	Yevhen Tsymbalyuk	(Ukraine)	DF	19 June 1996 (aged 21)
89	Artem Kozlov ^{List B}	(Ukraine)	DF	10 February 1997 (aged 20)
Midfielders
8	Volodymyr Doronin	(Ukraine)	MF	15 January 1993 (aged 24)
14	Anton Postupalenko	(Ukraine)	MF	28 August 1988 (aged 28)
15	Vitaliy Hemeha	(Ukraine)	MF	10 January 1994 (aged 23)
17	Serhiy Shestakov	(Ukraine)	MF	12 April 1990 (aged 27)
20	Ivan Matyazh	(Ukraine)	MF	15 February 1988 (aged 29)
25	Ihor Zhurakhovskyi	(Ukraine)	MF	19 September 1994 (aged 22)
27	Ivan Brikner	(Ukraine)	MF	30 June 1993 (aged 24)
45	Vladyslav Khomutov ^{List B}	(Ukraine)	MF	4 June 1998 (aged 19)
90	Andriy Bohdanov	(Ukraine)	MF	21 January 1990 (aged 27)
94	Serhiy Hryn (on loan from Shakhtar Donetsk)	(Ukraine)	MF	6 June 1994 (aged 23)
Forwards
7	Mykhaylo Serhiychuk	(Ukraine)	FW	29 July 1991 (aged 25)
11	Moha Rharsalla	(Morocco) (Spain)	FW	15 September 1993 (aged 23)
22	Stanislav Bilenkyi ^{List B}	(Ukraine)	FW	22 August 1998 (aged 18)

== Transfers ==
=== In ===
Date	Pos.	Player	Age	Moving from	Type	Fee	Source
Summer
18 July 2016	DF	(Ukraine) Yaroslav Oliynyk	25	(Ukraine) Illichivets Mariupol	Transfer	Undisclosed	
18 July 2016	MF	(Ukraine) Vitaliy Kvashuk	23	(Belarus) Torpedo-BelAZ Zhodino	Transfer	Undisclosed	
21 July 2016	DF	(Ukraine) Artem Baranovskyi	26	(Ukraine) Stal Kamianske	Transfer	Undisclosed	
21 July 2016	MF	(Ukraine) Illya Kornyev	19	(Ukraine) Metalist Kharkiv	Transfer	Free	
18 August 2016	MF	(Ukraine) Andriy Bohdanov	26	(Ukraine) Volyn Lutsk	Transfer	Undisclosed	
31 August 2016	MF	(Ukraine) Serhiy Hryn	22	(Ukraine) Shakhtar Donetsk	Loan		
Winter
1 December 2016	MF	(Ukraine) Yehor Demchenko	19	Unattached	Transfer	Free	
29 January 2017	MF	(Ukraine) Ivan Brikner	23	(Ukraine) PFC Sumy	Transfer	Undisclosed	
7 February 2017	DF	(Ukraine) Yevhen Zakharchenko	20	(Germany) Anker Wismar	Transfer	Undisclosed	
16 February 2017	FW	(Ukraine) Mykhaylo Serhiychuk	25	(Ukraine) Veres Rivne	Transfer	Undisclosed	
2 March 2017	MF	(Ukraine) Vitaliy Hemeha	23	(Ukraine) Dynamo Kyiv	Transfer	Free	
15 March 2017	MF	(Ukraine) Ihor Zhurakhovskyi	22	(Russia) Kuban Krasnodar	Transfer	Free	
1 January 2017	FW	(Morocco) Moha Rharsalla	23	(Spain) Gimnàstic Tarragona	Loan return		

=== Out ===
Date	Pos.	Player	Age	Moving to	Type	Fee	Source
Summer
7 June 2016	FW	(Ukraine) Ruslan Stepanyuk	24	(Ukraine) Veres Rivne	Transfer	Undisclosed	
19 June 2016	DF	(Ukraine) Serhiy Borzenko	30	(Ukraine) Veres Rivne	Transfer	Undisclosed	
7 July 2016	MF	(Ukraine) Dmytro Bashlay	26	(Ukraine) Obolon-Brovar	Transfer	Undisclosed	
15 July 2016	MF	(Ukraine) Valeriy Lebed	27	Unattached	Transfer	Free	
15 July 2016	MF	(Ukraine) Oleksandr Volkov	27	(Ukraine) Desna Chernihiv	Transfer	Undisclosed	
15 July 2016	FW	(Ukraine) Denys Halenkov	20	(Ukraine) Desna Chernihiv	Transfer	Undisclosed	
25 July 2016	DF	(Guinea) Sékou Condé	23	(Russia) Amkar Perm	Transfer	Undisclosed	
29 July 2016	MF	(Ukraine) Vladyslav Ohirya	26	(Ukraine) FC Oleksandriya	Transfer	Undisclosed	
16 August 2016	GK	(Ukraine) Serhiy Litovchenko	29	(Georgia (country)) FC Zugdidi	Transfer	Undisclosed	
18 September 2016	MF	(Ukraine) Vitaliy Kvashuk	23	Unattached	Transfer	Free	
20 July 2016	FW	(Morocco) Moha Rharsalla	23	(Spain) Gimnàstic Tarragona	Loan		
Winter
1 January 2017	FW	(Ukraine) Illya Kornyev	20	Unattached	Transfer	Free	
5 January 2017	MF	(Ukraine) Kyrylo Petrov	26	(Azerbaijan) Neftchi Baku	Transfer	Free	
27 January 2017	MF	(Ukraine) Volodymyr Tanchyk	25	(Hungary) Gyirmót SE	Transfer	Free	
31 January 2017	DF	(Ukraine) Oleksandr Varvanin	19	(Belarus) Krumkachy Minsk	Transfer	Undisclosed	
10 February 2017	FW	(Ukraine) Volodymyr Lysenko	28	(Ukraine) Desna Chernihiv	Transfer	Free	
21 February 2017	MF	(Ukraine) Maksym Drachenko	26	(Ukraine) Zirka Kropyvnytskyi	Transfer	Free	
5 March 2017	DF	(Ukraine) Artem Baranovskyi	26	(Tajikistan) Istiklol	Transfer	Free	
10 March 2017	MF	(Ukraine) Yehor Demchenko	19	(Ukraine) Avanhard Kramatorsk	Transfer	Free	

== Pre-season and friendlies ==
22 June 2016 Friendly	FC Oleksandriya (Ukraine)	1–0	(Ukraine) Olimpik Donetsk	Oleksandriya
17:00 EEST (UTC+03:00)	23'	Report		Stadium: CSC Nika; Attendance: 50; Referee: Andriy Skrypka

25 June 2016 Friendly	Dynamo Kyiv (Ukraine)	1–0	(Ukraine) Olimpik Donetsk	Kyiv
18:00 EEST (UTC+03:00)	Teodorczyk 90'	Report		Stadium: Dynamo Training Center; Attendance: 100; Referee: Ivan Bondar

28 June 2016 Friendly	FC Obukhiv (Ukraine)	0–4	(Ukraine) Olimpik Donetsk	Obukhiv
19:00 EEST (UTC+03:00)		Report	Kharatin 36'; Tanchyk 51'; Lysenko 63'; Hoshkoderya 83'	Stadium: Melnik Stadium; Attendance: 100; Referee: Dmytro Dudka

5 July 2016 Friendly	Shakhtar Donetsk U-21 (Ukraine)	0–0	(Ukraine) Olimpik Donetsk	Shchaslyve
17:00 EEST (UTC+03:00)		Report		Stadium: Knyazha Arena; Attendance: 80; Referee: Andriy Libster

7 July 2016 Friendly	Olimpik Donetsk (Ukraine)	1–2	(Ukraine) Cherkaskyi Dnipro	Boryspil
17:00 EEST (UTC+03:00)	Tanchyk 35'	Report	Bushman 73' (pen.), 77'	Stadium: Kolos Stadium; Attendance: 100; Referee: Mykhayo Rodionenko

12 July 2016 Friendly	Obolon-Brovar Kyiv (Ukraine)	1–1	(Ukraine) Olimpik Donetsk	Bucha
17:30 EEST (UTC+03:00)	Zakharevych 25'	Report	Matyazh 14' (pen.)	Stadium: Obolon Train Base; Attendance: 50; Referee: Ivan Bondar

13 July 2016 Friendly	Kolos Kovalivka (Ukraine)	0–1	(Ukraine) Olimpik Donetsk	Mala Soltanovka
18:00 EEST (UTC+03:00)		Report	Shestakov 67'	Stadium: Saltik Stadium; Attendance: 100; Referee: Olena Kvasha

17 July 2016 Friendly	Cherkaskyi Dnipro (Ukraine)	2–2	(Ukraine) Olimpik Donetsk	Cherkasy
18:00 EEST (UTC+03:00)	Bushman 20' (31)	Report	Matyazh 12'; Tanchyk 62'	Stadium: Tsentralnyi Stadion; Attendance: 100; Referee: Yuriy Foschiy

8 October 2016 Friendly	Dynamo Kyiv (Ukraine)	3–3	(Ukraine) Olimpik Donetsk	Kyiv
13:00 EEST (UTC+03:00)	Ochigava 45'; Harmash 67'; Danilo Silva 83'	Report	Lysenko 2' (pen.), 29', 35'	Stadium: Lobanovskyi Dynamo Stadium; Attendance: 500; Referee: Yevhen Aranovsky

11 November 2016 Friendly	Shakhtar Donetsk U-21 (Ukraine)	1–4	(Ukraine) Olimpik Donetsk	Shchaslyve
12:00 EET (UTC+02:00)	Mihunov 88'	Report	Lysenko 8'; Khomutov 29'; Tanchyk 73'; Matyazh 81' (pen.)	Stadium: Shakhtar training ground Attendance: 50

18 January 2017 Makarov memorial	Olimpik Donetsk (Ukraine)	4–2	(Ukraine) Juniors Shpytki	Kyiv
12:00 EET (UTC+02:00)	Palagniuk 33'; Doronin 41' (pen.); Nyemchaninov 54'; Shestakov 66'	Report	Marinchuk 62'; Serhiy Shut 77'	Stadium: Dynamo Training Center; Referee: Oleksandr Sahno

20 January 2017 Makarov memorial	Olimpik Donetsk (Ukraine)	1–0	(Ukraine) Metalurh Zaporizhya	Kyiv
12:00 EET (UTC+02:00)	Matyazh 65'	Report		Stadium: Dynamo Training Center; Referee: Serhiy Zadyran

21 January 2017 Makarov memorial	Stal Kamianske U-21 (Ukraine)	2–1	(Ukraine) Olimpik Donetsk	Kyiv
12:00 EET (UTC+02:00)	Hryshko 15' (o.g.); Kostenko 39'	Report	Shestakov 18'	Stadium: Dynamo Training Center; Referee: Oleksandr Sahno

23 January 2017 Makarov memorial	Olimpik Donetsk (Ukraine)	2–2	(Ukraine) Kolos Kovalivka	Kyiv
12:00 EET (UTC+02:00)	Emmerson 39'; Shestakov 85'	Report	Pozdyeiev 45+1'; Lysytskyi 55'	Stadium: Dynamo Training Center; Referee: Vladyslav Stoliarenko

4 February 2017 Friendly	Olimpik Donetsk (Ukraine)	2–1	(North Macedonia) FK Rabotnički	Antalya, Turkey
14:00 EET (UTC+02:00)	Brikner 60'; Kozlov 90'	Report	89'	Stadium: Miracle sport complex

7 February 2017 Friendly	Olimpik Donetsk (Ukraine)	7–0	(Turkey) Mersin İdmanyurdu	Antalya, Turkey
18:00 EET (UTC+02:00)	Serhiychuk 14'; Postupalenko 15', 29'; Khomutov 22'; Matyazh 65', 89'; Yermachenko 79'	Report		Stadium: Miracle sport complex

8 February 2017 Friendly	Olimpik Donetsk (Ukraine)	3–3	(Kosovo) KF Trepça'89	Antalya, Turkey
16:30 EET (UTC+02:00)	Bohdanov 22'; Moha 27'; Matyazh 42'	Report	75'; 86' (pen.); 90'	Stadium: Kremlin palace stadium

11 February 2017 Friendly	Shakhtar Donetsk U-21 (Ukraine)	1–2	(Ukraine) Olimpik Donetsk	Belek, Turkey
16:30 EET (UTC+02:00)	Arendaruk 13'	Report	Postupalenko 4'; Nyemchaninov 55'	Stadium: Papilon sports

14 February 2017 Friendly	Olimpik Donetsk (Ukraine)	0–0	(Kazakhstan) Kaysar Kyzylorda	Antalya, Turkey
16:00 EET (UTC+02:00)		Report

17 February 2017 Friendly	Olimpik Donetsk (Ukraine)	0–1	(Georgia (country)) Dinamo Tbilisi	Antalya, Turkey
14:00 EET (UTC+02:00)		Report	Mikeltadze 49'

== Competitions ==
=== Overall ===
Competition	Started round	Final position	First match	Last match
Premier League	Matchday 1	4th	24 July 2016	31 May 2017
Cup	Round of 20	Round of 20	21 September 2016	21 September 2016

=== Premier League ===
==== League table ====
Pos	Team	Pld	W	D	L	GF	GA	GD	Pts	Qualification or relegation
1	Shakhtar Donetsk (C)	32	25	5	2	66	24	+42	80	Qualification for the Champions League group stage
2	Dynamo Kyiv	32	21	4	7	69	33	+36	67	Qualification for the Champions League third qualifying round
3	Zorya Luhansk	32	16	6	10	45	31	+14	54	Qualification for the Europa League group stage (Note: Since winners of 2016–17 Ukrainian Cup, Shakhtar Donetsk, qualified for European competition based on their league position, the spot awarded to the cup winner (Europa League group stage) was passed to the third-placed team and the spot for the third-placed team (Europa League third qualifying round) was passed to the fifth-placed team.)
4	Olimpik Donetsk	32	11	11	10	33	44	−11	44	Qualification for the Europa League third qualifying round
5	FC Oleksandriya	32	10	10	12	41	43	−2	40	Qualification for the Europa League third qualifying round
6	Chornomorets Odesa	32	10	8	14	25	37	−12	38	

Source: UEFA, Ukrainian Premier League, Soccerway
Rules for classification: 1) Points; 2) Goal difference; 3) Goals scored; 4) Head-to-head points; 5) Head-to-head goal difference; 6) Head-to-head goals scored; 7) Draw.
(C) Champions

==== Results summary ====
Overall								Home						Away					
Pld	W	D	L	GF	GA	GD	Pts	W	D	L	GF	GA	GD	W	D	L	GF	GA	GD
32	11	11	10	33	43	−10	44	7	5	4	18	20	−2	4	6	6	15	23	−8

Last updated: 31 May 2017.
Source: Competitive matches

==== Results by round ====
Round	1	2	3	4	5	6	7	8	9	10	11	12	13	14	15	16	17	18	19	20	21	22	23	24	25	26	27	28	29	30	31	32
Ground	H	H	A	H	A	H	A	H	A	H	A	A	A	H	A	H	A	A	H	A	H	A	A	A	H	A	H	H	H	A	H	A
Result	L	D	W	L	L	W	W	W	L	W	D	L	W	W	W	W	D	D	D	L	W	D	D	L	L	L	D	W	W	D	D	L
Position	8	8	6	7	9	8	6	4	6	6	6	6	5	4	4	4	4	5	5	5	5	5	4	4	4	6	6	4	4	4	4	4

Updated to match(es) played on 31 May 2017. Source: Competitive matches
A = Away; H = Home; W = Win; D = Draw; L = Loss

==== Matches ====
24 July 2016 1	Zorya Luhansk	3–0	Olimpik Donetsk	Zaporizhia
17:00 EEST (UTC+03:00)	Bonaventure 19', (yellow card) 19'; Ljubenović 26'; Hrechyshkin (yellow card) 61'; Tkachuk (yellow card) 65', (goal) 90'	Report	Drachenko (yellow card) 64'	Stadium: Slavutych-Arena; Attendance: 1,300; Referee: Kateryna Monzul

30 July 2016 2	Volyn Lutsk	2–2	Olimpik Donetsk	Lutsk
17:00 EEST (UTC+03:00)	Khomchenko 19'; Goropevšek (yellow card) 28'; Herasymyuk 57'; Shapoval (yellow card) 63'; Chepelyuk (yellow card) 90+4'	Report	Partsvania (yellow card) 6'; Postupalenko 72', (yellow card) 90+5'; Petrov 90+6', (yellow card) 90+6'	Stadium: Avanhard Stadium; Attendance: 3,400; Referee: Yuriy Hryso

7 August 2016 3	Olimpik Donetsk	4–2	Zirka Kropyvnytskyi	Kropyvnytskyi
17:00 EEST (UTC+03:00)	Oliynyk (yellow card) 11'; Shestakov (yellow card) 45+1', (goal) 59'; Matyazh 53'; Postupalenko 73', (yellow card) 73'; Kornyev 87'	Report	Popov (yellow card) 28'; Lupashko 69'; Zahalskyi 90+3'	Stadium: Zirka Stadium; Attendance: 3,988; Referee: Dmytro Kutakov

14 August 2016 4	Chornomorets Odesa	3–0	Olimpik Donetsk	Odesa
17:00 EEST (UTC+03:00)	Martynenko 17', 36', (yellow card) 90+1'; Filimonov (yellow card) 32'; Khoblenko (yellow card) 37'; Barilko 90+3'	Report	Petrov (yellow card) 86'	Stadium: Chornomorets Stadium; Attendance: 5,200; Referee: Ivan Bondar

20 August 2016 5	Olimpik Donetsk	0–2	FC Oleksandriya	Sumy
17:00 EEST (UTC+03:00)	Lysenko (yellow card) 31'; Khomutov (yellow card) 38'; Nyemchaninov (yellow card) 45'; Baranovskyi (yellow card) 47'	Report	Chorniy 28', (yellow card) 28'; Hrytsuk (yellow card) 58'; Zaporozhan (yellow card) 66', (goal) 78' (pen.); Hitchenko (yellow card) 67'	Stadium: Yuvileiny Stadium; Attendance: 1,920; Referee: Yaroslav Kozyk

28 August 2016 6	Karpaty Lviv	0–2	Olimpik Donetsk	Lviv
17:00 EEST (UTC+03:00)	Kravets (yellow card) 13'; Rudyka (yellow card) 45+1'; Ksyonz (yellow card) 54'	Report	Tkachuk (yellow card) 21'; Lysenko 26', 68', (yellow card) 47'; Shestakov (yellow card) 51'; Petrov (yellow card) 75'	Stadium: Arena Lviv; Attendance: 3,244; Referee: Dmytro Kutakov

11 September 2016 7	Olimpik Donetsk	3–0	Dnipro	Sumy
19:30 EEST (UTC+03:00)	Bohdanov 10', 21', 50', (yellow card) 16'	Report	Adamyuk (yellow card) 19'; Bokhashvili (yellow card) 66'	Stadium: Yuvileiny Stadium; Attendance: 7,125; Referee: Oleksandr Derdo

17 September 2016 8	Stal Kamianske	2–3	Olimpik Donetsk	Dnipro
14:00 EEST (UTC+03:00)	Stamenković (yellow card) 10'; Pashayev (yellow card) 58'; Comvalius (yellow card) 63', (goal) 90+3' (pen.); Karasyuk 70'; Kalenchuk (yellow card) 80'	Report	Postupalenko (yellow card) (yellow-red card) 6', (goal) 35'; Bohdanov 60'; Hryn 73'; Makharadze (yellow card) 90+2'	Stadium: Meteor Stadium; Attendance: 570; Referee: Mykola Balakin

24 September 2016 9	Olimpik Donetsk	0–4	Dynamo Kyiv	Sumy
14:00 EEST (UTC+03:00)		Report	Tsyhankov 9'; Moraes 26'; Fedorchuk (yellow card) 46', (goal) 78'; Morozyuk (yellow card) 58'; González 59'	Stadium: Yuvileiny Stadium; Attendance: 13,850; Referee: Anatoliy Zhabchenko

1 October 2016 10	Vorskla Poltava	1–2	Olimpik Donetsk	Poltava
19:30 EEST (UTC+03:00)	Holodyuk (yellow card) 24'; Chesnakov 45', (yellow card) 72'; Kobakhidze (yellow card) 47'; Perduta (yellow card) 76'; Siminin (yellow card) 77'; Bartulović (yellow card) 90+1'; Sklyar (yellow card) 90+2'	Report	Doronin (yellow card) 12'; Tanchyk (yellow card) 31'; Hryn 40'; Shestakov 83'; Hoshkoderya (yellow card) 85'; Baranovskyi (yellow card) 90+4'; Khomutov (yellow card) 90+5'	Stadium: Vorskla Stadium; Attendance: 2,500; Referee: Oleksandr Derdo

15 October 2016 11	Olimpik Donetsk	1–1	Shakhtar Donetsk	Sumy
17:00 EEST (UTC+03:00)	Oliynyk (yellow card) 76'; Matyazh 80'; Partsvania (yellow card) 85'	Report	Ferreyra (yellow card) 37'; Ordets 73'	Stadium: Yuvileiny Stadium; Attendance: 9,230; Referee: Yuriy Vaks

23 October 2016 12	Olimpik Donetsk	0–2	Zorya Luhansk	Sumy
17:00 EEST (UTC+03:00)	Baranovskyi (yellow card) 33' (yellow-red card) 64'; Petrov (yellow card) 57'	Report	Rafael Forster 37' (pen.), 64' (pen.)	Stadium: Yuvileiny Stadium; Attendance: 1,720; Referee: Serhiy Berezka

29 October 2016 13	Olimpik Donetsk	2–1	Volyn Lutsk	Sumy
14:00 EEST (UTC+03:00)	Postupalenko 32'; Hryshko 52'; Tanchyk (yellow card) 77'; Partsvania (yellow card) 90+3'	Report	Dudik 27'; Lohinov (yellow card) 58'; Romanyuk (yellow card) 67'; Melinyshyn (yellow card) 90+4'	Stadium: Yuvileiny Stadium; Attendance: 560; Referee: Mykola Balakin

5 November 2016 14	Zirka Kropyvnytskyi	1–2	Olimpik Donetsk	Kropyvnytskyi
14:00 EET (UTC+02:00)	Sitalo (yellow card) 41'; Favorov 45'; Bayenko (yellow card) 52'; Schedryi (yellow card) 60'; Kalinin (yellow card) 63'; Moya (yellow card) 71'; Kovalyov (yellow card) 76'	Report	Doronin (yellow card) 46'; Petrov 77'; Postupalenko (yellow card) 80', (goal) 82'; Fedoriv (yellow card) 90+4'	Stadium: Zirka Stadium; Attendance: 1,669; Referee: Ivan Bondar

19 November 2016 15	Olimpik Donetsk	1–0	Chornomorets Odesa	Sumy
14:00 EET (UTC+02:00)	Matyazh 21', (yellow card) 87'; Petrov (yellow card) 56'	Report	Korkishko (yellow card) 47'; Khocholava (yellow card) 56'; Danchenko (yellow card) 82'	Stadium: Yuvileiny Stadium; Attendance: 720; Referee: Anatoliy Abdula

27 November 2016 16	FC Oleksandriya	1–1	Olimpik Donetsk	Oleksandriya
14:00 EET (UTC+02:00)	Zaporozhan (yellow card) 35'; Zaporozhan (red card) HT'; Ponomar 78'; Leonov (yellow card) 83'	Report	Postupalenko (red card) HT'; Matyazh 50' (pen.)	Stadium: CSC Nika; Attendance: 2,346; Referee: Yuriy Mozharovsky

9 December 2016 18	Dnipro	1–1	Olimpik Donetsk	Dnipro
19:00 EET (UTC+02:00)	Lunyov (yellow card) 11'; Kravchenko (yellow card) 13' (yellow-red card) 67'; Rotan 29'; Vlad (yellow card) 83'; Lunin (yellow card) 90+1'	Report	Bohdanov (yellow card) 12'; Petrov (yellow card) 45'; Tanchyk 85'	Stadium: Dnipro-Arena; Attendance: 1,380; Referee: Yevhen Aranovskyi

25 February 2017 19	Olimpik Donetsk	0–0	Stal Kamianske	Lviv
14:00 EET (UTC+02:00)	Tsymbalyuk (yellow card) 70'	Report	Vasin (yellow card) 63'; Shabanov (yellow card) 81'	Stadium: Arena Lviv; Attendance: 167; Referee: Yaroslav Kozyk

4 March 2017 20	Dynamo Kyiv	1–0	Olimpik Donetsk	Kyiv
17:00 EEST (UTC+03:00)	Harmash (yellow card) 45'; Yarmolenko (yellow card) 68'; Besyedin 90+2'	Report	Tsymbalyuk (yellow card) 71'; Illoy-Ayyet (yellow card) 78'; Fedoriv (yellow card) 84'	Stadium: NSC Olimpiyskiy; Attendance: 10,130; Referee: Yuriy Hryso

11 March 2017 21	Olimpik Donetsk	3–2	Vorskla Poltava	Poltava
14:00 EET (UTC+02:00)	Moha 65'; Hryshko 70'; Matyazh 72', (yellow card) 90'; Bohdanov (yellow card) 79'; Khomutov (yellow card) 86'	Report	Khlyobas 21', (yellow card) 21'; Sharpar (yellow card) 45'; Zahorulko 60'	Stadium: Vorskla Stadium; Attendance: 1,000; Referee: Yuriy Mozharovsky

17 March 2017 22	Shakhtar Donetsk	1–1	Olimpik Donetsk	Kharkiv
19:00 EET (UTC+02:00)	Bernard (yellow card) 36'; Blanco Leschuk 45+2'; Marlos (yellow card) 90+5'	Report	Postupalenko (yellow card) 21', (goal) 24'; Matyazh (yellow card) 62'; Fedoriv (yellow card) 90+5'	Stadium: Metalist OSC; Attendance: 3,800; Referee: Yevhen Aranovskyi

26 March 2017 17	Olimpik Donetsk	0–0	Karpaty Lviv	Cherkasy
14:00 EET (UTC+02:00)	Illoy-Ayyet (yellow card) 63'	Report	Filimonov (yellow card) 24'; Ksyonz (yellow card) 39'; Zubeyko (yellow card) 68'	Stadium: Tsentralnyi Stadion; Attendance: 1,500; Referee: Oleksandr Derdo

1 April 2017 23	Chornomorets Odesa	0–0	Olimpik Donetsk	Odesa
17:00 EEST (UTC+03:00)	Lyulka (yellow card) 19'	Report	Nyemchaninov (yellow card) 68'	Stadium: Chornomorets Stadium; Attendance: 4,152; Referee: Serhiy Berezka

9 April 2017 24	Dynamo Kyiv	4–0	Olimpik Donetsk	Kyiv
19:30 EEST (UTC+03:00)	Besyedin 21'; Yarmolenko 26', 65'; Harmash 51'; Morozyuk (yellow card) 58'	Report	Illoy-Ayyet (yellow card) 60'; Hryshko (yellow card) 90'	Stadium: NSC Olimpiyskiy; Attendance: 8,361; Referee: Anatoliy Abdula

15 April 2017 25	Olimpik Donetsk	0–4	Shakhtar Donetsk	Kyiv
17:00 EEST (UTC+03:00)	Tsymbalyuk (yellow card) 77'	Report	Taison 7'; Bernard 37'; Kovalenko 58'; Ferreyra 61' (pen.)	Stadium: Dynamo Stadium; Attendance: 1,950; Referee: Serhiy Berezka

22 April 2017 26	FC Oleksandriya	1–0	Olimpik Donetsk	Oleksandriya
17:00 EEST (UTC+03:00)	Shendrik (yellow card) 42'; Polyarus 48', (yellow card) 55'; Levanidov (yellow card) 90+2'; Pryyomov (yellow card) 90+4'	Report	Nyemchaninov (yellow card) 90'	Stadium: CSC Nika; Attendance: 2,100; Referee: Yuriy Hryso

30 April 2017 27	Olimpik Donetsk	1–1	Zorya Luhansk	Kyiv
14:00 EEST (UTC+03:00)	Fedoriv (yellow card) 61'; Nyemchaninov 75'; Tsymbalyuk (yellow card) 81'	Report	Paulinho 17'; Hordiyenko (yellow card) 18' (yellow-red card) 90'; Hrechyshkin (yellow card) 49'; Pylyavskyi (yellow card) 80'	Stadium: Dynamo Stadium; Attendance: 1,138; Referee: Yevhen Aranovsky

6 May 2017 28	Olimpik Donetsk	1–0	Chornomorets Odesa	Kyiv
14:00EEST (UTC+03:00)	Illoy-Ayyet (yellow card) 6'; Brikner 16'; Hryn (yellow card) 48'; Bohdanov (yellow card) 55'; Serhiychuk (yellow card) 62'; Khomutov (yellow card) 85'; Oliynyk (yellow card) 90+3'	Report	Khocholava (yellow card) 9' (yellow-red card) 80'; Barilko (yellow card) 20'; Azatskyi (yellow card) 73'	Stadium: Dynamo Stadium; Attendance: 753; Referee: Yaroslav Kozyk

13 May 2017 29	Olimpik Donetsk	2–1	Dynamo Kyiv	Kyiv
17:00 EEST (UTC+03:00)	Serhiychuk 8'; Bohdanov (yellow card) 37'; Postupalenko 63'; Brikner (yellow card) 87'; Tsymbalyuk (yellow card) 90+2'	Report	Kádár (yellow card) 80'; Burda 90+4'	Stadium: Dynamo Stadium; Attendance: 3,531; Referee: Yuriy Mozharovsky

20 May 2017 30	Shakhtar Donetsk	1–1	Olimpik Donetsk	Kyiv
EEST (UTC+03:00)	Butko 50', (yellow card) 80'; Ordets (yellow card) 59'; Kryvtsov (yellow card) 64'; Márcio Azevedo (yellow card) 72'	Report	Serhiychuk 12'; Shestakov (yellow card) 90'	Stadium: Dynamo Stadium; Attendance: 6,631; Referee: Dmytro Kutakov

26 May 2017 31	Olimpik Donetsk	0–0	FC Oleksandriya	Kyiv
19:00 EEST (UTC+03:00)	Postupalenko (yellow card) 14'	Report	Kulish (yellow card) 26'; Tsurikov (yellow card) 51'; Chebotayev (yellow card) 62'	Stadium: Dynamo Stadium; Attendance: 830; Referee: Kostyantyn Trukhanov

31 May 2017 32	Zorya Luhansk	2–0	Olimpik Donetsk	Zaporizhia
19:00 EEST (UTC+03:00)	Sobol 27'; Petryak 80'; Paulinho (yellow card) 83'	[ Report]	Fedoriv (yellow card) 37'	Stadium: Slavutych-Arena; Attendance: 1,600; Referee: Mykola Balakin

=== Ukrainian Cup ===
20 September 2016 Round of 20 (1/16)	Volyn Lutsk	2–1	Olimpik Donetsk	Lutsk
19:00 EEST (UTC+03:00)	Romanyuk (yellow card) 36'; Herasymyuk (yellow card) 38'; Lohinov 65'; Deda 82'; Shabanov (yellow card) 83'; Kychak (yellow card) 90+3'	Report	Partsvania (yellow card) 31'; Fedoriv (yellow card) 54'; Doronin (yellow card) 64'; Hryn 67'	Stadium: Avanhard Stadium; Attendance: 1,280; Referee: Serhiy Skrypak

== Statistics ==
=== Appearances and goals ===
No.	Pos	Nat	Player	Total		Premier League		Cup	
No.	Pos	Nat	Player	Apps	Goals	Apps	Goals	Apps	Goals
Goalkeepers
1	GK	(Ukraine) UKR	Zauri Makharadze	31	0	31	0	0	0
31	GK	(Ukraine) UKR	Yaroslav Kotlyarov	3	0	1+1	0	1	0
Defenders
3	DF	(Ukraine) UKR	Temur Partsvania	14	0	11+2	0	1	0
4	DF	(Ukraine) UKR	Dmytro Hryshko	24	2	23	2	1	0
9	DF	(Ukraine) UKR	Vitaliy Hoshkoderya	28	0	21+6	0	1	0
23	DF	(Ukraine) UKR	Dmytro Nyemchaninov	29	1	26+3	1	0	0
24	DF	(Ukraine) UKR	Vitaliy Fedoriv	18	0	7+10	0	1	0
32	DF	(Ukraine) UKR	Vladis-Emmerson Illoy-Ayyet	22	0	18+3	0	1	0
33	DF	(Ukraine) UKR	Yaroslav Oliynyk	20	0	15+5	0	0	0
44	DF	(Ukraine) UKR	Yevhen Tsymbalyuk	12	0	10+2	0	0	0
Midfielders
8	MF	(Ukraine) UKR	Volodymyr Doronin	16	0	14+1	0	1	0
14	MF	(Ukraine) UKR	Anton Postupalenko	22	7	19+3	7	0	0
15	MF	(Ukraine) UKR	Vitaliy Hemeha	4	0	3+1	0	0	0
17	MF	(Ukraine) UKR	Serhiy Shestakov	29	2	27+1	2	1	0
20	MF	(Ukraine) UKR	Ivan Matyazh	24	5	17+6	5	1	0
25	MF	(Ukraine) UKR	Ihor Zhurakhovskyi	1	0	1	0	0	0
27	MF	(Ukraine) UKR	Ivan Brikner	13	1	6+7	1	0	0
45	MF	(Ukraine) UKR	Vladyslav Khomutov	17	0	3+13	0	1	0
90	MF	(Ukraine) UKR	Andriy Bohdanov	25	4	22+2	4	0+1	0
94	MF	(Ukraine) UKR	Serhiy Hryn	20	3	13+6	2	1	1
Forwards
7	MF	(Ukraine) UKR	Mykhaylo Serhiychuk	9	2	6+3	2	0	0
11	MF	(Morocco) MAR	Moha Rharsalla	13	1	13	1	0	0
22	MF	(Ukraine) UKR	Stanislav Bilenkyi	1	0	0+1	0	0	0
Players transferred out during the season
5	DF	(Ukraine) UKR	Artem Baranovskyi	10	0	9+1	0	0	0
7	MF	(Ukraine) UKR	Maksym Drachenko	6	0	3+3	0	0	0
19	FW	(Ukraine) UKR	Illya Kornyev	5	1	1+4	1	0	0
21	FW	(Ukraine) UKR	Volodymyr Lysenko	12	2	7+4	2	0+1	0
26	MF	(Ukraine) UKR	Kyrylo Petrov	15	2	15	2	0	0
34	MF	(Ukraine) UKR	Volodymyr Tanchyk	15	1	10+4	1	0+1	0

Source: Competitions

Last updated: 31 May 2017

=== Goalscorers ===
Rank	No.	Pos	Nat	Name	Premier League	Cup	Total
1	14	MF	(Ukraine)	Anton Postupalenko	7	0	7
2	20	MF	(Ukraine)	Ivan Matyazh	5	0	5
3	90	MF	(Ukraine)	Andriy Bohdanov	4	0	4
4	94	MF	(Ukraine)	Serhiy Hryn	2	1	3
5	4	DF	(Ukraine)	Dmytro Hryshko	2	0	2
5	7	FW	(Ukraine)	Mykhaylo Serhiychuk	2	0	2
5	17	MF	(Ukraine)	Serhiy Shestakov	2	0	2
5	21	FW	(Ukraine)	Volodymyr Lysenko	2	0	2
5	26	MF	(Ukraine)	Kyrylo Petrov	2	0	2
10	11	FW	(Morocco)	Moha Rharsalla	1	0	1
10	19	FW	(Ukraine)	Illya Kornyev	1	0	1
10	23	DF	(Ukraine)	Dmytro Nyemchaninov	1	0	1
10	27	MF	(Ukraine)	Ivan Brikner	1	0	1
10	34	MF	(Ukraine)	Volodymyr Tanchyk	1	0	1

Last updated: 21 May 2017

=== Clean sheets ===
Rank	No.	Pos	Nat	Name	Premier League	Cup	Total
1	1	GK	(Ukraine)	Zauri Makharadze	7	0	7

Last updated: 26 May 2017

=== Disciplinary record ===
No.	Pos	Nat	Player	Premier League			Cup			Total		
No.	Pos	Nat	Player	Booked	(yellow card) (yellow-red card)	Sent off (straight red)	Booked	(yellow card) (yellow-red card)	Sent off (straight red)	Booked	(yellow card) (yellow-red card)	Sent off (straight red)
1	GK	(Ukraine)	Zauri Makharadze	1	0	0	0	0	0	1	0	0
3	DF	(Ukraine)	Temur Partsvania	3	0	0	1	0	0	4	0	0
4	DF	(Ukraine)	Dmytro Hryshko	1	0	0	0	0	0	1	0	0
5	DF	(Ukraine)	Artem Baranovskyi	2	1	0	0	0	0	2	1	0
7	MF	(Ukraine)	Maksym Drachenko	1	0	0	0	0	0	1	0	0
7	FW	(Ukraine)	Mykhaylo Serhiychuk	1	0	0	0	0	0	1	0	0
8	MF	(Ukraine)	Volodymyr Doronin	2	0	0	2	0	0	4	0	0
9	DF	(Ukraine)	Vitaliy Hoshkoderya	1	0	0	0	0	0	1	0	0
14	MF	(Ukraine)	Anton Postupalenko	5	1	1	0	0	0	5	1	1
17	MF	(Ukraine)	Serhiy Shestakov	3	0	0	0	0	0	3	0	0
20	MF	(Ukraine)	Ivan Matyazh	3	0	0	0	0	0	3	0	0
21	FW	(Ukraine)	Volodymyr Lysenko	2	0	0	0	0	0	2	0	0
23	DF	(Ukraine)	Dmytro Nyemchaninov	3	0	0	0	0	0	3	0	0
24	DF	(Ukraine)	Vitaliy Fedoriv	6	0	0	1	0	0	7	0	0
26	MF	(Ukraine)	Kyrylo Petrov	6	0	0	0	0	0	6	0	0
27	MF	(Ukraine)	Ivan Brikner	1	0	0	0	0	0	1	0	0
32	DF	(Ukraine)	Vladis-Emmerson Illoy-Ayyet	4	0	0	0	0	0	4	0	0
33	DF	(Ukraine)	Yaroslav Oliynyk	3	0	0	0	0	0	3	0	0
34	MF	(Ukraine)	Volodymyr Tanchyk	3	0	0	0	0	0	3	0	0
44	DF	(Ukraine)	Yevhen Tsymbalyuk	5	0	0	0	0	0	5	0	0
45	MF	(Ukraine)	Vladyslav Khomutov	4	0	0	0	0	0	4	0	0
90	MF	(Ukraine)	Andriy Bohdanov	5	0	0	0	0	0	5	0	0
94	MF	(Ukraine)	Serhiy Hryn	1	0	0	0	0	0	1	0	0

Last updated: 31 May 2017
