= 2017–18 FC Olimpik Donetsk season =

Olimpik Donetsk
2017–18 season
- President: Vladyslav Helzin
- Manager: Roman Sanzhar
- Stadium: Dynamo Stadium, Kyiv
- Ukrainian Premier League: 9th
- Ukrainian Cup: Round of 16 (1/8)
- UEFA Europa League: 3Q
- Top goalscorer: League: Stanislav Bilenkyi (6); All: Stanislav Bilenkyi (7)
Home colours	Away colours

The 2017–18 season was fourth consecutive season in the top Ukrainian football league for Olimpik Donetsk. Olimpik competed in Premier League, Ukrainian Cup. For the time in history of Olimpik it took part in European club tournament, representing Ukraine in UEFA Europa League during this season.

== Players ==
=== Squad information ===
As of 31 May 2018

Squad no.	Name	Nationality	Position	Date of birth (age)
Goalkeepers
1	Zauri Makharadze (Captain)	(Georgia (country)) (Ukraine)	GK	24 March 1993 (aged 25)
13	Artem Kychak	(Ukraine)	GK	16 May 1989 (aged 29)
77	Bohdan Bezkrovnyi ^{List B}	(Ukraine)	GK	21 November 1998 (aged 19)
Defenders
5	Andriy Mischenko	(Ukraine)	DF	7 April 1991 (aged 27)
18	Zurab Ochigava (on loan from Dynamo Kyiv)	(Ukraine)	DF	18 May 1995 (aged 23)
21	Nazar Yedynak ^{List B}	(Ukraine)	DF	3 April 1998 (aged 20)
23	Dmytro Nyemchaninov (on loan from Krylia Sovetov Samara)	(Ukraine)	DF	27 January 1990 (aged 28)
24	Vadym Schastlyvtsev	(Ukraine)	DF	18 April 1998 (aged 20)
32	Vladis-Emmerson Illoy-Ayyet	(Republic of the Congo) (Ukraine)	DF	7 October 1995 (aged 22)
44	Yevhen Tsymbalyuk	(Ukraine)	DF	19 June 1996 (aged 21)
74	Ihor Snurnitsyn ^{List B}	(Ukraine)	DF	7 March 2000 (aged 18)
79	Serhiy Vakulenko (on loan from Shakhtar Donetsk)	(Ukraine)	DF	7 September 1993 (aged 24)
88	Luka Nadiradze ^{List B}	(Georgia (country))	DF	24 October 1996 (aged 21)
89	Artem Kozlov ^{List B}	(Ukraine)	DF	10 February 1997 (aged 21)
95	Serhiy Kulynych	(Ukraine)	DF	9 January 1995 (aged 23)
Midfielders
7	Ivan Sondey	(Ukraine)	MF	15 January 1994 (aged 24)
8	Volodymyr Doronin	(Ukraine)	MF	15 January 1993 (aged 25)
9	Ruslan Kisil	(Ukraine)	MF	23 October 1991 (aged 26)
11	Artem Schedryi	(Ukraine)	MF	9 November 1992 (aged 25)
17	Vitaliy Balashov	(Ukraine)	MF	15 January 1991 (aged 27)
20	Leônidas	(Brazil)	MF	17 October 1995 (aged 22)
27	Ivan Brikner	(Ukraine)	MF	30 June 1993 (aged 24)
41	Hennadiy Pasich	(Ukraine)	MF	13 July 1993 (aged 24)
42	Yevhen Pasich	(Ukraine)	MF	13 July 1993 (aged 24)
45	Vladyslav Khomutov ^{List B}	(Ukraine)	MF	4 June 1998 (aged 19)
70	Artem Tyshchenko ^{List B}	(Ukraine)	MF	16 March 2000 (aged 18)
92	Josip Vuković	(Croatia)	MF	2 May 1992 (aged 26)
98	Vladyslav Apostoliuk ^{List B}	(Ukraine)	MF	13 March 1998 (aged 20)
Forwards
10	Vladyslav Helzin	(Ukraine)	FW	27 August 1973 (aged 44)
22	Stanislav Bilenkyi ^{List B}	(Ukraine)	FW	22 August 1998 (aged 19)
99	Yuriy Zakharkiv	(Ukraine)	FW	21 March 1996 (aged 22)

== Transfers ==
=== In ===
Date	Pos.	Player	Age	Moving from	Type	Fee	Source
Summer
13 July 2017	DF	(Ukraine) Anton Kravchenko	26	(Ukraine) Stal Kamianske	Transfer	Free	
13 July 2017	DF	(Ukraine) Artem Shabanov	25	(Ukraine) Stal Kamianske	Transfer	Free	
13 July 2017	DF	(Ukraine) Vyacheslav Lukhtanov	22	(Ukraine) Veres Rivne	Transfer	Free	
14 July 2017	MF	(Ukraine) Ivan Sondey	23	(Ukraine) Naftovyk-Ukrnafta	Transfer	Free	
14 July 2017	MF	(Brazil) Guttiner	22	(Brazil) Acadêmica Vitória	Transfer	Undisclosed	
21 July 2017	GK	(Ukraine) Artem Kychak	28	(Ukraine) Volyn Lutsk	Transfer	Free	
21 July 2017	FW	(Ukraine) Ilya Mikhalyov	26	(Russia) Luch-Energiya Vladivostok	Transfer	Free	
13 October 2017	MF	(Ukraine) Volodymyr Pryyomov	31	(Ukraine) FC Oleksandriya	Transfer	Free	
12 July 2017	DF	(Ukraine) Pavlo Lukyanchuk	21	(Ukraine) Dynamo Kyiv	Loan		
21 July 2017	MF	(Ukraine) Oleksandr Mihunov	23	(Ukraine) Shakhtar Donetsk	Loan		
1 September 2017	DF	(Ukraine) Zurab Ochigava	22	(Ukraine) Dynamo Kyiv	Loan		
Winter
11 January 2018	MF	(Ukraine) Ruslan Kisil	26	(Ukraine) FC Mariupol	Transfer	Undisclosed	
1 February 2018	DF	(Ukraine) Serhiy Kulynych	23	(Belarus) FC Minsk	Transfer	Free	
1 February 2018	MF	(Ukraine) Hennadiy Pasich	24	(Ukraine) Veres Rivne	Transfer	Free	
1 February 2018	MF	(Ukraine) Yevhen Pasich	24	(Ukraine) Veres Rivne	Transfer	Free	
2 February 2018	DF	(Ukraine) Temur Partsvania	26	(Ukraine) Desna Chernihiv	Transfer	Free	
14 February 2018	MF	(Ukraine) Artem Schedryi	25	(Ukraine) FC Oleksandriya	Transfer	Free	
16 February 2018	MF	(Brazil) Leônidas	22	(Ukraine) Zorya Luhansk	Transfer	Undisclosed	
24 February 2018	DF	(Ukraine) Andriy Mischenko	26	Unattached	Transfer	Free	
1 March 2018	FW	(Ukraine) Yuriy Zakharkiv	21	(Ukraine) SC Dnipro-1	Transfer	Free	
2 March 2018	MF	(Croatia) Josip Vuković	25	(Bosnia and Herzegovina) Vitez	Transfer	Free	
2 March 2018	MF	(Ukraine) Vladyslav Apostoliuk	19	(Slovakia) Poprad	Transfer	Free	
30 March 2018	MF	(Ukraine) Vitaliy Balashov	27	(Belarus) Isloch Minsk Raion	Transfer	Free	
11 May 2018	FW	(Ukraine) Vladyslav Helzin	44	Unattached	Transfer	Free	
1 January 2018	GK	(Ukraine) Yaroslav Kotlyarov	20	(Ukraine) Helios Kharkiv	Loan return		
1 January 2018	DF	(Ukraine) Vadym Schastlyvtsev	19	(Ukraine) Helios Kharkiv	Loan return		
1 January 2018	DF	(Ukraine) Artem Kozlov	20	(Ukraine) Helios Kharkiv	Loan return		
25 January 2018	MF	(Ukraine) Serhiy Vakulenko	24	(Ukraine) Shakhtar Donetsk	Loan		
13 February 2018	DF	(Ukraine) Dmytro Nyemchaninov	28	(Russia) Krylia Sovetov Samara	Loan		

=== Out ===
Date	Pos.	Player	Age	Moving to	Type	Fee	Source
Summer
2 July 2017	MF	(Ukraine) Ivan Matyazh	29	(Croatia) Istra 1961	Transfer	Free	
5 July 2017	GK	(Ukraine) Bohdan Stepanenko	21	(Ukraine) Nyva Ternopil	Transfer	Undisclosed	
9 July 2017	DF	(Ukraine) Dmytro Hryshko	31	(Russia) SKA-Khabarovsk	Transfer	Free	
11 July 2017	MF	(Ukraine) Vitaliy Hoshkoderya	29	(Kazakhstan) Okzhetpes	Transfer	Free	
11 July 2017	FW	(Ukraine) Mykhaylo Serhiychuk	25	(Ukraine) Veres Rivne	Transfer	Free	
21 July 2017	DF	(Ukraine) Yaroslav Oliynyk	26	(Russia) Tom Tomsk	Transfer	Free	
3 August 2017	MF	(Ukraine) Ihor Zhurakhovskyi	22	(Sweden) Gefle	Transfer	Free	
17 August 2017	MF	(Ukraine) Vitaliy Hemeha	23	(Ukraine) Rukh Vynnyky	Transfer	Free	
17 August 2017	DF	(Ukraine) Dmytro Nyemchaninov	27	(Russia) Krylia Sovetov Samara	Transfer	$0.055M	
2 September 2017	DF	(Ukraine) Temur Partsvania	26	(Ukraine) Desna Chernihiv	Transfer	Free	
1 July 2017	MF	(Ukraine) Serhiy Hryn	23	(Ukraine) Shakhtar Donetsk	Loan return		
8 July 2017	MF	(Ukraine) Vladyslav Sharay	20	(Ukraine) Avanhard Kramatorsk	Loan		
13 July 2017	DF	(Ukraine) Vadym Schastlyvtsev	19	(Ukraine) Helios Kharkiv	Loan		
13 July 2017	DF	(Ukraine) Artem Kozlov	20	(Ukraine) Helios Kharkiv	Loan		
23 July 2017	GK	(Ukraine) Yaroslav Kotlyarov	19	(Ukraine) Helios Kharkiv	Loan		
Winter
Winter 2018	FW	(Ukraine) Ilya Mikhalyov	27	(Georgia (country)) Kolkheti Poti	Transfer	Free	
15 January 2018	MF	(Ukraine) Serhiy Shestakov	27	(Hungary) Diósgyőri VTK	Transfer	Undisclosed	
5 January 2018	MF	(Ukraine) Andriy Bohdanov	27	(Poland) Arka Gdynia	Transfer	Free	
6 January 2018	DF	(Ukraine) Artem Shabanov	25	(Ukraine) Dynamo Kyiv	Transfer	Undisclosed	
12 January 2018	MF	(Ukraine) Serhiy Rusyan	18	(Ukraine) FC Oleksandriya	Transfer	Undisclosed	
25 January 2018	FW	(Morocco) Moha Rharsalla	24	(Slovakia) Slovan Bratislava	Transfer	€0.25M	
26 January 2018	DF	(Ukraine) Anton Kravchenko	26	(Turkey) Karabükspor	Transfer	Undisclosed	
6 February 2018	MF	(Brazil) Guttiner Tenorio	23	(Ukraine) Chornomorets Odesa	Transfer	Free	
22 February 2018	DF	(Ukraine) Vitaliy Fedoriv	30	(Russia) Olimpiyets Nizhny Novgorod	Transfer	Free	
23 February 2018	MF	(Ukraine) Volodymyr Pryyomov	31	(Brunei) DPMM	Transfer	Free	
24 February 2018	DF	(Ukraine) Dmytro Petryk	19	(Czech Republic) Dukla Prague	Transfer	Undisclosed	
24 February 2018	MF	(Ukraine) Volodymyr Zubashevskyi	18	(Czech Republic) Dukla Prague	Transfer	Undisclosed	
24 February 2018	АЦ	(Ukraine) Oleksandr Voytiuk	19	(Slovakia) Trenčín	Transfer	Undisclosed	
2 March 2018	DF	(Ukraine) Vyacheslav Lukhtanov	23	(Belarus) FC Smolevichi	Transfer	Free	
22 March 2018	MF	(Ukraine) Anton Postupalenko	29	(Belarus) Torpedo-BelAZ Zhodino	Transfer	Free	
23 April 2018	DF	(Ukraine) Temur Partsvania	26	Unattached	Transfer	Free	
1 January 2018	DF	(Ukraine) Pavlo Lukyanchuk	21	(Ukraine) Dynamo Kyiv	Loan return		
1 January 2018	MF	(Ukraine) Oleksandr Mihunov	23	(Ukraine) Shakhtar Donetsk	Loan return		
3 March 2018	GK	(Ukraine) Yaroslav Kotlyarov	20	(Ukraine) Sudnobudivnyk Mykolaiv	Loan		

== Pre-season and friendlies ==
24 June 2017 Friendly	Kolos Kovalivka (Ukraine)	1–0	(Ukraine) Olimpik Donetsk	Kovalivka
17:30 EEST (UTC+03:00)	Nekhtiy 38'	Report		Stadium: Kolos Stadium; Attendance: 750

28 June 2017 Friendly	Olimpik Donetsk (Ukraine)	0–0	(Ukraine) Helios Kharkiv	Vysokyi
17:00 EEST (UTC+03:00)		Report		Stadium: Metalist training base Attendance: 70; Referee: Kostyantyn Truhanov

2 July 2017 Friendly	Olimpik Donetsk (Ukraine)	1–3	(Ukraine) FC Mariupol	Poltava
17:00 EEST (UTC+03:00)	Bilenkyi 37' (pen.)	Report	Fomin 13' (pen.); Illoy-Ayyet 54' (o.g.); Yavorskyi 68'	Stadium: Ltava Stadium; Attendance: 20; Referee: Andriy Kovalenko

5 July 2017 Friendly	Naftovyk-Ukrnafta Okhtyrka (Ukraine)	2–1	(Ukraine) Olimpik Donetsk	Vysokyi
18:00 EEST (UTC+03:00)	Antyukh 17'; Vlasyuk 39'	Report	Brikner 17'	Stadium: Metalist training base Attendance: 70; Referee: Anatoliy Abdula

8 July 2017 Friendly	Olimpik Donetsk (Ukraine)	1–2	(Ukraine) Helios Kharkiv	Vysokyi
11:00 EEST (UTC+03:00)	Moha 30'	Report	Kravchenko 25'; Kozlov 29'	Stadium: Metalist training base Referee: Oleksandr Afanasyev

8 October 2017 Friendly	Dynamo Kyiv (Ukraine)	1–2	(Ukraine) Olimpik Donetsk	Kyiv
13:00 EEST (UTC+03:00)	Rusyn 4'	Report	Moha 25' (pen.), 86'	Stadium: Dynamo Stadium; Referee: Volodymyr Novokhatniyi

18 January 2018 Friendly	Steaua București (Romania)	1–2	(Ukraine) Olimpik Donetsk	Belek, Turkey
14:00 EET (UTC+2)	Man 36'	Report	Bilenkyi 53', 69'	Stadium: Gloria Sports Arena; Attendance: 100

21 January 2018 Friendly	Olimpik Donetsk (Ukraine)	0–0	(Poland) Korona Kielce	Antalya, Turkey
16:30 EET (UTC+02:00)		Report		Stadium: Titanic sport complex Attendance: 50

24 January 2018 Friendly	Olimpik Donetsk (Ukraine)	0–1	(Slovakia) Slovan Bratislava	Antalya, Turkey
14:30 EET (UTC+02:00)		Report	Bozhikov 45'	Stadium: Titanic sport complex Attendance: 50

26 January 2018 Friendly	Shkëndija (North Macedonia)	4–1	(Ukraine) Olimpik Donetsk	Belek, Turkey
14:00 EET (UTC+02:00)	Stênio Júnior 11'; Radeski 56'; Ibraimi 73'; Todorovski 83'	Report	Schastlyvtsev 53'	Stadium: Susesi sports center Attendance: 100

3 February 2018 Friendly	Cracovia (Poland)	Cancelled	(Ukraine) Olimpik Donetsk	Turkey
EET (UTC+02:00)		[ Report]

3 February 2018 Friendly	Trepça Mitrovicë (Kosovo)	0–3	(Ukraine) Olimpik Donetsk	Antalya, Turkey
16:00 EET (UTC+02:00)		Report	Bilenkyi 8', 11' (pen.); Sondey 75'	Stadium: Miracle; Attendance: 50

6 February 2018 Friendly	Baník Ostrava (Czech Republic)	0–3	(Ukraine) Olimpik Donetsk	Belek, Turkey
14:30 EET (UTC+02:00)		Report	Bilenkyi 9', 53', 68'	Stadium: Belconti sport complex Attendance: 50

9 February 2018 Friendly	Kaisar Kyzylorda (Kazakhstan)	0–2	(Ukraine) Olimpik Donetsk	Antalya, Turkey
16:00 EET (UTC+02:00)		Report	Hennadiy Pasich 7'; Bilenkyi 13'	Stadium: Miracle; Attendance: 50

13 February 2018 Friendly	Olimpik Donetsk (Ukraine)	1–0	(Hungary) Paks	Antalya, Turkey
16:30 EET (UTC+02:00)	Vakulenko 64'	Report		Stadium: Titanic sports complex Attendance: 50

8 March 2018 Friendly	PFC Sumy (Ukraine)	2–0	(Ukraine) Olimpik Donetsk	Shchaslyve
16:30 EET (UTC+02:00)	Halenkov; Halenko	Report

== Competitions ==
=== Overall ===
Competition	First match	Last match	Starting round	Final position	Record							
Competition	First match	Last match	Starting round	Final position	Pld	W	D	L	GF	GA	GD	Win %
Premier League	19 July 2017	19 May 2018	Matchday 1	9th	32	9	9	14	29	38	−9	28.13
Cup	25 October 2017	25 October 2017	Round of 16 (1/8)	Round of 16 (1/8)	1	0	0	1	0	2	−2	0.00
Europa League	27 July 2017	3 August 2017	3Q	3Q	2	0	1	1	1	3	−2	0.00
Total					35	9	10	16	30	43	−13	25.71

Last updated: 19 May 2018
Source: Competitions

=== Premier League ===
==== League table ====
Pos	Team	Pld	W	D	L	GF	GA	GD	Pts	Qualification or relegation
7	FC Oleksandriya	32	10	15	7	32	27	+5	45	
8	Karpaty Lviv	32	8	13	11	28	45	−17	37	
9	Olimpik Donetsk	32	9	9	14	29	38	−9	36	
10	Zirka Kropyvnytskyi (R)	32	7	10	15	22	40	−18	31	Qualification for the Relegation play-offs
11	Chornomorets Odesa (Z)	32	6	11	15	26	49	−23	29	Qualification for the Relegation play-offs

Source: Ukrainian Premier League (in Ukrainian), UEFA, Soccerway
Rules for classification: 1) Points; 2) Goal difference; 3) Goals scored; 4) Head-to-head points; 5) Head-to-head goal difference; 6) Head-to-head goals scored; 7) Draw.
(R) Relegated; (Z) Readmitted in after withdrawal of FC Poltava. see 2017–18 Ukrainian Premier League #Relegation play-offs for more information.

Team 1	Agg.	Team 2	1st leg	2nd leg
Zirka Kropyvnytskyi	1–5	Desna Chernihiv	1–1	0–4
Chornomorets Odesa	1–3	FC Poltava	1–0	0–3 (a.e.t.)

==== Results summary ====
Overall								Home						Away					
Pld	W	D	L	GF	GA	GD	Pts	W	D	L	GF	GA	GD	W	D	L	GF	GA	GD
32	9	9	14	29	38	−9	36	6	4	6	16	20	−4	3	5	8	13	18	−5

Last updated: 19 May 2018.
Source: Competitive matches

==== Results by round ====
Round	1	2	3	4	5	6	7	8	9	10	11	12	13	14	15	16	17	18	19	20	21	22	23	24	25	26	27	28	29	30	31	32
Ground	A	A	H	A	H	A	H	A	H	A	H	H	H	A	H	A	H	A	H	A	H	A	A	H	A	A	H	H	A	H	H	A
Result	W	D	D	W	W	L	D	D	L	D	W	W	W	D	D	L	L	L	L	L	W	L	W	L	D	L	D	L	L	L	W	L
Position	2	3	6	3	3	4	5	4	6	6	6	4	3	3	3	3	4	5	7	7	7	7	7	7	7	7	7	8	8	8	8	9

Updated to match(es) played on 19 May 2018. Source: Competitive matches
A = Away; H = Home; W = Win; D = Draw; L = Loss

==== Matches ====
16 July 2017 1	FC Oleksandriya	0–2	Olimpik Donetsk	Oleksandriya
19:30 EEST (UTC+03:00)	Hitchenko (yellow card) 43'; Kalenchuk (yellow card) 49'; Sitalo (yellow card) 56'; Tsurikov (yellow card) 71'; Chebotayev (yellow card) 76'; Batsula (yellow card) 85'	Report	Khomutov 16'; Nyemchaninov 36', (yellow card) 75'; Bilenkyi (yellow card) 49'; Moha (yellow card) 90+3'	Stadium: CSC Nika Stadium; Attendance: 2,400; Referee: Yevhen Aranovsky

22 July 2017 2	Zirka Kropyvnytskyi	0–0	Olimpik Donetsk	Kropyvnytskyi
19:30 EEST (UTC+03:00)	Hovhannisyan (yellow card) 53'; Zahalskyi (yellow card) 87'; Eseola (yellow card) 90+2'	Report	Shabanov (yellow card) 45+1'; Lukyanchuk (yellow card) 73'; Moha (yellow card) 87'; Kravchenko (yellow card) 90+2'	Stadium: Zirka Stadium; Attendance: 2,542; Referee: Anatoliy Abdula

30 July 2017 3	Olimpik Donetsk	0–0	Veres Rivne	Kyiv
19:30 EEST (UTC+03:00)	Brikner (yellow card) 16'; Fedoriv (yellow card) 34'; Illoy-Ayyet (yellow card) 45+2'; Bohdanov (yellow card) 83'	Report	Siminin (yellow card) 20'	Stadium: Dynamo Stadium; Attendance: 753; Referee: Denys Shurman

6 August 2017 4	Zorya Luhansk	0–2	Olimpik Donetsk	Zaporizhia
19:30 EEST (UTC+03:00)	Hrechyshkin (yellow card) 25'	Report	Illoy-Ayyet (yellow card) 22'; Kravchenko (yellow card) 40'; Guttiner (yellow card) 41'; Bilenkyi 69'; Moha 86'; Lukhtanov (yellow card) 90+2'	Stadium: Slavutych-Arena; Attendance: 2,863; Referee: Yevhen Aranovsky

13 August 2017 5	Olimpik Donetsk	1–0	Chornomorets Odesa	Kyiv
19:30 EEST (UTC+03:00)	Moha 47'; Shestakov (yellow card) 47'; Tsymbalyuk (yellow card) 90+1'	Report	Vasin (yellow card) 17'; Balan (yellow card) 30'; Rakhmanaw (yellow card) 45+1'; Novotryasov (yellow card) 72'	Stadium: Dynamo Stadium; Attendance: 800; Referee: Yuriy Mozharovsky

19 August 2017 6	Shakhtar Donetsk	2–0	Olimpik Donetsk	Kharkiv
19:30 EEST (UTC+03:00)	Ferreyra 20'; Marlos 57' (pen.); Rakitskiy (yellow card) 89'	Report	Shabanov (yellow card) 48'; Postupalenko (yellow card) 55'; Lukhtanov (yellow card) 76'	Stadium: Metalist OSC; Attendance: 11,254; Referee: Kostyantyn Trukhanov

26 August 2017 7	Olimpik Donetsk	0–0	Karpaty Lviv	Kyiv
19:30 EEST (UTC+03:00)	Kravchenko (yellow card) 64'	Report	Lebedenko (yellow card) 70'	Stadium: Dynamo Stadium; Attendance: 800; Referee: Dmytro Bondarenko

9 September 2017 8	Vorskla Poltava	1–1	Olimpik Donetsk	Poltava
19:30 EEST (UTC+03:00)	Kravchenko 1'; Sklyar (yellow card) 26'; Kolomoyets (yellow card) 74'; Chesnakov (yellow card) 90+1'	Report	Moha 26' (pen.); Postupalenko (yellow card) 29'; Makharadze (yellow card) 29'; Ochigava (yellow card) 35'; Shabanov (yellow card) 75'; Brikner (yellow card) 90+3'	Stadium: Vorskla Stadium; Attendance: 4,000; Referee: Ihor Paskhal

17 September 2017 9	Olimpik Donetsk	1–2	Dynamo Kyiv	Kyiv
19:30 EEST (UTC+03:00)	Kravchenko (yellow card) 28'; Fedoriv (yellow card) 37'; Moha (yellow card) 38', (goal) 42'; Bohdanov (yellow card) 40'; Postupalenko (yellow card) 62'; Mikhalyov (yellow card) 78'	Report	Tsyhankov 20'; Vida (yellow card) 37'; Buyalskyi 45+1', (yellow card) 90+3'; González (yellow card) 59'; Kádár (yellow card) 78'	Stadium: Dynamo Stadium; Attendance: 7,000; Referee: Viktor Kopiyevskyi

24 September 2017 10	Stal Kamianske	1–1	Olimpik Donetsk	Kyiv
14:00 EEST (UTC+03:00)	Meskhi 24', (yellow card) 79'; Yakymiv (yellow card) 45'; Khotsyanovskyi (yellow card) 86'; Tymchyk (yellow card) 90+1'	Report	Brikner (yellow card) 40'; Bilenkyi 60'; Ochigava (yellow card) 63'	Stadium: Obolon Arena; Attendance: 346; Referee: Serhiy Boyko

30 September 2017 11	Olimpik Donetsk	3–2	FC Mariupol	Kyiv
14:00 EEST (UTC+03:00)	Kravchenko (yellow card) 45', (goal) 57'; Fedoriv (yellow card) 45+2'; Ochigava (yellow card) 53' (yellow-red card) 68'; Bilenkyi 78'; Bohdanov 84' (pen.)	Report	Vakulenko (yellow card) 19' (yellow-red card) 49'; Yavorskyi (yellow card) 33'; Boryachuk 73'; Koltsov 75' (pen.), (yellow card) 90+2'; Fomin (yellow card) 90'	Stadium: Dynamo Stadium; Attendance: 350; Referee: Anatoliy Abdula

14 October 2017 12	Olimpik Donetsk	1–0	FC Oleksandriya	Kyiv
17:00 EEST (UTC+03:00)	Shestakov (yellow card) 73'; Brikner 88'	Report	Sitalo (yellow card) 7'; Pashayev (yellow card) 83'	Stadium: Dynamo Stadium; Attendance: 325; Referee: Serhiy Berezka

21 October 2017 13	Olimpik Donetsk	1–0	Zirka Kropyvnytskyi	Kyiv
14:00 EEST (UTC+03:00)	Shabanov (yellow card) 61'; Kravchenko (yellow card) 65'; Polehenko 90' (o.g.)	Report	Drachenko (yellow card) 18'; Kacharaba (yellow card) 29'; Favorov (yellow card) 37' (yellow-red card) 59'; Kovalyov (red card) 38'	Stadium: Dynamo Stadium; Attendance: 200; Referee: Yevhen Aranovsky

29 October 2017 14	Veres Rivne	1–1	Olimpik Donetsk	Lviv
17:00 EET (UTC+02:00)	Serhiychuk 10' (pen.); Morozenko (yellow card) 28'; Siminin (yellow card) 51'; Adamyuk (yellow card) 65'; Borzenko (yellow card) 80'; Zapadnya (yellow card) 83'	Report	Bohdanov (yellow card) 16'; Moha 51'; Fedoriv (yellow card) 90+2'	Stadium: Arena Lviv; Attendance: 738; Referee: Vitaliy Romanov

5 November 2017 15	Olimpik Donetsk	3–3	Zorya Luhansk	Kyiv
19:30 EET (UTC+02:00)	Kravchenko 11'; Moha (yellow card) 35'; Bilenkyi 48'; Shabanov (yellow card) 49'; Lukyanchuk (yellow card) 59'; Bohdanov 67'; Makharadze (yellow card) 90+2'	Report	Lunyov (yellow card) 57', (goal) 62'; Andriyevskyi (red card) 70'; Opanasenko 83'; Kharatin 90+4'	Stadium: Dynamo Stadium; Attendance: 1,000; Referee: Yuriy Mozharovskyi

19 November 2017 16	Chornomorets Odesa	2–1	Olimpik Donetsk	Odesa
19:30 EET (UTC+02:00)	N'Diaye (yellow card) 13'; Vasin (yellow card) 39'; Wagué (yellow card) 43', (goal) 81'; Kovalets (yellow card) 54', (goal) 58'; Orikhovskyi (yellow card) 75'; Politylo (yellow card) 85'	Report	Bohdanov (yellow card) 56'; Kravchenko (yellow card) 80'; Ochigava (yellow card) 85', (goal) 90+3'	Stadium: Chornomorets Stadium; Attendance: 3,642; Referee: Denys Shurman

25 November 2017 17	Olimpik Donetsk	2–4	Shakhtar Donetsk	Kyiv
17:00 EET (UTC+02:00)	Pryyomov 7', 86'; Shabanov (yellow card) 89'	Report	Ferreyra 6', 39' (pen.); Stepanenko (yellow card) 34'; Bernard 57'; Fred 74', (yellow card) 76'; Petryak (yellow card) 90+1'	Stadium: Dynamo Stadium; Attendance: 1,000; Referee: Yevhen Aranovsky

3 December 2017; 21 February 2018^{[a]} 18	Karpaty Lviv	2–1	Olimpik Donetsk	Lviv
14:00 EET (UTC+02:00)	Tissone (yellow card) 7'; Myakushko 43'; Carrascal 56'	Report	Kravchenko 45+3'; Tsymbalyuk (yellow card) 63'; Kisil (yellow card) 69'; Ochigava (yellow card) 76' (yellow-red card) 80'; Bilenkyi (yellow card) 83'	Stadium: Ukraina Stadium; Attendance: 1,935; Referee: Kateryna Monzul

9 December 2017 19	Olimpik Donetsk	1–4	Vorskla Poltava	Kyiv
17:00 EET (UTC+02:00)	Fedoriv (yellow card) 14'; Pryyomov 20', (yellow card) 33'	Report	Kobakhidze 10'; Chyzhov 22', (yellow card) 26'; Kulach 27' (pen.); Perduta (yellow card) 48'; Sharpar 88'	Stadium: Dynamo Stadium; Attendance: 553; Referee: Mykola Balakin

18 February 2018 20	Dynamo Kyiv	1–0	Olimpik Donetsk	Kyiv
17:00 EET (UTC+02:00)	Tsyhankov 24'; Kádár (yellow card) 26'; Burda (yellow card) 30'; Shepelyev (yellow card) 70'; Kędziora (yellow card) 75'; Rotan (yellow card) 82'	Report	Partsvania (yellow card) 56'	Stadium: NSC Olimpiyskiy; Attendance: 5,069; Referee: Viktor Kopiyevskyi

25 February 2018 21	Olimpik Donetsk	2–0	Stal Kamianske	Kyiv
14:00 EET (UTC+02:00)	Illoy-Ayyet (yellow card) 12'; Tsymbalyuk (yellow card) 53'; Hennadiy Pasich (yellow card) 56'; Kisil 67', (yellow card) 77'; Bilenkyi 75' (pen.)	Report	Johnathan (yellow card) 58'; Yakymiv (yellow card) 80'; Oshchypko (yellow card) 88'	Stadium: Dynamo Stadium; Attendance: 84; Referee: Dmytro Bondarenko

4 March 2018 22	FC Mariupol	1–0	Olimpik Donetsk	Mariupol
14:00 EET (UTC+02:00)	Bolbat 29'; Dawa (yellow card) 40'; Demiri (yellow card) 65'	Report	Vakulenko (yellow card) 15'; Doronin (yellow card) 45+1'; Hennadiy Pasich (yellow card) 57'; Ochigava (yellow card) 76'	Stadium: Volodymyr Boiko Stadium; Attendance: 2,250; Referee: Vitaliy Romanov

11 March 2018 23	Karpaty Lviv	0–3	Olimpik Donetsk	Lviv
14:00 EET (UTC+02:00)	Akulinin (yellow card) 45+1' (yellow-red card) 64'; Klyots (yellow card) 51'; Verbnyi (yellow card) 55'; Fedetskyi (yellow card) 64'; Hutsulyak (yellow card) 77'	Report	Bilenkyi 45' (pen.); Tsymbalyuk (yellow card) 66'; Illoy-Ayyet (yellow card) 77'; Hennadiy Pasich 84'; Schedryi 90+2'	Stadium: Ukraina Stadium; Attendance: 3,423; Referee: Mykola Balakin

17 March 2018 24	Olimpik Donetsk	0–1	Zirka Kropyvnytskyi	Kyiv
17:00 EET (UTC+03:00)	Zakharkiv (yellow card) 69'; Makharadze (yellow card) 90'	Report	Fatyeyev (yellow card) 56'; Ochigava 60' (o.g.); Rullier (yellow card) 64'; Zahalskyi (yellow card) 89'; Guedj (yellow card) 90'	Stadium: Dynamo Stadium; Attendance: 150; Referee: Volodymyr Milanych

1 April 2018 25	Stal Kamianske	0–0	Olimpik Donetsk	Kyiv
19:30 EEST (UTC+03:00)	Hrachov (yellow card) 9'; Meskhi (yellow card) 17'; Mysyk (yellow card) 90+2'	Report	Vakulenko (yellow card) 19'; Vuković (yellow card) 28'; Yevhen Pasich (yellow card) 45+1'; Hennadiy Pasich (yellow card) 66'	Stadium: Obolon Arena; Attendance: 280; Referee: Yevhen Aranovskyi

7 April 2018 26	Chornomorets Odesa	3–1	Olimpik Donetsk	Odesa
17:00 EEST (UTC+03:00)	Hladkyy (yellow card) 24', (goal) 33', 43'; Matyazh 82'; Bobko (yellow card) 84'	Report	Sondey 42'; Doronin (yellow card) 53'	Stadium: Chornomorets Stadium; Attendance: 3,532; Referee: Serhiy Boyko

15 April 2018 27	Olimpik Donetsk	0–0	FC Oleksandriya	Kyiv
14:00 EEST (UTC+03:00)	Kulynych (yellow card) 84'	Report	Stetskov (yellow card) 77'	Stadium: Dynamo Stadium; Attendance: 575; Referee: Volodymyr Novokhatniy

22 April 2018 28	Olimpik Donetsk	0–2	Karpaty Lviv	Kyiv
14:00 EEST (UTC+03:00)	Yevhen Pasich (yellow card) 27'; Vakulenko (yellow card) 80'; Tsymbalyuk (yellow card) 90+3'	Report	Carrascal (yellow card) 21', (goal) 58'; Shved 22'; Fedetskyi (yellow card) 28'; Nesterov (yellow card) 56'	Stadium: Dynamo Stadium; Attendance: 700; Referee: Denys Shurman

28 April 2018 29	Zirka Kropyvnytskyi	2–0	Olimpik Donetsk	Kropyvnytskyi
14:00 EEST (UTC+03:00)	Hovhannisyan (yellow card) 14'; Drachenko (yellow card) 60'; Petrov 64'; Chychykov 75'	Report	Doronin (yellow card) 10'; Hennadiy Pasich (yellow card) 23'; Mishchenko (yellow card) 44'; Nyemchaninov (yellow card) 61'; Snurnitsyn (yellow card) 69'; Tsymbalyuk (yellow card) 90+2'	Stadium: Zirka Stadium; Attendance: 1,393; Referee: Kostyantyn Trukhanov

6 May 2018 30	Olimpik Donetsk	0–2	Stal Kamianske	Kyiv
14:00 EEST (UTC+03:00)	Vakulenko (yellow card) 12'; Kulynych (yellow card) 29'; Sondey (yellow card) 48'; Doronin (yellow card) 57' (red card) 59'	Report	Gor Malakyan (yellow card) 43'; Kuzyk 79'; Yakymiv (yellow card) 85'; Kopytov 90+1'	Stadium: Dynamo Stadium; Attendance: 435; Referee: Ihor Paskhal

12 May 2018 31	Olimpik Donetsk	1–0	Chornomorets Odesa	Kyiv
17:00 EEST (UTC+03:00)	Kozlov (yellow card) 24'; Kulynych (yellow card) 76'; Lyulka 88' (o.g.)	Report	Chorniy (yellow card) 17'	Stadium: Dynamo Stadium; Attendance: 490; Referee: Mykola Kryvonosov

19 May 2018 32	FC Oleksandriya	2–0	Olimpik Donetsk	Oleksandriya
17:00 EEST (UTC+03:00)	Pashayev (yellow card) 18'; Protasov (yellow card) 26'; Shendrik (yellow card) 35'; Hrytsuk 55' (pen.); Stetskov 80'	Report	Kychak (yellow card) 54'; Pasich (yellow card) 58'; Apostoliuk (yellow card) 65'; Schastlyvtsev (yellow card) 75'	Stadium: CSC Nika Stadium; Attendance: 1,300; Referee: Mykola Balakin

- ^{a} Match suspended after 1st half due to adverse weather conditions. 2nd half scheduled for February 21

=== Ukrainian Cup ===
25 October 2017 Round of 16 (1/8)	Vorskla Poltava	2–0	Olimpik Donetsk	Poltava
17:00 EEST (UTC+03:00)	Sklyar (yellow card) 101'; Sharpar 104'; Kulach 109'	Report	Shabanov (yellow card) 75'; Illoy-Ayyet (yellow card) 88'	Stadium: Vorskla Stadium; Attendance: 2,000; Referee: Oleksandr Derdo

=== UEFA Europa League ===
27 July 2017 3Q	Olimpik Donetsk (Ukraine)	1–1	(Greece) PAOK	Kyiv
19:30 EEST (UTC+03:00)	Bilenkyi 49'; Kravchenko (yellow card) 70'	Report	Shakhov (yellow card) 53'; Henrique 59'; Leovac (yellow card) 73'	Stadium: Dynamo Stadium; Attendance: 2,632; Referee: Alain Bieri

3 August 2017 3Q	PAOK (Greece)	2–0	(Ukraine) Olimpik Donetsk	Thessaloniki, Greece
21:00 EEST (UTC+03:00)	Mak 24'; Cimirot 45+1'; Leovac (yellow card) 60'	Report	Nyemchaninov (yellow card) 4'; Tsymbalyuk (yellow card) 51'; Kravchenko (yellow card) 58'	Stadium: Toumba Stadium; Referee: Ivaylo Stoyanov

== Statistics ==
=== Appearances and goals ===
No.	Pos	Nat	Player	Total		Premier League		Cup		Europa League	
No.	Pos	Nat	Player	Apps	Goals	Apps	Goals	Apps	Goals	Apps	Goals
Goalkeepers
1	GK	(Georgia (country)) GEO	Zauri Makharadze	26	0	24	0	0	0	2	0
13	GK	(Ukraine) UKR	Artem Kychak	9	0	8	0	1	0	0	0
Defenders
5	DF	(Ukraine) UKR	Andriy Mishchenko	3	0	3	0	0	0	0	0
18	DF	(Ukraine) UKR	Zurab Ochigava	13	1	8+5	1	0	0	0	0
21	DF	(Ukraine) UKR	Nazar Yedynak	2	0	0+1	0	1	0	0	0
23	DF	(Ukraine) UKR	Dmytro Nyemchaninov	16	1	10+4	1	0	0	2	0
24	DF	(Ukraine) UKR	Vadym Schastlyvtsev	1	0	1	0	0	0	0	0
32	DF	(Republic of the Congo) CGO	Vladis-Emmerson Illoy-Ayyet	17	0	11+5	0	1	0	0	0
44	DF	(Ukraine) UKR	Yevhen Tsymbalyuk	25	0	20+2	0	1	0	2	0
74	DF	(Ukraine) UKR	Ihor Snurnitsyn	5	0	5	0	0	0	0	0
79	DF	(Ukraine) UKR	Serhiy Vakulenko	10	0	9+1	0	0	0	0	0
88	DF	(Georgia (country)) GEO	Luka Nadiradze	1	0	1	0	0	0	0	0
89	DF	(Ukraine) UKR	Artem Kozlov	3	0	3	0	0	0	0	0
95	DF	(Ukraine) UKR	Serhiy Kulynych	10	0	8+2	0	0	0	0	0
Midfielders
7	MF	(Ukraine) UKR	Ivan Sondey	26	1	20+3	1	0+1	0	0+2	0
8	MF	(Ukraine) UKR	Volodymyr Doronin	12	0	8+3	0	0+1	0	0	0
9	MF	(Ukraine) UKR	Ruslan Kisil	12	1	7+5	1	0	0	0	0
11	MF	(Ukraine) UKR	Artem Schedryi	8	1	4+4	1	0	0	0	0
17	MF	(Ukraine) UKR	Vitaliy Balashov	7	0	4+3	0	0	0	0	0
20	MF	(Brazil) BRA	Leônidas	9	0	2+7	0	0	0	0	0
27	MF	(Ukraine) UKR	Ivan Brikner	11	1	7+4	1	0	0	0	0
41	MF	(Ukraine) UKR	Hennadiy Pasich	12	1	10+2	1	0	0	0	0
42	MF	(Ukraine) UKR	Yevhen Pasich	9	0	9	0	0	0	0	0
45	MF	(Ukraine) UKR	Vladyslav Khomutov	19	1	7+9	1	1	0	2	0
70	MF	(Ukraine) UKR	Artem Tyshchenko	1	0	1	0	0	0	0	0
92	MF	(Croatia) CRO	Josip Vuković	8	0	8	0	0	0	0	0
98	MF	(Ukraine) UKR	Vladyslav Apostoliuk	1	0	1	0	0	0	0	0
Forwards
22	FW	(Ukraine) UKR	Stanislav Bilenkyi	34	7	27+4	6	0+1	0	2	1
99	FW	(Ukraine) UKR	Yuriy Zakharkiv	3	0	1+2	0	0	0	0	0
Players transferred out during the season
2	DF	(Ukraine) UKR	Pavlo Lukyanchuk	13	0	10	0	1	0	2	0
3	DF	(Ukraine) UKR	Vyacheslav Lukhtanov	6	0	1+4	0	1	0	0	0
3	DF	(Ukraine) UKR	Temur Partsvania	7	0	5+2	0	0	0	0	0
4	DF	(Ukraine) UKR	Anton Kravchenko	18	3	16	3	0	0	2	0
9	MF	(Ukraine) UKR	Volodymyr Pryyomov	8	3	6+2	3	0	0	0	0
11	FW	(Morocco) MAR	Moha Rharsalla	20	5	17+1	5	0	0	2	0
12	FW	(Ukraine) UKR	Ilya Mikhalyov	9	0	1+5	0	1	0	0+2	0
14	MF	(Ukraine) UKR	Anton Postupalenko	10	0	6+4	0	0	0	0	0
15	DF	(Ukraine) UKR	Artem Shabanov	19	0	16	0	1	0	2	0
17	MF	(Ukraine) UKR	Serhiy Shestakov	20	0	17	0	1	0	2	0
24	DF	(Ukraine) UKR	Vitaliy Fedoriv	13	0	10+3	0	0	0	0	0
30	MF	(Brazil) BRA	Guttiner Tenorio	4	0	3+1	0	0	0	0	0
90	MF	(Ukraine) UKR	Andriy Bohdanov	19	2	16+1	2	0	0	2	0
94	MF	(Ukraine) UKR	Oleksandr Mihunov	14	0	1+10	0	1	0	0+2	0

Source: Competitions

Last updated: 19 May 2018

=== Goalscorers ===
Rank	No.	Pos	Nat	Name	Premier League	Cup	Europa League	Total
1	22	FW	(Ukraine)	Stanislav Bilenkyi	6	0	1	7
2	11	FW	(Morocco)	Moha Rharsalla	5	0	0	5
3	4	DF	(Ukraine)	Anton Kravchenko	3	0	0	3
3	9	MF	(Ukraine)	Volodymyr Pryyomov	3	0	0	3
5	90	MF	(Ukraine)	Andriy Bohdanov	2	0	0	2
6	7	MF	(Ukraine)	Ivan Sondey	1	0	0	1
6	9	MF	(Ukraine)	Ruslan Kisil	1	0	0	1
6	11	MF	(Ukraine)	Artem Schedryi	1	0	0	1
6	18	DF	(Ukraine)	Zurab Ochigava	1	0	0	1
6	23	DF	(Ukraine)	Dmytro Nyemchaninov	1	0	0	1
6	27	MF	(Ukraine)	Ivan Brikner	1	0	0	1
6	41	MF	(Ukraine)	Hennadiy Pasich	1	0	0	1
6	45	MF	(Ukraine)	Vladyslav Khomutov	1	0	0	1
				Own goal	2	0	0	2
				Total	29	0	1	30

Last updated: 19 May 2018

=== Clean sheets ===
Rank	No.	Pos	Nat	Name	Premier League	Cup	Europa League	Total
1	1	GK	(Georgia (country))	Zauri Makharadze	9	0	0	9
2	13	GK	(Ukraine)	Artem Kychak	4	0	0	4
				Total	13	0	0	13

Last updated: 19 May 2018

=== Disciplinary record ===
No.	Pos	Nat	Player	Premier League			Cup			Europa League			Total		
No.	Pos	Nat	Player	Booked	(yellow card) (yellow-red card)	Sent off (straight red)	Booked	(yellow card) (yellow-red card)	Sent off (straight red)	Booked	(yellow card) (yellow-red card)	Sent off (straight red)	Booked	(yellow card) (yellow-red card)	Sent off (straight red)
1	GK	(Georgia (country))	Zauri Makharadze	3	0	0	0	0	0	0	0	0	3	0	0
2	DF	(Ukraine)	Pavlo Lukyanchuk	2	0	0	0	0	0	0	0	0	2	0	0
3	DF	(Ukraine)	Vyacheslav Lukhtanov	2	0	0	0	0	0	0	0	0	2	0	0
3	DF	(Ukraine)	Temur Partsvania	1	0	0	0	0	0	0	0	0	1	0	0
4	DF	(Ukraine)	Anton Kravchenko	7	0	0	0	0	0	2	0	0	9	0	0
5	DF	(Ukraine)	Andriy Mischenko	1	0	0	0	0	0	0	0	0	1	0	0
7	MF	(Ukraine)	Ivan Sondey	1	0	0	0	0	0	0	0	0	1	0	0
8	MF	(Ukraine)	Volodymyr Doronin	4	0	1	0	0	0	0	0	0	4	0	1
9	MF	(Ukraine)	Ruslan Kisil	2	0	0	0	0	0	0	0	0	2	0	0
9	MF	(Ukraine)	Volodymyr Pryyomov	1	0	0	0	0	0	0	0	0	1	0	0
11	FW	(Morocco)	Moha Rharsalla	4	0	0	0	0	0	0	0	0	4	0	0
12	FW	(Ukraine)	Ilya Mikhalyov	1	0	0	0	0	0	0	0	0	1	0	0
13	GK	(Ukraine)	Artem Kychak	1	0	0	0	0	0	0	0	0	1	0	0
14	MF	(Ukraine)	Anton Postupalenko	3	0	0	0	0	0	0	0	0	3	0	0
15	DF	(Ukraine)	Artem Shabanov	6	0	0	1	0	0	0	0	0	7	0	0
17	MF	(Ukraine)	Serhiy Shestakov	2	0	0	0	0	0	0	0	0	2	0	0
18	DF	(Ukraine)	Zurab Ochigava	4	2	0	0	0	0	0	0	0	4	2	0
22	FW	(Ukraine)	Stanislav Bilenkyi	2	0	0	0	0	0	0	0	0	2	0	0
23	DF	(Ukraine)	Dmytro Nyemchaninov	2	0	0	0	0	0	1	0	0	3	0	0
24	DF	(Ukraine)	Vitaliy Fedoriv	5	0	0	0	0	0	0	0	0	5	0	0
24	DF	(Ukraine)	Vadym Schastlyvtsev	1	0	0	0	0	0	0	0	0	1	0	0
27	MF	(Ukraine)	Ivan Brikner	3	0	0	0	0	0	0	0	0	3	0	0
30	MF	(Brazil)	Guttiner Tenorio	1	0	0	0	0	0	0	0	0	1	0	0
32	DF	(Republic of the Congo)	Vladis-Emmerson Illoy-Ayyet	4	0	0	1	0	0	0	0	0	5	0	0
41	MF	(Ukraine)	Hennadiy Pasich	5	0	0	0	0	0	0	0	0	5	0	0
42	MF	(Ukraine)	Yevhen Pasich	2	0	0	0	0	0	0	0	0	2	0	0
44	DF	(Ukraine)	Yevhen Tsymbalyuk	6	0	0	0	0	0	1	0	0	7	0	0
74	DF	(Ukraine)	Ihor Snurnitsyn	1	0	0	0	0	0	0	0	0	1	0	0
79	MF	(Ukraine)	Serhiy Vakulenko	4	0	0	0	0	0	0	0	0	4	0	0
89	DF	(Ukraine)	Artem Kozlov	1	0	0	0	0	0	0	0	0	1	0	0
90	MF	(Ukraine)	Andriy Bohdanov	4	0	0	0	0	0	0	0	0	4	0	0
92	MF	(Croatia)	Josip Vuković	1	0	0	0	0	0	0	0	0	1	0	0
95	DF	(Ukraine)	Serhiy Kulynych	3	0	0	0	0	0	0	0	0	3	0	0
98	MF	(Ukraine)	Vladyslav Apostoliuk	1	0	0	0	0	0	0	0	0	1	0	0
99	FW	(Ukraine)	Yuriy Zakharkiv	1	0	0	0	0	0	0	0	0	1	0	0
			Total	92	2	1	2	0	0	4	0	0	98	2	1

Last updated: 19 May 2018
