= Artem Kozlov =

Artem Kozlov may refer to:

- Artem Kozlov (footballer, born 1992), Ukrainian football midfielder
- Artem Kozlov (footballer, born 1997), Ukrainian football defender
