= Kornyev =

Kornyev, female Kornyeva, (Ukrainian: Корнєв) is a Ukrainian surname. Notable people with the surname include:

- Andriy Kornyev, Ukrainian football manager and player
- Illya Kornyev, Ukrainian football player
