= Volodymyr Fedoriv =

Ukrainian footballer (born 1985)

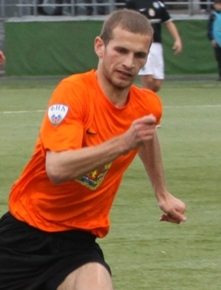
- Fedoriv in 2011

Personal information
- Full name: Volodymyr Mykolayovych Fedoriv
- Date of birth: 29 July 1985 (age 41)
- Place of birth: Mezhiricha, Lviv Oblast, Ukraine
- Height: 1.79 m (5 ft 10 1/2 in)
- Position: Defender

Senior career*
Years	Team	Apps	(Gls)
2004–2005	Karpaty-2 Lviv	16	(0)
2005–2006	Halychyna-Karpaty Lviv	25	(0)
2006–2009	Karpaty Lviv	89	(0)
2009–2010	Chornomorets Odesa	17	(0)
2011–2012	Yenisey Krasnoyarsk	35	(2)
2013–2014	Sevastopol	41	(0)
2014–2015	Wisła Puławy	17	(1)
2016–2017	Rukh Vynnyky	16	(0)
2017–2018	Uzhhorod		
2018–2021	Yunist Verkhnya Bilka		
2021–2022	Mykolaiv		
2023	Blaho-Yunist Verkhnya		

International career
2005	Ukraine U21	1	(0)
- * Club domestic league appearances and goals

Volodymyr Mykolayovych Fedoriv (Ukrainian: Володимир Миколайович Федорів, born 29 July 1985) is a Ukrainian former professional footballer who played as a defender.

== Career ==
He previously played for Sevastopol, Karpaty Lviv. His brother Vitaliy Fedoriv and stepbrother Rostyslav Rusyn are also football players.
