= Rostyslav Rusyn =

Ukrainian footballer

Personal information
- Full name: Rostyslav Ihorovych Rusyn
- Date of birth: 26 October 1995 (age 31)
- Place of birth: Zhydachiv, Ukraine
- Height: 1.74 m (5 ft 8 1/2 in)
- Position: Midfielder

Team information
- Current team: Feniks-Mariupol
- Number: 99

Youth career
- 200?–2008: Youth Sportive School Zhydachiv
- 2008–2011: RVUFK Kyiv
- 2011–2012: Shakhtar Donetsk

Senior career*
Years	Team	Apps	(Gls)
2012–2017	Shakhtar Donetsk	0	(0)
2017–2018	Spartaks Jūrmala	1	(0)
2018–2021	Rukh Lviv	63	(4)
2021–2024	Metalist 1925 Kharkiv	43	(6)
2025–2026	Chornomorets Odesa	2	(0)
2026	Feniks-Mariupol	3	(0)
2026-	FC Prykarpattia Ivano-Frankivsk (1998)	8	(1)

International career^{‡}
2010	Ukraine U16	1	(0)
- * Club domestic league appearances and goals as of 3/11/26 @ 13:05(AEST) ‡ National team caps and goals as of 3 July 2021

Rostyslav Ihorovych Rusyn (Ukrainian: Ростислав Ігорович Русин; born 26 October 1995) is a Ukrainian professional footballer for Ukrainian First League club Feniks-Mariupol.

== Club career ==
Rusyn is a product of Youth Sportive school in his native Zhydachiv (first trainer was Volodymyr Sapuha) and also RVUFK Kyiv and Shakhtar Donetsk youth sportive school systems.

After spent five seasons in the Shakhtar youth team and played in the Ukrainian Premier League Reserves, he was transferred to Latvia. Returned to Ukraine and signed a contract with Rukh Lviv in August 2018.

On 13 July 2025, Rusyn joined Chornomorets Odesa. On 24 September 2025 in the round of 32 of the 2025–26 Ukrainian Cup between Ahrotekh Tyshkivka and Chornomorets he made his official debut as player of Chornomorets. On 1 January 2026, Rusyn left Chornomorets Odesa. On 14 February 2026, he joined Feniks-Mariupol.

== International career ==
Rusyn was called up to the Ukraine national under-16 football team in October 2010 and played as a second-half substituted player in the 2-1 winning match against Denmark on October 14, 2020 in the International youth tournament in Latina, Lazio, Italy.

== Personal life ==
Rusyn is a stepbrother of another Ukrainian football players, Volodymyr Fedoriv (born 1985) and Vitaliy Fedoriv (born 1987).
