= Artem Shabanov =

Ukrainian footballer

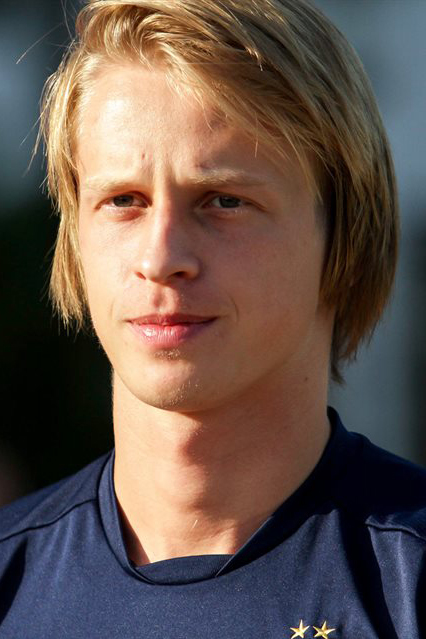

Personal information
- Full name: Artem Mykhaylovych Shabanov
- Date of birth: 7 March 1992 (age 34)
- Place of birth: Kyiv, Ukraine
- Height: 1.90 m (6 ft 3 in)
- Position: Centre-back

Team information
- Current team: Metalist 1925 Kharkiv
- Number: 31

Youth career
- 2005–2007: Dynamo Kyiv
- 2007–2009: Arsenal Kyiv

Senior career*
Years	Team	Apps	(Gls)
2009–2013	Arsenal Kyiv	2	(0)
2014–2016	Volyn Lutsk	60	(1)
2017	Stal Kamianske	13	(0)
2017	Olimpik Donetsk	16	(0)
2018–2022	Dynamo Kyiv	58	(2)
2021	→ Legia Warsaw (loan)	7	(0)
2022–2023	Fehérvár	16	(0)
2023–2024	Polissya Zhytomyr	24	(0)
2024–2025	Oleksandriya	29	(1)
2025–	Metalist 1925 Kharkiv	28	(1)

International career
2010	Ukraine U18	4	(0)
2010	Ukraine U19	5	(0)
2017–2019	Ukraine	2	(0)
- * Club domestic league appearances and goals as of 3 June 2026

Artem Mykhaylovych Shabanov (Ukrainian: Артем Михайлович Шабанов; born 7 March 1992) is a Ukrainian professional footballer who plays as a centre-back for Metalist 1925 Kharkiv.

== Career ==
Shabanov is a product of FC Dynamo and FC Arsenal Sportive Schools in Kyiv.

Made his debut for FC Arsenal played full game against FC Sevastopol on 30 September 2013 in Ukrainian Premier League.

On 10 July 2024, Shabanov signed a two-season contract with Oleksandriya.

== Career statistics ==
=== Club ===
As of 30 October 2021

Appearances and goals by club, season and competition
Club	Season	League			National cup (Note: Includes Ukrainian Cup, Polish Cup)		Continental		Other		Total	
Club	Season	Division	Apps	Goals	Apps	Goals	Apps	Goals	Apps	Goals	Apps	Goals
Arsenal Kyiv	2013–14	Ukrainian Premier League	2	0	0	0	—		—		2	0
Volyn Lutsk	2013–14	Ukrainian Premier League	3	0	0	0	—		—		3	0
Volyn Lutsk	2014–15	Ukrainian Premier League	22	1	3	0	—		—		25	1
Volyn Lutsk	2015–16	Ukrainian Premier League	21	0	4	0	—		—		25	0
Volyn Lutsk	2016–17	Ukrainian Premier League	14	0	2	0	—		—		16	0
Volyn Lutsk	Total		60	1	9	0	0	0	0	0	69	1
Stal Kamianske	2016–17	Ukrainian Premier League	13	0	0	0	—		—		13	0
Olimpik Donetsk	2017–18	Ukrainian Premier League	16	0	1	0	2 (Note: Appearance(s) in UEFA Europa League)	0	—		19	0
Dynamo Kyiv	2017–18	Ukrainian Premier League	8	0	1	0	1	0	0	0	10	0
Dynamo Kyiv	2018–19	Ukrainian Premier League	17	0	1	0	4 (Note: One appearance in UEFA Champions League, three appearances in UEFA Europa League)	0	0	0	22	0
Dynamo Kyiv	2019–20	Ukrainian Premier League	26	2	4	0	5	1	0	0	35	3
Dynamo Kyiv	2020–21	Ukrainian Premier League	1	0	0	0	1 (Note: Appearance in UEFA Champions League)	0	0	0	2	0
Dynamo Kyiv	2021–22	Ukrainian Premier League	6	0	1	1	1	0	0	0	8	1
Dynamo Kyiv	Total		58	2	7	1	12	1	0	0	77	4
Legia Warsaw (loan)	2020–21	Ekstraklasa	7	0	1	0	—		—		8	0
Fehérvár	2021–22	Nemzeti Bajnokság I	11	0	0	0	0	0	—		11	0
Career total			167	3	18	1	14	1	0	0	199	5

=== International ===
Appearances and goals by national team and year
National team	Year	Apps	Goals
Ukraine	2017	1	0
Ukraine	2018	0	0
Ukraine	2019	1	0
Total		2	0

== Honours ==
Dynamo Kyiv

- Ukrainian Super Cup: 2018
- Ukrainian Cup: 2019–20

Legia Warsaw

- Ekstraklasa: 2020–21
