= Bohdan Stepanenko =

Ukrainian footballer

Personal information
- Full name: Bohdan Ivanovych Stepanenko
- Date of birth: 13 April 1996 (age 30)
- Place of birth: Kyiv, Ukraine
- Height: 1.87 m (6 ft 2 in)
- Position: Goalkeeper

Team information
- Current team: Bukovyna Chernivtsi
- Number: 1

Youth career
- 2006–2009: DYuSSh-15 Kyiv
- 2009–2010: Atlet Kyiv
- 2010: DYuSSh-15 Kyiv
- 2010–2011: Atlet Kyiv
- 2012–2013: DYuSSh-15 Kyiv

Senior career*
Years	Team	Apps	(Gls)
2014–2016	Metalist Kharkiv	0	(0)
2016–2017	Olimpik Donetsk	0	(0)
2017	Nyva Ternopil	0	(0)
2018–2019	Bukovyna Chernivtsi	27	(0)
2021–2022	Dovbush Chernivtsi	15	(0)
2022–	Bukovyna Chernivtsi	4	(0)

Managerial career
- 2022–: Bukovyna Chernivtsi (goalkeeping coach)
- * Club domestic league appearances and goals as of 21 April 2023

Bohdan Ivanovych Stepanenko (Ukrainian: Богдан Іванович Степаненко; born 13 April 1996) is a Ukrainian professional footballer who plays as a goalkeeper for Ukrainian First League club Bukovyna Chernivtsi and currently also a goalkeeping coach at the club.
