= Serhiy Kulynych =

Ukrainian footballer (born 1995)

Personal information
- Full name: Serhiy Viktorovych Kulynych
- Date of birth: 9 January 1995 (age 31)
- Place of birth: Mala Tokmachka, Ukraine
- Height: 1.81 m (5 ft 11 1/2 in)
- Position: Right-back

Team information
- Current team: Muras United

Youth career
- 2008–2014: Metalurh Zaporizhya

Senior career*
Years	Team	Apps	(Gls)
2014–2015	Metalurh Zaporizhya	17	(0)
2016–2017	Minsk	42	(1)
2018	Olimpik Donetsk	10	(0)
2018	Spartak Subotica	3	(0)
2019–2020	Metalurh Zaporizhya	14	(0)
2020–2021	Mykolaiv	30	(1)
2023	Chełmianka Chełm	15	(1)
2023–2025	Džiugas	52	(3)
2025–	Muras United	32	(3)

International career
2015	Ukraine U20	3	(0)
- * Club domestic league appearances and goals

Serhiy Viktorovych Kulynych (Ukrainian: Сергій Вікторович Кулинич; born 9 January 1995) is a Ukrainian professional footballer who plays as a right-back.

== Career ==
Kulynych is a product of youth team system Metalurh Zaporizhya. His first trainer was Oleksandr Rudyka.

Made his debut for Metalurh in the main-squad playing against FC Hoverla Uzhhorod on 1 March 2015 in the Ukrainian Premier League.

He then played for Belarusian side Minsk.

In the summer of 2018, he signed with Serbian side FK Spartak Subotica and played with them in the 2018–19 Serbian SuperLiga.
