= Volodymyr Tanchyk =

Ukrainian footballer (born 1991)

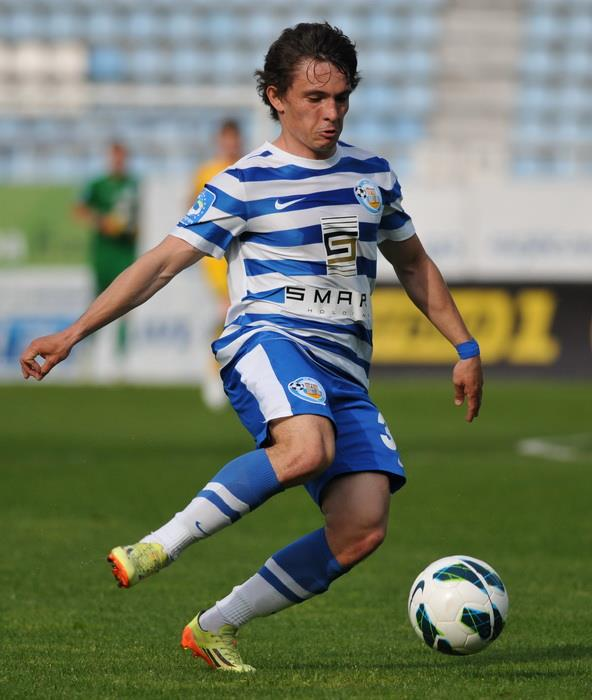

Personal information
- Full name: Volodymyr Romanovych Tanchyk
- Date of birth: 17 October 1991 (age 35)
- Place of birth: Cherkasy, Ukraine
- Height: 1.68 m (5 ft 6 in)
- Position: Right midfielder

Team information
- Current team: Epitsentr Kamianets-Podilskyi
- Number: 34

Youth career
- 2005–2008: Knyazha Shchaslyve
- 2008: Arsenal Kyiv

Senior career*
Years	Team	Apps	(Gls)
2008	Knyazha Shchaslyve	10	(0)
2008	→ Knyazha-2 Shchaslyve	9	(0)
2009–2011	Lviv	51	(3)
2009–2010	→ Lviv-2	3	(1)
2011–2014	Sevastopol	72	(12)
2014–2015	Ruch Chorzów	3	(0)
2015	Górnik Łęczna	5	(0)
2015–2016	Olimpik Donetsk	35	(3)
2017	Gyirmót	3	(0)
2017–2018	Stomil Olsztyn	36	(5)
2019	Chornomorets Odesa	24	(5)
2020	Karpaty Lviv	2	(0)
2020–2022	Metalist Kharkiv	37	(5)
2022–2024	Dnipro-1	41	(1)
2024–	Epitsentr Kamianets-Podilskyi	25	(2)

International career
2007	Ukraine U16	1	(0)
2007	Ukraine U17	3	(1)
2008	Ukraine U18	1	(0)
- * Club domestic league appearances and goals as of 3 June 2026

Volodymyr Romanovych Tanchyk (Ukrainian: Володимир Романович Танчик; born 17 October 1991) is a Ukrainian professional footballer who plays as a right midfielder for Epitsentr Kamianets-Podilskyi.
