= Vyacheslav Lukhtanov =

Ukrainian footballer (born 1995)

Personal information
- Full name: Vyacheslav Hennadiyovych Lukhtanov
- Date of birth: 12 February 1995 (age 31)
- Place of birth: Lutuhyne, Luhansk Oblast, Ukraine
- Height: 1.91 m (6 ft 3 in)
- Position: Defender

Youth career
- 2004–2011: Dynamo Kyiv

Senior career*
Years	Team	Apps	(Gls)
2011–2015	Dynamo Kyiv	0	(0)
2012–2014	→ Dynamo-2 Kyiv	38	(2)
2015	→ Hoverla Uzhhorod (loan)	17	(0)
2016	Helios Kharkiv	6	(0)
2016–2017	Veres Rivne	10	(0)
2017	Olimpik Donetsk	5	(0)
2018	Smolevichi	9	(1)
2020	Cherkashchyna	11	(1)

International career^{‡}
2010–2011	Ukraine U16	14	(2)
2010–2012	Ukraine U17	13	(0)
2012	Ukraine U18	3	(0)
- * Club domestic league appearances and goals as of 20 August 2020 ‡ National team caps and goals as of 2 March 2018

Vyacheslav Lukhtanov (Ukrainian: В'ячеслав Геннадійович Лухтанов; born 12 February 1995) is a Ukrainian former football defender who most recently played for Cherkashchyna.

== Career ==
Lukhtanov is a product of the FC Dynamo youth sportive school. His first trainers were Oleksandr Shpakov and Yevhen Rudakov.

He spent his career in the Ukrainian First League club FC Dynamo-2 Kyiv. And in February 2015 went on loan for FC Hoverla in the Ukrainian Premier League.
