= Illya Kornyev =

Ukrainian footballer

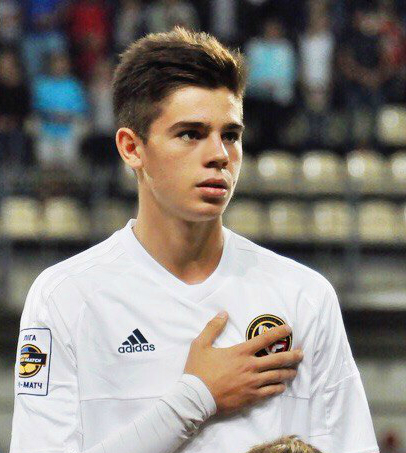

Personal information
- Full name: Illya Vitaliyovych Kornyev
- Date of birth: 1 November 1996 (age 30)
- Place of birth: Zaporizhzhia, Ukraine
- Height: 1.83 m (6 ft 0 in)
- Position: Midfielder

Team information
- Current team: Uzhhorod
- Number: 17

Youth career
- 2009–2013: Metalurh Zaporizhzhia

Senior career*
Years	Team	Apps	(Gls)
2013–2016	Metalurh Zaporizhzhia	11	(1)
2016	Metalist Kharkiv	4	(1)
2016	Olimpik Donetsk	5	(1)
2017–2019	Metalurh Zaporizhzhia	43	(10)
2019–2020	Aiolikos		
2020	GOŠK Gabela		
2020–2021	Peremoha Dnipro	6	(0)
2021–	Uzhhorod	1	(0)

International career^{‡}
2016	Ukraine U21	2	(0)
- * Club domestic league appearances and goals as of 13 November 2021 ‡ National team caps and goals as of 19 November 2021

Illya Vitaliyovych Kornyev (Ukrainian: Ілля Віталійович Корнєв; born 1 November 1996) is a Ukrainian professional football midfielder who plays for Uzhhorod.

== Career ==
Kornyev is a product of the FC Metalurh Zaporizhzhia youth team system. His first trainer was Mykola Syenovalov.

He made his debut for Metalurh Zaporizhzhia in the Ukrainian Premier League in a match against FC Oleksandriya on 26 July 2015.
