= Yaroslav Oliinyk =

Ukrainian footballer

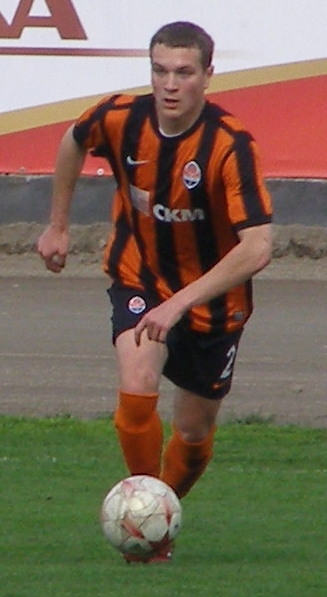

Personal information
- Full name: Yaroslav Vadymovych Oliinyk
- Date of birth: 14 March 1991 (age 35)
- Place of birth: Donetsk, Ukrainian SSR, Soviet Union
- Height: 1.78 m (5 ft 10 in)
- Position: Defender

Youth career
- 2004–2008: Shakhtar Donetsk

Senior career*
Years	Team	Apps	(Gls)
2008–2014	Shakhtar Donetsk	0	(0)
2008	→ Shakhtar-3 Donetsk	7	(0)
2011–2014	→ Zorya Luhansk (loan)	20	(0)
2014–2015	Olimpik Donetsk	3	(0)
2015	Chornomorets Odesa	4	(0)
2015–2016	Illichivets Mariupol	14	(0)
2016–2017	Olimpik Donetsk	20	(0)
2017	Tom Tomsk	5	(0)
2018	Castellón	5	(0)
2020–2021	Cherkashchyna	17	(1)
2021	Viktoriya Mykolaivka		
2021–2022	Polissya Stavky		

International career
2008	Ukraine-18	1	(0)
2009–2010	Ukraine-19	8	(0)
2010	Ukraine-20	1	(0)
2011–2012	Ukraine-21	6	(0)
- * Club domestic league appearances and goals as of 31 December 2018

Yaroslav Oliinyk (Ukrainian: Ярослав Вадимович Олійник, born 14 March 1991) is a Ukrainian footballer who plays as a defender.

== Career ==
Oliinyk after playing for FC Shakhtar Donetsk reserves team from June 2011 plays during one year on loan for FC Zorya .

In the 2020–21 season, Oliinyk played for FC Cherkashchyna. In April 2021, he joined Viktoriya Mykolaivka. In the 2021–22 season, he played for Polissya Stavky.
