= Vitaliy Fedoriv (footballer) =

Ukrainian football defender

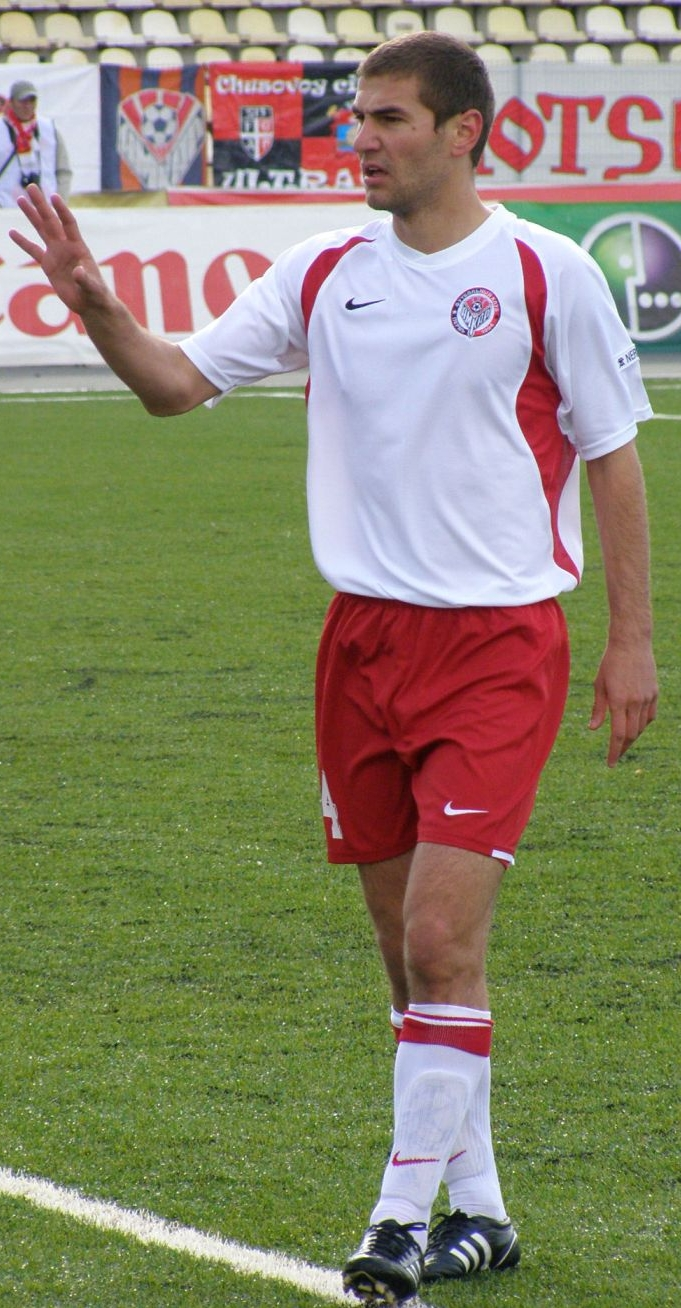
- Fedoriv in 2009

Personal information
- Full name: Vitaliy Mykolayovych Fedoriv
- Date of birth: 21 October 1987 (age 39)
- Place of birth: Mezhyrichchia, Zhydachiv Raion, Lviv Oblast, Ukrainian SSR, Soviet Union
- Height: 1.80 m (5 ft 11 in)
- Position: Left back

Team information
- Current team: Metalist Kharkiv
- Number: 42

Youth career
- 2001–2003: VPU-21 Ivano-Frankivsk
- 2003–2004: RVUFK Kyiv

Senior career*
| Years | Team | Apps | (Gls) |
| 2004–2008 | Dynamo Kyiv | 5 | (1) |
| 2004–2005 | → Dynamo-3 Kyiv | 16 | (3) |
| 2005–2007 | → Dynamo-2 Kyiv | 53 | (2) |
| 2008 | → Amkar Perm (loan) | 12 | (0) |
| 2009–2011 | Amkar Perm | 29 | (0) |
| 2012–2013 | Kryvbas Kryvyi Rih | 6 | (0) |
| 2014–2015 | Spartaks Jūrmala | 7 | (0) |
| 2015 | Hoverla Uzhhorod | 1 | (0) |
| 2015–2017 | Olimpik Donetsk | 40 | (0) |
| 2018–2019 | Nizhny Novgorod | 49 | (0) |
| 2020– | Metalist Kharkiv | 88 | (10) |
| 2023 | → Dnipro-1 (loan) | 0 | (0) |

International career^{‡}
| 2005 | Ukraine U19 | 5 | (0) |
| 2006–2008 | Ukraine U21 | 12 | (1) |
| 2008–2011 | Ukraine | 2 | (0) |
- * Club domestic league appearances and goals as of 4 June 2026 ‡ National team caps and goals as of 22 February 2018

Vitaliy Mykolayovych Fedoriv (Ukrainian: Віталій Миколайович Федорів; born 21 October 1987) is a Ukrainian professional footballer who plays as a defender for Metalist Kharkiv.

== Club career ==
He was with FC Dynamo Kyiv from 2004 until 2009 and was first called up to the main squad in the 2006–07 season. His brother Volodymyr Fedoriv is also a professional football player.

== Personal life ==
Fedoriv is a brother of Ukrainian football player Volodymyr Fedoriv (born 1985) and a stepbrother of another Ukrainian football player Rostyslav Rusyn (born 1995).
