= Zauri Makharadze =

Ukrainian-born Georgian football goalkeeper

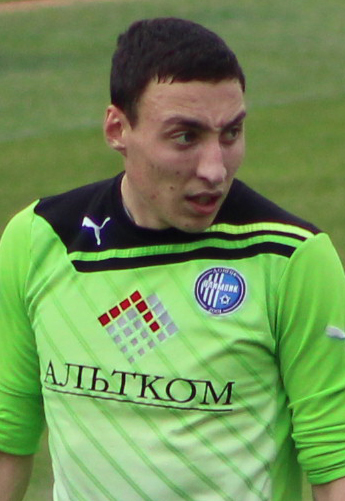
- Makharadze with Olimpik Donetsk in 2014

Personal information
- Full name: Zauri Anzorovych Makharadze
- Date of birth: 24 March 1993 (age 33)
- Place of birth: Balta, Ukraine
- Height: 1.86 m (6 ft 1 in)
- Position: Goalkeeper

Youth career
- 2006–2010: Olimpik Donetsk

Senior career*
Years	Team	Apps	(Gls)
2010–2018	Olimpik Donetsk	133	(0)
2018–2020	Zorya Luhansk	20	(0)
2021	Dnipro-1	0	(0)
2021	Polissya Zhytomyr	17	(0)

International career^{‡}
2009	Ukraine-16	1	(0)
2009–2010	Ukraine-17	11	(0)
2010	Ukraine-18	1	(0)
2014	Ukraine-21	5	(0)
- * Club domestic league appearances and goals as of 24 December 2021 ‡ National team caps and goals as of 24 May 2018

Zauri Anzorovych Makharadze (Ukrainian: Заурі Анзорович Махарадзе, Georgian: ზაური ანზორის ძე მახარაძე; born 24 March 1993) is a Ukrainian-born Georgian football goalkeeper.

== Career ==
With Olimpik, he won the 2013–14 Ukrainian First League and promotion to the Ukrainian Premier League.

Makharadze was called up for Ukraine u21 team in January 2014 for the 2014 Commonwealth of Independent States Cup.

In 2018 he acquired Georgian citizenship and in May 2018 he was called-up in the Georgia national football team.

On 24 May 2018 manager Roman Sanzhar of Olimpik Donetsk announced that Makharadze signed a pre-contract with the Ukrainian Premier League side Zorya Luhansk. On 25 May the transfer was officially confirmed by Zorya.
