= Vladis-Emmerson Illoy-Ayyet =

Congolese footballer

Emmerson
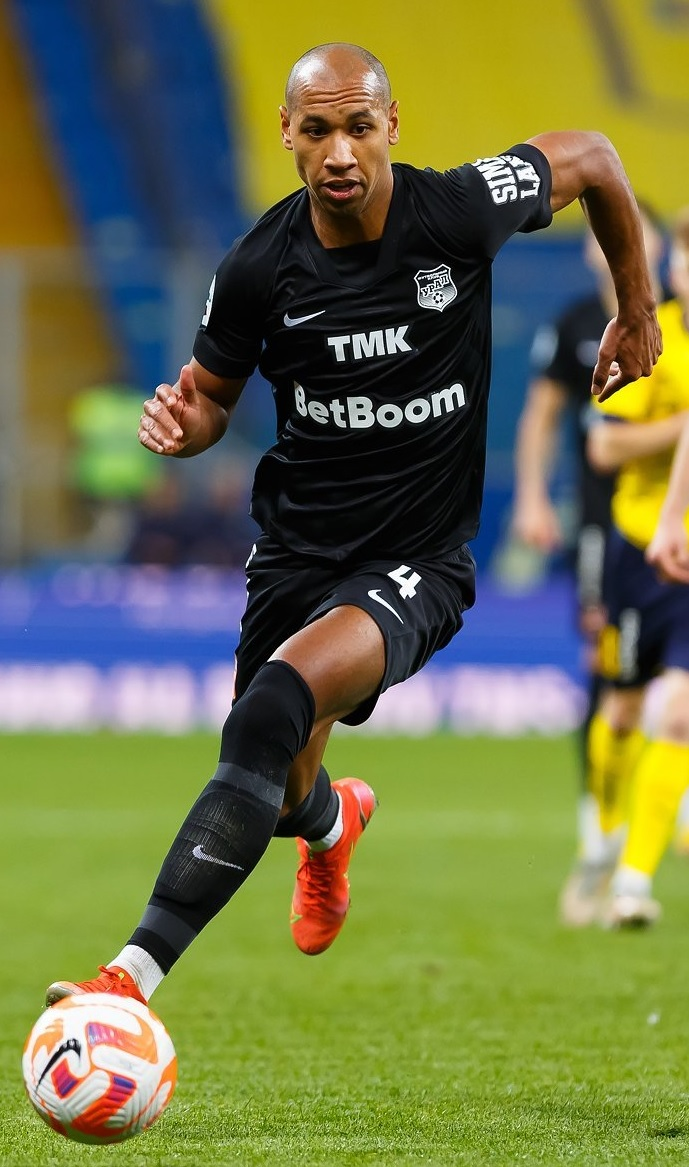
- Emmerson with Ural in 2022

Personal information
- Full name: Vladis-Emmerson Mishelevych Illoy-Ayyet
- Date of birth: 7 October 1995 (age 31)
- Place of birth: Odesa, Ukraine
- Height: 1.95 m (6 ft 5 in)
- Position: Centre-back

Team information
- Current team: Rotor Volgograd
- Number: 25

Youth career
- 2008–2012: Chornomorets Odesa

Senior career*
Years	Team	Apps	(Gls)
2012–2015	Chornomorets Odesa	0	(0)
2015	Karpaty Lviv	0	(0)
2015	→ Nyva Ternopil (loan)	12	(0)
2015–2018	Olimpik Donetsk	40	(0)
2018–2020	Vejle BK	11	(1)
2019	→ R&F (loan)	2	(0)
2020	→ Armavir (loan)	2	(0)
2021–2022	SKA-Khabarovsk	47	(2)
2022–2024	Ural Yekaterinburg	43	(3)
2024–2026	Yenisey Krasnoyarsk	55	(0)
2026–	Rotor Volgograd	0	(0)

International career^{‡}
2012	Ukraine U17		
2017	Congo	1	(1)
- * Club domestic league appearances and goals as of 16 May 2026 ‡ National team caps and goals as of 5 September 2017

Vladis-Emmerson Mishelevych Illoy-Ayyet (Ukrainian: Владіс-Еммерсон Мішелевич Іллой-Айєт; born 7 October 1995), commonly known as Emmerson, is a professional football defender who plays for Russian First League club Rotor Volgograd. Born in Ukraine, he has represented the Republic of the Congo at senior level.

== Career ==
=== Club ===
Illoy-Ayyet is a product of the youth team system of FC Chornomorets. But he never made a debut for FC Chornomorets main-squad team; in February 2015 he signed a contract with FC Karpaty. From March 2015 he played on loan for FC Nyva Ternopil.

On 4 July 2019, Hong Kong Premier League club R&F announced the acquisition for Emmerson on a year-long loan. He left the club in January 2020 and was instead loaned out to Russian club Armavir for the rest of the season. On 15 April 2020, Armavir dropped out of the Russian Football National League due to lack of financing.

On 31 May 2022, Emmerson signed a long-term contract with Russian Premier League club Ural Yekaterinburg. He left Ural by mutual consent on 10 September 2024.

=== International ===
In August 2017 he was called up by Congo national football team for matches of 2018 FIFA World Cup qualification against Ghana.

== Career statistics ==
=== Club ===
As of match played 16 May 2026

Club	Season	League			Cup		Continental		Other		Total	
Club	Season	Division	Apps	Goals	Apps	Goals	Apps	Goals	Apps	Goals	Apps	Goals
Nyva Ternopil	2014–15	Ukrainian First League	12	0	–		–		–		12	0
Olimpik Donetsk	2015–16	Ukrainian Premier League	3	0	2	0	–		–		5	0
Olimpik Donetsk	2016–17	Ukrainian Premier League	21	0	1	0	–		–		22	0
Olimpik Donetsk	2017–18	Ukrainian Premier League	16	0	1	0	0	0	–		17	0
Olimpik Donetsk	Total		40	0	4	0	0	0	0	0	44	0
Vejle	2018–19	Danish Superliga	11	1	3	0	–		–		14	1
R&F	2019–20	Hong Kong Premier League	2	0	–		–		6 (Note: Four appearances, two goals in Sapling Cup, two appearances in Senior Shield)	2	8	2
Armavir	2019–20	Russian First League	2	0	–		–		–		2	0
SKA-Khabarovsk	2020–21	Russian First League	14	1	1	0	–		–		15	1
SKA-Khabarovsk	2021–22	Russian First League	33	1	1	0	–		2 (Note: Appearances in promotion play-offs)	1	36	2
SKA-Khabarovsk	Total		47	2	2	0	0	0	2	1	51	3
Ural Yekaterinburg	2022–23	Russian Premier League	22	1	11	0	–		–		33	1
Ural Yekaterinburg	2023–24	Russian Premier League	17	1	9	1	–		2 (Note: Appearances in relegation play-offs)	0	28	2
Ural Yekaterinburg	2024–25	Russian First League	4	1	–		–		–		4	1
Ural Yekaterinburg	Total		43	3	20	1	0	0	2	0	65	4
Yenisey Krasnoyarsk	2024–25	Russian First League	23	0	0	0	–		–		23	0
Yenisey Krasnoyarsk	2025–26	Russian First League	32	0	2	0	–		–		34	0
Yenisey Krasnoyarsk	Total		55	0	2	0	0	0	0	0	57	0
Career total			212	6	31	1	0	0	10	3	253	10

=== International goals ===
Scores and results list Congo's goal tally first.

No	Date	Venue	Opponent	Score	Result	Competition
1.	5 September 2017	Stade Municipal de Kintélé, Brazzaville, Congo	Ghana	1–2	1–5	2018 FIFA World Cup qualification

== Personal life ==
Illoy-Ayyet was born in Ukraine from a Ukrainian mother and a Congolese father.
