= Dmytro Nyemchaninov =

Ukrainian footballer

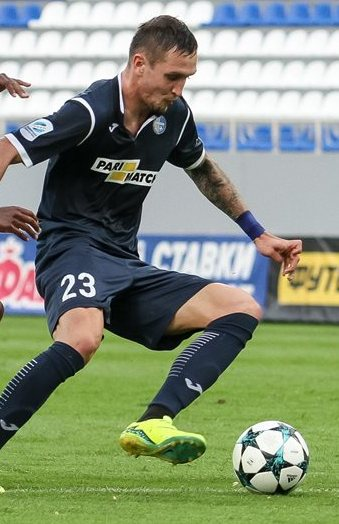

Personal information
- Full name: Dmytro Andriyovych Nyemchaninov
- Date of birth: 27 January 1990 (age 36)
- Place of birth: Kyiv, Ukrainian SSR
- Height: 1.90 m (6 ft 3 in)
- Position: Left-back

Team information
- Current team: Vilkhivtsi
- Number: 23

Youth career
- 2005–2007: RVUFK Kyiv

Senior career*
Years	Team	Apps	(Gls)
2007–2008	Dynamo Kyiv	0	(0)
2007–2008	→ Dynamo-3 Kyiv	21	(0)
2007	→ Dynamo-2 Kyiv	4	(0)
2009–2010	Dnister Ovidiopol	38	(0)
2011–2012	Nyva Vinnytsia	41	(0)
2012–2013	Zirka Kirovohrad	30	(2)
2013–2015	Volyn Lutsk	25	(1)
2015	Chornomorets Odesa	5	(0)
2016–2017	Olimpik Donetsk	39	(2)
2017–2018	Krylia Sovetov Samara	2	(0)
2018	→ Olimpik Donetsk (loan)	19	(0)
2019	Desna Chernihiv	5	(0)
2019	Rukh Lviv	17	(0)
2020	Nitra	5	(0)
2020–2021	Veres Rivne	41	(3)
2022	Peremoha Dnipro	0	(0)
2022	Fomat Martin	16	(1)
2022–2025	Mynai	51	(0)
2025–	Vilkhivtsi	44	(2)

International career
2007	Ukraine U17	4	(0)
2007–2008	Ukraine U18	5	(0)
- * Club domestic league appearances and goals as of 6 June 2026

Dmytro Andriyovych Nyemchaninov (Ukrainian: Дмитро Андрійович Нємчанінов; born 27 January 1990) is a Ukrainian professional footballer who plays as a left-back for Vilkhivtsi.

== Career ==
Nyemchaninov's first professional club was Dynamo Kyiv, but he did not play any matches for the main squad. Next he was close for signing contract with Dnister Ovidiopol in the Ukrainian First League. He made his debut in the Ukrainian Premier League for FC Volyn on 14 July 2013, playing in a match against Dynamo Kyiv. In 2019 he moved to Rukh Lviv. On 29 August 2021 he scored against Desna Chernihiv in Ukrainian Premier League in the season 2021–22 at the Stadion Yuri Gagarin.

== International career ==
He was called up to the Ukraine national under-21 football team for some matches during 2009, but was not selected for any games.

== Honours ==
Veres Rivne

- Ukrainian First League: 2020–21
