= Vadym Shchastlyvtsev =

Ukrainian footballer

Vadym Schastlyvtsev
Personal information
- Full name: Vadym Vitaliyovych Shchastlyvtsev
- Date of birth: 18 April 1998 (age 28)
- Place of birth: Putyvl, Ukraine
- Height: 1.83 m (6 ft 0 in)
- Position: Defender

Youth career
- 2011–2014: Olimpik Donetsk

Senior career*
Years	Team	Apps	(Gls)
2014–2018	Olimpik Donetsk	1	(0)
2017	→ Helios Kharkiv (loan)	17	(1)
2018	Avanhard Kramatorsk	6	(0)
2023	Shturm Ivankiv	1	(0)
2023	Lisne	6	(0)

International career
2017–	Ukraine U19	4	(0)
- * Club domestic league appearances and goals as of 22 June 2025

Vadym Vitaliyovych Shchastlyvtsev (Ukrainian: Вадим Віталійович Счастливцев; born 18 April 1998) is a Ukrainian professional football defender who has been banned for fixing games.

== Career ==
Schastlyvtsev is a product of the FC Olimpik Donetsk Youth School System.

He signed contract with FC Olimpik Donetsk in summer 2014 and played in the Ukrainian Premier League Reserves. In July 2017, he went on loan and made his debut for Helios Kharkiv in the Ukrainian First League in a match against FC Balkany Zorya on 15 July 2017.

On 21 November 2018, he was banned from competitions for participating in fixed games.
