= Serhiy Hryn (footballer) =

Ukrainian footballer

Personal information
- Full name: Serhiy Vitaliyovych Hryn
- Date of birth: 6 June 1994 (age 32)
- Place of birth: Volnovakha, Ukraine
- Height: 1.80 m (5 ft 11 in)
- Position: Winger

Team information
- Current team: Epitsentr Kamianets-Podilskyi
- Number: 11

Youth career
- 2007–2011: Shakhtar Donetsk

Senior career*
Years	Team	Apps	(Gls)
2011–2018	Shakhtar Donetsk		
2014–2015	→ Illichivets Mariupol (loan)	25	(7)
2016	→ Illichivets Mariupol (loan)	11	(3)
2016–2017	→ Olimpik Donetsk (loan)	20	(2)
2017	→ Veres Rivne (loan)	6	(0)
2018	→ Arsenal Kyiv (loan)	10	(4)
2019–2020	Vejle	35	(4)
2020–2021	Zorya Luhansk	6	(0)
2021–2022	Oleksandriya	6	(1)
2023–	Epitsentr Kamianets-Podilskyi	16	(0)

International career
2010	Ukraine U16	9	(1)
2009	Ukraine U17	3	(0)
2013	Ukraine U19	5	(0)
2015–2016	Ukraine U21	9	(0)
- * Club domestic league appearances and goals as of 20 June 2024

Serhiy Vitaliyovych Hryn (Ukrainian: Сергій Віталійович Гринь; born 6 June 1994) is a Ukrainian professional footballer who plays as a left winger for Epitsentr Kamianets-Podilskyi.

== Career ==
Hryn is product of the Shakhtar Donetsk youth academy. In June 2014, he joined Illichivets Mariupol on loan.

He made his debut in the Ukrainian Premier League on 26 July 2014, playing for Mariupol in a game against Volyn Lutsk.

Hryn was nominated as "Best Young Player" of Ukrainian Professional League.
