= Ivan Matyazh =

Ukrainian footballer

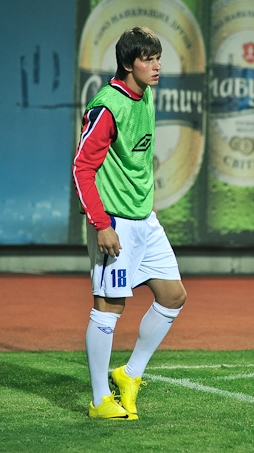

Personal information
- Full name: Ivan Serhiyovych Matyazh
- Date of birth: 15 February 1988 (age 38)
- Place of birth: Donetsk, Ukrainian SSR
- Height: 1.88 m (6 ft 2 in)
- Position: Striker

Team information
- Current team: Uskok
- Number: 19

Youth career
- 2001–2004: Shakhtar Donetsk

Senior career*
Years	Team	Apps	(Gls)
2004–2009	Shakhtar Donetsk	0	(0)
2004–2005	→ Shakhtar-2 Donetsk	18	(2)
2004–2008	→ Shakhtar-3 Donetsk	58	(13)
2007–2008	→ Zorya Luhansk (loan)	0	(0)
2009	→ Olimpik Donetsk (loan)	27	(12)
2010–2011	Tavriya Simferopol	14	(1)
2011–2012	Olimpik Donetsk	19	(10)
2012–2014	Metalurh Zaporizhya	60	(6)
2015	Illichivets Mariupol	9	(0)
2015–2017	Olimpik Donetsk	42	(9)
2017	Istra 1961	15	(1)
2018	Chornomorets Odesa	6	(1)
2018–2020	Avanhard Kramatorsk	48	(7)
2020–2022	Obolon Kyiv	46	(4)
2022–2024	Karlovac 1919	69	(34)
2024–2026	Solin	54	(29)
2026–	Uskok	0	(0)

International career
2005	Ukraine U19	3	(0)
- * Club domestic league appearances and goals as of 7 March 2025

Ivan Serhiyovych Matyazh (Ukrainian: Іван Сергійович Матяж; born 15 February 1988) is a Ukrainian professional football striker who plays for Uskok.
