= Volodymyr Doronin =

Ukrainian footballer

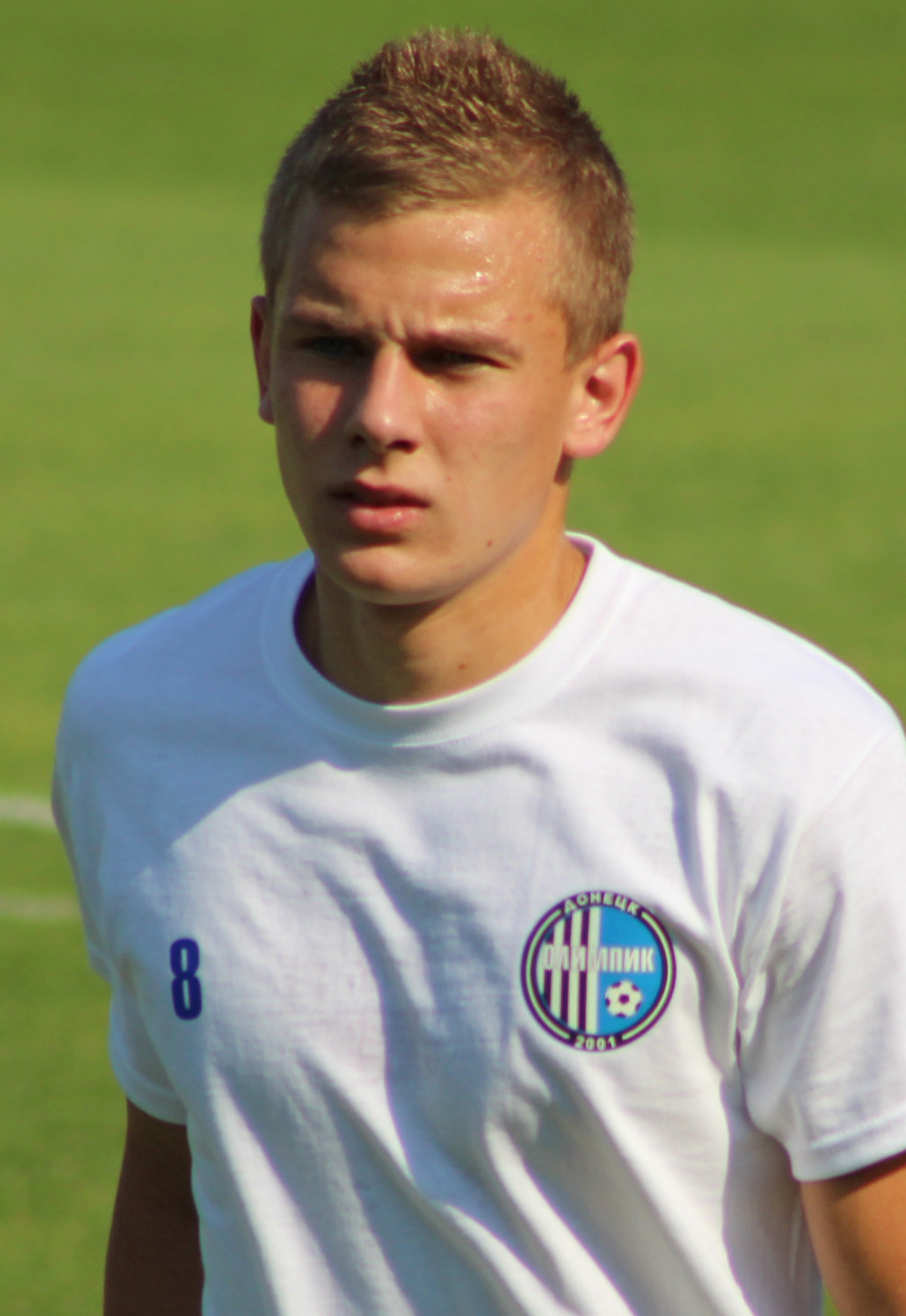

Personal information
- Full name: Volodymyr Vitaliyovych Doronin
- Date of birth: 15 January 1993 (age 33)
- Place of birth: Donetsk, Ukraine
- Height: 1.76 m (5 ft 9 1/2 in)
- Position: Midfielder

Team information
- Current team: Druzhba Myrivka
- Number: 77

Youth career
- 2006–2009: Shakhtar Donetsk
- 2009–2010: Olimpik Donetsk

Senior career*
Years	Team	Apps	(Gls)
2012–2018	Olimpik Donetsk	53	(0)
2012–2013	→ Shakhtar-3 Donetsk (loan)	22	(0)
2013–2014	→ Shakhtar Donetsk (loan)	0	(0)
2018–2019	Arsenal Kyiv	5	(0)
2020–2021	LNZ Cherkasy		
2022–	Druzhba Myrivka		
- * Club domestic league appearances and goals as of 8 July 2020

Volodymyr Doronin (Ukrainian: Володимир Віталійович Доронін; born 15 January 1993) is a Ukrainian footballer currently playing as a midfielder for Druzhba Myrivka.

He is a product of the FC Shakhtar Donetsk sportive school system, but then played for the Ukrainian First League club FC Olimpik Donetsk.
