= Anton Postupalenko =

Ukrainian footballer

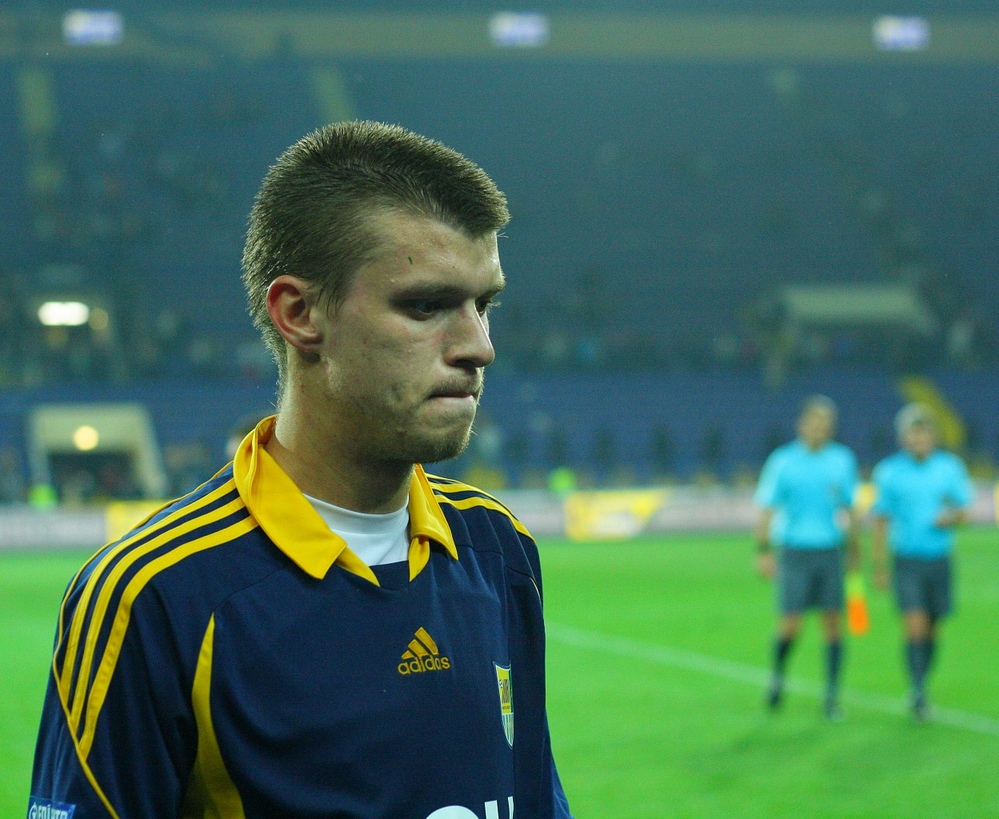

Personal information
- Full name: Anton Andriyovych Postupalenko
- Date of birth: 28 August 1988 (age 38)
- Place of birth: Kharkiv, Ukrainian SSR
- Height: 1.78 m (5 ft 10 in)
- Position: Midfielder

Youth career
- 2001–2005: UFK Kharkiv
- 2005: Metalist Kharkiv

Senior career*
Years	Team	Apps	(Gls)
2005–2012	Metalist Kharkiv	8	(0)
2005	→ Metalist-2 Kharkiv	3	(0)
2009	→ Zakarpattia Uzhhorod (loan)	1	(0)
2011–2012	→ Stal Alchevsk (loan)	38	(2)
2012–2014	Stal Alchevsk	44	(4)
2014–2015	Metalurh Donetsk	9	(2)
2015	Stal Dniprodzerzhynsk	1	(0)
2015–2017	Olimpik Donetsk	48	(8)
2018	Torpedo-BelAZ Zhodino	12	(1)
2019–2020	LNZ-Lebedyn (amateurs)	17	(2)
2020–2022	Metalist Kharkiv	33	(1)
Total		214	(20)

International career^{‡}
2006	Ukraine U18	4	(0)
2006	Ukraine U19	2	(0)
2008–2009	Ukraine U21	4	(0)
- * Club domestic league appearances and goals as of 8 December 2021 ‡ National team caps and goals as of 17 January 2018

Anton Postupalenko (Ukrainian: Антон Андрійович Поступаленко; born 28 August 1988) is a retired professional Ukrainian football midfielder.

== Career ==
Postupalenko began his football journey at the Metalist Youth School, joining the club's under-13 team. He was promoted to the senior team by head coach Myron Markevych for the 2006–07 season. However, Anton continued to play most of his matches for the Metalist Reserves.

=== National team ===
Postupalenko was an active member of the Ukraine national under-21 football team.
