= Artem Kozlov (footballer, born 1997) =

Ukrainian footballer

Personal information
- Full name: Artem Eduardovych Kozlov
- Date of birth: 10 February 1997 (age 29)
- Place of birth: Donetsk, Ukraine
- Height: 1.81 m (5 ft 11 in)
- Position: Left-back

Team information
- Current team: Lisne
- Number: 33

Youth career
- 2010–2014: Shakhtar Donetsk

Senior career*
Years	Team	Apps	(Gls)
2014–2018	Olimpik Donetsk	3	(0)
2017	→ Helios Kharkiv (loan)	16	(1)
2018	→ Sumy (loan)	15	(0)
2021	Kramatorsk	22	(0)
2022	Chaika	0	(0)
2022–2024	Druzhba Myrivka	21	(0)
2024–2025	Metalurh Zaporizhzhia	22	(0)
2025–2026	Lisne	10	(0)
2026	Bucha	0	(0)
2026	Druzhba-Kozaky	0	(0)
2026–	Dengoff Denykhivka	0	(0)
- * Club domestic league appearances and goals as of 5 September 2026

Artem Eduardovych Kozlov (Ukrainian: Артем Едуардович Козлов; born 10 February 1997) is a Ukrainian professional footballer who plays as a left-back for Ukrainian club Lisne.

== Career ==
Kozlov is a product of Shakhtar Donetsk Youth School System in his native Donetsk.

He signed contract with Olimpik Donetsk in summer 2014 and played in the Ukrainian Premier League Reserves. In July 2017 he went on loan and made his debut for Helios Kharkiv in the Ukrainian First League in a match against Balkany Zorya on 15 July 2017.

On 21 November 2018, it was announced that he is banned from competitions for participating in fixed games.

== Honours ==
Druzhba Myrivka

- Ukrainian Second League: 2023–24
- Ukrainian Amateur Cup: 2022–23
