= 2017–18 FC Chornomorets Odesa season =

FC Chornomorets Odesa
2017-18 season
- General Director: Anatoly Mysyura
- Manager: Oleksandr Babych (until 22 August 2017); Oleg Dulub (since 4 September 2017 until 22 December 2017); Kostyantyn Frolov (since 23 December 2017)
- Stadium: Chornomorets Stadium
- Ukrainian Premier League: 11th
- Ukrainian Cup: Round of 16 (1/8)
- Top goalscorer: League: Oleksiy Khoblenko (8); All: Oleksiy Khoblenko (8)
- Average home league attendance: 4,974
Home colours	Away colours

The 2017–18 season was the 80th season in the club's history and the 27th season of Odesa football club "Chornomorets" in the domestic league/cup of Ukraine. "The Sailors" competed in Premier League and Ukrainian Cup.

After finishing at 11th place in Premier League, Chornomorets lost to FC Poltava in play-offs and was relegated to First League. However on 21 June 2018 FC Poltava announce the dissolution of the club. On 3 June 2018 Chornomorets was officially approved by FFU as 2018–19 Ukrainian Premier League participant.

== Players ==
=== Squad information ===
As of 31 May 2018

Squad no.	Name	Nationality	Position	Date of birth (age)
Goalkeepers
54	Andriy Novak	(Ukraine)	GK	6 December 1988 (aged 29)
71	Dmytro Bezruk	(Ukraine)	GK	30 March 1996 (aged 22)
Defenders
2	Mamadou Wagué	(France) (Mali)	DF	19 August 1990 (aged 27)
5	Ivica Žunić	(Croatia)	DF	11 September 1988 (aged 29)
25	Yevhen Martynenko	(Ukraine)	DF	25 June 1993 (aged 24)
27	Serhiy Lyulka (Captain)	(Ukraine)	DF	22 February 1990 (aged 28)
32	Mykola Ischenko	(Ukraine)	DF	9 March 1983 (aged 35)
42	Yevhen Zubeyko	(Ukraine)	DF	30 September 1989 (aged 28)
51	Vladyslav Schetinin ^{List B}	(Ukraine)	DF	29 August 1997 (aged 20)
	Oleh Trakalo ^{List B}	(Ukraine)	DF	14 February 1998 (aged 20)
Midfielders
6	Kyrylo Kovalets	(Ukraine)	MF	2 July 1993 (aged 24)
7	Mykola Musolitin ^{List B}	(Ukraine)	MF	21 January 1999 (aged 19)
8	Guttiner Tenorio	(Brazil)	MF	6 October 1994 (aged 23)
11	Yevhen Smirnov	(Ukraine)	MF	16 April 1993 (aged 25)
13	Artem Chorniy	(Ukraine)	MF	23 November 1989 (aged 28)
14	Ivan Bobko	(Ukraine)	MF	10 December 1990 (aged 27)
15	Viktor Serdenyuk ^{List B}	(Ukraine)	MF	27 January 1996 (aged 22)
17	Mykyta Tatarkov	(Ukraine)	MF	4 January 1995 (aged 23)
19	Renat Mochulyak	(Ukraine)	MF	15 February 1998 (aged 20)
20	Oleksandr Mashnin	(Ukraine)	MF	20 March 1993 (aged 25)
21	Fousseni Bamba	(Guinea) (Ivory Coast)	MF	19 April 1990 (aged 28)
23	Vladyslav Khamelyuk ^{List B}	(Ukraine)	MF	4 May 1998 (aged 20)
48	Pavlo Orikhovskyi (on loan from Dynamo Kyiv) ^{List B}	(Ukraine)	MF	13 May 1996 (aged 22)
75	Maksym Tretyakov ^{List B}	(Ukraine)	MF	6 March 1996 (aged 22)
97	Yuriy Romanyuk	(Ukraine)	MF	6 May 1997 (aged 21)
Forwards
9	Dmytro Semeniv ^{List B}	(Ukraine)	FW	24 June 1998 (aged 19)
10	Sílvio	(Brazil)	FW	4 May 1994 (aged 24)
22	Ivan Matyazh	(Ukraine)	FW	15 February 1988 (aged 30)
24	Oleksandr Hladkyy	(Ukraine)	FW	24 August 1987 (aged 30)
26	Andriy Shtohrin ^{List B}	(Ukraine)	FW	14 December 1998 (aged 19)

== Transfers ==
=== In ===
Date	Pos.	Player	Age	Moving from	Type	Fee	Source
Summer
13 July 2017	DF	(Ukraine) Denys Balan	24	(Ukraine) Cherkaskyi Dnipro	Transfer	Free	
13 July 2017	DF	(Ukraine) Yevhen Zubeyko	27	(Ukraine) Karpaty Lviv	Transfer	Free	
13 July 2017	MF	(Ukraine) Renat Mochulyak	19	(Greece) Platanias	Transfer	Undisclosed	
13 July 2017	MF	(Ukraine) Ivan Bobko	26	Unattached	Transfer	Free	
13 July 2017	MF	(Belarus) Artsyom Rakhmanaw	27	(Moldova) Milsami Orhei	Transfer	Undisclosed	
13 July 2017	FW	(Ukraine) Vitaliy Kaverin	26	Unattached	Transfer	Free	
15 July 2017	MF	(Ukraine) Serhiy Politylo	28	Unattached	Transfer	Free	
15 July 2017	FW	(Ukraine) Oleksiy Antonov	31	Unattached	Transfer	Free	
17 July 2017	MF	(Ukraine) Viktor Serdenyuk	21	(Ukraine) Real Pharma Odesa	Transfer	Free	
28 July 2017	DF	(Ukraine) Artur Novotryasov	25	(Ukraine) FC Mariupol	Transfer	Free	
11 August 2017	FW	(Ukraine) Denys Vasin	28	(Ukraine) Stal Kamianske	Transfer	Free	
18 August 2017	DF	(Croatia) Ivica Žunić	28	(Russia) FC Orenburg	Transfer	Free	
8 September 2017	GK	(Belarus) Alyaksandr Hutar	28	(Russia) FC Tosno	Transfer	Free	
8 September 2017	DF	(France) Mamadou Wagué	27	(Sweden) Syrianska	Transfer	Free	
8 September 2017	MF	(France) Alassane N'Diaye	27	(France) Belfort	Transfer	Free	
8 September 2017	MF	(Guinea) Fousseni Bamba	27	Unattached	Transfer	Free	
13 October 2017	GK	(Ukraine) Andriy Fedorenko	33	Unattached	Transfer	Free	
1 June 2017	DF	(Ukraine) Serhiy Petko	23	(Ukraine) Veres Rivne	Loan return		
1 June 2017	MF	(Ukraine) Denys Norenkov	20	(Ukraine) Helios Kharkiv	Loan return		
1 June 2017	FW	(Ukraine) Vadym Yavorskyi	22	(Ukraine) Hirnyk-Sport	Loan return		
22 September 2017	MF	(Ukraine) Pavlo Orikhovskyi	21	(Ukraine) Dynamo Kyiv	Loan		
Winter
5 February 2018	GK	(Ukraine) Andriy Novak	29	(Cyprus) Ermis Aradippou	Transfer	Free	
5 February 2018	MF	(Ukraine) Ivan Bobko	27	Unattached	Transfer	Free	
5 February 2018	MF	(Ukraine) Artem Chorniy	28	(Ukraine) FC Oleksandriya	Transfer	Free	
5 February 2018	MF	(Ukraine) Yuriy Romanyuk	20	(Ukraine) Volyn Lutsk	Transfer	Free	
6 February 2018	MF	(Brazil) Guttiner Tenorio	23	(Ukraine) Olimpik Donetsk	Transfer	Free	
8 February 2018	DF	(Ukraine) Mykola Ischenko	32	(Ukraine) Veres Rivne	Transfer	Free	
22 February 2018	DF	(Ukraine) Oleh Trakalo	20	(Ukraine) Volyn Lutsk	Transfer	Free	
2 March 2018	FW	(Ukraine) Ivan Matyazh	30	(Croatia) Istra 1961	Transfer	Free	
24 March 2018	FW	(Ukraine) Oleksandr Hladkyy	30	(Ukraine) Karpaty Lviv	Transfer	Free	
1 January 2018	FW	(Ukraine) Mykhaylo Plokhotnyuk	18	(Ukraine) Dynamo Kyiv	Loan return		
1 January 2018	FW	(Ukraine) Vadym Yavorskyi	23	(Ukraine) MFC Mykolaiv	Loan return		

=== Out ===
Date	Pos.	Player	Age	Moving to	Type	Fee	Source
Summer
1 June 2017	DF	(Georgia (country)) Davit Khocholava	23	(Ukraine) Shakhtar Donetsk	Transfer	Undisclosed	
1 June 2017	FW	(Ukraine) Vladyslav Kabayev	21	(Ukraine) Zorya Luhansk	Transfer	Undisclosed	
1 June 2017	MF	(Ukraine) Artur Karnoza	26	Unattached	Transfer	Free	
21 June 2017	DF	(Ukraine) Rizvan Ablitarov	28	(Kazakhstan) FC Atyrau	Transfer	Undisclosed	
23 June 2017	FW	(Ukraine) Dmytro Korkishko	27	(Turkey) Giresunspor	Transfer	Free	
31 July 2017	DF	(Ukraine) Oleksandr Azatskyi	23	(Czech Republic) Baník Ostrava	Transfer	Undisclosed	
24 August 2017	DF	(Ukraine) Oleksandr Kalitov	23	(Ukraine) Real Pharma Odesa	Transfer	Undisclosed	
30 August 2017	GK	(Ukraine) Danylo Kanevtsev	21	(Ukraine) Metalist 1925 Kharkiv	Transfer	Free	
September 2017	DF	(Georgia (country)) Giorgi Gadrani	22	(Georgia (country)) Dinamo Tbilisi	Transfer	Free	
5 September 2017	MF	(Belarus) Artsyom Rakhmanaw	27	Unattached	Transfer	Free	
5 September 2017	MF	(Ukraine) Ivan Bobko	26	Unattached	Transfer	Free	
7 September 2017	DF	(Ukraine) Denys Balan	24	(Ukraine) Inhulets Petrove	Transfer	Free	
5 September 2017	DF	(Ukraine) Serhiy Petko	23	(Ukraine) Zhemchuzhyna Odesa	Transfer	Free	
5 September 2017	MF	(Ukraine) Denys Norenkov	21	(Ukraine) Zhemchuzhyna Odesa	Transfer	Free	
5 September 2017	FW	(Ukraine) Yevhen Murashov	22	(Ukraine) Zhemchuzhyna Odesa	Transfer	Free	
10 September 2017	DF	(Ukraine) Artur Novotryasov	25	(Ukraine) Inhulets Petrove	Transfer	Free	
4 October 2017	FW	(Ukraine) Petro Pereverza	23	(Ukraine) Balkany Zorya	Transfer	Free	
1 June 2017	MF	(Ukraine) Oleksandr Andriyevskyi	22	(Ukraine) Dynamo Kyiv	Loan return		
1 June 2017	MF	(Ukraine) Oleh Danchenko	22	(Ukraine) Shakhtar Donetsk	Loan return		
15 August 2017	FW	(Brazil) Jorge Elias	26	(Austria) Kapfenberger SV	Loan return		
4 July 2017	GK	(Ukraine) Bohdan Lobodrov	21	(Ukraine) Balkany Zorya	Loan		
11 July 2017	FW	(Ukraine) Mykhaylo Plokhotnyuk	18	(Ukraine) Dynamo Kyiv	Loan		
21 July 2017	FW	(Ukraine) Vadym Yavorskyi	23	(Ukraine) MFC Mykolaiv	Loan		
Winter
1 January 2018	MF	(Ukraine) Vitaliy Kaverin	27	Unattached	Transfer	Free	
1 January 2018	FW	(Ukraine) Volodymyr Barilko	23	Retired	Transfer	Free	
11 January 2018	FW	(Ukraine) Denys Vasin	28	(Ukraine) Vorskla Poltava	Transfer	Free	
22 January 2018	MF	(Ukraine) Serhiy Politylo	29	(Turkey) Adana Demirspor	Transfer	Free	
4 February 2018	MF	(France) Alassane N'Diaye	27	(Lithuania) Sūduva Marijampolė	Transfer	Free	
6 February 2018	FW	(Ukraine) Vadym Yavorskyi	23	(Ukraine) PFC Sumy	Transfer	Free	
23 February 2018	GK	(Belarus) Alyaksandr Hutar	28	(Belarus) Dynamo Brest	Transfer	Free	
16 February 2018	FW	(Ukraine) Oleksiy Antonov	31	(Latvia) Ventspils	Transfer	Free	
28 February 2018	GK	(Uzbekistan) Sergey Smorodin	23	(Maldives) Club Green Streets	Transfer	Free	
2 March 2018	DF	(Ukraine) Oleksandr Kapliyenko	21	(Belarus) FC Smolevichi	Transfer	Free	
31 March 2018	GK	(Ukraine) Andriy Fedorenko	34	(Sweden) Umeå FC	Transfer	Free	
12 January 2018	FW	(Ukraine) Oleksiy Khoblenko	23	(Poland) Lech Poznań	Loan		
23 February 2018	DF	(Ukraine) Vladyslav Schetinin	20	(Ukraine) Zhemchuzhyna Odesa	Loan		
23 February 2018	MF	(Ukraine) Oleksiy Chenyshev	20	(Ukraine) Zhemchuzhyna Odesa	Loan		
23 February 2018	MF	(Ukraine) Viktor Serdenyuk	22	(Ukraine) Zhemchuzhyna Odesa	Loan		

== Pre-season and friendlies ==
21 June 2017 Friendly	Sheriff Tiraspol (Moldova)	2–0	(Ukraine) Chornomorets Odesa	Tiraspol, Moldova
19:00 EEST (UTC+03:00)	Brezovec 13' (pen.); Damașcan 40'	Report		Stadium: Sheriff Stadium; Referee: Aleksandr Tian

25 June 2017 Friendly	Chornomorets Odesa (Ukraine)	5–1	(Ukraine) Zhemchuzhyna Odesa	Odesa
18:00 EEST (UTC+03:00)	Yavorskyi 9'; Khoblenko 54', 84', 89'; Tatarkov 66'	Report	Dolinskyi 82'	Stadium: Chornomorets Train Base; Attendance: 500; Referee: Yevhen Petrenko

28 June 2017 Friendly	Balkany Zorya (Ukraine)	1–1	(Ukraine) Chornomorets Odesa	Zorya
18:00 EEST (UTC+03:00)	65'	Report	80'	Stadium: Boris Tropaneț Stadium; Attendance: 1,500; Referee: Yevhen Petrenko

2 July 2017 Friendly	Chornomorets Odesa (Ukraine)	2–0	(Ukraine) Real Pharma Odesa	Odesa
17:30 EEST (UTC+03:00)	Khoblenko 18' (pen.); Kovalets 33'	Report		Stadium: Chornomorets Train Base; Attendance: 100; Referee: Dmytro Bondarenko

2 July 2017 Friendly	Chornomorets Odesa (Ukraine)	3–0	(Ukraine) Real Pharma Odesa	Odesa
18:45 EEST (UTC+03:00)	Azatskyi 5'; Barilko 18'; Popov 62' (pen.)	Report		Stadium: Chornomorets Train Base; Attendance: 200; Referee: Henadiy Serputko

5 July 2016 Friendly	Chornomorets Odesa (Ukraine)	5–0	(Ukraine) PFC Sumy	Odesa
17:30 EEST (UTC+03:00)	Khoblenko 32' (pen.), 45'; Yavorskyi 68', 90'; 87' (pen.)	Report		Stadium: Chornomorets Train Base; Attendance: 100; Referee: Oleksandr Pavlinov

8 July 2016 Friendly	Chornomorets Odesa (Ukraine)	1–3	(Ukraine) MFC Mykolaiv	Odesa
19:15 EEST (UTC+03:00)	60'	Report	Sikorskyi 5' (pen.); Norenkov 19' (o.g.); Tsebro 25'	Stadium: Chornomorets Train Base; Attendance: 200; Referee: Vitaliy Hodulian

9 July 2016 Friendly	Chornomorets Odesa (Ukraine)	1–3	(Ukraine) FC Mariupol	Odesa
17:00 EEST (UTC+03:00)	Kovalets 35'	Report	Kisil 52'; Mishchenko 77'; Horbunov 83'	Stadium: Chornomorets Train Base; Attendance: Hennadiy Serputko; Referee: 250

23 July 2016 Friendly	Chornomorets Odesa (Ukraine)	5–0	(Ukraine) FC Troitske	Odesa
EEST (UTC+03:00)	Sílvio 5'; Antonov 31' (pen.), 35', 79'; Tatarkov 42' (pen.)	Report		Stadium: Chornomorets Train Base

7 August 2017 Friendly	Chornomorets Odesa (Ukraine)	2–1	(Ukraine) Real Pharma Odesa	Odesa
10:30 EEST (UTC+03:00)	Kaverin 28'; Sílvio 43' (pen.)	Report	Sula 40' (pen.)	Stadium: Chornomorets Train Base; Referee: Vitaliy Hodulian

2 September 2017 Friendly	Chornomorets Odesa (Ukraine)	4–1	(Moldova) Zimbru Chișinău	Odesa
16:20 EEST (UTC+03:00)	Vasin 1'; Khoblenko 26'; Politylo 41'; Tatarkov 90'	Report	Douglas 40'	Stadium: Chornomorets Train Base; Attendance: 300; Referee: Yuriy Osipenko

7 October 2017 Friendly	Chornomorets Odesa (Ukraine)	1–1	(Moldova) Dinamo-Auto Tiraspol	Odesa
16:00 EEST (UTC+03:00)	Kovalets 60'	Report	Bugneac 37'	Stadium: Chornomorets Train Base; Referee: Dmytro Bondarenko

11 November 2017 Friendly	Chornomorets Odesa (Ukraine)	2–1	(Moldova) Spicul Chișcăreni	Odesa
14:00 EET (UTC+02:00)	Kovalets 3', 70'	Report	Mandrîcenco 45'	Stadium: Chornomorets Train Base; Attendance: 50; Referee: Yevhen Petrenko

19 January 2018 Friendly	Chornomorets Odesa (Ukraine)	0–1	(Kazakhstan) Irtysh Pavlodar	Belek, Turkey
16:30 EET (UTC+02:00)		Report	Kalinin 45'	Stadium: Kaya Hotel

21 January 2018 Friendly	Chornomorets Odesa (Ukraine)	0–3	(Romania) CSM Politehnica Iași	Belek, Turkey
16:30 EET (UTC+02:00)		Report	Cioinac 51'; 72'; Jô Santos 84'	Stadium: Kaya Hotel

23 January 2018 Friendly	Sabail Baku (Azerbaijan)	0–0	(Ukraine) Chornomorets Odesa	Antalya, Turkey
16:00 EET (UTC+02:00)		Report

25 January 2018 Friendly	Viitorul Constanța (Romania)	1–2	(Ukraine) Chornomorets Odesa	Belek, Turkey
10:00 EET (UTC+02:00)	Ciobanu 61'; Pitu 78' (pen.)	Report	65'	Stadium: Sueno hotel

27 January 2018 Friendly	Chornomorets Odesa (Ukraine)	1–0	(North Macedonia) Vardar Skopje	Belek, Turkey
10:00 EET (UTC+02:00)	Antonov 54'	Report		Stadium: Kaya Hotel

27 January 2018 Friendly	Chornomorets Odesa (Ukraine)	1–3	(Bulgaria) Dunav Ruse	Belek, Turkey
16:30 EET (UTC+02:00)	Guttiner 77'	Report	Nenov 36'; Georgiev 56', 79'	Stadium: Kaya Hotel

2 February 2018 Friendly	Chornomorets Odesa (Ukraine)	1–1	(North Macedonia) Shkupi Skopje	Side, Turkey
10:30 EET (UTC+02:00)	Musolitin 26'	Report	80'	Stadium: Starlight

2 February 2018 Friendly	Chornomorets Odesa (Ukraine)	3–1	(Kazakhstan) FC Atyrau	Side, Turkey
16:00 EET (UTC+02:00)	Sílvio 11'; 40'; Semeniv 52'	Report	Babatunde 29'	Stadium: Starlight

5 February 2018 Friendly	Dynamo Brest (Belarus)	0–1	(Ukraine) Chornomorets Odesa	Belek, Turkey
16:00 EET (UTC+02:00)		Report	Tatarkov 49'	Stadium: Titanic

6 February 2018 Friendly	Chornomorets Odesa (Ukraine)	2–3	(Czech Republic) Vysočina Jihlava	Side, Turkey
16:00 EET (UTC+02:00)	Sokolov 75'; Guttiner 87'	Report	Dvořák 8'; Zoubele 19'; Ikaunieks 34'	Stadium: Starlight

8 February 2018 Friendly	Chornomorets Odesa (Ukraine)	0–1	(Bulgaria) Pirin Blagoevgrad	Side, Turkey
10:00 EET (UTC+02:00)		Report	Henderson 32'	Stadium: Starlight

8 February 2018 Friendly	Chornomorets Odesa (Ukraine)	0–1	(Hungary) Mezőkövesd	Side, Turkey
16:00 EET (UTC+02:00)		Report	34'	Stadium: Starlight

25 March 2018 Friendly	Chornomorets Odesa (Ukraine)	1–1	(Moldova) Dinamo-Auto Tiraspol	Odesa
14:45 EEST (UTC+03:00)	Kovalets 60'	Report	Jalbă 43'	Stadium: Chornomorets Train Base; Referee: Oleksandr Derdo

== Competitions ==
=== Overall ===
Competition	First match	Last match	Starting round	Final position	Record							
Competition	First match	Last match	Starting round	Final position	Pld	W	D	L	GF	GA	GD	Win %
Premier League	18 July 2017	27 May 2018	Matchday 1	Relegation play-off (11th)	34	7	11	16	27	52	−25	20.59
Cup	25 October 2017	25 October 2017	Round 3 (1/16)	Round of 16 (1/8)	1	0	1	0	0	0	+0	0.00
Total					35	7	12	16	27	52	−25	20.00

Last updated: 27 May 2018
Source: Competitions

=== Premier League ===
==== League table ====
Pos	Team	Pld	W	D	L	GF	GA	GD	Pts	Qualification or relegation
8	Karpaty Lviv	32	8	13	11	28	45	−17	37	
9	Olimpik Donetsk	32	9	9	14	29	38	−9	36	
10	Zirka Kropyvnytskyi (R)	32	7	10	15	22	40	−18	31	Qualification for the Relegation play-offs
11	Chornomorets Odesa (Z)	32	6	11	15	26	49	−23	29	Qualification for the Relegation play-offs
12	Stal Kamianske (R, X)	32	6	8	18	23	44	−21	26	Relegated and later withdrawn

Source: Ukrainian Premier League (in Ukrainian), UEFA, Soccerway
Rules for classification: 1) Points; 2) Goal difference; 3) Goals scored; 4) Head-to-head points; 5) Head-to-head goal difference; 6) Head-to-head goals scored; 7) Draw.
(R) Relegated; (X) Withdrew; (Z) Readmitted in after withdrawal of FC Poltava. see 2017–18 Ukrainian Premier League #Relegation play-offs for more information.

Team 1	Agg.	Team 2	1st leg	2nd leg
Zirka Kropyvnytskyi	1–5	Desna Chernihiv	1–1	0–4
Chornomorets Odesa	1–3	FC Poltava	1–0	0–3 (a.e.t.)

==== Results summary ====
Overall								Home						Away					
Pld	W	D	L	GF	GA	GD	Pts	W	D	L	GF	GA	GD	W	D	L	GF	GA	GD
32	6	11	15	26	49	−23	29	4	7	5	16	18	−2	2	4	10	10	31	−21

Last updated: 19 May 2018.
Source: Competitive matches

==== Results by round ====
Round	1	2	3	4	5	6	7	8	9	10	11	12	13	14	15	16	17	18	19	20	21	22	23	24	25	26	27	28	29	30	31	32
Ground	A	H	A	H	A	H	A	A	H	A	H	H	A	H	A	H	A	H	H	A	H	A	A	H	A	H	A	H	A	H	A	H
Result	L	L	L	D	L	L	L	W	D	D	L	W	D	D	D	W	L	D	D	L	D	L	D	L	L	W	L	L	W	D	L	W
Position	9	12	12	12	12	12	12	12	12	12	12	10	11	11	11	9	9	10	10	11	11	11	10	12	12	12	12	12	11	12	12	11

Updated to match(es) played on 19 May 2018. Source: Competitive matches
A = Away; H = Home; W = Win; D = Draw; L = Loss

==== Matches ====
18 July 2017 1	Dynamo Kyiv	2–1	Chornomorets Odesa	Kyiv
19:00 EEST (UTC+03:00)	Shepelyev 22'; Yarmolenko 42'; Vida (yellow card) 60'	Report	Khoblenko 13'; Kapliyenko (yellow card) 60' (yellow-red card) 73'; Kovalets (yellow card) 83'	Stadium: Dynamo Stadium; Referee: Yuriy Hrysyo

22 July 2017 2	Chornomorets Odesa	0–1	Stal Kamianske	Odesa
17:00 EEST (UTC+03:00)	Musolitin (yellow card) 16'; Politylo (yellow card) 20'; Kovalets (yellow card) 58'; Antonov (yellow card) 87'	Report	Danielyan (yellow card) 66'; Penkov (yellow card) 68'; Kuzyk 74'; Gor Malakyan (yellow card) 81'; Yakymiv (yellow card) 85'	Stadium: Chornomorets Stadium; Attendance: 4,765; Referee: Serhiy Berezka

30 July 2017 3	FC Mariupol	3–0	Chornomorets Odesa	Mariupol
17:00 EEST (UTC+03:00)	Vakulenko 33' (pen.), 55'; Fomin 53', (yellow card) 59'	Report	Rakhmanaw (yellow card) 52'	Stadium: Volodymyr Boiko Stadium; Attendance: 8,750; Referee: Dmytro Kutakov

6 August 2017 4	Chornomorets Odesa	2–2	FC Oleksandriya	Odesa
19:30 EEST (UTC+03:00)	Tretyakov 26', (yellow card) 62' (yellow-red card) 70'; Khoblenko 48'; Kaverin (yellow card) 67'; Rakhmanaw (yellow card) 74'; Bobko (yellow card) 90+1'	Report	Kozak (yellow card) 19'; Pashayev (yellow card) 26'; Basov (yellow card) 31'; Chorniy (yellow card) 33' (yellow-red card) 45'; Hitchenko (yellow card) 45'; Tsurikov (yellow card) 57'; Bondarenko (yellow card) 75'; Hrytsuk 80' (pen.); Sitalo 87'	Stadium: Chornomorets Stadium; Attendance: 5,154; Referee: Vitaliy Romanov

13 August 2017 5	Olimpik Donetsk	1–0	Chornomorets Odesa	Kyiv
19:30 EEST (UTC+03:00)	Moha 47'; Shestakov (yellow card) 47'; Tsymbalyuk (yellow card) 90+1'	Report	Vasin (yellow card) 17'; Balan (yellow card) 30'; Rakhmanaw (yellow card) 45+1'; Novotryasov (yellow card) 72'	Stadium: Dynamo Stadium; Attendance: 800; Referee: Yuriy Mozharovsky

19 August 2017 6	Chornomorets Odesa	0–1	Veres Rivne	Odesa
19:30 EEST (UTC+03:00)	Antonov (yellow card) 28'; Vasin (yellow card) 87'	Report	Fedorchuk (yellow card) 71'; Kobin (yellow card) 74'; Karasyuk (yellow card) 86'; Adamyuk 90+2'	Stadium: Chornomorets Stadium; Attendance: 4,952; Referee: Viktor Kopiyevskyi

27 August 2017 7	Zorya Luhansk	5–0	Chornomorets Odesa	Zaporizhia
19:30 EEST (UTC+03:00)	Iury 2', 9'; Hrechyshkin 26' (pen.); Hordiyenko 40'; Karavayev 81'; Kharatin (yellow card) 83'	Report	Musolitin (yellow card) 15'; Vasin (yellow card) 22'; Žunić (yellow card) 25'; Kapliyenko (yellow card) 50'; Serdenyuk (yellow card) 88'	Stadium: Slavutych-Arena; Attendance: 2,608; Referee: Yaroslav Kozyk

10 September 2017 8	Zirka Kropyvnytskyi	0–1	Chornomorets Odesa	Kropyvnytskyi
14:00 EEST (UTC+03:00)	Drachenko (yellow card) 23'; Cécé Pepe (yellow card) 54'; Tsyupa (yellow card) 69'	Report	Vasin 36'; Bamba (yellow card) 44'; Khoblenko (yellow card) 60'; Žunić (yellow card) 63'; Zubeyko (yellow card) 87'	Stadium: Zirka Stadium; Attendance: 2,454; Referee: Dmytro Kutakov

17 September 2017 9	Chornomorets Odesa	0–0	Shakhtar Donetsk	Odesa
19:30 EEST (UTC+03:00)	Wagué (yellow card) 72'; Politylo (yellow card) 76'; Bamba (yellow card) 81'; Musolitin (yellow card) 90'; Hutar (yellow card) 90+3'	Report	Fred (yellow card) 90'	Stadium: Chornomorets Stadium; Attendance: 10,642; Referee: Yuriy Mozharovsky

24 September 2017 10	Karpaty Lviv	1–1	Chornomorets Odesa	Lviv
19:30 EEST (UTC+03:00)	Hladkyy 6' (pen.); Myakushko (yellow card) 62'; Nesterov (yellow card) 66'; Memeshev (yellow card) 79'; Ksyonz (yellow card) 88'	Report	Vasin (yellow card) 17'; Khoblenko 30'; N'Diaye (yellow card) 50'; Lyulka (yellow card) 54'; Wagué (yellow card) 58'; Zubeyko (yellow card) 74'	Stadium: Ukraina Stadium; Attendance: 1,262; Referee: Ivan Bondar

1 October 2017 11	Chornomorets Odesa	0–3	Vorskla Poltava	Odesa
14:00 EEST (UTC+03:00)		Report	Kulach 36'; Perduta (yellow card) 55'; Kadymyan 77'; Sklyar (yellow card) 77'; Kolomoyets 80'; Tkachenko (yellow card) 83'	Stadium: Chornomorets Stadium; Attendance: 4,562; Referee: Kostyantyn Trukhanov

15 October 2017 12	Chornomorets Odesa	2–1	Dynamo Kyiv	Odesa
19:30 EEST (UTC+03:00)	Kovalets 14'; Khoblenko 21'; Vasin (yellow card) 60'; Hutar (yellow card) 90+2'	Report	Kravets 78'; Mbokani (yellow card) 82'	Stadium: Chornomorets Stadium; Attendance: 9,683; Referee: Anatoliy Abdula

22 October 2017 13	Stal Kamianske	1–1	Chornomorets Odesa	Kyiv
14:00 EEST (UTC+03:00)	Edgar Malakyan (yellow card) 29', (goal) 62'; Mysyk (yellow card) 69'; Hrachov (yellow card) 77'	Report	Bamba (yellow card) 28'; Vasin (yellow card) 29', (goal) 52'; Hutar (yellow card) 31'; Orikhovskyi (yellow card) 38'; Lyulka (yellow card) 90'	Stadium: Obolon Arena; Attendance: 260; Referee: Ihor Paskhal

30 October 2017 14	Chornomorets Odesa	0–0	FC Mariupol	Odesa
19:00 EET (UTC+02:00)	Lyulka (yellow card) 37'; Žunić (yellow card) 60'	Report	Fomin (yellow card) 22'; Kozhanov (yellow card) 52'; Tyschenko (yellow card) 55'	Stadium: Chornomorets Stadium; Attendance: 2,756; Referee: Kateryna Monzul

4 November 2017 15	FC Oleksandriya	0–0	Chornomorets Odesa	Oleksandriya
17:00 EET (UTC+02:00)	Banada (yellow card) 33'; Chorniy (yellow card) 84'	Report	Politylo (yellow card) 11'; Tatarkov (yellow card) 15'; Lyulka (yellow card) 52'; N'Diaye (yellow card) 90+1'	Stadium: CSC Nika Stadium; Attendance: 1,608; Referee: Yuriy Hrysyo

19 November 2017 16	Chornomorets Odesa	2–1	Olimpik Donetsk	Odesa
19:30 EET (UTC+02:00)	N'Diaye (yellow card) 13'; Vasin (yellow card) 39'; Wagué (yellow card) 43', (goal) 81'; Kovalets (yellow card) 54', (goal) 58'; Orikhovskyi (yellow card) 75'; Politylo (yellow card) 85'	Report	Bohdanov (yellow card) 56'; Kravchenko (yellow card) 80'; Ochigava (yellow card) 85', (goal) 90+3'	Stadium: Chornomorets Stadium; Attendance: 3,642; Referee: Denys Shurman

26 November 2017 17	Veres Rivne	3–1	Chornomorets Odesa	Lviv
14:00 EET (UTC+02:00)	Karasyuk 25'; Voloshynovych 45'; Serhiychuk 54'	Report	Wagué (yellow card) 19'; Orikhovskyi (yellow card) 29'; Tatarkov (yellow card) 35'; Khoblenko 68'	Stadium: Arena Lviv; Attendance: 1,080; Referee: Kostyantyn Trukhanov

2 December 2017 18	Chornomorets Odesa	1–1	Zorya Luhansk	Odesa
14:00 EET (UTC+02:00)	Vasin (yellow card) 17' (yellow-red card) 18'; Khoblenko (yellow card) 18', (goal) 72'; N'Diaye (yellow card) 45' (yellow-red card) 77'; Žunić (yellow card) 53'; Politylo (yellow card) 90+4'	Report	Babenko (yellow card) 13' (yellow-red card) 33'; Kharatin (yellow card) 20'; Svatok 66'; Andriyevskyi (yellow card) 87'	Stadium: Chornomorets Stadium; Attendance: 4,242; Referee: Vitaliy Romanov

9 December 2017 19	Chornomorets Odesa	3–3	Zirka Kropyvnytskyi	Odesa
14:00 EET (UTC+02:00)	Bamba (yellow card) 10', (goal) 57'; Kovalets (yellow card) 25'; Khoblenko 43', 90' (pen.), (yellow card) 86' (yellow-red card) 90+3'; Wagué (yellow card) 45+3'; Martynenko (yellow card) 53'; Zubeyko (yellow card) 70'	Report	Dryshlyuk (yellow card) 27'; Favorov (yellow card) 45+3'; Chychykov 51'; Pryadun 83', 88'; Petrov (yellow card) 89'; Drachenko (yellow card) 90'	Stadium: Chornomorets Stadium; Attendance: 4,246; Referee: Ihor Paskhal

16 February 2018 20	Shakhtar Donetsk	5–0	Chornomorets Odesa	Kharkiv
19:30 EET (UTC+02:00)	Ferreyra 20', 41'; Khocholava (yellow card) 24'; Marlos 37', 52'; Kovalenko 90'	Report	Smirnov (yellow card) 46'; Tatarkov (yellow card) 84'	Stadium: OSC Metalist; Attendance: 2,189; Referee: Vitaliy Romanov

24 February 2018 21	Chornomorets Odesa	0–0	Karpaty Lviv	Odesa
14:00 EET (UTC+02:00)	Tatarkov (yellow card) 4'; Wagué (yellow card) 29'; Kovalets (red card) 29'; Novak (yellow card) 90+1'	Report	Di Franco (yellow card) 20'; Verbnyi (yellow card) 29'; Sandokhadze (yellow card) 36'; Carrascal (yellow card) 63'; Klyots (yellow card) 69'	Stadium: Chornomorets Stadium; Attendance: 4,124; Referee: Volodymyr Milanych

3 March 2018 22	Vorskla Poltava	2–1	Chornomorets Odesa	Poltava
17:00 EET (UTC+02:00)	Kolomoyets 17'; Zubeyko 45' (o.g.); Dallku (yellow card) 45+2'	Report	Bamba (yellow card) 60', (goal) 78'	Stadium: Vorskla Stadium; Attendance: 400; Referee: Viktor Kopiyevskyi

10 March 2018 23	FC Oleksandriya	0–0	Chornomorets Odesa	Oleksandriya
17:00 EET (UTC+02:00)	Banada (yellow card) 5'; Hitchenko (yellow card) 45+1'; Sitalo (red card) 74'	Report	Wagué (yellow card) 36'; Sílvio (yellow card) 41'; Tretyakov (yellow card) 90+4'	Stadium: CSC Nika Stadium; Attendance: 700; Referee: Serhiy Boyko

17 March 2018 24	Chornomorets Odesa	0–1	Stal Kamianske	Odesa
14:00 EET (UTC+02:00)	Smirnov (yellow card) 90'	Report	Kuzyk 18'; Thiago Rômulo (yellow card) 77'; Mysyk (yellow card) 90+4'	Stadium: Chornomorets Stadium; Attendance: 3,945; Referee: Mykola Kryvonosov

31 March 2018 25	Karpaty Lviv	3–1	Chornomorets Odesa	Lviv
14:00 EEST (UTC+03:00)	Carrascal 20'; Fedetskyi (yellow card) 45+2'; Shevchenko (yellow card) 45+2'; Shved 51', (yellow card) 69'; Catriel Sánchez 84'	Report	Tretyakov 45+2' (pen.); Smirnov (yellow card) 59'; Chorniy (yellow card) 65' (yellow-red card) 72'	Stadium: Ukraina Stadium; Attendance: 1,241; Referee: Kateryna Monzul

7 April 2018 26	Chornomorets Odesa	3–1	Olimpik Donetsk	Odesa
17:00 EEST (UTC+03:00)	Hladkyy (yellow card) 24', (goal) 33', 43'; Matyazh 82'; Bobko (yellow card) 84'	Report	Sondey 42'; Doronin (yellow card) 53'	Stadium: Chornomorets Stadium; Attendance: 3,532; Referee: Serhiy Boyko

15 April 2018 27	Zirka Kropyvnytskyi	2–1	Chornomorets Odesa	Kropyvnytskyi
17:00 EEST (UTC+03:00)	Zbun (yellow card) 2'; Bilonoh 63', 79'	Report	Tretyakov (yellow card) 25'; Romanyuk (yellow card) 47' (yellow-red card) 74'; Tatarkov (yellow card) 54'; Chorniy 90+2'	Stadium: Zirka Stadium; Attendance: 1,722; Referee: Dmytro Kutakov

21 April 2018 28	Chornomorets Odesa	1–3	FC Oleksandriya	Odesa
14:00 EEST (UTC+03:00)	Hladkyy (yellow card) 48'; Bobko 50'	Report	Starenkyi 7'; Hrytsuk 24' (pen.), (yellow card) 64'; Dovhyi (yellow card) 59'; Polyarus 77'; Zaporozhan (yellow card) 90+3'	Stadium: Chornomorets Stadium; Attendance: 5,321; Referee: Mykola Balakin

28 April 2018 29	Stal Kamianske	1–2	Chornomorets Odesa	Kyiv
17:00 EEST (UTC+03:00)	Meskhi (yellow card) 1'; Klymchuk 22'	Report	Tretyakov 25'; Kovalets (yellow card) 58'; Bobko 65'	Stadium: Obolon Arena; Attendance: 340; Referee: Serhiy Boyko

5 May 2018 30	Chornomorets Odesa	1–1	Karpaty Lviv	Odesa
17:00 EEST (UTC+03:00)	Smirnov (yellow card) 45+1', (goal) 76'; Orikhovskyi (yellow card) 65'; Hladkyy (yellow card) 70'; Bobko (yellow card) 85'	Report	Shved 14', (yellow card) 79'; Erbes (yellow card) 26'; Nesterov (yellow card) 70'; Fedetskyi (yellow card) 70'	Stadium: Chornomorets Stadium; Attendance: 3,658; Referee: Ivan Bondar

12 May 2018 31	Olimpik Donetsk	1–0	Chornomorets Odesa	Kyiv
17:00 EEST (UTC+03:00)	Kozlov (yellow card) 24'; Kulynych (yellow card) 76'; Lyulka 88' (o.g.)	Report	Chorniy (yellow card) 17'	Stadium: Dynamo Stadium; Attendance: 490; Referee: Mykola Kryvonosov

19 May 2018 32	Chornomorets Odesa	1–0	Zirka Kropyvnytskyi	Odesa
17:00 EEST (UTC+03:00)	Lyulka (yellow card) 35'; Romanyuk (yellow card) 51'; Tretyakov 57'	Report	Petrov (yellow card) 12'; Zbun (yellow card) 67'; Guedj (yellow card) 69'; Yampol (yellow card) 74'; Gafaiti (yellow card) 83'	Stadium: Chornomorets Stadium; Attendance: 4,355; Referee: Dmytro Kutakov

==== Relegation round ====
23 May 2018 1	Chornomorets Odesa	1–0	FC Poltava	Odesa
19:00 EEST (UTC+03:00)	Kovalets (yellow card) 3', (goal) 36'; Bobko (yellow card) 62'; Novak (yellow card) 90+2'	Report	Krapyvnyi (yellow card) 27'; Bashlay (yellow card) 35'; Holikov (yellow card) 60'; Nasibulin (yellow card) 67'; Dehtyarev (yellow card) 68'	Stadium: Chornomorets Stadium; Attendance: 4,124; Referee: Ievgenii Aranovskyi

27 May 2018 2	FC Poltava	3–0	Chornomorets Odesa	Poltava
17:00 EEST (UTC+03:00)	Dehtyarev 67', 105'; Savchenko (yellow card) 97'; Bashlay (yellow card) 101'; Zubeyko 113' (o.g.)	Report	Orikhovskyi (yellow card) 38'; Romanyuk (yellow card) 64' (yellow-red card) 110'; Smirnov (yellow card) 88'	Stadium: Lokomotyv Stadium; Attendance: 3,700; Referee: Yuriy Mozharovskyi

=== Ukrainian Cup ===
25 October 2017 Round of 16 (1/8)	SC Dnipro-1	0–0 (8 – 7 p)	Chornomorets Odesa	Dnipro
19:00 EEST (UTC+03:00)	Polyovyi (yellow card) 89'; Kravchenko (yellow card) 99'	Report	Zubeyko (yellow card) 89'; Lyulka (yellow card) 99'; Khoblenko (yellow card) 103'	Stadium: Dnipro-Arena; Attendance: 2,526; Referee: Oleksandr Shandor
	Penalties
	Kravchenko (penalty scored); Lyashenko (penalty scored); Supryaha (penalty scored); Lopyryonok (penalty scored); Voytsekhovskyi (penalty scored); Brovchenko (penalty scored); Polyovyi (penalty scored); Poplavka (penalty scored); Lohinov (penalty missed)		Vasin (penalty scored); Khoblenko (penalty scored); Politylo (penalty scored); Tatarkov (penalty scored); Žunić (penalty scored); Zubeyko (penalty scored); Musolitin (penalty scored); Martynenko (penalty missed); Lyulka (penalty missed)

== Statistics ==
=== Appearances and goals ===
No.	Pos	Nat	Player	Total		Premier League		Cup	
No.	Pos	Nat	Player	Apps	Goals	Apps	Goals	Apps	Goals
Goalkeepers
54	GK	(Ukraine) UKR	Andriy Novak	9	0	9	0	0	0
71	GK	(Ukraine) UKR	Dmytro Bezruk	14	0	12+2	0	0	0
Defenders
2	DF	(France) FRA	Mamadou Wagué	13	1	12+1	1	0	0
5	DF	(Croatia) CRO	Ivica Žunić	25	0	24	0	1	0
25	DF	(Ukraine) UKR	Yevhen Martynenko	13	0	11+1	0	1	0
27	DF	(Ukraine) UKR	Serhiy Lyulka	23	0	22	0	1	0
32	DF	(Ukraine) UKR	Mykola Ischenko	3	0	2+1	0	0	0
42	DF	(Ukraine) UKR	Yevhen Zubeyko	26	0	22+3	0	1	0
Midfielders
6	MF	(Ukraine) UKR	Kyrylo Kovalets	29	3	27+2	3	0	0
7	MF	(Ukraine) UKR	Mykola Musolitin	19	0	6+12	0	1	0
8	MF	(Brazil) BRA	Guttiner Tenorio	7	0	3+4	0	0	0
11	MF	(Ukraine) UKR	Yevhen Smirnov	13	1	11+2	1	0	0
13	MF	(Ukraine) UKR	Artem Chorniy	13	1	9+4	1	0	0
14	MF	(Ukraine) UKR	Ivan Bobko	18	2	15+3	2	0	0
15	MF	(Ukraine) UKR	Viktor Serdenyuk	2	0	0+2	0	0	0
17	MF	(Ukraine) UKR	Mykyta Tatarkov	27	0	23+3	0	0+1	0
20	MF	(Ukraine) UKR	Oleksandr Mashnin	7	0	4+3	0	0	0
21	MF	(Guinea) GUI	Fousseni Bamba	15	2	12+2	2	1	0
23	MF	(Ukraine) UKR	Vladyslav Khamelyuk	4	0	0+4	0	0	0
48	MF	(Ukraine) UKR	Pavlo Orikhovskyi	15	0	11+4	0	0	0
75	MF	(Ukraine) UKR	Maksym Tretyakov	31	4	21+9	4	1	0
97	MF	(Ukraine) UKR	Yuriy Romanyuk	8	0	8	0	0	0
Forwards
9	FW	(Ukraine) UKR	Dmytro Semeniv	6	0	1+5	0	0	0
10	FW	(Brazil) BRA	Sílvio	6	0	5+1	0	0	0
22	FW	(Ukraine) UKR	Ivan Matyazh	8	1	1+7	1	0	0
24	FW	(Ukraine) UKR	Oleksandr Hladkyy	9	2	9	2	0	0
26	FW	(Ukraine) UKR	Andriy Shtohrin	1	0	0+1	0	0	0
Players transferred out during the season
1	GK	(Belarus) BLR	Alyaksandr Hutar	12	0	12	0	0	0
2	DF	(Ukraine) UKR	Oleksandr Azatskyi	2	0	2	0	0	0
4	MF	(France) FRA	Alassane N'Diaye	11	0	10	0	1	0
9	FW	(Ukraine) UKR	Oleksiy Khoblenko	20	8	17+2	8	0+1	0
10	FW	(Ukraine) UKR	Vitaliy Kaverin	11	0	1+9	0	1	0
16	DF	(Ukraine) UKR	Artur Novotryasov	5	0	5	0	0	0
23	MF	(Ukraine) UKR	Denys Norenkov	2	0	1+1	0	0	0
30	GK	(Uzbekistan) UZB	Sergey Smorodin	1	0	1	0	0	0
31	GK	(Ukraine) UKR	Andriy Fedorenko	1	0	0	0	1	0
39	DF	(Ukraine) UKR	Denys Balan	3	0	3	0	0	0
69	FW	(Ukraine) UKR	Oleksiy Antonov	7	0	4+3	0	0	0
77	FW	(Ukraine) UKR	Denys Vasin	14	2	12+1	2	0+1	0
89	MF	(Ukraine) UKR	Serhiy Politylo	18	0	15+2	0	1	0
90	MF	(Belarus) BLR	Artsyom Rakhmanaw	7	0	7	0	0	0
96	DF	(Ukraine) UKR	Oleksandr Kapliyenko	5	0	4+1	0	0	0

Source: Competitions

Last updated: 27 May 2018

=== Goalscorers ===
Rank	No.	Pos	Nat	Name	Premier League	Cup	Total
1	9	FW	(Ukraine)	Oleksiy Khoblenko	8	0	8
2	75	MF	(Ukraine)	Maksym Tretyakov	4	0	4
3	6	MF	(Ukraine)	Kyrylo Kovalets	3	0	3
4	14	MF	(Ukraine)	Ivan Bobko	2	0	2
4	21	MF	(Guinea)	Fousseni Bamba	2	0	2
4	24	FW	(Ukraine)	Oleksandr Hladkyy	2	0	2
4	77	FW	(Ukraine)	Denys Vasin	2	0	2
8	2	DF	(France)	Mamadou Wagué	1	0	1
8	11	MF	(Ukraine)	Yevhen Smirnov	1	0	1
8	13	MF	(Ukraine)	Artem Chorniy	1	0	1
8	22	FW	(Ukraine)	Ivan Matyazh	1	0	1
				Total	27	0	27

Last updated: 27 May 2018

=== Clean sheets ===
Rank	No.	Pos	Nat	Name	Premier League	Cup	Total
1	1	GK	(Belarus)	Alyaksandr Hutar	4	0	4
1	54	GK	(Ukraine)	Andriy Novak	4	0	4
3	31	GK	(Ukraine)	Andriy Fedorenko	0	1	1
3	71	GK	(Ukraine)	Dmytro Bezruk	1	0	1
				Total	9	1	10

Last updated: 27 May 2018

=== Disciplinary record ===
No.	Pos	Nat	Player	Premier League			Cup			Total		
No.	Pos	Nat	Player	Booked	(yellow card) (yellow-red card)	Sent off (straight red)	Booked	(yellow card) (yellow-red card)	Sent off (straight red)	Booked	(yellow card) (yellow-red card)	Sent off (straight red)
1	GK	(Belarus)	Alyaksandr Hutar	3	0	0	0	0	0	3	0	0
2	DF	(France)	Mamadou Wagué	7	0	0	0	0	0	7	0	0
4	MF	(France)	Alassane N'Diaye	3	1	0	0	0	0	3	1	0
5	DF	(Croatia)	Ivica Žunić	4	0	0	0	0	0	4	0	0
6	MF	(Ukraine)	Kyrylo Kovalets	6	0	1	0	0	0	6	0	1
7	MF	(Ukraine)	Mykola Musolitin	3	0	0	0	0	0	3	0	0
9	FW	(Ukraine)	Oleksiy Khoblenko	2	1	0	1	0	0	3	1	0
10	FW	(Ukraine)	Vitaliy Kaverin	1	0	0	0	0	0	1	0	0
10	FW	(Brazil)	Sílvio	1	0	0	0	0	0	1	0	0
11	MF	(Ukraine)	Yevhen Smirnov	5	0	0	0	0	0	5	0	0
13	MF	(Ukraine)	Artem Chorniy	1	1	0	0	0	0	1	1	0
14	MF	(Ukraine)	Ivan Bobko	4	0	0	0	0	0	4	0	0
15	MF	(Ukraine)	Viktor Serdenyuk	1	0	0	0	0	0	1	0	0
17	MF	(Ukraine)	Mykyta Tatarkov	5	0	0	0	0	0	5	0	0
16	DF	(Ukraine)	Artur Novotryasov	1	0	0	0	0	0	1	0	0
21	MF	(Guinea)	Fousseni Bamba	5	0	0	0	0	0	5	0	0
24	FW	(Ukraine)	Oleksandr Hladkyy	3	0	0	0	0	0	3	0	0
25	DF	(Ukraine)	Yevhen Martynenko	1	0	0	0	0	0	1	0	0
27	DF	(Ukraine)	Serhiy Lyulka	5	0	0	1	0	0	6	0	0
39	DF	(Ukraine)	Denys Balan	1	0	0	0	0	0	1	0	0
42	DF	(Ukraine)	Yevhen Zubeyko	3	0	0	1	0	0	4	0	0
48	MF	(Ukraine)	Pavlo Orikhovskyi	5	0	0	0	0	0	5	0	0
54	GK	(Ukraine)	Andriy Novak	2	0	0	0	0	0	2	0	0
69	FW	(Ukraine)	Oleksiy Antonov	2	0	0	0	0	0	2	0	0
75	MF	(Ukraine)	Maksym Tretyakov	2	1	0	0	0	0	2	1	0
77	FW	(Ukraine)	Denys Vasin	7	1	0	0	0	0	7	1	0
89	MF	(Ukraine)	Serhiy Politylo	5	0	0	0	0	0	5	0	0
90	MF	(Belarus)	Artsyom Rakhmanaw	3	0	0	0	0	0	3	0	0
96	DF	(Ukraine)	Oleksandr Kapliyenko	1	1	0	0	0	0	1	1	0
97	MF	(Ukraine)	Yuriy Romanyuk	1	2	0	0	0	0	1	2	0
			Total	93	8	1	3	0	0	96	8	1

Last updated: 27 May 2018
