= List of Ukrainian football transfers winter 2017–18 =

This is a list of Ukrainian football transfers winter 2017-18. Only clubs in 2017–18 Ukrainian Premier League are included.

° denotes unconfirmed transfers.

== Ukrainian Premier League ==
=== Chornomorets Odesa ===
In:

No.	Pos.	Nation	Player
—	GK	UKR	Andriy Novak (from (Cyprus) Ermis Aradippou)
—	DF	UKR	Kyrylo Bilokamenskyi (loan return from (Ukraine) Zhemchuzhyna Odesa)
—	DF	UKR	Mykola Ischenko (from (Ukraine) Veres Rivne)
—	DF	UKR	Oleh Trakalo (from (Ukraine) Volyn Lutsk)
—	DF	UKR	Artem Yarmolenko (free agent)
—	MF	UKR	Ivan Bobko (free agent)
—	MF	UKR	Artem Chorniy (from (Ukraine) Oleksandriya)
—	MF	BRA	Guttiner Tenorio (from (Ukraine) Olimpik Donetsk)
—	MF	UKR	Yuriy Romanyuk (from (Ukraine) Volyn Lutsk)
—	FW	UKR	Oleksandr Hladkyy (from (Ukraine) Karpaty Lviv)
—	FW	UKR	Ivan Matyazh (from (Croatia) Istra 1961)
—	FW	UKR	Mykhaylo Plokhotnyuk (loan return from (Ukraine) Dynamo Kyiv)
—	FW	UKR	Vadym Yavorskyi (loan return from (Ukraine) MFC Mykolaiv)

Out:

No.	Pos.	Nation	Player
—	GK	UKR	Andriy Fedorenko (to (Sweden) Umeå FC)
—	GK	BLR	Alyaksandr Hutar (to (Belarus) Dynamo Brest)
—	GK	UZB	Sergey Smorodin (to (Maldives) Club Green Streets)
—	DF	UKR	Oleksandr Kapliyenko (to (Belarus) Smolevichi)
—	DF	UKR	Vladyslav Schetinin (on loan to (Ukraine) Zhemchuzhyna Odesa)
—	MF	UKR	Oleksiy Chernyshov (on loan to (Ukraine) Zhemchuzhyna Odesa)
—	MF	UKR	Vitaliy Kaverin
—	MF	FRA	Alassane N'Diaye (to (Lithuania) Sūduva Marijampolė)
—	MF	UKR	Serhiy Politylo (to (Turkey) Adana Demirspor)
—	MF	UKR	Mykhaylo Popov (on loan to (Ukraine) Zhemchuzhyna Odesa)
—	MF	UKR	Artem Seleznyov (on loan to (Ukraine) Zhemchuzhyna Odesa)
—	MF	UKR	Viktor Serdenyuk (on loan to (Ukraine) Zhemchuzhyna Odesa)
—	FW	UKR	Oleksiy Antonov (to (Latvia) Ventspils)
—	FW	UKR	Volodymyr Barilko (retired)
—	FW	UKR	Oleksiy Khoblenko (on loan to (Poland) Lech Poznań)
—	FW	UKR	Denys Vasin (to (Ukraine) Vorskla Poltava)
—	FW	UKR	Vadym Yavorskyi (to (Ukraine) PFC Sumy)

=== Dynamo Kyiv ===
In:

No.	Pos.	Nation	Player
—	GK	UKR	Denys Boyko (on loan from (Turkey) Beşiktaş)
—	DF	UKR	Pavlo Lukyanchuk (loan return from (Ukraine) Olimpik Donetsk)
—	DF	UKR	Bohdan Mykhaylychenko (loan return from (Ukraine) Stal Kamianske)
—	DF	UKR	Oleksandr Osman (loan return from (Ukraine) Karpaty Lviv)
—	DF	UKR	Artem Shabanov (from (Ukraine) Olimpik Donetsk)
—	DF	UKR	Oleksandr Tymchyk (loan return from (Ukraine) Stal Kamianske)
—	DF	PER	Carlos Zambrano (from (Russia) Rubin Kazan)
—	MF	UKR	Vladyslav Kalitvintsev (loan return from (Ukraine) Zorya Luhansk)
—	MF	UKR	Ruslan Rotan (from (Czech Republic) Slavia Prague)
—	MF	SVN	Benjamin Verbič (from (Denmark) FC Copenhagen)
—	FW	COL	Andrés Ramiro Escobar (loan return from (Brazil) Vasco da Gama)
—	FW	UKR	Dmytro Khlyobas (loan return from (Belarus) Dinamo Minsk)
—	FW	UKR	Oleksiy Schebetun (loan return from (Ukraine) Stal Kamianske)

Out:

No.	Pos.	Nation	Player
—	GK	UKR	Maksym Koval (on loan to (Spain) Deportivo La Coruña)
—	DF	GEO	Luka Lochoshvili (on loan to (Georgia (country)) Dinamo Tbilisi)
—	DF	UKR	Pavlo Lukyanchuk (on loan to (Ukraine) Veres Rivne)
—	DF	CRO	Domagoj Vida (to (Turkey) Beşiktaş)
—	DF	UKR	Oleksandr Osman (on loan to (Ukraine) Arsenal Kyiv)
—	DF	UKR	Oleksandr Tymchyk (on loan to (Ukraine) Zorya Luhansk)
—	MF	UKR	Artem Mylchenko ((on loan?) to (Ukraine) Zorya Luhansk)
—	FW	COL	Andrés Ramiro Escobar (to (Argentina) Estudiantes La Plata)
—	FW	UKR	Artem Kravets (to (Turkey) Kayserispor)
—	FW	UKR	Mykhaylo Plokhotnyuk (loan return to (Ukraine) Chornomorets Odesa)
—	FW	UKR	Oleksiy Schebetun (to (Belarus) Luch Minsk)

=== Karpaty Lviv ===
In:

No.	Pos.	Nation	Player
—	GK	UKR	Oleksiy Shevchenko (from (Ukraine) Zorya Luhansk)
—	DF	UKR	Andriy Markovych (loan return from (Ukraine) Rukh Vynnyky)
—	DF	GEO	Nika Sandokhadze (from (Georgia (country)) Samtredia)
—	MF	ARG	Cristian Erbes (from (Argentina) Chacarita Juniors)
—	MF	UKR	Yuriy Tkachuk (loan return from (Ukraine) Rukh Vynnyky)
—	MF	UKR	Artem Filimonov (loan rerurn from (Cyprus) Pafos FC)
—	MF	UKR	Nazar Verbnyi (loan return from (Ukraine) Rukh Vynnyky)
—	FW	COL	Yhonatan Bedoya (from (Spain) RCD Espanyol B)
—	FW	COL	Maurício Cortés (on loan from (Colombia) Independiente Medellín)
—	FW	ARG	Catriel Sánchez (on loan from (Argentina) Talleres)
—	FW	BOL	Rodrigo Vargas (from (Bolivia) The Strongest)

Out:

No.	Pos.	Nation	Player
—	GK	UKR	Oleh Mozil (on loan to (Ukraine) FC Lviv)
—	GK	UKR	Ivan Siletskyi (to (Ukraine) Stal Kamianske)
—	DF	ARG	Guido Corteggiano (to (Italy) Lecco)
—	DF	UKR	Andriy Markovych (on loan to (Estonia) Nõmme Kalju)
—	DF	UKR	Oleksandr Osman (loan return to (Ukraine) Dynamo Kyiv)
—	DF	ARG	Federico Hernán Pereyra (to (Chile) Huachipato)
—	MF	ESP	Mario Arqués (to (Spain) Alcoyano)
—	MF	UKR	Artem Filimonov (to (Belarus) FC Gomel)
—	MF	UKR	Ihor Khudobyak (to (Kazakhstan) Akzhayik)
—	MF	UKR	Pavlo Ksyonz (to (Poland) Sandecja Nowy Sącz)
—	MF	UKR	Redvan Memeshev (to (Ukraine) SC Dnipro-1)
—	MF	ARG	Fernando Tissone (to (Portugal) C.D. Aves)
—	MF	UKR	Yuriy Tkachuk (on loan to (Estonia) Levadia Tallinn)
—	MF	UKR	Taras Zaviyskyi (on loan to (Ukraine) FC Lviv)
—	FW	UKR	Roman Debelko (on loan to (Estonia) Levadia Tallinn)
—	FW	UKR	Oleksandr Hladkyy (to (Ukraine) Chornomorets Odesa)
—	FW	BRA	China

=== Mariupol ===
In:

No.	Pos.	Nation	Player
—	DF	CMR	Joyskim Dawa
—	DF	MKD	Besir Demiri (from (North Macedonia) Vardar)
—	MF	UKR	Denys Dedechko (from (Russia) SKA-Khabarovsk)
—	MF	UKR	Danylo Ihnatenko (on loan from (Ukraine) Shakhtar Donetsk)
—	MF	UKR	Oleksandr Pikhalyonok (on loan from (Ukraine) Shakhtar Donetsk)
—	FW	UKR	Denys Arendaruk (on loan from (Ukraine) Shakhtar Donetsk)
—	FW	UKR	Anatoliy Didenko (from (Ukraine) Zhemchuzhyna Odesa)

Out:

No.	Pos.	Nation	Player
—	DF	BRA	Eriks Santos
—	MF	UKR	Ruslan Kisil (to (Ukraine) Olimpik Donetsk)
—	MF	UKR	Vitaliy Koltsov (to (Ukraine) FC Oleksandriya)
—	MF	UKR	Denys Kozhanov (to (Ukraine) Veres Rivne)
—	MF	UKR	Serhiy Rudyka (to (Belarus) Dnepr Mogilev)
—	MF	UKR	Vyacheslav Tankovskyi (loan return to (Ukraine) Shakhtar Donetsk)
—	MF	UKR	Serhiy Vakulenko (loan return to (Ukraine) Shakhtar Donetsk)
—	MF	UKR	Vitaliy Vitsenets (retired)
—	FW	UKR	Ruslan Fomin (to (Ukraine) Shakhtar Donetsk)
—	FW	UKR	Artem Merkushov (to (Ukraine) Polissya Zhytomyr)

=== Oleksandriya ===
In:

No.	Pos.	Nation	Player
—	DF	UKR	Hlib Bukhal (on loan from (Ukraine) FC Lviv)
—	DF	UKR	Denys Sotnikov
—	DF	UKR	Anton Shendrik (free agent)
—	MF	UKR	Vitaliy Koltsov (from (Ukraine) FC Mariupol)
—	MF	UKR	Serhiy Rusyan (from (Ukraine) Olimpik Donetsk)
—	MF	UKR	Oleksiy Zinkevych (from (Ukraine) Shakhtar Donetsk)
—	FW	UKR	Dmytro Shastal (from (Ukraine) Enerhiya Nova Kakhovka)

Out:

No.	Pos.	Nation	Player
—	DF	UKR	Serhiy Basov (to (Kazakhstan) Akzhayik)
—	MF	UKR	Artem Chorniy (to (Ukraine) Chornomorets Odesa)
—	MF	UKR	Maksym Kalenchuk (to (Ukraine) Veres Rivne)
—	MF	UKR	Mykhaylo Kozak (to (Ukraine) Rukh Vynnyky)
—	MF	UKR	Artem Schedryi (to (Ukraine) Olimpik Donetsk)
—	FW	UKR	Yaroslav Dovhyi (to (Ukraine) Zirka Kropyvnytskyi)
—	FW	UKR	Stanislav Kulish (to (Ukraine) Veres Rivne)

=== Olimpik Donetsk ===
In:

No.	Pos.	Nation	Player
—	GK	UKR	Yaroslav Kotlyarov (loan return from (Ukraine) Helios Kharkiv)
—	DF	UKR	Vadym Schastlyvtsev (loan return from (Ukraine) Helios Kharkiv)
—	DF	UKR	Artem Kozlov (loan return from (Ukraine) Helios Kharkiv)
—	DF	UKR	Serhiy Kulynych (from (Belarus) FC Minsk)
—	DF	UKR	Andriy Mischenko (free agent)
—	DF	UKR	Dmytro Nyemchaninov (on loan from (Russia) Krylia Sovetov Samara)
—	DF	UKR	Temur Partsvania (from (Ukraine) Desna Chernihiv)
—	MF	UKR	Vladyslav Apostoliuk (from (Slovakia) Poprad)
—	MF	UKR	Vitaliy Balashov (from (Belarus) Isloch Minsk Raion)
—	MF	UKR	Ruslan Kisil (from (Ukraine) FC Mariupol)
—	MF	BRA	Leônidas (from (Ukraine) Zorya Luhansk)
—	MF	UKR	Hennadiy Pasich (from (Ukraine) Veres Rivne)
—	MF	UKR	Yevhen Pasich (from (Ukraine) Veres Rivne)
—	MF	UKR	Artem Schedryi (from (Ukraine) FC Oleksandriya)
—	MF	CRO	Josip Vuković (from (Bosnia and Herzegovina) Vitez)
—	MF	UKR	Serhiy Vakulenko (on loan from (Ukraine) Shakhtar Donetsk)
—	FW	UKR	Vladyslav Helzin
—	FW	UKR	Yuriy Zakharkiv (from (Ukraine) SC Dnipro-1)

Out:

No.	Pos.	Nation	Player
—	GK	UKR	Yaroslav Kotlyarov (on loan to (Ukraine) Sudnobudivnyk Mykolaiv)
—	DF	UKR	Vitaliy Fedoriv (to (Russia) Olimpiyets Nizhny Novgorod)
—	DF	UKR	Anton Kravchenko (to (Turkey) Kardemir Karabükspor)
—	DF	UKR	Pavlo Lukyanchuk (loan return to (Ukraine) Dynamo Kyiv)
—	DF	UKR	Temur Partsvania
—	DF	UKR	Dmytro Petryk (to (Czech Republic) Dukla Prague)
—	DF	UKR	Artem Shabanov (to (Ukraine) Dynamo Kyiv)
—	DF	UKR	Vyacheslav Lukhtanov (to (Belarus) Smolevichi)
—	MF	BRA	Guttiner Tenorio (to (Ukraine) Chornomorets Odesa)
—	MF	UKR	Andriy Bohdanov (to (Poland) Arka Gdynia)
—	MF	UKR	Oleksandr Mihunov (loan return to (Ukraine) Shakhtar Donetsk)
—	MF	UKR	Anton Postupalenko (to (Belarus) Torpedo-BelAZ Zhodino)
—	MF	UKR	Serhiy Rusyan (to (Ukraine) FC Oleksandriya)
—	MF	UKR	Stanislav Sharay (on loan to (Ukraine) Avanhard Kramatorsk)
—	MF	UKR	Serhiy Shestakov (to (Hungary) Diósgyőri VTK)
—	MF	UKR	Volodymyr Zubashevskyi (to (Czech Republic) Dukla Prague)
—	FW	UKR	Ilya Mikhalyov (to (Georgia (country)) Kolkheti Poti)
—	FW	UKR	Volodymyr Pryyomov (to (Brunei) DPMM)
—	FW	MAR	Moha Rharsalla (to (Slovakia) Slovan Bratislava)
—	FW	UKR	Oleksandr Voytiuk (to (Slovakia) Trenčín)

=== Shakhtar Donetsk ===
In:

No.	Pos.	Nation	Player
—	DF	UKR	Taras Kacharaba (loan return from (Ukraine) Zirka Kropyvnytskyi)
—	DF	UKR	Mykola Matviyenko (loan return from (Ukraine) Vorskla Poltava)
—	DF	UKR	Mykhaylo Pysko (loan return from (Belarus) Gomel)
—	DF	BRA	Dodô (from (Brazil) Coritiba)
—	MF	UKR	Dmytro Hrechyshkin (loan return from (Ukraine) Zorya Luhansk)
—	MF	UKR	Serhiy Hryn (loan return from (Ukraine) Veres Rivne)
—	MF	UKR	Oleksandr Mihunov (loan return from (Ukraine) Olimpik Donetsk)
—	MF	UKR	Vyacheslav Tankovskyi (loan return from (Ukraine) FC Mariupol)
—	MF	UKR	Serhiy Vakulenko (loan return from (Ukraine) FC Mariupol)
—	MF	BRA	Wellington Nem (loan return from (Brazil) São Paulo)
—	FW	UKR	Pylyp Budkivskyi (loan return from (Belgium) Kortrijk)
—	FW	UKR	Ruslan Fomin (from (Ukraine) FC Mariupol)
—	FW	NGA	Olarenwaju Kayode (on loan from (England) Manchester City)
—	FW	UKR	Artur Zahorulko (loan return from (Ukraine) Vorskla Poltava)

Out:

No.	Pos.	Nation	Player
—	GK	UKR	Andriy Bubentsov (to (Ukraine) PFC Sumy)
—	DF	BRA	Márcio Azevedo (on loan to (Greece) PAOK)
—	DF	UKR	Taras Kacharaba (on loan to (Czech Republic) Slovan Liberec)
—	DF	UKR	Oleksandr Masalov (on loan to (Ukraine) Kolos Kovalivka)
—	DF	UKR	Mykhaylo Pysko (to (Ukraine) Rukh Vynnyky)
—	MF	UKR	Danylo Ihnatenko (on loan to (Ukraine) FC Mariupol)
—	MF	UKR	Yuriy Hluschuk (to (Ukraine) Vorskla Poltava)
—	MF	UKR	Serhiy Hryn (on loan to (Ukraine) Arsenal Kyiv)
—	MF	UKR	Oleksandr Mihunov (to (Kazakhstan) Shakhter Karagandy)
—	MF	UKR	Oleksandr Pikhalyonok (on loan to (Ukraine) FC Mariupol)
—	MF	UKR	Serhiy Vakulenko (on loan to (Ukraine) Olimpik Donetsk)
—	MF	UKR	Oleksiy Zinkevych (to (Ukraine) FC Oleksandriya)
—	FW	UKR	Denys Arendaruk (on loan to (Ukraine) FC Mariupol)
—	FW	UKR	Pylyp Budkivskyi (on loan to (Russia) Anzhi Makhachkala)

=== Stal Kamianske ===
In:

No.	Pos.	Nation	Player
—	GK	UKR	Ivan Siletskyi (from (Ukraine) Karpaty Lviv)
—	DF	BRA	Ebert (from (Brazil) Itumbiara)
—	DF	BRA	Johnathan (from (Brazil) Goiás B)
—	DF	UKR	Ihor Oshchypko (from (Ukraine) FC Lviv)
—	DF	UKR	Bohdan Rudyuk (from (Belarus) Krumkachy Minsk)
—	MF	BRA	Thiago Rômulo (from (Brazil) Anapolina)
—	FW	UKR	Anatoliy Nuriyev (from (Ukraine) Munkach Mukachevo)

Out:

No.	Pos.	Nation	Player
—	DF	UKR	Yevhen Tkachuk (to (Kazakhstan) Shakhter Karagandy)
—	DF	UKR	Oleksandr Tymchyk (loan return to (Ukraine) Dynamo Kyiv)
—	MF	ARM	Edgar Malakyan (to (Kazakhstan) Zhetysu)
—	MF	UKR	Bohdan Mykhaylychenko (loan return to (Ukraine) Dynamo Kyiv)
—	FW	UKR	Oleksiy Schebetun (loan return to (Ukraine) Dynamo Kyiv)
—	FW	SRB	Nemanja Obradović (to (Finland) Honka)

=== Veres Rivne ===
In:

No.	Pos.	Nation	Player
—	GK	UKR	Bohdan Sarnavskyi (from (Ukraine) Vorskla Poltava)
—	DF	UKR	Mykyta Kamenyuka (on loan from (Ukraine) Zorya Luhansk)
—	DF	UKR	Pavlo Lukyanchuk (on loan from (Ukraine) Dynamo Kyiv)
—	DF	BRA	Pepe (from (Brazil) Osasco Audax)
—	DF	UKR	Vladyslav Pryimak (from (Ukraine) Prykarpattia Ivano-Frankivsk)
—	MF	UKR	Maksym Kalenchuk (from (Ukraine) Oleksandriya)
—	MF	UKR	Denys Kozhanov (from (Ukraine) Mariupol)
—	MF	UKR	Pavlo Myahkov (from (Belarus) Minsk)
—	FW	BRA	Julio Cesar
—	FW	UKR	Stanislav Kulish (from (Ukraine) Oleksandriya)

Out:

No.	Pos.	Nation	Player
—	GK	UKR	Bohdan Kohut (to (Ukraine) Volyn Lutsk)
—	DF	UKR	Mykola Ischenko (to (Ukraine) Chornomorets Odesa)
—	DF	UKR	Kyrylo Nedozhdiy (to (Ukraine) Cherkaskyi Dnipro)
—	DF	UKR	Vitaliy Parkhuts (to (Ukraine) FC Lviv)
—	MF	ESP	Edgar Caparrós
—	MF	UKR	Serhiy Hryn (loan return to (Ukraine) Shakhtar Donetsk)
—	MF	UKR	Vasyl Kobin (to (Kazakhstan) Tobol)
—	MF	UKR	Anton Kotlyar (to (Ukraine) Helios Kharkiv)
—	MF	UKR	Valeriy Kucherov (to (Ukraine) Arsenal Kyiv)
—	MF	UKR	Vyacheslav Orel (to (Ukraine) Cherkaskyi Dnipro)
—	MF	UKR	Hennadiy Pasich (to (Ukraine) Olimpik Donetsk)
—	MF	UKR	Yevhen Pasich (to (Ukraine) Olimpik Donetsk)
—	MF	UKR	Oleksandr Savoshko (loan return to (Ukraine) FC Lviv)
—	FW	UKR	Vasyl Palahnyuk (to (Moldova) Dacia Chișinău)
—	FW	UKR	Mykhaylo Serhiychuk (to (Ukraine) Vorskla Poltava)

=== Vorskla Poltava ===
In:

No.	Pos.	Nation	Player
—	GK	UKR	Danylo Kanevtsev (from (Ukraine) Metalist 1925 Kharkiv)
—	DF	UKR	Ihor Honchar (free agent)
—	MF	UKR	Yuriy Hluschuk (from (Ukraine) Shakhtar Donetsk)
—	FW	UKR	Mykhaylo Serhiychuk (from (Ukraine) Veres Rivne)
—	FW	UKR	Denys Vasin (from (Ukraine) Chornomorets Odesa)

Out:

No.	Pos.	Nation	Player
—	GK	UKR	Bohdan Sarnavskyi (to (Ukraine) Veres Rivne)
—	DF	UKR	Roman Kunyev (to (Ukraine) Hirnyk-Sport Horishni Plavni)
—	DF	UKR	Mykola Matviyenko (loan return to (Ukraine) Shakhtar Donetsk)
—	MF	UKR	Andriy Tkachuk (to (Kazakhstan) Akzhayik)
—	FW	UKR	Nazariy Mukha (to (Ukraine) Volyn Lutsk)
—	FW	UKR	Artur Zahorulko (loan return to (Ukraine) Shakhtar Donetsk)
—	FW	UKR	Mykhaylo Udod (to (Ukraine) Avanhard Kramatorsk)

=== Zirka Kropyvnytskyi ===
In:

No.	Pos.	Nation	Player
—	DF	UKR	Anton Bratkov (from (Ukraine) Desna Chernihiv)
—	DF	ALG	Adel Gafaiti (from (France) Toulouse Rodéo)
—	DF	FRA	Julian Rullier (free agent)
—	DF	UKR	Vladyslav Veremeyev (from (Ukraine) Chornomorets Odesa)
—	MF	FRA	Momar Bangoura (free agent)
—	MF	UKR	Dmytro Bilonoh (from (Russia) Ural Yekaterinburg)
—	MF	UKR	Yaroslav Yampol (from (Ukraine) PFC Sumy)
—	FW	UKR	Yaroslav Dovhyi (from (Ukraine) Oleksandriya)
—	FW	UKR	Aderinsola Habib Eseola (loan return from (Ukraine) Arsenal Kyiv)

Out:

No.	Pos.	Nation	Player
—	DF	UKR	Oleksandr Zozulya
—	DF	UKR	Taras Kacharaba (loan return to (Ukraine) Shakhtar Donetsk)
—	MF	BRA	Bruninho (to (Lithuania) Atlantas Klaipėda)
—	MF	ESP	Marc Castells (to (Spain) Castellón)
—	MF	UKR	Oleksandr Dovhyi (to (Ukraine) Inhulets-2 Petrove)
—	MF	UKR	Artem Favorov (to (Ukraine) Desna Chernihiv)
—	FW	UKR	Aderinsola Habib Eseola (on loan to (Kazakhstan) Akzhayik)
—	FW	UKR	Andriy Kapelyan (to (Ukraine) Nyva Ternopil)

=== Zorya Luhansk ===
In:

No.	Pos.	Nation	Player
—	GK	BRA	Luiz Felipe (from (Brazil) Internacional)
—	DF	MAR	Mohamed El Bouazzati (free agent)
—	DF	UKR	Dmytro Lytvyn (from (Portugal) Real S.C.)
—	DF	UKR	Tymofiy Sukhar (from (Ukraine) SC Dnipro-1)
—	DF	UKR	Oleksandr Tymchyk (on loan from (Ukraine) Dynamo Kyiv)
—	MF	CMR	Gaël Ondoua (free agent)
—	MF	UKR	Artem Mylchenko ((on loan?) from (Ukraine) Dynamo Kyiv)
—	FW	FRA	David Faupala (free agent)

Out:

No.	Pos.	Nation	Player
—	GK	UKR	Oleksiy Shevchenko (to (Ukraine) Karpaty Lviv)
—	GK	UKR	Andriy Shutko (to (Ukraine) FC Nikopol)
—	DF	UKR	Mykyta Kamenyuka (on loan to (Ukraine) Veres Rivne)
—	DF	UKR	Andriy Pylyavskyi (loan return to (Russia) Rubin Kazan)
—	DF	UKR	Artem Sukhotskyi (to (Slovakia) Slovan Bratislava)
—	MF	UKR	Dmytro Hrechyshkin (loan return to (Ukraine) Shakhtar Donetsk)
—	MF	UKR	Vladyslav Kalitvintsev (loan return to (Ukraine) Dynamo Kyiv)
—	MF	UKR	Stanislav Nechyporenko (to (Ukraine) Avanhard Kramatorsk)
—	MF	UKR	Vladyslav Yemets (to (Ukraine) Avanhard Kramatorsk)
—	MF	BRA	Leônidas (to (Ukraine) Olimpik Donetsk)
—	FW	BRA	Paulinho (to (Bulgaria) Levski Sofia)
