= Bobko (surname) =

Bobko, Бобко, Belarusian Бабко is a Slavic surname. Notable people with the surname include:

- Karol J. Bobko (1937–2023), American astronaut and test pilot
- Igor Bobko (born 1985), Belarusian footballer
- Ivan Bobko (born 1990), Ukrainian footballer
