= Kaverin =

Kaverin (Russian: Каве́рин, Ukrainian: Каверін) is surname of:

- Veniamin Kaverin, né Zil'ber (1902, Pskov – 1989), Soviet writer
- Vitaliy Kaverin (born 1990), Ukrainian footballer

== See also ==
- 1976 Kaverin, a main-belt asteroid
