= Fousseni =

Fousseni is a given name. Notable people with the name include:

- Fousseni Bamba (born 1990), Ivorian footballer
- Fousseni Diabaté (born 1995), Malian footballer
- Fousseni Diawara (born 1980), Malian footballer
