= Viktor Serdenyuk =

Ukrainian footballer

Viktor Serdeniuk
Personal information
- Full name: Viktor Serhiyovych Serdeniuk
- Date of birth: 27 January 1996 (age 30)
- Place of birth: Artsyz, Ukraine
- Height: 1.82 m (5 ft 11 1/2 in)
- Position: Midfielder

Team information
- Current team: Home Farm
- Number: 6

Youth career
- 2009–2012: Chornomorets Odesa

Senior career*
Years	Team	Apps	(Gls)
2012–2016	Chornomorets Odesa	0	(0)
2016–2017	Real Pharma Odesa	26	(1)
2017–2018	Chornomorets Odesa	2	(0)
2018–2019	→ Zhemchuzhyna Odesa (loan)	35	(0)
2018–2019	Kremin Kremenchuk	25	(2)
2019–2022	Balkany Zorya	63	(2)
2022	Shamrock Rovers	3	(0)
2023–2024	Longford Town	51	(0)
2025–2026	Balbriggan	10	(1)
2026–	Home Farm	3	(0)

International career
2012	Ukraine U16	4	(0)
2012	Ukraine U17	3	(0)
- * Club domestic league appearances and goals as of 18 November 2026

Viktor Serdeniuk (Ukrainian: Віктор Сергійович Серденюк; born 27 January 1996) is a Ukrainian professional footballer who plays as a midfielder for Irish club Home Farm.

== Career ==
=== Early Career ===
Born in Artsyz, Serdenyuk is a product of the FC Chornomorets youth system.

=== Chornomorets Odesa ===
He played for Chornomorets Odesa in the Ukrainian Premier League Reserves and transferred to Real Pharma Odesa in July 2016. But one year later, in July 2017, Serdenyuk returned again to FC Chornomorets in the Ukrainian Premier League. He made his debut on 22 July 2017 against FC Stal Kamianske.

=== Shamrock Rovers ===
On 1 September 2022, he signed for League of Ireland Premier Division club Shamrock Rovers, having previously moved to Ireland to escape the 2022 Russian Invasion of Ukraine, rather than stay and fight. In doing so, he became the first Ukrainian player to play in the Irish Premier Division. He also won the 2022 League of Ireland Premier Division with Shamrock Rovers.

=== Longford Town ===
On 3 January 2023, it was announced that he had signed for League of Ireland First Division side Longford Town where he spent two seasons.

=== Home Farm ===
In 2025 he played for Balbriggan making 10 appearances and scoring 1 goal. In 2026 he plays for Home Farm in FAI National League.

== Career statistics ==
As of match played 22 November 2026

Appearances and goals by club, season and competition
Club	Season	League			Cup		Europe		Other		Total	
Club	Season	Division	Apps	Goals	Apps	Goals	Apps	Goals	Apps	Goals	Apps	Goals
Real Pharma Odesa	2016–17	Ukrainian Second League	26	1	1	0	0	0	0	0	27	1
Chornomorets Odesa	2017–18	Ukrainian Premier League	2	0	0	0	0	0	0	0	2	0
Zhemchuzhyna Odesa (Loan)	2017–18	Ukrainian First League	9	0	0	0	0	0	0	0	9	0
Zhemchuzhyna Odesa (Loan)	2018–19	Ukrainian First League	24	2	0	0	0	0	1	0	25	2
Kremin Kremenchuk	2018–19	Ukrainian Second League	25	2	0	0	0	0	0	0	25	2
Balkany Zorya	2019–20	Ukrainian First League	23	0	2	0	0	0	0	0	25	0
Balkany Zorya	2020–21	Ukrainian Second League	19	1	1	0	0	0	0	0	20	1
Balkany Zorya	2021–22	Ukrainian Second League	19	1	2	1	0	0	0	0	21	2
Shamrock Rovers	2022	Ireland Premier Division	3	0	0	0	0	0	0	0	3	0
Shamrock Rovers	2023	Ireland Premier Division	0	0	0	0	2 (Note: Appearances in UEFA Conference League)	0	0	0	2	0
Longford Town	2022	Ireland First Division	31	0	1	0	0	0	0	0	32	0
Longford Town	2024	Ireland First Division	20	0	1	0	0	0	0	0	21	0
Home Farm	2026	FAI National League	3	0	0	0	0	0	1	0	4	0
Career total			204	7	8	1	2	0	2	0	216	8

== Honours ==
Shamrock Rovers

- League of Ireland Premier Division: 2022

Kremin Kremenchuk

- Ukrainian Second League: 2018–19

Chornomorets Odesa

- Ukrainian Cup: Runner-Up 2012–13
