= Denys Balan =

Ukrainian footballer (born 1993)

Personal information
- Full name: Denys Dmytrovych Balan
- Date of birth: 18 August 1993 (age 33)
- Place of birth: Odesa, Ukraine
- Height: 1.77 m (5 ft 10 in)
- Position: Defender

Team information
- Current team: Feniks-Mariupol
- Number: 39

Youth career
- 2000–2008: DYuSSh-11 Odesa
- 2009–2010: Dynamo Kyiv

Senior career*
Years	Team	Apps	(Gls)
2010–2014	Dynamo Kyiv	0	(0)
2012	→ Dnipro Dnipropetrovsk (loan)	0	(0)
2013	→ Dynamo-2 Kyiv	8	(0)
2014–2015	Real Pharma Odesa	25	(1)
2015–2017	Cherkaskyi Dnipro	33	(0)
2017	Chornomorets Odesa	3	(0)
2017–2021	Inhulets Petrove	85	(3)
2021–2022	Kryvbas Kryvyi Rih	16	(0)
2022	Táborsko	0	(0)
2022	Zlaté Moravce	6	(0)
2023–2024	Veres Rivne	28	(1)
2025	Podillya Khmelnytskyi	8	(0)
2025–	Feniks-Mariupol	26	(2)

International career^{‡}
2009	Ukraine U16	9	(0)
2009–2010	Ukraine U17	13	(0)
2010–2011	Ukraine U18	10	(0)
2011–2012	Ukraine U19	8	(0)
- * Club domestic league appearances and goals as of 4 June 2026 ‡ National team caps and goals as of 21 October 2022

Denys Dmytrovych Balan (Ukrainian: Денис Дмитрович Балан; born 18 August 1993) is a Ukrainian professional footballer who plays as a defender for Feniks-Mariupol.

== Club career ==
=== Early years ===
Balan is a product of the DYuSSh-11 in his native city Odesa and Dynamo Kyiv academies.

He played for Dynamo Kyiv and Dnipro Dnipropetrovsk in the Ukrainian Premier League Reserves and then in the Ukrainian Second League and Ukrainian First League until July 2017, when he signed contract with Chornomorets Odesa.

In December 2022, he signed a one-and-a-half-year contract with Veres Rivne in the Ukrainian Premier League.
