= Vitaliy Parkhuts =

Ukrainian footballer

Personal information
- Full name: Vitaliy Volodymyrovych Parkhuts
- Date of birth: 18 January 1997 (age 29)
- Place of birth: Luchyntsi, Ivano-Frankivsk Oblast, Ukraine
- Height: 1.90 m (6 ft 3 in)
- Position: Centre-back

Youth career
- 2011–2013: Enerhetyk Burshtyn
- 2013: Karpaty Halych

Senior career*
Years	Team	Apps	(Gls)
2014–2015	Enerhiya Burshtyn	23	(2)
2016–2017	Teplovyk-DYuSSh-3 Ivano-Frankivsk	32	(1)
2017–2018	Veres Rivne	0	(0)
2018	Lviv	5	(0)
2018–2019	Karpaty Halych	5	(0)
2019–2020	Prykarpattia-Teplovyk Ivano-Frankivsk	22	(1)
2020–2022	Prykarpattia Ivano-Frankivsk	13	(0)
- * Club domestic league appearances and goals as of 14 June 2023

Vitaliy Volodymyrovych Parkhuts (Ukrainian: Віталій Володимирович Пархуць; born 18 January 1997) is a Ukrainian professional footballer who plays as a centre-back.
