= Oleksiy Antonov =

Ukrainian former footballer

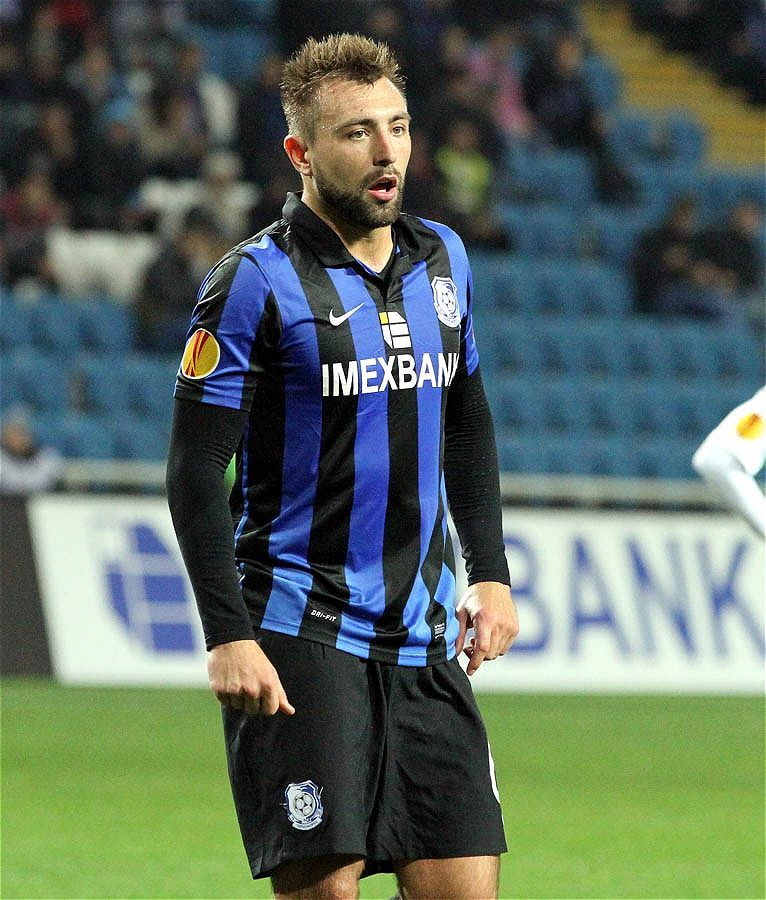

Personal information
- Full name: Oleksiy Hennadiyovych Antonov
- Date of birth: 8 May 1986 (age 40)
- Place of birth: Pavlohrad, Soviet Union
- Height: 1.79 m (5 ft 10 1/2 in)
- Position: Striker

Team information
- Current team: Chornomorets Odesa (assistant)

Youth career
- 1999–2001: UFK Dnipropetrovsk
- 2001: Dnipro Dnipropetrovsk
- 2001–2002: UFK Dnipropetrovsk
- 2002: Dnipro Dnipropetrovsk
- 2002–2003: UFK Dnipropetrovsk
- 2003: Metalurh Zaporizhya

Senior career*
Years	Team	Apps	(Gls)
2003–2004	Dnipro Dnipropetrovsk	0	(0)
2003–2004	→ Dnipro-2 Dnipropetrovsk	24	(8)
2004–2007	Kuban Krasnodar	5	(1)
2007–2010	Metalist Kharkiv	33	(7)
2008–2009	→ Zorya Luhansk (loan)	37	(4)
2010–2011	Illichivets Mariupol	23	(11)
2011–2013	Dnipro Dnipropetrovsk	11	(4)
2012–2013	→ Kryvbas Kryvyi Rih (loan)	31	(11)
2013–2014	Chornomorets Odesa	43	(15)
2014–2015	Aktobe	19	(9)
2015–2016	Gabala	32	(7)
2017	Gyirmót SE	5	(0)
2017	Chornomorets Odesa	7	(0)
2018	Ventspils	11	(3)
Total		281	(80)

International career
2003	Ukraine-17	6	(1)
2003–2004	Ukraine-18	9	(8)
2007	Ukraine-21	9	(4)
2011–2014	Ukraine	2	(0)

Managerial career
- 2020–2021: Chornomorets Odesa (assistant)
- 2021: Chornomorets Odesa
- 2021–: Chornomorets Odesa (assistant)
- * Club domestic league appearances and goals

Oleksiy Hennadiyovych Antonov (Ukrainian: Олексій Геннадійович Антонов; born 8 May 1986) is a Ukrainian retired footballer and current assistant coach for Chornomorets Odesa.

== Career ==
On 12 June 2014, Antonov joined Kazakhstan Premier League side Aktobe on a 2.5year contract. After a year with Aktobe, Antonov signed a two-year contract with Azerbaijan Premier League side Gabala FK on 19 June 2015. Antonov parted company with Gabala on 19 July 2016.

On 1 March 2017, Antonov signed a six-month contract with Gyirmót SE. His contract was terminated on 4 May 2017.

== Career statistics ==
=== Club ===
As of match played 12 April 2017

Club	Season	League			National Cup		Continental		Other		Total	
Club	Season	Division	Apps	Goals	Apps	Goals	Apps	Goals	Apps	Goals	Apps	Goals
Dnipro-2 Dnipropetrovsk	2002–03	Ukrainian Second League	6	1			-		-		6	1
Dnipro-2 Dnipropetrovsk	2003–04	Ukrainian Second League	18	7			-		-		18	7
Dnipro-2 Dnipropetrovsk	Total		24	8	0	0	0	0	0	0	24	8
Kuban Krasnodar	2004	Russian Premier League	0	0			-		-		0	0
Kuban Krasnodar	2005	Russian National League	2	0			-		-		2	0
Kuban Krasnodar	2006	Russian National League	3	1			-		-		3	1
Kuban Krasnodar	Total		5	1	0	0	0	0	0	0	5	1
Metalist Kharkiv	2006–07	Vyshcha Liha	8	4			-		-		0	0
Metalist Kharkiv	2007–08	Vyshcha Liha	18	2			1	0	-		19	2
Metalist Kharkiv	Total		26	6	0	0	1	0	0	0	27	6
Zorya Luhansk (loan)	2007–08	Vyshcha Liha	9	1			-		-		9	1
Zorya Luhansk (loan)	2008–09	Ukrainian Premier League	13	3			-		-		13	3
Zorya Luhansk (loan)	2009–10	Ukrainian Premier League	15	0	1	0	-		-		15	0
Zorya Luhansk (loan)	Total		37	4	1	0	0	0	0	0	38	4
Illichivets Mariupol	2010–11	Ukrainian Premier League	23	11	1	0	-		-		24	11
Dnipro Dnipropetrovsk	2011–12	Ukrainian Premier League	10	4	0	0	1	0	-		11	4
Kryvbas Kryvyi Rih	2011–12	Ukrainian Premier League	7	1	0	0	-		-		7	1
Kryvbas Kryvyi Rih	2012–13	Ukrainian Premier League	24	10	1	0	-		-		25	10
Kryvbas Kryvyi Rih	Total		31	11	1	0	0	0	0	0	32	11
Chornomorets Odesa	2013–14	Ukrainian Premier League	26	10	2	0	14	4	1	1	43	15
Aktobe	2014	Kazakhstan Premier League	16	8	4	1	6	1	-		26	10
Aktobe	2015	Kazakhstan Premier League	3	1	2	1	–		-		5	2
Aktobe	Total		19	9	6	2	6	1	0	0	31	12
Gabala	2015–16	Azerbaijan Premier League	32	7	3	0	14	1	-		49	8
Gyirmót SE	2016–17	Nemzeti Bajnokság I	5	0	0	0	-		-		5	0
Chornomorets Odesa	2017–18	Ukrainian Premier League	7	0	0	0	-		-		7	0
Ventspils	2018	Latvian Higher League	11	3	0	0	-		-		11	3
Career total			256	74	14	2	35	7	1	1	307	83

=== International ===
Ukraine
Year	Apps	Goals
2011	1	0
2014	1	0
Total	2	0

Statistics accurate as of match played 22 May 2014
