= Yevhen Zubeyko =

Ukrainian footballer

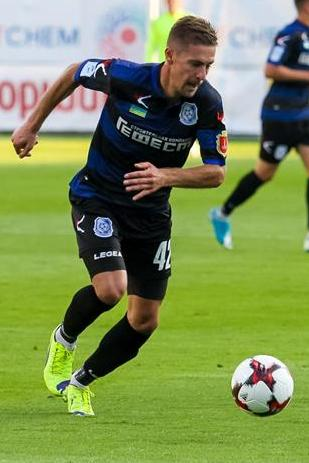

Personal information
- Full name: Yevhen Anatoliyovych Zubeyko
- Date of birth: 30 September 1989 (age 37)
- Place of birth: Artemivsk, Soviet Union (now Ukraine)
- Height: 1.79 m (5 ft 10 in)
- Position: Right back

Team information
- Current team: Fratria (youth coach)

Youth career
- 2002–2003: Shakhtar Donetsk
- 2003–2004: UOR Donetsk
- 2005–2006: UFK Dnipropetrovsk

Senior career*
Years	Team	Apps	(Gls)
2008–2014	Chornomorets Odesa	94	(0)
2008–2010	→ Chornomorets-2 Odesa	58	(8)
2015	Tosno	1	(0)
2015–2016	Metalist Kharkiv	17	(0)
2016–2017	Karpaty Lviv	16	(0)
2017–2018	Chornomorets Odesa	23	(0)
2018	Olimpik Donetsk	16	(0)
2019	Minsk	21	(2)
2020–2021	Chornomorets Odesa	17	(0)
2021	Viktoriya Mykolaivka	16	(0)
2022	Alians Lypova Dolyna	0	(0)
2022–2023	Eintracht Emseloh	22	(3)

Managerial career
- 2025–: Fratria (youth coach)
- * Club domestic league appearances and goals as of 17 June 2023

Yevhen Anatoliyovych Zubeyko (Ukrainian: Євген Анатолійович Зубейко; born 30 September 1989) is a Ukrainian professional footballer who plays as a right back and now youth coach of Fratria.
