= Mykyta Tatarkov =

Ukrainian footballer

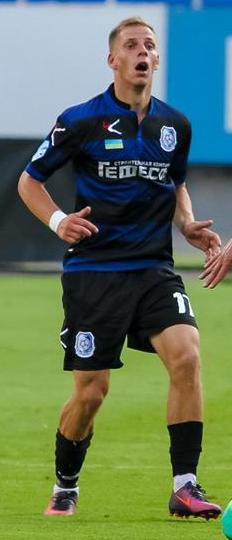
- Mykyta Tatarkov in 2017

Personal information
- Full name: Mykyta Stanislavovych Tatarkov
- Date of birth: 4 January 1995 (age 31)
- Place of birth: Zaporizhzhia, Ukraine
- Height: 1.74 m (5 ft 8 1/2 in)
- Position: Forward

Team information
- Current team: Vakhsh Bokhtar

Youth career
- 2008–2012: Metalurh Zaporizhya

Senior career*
Years	Team	Apps	(Gls)
2012–2015	Metalurh Zaporizhya	30	(1)
2016–2018	Chornomorets Odesa	68	(3)
2019	Shakhtyor Soligorsk	8	(0)
2019–2020	Lviv	19	(2)
2020	Vorskla Poltava	1	(0)
2021	Pyunik Yervean	12	(2)
2021–2024	Kryvbas Kryvyi Rih	61	(0)
2025	UCSA Tarasivka	4	(0)
2025–2026	Vorskla Poltava	15	(2)
2026–	Vakhsh Bokhtar	0	(0)

International career
2013	Ukraine U19	2	(0)
2014–2015	Ukraine U20	8	(0)
- * Club domestic league appearances and goals as of 8 March 2026

Mykyta Tatarkov (Ukrainian: Микита Станіславович Татарков; born 4 January 1995) is a Ukrainian professional footballer who plays as a forward for Tajikistan Higher League club Vakhsh Bokhtar.

== Career ==
Tatarkov is a product of the youth team system of FC Metalurh Zaporizhya. He made his debut for FC Metalurh entering as a first half-time substitution playing against FC Chornomorets Odesa on 6 April 2014 in the Ukrainian Premier League.

In January 2016 he signed a contract with another Ukrainian Premier League side FC Chornomorets Odesa.
