= Vyacheslav Orel =

Ukrainian footballer

Personal information
- Full name: Vyacheslav Anatoliyovych Orel
- Date of birth: 5 September 1997 (age 29)
- Place of birth: Ukraine
- Height: 1.76 m (5 ft 9 in)
- Position: Defensive midfielder

Youth career
- 2010–2014: SDYuSShOR Cherkasy
- 2016–2017: Cherkaskyi Dnipro

Senior career*
Years	Team	Apps	(Gls)
2014	Urahan Kryvonosivka		
2015–2016	Cherkaskyi Dnipro-2	29	(2)
2017	Veres Rivne	0	(0)
2018–2020	Cherkashchyna	13	(0)
2020–2021	Dnipro Cherkasy	18	(0)
2021	Kremin Kremenchuk	12	(0)
- * Club domestic league appearances and goals as of 18 February 2022

Vyacheslav Anatoliyovych Orel (Ukrainian: Вячеслав Анатолійович Орел; born on 5 September 1997) is a Ukrainian professional footballer who plays as a defensive midfielder.
