= Serhiy Lyulka =

Ukrainian footballer

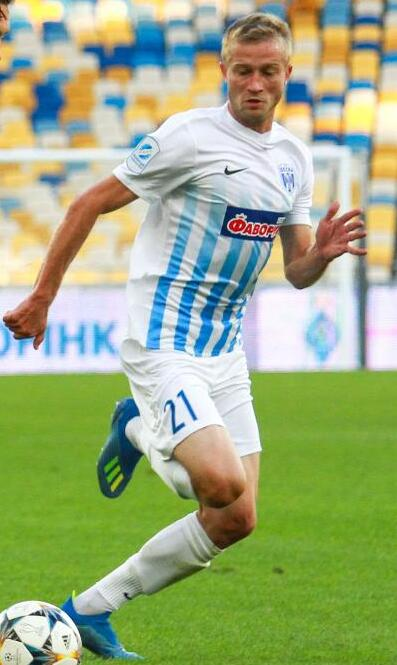

Personal information
- Full name: Serhiy Mykolayovych Lyulka
- Date of birth: 22 February 1990 (age 36)
- Place of birth: Kyiv, Ukrainian SSR
- Height: 1.78 m (5 ft 10 in)
- Position: Defender

Youth career
- 2003–2007: Dynamo Kyiv

Senior career*
Years	Team	Apps	(Gls)
2007–2015	Dynamo Kyiv	0	(0)
2007–2008	→ Dynamo-3 Kyiv	6	(0)
2008–2012	→ Dynamo-2 Kyiv	70	(1)
2012	→ Slovan Liberec (loan)	12	(0)
2013–2015	→ Hoverla Uzhhorod (loan)	60	(0)
2016	Slovan Liberec	1	(0)
2016–2018	Chornomorets Odesa	45	(0)
2018–2019	Desna Chernihiv	13	(0)
2019–2020	Lviv	19	(0)
2020–2022	Metalist Kharkiv	24	(2)

International career^{‡}
2009	Ukraine U19	3	(0)
2010	Ukraine U20	2	(0)
2012	Ukraine U21	7	(0)
Medal record
Men's football
Representing Ukraine
UEFA European Under-19 Championship
Winner	2009 Ukraine
- * Club domestic league appearances and goals as of 8 December 2021 ‡ National team caps and goals as of 15 June 2018

Serhiy Mykolayovych Lyulka (Ukrainian: Сергій Миколайович Люлька; born 22 February 1990) is a Ukrainian retired professional footballer who played as a defender.

== Career ==
He is a product of Dynamo Kyiv football academy.

== Honours ==
Metalist Kharkiv

- Ukrainian Second League: 2020-21

Ukraine U19

- UEFA European Under-19 Championship: 2009
