= Vladyslav Shchetinin =

Ukrainian footballer

Personal information
- Full name: Vladyslav Serhiyovych Shchetinin
- Date of birth: 29 August 1997 (age 29)
- Place of birth: Ukraine
- Height: 1.78 m (5 ft 10 in)
- Position: Defender

Youth career
- 2010–2014: Chornomorets Odessa

Senior career*
| Years | Team | Apps | (Gls) |
| 2014–2018 | Chornomorets Odessa | 3 | (0) |
| 2018 | → Zhemchuzhyna Odesa (loan) | 8 | (0) |
| 2018 | Kremin Kremenchuk | 0 | (0) |
- * Club domestic league appearances and goals as of 23 November 2018

Vladyslav Serhiyovych Shchetinin (Ukrainian: Владислав Сергійович Щетінін; born 29 August 1997) is a Ukrainian professional football defender.

== Career ==
Shchetinin is а product of youth team system of FC Chornomorets. Made his debut for FC Chornomorets in the game against FC Karpaty Lviv on 10 May 2015 in the Ukrainian Premier League.
