= Guttiner =

Brazilian footballer (born 1994)

Gucci
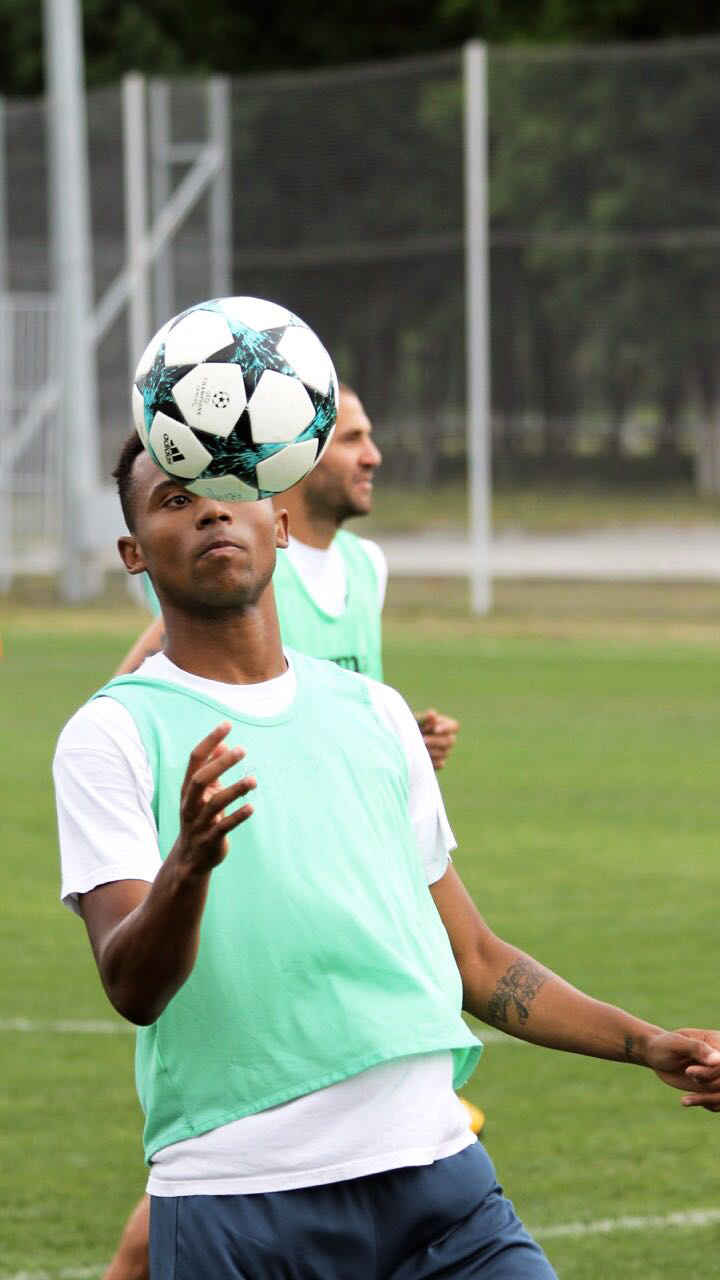

Personal information
- Full name: Guttiner Heider Fernando Costa Tenorio
- Date of birth: 6 October 1994 (age 32)
- Place of birth: Minas Gerais, Brazil
- Height: 1.79 m (5 ft 10 in)
- Position: Midfielder

Team information
- Current team: Bankhai United
- Number: 9

Youth career
- 2011: América Mineiro
- 2012: Guarani
- 2013: Osasco Audax
- 2014: Audax Rio de Janeiro
- 2014: Rio Claro
- 2014: Portuguesa

Senior career*
Years	Team	Apps	(Gls)
2015	Bonsucesso	6	(0)
2016	Linense		
2016–2017	Vitória das Tabocas	17	(0)
2017	Olimpik Donetsk	4	(0)
2018	Chornomorets Odesa	7	(0)
2018	Hibernians	7	(1)
2019	Obolon-Brovar Kyiv	4	(0)
2019	Viktoria Žižkov	4	(0)
2019–2020	Obolon Kyiv	22	(4)
2021	Avanhard Kramatorsk	11	(1)
2021	Navbahor Namangan	12	(1)
2022	Stomil Olsztyn	3	(0)
2022	Zakho		(1)
2023	Naft Al-Wasat		
2024	Esperanza SC	3	(0)
2024	Marsaxlokk	0	(0)
2024–2025	Masfout		
2025	Al Jazirah Al-Hamra		
2025–	Bankhai United		
- * Club domestic league appearances and goals as of 6 October 2024

Guttiner Heider Fernando Costa Tenorio (born 6 October 1994), commonly known as Gucci, is a Brazilian professional footballer who plays as a midfielder for Bankhai United.

== Career ==
Guttiner is a player who started in the basic categories of América Futebol Clube (Belo Horizonte) (MG) and began his professional career at Bonsucesso Futebol Clube, played in Associação Acadêmica e Desportiva Vitória das Tabocas (Recife).

In July 2017, he signed a 2 1/2-year deal with the Ukrainian Premier League's FC Olimpik Donetsk. In December 2017 contract was terminated and he left Ukrainian club. In February 2018, Guttiner signed for fellow Ukrainian Premier League side Chornomorets Odesa.
