= Vadym Yavorskyi =

Ukrainian footballer (born 1994)

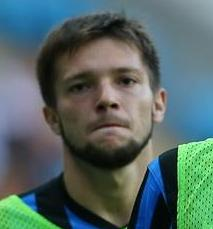
- Yavorskyi in 2015

Personal information
- Full name: Vadym Yuriyovych Yavorskyi
- Date of birth: 26 June 1994 (age 32)
- Place of birth: Odesa, Ukraine
- Height: 1.80 m (5 ft 11 in)
- Position: Striker

Youth career
- 2007–2011: Chornomorets Odesa

Senior career*
Years	Team	Apps	(Gls)
2011–2013	Chornomorets Odesa	0	(0)
2011	→ Chornomorets-2 Odesa	7	(0)
2012	→ SKA Odesa (loan)	23	(8)
2013	Kryvbas Kryvyi Rih	0	(0)
2013–2017	Chornomorets Odesa	9	(0)
2016	→ Hirnyk-Sport Komsomolsk (loan)	11	(6)
2016	→ Veres Rivne (loan)	4	(0)
2016–2017	→ Hirnyk-Sport Horishni Plavni (loan)	24	(3)
2017	→ Mykolaiv (loan)	17	(2)
2017	→ Mykolaiv-2 (loan)	1	(1)
2018	Sumy	21	(6)
2019	Dnipro-1	7	(2)
2019	Avanhard Kramatorsk	18	(9)
2020–2021	Mykolaiv	32	(10)
2021	→ Mykolaiv-2	1	(0)
2021–2022	Hirnyk-Sport Horishni Plavni	18	(3)
2022–2023	Cosmos Nowotaniec	24	(10)
2023–2024	Stal Rzeszów	5	(0)
2024–2025	Unia Skierniewice	41	(4)
2025–2026	Pelikan Łowicz	23	(6)
- * Club domestic league appearances and goals as of 08:47, 26 June 2026 (UTC)

Vadym Yuriyovych Yavorskyi (Ukrainian: Вадим Юрійович Яворський; born 26 June 1994) is a Ukrainian professional footballer who plays as a striker.

== Career ==
Yavorskyi is product of youth team systems of Chornomorets Odesa. He made his debut in a Ukrainian Premier League game against Shakhtar Donetsk on 13 September 2014.

== Honours ==
Cosmos Nowotaniec

- IV liga Subcarpathia: 2022–23
- Polish Cup (Krosno regionals): 2022–23

Unia Skierniewice

- III liga, group I: 2024–25
- Polish Cup (Łódź regionals): 2023–24

Pelikan Łowicz

- IV liga Łódź: 2025–26
