= Mykhaylo Plokhotnyuk =

Ukrainian footballer

Personal information
- Full name: Mykhaylo Vitaliyovych Plokhotnyuk
- Date of birth: 12 March 1999 (age 27)
- Place of birth: Odesa, Ukraine
- Height: 1.82 m (6 ft 0 in)
- Position: Forward

Youth career
- 2012–2019: Chornomorets Odesa
- 2017: → Dynamo Kyiv (loan)

Senior career*
Years	Team	Apps	(Gls)
2019–2020	Chornomorets-2 Odesa	14	(1)
2020–2022	Inhulets Petrove	21	(2)
2022	Politehnica Iași	21	(5)
2022–2023	CSM Slatina	8	(1)
2023	Dumbrăvița	8	(1)
2024	Nõmme United	16	(1)
2024	Mynai	3	(0)

International career^{‡}
2014	Ukraine U16	2	(0)
2015	Ukraine U17	3	(1)
2016	Ukraine U18	4	(2)
- * Club domestic league appearances and goals as of 31 December 2024 ‡ National team caps and goals as of 2 October 2020

Mykhaylo Vitaliyovych Plokhotnyuk (Ukrainian: Михайло Віталійович Плохотнюк; born 12 March 1999) is a Ukrainian professional footballer who plays as a forward.

== Career ==
Plokhotnyuk is a product of the Chornomorets Odesa youth sportive school.

=== Inhulets Petrove ===
In July 2020, he signed a contract with the Ukrainian First League team Inhulets Petrove and was promoted with this team to the Ukrainian Premier League one month later. Polokhotnyuk made his debut in the Ukrainian Premier League for Inhulets on 13 September 2020, playing in a losing away match against FC Vorskla Poltava as a second half-time substitute player.

Plokhotnyuk made his first start in the Ukrainian Premier League on 14 February 2021, away at SC Dnipro-1. Unfortunately, he received two yellow cards and was subsequently sent off, with his second booking occurring in the 89th minute.

On 3 April 2021, Plokhotnyuk scored his first goal in the Ukrainian Premier League in a 4-3 defeat against FC Mariupol in Kharkiv.

== Honours ==
Inhulets Petrove

- Ukrainian First League: 2019–20

Individual

- Top scorer: 2016–17 Ukrainian Premier League U-19 competitions
