= Artem Chorniy =

Ukrainian footballer

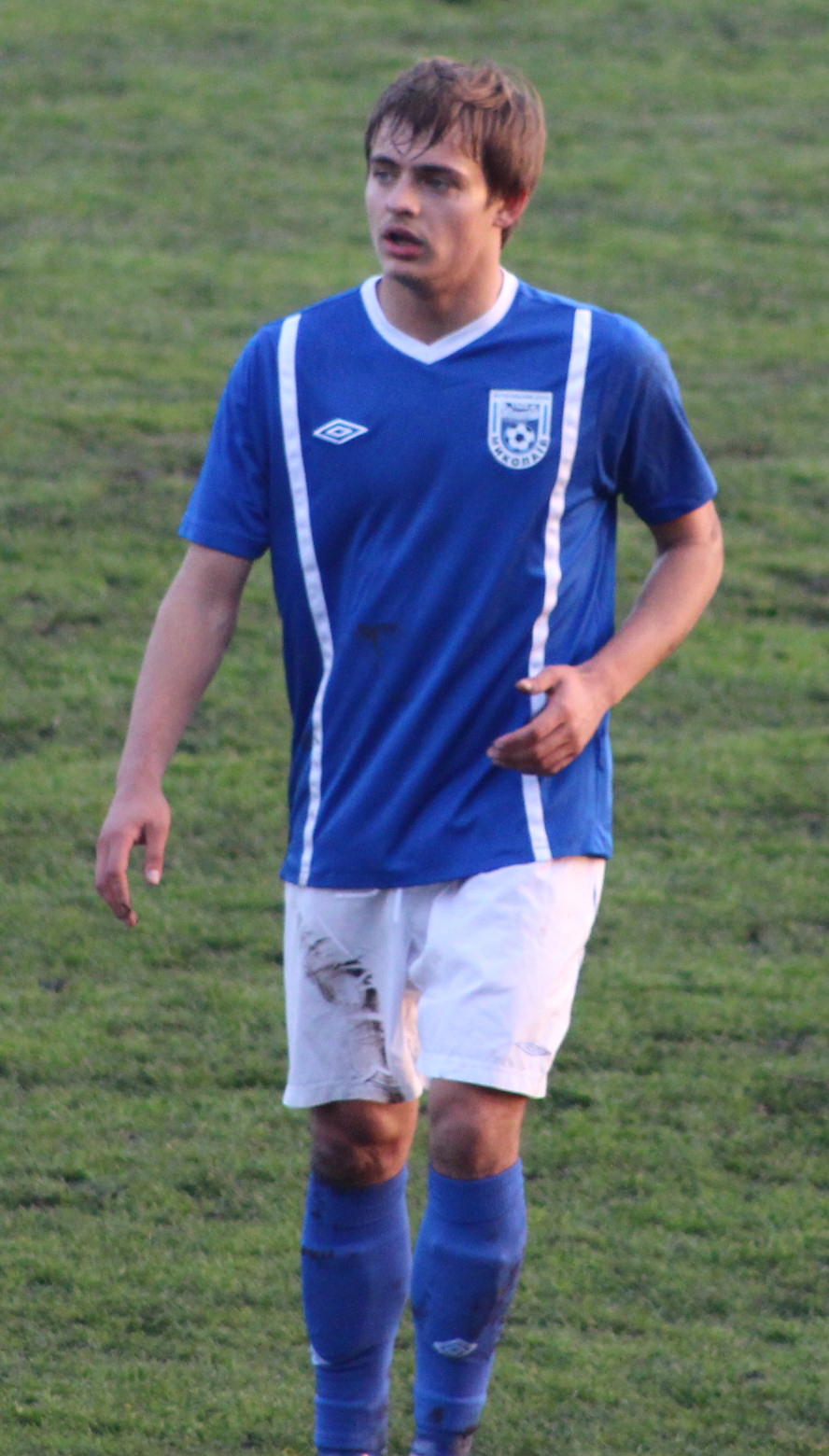
- Artem Chorniy in 2013

Personal information
- Full name: Artem Oleksandrovych Chorniy
- Date of birth: 23 October 1989 (age 37)
- Place of birth: Mykolaiv, Ukrainian SSR
- Height: 1.73 m (5 ft 8 in)
- Position: Midfielder

Youth career
- 1997–2002: Sportive School Mykolaiv
- 2002–2006: Mykolaiv

Senior career*
Years	Team	Apps	(Gls)
2006–2007	Mykolaiv	48	(4)
2008–2011	Illichivets Mariupol	8	(1)
2012–2013	Mykolaiv	57	(7)
2014–2017	Oleksandriya	72	(8)
2018–2019	Chornomorets Odesa	41	(3)
2020	Inhulets Petrove	0	(0)
- * Club domestic league appearances and goals as of 9 February 2020

Artem Chorniy (Ukrainian: Артем Олександрович Чорній; born 23 October 1989) is a professional Ukrainian football midfielder.

== Career ==
He is a product of different Mykolaiv City sportive schools.

In January 2014 Chorniy signed a contract with PFC Oleksandria in the Ukrainian First League.
