= Fousseni Bamba =

Ivorian footballer

Personal information
- Full name: Fousseni N'Ganon Bamba
- Date of birth: 19 April 1990 (age 36)
- Place of birth: Bingerville, Ivory Coast
- Height: 1.85 m (6 ft 1 in)
- Position: Centre back

Senior career*
Years	Team	Apps	(Gls)
2009–2011	ES Viry-Châtillon	9	(0)
2011–2012	Szeged 2011	11	(1)
2012–2013	Gloria Bistriţa	0	(0)
2013–2014	UJA Maccabi	11	(0)
2014–2016	Ayia Napa	33	(2)
2016	Slutsk	9	(1)
2016	Zugdidi	3	(0)
2017–2018	Chornomorets Odesa	14	(2)
2018–2019	Honvéd	8	(0)
2020	Rudar Velenje	1	(0)
2021–2023	Stade Beaucairois	46	(1)

International career^{‡}
	Ivory Coast U20	6	(0)
	Ivory Coast U23	3	(0)
2015	Guinea	2	(0)
- * Club domestic league appearances and goals as of 3 June 2023 ‡ National team caps and goals as of 8 September 2017

Fousseni Bamba (born 19 April 1990) is a professional footballer who plays as a centre back. Born in Ivory Coast, he has represented Guinea at senior international level. His younger brother, Yacouba, is also a footballer.
