= Andriy Novak =

Ukrainian footballer

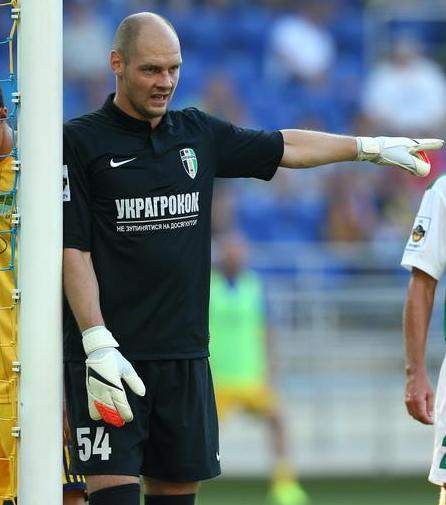

Personal information
- Full name: Andriy Yuriyovych Novak
- Date of birth: 6 December 1988 (age 37)
- Place of birth: Szczecin, Poland
- Height: 1.92 m (6 ft 4 in)
- Position: Goalkeeper

Team information
- Current team: Oleksandriya (goakeeping coach)

Youth career
- 2001–2002: Yunior Lysets
- 2002–2003: Sportive School #3 Ivano-Frankivsk
- 2003–2004: Spartak Ivano-Frankivsk
- 2004–2005: Sportive School #3 Ivano-Frankivsk

Senior career*
Years	Team	Apps	(Gls)
2005–2006	Chornohora Ivano-Frankivsk	20	(0)
2006–2007	Spartak Ivano-Frankivsk	28	(0)
2007–2011	Karpaty Lviv	1	(0)
2007–2008	→ Karpaty-2 Lviv	11	(0)
2010	→ Prykarpattya Ivano-Frankivsk (loan)	8	(0)
2011	Tiraspol	0	(0)
2011–2012	Enerhetyk Burshtyn	8	(0)
2012–2014	Nyva Ternopil	54	(0)
2014–2017	Oleksandriya	57	(0)
2017	Ermis Aradippou	2	(0)
2018	Chornomorets Odesa	7	(0)
2018–2022	Prykarpattia Ivano-Frankivsk	42	(0)
Total		238	(0)

International career
2008	Ukraine U21	1	(0)

Managerial career
- 2022–2023: Mynai (goalkeeping coach)
- 2024: Skala 1911 Stryi (goalkeeping coach)
- 2024–2026: Ahrobiznes Volochysk (goalkeeping coach)
- 2026–: Oleksandriya (goalkeeping coach)
- * Club domestic league appearances and goals

Andriy Yuriyovych Novak (Ukrainian: Андрій Юрійович Новак, Polish: Andrzej Nowak; born 6 December 1988) is a Ukrainian retired professional football goalkeeper and current goalkeeping coach of Oleksandriya.

Born in Poland, Novak moved to Ukraine after dissolution of the Soviet Union when he was about 6.

He started his coaching career in FC Mynai where he spent almost 2 years as part of the Volodymyr Sharan coaching staff.

On 21 June 2024, Novak joined the coaching staff of Ahrobiznes Volochysk as a goalkeeping coach.
