= Yuriy Romanyuk =

Ukrainian footballer

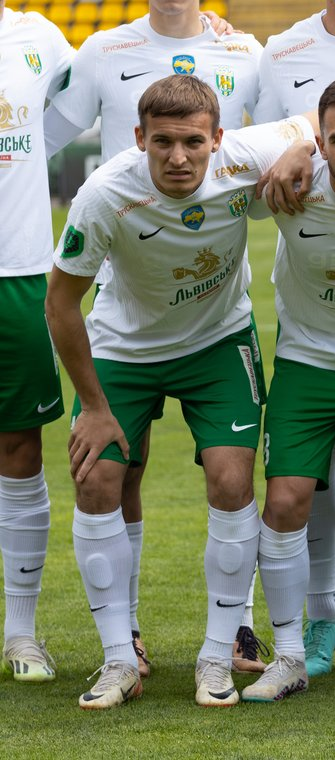

Personal information
- Full name: Yuriy Ivanovych Romanyuk
- Date of birth: 6 May 1997 (age 29)
- Place of birth: Rudka-Kozynska, Volyn Oblast, Ukraine
- Height: 1.76 m (5 ft 9 1/2 in)
- Position: Midfielder

Team information
- Current team: Mayak Sarny

Youth career
- 2011–2014: Volyn Lutsk

Senior career*
Years	Team	Apps	(Gls)
2014–2017	Volyn Lutsk	49	(0)
2018	Chornomorets Odesa	15	(0)
2019	Dnipro-1	9	(0)
2020	Rukh Lviv	0	(0)
2020–2021	Ahrobiznes Volochysk	20	(3)
2021–2023	Metalist Kharkiv	37	(2)
2023–2024	Karpaty Lviv	14	(0)
2025	Prykarpattia Ivano-Frankivsk	7	(0)
2025–2026	Chornomorets Odesa	19	(0)
2026–	Mayak Sarny	0	(0)
- * Club domestic league appearances and goals as of 14 August 2026

Yuriy Ivanovych Romanyuk (Ukrainian: Юрій Іванович Романюк; born 6 May 1997) is a Ukrainian professional footballer who plays as a midfielder.

== Career ==
Romanyuk is a product of the FC Volyn Youth Sportive School System. Then he signed a professional contract with FC Volyn Lutsk in the Ukrainian Premier League.

He made his debut in the Ukrainian Premier League for FC Volyn on 20 March 2016, playing in a match against FC Olimpik Donetsk.

=== Chornomorets Odesa ===
On 8 July 2025, Romanyuk joined Chornomorets Odesa. On 2 August 2025 in the 1st round match of Ukrainian First League between FC Chornomorets and Nyva Ternopil Romanyuk made his official debut as player of Chornomorets. Romanyuk left the team on June 30, 2026.

On 17 July 2026, Romanyuk joined Mayak Sarny.

== Honours ==
Chornomorets Odesa

- Ukrainian First League runner-up: 2025–26
