= Andriy Fedorenko =

Ukrainian footballer (born 1984)

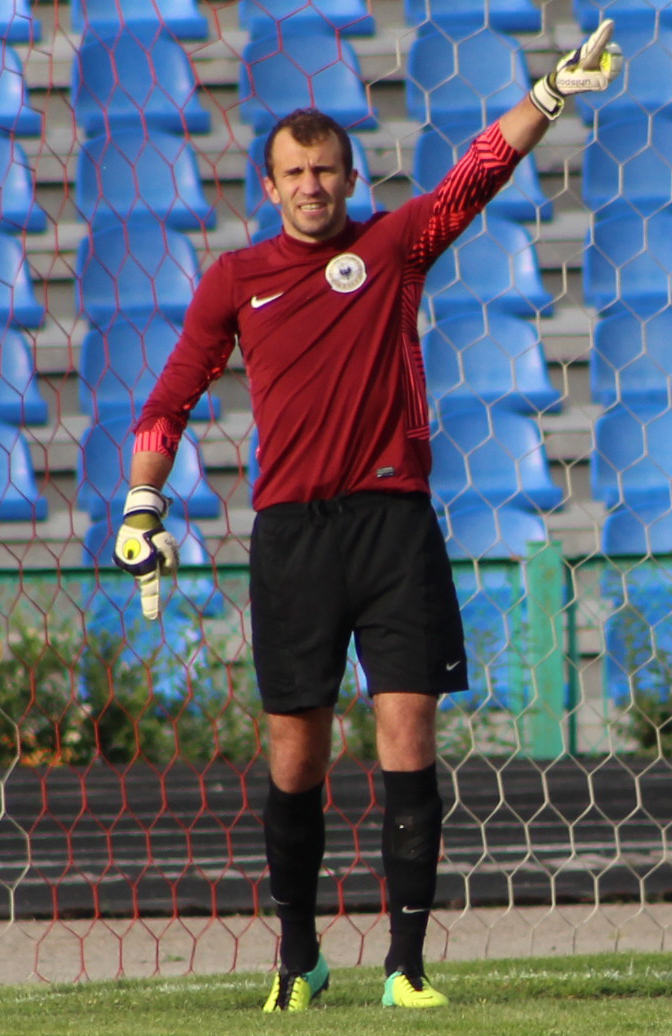

Personal information
- Full name: Andriy Stepanovych Fedorenko
- Date of birth: 9 January 1984 (age 42)
- Place of birth: Chernihiv, Ukrainian SSR, Soviet Union
- Height: 1.92 m (6 ft 4 in)
- Position: Goalkeeper

Youth career
- 2000: Yunist Chernihiv
- 2000–2001: Akademika Moscow

Senior career*
| Years | Team | Apps | (Gls) |
| 2003–2004 | Shinnik Yaroslavl | 0 | (0) |
| 2005 | Stal Dniprodzerzhynsk | 2 | (0) |
| 2006 | Nafkom Brovary | 11 | (0) |
| 2006 | Atyrau | 9 | (0) |
| 2007–2008 | Ceahlăul Piatra Neamț | 5 | (0) |
| 2007 | → Dinamo II București (loan) | 7 | (0) |
| 2008–2009 | Desna Chernihiv | 24 | (0) |
| 2008–2009 | → Desna-2 Chernihiv | 2 | (0) |
| 2009–2013 | Kryvbas Kryvyi Rih | 3 | (0) |
| 2012–2015 | Desna Chernihiv | 57 | (0) |
| 2015 | IF Älgarna | 0 | (0) |
| 2016 | Krumkachy Minsk | 27 | (0) |
| 2017–2018 | Chornomorets Odesa | 0 | (0) |
| 2018 | Umeå | 24 | (0) |
| 2019 | Valmiera | 0 | (0) |
| 2019–2020 | Podillya Khmelnytskyi | 19 | (0) |

Managerial career
- 2020–2022: Kolos Kovalivka (goalkeeper coach U21)
- 2022–2024: Aksu (goalkeeper coach)
- 2024–2025: Podillya (goalkeeper coach)
- 2025–: Dnister Zalishchyky (goalkeeper coach)
- * Club domestic league appearances and goals

Andriy Fedorenko (Ukrainian: Андрій Степанович Федоренко, born 9 January 1984) is a Ukrainian former professional footballer who played as a goalkeeper.

== Career ==
Fedorenko, started his career in youth career in Yunist Chernihiv and in Akademika Moscow. Then he played for the reserve side of FC Shinnik Yaroslavl before joining Ukrainian First League side FC Stal Dniprodzerzhynsk.

== After retirement ==
In 2020 he was appointed as goalkeepers coach of Kolos Kovalivka U21. In 2024 he was appointed as goalkeeping coach of Podillya Khmelnytskyi.

== Outside of professional football ==
In March 2022, during the Siege of Chernihiv, Andriy Fedorenko and others players, provided money for the needs of the Armed Forces to defend the city of Chernihiv.

== Honours ==
Umeå

- Division 1: 2019

Desna Chernihiv

- Ukrainian Second League: 2012–13

Dinamo București II

- Liga III: 2006–07
