= Oleh Trakalo =

Ukrainian footballer

Personal information
- Full name: Oleh Dmytrovych Trakalo
- Date of birth: 14 February 1998 (age 28)
- Place of birth: Tovste, Ukraine
- Height: 1.93 m (6 ft 4 in)
- Position: Defender

Team information
- Current team: Dnister Zalishchyky

Youth career
- 2013–2014: Youth Sportive School Ternopil

Senior career*
Years	Team	Apps	(Gls)
2014	Ternopil	1	(0)
2015	Pogoń Lwów	4	(0)
2015–2017	Volyn Lutsk	6	(0)
2018–2019	Chornomorets Odesa	0	(0)
2022–	Dnister Zalishchyky		
- * Club domestic league appearances and goals as of 2 March 2018

Oleh Dmytrovych Trakalo (Ukrainian: Олег Дмитрович Тракало; born 14 February 1998) is a Ukrainian professional football defender who plays for an amateur side Dnister Zalishchyky.

== Career ==
Trakalo is a product of the Sportive youth school Ternopil. His first trainers were Anatoliy Nazarenko and Vasyl Ivehesh.

He made his debut for FC Volyn Lutsk played as a substituted player in the game against FC Karpaty Lviv on 27 May 2017 in the Ukrainian Premier League.
