= Ivan Bobko =

Ukrainian professional footballer

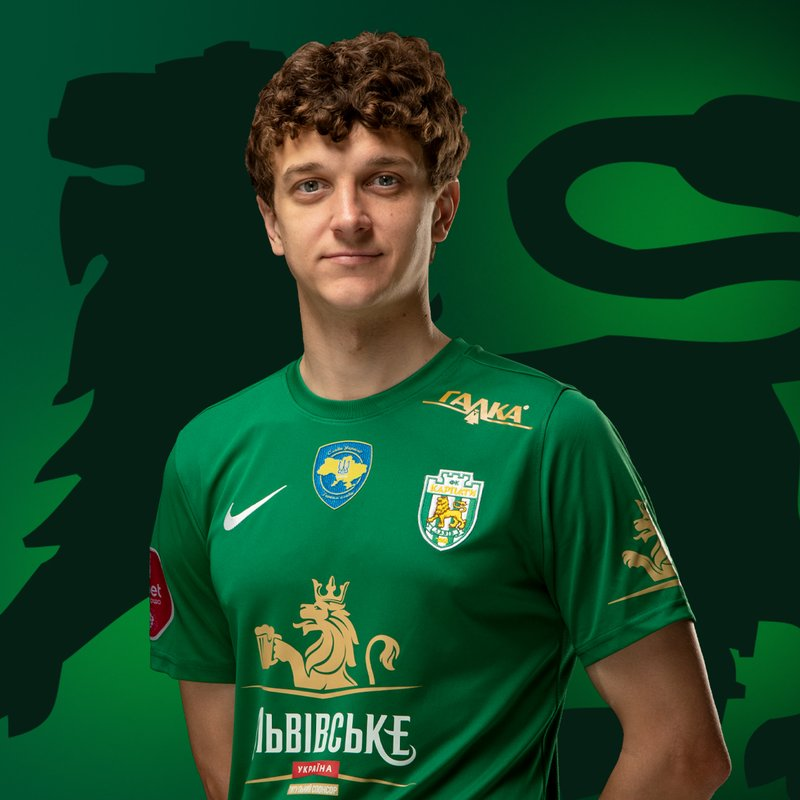

Personal information
- Full name: Ivan Mykhaylovych Bobko
- Date of birth: 10 December 1990 (age 35)
- Place of birth: Odesa, Soviet Union (now Ukraine)
- Height: 1.83 m (6 ft 0 in)
- Position: Left midfielder

Senior career*
Years	Team	Apps	(Gls)
2007–2014	Chornomorets Odesa	82	(8)
2010	→ Chornomorets-2 Odesa	9	(0)
2015–2016	Metalist Kharkiv	24	(0)
2016	Debrecen	10	(1)
2017–2018	Chornomorets Odesa	16	(2)
2019	AFC Eskilstuna	7	(1)
2019	Okzhetpes	11	(0)
2020	Torpedo Kutaisi	10	(2)
2021	Sfântul Gheorghe	0	(0)
2021	LNZ Cherkasy	22	(5)
2022	Chornomorets Odesa	11	(0)
2023–2024	Karpaty Lviv	6	(2)

International career
2009	Ukraine U18	1	(0)
- * Club domestic league appearances and goals

Ivan Mykhaylovych Bobko (Ukrainian: Іван Бобко; born 10 December 1990) is a Ukrainian former professional footballer who played as a left midfielder.

== Career ==
=== Early years ===
Bobko is product of youth team systems of Dyussh 11 Odesa. His first trainer was A. Kucherevskyi.

=== Karpaty Lviv ===
On 5 January 2023 he moved to Karpaty Lviv.

== Career statistics ==
=== Club ===
As of 5 February 2018

Club	Season	League			Cup		Continental		Other		Total	
Club	Season	Division	Apps	Goals	Apps	Goals	Apps	Goals	Apps	Goals	Apps	Goals
Chornomorets Odesa	2007–08	Ukrainian Premier League	0	0	0	0	0	0	0	0	0	0
Chornomorets Odesa	2008–09	Ukrainian Premier League	0	0	0	0	0	0	0	0	0	0
Chornomorets Odesa	2009–10	Ukrainian Premier League	0	0	0	0	0	0	0	0	0	0
Chornomorets Odesa	2010–11	Ukrainian First League	18	4	2	0	0	0	0	0	20	4
Chornomorets Odesa	2011–12	Ukrainian Premier League	7	2	0	0	0	0	0	0	7	2
Chornomorets Odesa	2012–13	Ukrainian Premier League	29	1	3	0	0	0	0	0	32	1
Chornomorets Odesa	2013–14	Ukrainian Premier League	20	0	2	0	12	0	1	0	35	0
Chornomorets Odesa	2014–15	Ukrainian Premier League	8	1	2	0	0	0	0	0	10	1
Chornomorets Odesa	2017–18	Ukrainian Premier League	3	0	0	0	0	0	0	0	3	0
Chornomorets Odesa	Total		85	8	9	0	12	0	1	0	107	8
Chornomorets-2 Odesa	2010–11	Ukrainian Second League	9	0	0	0	0	0	0	0	9	0
Chornomorets-2 Odesa	Total		9	0	0	0	0	0	0	0	9	0
Metalist Kharkiv	2014–15	Ukrainian Premier League	11	0	1	0	0	0	0	0	12	0
Metalist Kharkiv	2015–16	Ukrainian Premier League	13	0	1	0	0	0	0	0	14	0
Metalist Kharkiv	Total		24	0	2	0	0	0	0	0	26	0
Debrecen	2016–17	Nemzeti Bajnokság I	10	1	1	0	0	0	0	0	11	1
Debrecen	Total		10	1	1	0	0	0	0	0	11	1
Career total			128	9	12	0	12	0	1	0	153	9

== Honours ==
LNZ Cherkasy

- Ukrainian Amateur Cup: 2020–21

=== Chornomorets ===
- Ukrainian First League runners-up: 2010–11
- Ukrainian Cup runners-up: 2012–13
- Ukrainian Super Cup runners-up: 2013
