= Vitaliy Kaverin =

Ukrainian footballer

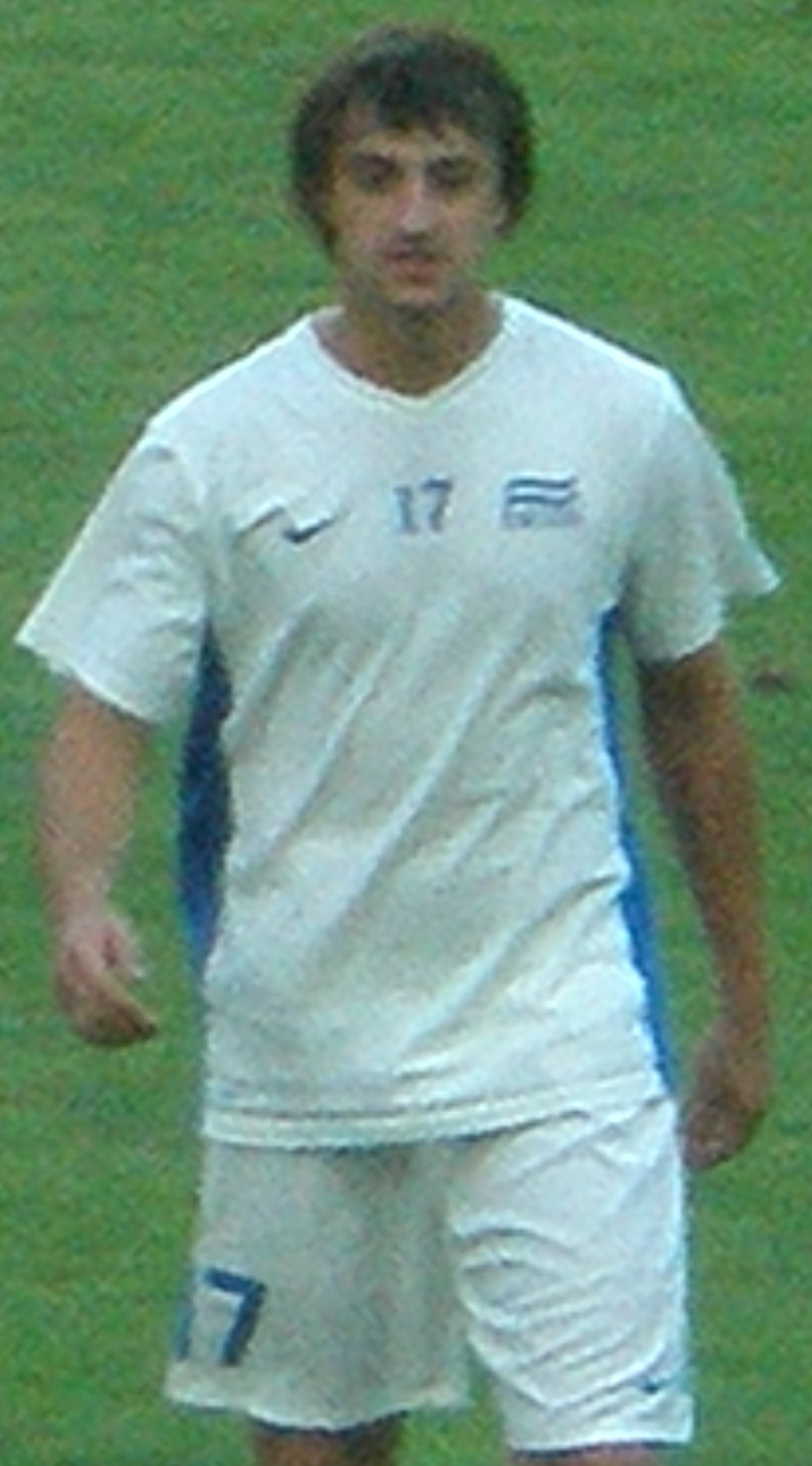

Personal information
- Full name: Vitaliy Viktorovych Kaverin
- Date of birth: 4 September 1990 (age 36)
- Place of birth: Khmelnytskyi, Ukrainian SSR
- Height: 1.82 m (5 ft 11 1/2 in)
- Position: Forward

Team information
- Current team: Podillya Khmelnytskyi
- Number: 49

Youth career
- 2002–2003: Podillya Khmelnytskyi
- 2003: Sportive School#1 Khmelnytskyi
- 2005–2007: Dnipro Dnipropetrovsk

Senior career*
Years	Team	Apps	(Gls)
2007–2012	Dnipro Dnipropetrovsk	6	(0)
2010	→ Kryvbas Kryvyi Rih (loan)	6	(0)
2012–2016	Dynamo Kyiv	0	(0)
2012	→ Metalurh Zaporizhya (loan)	5	(0)
2013–2014	Dynamo-2 Kyiv	23	(1)
2014–2016	→ Hoverla Uzhhorod (loan)	18	(2)
2017	Chornomorets Odesa	10	(0)
2018–2022	Podillya Khmelnytskyi	74	(10)
2023	Łysica Bodzentyn	7	(2)
2023–	Podillya Khmelnytskyi	20	(0)

International career
2007–2009	Ukraine U18	14	(7)
2008–2009	Ukraine U19	11	(1)
2010	Ukraine U20	1	(0)
2010–2012	Ukraine U21	15	(3)
Medal record
Men's football
Representing Ukraine
UEFA European Under-19 Championship
Winner	2009 Ukraine
- * Club domestic league appearances and goals as of 22 June 2024

Vitaliy Viktorovych Kaverin (Ukrainian: Віталій Вікторович Каверін; born 4 September 1990 in Khmelnytskyi, Ukrainian SSR) is a Ukrainian professional footballer who plays as a forward for Podillya Khmelnytskyi.

Kaverin is product of Podillya Khmelnytskyi's youth sportive school. His first trainer was Mykola Shershun. As of July 2023, he made 45 Ukrainian Premier League appearances in his career so far.

== Honours ==
Ukraine U19

- UEFA European Under-19 Championship: 2009
