= 2017–18 FC Stal Kamianske season =

Stal Kamianske
2017-18 season
- President: Vardan Israelian
- Manager: Yegishe Melikyan (until 25 September 2017); Nikolay Kostov (since 28 September 2017)
- Stadium: Meteor Stadium, Dnipro (Round 3); Obolon Arena, Kyiv (since Round 5)
- Ukrainian Premier League: 12th (relegated)
- Ukrainian Cup: Round of 16 (1/8)
- Top goalscorer: League: Orest Kuzyk (8); All: Orest Kuzyk (8)
Home colours	Away colours

The 2017–18 season was 3rd consecutive season in the top Ukrainian football league and the last season for Stal Kamianske. Stal competed in Premier League and Ukrainian Cup. After finishing at 12th position Stal was relegated to First League at the end of the season. The team officially relocated to Bucha, Kyiv Oblast and renamed to Feniks in the 2018–19 midseason. However before the start of next season new club withdrew from 2018–19 Ukrainian First League due to financial difficulties.

== Players ==
=== Squad information ===
As of 31 May 2018

Squad no.	Name	Nationality	Position	Date of birth (age)
Goalkeepers
1	Danylo Ryabenko ^{List B}	(Ukraine)	GK	9 October 1998 (aged 19)
25	Ivan Siletskyi	(Ukraine)	GK	22 January 1996 (aged 22)
71	Herman Penkov	(Ukraine)	GK	26 May 1994 (aged 24)
77	Mykyta Zelenskyi ^{List B}	(Ukraine)	GK	26 May 1998 (aged 20)
Defenders
2	Jonathan	(Brazil)	DF	4 April 1995 (aged 23)
4	Bohdan Mytsyk ^{List B}	(Ukraine)	DF	8 March 1998 (aged 20)
20	Anatoliy Ulyanov ^{List B}	(Ukraine)	DF	26 July 1998 (aged 19)
22	Artur Danielyan ^{List B}	(Armenia) (Ukraine)	DF	2 September 1998 (aged 19)
66	Ebert	(Brazil)	DF	25 May 1993 (aged 25)
87	Bohdan Rudyuk	(Ukraine)	DF	19 April 1994 (aged 24)
88	Ihor Oshchypko	(Ukraine)	DF	25 October 1985 (aged 32)
Midfielders
3	Gor Malakyan	(Armenia)	MF	12 June 1994 (aged 23)
7	Danylo Knysh ^{List B}	(Ukraine)	MF	3 March 1996 (aged 22)
8	Maryan Mysyk ^{List B}	(Ukraine)	MF	2 October 1996 (aged 21)
10	Kyrylo Kostenko ^{List B}	(Ukraine)	MF	4 December 1998 (aged 19)
11	Yuriy Klymchuk ^{List B}	(Ukraine)	MF	5 May 1997 (aged 21)
13	Dmytro Kopytov ^{List B}	(Ukraine)	MF	29 May 1998 (aged 20)
15	Hlib Hrachov ^{List B}	(Ukraine)	MF	15 May 1997 (aged 21)
17	Orest Kuzyk	(Ukraine)	MF	17 May 1995 (aged 23)
23	Mykhaylo Meskhi ^{List B}	(Ukraine)	MF	26 February 1997 (aged 21)
55	Anton Antoshyn ^{List B}	(Ukraine)	MF	21 May 1998 (aged 20)
92	Thiago Rômulo	(Brazil)	MF	11 June 1992 (aged 25)
94	Maksym Zaderaka	(Ukraine)	MF	7 September 1994 (aged 23)
97	Andriy Yakymiv ^{List B}	(Ukraine)	MF	15 June 1997 (aged 20)
Forwards
16	Artem Khotsyanovskyi ^{List B}	(Ukraine)	FW	20 October 1998 (aged 19)
74	Ihor Nekhayev ^{List B}	(Ukraine)	FW	20 December 1999 (aged 18)
96	Anatoliy Nuriyev ^{List B}	(Ukraine)	FW	20 May 1996 (aged 22)
98	Vladyslav Andrusenko ^{List B}	(Ukraine)	FW	22 July 1998 (aged 19)
99	Vladyslav Vakula ^{List B}	(Ukraine)	FW	29 April 1999 (aged 19)

== Transfers ==
=== In ===
Date	Pos.	Player	Age	Moving from	Type	Fee	Source
Summer
30 August 2017	MF	(Serbia) Nemanja Obradović	28	(Serbia) Čukarički	Transfer	Undisclosed	
14 September 2017	DF	(Ukraine) Yevhen Tkachuk	26	(Kazakhstan) Irtysh Pavlodar	Transfer	Free	
1 July 2017	MF	(Ukraine) Oleksandr Kozak	22	(Ukraine) FC Mariupol	Loan return		
11 July 2017	FW	(Ukraine) Oleksiy Schebetun	20	(Ukraine) Dynamo Kyiv	Loan		
12 July 2017	MF	(Ukraine) Bohdan Mykhaylychenko	20	(Ukraine) Dynamo Kyiv	Loan		
18 July 2017	DF	(Ukraine) Oleksandr Tymchyk	20	(Ukraine) Dynamo Kyiv	Loan		
Winter
11 January 2018	DF	(Ukraine) Ihor Oshchypko	32	(Ukraine) FC Lviv	Transfer	Free	
20 January 2018	DF	(Brazil) Ebert	24	(Brazil) Itumbiara	Transfer	Free	
20 January 2018	MF	(Brazil) Thiago Rômulo	25	(Brazil) Anapolina	Transfer	Undisclosed	
23 January 2018	MF	(Ukraine) Bohdan Rudyuk	23	(Belarus) Krumkachy Minsk	Transfer	Free	
13 February 2018	DF	(Brazil) Jonathan	22	(Brazil) Goiás B	Transfer	Free	
14 February 2018	FW	(Ukraine) Anatoliy Nuriyev	21	(Ukraine) Munkach Mukachevo	Transfer	Free	
30 March 2018	GK	(Ukraine) Ivan Siletskyi	22	(Ukraine) Karpaty Lviv	Transfer	Free	

=== Out ===
Date	Pos.	Player	Age	Moving to	Type	Fee	Source
Summer
31 May 2017	DF	(Brazil) Leandro da Silva	32	Unattached	Transfer	Free	
31 May 2017	DF	(Ukraine) Serhiy Voronin	30	Unattached	Transfer	Free	
19 June 2017	FW	(Ghana) Kwame Karikari	25	(Qatar) Al-Markhiya	Transfer	Undisclosed	
23 June 2017	GK	(Ukraine) Yuriy Pankiv	32	(Ukraine) FC Oleksandriya	Transfer	Free	
23 June 2017	MF	(Ukraine) Maksym Kalenchuk	27	(Ukraine) FC Oleksandriya	Transfer	Free	
26 June 2017	DF	(Serbia) Miloš Stamenković	27	(Kazakhstan) Irtysh Pavlodar	Transfer	Undisclosed	
28 June 2017	FW	(Ukraine) Roman Debelko	23	(Ukraine) Karpaty Lviv	Transfer	Free	
1 July 2017	GK	(Ukraine) Oleksandr Bandura	31	(Ukraine) Veres Rivne	Transfer	Free	
1 July 2017	MF	(Ukraine) Roman Karasyuk	26	(Ukraine) Veres Rivne	Transfer	Free	
3 July 2017	DF	(Ukraine) Mykola Ischenko	34	(Ukraine) Veres Rivne	Transfer	Free	
13 July 2017	DF	(Ukraine) Anton Kravchenko	26	(Ukraine) Olimpik Donetsk	Transfer	Free	
13 July 2017	DF	(Ukraine) Artem Shabanov	25	(Ukraine) Olimpik Donetsk	Transfer	Free	
17 July 2017	DF	(Azerbaijan) Pavlo Pashayev	29	(Ukraine) FC Oleksandriya	Transfer	Free	
4 August 2017	FW	(Curaçao) Boy Deul	29	(Cyprus) Pafos FC	Transfer	Free	
11 August 2017	FW	(Ukraine) Denys Vasin	28	(Ukraine) Chornomorets Odesa	Transfer	Free	
5 September 2017	MF	(Ukraine) Oleksiy Dovhyi	27	(Ukraine) FC Oleksandriya	Transfer	Free	
Winter
24 January 2018	FW	(Serbia) Nemanja Obradović	28	(Finland) Honka	Transfer	Free	
26 January 2018	DF	(Ukraine) Yevhen Tkachuk	26	(Kazakhstan) Shakhter Karagandy	Transfer	Undisclosed	
26 January 2018	MF	(Armenia) Edgar Malakyan	27	(Kazakhstan) Zhetysu	Transfer	Undisclosed	
1 January 2018	DF	(Ukraine) Oleksandr Tymchyk	20	(Ukraine) Dynamo Kyiv	Loan return		
1 January 2018	MF	(Ukraine) Bohdan Mykhaylychenko	20	(Ukraine) Dynamo Kyiv	Loan return		
1 January 2018	FW	(Ukraine) Oleksiy Schebetun	20	(Ukraine) Dynamo Kyiv	Loan return		

== Pre-season and friendlies ==
6 July 2017 Friendly	Kolos Kovalivka (Ukraine)	2–0	(Ukraine) Stal Kamianske	Mala Soltanivka
: EEST (UTC+03:00)	Ryabov; Yarovenko	Report

12 July 2017 Friendly	Stal Kamianske (Ukraine)	3–0	(Iran) Persepolis	Koncha-Zaspa
EEST (UTC+03:00)	Kuzyk, Schebetun	Report

20 January 2018 Friendly	Stal Kamianske (Ukraine)	0–0	(Romania) Juventus București	Lara, Antalya, Turkey
16:30 EET (UTC+02:00)		Report		Stadium: Topkapi Football Center; Attendance: 30

27 January 2018 Friendly	Stal Kamianske (Ukraine)	0–0	(North Macedonia) Shkupi	Belek, Turkey
16:30 EET (UTC+02:00)		Report		Stadium: IC Hotels Santai

2 February 2018 Friendly	Stal Kamianske (Ukraine)	1–2	(Hungary) Mezőkövesdi SE	Lara, Antalya, Turkey
EET (UTC+02:00)	Mysyk 71'	Report	Novák 33'; Cseri 61'	Stadium: Topkapi Football Center

6 February 2018 Friendly	Stal Kamianske (Ukraine)	3–3	(Georgia (country)) Saburtalo Tbilisi	Antalya, Turkey
EET (UTC+02:00)	Thiago Rômulo 23'; Zaderaka 25'; Klymchuk 90+1'	Report	Kokhreidze 10', 85'; Lakvekheliani 77'	Stadium: Emirhan sports center Attendance: 30

10 February 2018 Friendly	Stal Kamianske (Ukraine)	1–1	(Armenia) Banants Yerevan	Belek, Turkey
17:00 EET (UTC+02:00)	70'	Report	Krasić 26'	Stadium: Limak Arcadia Atlantis Football Center; Attendance: 40

24 March 2018 Friendly	Shakhtar Donetsk U-21 (Ukraine)	2–2	(Ukraine) Stal Kamianske	Shchaslyve
13:00 EET (UTC+02:00)	Yalovenko 41'; Hloba 63' (pen.)	Report	Thiago Rômulo 31' (pen.); Knysh 89' (pen.)	Stadium: Knyazha Arena; Attendance: 30; Referee: Serhiy Boyko

== Competitions ==
=== Overall ===
Competition	First match	Last match	Starting round	Final position	Record							
Competition	First match	Last match	Starting round	Final position	Pld	W	D	L	GF	GA	GD	Win %
Premier League	16 July 2017	19 May 2018	Matchday 1	12th	32	6	8	18	23	44	−21	18.75
Cup	20 September 2017	25 October 2017	Round 3 (1/16)	Round of 16 (1/8)	2	0	2	0	2	2	+0	0.00
Total					34	6	10	18	25	46	−21	17.65

Last updated: 19 May 2018
Source: Competitions

=== Premier League ===
==== League table ====
Pos	Team	Pld	W	D	L	GF	GA	GD	Pts	Qualification or relegation
8	Karpaty Lviv	32	8	13	11	28	45	−17	37	
9	Olimpik Donetsk	32	9	9	14	29	38	−9	36	
10	Zirka Kropyvnytskyi (R)	32	7	10	15	22	40	−18	31	Qualification for the Relegation play-offs
11	Chornomorets Odesa (Z)	32	6	11	15	26	49	−23	29	Qualification for the Relegation play-offs
12	Stal Kamianske (R, X)	32	6	8	18	23	44	−21	26	Relegated and later withdrawn

Source: Ukrainian Premier League (in Ukrainian), UEFA, Soccerway
Rules for classification: 1) Points; 2) Goal difference; 3) Goals scored; 4) Head-to-head points; 5) Head-to-head goal difference; 6) Head-to-head goals scored; 7) Draw.
(R) Relegated; (X) Withdrew; (Z) Readmitted in after withdrawal of FC Poltava. see 2017–18 Ukrainian Premier League #Relegation play-offs for more information.

Team 1	Agg.	Team 2	1st leg	2nd leg
Zirka Kropyvnytskyi	1–5	Desna Chernihiv	1–1	0–4
Chornomorets Odesa	1–3	FC Poltava	1–0	0–3 (a.e.t.)

==== Results summary ====
Overall								Home						Away					
Pld	W	D	L	GF	GA	GD	Pts	W	D	L	GF	GA	GD	W	D	L	GF	GA	GD
32	6	8	18	23	44	−21	26	1	5	10	8	17	−9	5	3	8	15	27	−12

Last updated: 19 May 2018.
Source: Competitive matches

==== Results by round ====
Round	1	2	3	4	5	6	7	8	9	10	11	12	13	14	15	16	17	18	19	20	21	22	23	24	25	26	27	28	29	30	31	32
Ground	A	A	H	A	H	A	H	H	A	H	A	H	H	A	H	A	H	A	A	H	A	H	A	A	H	A	H	H	H	A	H	A
Result	W	W	L	L	L	L	L	L	L	D	D	L	D	D	D	D	L	L	L	W	L	L	W	W	D	L	L	D	L	W	L	L
Position	4	2	3	6	7	7	9	9	11	11	10	12	12	12	12	12	12	12	12	12	12	12	12	10	11	11	11	11	12	11	11	12

Updated to match(es) played on 19 May 2018. Source: Competitive matches
A = Away; H = Home; W = Win; D = Draw; L = Loss

==== Matches ====
16 July 2017 1	Zorya Luhansk	0–1	Stal Kamianske	Zaporizhia
19:30 EEST (UTC+03:00)	Kharatin (yellow card) 59'	Report	Danielyan (yellow card) 29'; Mykhaylychenko (yellow card) 44'; Yakymiv 60'; Mytsyk (yellow card) 83'; Penkov (yellow card) 90+3'	Stadium: Slavutych-Arena; Attendance: 1,500; Referee: Sehiy Boyko

22 July 2017 2	Chornomorets Odesa	0–1	Stal Kamianske	Odesa
17:00 EEST (UTC+03:00)	Musolitin (yellow card) 16'; Politylo (yellow card) 20'; Kovalets (yellow card) 58'; Antonov (yellow card) 87'	Report	Danielyan (yellow card) 66'; Penkov (yellow card) 68'; Kuzyk 74'; Gor Malakyan (yellow card) 81'; Yakymiv (yellow card) 85'	Stadium: Chornomorets Stadium; Attendance: 4,765; Referee: Serhiy Berezka

29 July 2017 3	Stal Kamianske	1–2	Shakhtar Donetsk	Dnipro
17:00 EEST (UTC+03:00)	Kuzyk 9'; Tymchyk (yellow card) 90+3'; Knysh (yellow card) 90+5'; Danielyan (yellow card) 90+6' (yellow-red card) 90+7'	Report	Taison 45', (yellow card) 52'; Rakitskiy (yellow card) 53'; Stepanenko (yellow card) 82'; Kryvtsov (yellow card) 86'; Fred (yellow card) 90'; Dentinho (yellow card) 90+2'; Blanco Leschuk 90+5'; Marlos (yellow card) 90+6'	Stadium: Meteor Stadium; Attendance: 3,500; Referee: Ivan Bondar

5 August 2017 4	Karpaty Lviv	3–1	Stal Kamianske	Lviv
17:00 EEST (UTC+03:00)	Pidkivka (yellow card) 7'; Miroshnichenko (yellow card) 21'; Khudobyak (yellow card) 25', (goal) 30'; Fedetskyi (yellow card) 45'; Holodyuk (yellow card) 57' (yellow-red card) 73', (goal) 64'; Chachua (yellow card) 62'; Debelko 91' (pen.)	Report	Edgar Malakyan 8' (pen.); Gor Malakyan (yellow card) 63'; Yakymiv (yellow card) 68'; Mykhaylychenko (yellow card) 86'; Khotsyanovskyi (yellow card) 87'	Stadium: Ukraina Stadium; Attendance: 4,372; Referee: Viktor Kopiyevskyi

12 August 2017 5	Stal Kamianske	0–1	Vorskla Poltava	Kyiv
17:00 EEST (UTC+03:00)	Yakymiv (yellow card) 90'	Report	Sharpar (yellow card) 35'; Kravchenko (yellow card) 62'; Dallku 90+1'	Stadium: Obolon Arena; Attendance: 1,250; Referee: Oleksandr Derdo

20 August 2017 6	Dynamo Kyiv	4–1	Stal Kamianske	Kyiv
19:30 EEST (UTC+03:00)	Besyedin 7'; Kravets 26', 65'; Vida 40'	Report	Mysyk (yellow card) 42'; Kuzyk 54'; Gor Malakyan (yellow card) 55'	Stadium: NSC Olimpiyskiy; Attendance: 6,911; Referee: Kateryna Monzul

26 August 2017 7	Stal Kamianske	0–1	Zirka Kropyvnytskyi	Kyiv
17:00 EEST (UTC+03:00)	Gor Malakyan (yellow card) 73'; Danielyan (yellow card) 73'; Klymchuk (yellow card) 73'; Penkov (yellow card) 84'	Report	Pryadun 36'; Kovalyov (yellow card) 45+2'; Drachenko (yellow card) 73'	Stadium: Obolon Arena; Attendance: 525; Referee: Mykola Balakin

10 September 2017 8	Stal Kamianske	0–1	FC Mariupol	Kyiv
17:00 EEST (UTC+03:00)	Mykhaylychenko (yellow card) 40'; Mysyk (yellow card) 90+2'	Report	Vakulenko 41' (pen.); Khudzhamov (yellow card) 79'; Rudyka (yellow card) 82'; Fomin (yellow card) 85'; Nasonov (yellow card) 85'	Stadium: Obolon Arena; Attendance: 503; Referee: Anatoliy Abdula

16 September 2017 9	FC Oleksandriya	4–1	Stal Kamianske	Oleksandriya
14:00 EEST (UTC+03:00)	Mykhaylychenko 14' (o.g.); Starenkyi 31', 38', 51', (yellow card) 78'	Report	Mykhaylychenko (yellow card) 9'; Obradović 18'; Klymchuk (yellow card) 84'; Knysh (yellow card) 86'	Stadium: CSC Nika Stadium; Attendance: 1,150; Referee: Serhiy Berezka

24 September 2017 10	Stal Kamianske	1–1	Olimpik Donetsk	Kyiv
14:00 EEST (UTC+03:00)	Meskhi 24', (yellow card) 79'; Yakymiv (yellow card) 45'; Khotsyanovskyi (yellow card) 86'; Tymchyk (yellow card) 90+1'	Report	Brikner (yellow card) 40'; Bilenkyi 60'; Ochigava (yellow card) 63'	Stadium: Obolon Arena; Attendance: 346; Referee: Serhiy Boyko

1 October 2017 11	Veres Rivne	1–1	Stal Kamianske	Lviv
17:00 EEST (UTC+03:00)	Fedorchuk (yellow card) 56'; Karasyuk (yellow card) 87'; Adamyuk 88'	Report	Mysyk (yellow card) 31'; Kuzyk 42'; Hrachov (yellow card) 54'; Klymchuk (yellow card) 63'; Edgar Malakyan (yellow card) 75'	Stadium: Arena Lviv; Attendance: 780; Referee: Dmytro Kutakov

14 October 2017 12	Stal Kamianske	0–1	Zorya Luhansk	Kyiv
17:00 EEST (UTC+03:00)	Gor Malakyan (yellow card) 22'; Edgar Malakyan (yellow card) 46'	Report	Pryima 57'; Hordiyenko (yellow card) 59'	Stadium: Obolon Arena; Attendance: 570; Referee: Viktor Kopiyevskyi

22 October 2017 13	Stal Kamianske	1–1	Chornomorets Odesa	Kyiv
14:00 EEST (UTC+03:00)	Edgar Malakyan (yellow card) 29', (goal) 62'; Mysyk (yellow card) 69'; Hrachov (yellow card) 77'	Report	Bamba (yellow card) 28'; Vasin (yellow card) 29', (goal) 52'; Hutar (yellow card) 31'; Orikhovskyi (yellow card) 38'; Lyulka (yellow card) 90'	Stadium: Obolon Arena; Attendance: 260; Referee: Ihor Paskhal

28 October 2017 14	Shakhtar Donetsk	1–1	Stal Kamianske	Kharkiv
17:00 EEST (UTC+03:00)	Ferreyra 14', (yellow card) 51'; Khocholava (yellow card) 69'; Ordets (yellow card) 86'	Report	Danielyan (yellow card) 51'; Meskhi (yellow card) 57'; Tymchyk (yellow card) 57'; Obradović 64'	Stadium: Metalist OSC; Attendance: 2,741; Referee: Serhiy Boyko

5 November 2017 15	Stal Kamianske	0–0	Karpaty Lviv	Kyiv
17:00 EET (UTC+03:00)	Mysyk (yellow card) 55'; Tymchyk (yellow card) 69'; Edgar Malakyan (yellow card) 90+2'	Report	Fedetskyi (yellow card) 30'; Carrascal (yellow card) 57'; Khudobyak (yellow card) 64'	Stadium: Obolon Arena; Attendance: 500; Referee: Volodymyr Novokhatniy

19 November 2017 16	Vorskla Poltava	1–1	Stal Kamianske	Poltava
14:00 EET (UTC+03:00)	Chyzhov (yellow card) 27'; Kobakhidze 56'; Sklyar (yellow card) 80'	Report	Danielyan (yellow card) 45'; Khotsyanovskyi 72'; Kopytov (yellow card) 90+3'	Stadium: Vorskla Stadium; Attendance: 650; Referee: Serhiy Berezka

26 November 2017 17	Stal Kamianske	0–2	Dynamo Kyiv	Kyiv
19:30 EET (UTC+03:00)	Yakymiv (yellow card) 49'; Klymchuk (yellow card) 70'	Report	Mbokani 13'; Shepelyev (yellow card) 45+2'; Khacheridi (yellow card) 49'; Morozyuk 51'; Mykolenko (yellow card) 72'; Tsyhankov (yellow card) 87'	Stadium: Obolon Arena; Attendance: 2,700; Referee: Viktor Kopiyevskyi

3 December 2017 18	Zirka Kropyvnytskyi	1–0	Stal Kamianske	Kropyvnytskyi
14:00 EET (UTC+03:00)	Guedj (yellow card) 28' (yellow-red card) 31'; Polehenko (yellow card) 36'; Kacharaba (yellow card) 60'; Zahalskyi (yellow card) 67'; Tsyupa 78'; Dryshlyuk (yellow card) 90+2'; Past (yellow card) 90+4'	Report	Ulyanov (yellow card) 36' (yellow-red card) 76'; Mykhaylychenko (yellow card) 67'; Edgar Malakyan (yellow card) 67'; Tymchyk (yellow card) 82'; Khotsyanovskyi (yellow card) 89'; Danielyan (yellow card) 89'	Stadium: Zirka Stadium; Attendance: 954; Referee: Volodymyr Novokhatniy

9 December 2017 19	FC Mariupol	4–2	Stal Kamianske	Mariupol
14:00 EET (UTC+03:00)	Tankovskyi (yellow card) 23'; Fomin 34', 67', (yellow card) 88'; Gomis (yellow card) 52'; Totovytskyi 78'; Bolbat 82'; Tyschenko (yellow card) 86'	Report	Edgar Malakyan 26', 87'; Meskhi (yellow card) 39'	Stadium: Volodymyr Boiko Stadium; Attendance: 3,140; Referee: Oleksandr Derdo

17 February 2018 20	Stal Kamianske	2–0	FC Oleksandriya	Kyiv
14:00 EET (UTC+03:00)	Zaderaka (yellow card) 16'; Meskhi (yellow card) 55'; Kopytov 71'; Klymchuk 76'	Report	Bukhal 17'; Babohlo (yellow card) 60'; Batsula (yellow card) 84'	Stadium: Obolon Arena; Attendance: 512; Referee: Ievgenii Aranovskyi

25 February 2018 21	Olimpik Donetsk	2–0	Stal Kamianske	Kyiv
14:00 EET (UTC+02:00)	Illoy-Ayyet (yellow card) 12'; Tsymbalyuk (yellow card) 53'; Hennadiy Pasich (yellow card) 56'; Kisil 67', (yellow card) 77'; Bilenkyi 75' (pen.)	Report	Johnathan (yellow card) 58'; Yakymiv (yellow card) 80'; Oshchypko (yellow card) 88'	Stadium: Dynamo Stadium; Attendance: 84; Referee: Dmytro Bondarenko

4 March 2018 22	Stal Kamianske	0–1	Veres Rivne	Kyiv
14:00 EET (UTC+02:00)	Danielyan (yellow card) 56'	Report	Kulish 30'; Kalenchuk (yellow card) 56'; Lukyanchuk (yellow card) 89'	Stadium: Obolon Arena; Attendance: 250; Referee: Yaroslav Kozyk

10 March 2018 23	Zirka Kropyvnytskyi	1–2	Stal Kamianske	Kropyvnytskyi
14:00 EET (UTC+02:00)	Guedj (yellow card) 24'; Tsyupa 53'; Zahalskyi (yellow card) 90+2'; Bratkov (yellow card) 90+2'	Report	Meskhi (yellow card) 34'; Kuzyk 37'; Yakymiv (yellow card) 38'; Johnathan 45', (yellow card) 52'; Hrachov (yellow card) 90+2'	Stadium: Zirka Stadium; Attendance: 1,018; Referee: Ivan Bondar

17 March 2018 24	Chornomorets Odesa	0–1	Stal Kamianske	Odesa
14:00 EET (UTC+02:00)	Smirnov (yellow card) 90'	Report	Kuzyk 18'; Thiago Rômulo (yellow card) 77'; Mysyk (yellow card) 90+4'	Stadium: Chornomorets Stadium; Attendance: 3,945; Referee: Mykola Kryvonosov

1 April 2018 25	Stal Kamianske	0–0	Olimpik Donetsk	Kyiv
19:30 EEST (UTC+03:00)	Hrachov (yellow card) 9'; Meskhi (yellow card) 17'; Mysyk (yellow card) 90+2'	Report	Vakulenko (yellow card) 19'; Vuković (yellow card) 28'; Yevhen Pasich (yellow card) 45+1'; Hennadiy Pasich (yellow card) 66'	Stadium: Obolon Arena; Attendance: 280; Referee: Yevhen Aranovskyi

7 April 2018 26	FC Oleksandriya	2–0	Stal Kamianske	Oleksandriya
17:00 EEST (UTC+03:00)	Protasov 14'; Dovhyi (yellow card) 28'; Hrytsuk 36' (pen.); Bondarenko (yellow card) 80'	Report	Danielyan (yellow card) 36'; Ebert (yellow card) 51'	Stadium: CSC Nika Stadium; Attendance: 1,188; Referee: Maksym Kozyryatskyi

15 April 2018 27	Stal Kamianske	0–1	Karpaty Lviv	Kyiv
19:30 EEST (UTC+03:00)	Hrachov (yellow card) 29' (yellow-red card) 75'; Ebert (yellow card) 45'; Mysyk (yellow card) 51'; Kopytov (yellow card) 53'	Report	Carrascal 34'; Di Franco (yellow card) 66'; Shevchenko (yellow card) 90'	Stadium: Obolon Arena; Attendance: 450; Referee: Mykola Kryvonosov

21 April 2018 28	Stal Kamianske	1–1	Zirka Kropyvnytskyi	Kyiv
14:00 EEST (UTC+03:00)	Kuzyk 57' (pen.); Johnathan (yellow card) 63'; Kostenko (yellow card) 79'	Report	Gafaiti (yellow card) 21'; Tsyupa (yellow card) 44' (yellow-red card) 54'; Petrov (yellow card) 47', (goal) 50'	Stadium: Obolon Arena; Attendance: 217; Referee: Ievgenii Aranovskyi

28 April 2018 29	Stal Kamianske	1–2	Chornomorets Odesa	Kyiv
17:00 EEST (UTC+03:00)	Meskhi (yellow card) 1'; Klymchuk 22'	Report	Tretyakov 25'; Kovalets (yellow card) 58'; Bobko 65'	Stadium: Obolon Arena; Attendance: 340; Referee: Serhiy Boyko

6 May 2018 30	Olimpik Donetsk	0–2	Stal Kamianske	Kyiv
14:00 EEST (UTC+03:00)	Vakulenko (yellow card) 12'; Kulynych (yellow card) 29'; Sondey (yellow card) 48'; Doronin (yellow card) 57' (red card) 59'	Report	Gor Malakyan (yellow card) 43'; Kuzyk 79'; Yakymiv (yellow card) 85'; Kopytov 90+1'	Stadium: Dynamo Stadium; Attendance: 435; Referee: Ihor Paskhal

12 May 2018 31	Stal Kamianske	1–2	FC Oleksandriya	Kyiv
17:00 EEST (UTC+03:00)	Gor Malakyan (yellow card) 67'; Khotsyanovskyi (yellow card) 71'; Mysyk 90+1' (pen.)	Report	Banada (yellow card) 26'; Batsula 76'; Tsurikov 78'; Shendrik (yellow card) 85'; Chebotayev (yellow card) 89'	Stadium: Obolon Arena; Attendance: 450; Referee: Anatoliy Abdula

19 May 2018 32	Karpaty Lviv	3–0	Stal Kamianske	Lviv
17:00 EEST (UTC+03:00)	Lebedenko 37'; Hutsulyak (yellow card) 44'; Di Franco (yellow card) 52'; Myakushko 61'; Shved 78'; Klyots (yellow card) 90+1'	Report	Oshchypko (yellow card) 3'; Klymchuk (yellow card) 81'; Johnathan (yellow card) 84' (yellow-red card) 89'	Stadium: Ukraina Stadium; Attendance: 2,121; Referee: Volodymyr Novokhatniy

=== Ukrainian Cup ===
20 September 2017 Round 3 (1/16)	Zhemchuzhyna Odesa	1–1 (1 – 4 p)	Stal Kamianske	Odesa
16:00 EEST (UTC+03:00)	Dolynskyi 44', (yellow card) 62'; Norenkov (yellow card) 77'; Petko (yellow card) 87'; Murashov (yellow card) 88'; Demenchuk (yellow card) 103' (yellow-red card) 109'	[ Report]	Hrachov (yellow card) 36'; Tkachuk (yellow card) 54' (yellow-red card) 109'; Mysyk 65'; Meskhi (yellow card) 89'; Kuzyk (yellow card) 99'; Penkov (yellow card) 103'	Stadium: Spartak Stadium; Referee: Oleksandr Pavliuk
	Penalties
	Pospelov (penalty missed); Petko (penalty scored); Murashov (penalty missed)		Mysyk (penalty scored); Mykhaylychenko (penalty scored); Obradović (penalty scored); Edgar Malakyan (penalty scored)

25 October 2017 Round of 16 (1/8)	FC Lviv	1–1 (5 – 3 p)	Stal Kamianske	Lviv
19:00 EEST (UTC+03:00)	Koblyuk (yellow card) 59'; Kyslenko 69'; Zaychuk (yellow card) 98'	Report	Klymchuk 11'; Mysyk (yellow card) 110'; Yakymiv (yellow card) 120+1'	Stadium: Skif Stadium; Referee: Volodymyr Novohatniyi
	Penalties
	Bukhal (penalty scored); Orlovskyi (penalty scored); Zaychuk (penalty scored); Koblyuk (penalty scored); Oshchypko (penalty scored)		Mysyk (penalty scored); Mykhaylychenko (penalty missed); Obradović (penalty scored); Yakymiv (penalty scored)

== Statistics ==
=== Appearances and goals ===
No.	Pos	Nat	Player	Total		Premier League		Cup	
No.	Pos	Nat	Player	Apps	Goals	Apps	Goals	Apps	Goals
Goalkeepers
71	GK	(Ukraine) UKR	Herman Penkov	34	0	32	0	2	0
Defenders
2	DF	(Brazil) BRA	Jonathan	13	1	13	1	0	0
4	DF	(Ukraine) UKR	Bohdan Mytsyk	5	0	4+1	0	0	0
20	DF	(Ukraine) UKR	Anatoliy Ulyanov	2	0	2	0	0	0
22	DF	(Armenia) ARM	Artur Danielyan	21	0	18+1	0	2	0
66	DF	(Brazil) BRA	Ebert	10	0	10	0	0	0
88	DF	(Ukraine) UKR	Ihor Oshchypko	12	0	12	0	0	0
95	DF	(Ukraine) UKR	Mykola Pavliuk	1	0	1	0	0	0
Midfielders
3	MF	(Armenia) ARM	Gor Malakyan	18	0	15+3	0	0	0
7	MF	(Ukraine) UKR	Danylo Knysh	16	0	4+11	0	1	0
8	MF	(Ukraine) UKR	Maryan Mysyk	31	2	26+3	1	1+1	1
10	MF	(Ukraine) UKR	Kyrylo Kostenko	9	0	2+7	0	0	0
11	MF	(Ukraine) UKR	Yuriy Klymchuk	26	3	19+6	2	1	1
13	MF	(Ukraine) UKR	Dmytro Kopytov	20	2	5+14	2	0+1	0
15	MF	(Ukraine) UKR	Hlib Hrachov	27	0	25	0	2	0
17	MF	(Ukraine) UKR	Orest Kuzyk	34	8	31+1	8	2	0
23	MF	(Ukraine) UKR	Mykhaylo Meskhi	30	1	26+2	1	2	0
55	MF	(Ukraine) UKR	Anton Antoshyn	1	0	0+1	0	0	0
92	MF	(Brazil) BRA	Thiago Rômulo	8	0	3+5	0	0	0
94	MF	(Ukraine) UKR	Maksym Zaderaka	21	0	18+2	0	1	0
97	MF	(Ukraine) UKR	Andriy Yakymiv	29	1	16+11	1	1+1	0
Forwards
16	FW	(Ukraine) UKR	Artem Khotsyanovskyi	14	1	2+12	1	0	0
74	FW	(Ukraine) UKR	Ihor Nekhayev	1	0	0+1	0	0	0
96	FW	(Ukraine) UKR	Anatoliy Nuriyev	7	0	0+7	0	0	0
99	FW	(Ukraine) UKR	Vladyslav Vakula	4	0	0+3	0	0+1	0
Players transferred out during the season
18	DF	(Ukraine) UKR	Oleksandr Tymchyk	17	0	15	0	2	0
21	MF	(Armenia) ARM	Edgar Malakyan	19	4	14+3	4	2	0
27	FW	(Ukraine) UKR	Oleksiy Schebetun	5	0	4+1	0	0	0
33	DF	(Ukraine) UKR	Yevhen Tkachuk	11	0	10	0	1	0
44	MF	(Ukraine) UKR	Bohdan Mykhaylychenko	18	0	16	0	1+1	0
89	FW	(Serbia) SRB	Nemanja Obradović	11	2	8+1	2	1+1	0

Source: Competitions

Last updated: 19 May 2018

=== Goalscorers ===
Rank	No.	Pos	Nat	Name	Premier League	Cup	Total
1	17	MF	(Ukraine)	Orest Kuzyk	8	0	8
2	21	MF	(Armenia)	Edgar Malakyan	4	0	4
3	11	MF	(Ukraine)	Yuriy Klymchuk	2	1	3
4	8	MF	(Ukraine)	Maryan Mysyk	1	1	2
4	13	MF	(Ukraine)	Dmytro Kopytov	2	0	2
4	89	FW	(Serbia)	Nemanja Obradović	2	0	2
7	2	DF	(Brazil)	Johnathan	1	0	1
7	16	FW	(Ukraine)	Artem Khotsyanovskyi	1	0	1
7	23	MF	(Ukraine)	Mykhaylo Meskhi	1	0	1
7	97	MF	(Ukraine)	Andriy Yakymiv	1	0	1
				Total	23	2	25

Last updated: 19 May 2018

=== Clean sheets ===
Rank	No.	Pos	Nat	Name	Premier League	Cup	Total
1	71	GK	(Ukraine)	Herman Penkov	7	0	7
				Total	7	0	7

Last updated: 19 May 2018

=== Disciplinary record ===
No.	Pos	Nat	Player	Premier League			Cup			Total		
No.	Pos	Nat	Player	Booked	(yellow card) (yellow-red card)	Sent off (straight red)	Booked	(yellow card) (yellow-red card)	Sent off (straight red)	Booked	(yellow card) (yellow-red card)	Sent off (straight red)
2	DF	(Brazil)	Johnathan	3	1	0	0	0	0	3	1	0
3	MF	(Armenia)	Gor Malakyan	7	0	0	0	0	0	7	0	0
4	DF	(Ukraine)	Bohdan Mytsyk	1	0	0	0	0	0	1	0	0
7	MF	(Ukraine)	Danylo Knysh	2	0	0	0	0	0	2	0	0
8	MF	(Ukraine)	Maryan Mysyk	8	0	0	1	0	0	9	0	0
10	MF	(Ukraine)	Kyrylo Kostenko	1	0	0	0	0	0	1	0	0
11	MF	(Ukraine)	Yuriy Klymchuk	5	0	0	0	0	0	5	0	0
13	MF	(Ukraine)	Dmytro Kopytov	2	0	0	0	0	0	2	0	0
15	MF	(Ukraine)	Hlib Hrachov	4	1	0	1	0	0	5	1	0
16	FW	(Ukraine)	Artem Khotsyanovskyi	4	0	0	0	0	0	4	0	0
17	MF	(Ukraine)	Orest Kuzyk	0	0	0	1	0	0	1	0	0
18	DF	(Ukraine)	Oleksandr Tymchyk	5	0	0	0	0	0	5	0	0
20	DF	(Ukraine)	Anatoliy Ulyanov	0	1	0	0	0	0	0	1	0
21	MF	(Armenia)	Edgar Malakyan	5	0	0	0	0	0	5	0	0
22	DF	(Armenia)	Artur Danielyan	8	1	0	0	0	0	8	1	0
23	MF	(Ukraine)	Mykhaylo Meskhi	7	0	0	1	0	0	8	0	0
33	DF	(Ukraine)	Yevhen Tkachuk	0	0	0	0	1	0	0	1	0
44	MF	(Ukraine)	Bohdan Mykhaylychenko	5	0	0	0	0	0	5	0	0
66	DF	(Brazil)	Ebert	2	0	0	0	0	0	2	0	0
71	GK	(Ukraine)	Herman Penkov	3	0	0	1	0	0	4	0	0
88	DF	(Ukraine)	Ihor Oshchypko	2	0	0	0	0	0	2	0	0
92	MF	(Brazil)	Thiago Rômulo	1	0	0	0	0	0	1	0	0
94	MF	(Ukraine)	Maksym Zaderaka	1	0	0	0	0	0	1	0	0
97	MF	(Ukraine)	Andriy Yakymiv	8	0	0	1	0	0	9	0	0
			Total	84	4	0	6	1	0	90	5	0

Last updated: 19 May 2018

== Relocation of Stal from Kamianske to Bucha ==
Following its first game at Obolon Arena in Kyiv, on 29 August 2017 FC Stal Kamianske ended up in the revived conflict which is ongoing since the end of 2015 when the new president of Stal became Vardan Israelian. The club's fan movement issued an ultimatum to the club's administration to relinquish their rights to the club's brand or the fans will have the Football Federation of Ukraine and the UEFA be involved in the issue. It should be reminded that the club's administration promised to have own home stadium Metalurh ready as early as the 2017–18 season.

Earlier on 20 August 2017, the club stated in a press release that it experiences financial difficulties and renting Meteor Stadium is more expensive than to play in Kyiv. It also mentioned that considering the fact that its senior team is currently training in Bucha city, it would make more sense to conduct the club's games at the Obolon Arena in Kyiv.

On 15 December 2017, it was published a copy of official letter from Stal administration petitioning to the Bucha's mayor in helping to relocate to his city. The letter is dated on 21 November 2017, and Stal insists on necessity to accomplish it all before the attestation for the next UPL season. The Bucha city authorities confirmed their interest in hosting the Premier League club which they can accommodate with a small stadium "Yuvileinyi" that has a capacity of 1,028 spectators.

On 20 February 2018 it was confirmed that Stal has relocated to Pushcha-Vodytsia in Kyiv and since the next season will represent the city of Bucha.
