= Herman Penkov =

Ukrainian footballer

Personal information
- Full name: Herman Yuriyovych Penkov
- Date of birth: 26 May 1994 (age 32)
- Place of birth: Makiivka, Ukraine
- Height: 1.83 m (6 ft 0 in)
- Position: Goalkeeper

Team information
- Current team: Bukovyna Chernivtsi
- Number: 94

Youth career
- 2007: Knyazha Shchaslyve
- 2008–2011: Metalurh Donetsk

Senior career*
Years	Team	Apps	(Gls)
2011–2015	Metalurh Donetsk	0	(0)
2015–2018	Stal Kamianske	32	(0)
2018–2019	Karpaty Lviv	2	(0)
2019	Olimpik Donetsk	4	(0)
2020	Lviv	3	(0)
2021	Pyunik Yerevan	7	(0)
2021–2023	Mynai	4	(0)
2023–2025	LNZ Cherkasy	23	(0)
2025–	Bukovyna Chernivtsi	14	(0)

International career^{‡}
2015	Ukraine U21	1	(0)
- * Club domestic league appearances and goals as of 3 June 2026 ‡ National team caps and goals as of 23 January 2020

Herman Yuriyovych Penkov (Ukrainian: Герман Юрійович Пеньков; born 26 May 1994) is a Ukrainian professional footballer who plays as goalkeeper for Bukovyna Chernivtsi.

== Career ==
Penkov is a product of the Knyazha Shchaslyve and Metalurh Donetsk academies.

After dissolution of Metalurh Donetsk in 2015, he was signed by Stal Kamianske and made his debut for the main-squad in the winning game against Zorya Luhansk on 16 July 2017 in the Ukrainian Premier League.
