= Maryan Mysyk =

Ukrainian footballer

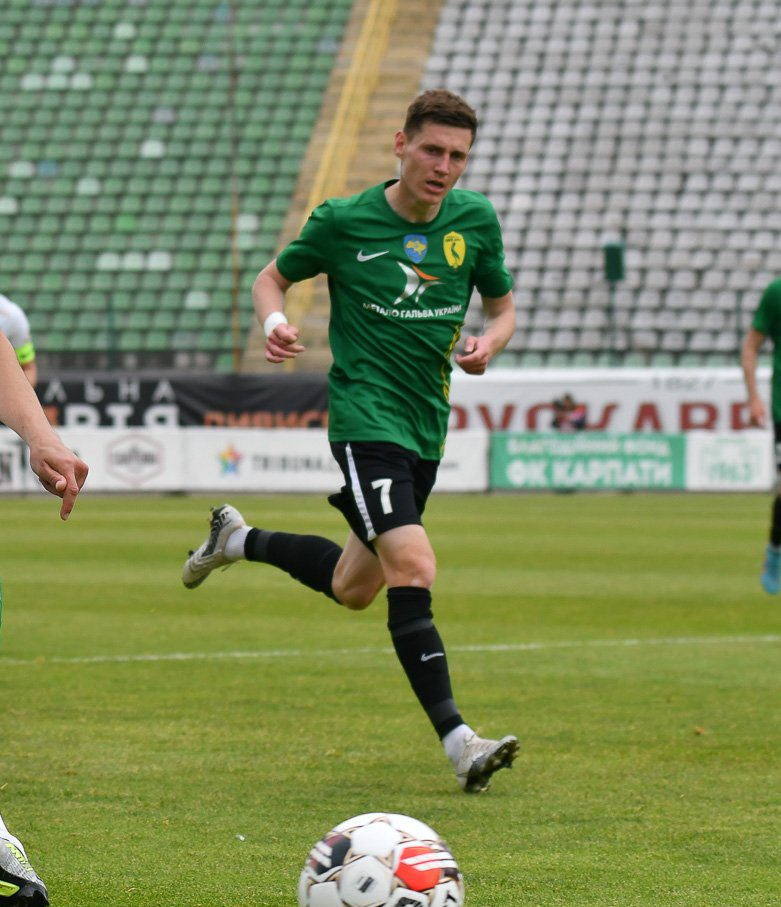

Personal information
- Full name: Maryan Olehovych Mysyk
- Date of birth: 2 October 1996 (age 30)
- Place of birth: Radekhiv, Ukraine
- Height: 1.74 m (5 ft 9 in)
- Position: Midfielder

Team information
- Current team: Nyva Ternopil
- Number: 33

Youth career
- 2009–2012: Lviv
- 2012–2013: Metalurh Donetsk

Senior career*
Years	Team	Apps	(Gls)
2013–2015	Metalurh Donetsk	1	(0)
2015–2018	Stal Kamianske	48	(1)
2018–2019	Vorskla Poltava	13	(0)
2019–2024	Rukh Lviv	69	(1)
2019	→ Veres Rivne (loan)	15	(3)
2024	Livyi Bereh Kyiv	9	(1)
2024	Inhulets Petrove	13	(0)
2025–	Nyva Ternopil	28	(6)

International career^{‡}
2014	Ukraine U18	5	(1)
2015–2016	Ukraine U19	10	(0)
2016–2017	Ukraine U20	5	(0)
2017–2018	Ukraine U21	3	(1)
- * Club domestic league appearances and goals as of 4 June 2026 ‡ National team caps and goals as of 22 May 2018

Maryan Olehovych Mysyk (Ukrainian: Мар'ян Олегович Мисик; born 2 October 1996) is a Ukrainian professional footballer who plays as a midfielder for Nyva Ternopil.

== Career ==
Mysyk is a product of the youth team system of FC Lviv. He signed a contract with FC Metalurh Donetsk in 2013.

He made his debut for FC Metalurh Donetsk in the game against FC Volyn Lutsk on 29 May 2015 in the Ukrainian Premier League. The media reported the interest of Borussia Dortmund and Tottenham Hotspur FC to Maryan Mysyk.
