= Nemanja Obradović =

Serbian footballer

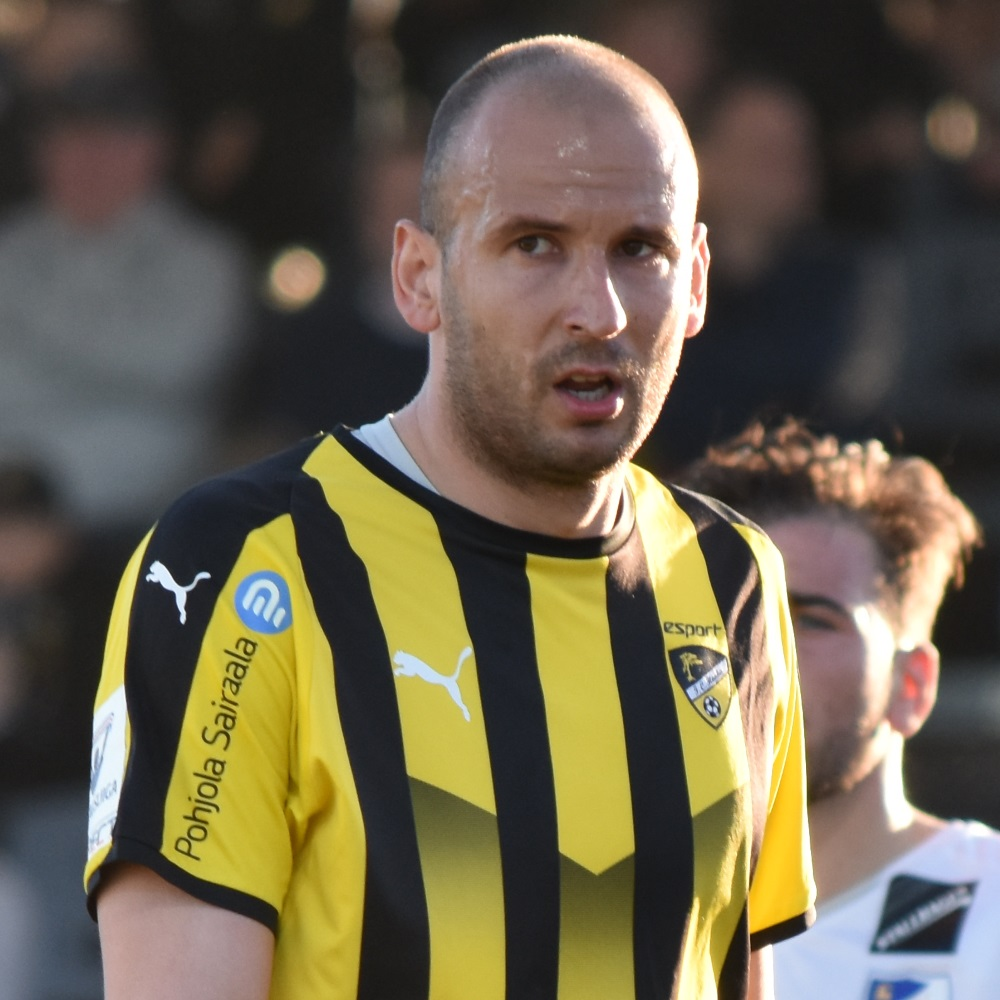

Personal information
- Date of birth: 29 May 1989 (age 37)
- Place of birth: Belgrade, SFR Yugoslavia
- Height: 1.78 m (5 ft 10 in)
- Position: Right wing

Team information
- Current team: Mladi Radnik

Youth career
- Rad

Senior career*
Years	Team	Apps	(Gls)
2007–2013	Rad	27	(1)
2009	→ Pobeda (loan)	8	(0)
2010	→ Palilulac Beograd (loan)	15	(1)
2010	→ Drina Zvornik (loan)	14	(3)
2011	→ Srem (loan)	17	(3)
2012	→ Proleter Novi Sad (loan)	31	(3)
2013–2014	Voždovac	30	(8)
2014	Kerkyra	5	(0)
2015	Lamia	4	(0)
2015–2016	Acharnaikos	28	(8)
2017	Čukarički	19	(4)
2017	Stal Kamianske	9	(2)
2018	Honka	8	(1)
2018–2019	Spartak Subotica	41	(11)
2020	Kisvárda	9	(2)
2020	Inđija	9	(2)
2021	FC Neftchi Fergana	0	(0)
2021	Apollon Larissa	14	(2)
2021	Kyzylzhar	8	(0)
2021–2022	Mladost Lučani	16	(1)
2022–2023	Radnički Novi Beograd	25	(2)
2023–2024	Smederevo 1924	33	(9)
2024-	Mladi Radnik		

International career^{‡}
	Serbia U21	1	(0)
- * Club domestic league appearances and goals as of 26 December 2023 ‡ National team caps and goals as of 1 January 2019

Nemanja Obradović (Serbian Cyrillic: Немања Обрадовић; born 29 May 1989) is a Serbian professional footballer who plays as a forward for Mladi Radnik.

== Career ==
This attacker has played for many clubs in his career. From Rad, in which he debuted, he spent time on loan in Macedonia (at Pobeda) and Bosnia and Herzegovina (at Drina Zvornik), as well as in the lower ranks of Serbia (at Srem and Proleter Novi Sad). In summer 2013, he joined Voždovac.
