= Wim Vrösch =

Dutch footballer and manager (1945–2021)

Personal information
- Full name: Willem Vrösch
- Date of birth: 20 March 1945
- Place of birth: Heerlen, Netherlands
- Date of death: 5 February 2021 (aged 75)
- Position: Defender

Senior career*
| Years | Team | Apps | (Gls) |
| 1963–1964 | Roda JC | | |
| 1964–1966 | Sparta Rotterdam | | |
| 1967–1970 | SV Limburgia | | |
| 1970–1974 | Fortuna Sittard | | |

Managerial career
- 1974–1975: Vijlen
- 1975–1977: Langeberg
- 1977–1984: Heerlen
- 1984–1991: Waubach
- 1991–1994: Meerssen
- 1994–2000: Roda JC (school director)
- 2000–2003: Roda JC (technical director)
- 2003–2004: Metalurh Donetsk (caretaker)
- 2004: Metalurh Donetsk (technical director)
- 2010–2011: VV Schaesberg
- * Club domestic league appearances and goals

Wim Vrösch (20 March 1945 — 5 February 2021) was a Dutch professional football player and manager.

== Playing career ==
Vrösch was born in Heerlen, and began playing in amateur clubs at the age of eight. In 1963 Wim Vrösch began his football career for Roda JC. After his contract ended, he began to play for Sparta Rotterdam. In 1967, he left Sparta Rotterdam to play for SV Limburgia. His football career ended at age 29, in the Fortuna Sittard.

== Managerial career ==
After completing his playing career, he began coaching. In 1974, he led club Vijlen that played in Division V. He then led club Langeberg (Division V), Heerlen (Division IV), Waubach (Division IV), and Meerssen (Division III). In 1994, he was appointed Director of the school football club Roda JC. In 2000, he was promoted to the position of technical director of Roda JC. On 28 July 2003, after the fourth round of the 2003–04 season in the Ukrainian League, he was again appointed interim coach for FC Metalurh Donetsk. On 14 March 2004, Vrösch was promoted to the post of technical director of Metalurh.
