= Dmytro Kopytov =

Ukrainian footballer (born 1998)

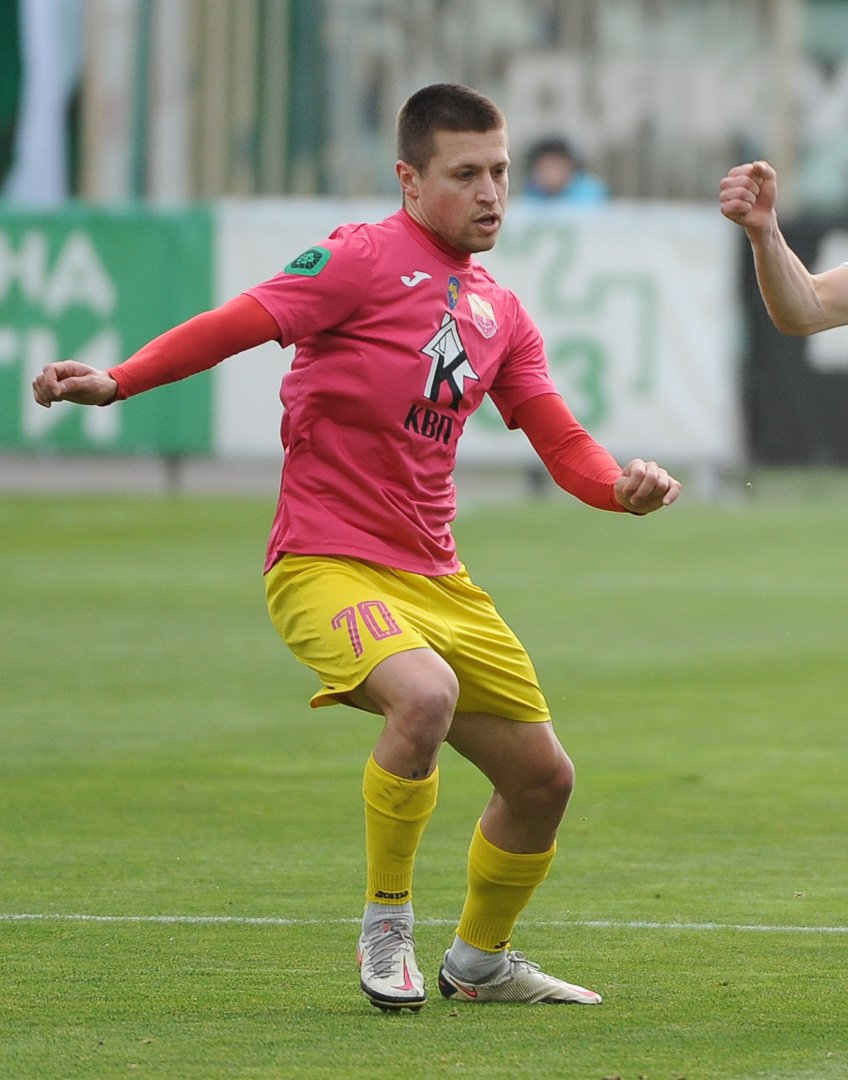
- Kopytov with Poltava in 2024

Personal information
- Full name: Dmytro Oleksandrovych Kopytov
- Date of birth: 29 May 1998 (age 28)
- Place of birth: Tereshky, Ukraine
- Height: 1.75 m (5 ft 9 in)
- Position: Midfielder

Team information
- Current team: Podlasie Biała Podlaska
- Number: 13

Youth career
- 2010–2012: Horpynko Sportive School Poltava
- 2012–2014: Metalurh Donetsk

Senior career*
| Years | Team | Apps | (Gls) |
| 2014–2015 | Metalurh Donetsk | 0 | (0) |
| 2015–2018 | Stal Kamianske | 19 | (2) |
| 2018–2019 | Dynamo Kyiv | 0 | (0) |
| 2019 | → Avanhard Kramatorsk (loan) | 2 | (0) |
| 2019–2020 | Lokomotiv Yerevan | 17 | (1) |
| 2020 | Bukovyna Chernivtsi | 8 | (0) |
| 2021 | Rubikon Kyiv | 13 | (0) |
| 2021–2024 | Poltava | 70 | (5) |
| 2024–2025 | Biali Sądów | 32 | (23) |
| 2025– | Podlasie Biała Podlaska | 25 | (1) |
- * Club domestic league appearances and goals as of 22:17, 3 June 2026 (UTC)

Dmytro Oleksandrovych Kopytov (Ukrainian: Дмитро Олександрович Копитов; born 29 May 1998) is a Ukrainian professional footballer who plays as a midfielder for Polish club Podlasie Biała Podlaska.

== Career ==
Kopytov is a product of the Horpynko Sportive School Poltava and Metalurh Donetsk youth team systems.

After dissolution of Metalurh Donetsk in 2015, he was signed by Stal Kamianske and made his debut for Stal's first team as a substitute in a Ukrainian Premier League game against Shakhtar Donetsk on 29 July 2017.
