= Kyrylo Kostenko =

Ukrainian footballer

Personal information
- Full name: Kyrylo Volodymyrovych Kostenko
- Date of birth: 4 December 1998 (age 27)
- Place of birth: Khmelnytskyi, Ukraine
- Height: 1.70 m (5 ft 7 in)
- Position: Midfielder

Youth career
- 2011–2012: Youth Sportive School #1 Khmelnytskyi
- 2012–2014: Metalurh Donetsk

Senior career*
Years	Team	Apps	(Gls)
2015	Metalurh Donetsk	0	(0)
2015–2018	Stal Kamianske	9	(0)
2018–2020	Oleksandriya	0	(0)
2020–2022	Podillya Khmelnytskyi	25	(8)
2022–2023	Epitsentr Kamianets-Podilskyi	3	(0)
2023–2024	Podillya Khmelnytskyi	21	(1)
- * Club domestic league appearances and goals as of 1 June 2025

Kyrylo Volodymyrovych Kostenko (Ukrainian: Кирило Володимирович Костенко; born 4 December 1998) is a Ukrainian footballer who plays as a midfielder.

== Career ==
Kostenko is a product of the Sportive School #1 Khmelnytskyi and Metalurh Donetsk youth team systems.

After dissolution of Metalurh Donetsk in 2015, he was signed by FC Stal Kamianske and made his debut for main-squad FC Stal in the winning game against FC Zorya Luhansk on 16 July 2017 in the Ukrainian Premier League.

In summer 2022 he moved to Epitsentr Dunaivtsi. In February 2023 his contract with the club expired.
