= Anatoliy Ulyanov =

Ukrainian footballer

Personal information
- Full name: Anatoliy Andriyovych Ulyanov
- Date of birth: 26 July 1998 (age 28)
- Place of birth: Terebovlia, Ukraine
- Height: 1.86 m (6 ft 1 in)
- Position: Defender

Team information
- Current team: Nyva Terebovlia

Youth career
- 2011–2012: Youth Sportive School Ternopil
- 2012: BRW-VIK Volodymyr-Volynskyi
- 2013–2014: Metalurh Donetsk

Senior career*
Years	Team	Apps	(Gls)
2015	Metalurh Donetsk	0	(0)
2015–2018	Stal Kamianske	2	(0)
2018	Kalush	13	(0)
2019–2020	Volyn Lutsk	11	(1)
2020	Nyva Ternopil	4	(0)
2021	Prykarpattia Ivano-Frankivsk	5	(0)
2021–2022	Mykolaiv	3	(0)
2021–2022	→ Kremin Kremenchuk (loan)	6	(0)
2022	Kolos Polonne	1	(0)
2022–	Nyva Terebovlia	7	(1)

International career
2017	Ukraine U19	2	(0)
- * Club domestic league appearances and goals as of 24 April 2023

Anatoliy Andriyovych Ulyanov (Ukrainian: Анатолій Андрійович Ульянов; born 26 July 1998) is a Ukrainian professional football defender who plays for amateur club Nyva Terebovlia in Ternopil Oblast.

== Career ==
Ulyanov is a product of the Youth Sportive School Ternopil, BRW-VIK Volodymyr-Volynskyi and Metalurh Donetsk youth sportive team systems.

After dissolution of Metalurh Donetsk in 2015, he was signed by FC Stal Kamianske and made his debut for main-squad FC Stal in the game against FC Dynamo Kyiv on 26 November 2017 in the Ukrainian Premier League. He featured in 2 games for Stal. On 23 August 2022 Ulyanov moved to Ukrainian Second League club Kalush. He played in 16 matches for the club.

In first part of 2019 Ulyanov joined Ukrainian First League club Volyn Lutsk where he played in 18 matches and scored 1 goal. Next season he signed for another First League club Nyva Ternopil. He featured in 4 matches. In March of the same season he transferred to Prykarpattia Ivano-Frankivsk where he played in 5 games.

On 23 July 2021 he moved to Ukrainian Second League club Mykolaiv. He played in 3 games. Ulyanov then joined Ukrainian First League club Kremin Kremenchuk on 20 October 2021 on a season-long loan, taking shirt number 26. He featured in 6 matches playing for 508 minutes. When his contract ended on 8 August 2022 he was released.

On 23 August 2022 Ulyanov featured in a friendly match for Kolos Polonne as part of their preparations for upcoming Khmelnytskyi Oblast championship. He moved to another amateur side Nyva Terebovlia in 2022. On 19 April 2023 he played in a friendly for his team.
