= Danylo Knysh =

Ukrainian footballer

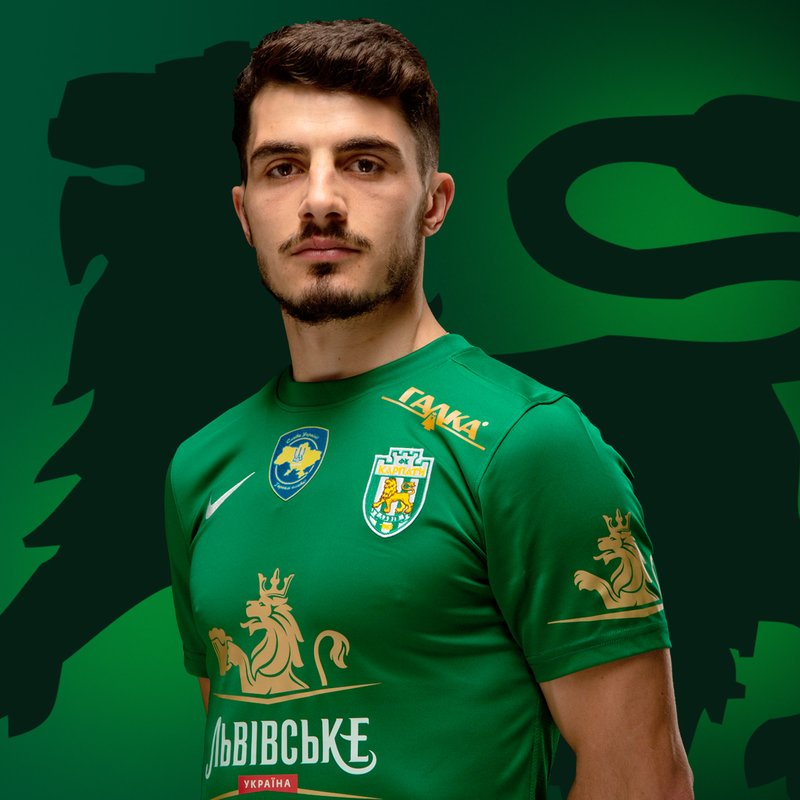

Personal information
- Full name: Danylo Serhiyovych Knysh
- Date of birth: 3 March 1996 (age 30)
- Place of birth: Artsyz, Ukraine
- Height: 1.75 m (5 ft 9 in)
- Position: Midfielder

Team information
- Current team: Viktoriya Sumy
- Number: 10

Youth career
- 2009: Monolit Illichivsk
- 2010–2013: Dynamo Kyiv

Senior career*
Years	Team	Apps	(Gls)
2013–2016	Dynamo Kyiv	0	(0)
2017–2018	Stal Kamianske	15	(0)
2018–2019	Kalush	41	(10)
2020–2022	Mynai	41	(3)
2022–2023	Metalist Kharkiv	11	(0)
2023	→ Karpaty Lviv (loan)	5	(0)
2023	Nyva Buzova	17	(3)
2024	Bukovyna Chernivtsi	3	(0)
2024–	Viktoriya Sumy	49	(5)

International career
2013	Ukraine U17	3	(0)
2014–2015	Ukraine U19	6	(0)
- * Club domestic league appearances and goals as of 4 June 2026

Danylo Serhiyovych Knysh (Ukrainian: Данило Сергійович Книш; born 3 March 1996) is a Ukrainian professional footballer who plays as a midfielder for Viktoriya Sumy.

== Career ==
Born in Artsyz, Knysh is a product of the Monolit Illichivsk and Dynamo Kyiv sportive schools.

He played for FC Dynamo in the Ukrainian Premier League Reserves and was released in September 2016. In March 2017 Knysh signed contract with FC Stal Kamianske in the Ukrainian Premier League. He made his debut in the Ukrainian Premier League for Stal Kamianske on 16 July 2017, playing in a winning match against FC Zorya Luhansk. In January 2023 he moved on loan to Karpaty Lviv.
