= Yuriy Klymchuk =

Ukrainian footballer

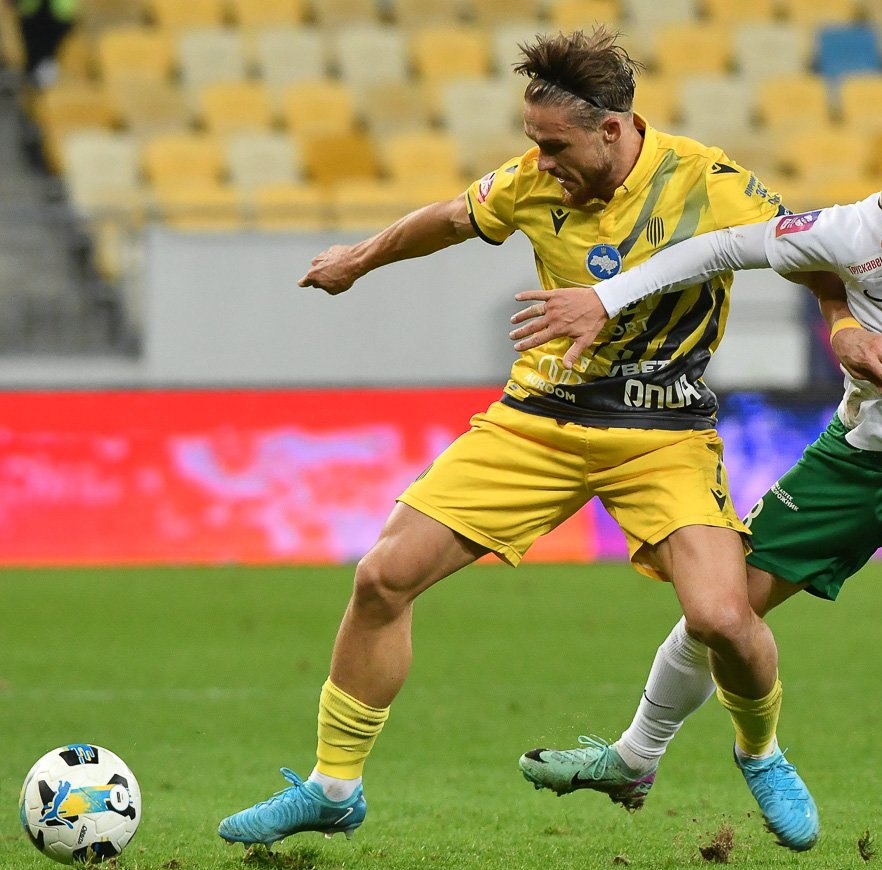

Personal information
- Full name: Yuriy Serhiyovych Klymchuk
- Date of birth: 5 May 1997 (age 29)
- Place of birth: Rohachi, Zhytomyr Oblast, Ukraine
- Height: 1.78 m (5 ft 10 in)
- Position: Left winger

Team information
- Current team: Kolos Kovalivka
- Number: 70

Youth career
- 2010: Lokomotyv Kyiv
- 2010–2013: Atlet Kyiv
- 2013: BRW-VIK Volodymyr-Volynskyi
- 2013–2014: Atlet Kyiv

Senior career*
Years	Team	Apps	(Gls)
2015	Lokomotyv Kyiv	10	(6)
2016–2018	Stal Kamianske	30	(2)
2019–2025	Rukh Lviv	130	(41)
2025–	Kolos Kovalivka	24	(7)
- * Club domestic league appearances and goals as of 3 June 2026

Yuriy Serhiyovych Klymchuk (Ukrainian: Юрій Сергійович Климчук; born 5 May 1997) is a Ukrainian professional footballer who plays as a left winger for the Ukrainian Premier League club Kolos Kovalivka.

== Career ==
Klymchuk is a product of the different Kyivan youth team systems.

From March 2016 he plays for FC Stal Kamianske and made his debut for FC Stal in the game against FC Zirka Kropyvnytskyi on 23 April 2017 in the Ukrainian Premier League.

== Honours ==
Individual

- SportArena Player of the Round: 2025–26 (Round 13)
- Ukraine Premier League Player of the Round: 2025–26 (Round 13),
