= Volodymyr Havrylov =

Ukrainian association football player

Volodymyr Mykolayovych Havrylov (Ukrainian: Володимир Миколайович Гаврилов; born July 16, 1960, Novoshakhtinsk, Rostov Region, RSFSR) is a Soviet and Ukrainian footballer. He played as a goalkeeper, later became a coach. Master of Sports of the USSR.

== Biography ==
In 1984 Volodymyr moved to Shakhtar Donetsk, but did not make his way to the first team and was an understudy for Valentyn Elinskas, and later for Serhiy Zolotnytskyi. He played his debut match on September 28, 1984, against Dinamo Tbilisi.

He also took part in two matches of the USSR Cup and the Cup game of the 1986 season. During the 1986 season he moved to Shakhtar (Gorlovka). Since 1987 he played for Rostselmash, played over 100 matches in the first league. The last season of the USSR championship was spent in the AIC team (Azov). After the collapse of the USSR, he returned to Ukraine and in the first season of the national championship played in the teams of the lower leagues. In the 1992-1993 season he returned to Shakhtar Donetsk, but did not become a regular player. For a considerable period of time he played for Shakhtar's double in the second league.

In the Ukrainian Cup match against Vanguard (Rovenka) he scored a hat-trick, having converted three penalties, his team won with a score of 5:3.

== Coaching career ==
Since 1998 he has been working as a trainer. In September 1998 he became the head coach of Metallurg Donetsk and headed the team until the start of the winter break. Then for many years he worked in various clubs in Ukraine as a goalkeeper coach, a youth sports school coach, in Volyn he headed the backup team.

== Successes and decorations ==
=== Club successes ===
- vice-champion of the Ukrainian Championship: 1994
- finalist Ukrainian Cup: 1995
