= Ihor Oshchypko =

Ukrainian professional footballer (born 1985)

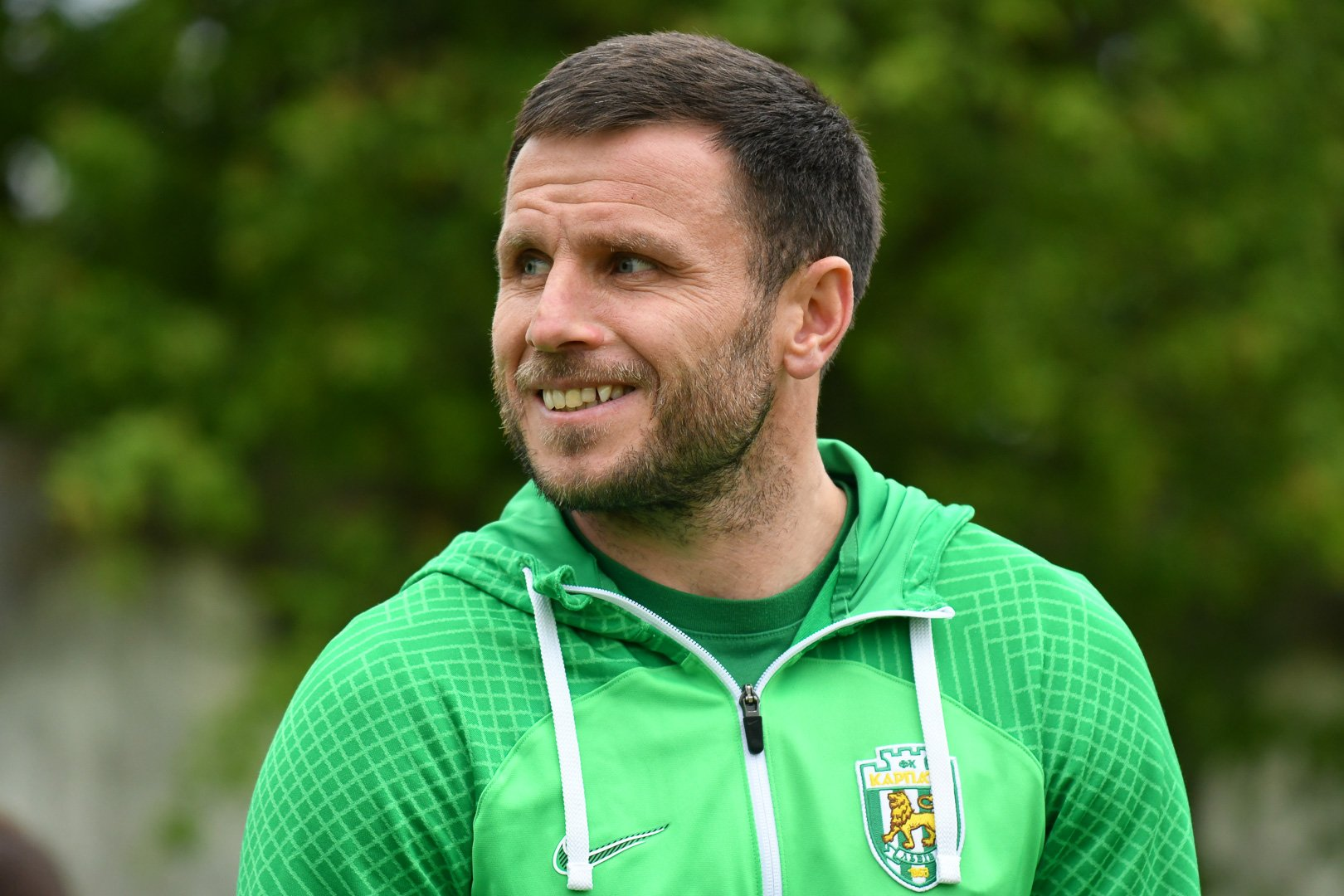

Personal information
- Full name: Ihor Dmytrovych Oshchypko
- Date of birth: 25 October 1985 (age 41)
- Place of birth: Serafyntsi, Ivano-Frankivsk Oblast, Soviet Union (now Ukraine)
- Height: 1.73 m (5 ft 8 in)
- Position: Left back

Team information
- Current team: Feniks Pidmonastyr (player); Karpaty Halych (assistant)
- Number: 8

Youth career
- 1998: Arsenal Kyiv
- 1998–2002: RVUFK Kyiv
- 2002–2003: Mostransgaz Gazoprovod

Senior career*
Years	Team	Apps	(Gls)
2004–2008	Shakhtar Donetsk	1	(0)
2004–2006	→ Shakhtar-2 Donetsk	63	(1)
2007	→ Shakhtar-3 Donetsk	3	(1)
2008	→ Karpaty Lviv (loan)	9	(1)
2008–2013	Karpaty Lviv	106	(11)
2015	Sturm Graz	3	(0)
2015	Zaria Bălți	10	(0)
2016	Botev Plovdiv	10	(0)
2017	Lviv	9	(1)
2018	Stal Kamianske	12	(0)
2018–2020	Mynai	23	(0)
2021–	Feniks Pidmonastyr	23	(2)

International career
2005	Ukraine U21	1	(0)
2010	Ukraine	3	(0)

Managerial career
- 2019–2020: Mynai (technical coach)
- 2021–: Karpaty Halych (technical coach)
- * Club domestic league appearances and goals as of 29 June 2022

Ihor Dmytrovych Oshchypko (Ukrainian: Ігор Дмитрович Ощипко; born 25 October 1985) is a Ukrainian amateur and former professional footballer who plays as a left back for Feniks Pidmonastyr and current technical coach of Karpaty Halych.

== Club career ==
=== Karpaty Lviv ===
He was promoted from the reserves squad of Karpaty Lviv and debuted in the Premier League on 1 March 2008.

=== Botev Plovdiv ===
On 18 January 2016 Oshchypko signed a contract with Botev Plovdiv. In his debut in A Grupa, on 20 February 2016, he provided an assist for the goal scored by Lachezar Baltanov for the 1–0 win over the local rivals Lokomotiv Plovdiv.
