= Bohdan Rudyuk =

Ukrainian footballer

Personal information
- Full name: Bohdan Andriyovych Rudyuk
- Date of birth: 19 April 1994 (age 32)
- Place of birth: Pokotylivka, Ukraine
- Height: 1.92 m (6 ft 4 in)
- Position: Defender

Youth career
- 2009: Helios Kharkiv
- 2010–2011: Vostok Kharkiv

Senior career*
Years	Team	Apps	(Gls)
2011	Stakhanov		
2012	Shchastia		
2012	Tavriya Simferopol	0	(0)
2013–2014	Zorya Luhansk	0	(0)
2015	Bodva Moldava nad Bodvou	13	(2)
2015	Poprad	0	(0)
2016	Rimavská Sobota	12	(0)
2016	Slutsk	10	(0)
2017	Dnepr Mogilev	12	(1)
2017	Krumkachy Minsk	11	(1)
2018	Stal Kamianske	0	(0)
- * Club domestic league appearances and goals as of 31 May 2018

Bohdan Rudyuk (Ukrainian: Богдан Андрійович Рудюк; born 19 April 1994) is a Ukrainian former professional football defender.

== Career ==
Rudiuk is a product of the youth team systems of FC Helios and FC Vostok. During 2011–2012 he played in the amateur teams of Luhansk Oblast, and in 2012 signed a contract with SC Tavriya and played in the Ukrainian Premier League Reserves and Under 19 Championship, but in January 2013 he signed a contract with FC Zorya Then he transferred to Slovakia and played in the different 3 clubs.
