= Artem Khotsyanovskyi =

Ukrainian footballer

Personal information
- Full name: Artem Leonidovych Khotsyanovskyi
- Date of birth: 20 October 1998 (age 28)
- Place of birth: Zhytomyr, Ukraine
- Height: 1.85 m (6 ft 1 in)
- Position: Striker

Team information
- Current team: Dinaz Vyshhorod
- Number: 16

Youth career
- 2010: Polissya Zhytomyr
- 2011–2012: Dynamo Kyiv
- 2012–2015: UFK-Karpaty Lviv

Senior career*
Years	Team	Apps	(Gls)
2015–2018	Stal Kamianske	14	(1)
2018–2019	Dynamo Kyiv	0	(0)
2019	→ Avanhard Kramatorsk (loan)	9	(1)
2019	Hirnyk-Sport Horishni Plavni	12	(0)
2020	Veres Rivne	10	(0)
2021	Kremin Kremenchuk	5	(0)
2023–	Dinaz Vyshhorod	14	(1)
- * Club domestic league appearances and goals as of 20 March 2024

Artem Leonidovych Khotsyanovskyi (Ukrainian: Артем Леонідович Хоцяновський; born 20 October 1998) is a Ukrainian professional footballer who plays as a striker for Dinaz Vyshhorod in the Ukrainian First League.

== Career ==
Born in Zhytomyr, Khotsyanovskyi is a product of the Polissya Zhytomyr, Dynamo Kyiv and UFK Lviv sportive schools.

In summer 2015 Khotsyanovskyi signed contract with FC Stal Kamianske and played in the Ukrainian Premier League Reserves. He made his debut in the Ukrainian Premier League for Stal Kamianske on 5 August 2017, playing in a match against FC Karpaty Lviv.
