= Vardan Israelian =

Armenian football player (born 1966)

Personal information
- Full name: Vardan Israelian
- Date of birth: 14 September 1966 (age 60)
- Place of birth: Yerevan, Armenian SSR
- Height: 1.78 m (5 ft 10 in)
- Position: Defender

Youth career
- 1985: FC Ararat Yerevan

Senior career*
Years	Team	Apps	(Gls)
1988	FC Iskra Yerevan	24	(0)
1989	FC Prometei Yerevan	31	(1)
1991	FC Arax Hoktemberyan	25	(1)
1992–1997	FC Banants Kotayk	110	(3)
1999	Erebuni FC	22	(0)

Managerial career
- 1998–1999: Armenia U-21 (assistant)
- 1999–2000: FC Stal Alchevsk (assistant)
- 2002–2015: FC Metalurh Donetsk (sports director)
- * Club domestic league appearances and goals

Vardan Israelian (Ukrainian: Вардан Ісраелян; born 14 September 1966) is a former Armenian footballer and Ukrainian football functionary, president of FC Stal Kamianske.

He is a graduate of the Yerevan Polytechnic Institute.

Sporting positions
Preceded by Maksym Zavhorodniy	President of FC Stal Kamianske; 2015–	Succeeded by incumbent
