= Obolon Arena =

Association football stadium in Ukraine

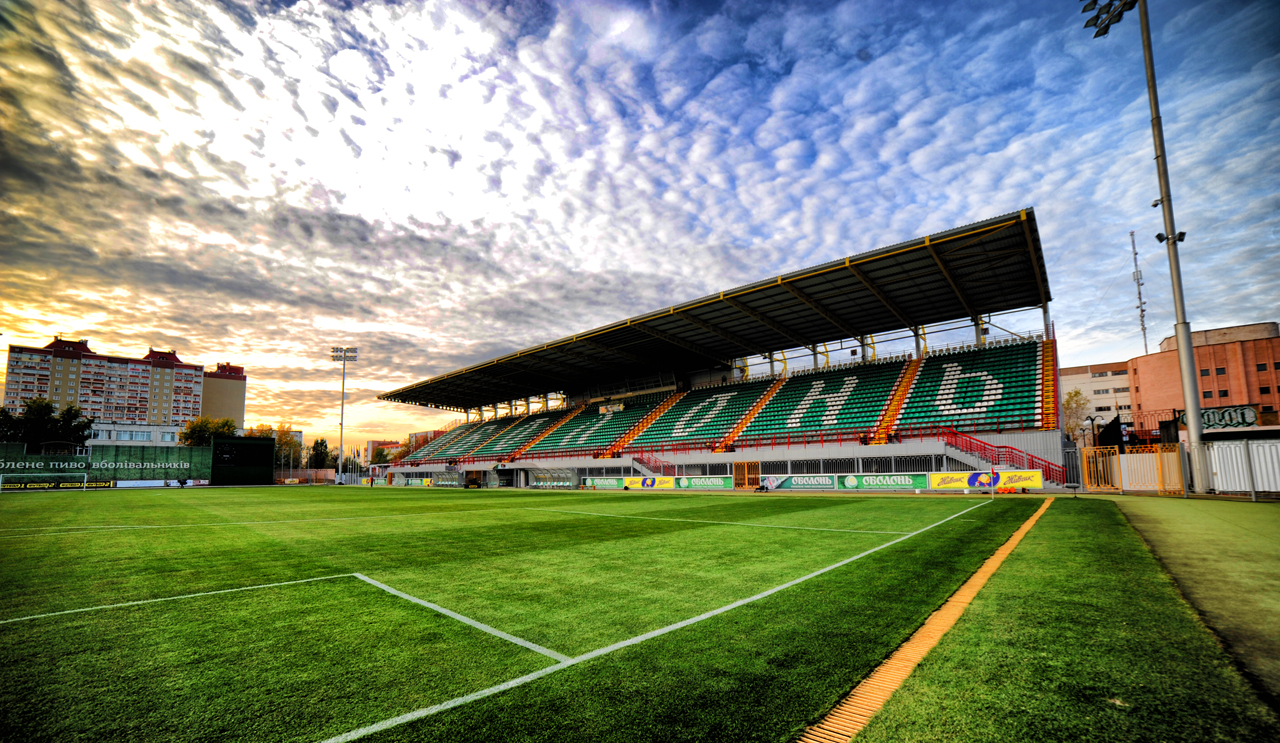
- Interactive map of Obolon Arena
- Former names: Obolon Stadium (2001–11)
- Location: Kyiv, Ukraine
- Coordinates: 50°31′37.40″N 30°30′27.00″E
- Owner: Obolon
- Capacity: 5,103
- Surface: Grass
- Field size: 104 m × 68 m (341 ft × 223 ft)

Construction
- Groundbreaking: 2001
- Opened: 2002
- Expanded: 2004

Tenants
- FC Obolon Kyiv; Kudrivka since 2025; Ukraine U-21

Obolon Arena is a football stadium in the city of Kyiv, Ukraine. It is the home ground of football club Obolon Kyiv. The stadium was used by teams of the top national league since 2002.

The stadium has been actively used by the Ukraine national under-21 football team as well. Along with Bannikov training complex, it is one of the main alternative stadiums of the team.

== History ==
In late 1970's the 11th microdistrict of the Obolon residential massif was built with two schools at Pivnichna Street, both schools sharing one large football ground between them. In 2001 the ground was bought by Obolon brewery and demolished to build a stadium for their football team.

The stadium was opened in October 2002 with a Ukraine Premier League game which saw FC Obolon Kyiv play against Kryvbas.

In late 2006, construction began on the northern stand and the work was completed in the summer of 2008. This stand added 3,000 additional seats.

The record attendance for a match at the ground is 5,300, set on 3 April 2010 in the match between Obolon and Shakhtar Donetsk.

After the main player of the stadium FC Obolon Kyiv dissolved itself in February 2013, the stadium became the playing-ground of the (new) club Obolon Brovar.

== Other users of the stadium ==
The stadium was the home ground of FC Obolon Kyiv (this club dissolved itself in February 2013); but was also temporarily used by FC Arsenal Kyiv (2008).

The Ukraine under-21 team hosted an international game against Holland on 10 October 2008.

The ground was used as a training facility for Euro 2012.

The stadium served as home ground of FC Stal Kamianske for the 2017-18 Ukrainian Premier League returning UPL games to the stadium since relegation of Obolon in 2012.

On 28 July 2020 the club Desna Chernihiv announced that will play its games for the Europa League third qualifying round at Obolon Arena.

In 2025 the club Kudrivka announced that will play its home games in Obolon Arena for the Ukrainian Premier League.

== Location ==
The stadium is located in the northern fringes of the city. The closest to the stadium Kyiv Metro railway station is Heroiv Dnipra which requires some 10–15 minutes of "hike" to the stadium.

The stadium is located between two of the city's high schools (245 and 170).
