= FC Stal Kamianske =

Stal Kamianske
- Full name: FC Stal Kamianske
- Founded: 1926
- Dissolved: 2018
- Ground: Metalurh Stadium, Kamianske (until 2015); Meteor Stadium, Dnipro (2015–2017); Obolon Arena, Kyiv (2017–2018)
- Capacity: 2,900 (Metalurh Stadium)
- Chairman: Vardan Israelian
- 2017–18: UPL, 12th (relegated)
- Website: http://fcstal.com.ua
Home colours	Away colours

FC Stal Kamianske (Ukrainian: Сталь Кам'янське) was a professional Ukrainian football club based in Kamianske, Dnipropetrovsk Oblast, Ukraine. After being relegated to the Ukrainian First League after the 2017–18 Ukrainian Premier League season, the club re-registered to Bucha and changed its name to PFC Feniks Bucha in June 2018. The club didn't play any game under the new name and was dissolved on 9 July 2018.

The club was sponsored by the Dnieper Metallurgical Combine (DMK) which is a member of the Industrial Union of Donbas (ISD).

== History ==
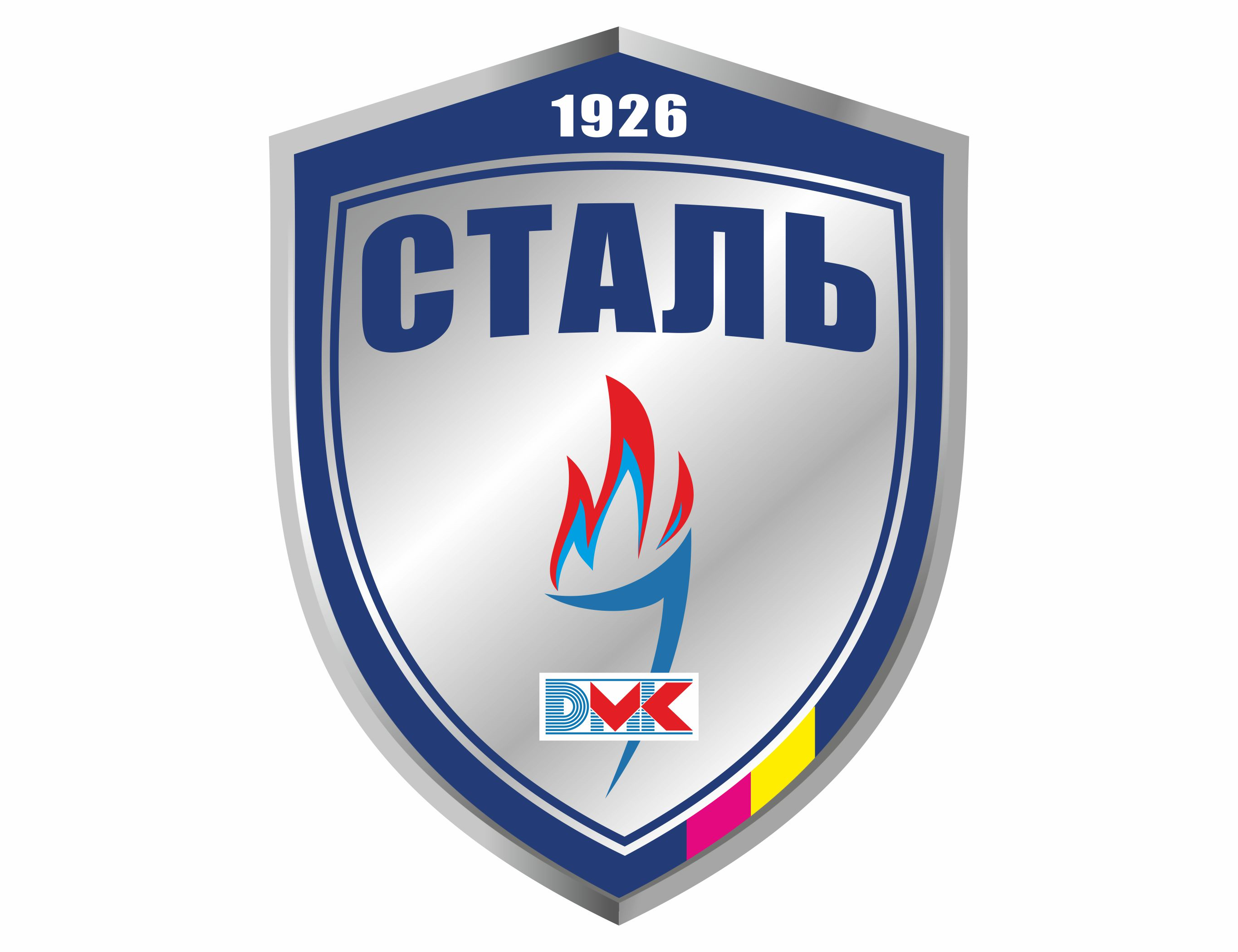
Former logo, as Stal Kamianske.

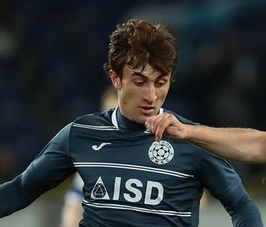
Gor Malakyan in the Stal's jersey with ISD

The club traces its history to a factory team that was created in 1926 under the name of FC Metalist Kamianske. Later the name was changed to FC Dzerzhynka Kamianske (1934). The team participated in competitions irregularly. It entered Soviet competitions in 1935 as a city's team (Kamianske, 1935–1936) participating in Ukrainian Championship. In 1936, the city of Kamianske was renamed as Dniprodzerzhynsk. In 1936 and in 1938 it entered the Soviet Cup competitions and in 1938 was a runner up of the Ukrainian Championship as Stal Dniprodzerzhynsk yielding only to Dzerzhynets Voroshylovhrad (today FC Zorya Luhansk). There is no record of any competitions in the region during World War II.

In 1945, Dniprodzerzhynsk city players participated in the Ukrainian Spartakiad as members of Dnipropetrovsk Oblast team. In 1949, Metalurh Dniprodzerzhynsk was again a runner-up at the republican competitions, losing a championship playoff to the Kievan Officers' Club (modern FC CSKA Kyiv). Between 1954 and 1975, the Dniprodzerzhynsk metallurgical team did not participate in any national or republican competitions focusing only on regional and city's championships. The club was completely overshadowed by another team from Kamianske (at that time Dniprodzerzhynsk), SC Prometei Dniprodzerzhynsk, that after World War II and until the 1970s was the main city's team.

In 1976, under the name of Metalurh Dniprodzerzhynsk, the team was revived including not only factory players, but also football players of SC Prometei Dniprodzerzhynsk (sports club of the Dnieper Chemical Plant) and Burevisnyk Dniprodzerzhynsk (city's education department sports society). In 1978, the new team won the Ukrainian championship for amateur clubs and was promoted to the Soviet Second League. The club's best achievement was 12th place in the 1982–83 season, and it was soon relegated in 1985.

In 1994, the club became almost defunct. In 1998, the team was reorganized again under the name FC Stal Dniprodzerzhynsk. The team became one of the strongest in Dnipropetrovsk Oblast and in 2001, it was promoted to the Ukrainian amateur championship. In the same year, Stal won the Dnipropetrovsk Oblast Cup and was promoted to the Druha Liha B. In the 2003–04 season, Stal became the champions of the division and were promoted to the Persha Liha.

Stal finished in 20th place (bottom) in the 2007–08 season and were relegated to Ukrainian Second League.

After a six-season absence, the club was promoted to Ukrainian First League in 2014. In 2015, the club was set to merge with FC Metalurh Donetsk. However, on 11 July 2015 Metalurh declared bankruptcy, citing the economic difficulties caused by the War in Donbas. FC Stal Dniprodzerzhynsk did take Metalurh's place in the Ukrainian Premier League.

In May 2016, the city of Dniprodzerzhynsk was renamed back into Kamianske and team name was changed to FC Stal Kamianske.

After being relegated to the Ukrainian First League following the 2017–18 Ukrainian Premier League season, the club re-registered to Bucha (Kyiv Oblast) and changed its name to PFC Feniks Bucha. Before the start of the new season, the club withdrew from 2018–19 Ukrainian First League due to financial difficulties.

== Colors and badge ==
Club's colors are silver, blue and white.

== Last squad ==
As of 16 July 2018

Note: Flags indicate national team as defined under FIFA eligibility rules; some limited exceptions apply. Players may hold more than one non-FIFA nationality.

No.	Pos.	Nation	Player
1	GK	UKR	Danylo Ryabenko
4	DF	UKR	Bohdan Mytsyk
7	MF	UKR	Danylo Knysh
10	MF	UKR	Kyrylo Kostenko
11	MF	UKR	Yuriy Klymchuk
13	MF	UKR	Dmytro Kopytov
14	MF	BUL	Aram Adamyan
16	FW	UKR	Artem Khotsyanovskyi
20	DF	UKR	Anatoliy Ulyanov
22	DF	ARM	Artur Danielyan

No.	Pos.	Nation	Player
23	MF	UKR	Mykhaylo Meskhi
25	GK	UKR	Ivan Siletskyi
66	DF	BRA	Ebert
74	FW	UKR	Ihor Nekhayev
77	GK	UKR	Mykyta Zelenskyi
87	DF	UKR	Bohdan Rudyuk
88	DF	UKR	Ihor Oshchypko
92	MF	BRA	Thiago Rômulo
97	MF	UKR	Andriy Yakymiv
98	FW	UKR	Vladyslav Andrusenko

=== Coaches and administration (before dissolving) ===
Administration	Coaching (senior team)	Coaching (U-21 team)
President – Vardan Israelian	Head coach – (Bulgaria) Nikolay Kostov; Senior coach – (Bulgaria) Nedelcho Matushev; Coach – Kyrylo Nesterenko; Goalies coach – Ihor Bilan	Senior coach – Viktor Zhuravlyov; Coach – Oleksandr Zotov; Goalies coach – Volodymyr Havrylov

== Presidents ==
- 2001–2005: Maksym Zavhorodniy
- 2005–2007: Oleh Dubina
- 2007–2010: Maksym Zavhorodniy
- 2010–2011: Illia Buha
- 2011–2015: Maksym Zavhorodniy
- 2015–2018: Vardan Israelian

== Honours ==
- Ukrainian First League
  - Runners-up (1): 2014–15
- Ukrainian Second League
  - Winners (1): 2003–04
  - Runners-up (1): 2013–14
- Championship of the Ukrainian SSR
  - Runners-up (2): 1938, 1949 (amateur level competitions until 1960)
- Ukrainian KFK championship
  - Winners (1): 1978
- Dnipropetrovsk Oblast Championship
  - Winners (10): 1938, 1945, 1946, 1947, 1948, 1949, 1950, 1978, 1988, 1992

== League and cup history ==
=== Soviet Union ===
Season	Div.	Pos.	Pl.	W	D	L	GS	GA	P	Domestic Cup	Europe	Notes
Stal
1936	6th "Tretia Hrupa" (Ukrainian Championship)	W	Elimination tournament in final Stal beat Dynamo Kryvyi Rih 4:1									
1937	5th "Druha Hrupa" (Ukrainian Championship)	2	5	3	1	1	17	7	12			
1938	4th "Persha Hrupa" (Ukrainian Championship)	2	11	7	3	1	40	20	28			
1939	4th "Persha Hrupa" (Ukrainian Championship)	4	9	3	3	3	17	12	18			
1940	4th "Persha Hrupa" (Ukrainian Championship)	4	?	?	?	?	?	?	?			
1941-1944	Due to World War II, the club was dissolved and did not function.											
Metallurg / Metalurh
1948	4th "Zone 3" (Ukrainian Championship)	1	10	10	0	0	48	10	20			
1948	4th "Zone 3" (Ukrainian Championship)	3	4	2	0	2	10	8	4			semifinal group 2
1949	4th "Zone 3" (Ukrainian Championship)	1	9	7	1	1	34	8	15			
1949	4th "Zone 3" (Ukrainian Championship)	1	4	3	0	1	7	2	6			Lost championship playoff to DO Kiev
1950	4th "Zone 2" (Ukrainian Championship)	2	17	13	1	3	40	24	27			
1951	4th "Zone 4" (Ukrainian Championship)	4	18	11	4	3	40	15	26			
1952	4th "Zone 3" (Ukrainian Championship)	9	22	5	6	11	19	45	16			
1953-1957	Club's status is unknown											
1958	4th "Zone 8" (Ukrainian Championship)	7	14	3	1	10	11	29	7			
1959-1974	Club's status is unknown											
1975-1976	Club participates in regional competitions											
1977	4th (KFK (Ukraine))	6	22	8	7	7	25	21	23			
1978	4th (KFK (Ukraine))	1	18	13	4	1	31	9	30			qualified for final group
1978	4th (KFK (Ukraine))	1	5	5	0	0	9	3	10			Promoted
1979	3rd (Vtoraya Liga)	23	46	13	8	25	37	71	34			
1980	3rd (Vtoraya Liga)	18	44	11	11	22	47	58	33			
1981	3rd (Vtoraya Liga)	22	44	8	13	23	31	71	29			
1982	3rd (Vtoraya Liga)	12	46	17	9	20	47	47	43			
1983	3rd (Vtoraya Liga)	12	50	17	14	19	35	39	48			
1984	3rd (Vtoraya Liga)	11	24	4	7	13	23	38	15			
1984	3rd (Vtoraya Liga)	24	14	5	4	5	17	19	14			
1985	3rd (Vtoraya Liga)	13	26	5	4	17	20	45	14			
1985	3rd (Vtoraya Liga)	28	14	4	3	7	14	22	11			Relegated
1986-1988	Club participates in regional competitions											
1989	4th (KFK (Ukraine))	7	24	9	7	8	34	32	25			
1990-1992	Club participates in regional competitions											

=== Ukraine ===
Season	Div.	Pos.	Pl.	W	D	L	GS	GA	P	Domestic Cup	Europe	Notes
Metalurh
1992–93	4th (Amateurs)	10	26	6	11	9	30	30	23			
1993–2001	Club participates in regional competitions. In 1998 changed its name to Stal.											
2001	4th (Amateurs)	2	4	2	1	1	5	4	7			applied to Second League
2001–02	3rd "C" (Druha Liha)	12	34	11	7	16	29	47	40	Did not enter		
2002–03	3rd "C" (Druha Liha)	5	28	16	4	8	35	22	52	1/32 finals		
2003–04	3rd "C" (Druha Liha)	1	30	23	6	1	53	16	75	1/32 finals		Promoted
2004–05	2nd (Persha Liha)	9	34	14	7	13	42	47	49	1/16 finals		
2005–06	2nd (Persha Liha)	8	34	13	9	12	34	29	48	1/8 finals		
2006–07	2nd (Persha Liha)	9	36	15	8	13	42	37	53	1/4 finals		
2007–08	2nd (Persha Liha)	20	38	3	11	24	23	58	20	1/32 finals		Relegated
2008–09	3rd "B" (Druha Liha)	3	34	21	7	6	62	29	70	1/32 finals		
2009–10	3rd "B" (Druha Liha)	4	26	15	6	5	38	23	51	1/16 finals		
2010–11	3rd "B" (Druha Liha)	4	22	10	7	5	32	18	37	1/16 finals		
2011–12	3rd "B" (Druha Liha)	6	26	15	3	8	34	19	48	1/8 finals		
2012–13	3rd "B" (Druha Liha)	8	24	10	3	11	47	30	33	1/16 finals		qualified for Group 4
2012–13	3rd "B" (Druha Liha)	2	8	5	1	2	16	10	16	1/16 finals		Relegation group 4
2013–14	3rd "B" (Druha Liha)	2	36	23	8	5	81	32	77	1/16 finals		Promoted
2014–15	2nd (Persha Liha)	2	30	17	9	4	45	21	60	1/8 finals		Promoted
2015–16	1st (Premier Liha)	8	26	7	8	11	22	31	29	1/4 finals		
2016–17	1st (Premier Liha)	8	32	11	8	13	27	31	41	1/8 finals		
2017–18	1st (Premier Liha)	12	32	6	8	18	23	44	26	1/8 finals		Relegated and withdrew
Feniks

== See also ==
- SC Prometei Dniprodzerzhynsk
- FC Prometei Dniprodzerzhynsk
