= FC Metalurh Donetsk =

Metalurh Donetsk
- Full name: Football Club Metalurh Donetsk
- Nickname: Methadone (MetaDon)
- Founded: 17 June 1996; 30 years ago
- Dissolved: 10 July 2015
- Ground: Metalurh Stadium (until 2014); Obolon Arena (2014–15 season; due to war in Donbas)
- Capacity: 5,094
- President: Serhiy Taruta
- League: Ukrainian Premier League
- 2014–15: 10th
- Website: metallurg.donetsk.ua (archived)
Home colours	Away colours

Football Club Metalurh Donetsk (Ukrainian: Футбо́льний клуб «Металу́рг» Доне́цьк, pronounced [metɐˈlurɦ doˈnɛtsʲk]) was a Ukrainian professional football club based in Donetsk. It went bankrupt in July 2015.

== History ==
=== Club predecessor ===
Football came to the Donetsk region in the time of the Russian Empire when the industrialization of the country began. Numerous foreigners, particularly British workers, were forming their own football teams. In September 1911, at the factory of Novorossiysk Association (currently the Donetsk Steel Works Factory – DMZ) owned by John Hughes has created the Yuzovka Sports Society (YuSO) which contained a football club as well. The football club became one of the founders of the Donbas football league based out of Kramatorsk in 1913. The football team existed until 1919 and was liquidated due to the Russian Civil War. In the 1920s, the factory (known at time as Lenin Steel Works) revived the club as part of its own Lenin Sports Club which later carried the name of FC Metalists Stalino. One of the most prominent players of that period was Viktor Shylovsky who later became famous, however, playing for Dynamo Kyiv.

In 1929 based on the team in Stalino (today Donetsk) was created FC Dynamo Stalino. In 1936 based on FC Dynamo Stalino and FC Dynamo Horlivka there was created a united team of Donbas Vuhilnyky Stalino that participated in a spring football championship of 1936 in Group V (precursor of the Soviet Second League). During the season the club moved to Stalino (Donetsk) and changed its name to FC Stakhanovets Stalino.

=== Shakhtar Shakhtarsk ===
Metalurh takes its roots from the Football Club Prometei Shakhtarsk that was allowed to participate on the non-amateur level once Ukraine attained its independence. After a disappointing first season in the Second League, in the 1993 season Promotei placed fifth in the Third League and was promoted back to the Second League when the third place Antratsyt withdrew from competitions. Due to being sponsored by a Medita health clinic of Oleksandr Opryshchenko, in 1993 the club was renamed as Medita Shakhtarsk. However, in 1995 the club's owner was killed and Promotei returned under ownership of the state coal-mining company "Shakhtarantratsyt" under the name of Shakhtar Shakhtarsk.

=== Metalurh Donetsk ===
In 1996 a team of the Donetsk Metallurgical Factory replaced the insolvent FC Shakhtar Shakhtarsk during the 1995–96 season under the name of Shakhtar. In summer 1996 the Donetsk Regional Football Federation agreed to hand over the Shakhtar's past season achievements to the newly formed and already widely accepted Football Club Metalurh Donetsk. After placing second in the Druha Liha Group C, the club gained the promotion to the Persha Liha. In the next season, 1996–97, Metalurh won the Persha Liha championship and were promoted to the Vyscha Liha.

The club successfully started in the Top League and also improved significantly at the domestic Cup competition. Metalurh has obtained a few bronze medals in the league and since 1998 made through to at least the quarter-finals of the Ukrainian Cup. The club financially struggled between 1999 and 2001 being kept afloat by individual efforts of Mykhailo Lyashko and Vladyslav Helzin, who both in 2001 decided to create their own club (see FC Olimpik Donetsk).

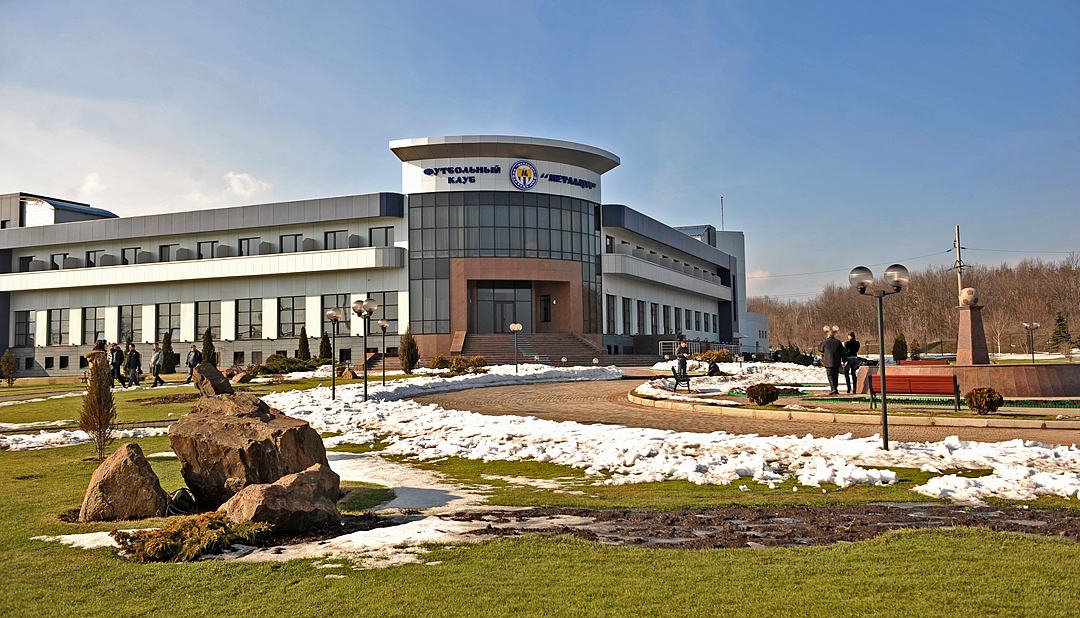
Metalurh Training Center, Avdotine 47°55′59.03″N 37°48′59.74″E

In 2001 Metalurh was purchased by ISD, Ukrainian industrial corporation owned by Serhiy Taruta, one of the most wealthy businessmen in Ukraine and Europe. Throughout majority of the first decade of the new millennium, Metalurh's owners developed a close working relationship with well-known Ukrainian agent Dmytro Sylyuk, who soon became club's acting chairman and who gained much bad publicity for bringing so many foreign players into the club that they outnumbered domestic players. Many were brought in without the manager's consent, and were given overly generous pay, among them Yaya Touré, Andrés Mendoza, and Jordi Cruyff. Furthermore, while working with Metalurh, Selyuk lived in Barcelona and was a rare visitor to Ukraine. After Sylyuk's questionable signings, he was dismissed from his position and the majority of the players brought in by him also left. It later appeared that many of them had contracts with Sylyuk and not directly with the club.

After the era of Sylyuk ended, Metalurh's performance declined and a hunt for medals turned into a struggle for survival. However, in 2008, Bulgarian specialist Nikolay Kostov was brought in to rebuild the team. In his first season with the club, Kostov turned Metalurh's performance around and the club finished fourth in the league, which won them a spot in newly formed UEFA Europa League.

=== Bankruptcy and merger ===
Because of the war situation in the East Ukraine, on 17 June 2015, the Industrial Union of Donbas decided to merge both its clubs FC Metalurh Donetsk and FC Stal Kamianske. The new club was to be primarily based on the Kamianske team and to continue its participation under the name of FC Stal Kamianske. A number of Metalurh players, including Đorđe Lazić, Gabriel Araújo Carvalho, and Oleksandr Bandura, as well as members of the club's staff, such as Erik van der Meer and Vardan Israeltian, moved to Stal. However, on 11 July 2015 Metalurh declared bankruptcy, citing the economic difficulties caused by the fighting, although FC Stal Kamianske did indeed take its place in the Ukrainian Premier League.

== Stadium ==
Metalurh has its own small stadium named after the club, Metalurh Stadium. For most domestic matches the club played at this stadium, which has a capacity barely in excess of 5,000. For games expected to draw a significantly larger crowd, Metalurh played at Shakhtar Stadium, owned by Shakhtar Donetsk, and mostly used for European competitions. A new stadium for Metalurh with a capacity of 17,500 was planned to be built in Makiivka, near Donetsk.

In the 2014–15 season, the club played their home games at Obolon Arena in Kyiv due to the war in Donbas.

== Rivalry ==
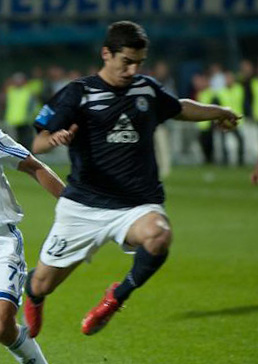
Henrikh Mkhitaryan playing for Metalurh. He later joined their rivals Shakhtar Donetsk

Metalurh's top rival is the neighboring club, and one of Ukraine's most successful teams, Shakhtar Donetsk. The two clubs have not only had a close history since the formation of Metalurh, but Metalurh has also played home games at Shakhtar's former venue, Shakhtar Stadium. The games between the two clubs have been dubbed by the fans and the media as the Donbas Derby. Shakhtar has been dominant in the rivalry from 1996 to 2006, winning all 18 matches between them.

== Honours ==
- Ukrainian First League
  - Champions (1): 1996–97
- National Cup
  - Runners-up (2): 2009–10, 2011–12
- Super Cup
  - Runners-up (1): 2011–12

== Football kits and sponsors ==
Years	Football kit	Shirt sponsor
2000–2001	Umbro	РУТЕКС
2001–2002	Lotto	–
2001–2002	Umbro	ИСД
2002–2003	Adidas	ИСД
2003–2007	Lotto	ИСД
2007–2009	Puma	ИСД
2009–2014	Umbro	ИСД

== League and Cup history ==
Information since Ukrainian independence

Season	Div.	Pos.	Pl.	W	D	L	GS	GA	P	Domestic Cup	Europe		Notes
1995–96	3rd	2	38	24	7	7	53	27	94	1/32 finals			Promoted (in first half as Shakhtar Shakhtarsk)
1996–97	2nd	1	46	32	5	9	77	39	101	1/16 finals			Promoted
1997–98	1st	6	30	11	7	12	28	27	40	Semi-finals			
1998–99	1st	14	30	7	7	16	27	51	28	¼ finals			
1999–00	1st	7	30	11	10	9	39	35	43	¼ finals			
2000–01	1st	5	26	11	9	6	30	24	42	Semi-finals			
2001–02	1st	3	26	12	6	8	38	28	42	Semi-finals			
2002–03	1st	3	30	18	6	6	44	26	60	¼ finals	UC	1R	Lost to (Germany) Werder Bremen 10–2
2003–04	1st	4	30	14	10	6	51	34	52	¼ finals	UC	1R	Lost to (Italy) Parma 4–1
2004–05	1st	3	30	14	7	9	38	35	49	¼ finals	UC	1R	Lost to (Italy) Lazio 6–0
2005–06	1st	9	30	10	9	11	35	35	39	Semi-finals	UC	1R	Lost to (Greece) PAOK 3–3 (away goal)
2006–07	1st	9	30	9	9	12	26	35	36	¼ finals			
2007–08	1st	12	30	6	13	11	34	39	31	Semi-finals			
2008–09	1st	4	30	14	7	9	36	27	49	¼ finals			
2009–10	1st	8	30	11	7	12	41	33	40	Runners Up	EL	Play-off round	Lost to Austria Vienna 5–4 (aet)
2010–11	1st	8	30	11	5	14	36	45	38	1/16 finals			
2011–12	1st	7	30	12	6	12	35	34	42	Runners Up			
2012–13	1st	5	30	14	7	9	45	35	49	1/16 finals	EL	3rd qual. round	Lost to (Norway) Tromsø 2–1
2013–14	1st	6	28	12	7	9	45	42	43	1/16 finals	EL	3rd qual. round	Lost to (Albania) Kukësi 2–1
2014–15	1st	10	26	6	10	10	27	38	22	1/16 finals			Excluded from European competitions, −6 points

== FC Metalurh Donetsk in European Competition ==
Metalurh Donetsk made its debut in European tournaments at the 2002–03 UEFA Cup, losing in the first round to Werder Bremen. The club has been back to the UEFA Cup/UEFA Europa League a total of seven times, the most successful being a run to the playoff round of the 2009–10 UEFA Europa League.

Season	Competition	Round	Club	Home	Away	Aggregate
2002–03	UEFA Cup	First round	(Germany) Werder Bremen	2–2	0–8	2–10
2003–04	UEFA Cup	First Round	(Italy) Parma F.C.	1–1	0–3	1–4
2004–05	UEFA Cup	Second Qualifying Round	(Moldova) FC Tiraspol	3–0	2–1	5–1
2004–05	UEFA Cup	First Round	(Italy) S.S. Lazio	0–3	0–3	0–6
2005–06	UEFA Cup	Second Qualifying Round	(Hungary) FC Sopron	2–1	3–0	5–1
2005–06	UEFA Cup	First Round	(Greece) PAOK	2–2	1–1	3–3 (a)
2009–10	UEFA Europa League	Second Qualifying Round	(Belarus) MTZ-RIPO Minsk	3–0	2–1	5–1
2009–10	UEFA Europa League	Third Qualifying Round	(Slovenia) NK Interblock	2–0	3–0	5–0
2009–10	UEFA Europa League	Playoff Round	FK Austria Wien	2–2	2–3 (a.e.t.)	4–5
2012–13	UEFA Europa League	Second Qualifying Round	(Montenegro) FK Čelik Nikšić	7–0	4–2	11–2
2012–13	UEFA Europa League	Third Qualifying Round	(Norway) Tromsø IL	0–1	1–1	1–2
2013–14	UEFA Europa League	Third Qualifying Round	(Albania) FK Kukësi	1–0	0–2	1–2

=== UEFA club coefficient ranking ===
As of 06.06.2015 (no ranking since 2015), Source:

Rank	Team	Points
158	(Turkey) Konyaspor	7.980
159	(Ukraine) FC Oleksandriya	10.575
160	(Ukraine) FC Metalurh Donetsk	7.786
161	(Portugal) C.S. Marítimo	7.783
162	(Azerbaijan) Gabala FK	7.650

== Presidents and other officials ==
=== Presidents ===
- 1996 – 1999 Oleksandr Kosevych (president of Harant Donetsk (1992–1996))
- 1999 – 2001 Mykhailo Lyashko
- 2001 – 2015 Serhiy Taruta

=== Vice-presidents ===
- 1996 – 1999 Yevhen Kanana
- 1999 Mykhailo Kosevych (brother of Oleksandr Kosevych)
- 1999 – 2001 Vladyslav Helzin
- 2001 – 2002 Vardan Israelian
- 2003 – 2008 Dmitriy Selyuk

=== General directors ===
- 2001 – 2005 Yuriy Hriadushchiy
- 2005 – 2015 Yevhen Haiduk

=== Sports directors ===
- 2002 – 2015 Vardan Israelian

== Managers ==
- (Ukraine) Yevhen Korol (1996–97)
- (Ukraine) Volodymyr Onyshchenko (1997–98)
- (Ukraine) Volodymyr Havrylov (1998)
- (Ukraine) Ihor Yavorskyi (1999)
- (Ukraine) Semen Altman (6 Aug 1999 – 31 Dec 2002)
- (Ukraine) Oleksandr Sevidov (1 Jan 2003 – 29 July 2003)
- (Netherlands) Wim Vrösch (interim) (2003–04)
- (Netherlands) Ton Caanen (1 Jan 2004 – 30 June 2004)
- (Serbia) Slavoljub Muslin (1 July 2004 – 11 March 2005)
- (Ukraine) Vitaliy Shevchenko (interim) (11 March 2005 – 22 June 2005)
- (Ukraine) Oleksandr Sevidov (1 July 2005 – 13 March 2006)
- (Ukraine) Stepan Matviyiv (14 March 2006 – 30 June 2006)
- (Spain) Pichi Alonso (2006)
- (Netherlands) Co Adriaanse (12 Oct 2006 – 17 May 2007)
- (Belgium) Jos Daerden (18 May 2007 – 3 Dec 2007)
- (Ukraine) Serhiy Yashchenko (interim) (7 Dec 2007 – 8 April 2008)
- (Bulgaria) Nikolay Kostov (8 April 2008 – 13 Nov 2010)
- (Russia) Andrei Gordeyev (12 Jan 2011 – 3 May 2011)
- (Ukraine) Volodymyr Pyatenko (interim) (6 May 2011 – 23 Aug 2012)
- (Ukraine) Yuriy Maksymov (23 Aug 2012 – 7 Aug 2013)
- (Russia) Sergei Tashuyev (7 Aug 2013 – 22 May 2014)
- (Ukraine) Volodymyr Pyatenko (16 June 2014 – 20 June 2015)

== See also ==
- FC Metalurh Donetsk Reserves and Youth Team
