= 2016–17 FC Zirka Kropyvnytskyi season =

Zirka Kropyvnytskyi
2016-17 season
- President: Maksym Berezkin
- Manager: Dario Hernan Drudi (until 15 November 2016); Roman Monaryov (from 15 November 2016)
- Stadium: Zirka Stadium
- Ukrainian Premier League: 9th
- Ukrainian Cup: Round of 20 (1/16)
- Top goalscorer: League: Ihor Zahalskyi (4); All: Ihor Zahalskyi (4)
Home colours	Away colours

The 2016–17 season was 7th season in the top Ukrainian football league for Zirka Kropyvnytskyi. Zirka competed in Premier League and in the Ukrainian Cup.

== Players ==
=== Squad information ===
Squad no.	Name	Nationality	Position	Date of birth (age)
Goalkeepers
41	Roman Lyopka ^{List B}	(Ukraine)	GK	26 January 1997 (aged 29)
44	Yevhen Past	(Ukraine)	GK	16 March 1988 (aged 37)
Defenders
4	Federico Pereyra	(Argentina)	DF	4 January 1989 (aged 37)
5	Nailson ^{List B} (on loan from F.C. Famalicão)	(Brazil)	DF	24 February 1994 (aged 31)
13	Oleksandr Zozulya ^{List B}	(Ukraine)	DF	11 April 1996 (aged 29)
18	Oleksandr Kucherenko	(Moldova) (Ukraine)	DF	1 October 1991 (aged 34)
20	Dmytro Fatyeyev	(Ukraine)	DF	21 June 1994 (aged 31)
23	Oleksandr Matkobozhyk ^{List B}	(Ukraine)	DF	3 January 1998 (aged 19)
31	Ihor Chenakal ^{List B}	(Ukraine)	DF	25 April 1997 (aged 28)
55	Maksym Kovalyov	(Ukraine)	DF	20 March 1989 (aged 36)
Midfielders
7	Maksym Drachenko	(Ukraine)	MF	28 January 1990 (aged 27)
8	Vladyslav Lupashko (Captain)	(Ukraine)	MF	4 December 1986 (aged 30)
9	Artem Schedryi	(Ukraine)	MF	9 November 1992 (aged 24)
11	Andriy Batsula	(Ukraine)	MF	6 February 1992 (aged 25)
14	Artem Sitalo	(Ukraine)	MF	1 August 1989 (aged 27)
17	Bruno Vieira de Souza ^{List B}	(Brazil)	MF	12 August 1997 (aged 19)
21	Ihor Zahalskyi	(Ukraine)	MF	19 May 1991 (aged 26)
22	Yevhen Vekhliak ^{List B}	(Ukraine)	MF	8 May 1998 (aged 19)
26	Dmytro Bilonoh ^{List B} (on loan from Ural Yekaterinburg)	(Ukraine)	MF	26 May 1995 (aged 22)
27	Kyrylo Dryshlyuk ^{List B}	(Ukraine)	MF	16 September 1999 (aged 17)
28	Pavlo Polehenko	(Ukraine)	MF	6 January 1995 (aged 22)
81	Denys Sidelnyk ^{List B}	(Ukraine)	MF	5 June 1995 (aged 22)
85	Serhiy Kernozhytskyi ^{List B}	(Ukraine)	MF	23 June 1997 (aged 20)
95	Roman Popov ^{List B}	(Ukraine)	MF	29 June 1995 (aged 22)
99	Mykyta Zhukov ^{List B} (on loan from Inhulets Petrove)	(Ukraine)	MF	19 March 1995 (aged 22)
Forwards
10	Aderinsola Habib Eseola	(Ukraine)	FW	28 June 1991 (aged 26)
15	Oleksiy Zbun ^{List B}	(Ukraine)	FW	9 June 1997 (aged 20)
29	Maksym Pryadun ^{List B}	(Ukraine)	FW	17 February 1997 (aged 20)
50	Oleksandr Akymenko	(Ukraine)	FW	5 September 1985 (aged 31)
77	Oleksiy Chychykov	(Ukraine)	FW	30 September 1987 (aged 29)

== Transfers ==
=== In ===
Date	Pos.	Player	Age	Moving from	Type	Fee	Source
Summer
26 June 2016	DF	(Ukraine) Volodymyr Bayenko	26	(Ukraine) Hirnyk Kryvyi Rih	Transfer	Undisclosed	
26 June 2016	FW	(Ukraine) Artem Sitalo	27	(Ukraine) Hirnyk Kryvyi Rih	Transfer	Undisclosed	
27 June 2016	GK	(Ukraine) Hennadiy Hanyev	26	(Ukraine) Hirnyk Kryvyi Rih	Transfer	Undisclosed	
27 June 2016	MF	(Ukraine) Vitaliy Havrysh	30	(Ukraine) Hoverla Uzhhorod	Transfer	Undisclosed	
31 August 2016	DF	(Argentina) Federico Pereyra	27	(Bolivia) The Strongest	Transfer	Undisclosed	
7 September 2016	MF	(Ukraine) Artem Favorov	22	(Ukraine) Obolon-Brovar	Transfer	Free	
9 September 2016	DF	(Spain) Borja Ekiza	28	(Spain) SD Eibar	Transfer	Free	
9 September 2016	DF	(Spain) Aitor	30	(Spain) Real Avilés	Transfer	Free	
16 September 2016	DF	(Ukraine) Pavlo Polehenko	21	(Ukraine) Dynamo Kyiv	Transfer	Free	
24 September 2016	MF	(Ukraine) Ihor Kalinin	20	Unattached	Transfer	Free	
20 July 2016	MF	(Ukraine) Yevhen Chumak	21	(Ukraine) Dynamo Kyiv	Loan		
29 July 2016	MF	(Ukraine) Dmytro Bilonoh	21	(Russia) Ural Yekaterinburg	Loan		
31 August 2016	FW	(Costa Rica) Jonathan Moya	24	(Costa Rica) Saprissa	Loan		
Winter
20 January 2017	MF	(Brazil) Bruninho	19	(Brazil) Sobradinho	Transfer	Undisclosed	
30 January 2017	FW	(Ukraine) Aderinsola Habib Eseola	25	(Ukraine) Arsenal Kyiv	Transfer	Undisclosed	
21 February 2017	MF	(Ukraine) Maksym Drachenko	27	(Ukraine) Olimpik Donetsk	Transfer	Free	
February 2017	MF	(Ukraine) Mykyta Zhukov	21	(Ukraine) Inhulets Petrove	Loan		
2 March 2017	DF	(Brazil) Nailson	23	(Portugal) Famalicão	Loan		

=== Out ===
Date	Pos.	Player	Age	Moving to	Type	Fee	Source
Summer
7 July 2016	MF	(Ukraine) Borys Baranets	30	(Ukraine) Rukh Vynnyky	Transfer	Undisclosed	
7 July 2016	MF	(Ukraine) Hryhoriy Baranets	30	(Ukraine) Rukh Vynnyky	Transfer	Undisclosed	
8 July 2016	MF	(Ukraine) Andriy Mostovyi	28	(Ukraine) Desna Chernihiv	Transfer	Undisclosed	
21 July 2016	GK	(Ukraine) Pavlo Poshtarenko	25	(Ukraine) Obolon-Brovar	Transfer	Undisclosed	
3 August 2016	FW	(Ukraine) Oleksandr Derebchynsky	25	Unattached	Transfer	Free	
12 August 2016	DF	(Ukraine) Oleh Dopilka	30	Unattached	Transfer	Free	
29 September 2016	MF	(Ukraine) Vitaliy Havrysh	30	(Ukraine) Kolos Kovalivka	Transfer	Free	
31 August 2016	MF	(Ukraine) Yevhen Chumak	21	(Ukraine) Dynamo Kyiv	Loan return		
Winter
9 December 2016	GK	(Ukraine) Hennadiy Hanyev	26	(Ukraine) Inhulets Petrove	Transfer	Free	
22 December 2016	MF	(Ukraine) Oleksandr Kochura	30	Retired	Transfer	Free	
25 January 2017	DF	(Ukraine) Yarema Kavatsiv	30	(Ukraine) Veres Rivne	Transfer	Free	
29 January 2017	DF	(Spain) Aitor	30	(Spain) Extremadura UD	Transfer	Free	
12 February 2017	DF	(Ukraine) Volodymyr Bayenko	26	(Uzbekistan) FK Buxoro	Transfer	Free	
25 February 2017	MF	(Ukraine) Ihor Kalinin	21	(Russia) Volgar Astrakhan	Transfer	Free	
9 March 2017	FW	(Ukraine) Roman Loktionov	30	(Belarus) Neman Grodno	Transfer	Free	
9 March 2017	MF	(Ukraine) Ruslan Zubkov	25	(Belarus) Neman Grodno	Transfer	Free	
8 May 2017	MF	(Spain) Borja Ekiza	29	Unattached	Transfer	Free	
2 February 2017	FW	(Costa Rica) Jonathan Moya	24	(Costa Rica) Saprissa	Loan return		
22 January 2017	FW	(Ukraine) Artem Favorov	22	(Denmark) Vejle Boldklub	Loan		

== Pre-season and friendlies ==
25 June 2016 Friendly	Zirka Kropyvnytskyi (Ukraine)	1–0	(Ukraine) Inhulets Petrove	Kropyvnytskyi
17:00 EEST (UTC+03:00)	47'	Report		Stadium: Zirka Stadium; Attendance: 350; Referee: Viktor Kopiyevskyi

27 June 2016 Friendly	Cherkaskyi Dnipro (Ukraine)	1–2	(Ukraine) Zirka Kropyvnytskyi	Cherkasy
18:00 EEST (UTC+03:00)	Kachur 68'	Report	Sitalo 22'; Schedryi 31'	Stadium: Tsentralnyi Stadion; Attendance: 50; Referee: Yuriy Foschiy

3 July 2016 Friendly	Skala Stryi (Ukraine)	1–1	(Ukraine) Zirka Kropyvnytskyi	Kamianytsa
11:00 EEST (UTC+03:00)	Bilala 34'	Report	Havrysh 15'	Stadium: "GSC Kamelot" Stadium; Attendance: 50

6 July 2016 Friendly	Zirka Kropyvnytskyi (Ukraine)	3–0	(Slovakia) Košice	Kamianytsa
17:00 EEST (UTC+03:00)	Bayenko 12'; Chychykov 33'; Zahalskyi 77'	Report		Stadium: "GSC Kamelot" Stadium; Attendance: 50

9 July 2016 Friendly	Veres Rivne (Ukraine)	0–0	(Ukraine) Zirka Kropyvnytskyi	Kamianytsa
17:00 EEST (UTC+03:00)		Report		Stadium: "GSC Kamelot" Stadium; Attendance: 50

13 July 2016 Friendly	Balmazújvárosi FC (Hungary)	0–1	(Ukraine) Zirka Kropyvnytskyi	Kamianytsa
17:00 EEST (UTC+03:00)		Report	Batsula 24'	Stadium: "GSC Kamelot" Stadium; Attendance: 50

2 September 2016 Friendly	Zirka Kropyvnytskyi (Ukraine)	2–0	(Ukraine) Desna Chernihiv	Kharkiv
17:00 EEST (UTC+03:00)	6'; 47'	Report

5 September 2016 Friendly	Zirka Kropyvnytskyi (Ukraine)	6–0	(Ukraine) Metalurh Zaporizhya	Kharkiv
17:00 EEST (UTC+03:00)	Zahalskyi 48'; Sitalo 68'; Schedryi 79'; Chychykov 85'	Report

7 September 2016 Friendly	Zirka Kropyvnytskyi (Ukraine)	4–0	(Ukraine) Ankar Kharkiv	Kharkiv
11:00 EEST (UTC+03:00)	Kochura 28'; Moya 38'; Sitalo 65'; Schedryi 71'	Report

12 October 2016 Friendly	Zirka Kropyvnytskyi (Ukraine)	6–0	(Ukraine) Metalurh Zaporizhya	Kropyvnytskyi
15:30 EEST (UTC+03:00)	Sitalo 6'; Moya 21', 51', 79', 89'; Batsula 78'	Report		Stadium: Zirka Stadium; Attendance: 200; Referee: Viktor Kopiyevskyi

13 November 2016 Friendly	Zorya Luhansk (Ukraine)	Cancelled	(Ukraine) Zirka Kropyvnytskyi	Zaporizhia
15:00 EET (UTC+02:00)		Report		Stadium: Torpedo Stadium

16 November 2016 Friendly	Zirka Kropyvnytskyi (Ukraine)	Cancelled	(Ukraine) Metalurh Zaporizhya	Kropyvnytskyi
15:00 EET (UTC+02:00)		Report		Stadium: Zirka Stadium

26 January 2017 Friendly	Astra Giurgiu (Romania)	1–1	(Ukraine) Zirka Kropyvnytskyi	Cyprus
15:00 EET (UTC+02:00)	Gheorghe 62'	Report	Chychykov 65'

26 January 2017 Friendly	Mezőkövesd-Zsóry (Hungary)	1–2	(Ukraine) Zirka Kropyvnytskyi	Paralimni, Cyprus
12:00 EET (UTC+02:00)	Veselinovic 23'	Report	Chychykov 4'; Akymenko 70'	Stadium: Paralimni Stadium; Attendance: 50

1 February 2017 Friendly	Beroe Stara Zagora (Bulgaria)	3–2	(Ukraine) Zirka Kropyvnytskyi	Paralimni, Cyprus
15:00 EET (UTC+02:00)	Mapuku 30'; Tsonev 47', 63'	Report	Polehenko 45'; Batsula 52' (pen.)	Stadium: Paralimni Stadium; Attendance: 50

3 February 2017 Friendly	Wisła Płock (Poland)	Cancelled	(Ukraine) Zirka Kropyvnytskyi	Cyprus
EET (UTC+02:00)		Report

3 February 2017 Friendly	Karmiotissa Pano Polemidia (Cyprus)	1–2	(Ukraine) Zirka Kropyvnytskyi	Pano Polemidia, Cyprus
15:00 EET (UTC+02:00)	30'	Report	Eseola 37'; Batsula 85'	Stadium: Pano Polemidia community stadium Attendance: 100

5 February 2017 Friendly	Gefle IF (Sweden)	2–1	(Ukraine) Zirka Kropyvnytskyi	Ayia Napa, Cyprus
15:00 EET (UTC+02:00)	Oremo 22' (pen.); Lantto 73'	Report	Eseola 87'	Stadium: Municipal stadium Attendance: 50

6 February 2017 Friendly	Partizan (Serbia)	4–0	(Ukraine) Zirka Kropyvnytskyi	Germasogeia, Cyprus
16:00 EET (UTC+02:00)	Janković 37'; Leonardo 54'; Đurđević 58', 64'	Report		Stadium: Municipal stadium

10 February 2017 Friendly	Crvena Zvezda (Serbia)	6–2	(Ukraine) Zirka Kropyvnytskyi	Paphos, Cyprus
14:00 EET (UTC+02:00)	Boakye 8', 45+1', 61'; Plavšić 23', 33'; Milić 82'	Report	Chychykov 42'; Zahalskyi 50'	Attendance: 50

18 February 2017 Friendly	Oberwallis Naters (Switzerland)	0–3	(Ukraine) Zirka Kropyvnytskyi	Paralimni, Cyprus
11:00 EET (UTC+02:00)		Report	Batsula 21', 86' (pen.); Eseola 31'	Stadium: Paralimni Stadium; Attendance: 50

21 February 2017 Friendly	Karmiotissa Pano Polemidia (Cyprus)	0–4	(Ukraine) Zirka Kropyvnytskyi	Pano Polemidia, Cyprus
12:30 EET (UTC+02:00)		Report	Sitalo 10'; Dryshliuk 65'; Akymenko 78'; Zbun 81'	Stadium: Pano Polemidia community stadium

== Competitions ==
=== Overall ===
Competition	Started round	Final position	First match	Last match
Premier League	Matchday 1	9th	22 July 2016	31 May 2017
Cup	Round of 20	Round of 20	21 September 2016	21 September 2016

Last updated:

=== Premier League ===
==== League table ====
Pos	Team	Pld	W	D	L	GF	GA	GD	Pts	Qualification or relegation
7	Vorskla Poltava (Note: Vorskla Poltava was awarded the UPL Prestige Trophy for winning the consolation tournament.)	32	11	9	12	32	32	0	42	
8	Stal Kamianske	32	11	8	13	27	31	−4	41	
9	Zirka Kropyvnytskyi	32	9	7	16	29	43	−14	34	
10	Karpaty Lviv (Note: Karpaty Lviv was deducted six points according to a decision by FIFA Disciplinary Committee on 4 March 2016.)	32	9	9	14	35	41	−6	30	
11	FC Dnipro (Note: FC Dnipro was deducted a total of 24 points (six points by the FIFA Disciplinary Committee for failing to clear their debts with former coach Juande Ramos and his assistants, six points by the Ukrainian Premier League for failing to comply with the decision of FIFA Disciplinary Committee to pay debts to former player Danilo Sousa Campos, three more points by the FFU Control and Disciplinary Committee for failing execute one of the decisions of the committee, and 9 more points on 9 June 2017, after the end of the tournament.). On the decision of FIFA, FFU enforced relegation of FC Dnipro straight to the Second League, skipping the First League. In a near future FFU will adopt a decision which team will be replacing Dnipro in the First League.) (R)	32	8	13	11	31	40	−9	13	Relegation to Ukrainian Second League
12	Volyn Lutsk (Note: Volyn Lutsk was deducted six points on the request of Football Federation of Ukraine which received a letter from the FIFA Disciplinary Committee on 11 May 2017 urging to implement its decision of 15 March 2017, due to debts with former player Saša Stević.) (R)	32	4	4	24	17	51	−34	10	Relegation to Ukrainian First League

Source: UEFA, Ukrainian Premier League, Soccerway
Rules for classification: 1) Points; 2) Goal difference; 3) Goals scored; 4) Head-to-head points; 5) Head-to-head goal difference; 6) Head-to-head goals scored; 7) Draw.
(R) Relegated

==== Results summary ====
Overall								Home						Away					
Pld	W	D	L	GF	GA	GD	Pts	W	D	L	GF	GA	GD	W	D	L	GF	GA	GD
32	9	7	16	29	43	−14	34	7	5	4	18	13	+5	2	2	12	11	30	−19

Last updated: 31 May 2017.
Source: Competitive matches

==== Results by round ====
Round	1	2	3	4	5	6	7	8	9	10	11	12	13	14	15	16	17	18	19	20	21	22	23	24	25	26	27	28	29	30	31	32
Ground	A	H	A	A	H	A	H	A	H	A	H	H	A	H	H	A	H	A	H	A	H	A	A	H	A	A	H	H	A	H	H	A
Result	L	D	L	L	L	L	W	W	D	L	W	L	L	L	W	L	D	W	D	L	W	D	L	W	L	L	W	D	D	W	L	L
Position	7	7	9	11	11	11	11	9	9	9	8	8	9	9	9	9	8	8	8	8	8	9	9	9	9	9	9	9	9	9	9	9

Updated to match(es) played on 31 May 2017. Source: Competitive matches
A = Away; H = Home; W = Win; D = Draw; L = Loss

==== Matches ====
22 July 2016 1	Shakhtar Donetsk	4–1	Zirka Kropyvnytskyi	Lviv
19:00 EEST (UTC+03:00)	Bernard 3'; Taison 32'; Fred (yellow card) 37'; Eduardo 45'; Srna (yellow card) 48'; Kovalyov 70' (o.g.); Stepanenko (yellow card) 84'	Report	Kucherenko (yellow card) 21'; Sitalo 38'; Dopilka (yellow card) 39'; Batsula (yellow card) 44'	Stadium: Arena Lviv; Attendance: 1,536; Referee: Yevhen Aranovskyi

30 July 2016 2	Zirka Kropyvnytskyi	1–1	Zorya Luhansk	Kropyvnytskyi
EEST (UTC+03:00)	Lupashko (yellow card) 67'; Popov (yellow card) 80'; Kucherenko 87' (pen.)	Report	Hordiyenko 73'; Tkachuk (yellow card) 86'; Shevchenko (yellow card) 89'	Stadium: Zirka Stadium; Attendance: 6,188; Referee: Dmytro Kutakov

7 August 2016 3	Olimpik Donetsk	4–2	Zirka Kropyvnytskyi	Kropyvnytskyi
17:00 EEST (UTC+03:00)	Oliynyk (yellow card) 11'; Shestakov (yellow card) 45+1', (goal) 59'; Matyazh 53'; Postupalenko 73', (yellow card) 73'; Kornyev 87'	Report	Popov (yellow card) 28'; Lupashko 69'; Zahalskyi 90+3'	Stadium: Zirka Stadium; Attendance: 3,988; Referee: Dmytro Kutakov

13 August 2016 4	Volyn Lutsk	1–0	Zirka Kropyvnytskyi	Lutsk
17:00 EEST (UTC+03:00)	Khomchenko (yellow card) 40'; Bayenko 73' (o.g.)	Report	Havrysh (yellow card) 49'; Batsula (yellow card) 90+2'	Stadium: Avanhard Stadium; Attendance: 2,100; Referee: Yuriy Mozharovsky

21 August 2016 5	Zirka Kropyvnytskyi	0–1	Chornomorets Odesa	Kropyvnytskyi
19:30 EEST (UTC+03:00)	Havrysh (yellow card) 81'	Report	Khocholava (yellow card) 3', (goal) 40'; Filimonov (yellow card) 41'; Martynenko (yellow card) 85'; Borovyk (yellow card) 90+3'; Tatarkov (yellow card) 90+4'	Stadium: Zirka Stadium; Attendance: 4,619; Referee: Anatoliy Zhabchenko

28 August 2016 6	FC Oleksandriya	4–0	Zirka Kropyvnytskyi	Oleksandriya
17:00 EEST (UTC+03:00)	Chorniy 15', (yellow card) 38'; Hitchenko (yellow card) 45+1', (goal) 63'; Hrytsuk 70'; Tsurikov (yellow card) 82'; Ponomar 90'	Report	Lupashko (yellow card) 14'; Zubkov (yellow card) 82'	Stadium: CSC Nika; Attendance: 2,552; Referee: Oleksandr Holovkov

11 September 7	Zirka Kropyvnytskyi	1–0	Karpaty Lviv	Kropyvnytskyi
14:00 EEST (UTC+03:00)	Zubkov (yellow card) 88'; Bayenko (yellow card) 54'; Favorov 81' (pen.)	Report	Ksyonz (yellow card) 27'; Novotryasov (yellow card) 79' (yellow-red card) 90+6'; Nesterov (yellow card) 88'; Kostevych (yellow card) 90'; Rudyka (yellow card) 90+5'; Pidkivka (yellow card) 90+6'	Stadium: Zirka Stadium; Attendance: 4,207; Referee: Ihor Paskhal

17 September 2016 8	Dnipro	0–1	Zirka Kropyvnytskyi	Dnipro
19:30 EEST (UTC+03:00)	Vakulko (yellow card) 45+1'; Rotan (yellow card) 86'	Report	Pereyra (yellow card) 52'; Favorov (yellow card) 74'; Moya (yellow card) 85', (goal) 90+4'; Borja Ekiza (yellow card) 88'	Stadium: Dnipro-Arena; Attendance: 5,113; Referee: Yuriy Hryso

25 September 2016 9	Zirka Kropyvnytskyi	0–0	Stal Kamianske	Kropyvnytskyi
17:00 EEST (UTC+03:00)	Chychykov (yellow card) 40'	Report	Kravchenko (yellow card) 46'; Zaderaka (yellow card) 58'; Pashayev (yellow card) 66'; Karasyuk (yellow card) 90+1'	Stadium: Zirka Stadium; Referee: Ivan Bondar

2 October 2016 10	Dynamo Kyiv	2–0	Zirka Kropyvnytskyi	Kyiv
19:30 EEST (UTC+03:00)	Sydorchuk 20'; Tsyhankov 57'	Report	Pereyra (yellow card) 20'; Moya (yellow card) 25'; Kochura (yellow card) 54'; Bayenko (yellow card) 55'; Borja Ekiza (yellow card) 56'; Favorov (yellow card) 71'	Stadium: NSC Olimpiyskiy; Attendance: 7,025; Referee: Olexandr Ivanov

16 October 2016 11	Zirka Kropyvnytskyi	2–0	Vorskla Poltava	Kropyvnytskyi
17:00 EEST (UTC+03:00)	Federico Hernán Pereyra (yellow card) 26'; Moya 51', (yellow card) 62'; Popov 79', (yellow card) 79'	Report	Bartulović (yellow card) 37'; Dytyatev (yellow card) 55'; Perduta (yellow card) 59'; Holodyuk (yellow card) 90+3'	Stadium: Zirka Stadium; Attendance: 2,775; Referee: Serhiy Berezka

23 October 2016 12	Zirka Kropyvnytskyi	0–3	Shakhtar Donetsk	Kropyvnytskyi
19:30 EEST (UTC+03:00)	Moya (yellow card) 31'; Kovalyov (yellow card) 42'; Bayenko (yellow card) 44'; Kucherenko (yellow card) 79'; Sitalo (yellow card) 84'	Report	Fred (yellow card) 29'; Pereyra 35' (o.g.); Boryachuk (yellow card) 40' (goal) 73'; Malyshev (yellow card) 51'; Ferreyra 90'; Rakitskiy (yellow card) 90+4'; Bernard (yellow card) 90+4'	Stadium: Zirka Stadium; Attendance: 8,056; Referee: Anatoliy Zhabchenko

30 October 2016 13	Zorya Luhansk	2–1	Zirka Kropyvnytskyi	Zaporizhia
14:00 EET (UTC+02:00)	Petryak 15'; Kharatin (yellow card) 26'; Chaykovskyi (yellow card) 28'; Kulach 60'	Report	Kucherenko (yellow card) 25'; Artem Favorov (yellow card) 63'; Zahalskyi 90+1' (pen.)	Stadium: Slavutych-Arena; Attendance: 800; Referee: Anatoliy Abdula

5 November 2016 14	Zirka Kropyvnytskyi	1–2	Olimpik Donetsk	Kropyvnytskyi
14:00 EET (UTC+02:00)	Sitalo (yellow card) 41'; Favorov 45'; Bayenko (yellow card) 52'; Schedryi (yellow card) 60'; Kalinin (yellow card) 63'; Moya (yellow card) 71'; Kovalyov (yellow card) 76'	Report	Doronin (yellow card) 46'; Petrov 77'; Postupalenko (yellow card) 80', (goal) 82'; Fedoriv (yellow card) 90+4'	Stadium: Zirka Stadium; Attendance: 1,669; Referee: Ivan Bondar

20 November 2016 15	Zirka Kropyvnytskyi	2–0	Volyn Lutsk	Kropyvnytskyi
17:00 EET (UTC+02:00)	Favorov 59'; Bilonoh 73'	Report	Petrov (yellow card) 2'; Didenko (yellow card) 36'; Shapoval (yellow card) 70'; Shandruk (yellow card) 83'	Stadium: Zirka Stadium; Attendance: 1,554; Referee: Yaroslav Kozyk

26 November 2016 16	Chornomorets Odesa	2–1	Zirka Kropyvnytskyi	Odesa
14:00 EET (UTC+02:00)	Filimonov (yellow card) 8'; Korkishko 25'; Danchenko (yellow card) 76'; Andriyevskyi 78'; Smirnov (yellow card) 90'	Report	Bilonoh 3'; Batsula (yellow card) 29'; Zahalskyi (yellow card) 37'; Sitalo (yellow card) 41'; Zubkov (yellow card) 77' (yellow-red card) 84'	Stadium: Chornomorets Stadium; Attendance: 3,100; Referee: Dmytro Kutakov

3 December 2016 17	Zirka Kropyvnytskyi	1–1	FC Oleksandriya	Zaporizhia
19:30 EET (UTC+02:00)	Pereyra (yellow card) 21'; Borja Ekiza (yellow card) 35'; Batsula 90+3'	Report	Shendrik 26'; Kozak (yellow card) 45+1'; Novak (yellow card) 62'; Chebotayev (yellow card) 86'	Stadium: Slavutych-Arena; Attendance: 253; Referee: Anatoliy Abdula

11 December 2016 18	Karpaty Lviv	2–3	Zirka Kropyvnytskyi	Lviv
14:00 EET (UTC+02:00)	Blanco Leschuk 6', (yellow card) 44'; Klyots (yellow card) 55'; Chachua 70'; Nesterov (yellow card) 73'; Khudobyak (yellow card) 77'; Hrysyo (yellow card) 90+1'	Report	Batsula 30'; Lupashko (yellow card) 62'; Pereyra 69'; Kucherenko 74'; Zahalskyi (yellow card) 77'; Bilonoh (yellow card) 90'; Past (yellow card) 90+4'	Stadium: Arena Lviv; Attendance: 1,573; Referee: Oleksandr Derdo

25 February 2017 19	Zirka Kropyvnytskyi	1–1	Dnipro Dnipropetrovsk	Kropyvnytskyi
14:00 EET (UTC+02:00)	Sitalo 11'; Drachenko (yellow card) 58'	Report	Lopyryonok (yellow card) 16'; Rotan 42', (yellow card) 81'; Vakulko (yellow card) 57' (yellow-red card) 89'; Dovbyk (yellow card) 67'; Kocherhin (yellow card) 68'; Lunyov (yellow card) 84'	Stadium: Zirka Stadium; Attendance: 2,771; Referee: Ihor Paskhal

4 March 2017 20	Stal Kamianske	3–0	Zirka Kropyvnytskyi	Dnipro
19:30 EET (UTC+02:00)	Ischenko (yellow card) 17' da Silva (yellow card) 44'; Karasyuk 49'; Vasin 73' (pen.); Debelko 85'	Report	Kucherenko (yellow card) 32'; Nailson (yellow card) 80'	Stadium: Meteor Stadium; Attendance: 300; Referee: Kateryna Monzul

12 March 2017 21	Zirka Kropyvnytskyi	2–0	Dynamo Kyiv	Kropyvnytskyi
14:00 EEST (UTC+03:00)	Eseola (yellow card) 6'; Batsula 33'; Polehenko 71'; Bilonoh (yellow card) 90'	Report	Rybalka (yellow card) 26'; Kádár (yellow card) 33'; Harmash (yellow card) 60'	Stadium: Zirka Stadium; Attendance: 7,933; Referee: Yaroslav Kozyk

18 March 2017 22	Vorskla Poltava	0–0	Zirka Kropyvnytskyi	Poltava
19:00 EET (UTC+02:00)	Chesnakov (yellow card) 24'; Zahorulko (yellow card) 49'; Perduta (yellow card) 59'; Chyzhov (yellow card) 69'	Report	Drachenko (yellow card) 54'; Chychykov (yellow card) 60'	Stadium: Vorskla Stadium; Attendance: 1,030; Referee: Vitaliy Romanov

1 April 2017 23	Dnipro	1–0	Zirka Kropyvnytskyi	Dnipro
14:00 EEST (UTC+03:00)	Nagiev 33'; Vlad (yellow card) 86'; Kozhushko (red card) 87'	Report	Popov (yellow card) 18'; Batsula (yellow card) 43'; Drachenko (yellow card) 59'; Fatyeyev (yellow card) 87'	Stadium: Dnipro-Arena; Attendance: 2,872; Referee: Mykola Kryvonosov

8 April 2017 24	Zirka Kropyvnytskyi	1–0	Vorskla Poltava	Kropyvnytskyi
17:00 EEST (UTC+03:00)	Borja Ekiza 33'	Report	Sapay (yellow card) 38'; Odaryuk (yellow card) 69'; Sakiv (yellow card) 85'; Perduta (yellow card) 90+1'	Stadium: Zirka Stadium; Attendance: 1,330; Referee: Ivan Bondar

16 April 2017 25	Volyn Lutsk	1–0	Zirka Kropyvnytskyi	Lutsk
14:00 EEST (UTC+03:00)	Roman Nykytyuk (yellow card) 2'; Petrov 32'; Didenko (yellow card) 40'; Zaderetskyi (yellow card) 75'; Chepelyuk (yellow card) 82'; Kychak (yellow card) 90+4'	Report	Bilonoh (yellow card) 48' (yellow-red card) 67'; Zahalskyi (yellow card) 50'; Fatyeyev (yellow card) 90+3'	Stadium: Avanhard Stadium; Attendance: 1,506; Referee: Vitaliy Romanov

22 April 2017 26	Stal Kamianske	1–0	Zirka Kropyvnytskyi	Dnipro
14:00 EEST (UTC+03:00)	Karikari (yellow card) 45+2'; Shabanov (yellow card) 55'; Vasin (yellow card) 58'; Kalenchuk (yellow card) 60'; Edgar Malakyan (yellow card) 61'; Gor Malakyan (yellow card) 63'; Zaderaka (yellow card) 77'; Leandro 82'	Report	Pereyra (yellow card) 25'; Eseola (yellow card) 29' (yellow-red card) 70'; Zhukov (yellow card) 49'; Drachenko (yellow card) 51'	Stadium: Meteor Stadium; Attendance: 445; Referee: Ihor Paskhal

29 April 2017 27	Zirka Kropyvnytskyi	3–2	Karpaty Lviv	Kropyvnytskyi
14:00 EEST (UTC+03:00)	Bilonoh 26'; Zahalskyi 30' (pen.); Dryshlyuk (yellow card) 36'; Drachenko 45'; Fatyeyev (yellow card) 46'; Schedryi (yellow card) 90+3'	Report	Filimonov (yellow card) 6'; Hladkyi 15' (pen.); Hutsulyak 50'; Ksyonz (yellow card) 56'; Dytyatev (red card)	Stadium: Zirka Stadium; Attendance: 2,668; Referee: Serhiy Berezka

7 May 2017 28	Zirka Kropyvnytskyi	1–1	Dnipro	Kropyvnytskyi
17:00 EEST (UTC+03:00)	Pereyra 48'; Zahalskyi (yellow card) 69'; Zbun (yellow card) 81'; Polehenko (yellow card) 89'	Report	Cheberko 7', (yellow card) 37'; Adamyuk (yellow card) 34'; Dovbyk (yellow card) 52'; Svatok (yellow card) 69'; Kocherhin (yellow card) 83'; Lunyov (yellow card) 86'	Stadium: Zirka Stadium; Attendance: 4,110; Referee: Dmytro Kutakov

14 May 2017 29	Vorskla Poltava	1–1	Zirka Kropyvnytskyi	Poltava
14:00 EEST (UTC+03:00)	Chyzhov (yellow card) 18'; Khlyobas 31'; Chesnakov (yellow card) 36'; Myakushko (yellow card) 47'	Report	Pereyra (yellow card) 2'; Dryshlyuk (yellow card) 45+2'; Zahalskyi 73'	Stadium: Vorskla Stadium; Attendance: 725; Referee: Yuriy Hryso

20 May 2017 30	Zirka Kropyvnytskyi	2–0	Volyn Lutsk	Kropyvnytskyi
14:00 EEST (UTC+03:00)	Eseola (yellow card) 21', (goal) 68'; Drachenko (yellow card) 77'; Sitalo 82'	Report	Marushka (yellow card) 42'; Goropevšek (yellow card) 45+1'; Kotyun (yellow card) 45+3'; Ilnytskyi (yellow card) 48'; Lyashenko (yellow card) 56'	Stadium: Zirka Stadium; Attendance: 1,966; Referee: Oleksandr Ivanov

27 May 2017 31	Zirka Kropyvnytskyi	0–1	Stal Kamianske	Kropyvnytskyi
17:00 EEST (UTC+03:00)	Zbun (yellow card) 47'; Pereyra (yellow card) 90+2'	Report	Klymchuk (yellow card) 41'; Zaderaka (yellow card) 62'; Vasin 78'; Kalenchuk (yellow card) 82'; Stamenković (yellow card) 86'	Stadium: Zirka Stadium; Attendance: 2,124; Referee: Mykola Balakin

31 May 2017 32	Karpaty Lviv	2–1	Zirka Kropyvnytskyi	Lviv
17:00 EEST (UTC+03:00)	Nesterov 22'; Ksyonz (yellow card) 65'; Matviyenko 68'; China (yellow card) 70'; Pidkivka (yellow card) 90+1'	Report	Pryadun 29'; Bilonoh (yellow card) 88'	Stadium: Arena Lviv; Attendance: 1,851; Referee: Vitaliy Romanov

=== Ukrainian Cup ===
21 September 2016 Round of 20 (1/16)	FC Poltava	1–0	Zirka Kropyvnytskyi	Poltava
16:00 EEST (UTC+3)	Kovtun 20'; Nedolya (yellow card) 45+1'; Paramonov (yellow card) 58'; Nasibulin (yellow card) 90+3'	Report	Popov (yellow card) 52'; Aitor (yellow card) 62'	Stadium: Lokomotyv Stadium; Attendance: 600; Referee: Volodymyr Mylanych

== Statistics ==
=== Appearances and goals ===
No.	Pos	Nat	Player	Total		Premier League		Cup	
No.	Pos	Nat	Player	Apps	Goals	Apps	Goals	Apps	Goals
Goalkeepers
41	GK	(Ukraine) UKR	Roman Lyopka	3	0	3	0	0	0
44	GK	(Ukraine) UKR	Yevhen Past	28	0	28	0	0	0
Defenders
4	DF	(Argentina) ARG	Federico Pereyra	22	2	22	2	0	0
5	DF	(Brazil) BRA	Nailson	3	0	3	0	0	0
13	DF	(Ukraine) UKR	Oleksandr Zozulya	1	0	0+1	0	0	0
18	DF	(Moldova) MDA	Oleksandr Kucherenko	22	2	20+1	2	1	0
20	DF	(Ukraine) UKR	Dmytro Fatyeyev	15	0	14	0	1	0
23	DF	(Ukraine) UKR	Oleksandr Matkobozhyk	3	0	2+1	0	0	0
55	DF	(Ukraine) UKR	Maksym Kovalyov	13	0	13	0	0	0
Midfielders
7	MF	(Ukraine) UKR	Maksym Drachenko	11	1	11	1	0	0
8	MF	(Ukraine) UKR	Vladyslav Lupashko	18	1	15+2	1	0+1	0
9	MF	(Ukraine) UKR	Artem Schedryi	27	0	17+10	0	0	0
11	MF	(Ukraine) UKR	Andriy Batsula	26	3	26	3	0	0
14	MF	(Ukraine) UKR	Artem Sitalo	30	3	29+1	3	0	0
21	MF	(Ukraine) UKR	Ihor Zahalskyi	28	4	23+5	4	0	0
26	MF	(Ukraine) UKR	Dmytro Bilonoh	16	3	8+8	3	0	0
27	MF	(Ukraine) UKR	Kyrylo Dryshlyuk	7	0	5+2	0	0	0
28	MF	(Ukraine) UKR	Pavlo Polehenko	20	1	15+4	1	1	0
95	MF	(Ukraine) UKR	Roman Popov	14	1	5+8	1	1	0
99	MF	(Ukraine) UKR	Mykyta Zhukov	9	0	4+5	0	0	0
Forwards
10	FW	(Ukraine) UKR	Aderinsola Habib Eseola	10	1	7+3	1	0	0
15	FW	(Ukraine) UKR	Oleksiy Zbun	8	0	6+2	0	0	0
29	FW	(Ukraine) UKR	Maksym Pryadun	3	1	2+1	1	0	0
50	FW	(Ukraine) UKR	Oleksandr Akymenko	8	0	2+6	0	0	0
77	FW	(Ukraine) UKR	Oleksiy Chychykov	17	0	12+4	0	0+1	0
Players transferred out during the season
7	MF	(Ukraine) UKR	Vitaliy Havrysh	6	0	6	0	0	0
7	MF	(Ukraine) UKR	Ihor Kalinin	5	0	2+3	0	0	0
10	DF	(Ukraine) UKR	Oleh Dopilka	2	0	2	0	0	0
10	FW	(Ukraine) UKR	Artem Favorov	12	3	5+6	3	1	0
16	FW	(Costa Rica) CRC	Jonathan Moya	12	2	6+5	2	1	0
17	DF	(Spain) ESP	Aitor	9	0	7+1	0	1	0
22	DF	(Ukraine) UKR	Yarema Kavatsiv	1	0	0	0	1	0
24	MF	(Ukraine) UKR	Ruslan Zubkov	9	0	5+4	0	0	0
27	MF	(Ukraine) UKR	Oleksandr Kochura	3	0	0+2	0	1	0
28	MF	(Ukraine) UKR	Yevhen Chumak	5	0	2+3	0	0	0
29	DF	(Ukraine) UKR	Volodymyr Bayenko	14	0	14	0	0	0
30	GK	(Ukraine) UKR	Hennadiy Hanyev	2	0	1	0	1	0
32	MF	(Spain) ESP	Borja Ekiza	11	1	10	1	1	0
99	FW	(Ukraine) UKR	Roman Loktionov	7	0	1+5	0	0+1	0

Source: Competitions

Last updated: 31 May 2017

=== Goalscorers ===
Rank	No.	Pos	Nat	Name	Premier League	Cup	Total
1	21	MF	(Ukraine)	Ihor Zahalskyi	4	0	4
2	10	FW	(Ukraine)	Artem Favorov	3	0	3
2	11	MF	(Ukraine)	Andriy Batsula	3	0	3
2	14	MF	(Ukraine)	Artem Sitalo	3	0	3
2	26	MF	(Ukraine)	Dmytro Bilonoh	3	0	3
6	4	DF	(Argentina)	Federico Pereyra	2	0	2
6	16	FW	(Costa Rica)	Jonathan Moya	2	0	2
6	18	DF	(Moldova)	Oleksandr Kucherenko	2	0	2
9	7	MF	(Ukraine)	Maksym Drachenko	1	0	1
9	8	MF	(Ukraine)	Vladyslav Lupashko	1	0	1
9	10	FW	(Ukraine)	Aderinsola Habib Eseola	1	0	1
9	28	MF	(Ukraine)	Pavlo Polehenko	1	0	1
9	29	FW	(Ukraine)	Maksym Pryadun	1	0	1
9	32	MF	(Spain)	Borja Ekiza	1	0	1
9	95	MF	(Ukraine)	Roman Popov	1	0	1

Last updated: 31 May 2017

=== Clean sheets ===
Rank	No.	Pos	Nat	Name	Premier League	Cup	Total
1	44	GK	(Ukraine)	Yevhen Past	6	0	6
2	41	GK	(Ukraine)	Roman Lyopka	2	0	2

Last updated: 20 May 2017

=== Disciplinary record ===
No.	Pos	Nat	Player	Premier League			Cup			Total		
No.	Pos	Nat	Player	Booked	(yellow card) (yellow-red card)	Sent off (straight red)	Booked	(yellow card) (yellow-red card)	Sent off (straight red)	Booked	(yellow card) (yellow-red card)	Sent off (straight red)
4	DF	(Argentina)	Federico Pereyra	8	0	0	0	0	0	8	0	0
5	DF	(Brazil)	Nailson	1	0	0	0	0	0	1	0	0
7	MF	(Ukraine)	Vitaliy Havrysh	2	0	0	0	0	0	2	0	0
7	MF	(Ukraine)	Ihor Kalinin	1	0	0	0	0	0	1	0	0
7	MF	(Ukraine)	Maksym Drachenko	5	0	0	0	0	0	5	0	0
8	MF	(Ukraine)	Vladyslav Lupashko	3	0	0	0	0	0	3	0	0
9	MF	(Ukraine)	Artem Schedryi	2	0	0	0	0	0	2	0	0
10	DF	(Ukraine)	Oleh Dopilka	1	0	0	0	0	0	1	0	0
10	FW	(Ukraine)	Artem Favorov	2	0	0	0	0	0	2	0	0
10	FW	(Ukraine)	Aderinsola Habib Eseola	2	1	0	0	0	0	2	1	0
11	MF	(Ukraine)	Andriy Batsula	4	0	0	0	0	0	4	0	0
14	MF	(Ukraine)	Artem Sitalo	3	0	0	0	0	0	3	0	0
15	FW	(Ukraine)	Oleksiy Zbun	2	0	0	0	0	0	2	0	0
16	FW	(Costa Rica)	Jonathan Moya	5	0	0	0	0	0	5	0	0
17	DF	(Spain)	Aitor	0	0	0	1	0	0	1	0	0
18	DF	(Moldova)	Oleksandr Kucherenko	4	0	0	0	0	0	4	0	0
20	DF	(Ukraine)	Dmytro Fatyeyev	3	0	0	0	0	0	3	0	0
21	MF	(Ukraine)	Ihor Zahalskyi	6	0	0	0	0	0	6	0	0
24	MF	(Ukraine)	Ruslan Zubkov	2	1	0	0	0	0	2	1	0
26	MF	(Ukraine)	Dmytro Bilonoh	3	1	0	0	0	0	3	1	0
27	MF	(Ukraine)	Oleksandr Kochura	1	0	0	0	0	0	1	0	0
27	MF	(Ukraine)	Kyrylo Dryshlyuk	2	0	0	0	0	0	2	0	0
28	MF	(Ukraine)	Pavlo Polehenko	1	0	0	0	0	0	1	0	0
29	DF	(Ukraine)	Volodymyr Bayenko	4	0	0	0	0	0	4	0	0
32	MF	(Spain)	Borja Ekiza	3	0	0	0	0	0	3	0	0
44	GK	(Ukraine)	Yevhen Past	1	0	0	0	0	0	1	0	0
55	DF	(Ukraine)	Maksym Kovalyov	2	0	0	0	0	0	2	0	0
77	FW	(Ukraine)	Oleksiy Chychykov	2	0	0	0	0	0	2	0	0
95	MF	(Ukraine)	Roman Popov	4	0	0	1	0	0	5	0	0
99	MF	(Ukraine)	Mykyta Zhukov	1	0	0	0	0	0	1	0	0

Last updated: 31 May 2017
