= 2013–14 FC Chornomorets Odesa season =

Chornomorets Odesa
2013-14 season
- President: Leonid Klimov
- Manager: Roman Hryhorchuk
- Stadium: Chornomorets Stadium
- Ukrainian Premier League: 5th
- Ukrainian Cup: Semifinals
- Ukrainian Super Cup: Runners-up vs Shakhtar Donetsk
- Europa League: Round of 32 vs Lyon
- Top goalscorer: League: Oleksiy Antonov (5); All: Oleksiy Antonov (10)
- Highest home attendance: 34,000 vs Skënderbeu Korçë; 22 August 2013
- Lowest home attendance: 20,115 vs Volyn Lutsk; 6 October 2013
- Average home league attendance: 20,115; 8 April 2014

The 2025–26 season was the 76th season in the club's history and the 23rd season of Odesa football club "Chornomorets" in the domestic league/cup of Ukraine. "The Sailors" reached the last 32 of the UEFA Europa League, where they were eliminated by Lyon, were runners-up to Shakhtar Donetsk in the Ukrainian Super Cup and reached semifinal stage of the Ukrainian Cup.

Following the compulsory winter break the championship was due to resume on 1 March 2014, but due to the civil unrest in the country after the riots in Kyiv and continuing on with the annexation of Crimea by the Russian Federation, the Premier League delayed the start of the spring stage. A decision was made by the Ukrainian Premier League to resume the competition on 15 March.

== Squad ==
As of 21 March 2014

Note: Flags indicate national team as defined under FIFA eligibility rules; some limited exceptions apply. Players may hold more than one non-FIFA nationality.

No.	Pos.	Nation	Player
2	DF	UKR	Petro Kovalchuk
6	MF	BRA	Leo Matos
7	MF	GEO	Tornike Okriashvili (on loan from Shakhtar)
8	MF	UKR	Kyrylo Kovalchuk
9	FW	UKR	Anatoliy Didenko
10	MF	UKR	Oleksiy Gai
11	MF	UKR	Ivan Bobko
12	GK	UKR	Dmytro Bezotosnyi (Captain)
13	GK	UKR	Yuriy Martyshchuk
17	MF	UKR	Volodymyr Arzhanov

No.	Pos.	Nation	Player
25	DF	UKR	Yevhen Martynenko
37	GK	UKR	Andriy Hluschenko
42	DF	UKR	Yevhen Zubeyko
44	GK	UKR	Yevhen Past
52	DF	CMR	Adolphe Teikeu
69	FW	UKR	Oleksiy Antonov
77	DF	UKR	Pavlo Kutas
82	MF	UKR	Pavlo Rebenok (on loan from Metalist)
88	MF	UKR	Rinar Valeyev
94	MF	UKR	Oleh Danchenko

=== Out on loan ===
Note: Flags indicate national team as defined under FIFA eligibility rules; some limited exceptions apply. Players may hold more than one non-FIFA nationality.

No.	Pos.	Nation	Player
—	DF	UKR	Andriy Slinkin (at Senica)
—	FW	UKR	Denys Aleksandrov (at Slavia Mozyr)

No.	Pos.	Nation	Player
—	FW	UKR	Vitaliy Balashov (at Hoverla Uzhhorod)
—	FW	UKR	Artem Kulishenko (at Daugava Daugavpils)

== Transfers ==
=== Summer ===
In: Note: Flags indicate national team as defined under FIFA eligibility rules; some limited exceptions apply. Players may hold more than one non-FIFA nationality.

No.	Pos.	Nation	Player
7	FW	UKR	Volodymyr Pryyomov (from (Ukraine) Kryvbas Kryvyi Rih)
10	FW	UKR	Oleksiy Gai (from (Ukraine) Shakhtar Donetsk)
18	FW	RUS	Sergey Samodin (from (Ukraine) Kryvbas Kryvyi Rih)
69	FW	UKR	Oleksiy Antonov (loan return from (Ukraine) Kryvbas Kryvyi Rih)
88	MF	UKR	Rinar Valeyev (from (Ukraine) Kryvbas Kryvyi Rih)

Out: Note: Flags indicate national team as defined under FIFA eligibility rules; some limited exceptions apply. Players may hold more than one non-FIFA nationality.

No.	Pos.	Nation	Player
3	DF	BRA	Léo Veloso
7	FW	UKR	Vitaliy Balashov (loan to (Ukraine) Hoverla Uzhhorod)
16	FW	UZB	Maksim Shatskikh (to (Ukraine) Arsenal Kyiv)
20	FW	ROU	Lucian Burdujan (to (Ukraine) Tavriya Simferopol)
39	MF	UKR	Artem Starhorodskyi (to (Ukraine) Arsenal Kyiv)
89	MF	UKR	Serhiy Politylo

=== Winter ===
In: Note: Flags indicate national team as defined under FIFA eligibility rules; some limited exceptions apply. Players may hold more than one non-FIFA nationality.

No.	Pos.	Nation	Player
7	MF	GEO	Tornike Okriashvili (loan from (Ukraine) Shakhtar Donetsk)
17	MF	UKR	Volodymyr Arzhanov (from (Ukraine) Arsenal Kyiv)
37	GK	UKR	Andriy Hlushchenko (from retirement)
52	DF	CMR	Adolphe Teikeu (from (Ukraine) Metalurh Zaporizhzhia)
82	MF	UKR	Pavlo Rebenok (loan from (Ukraine) Metalist Kharkiv)

Out: Note: Flags indicate national team as defined under FIFA eligibility rules; some limited exceptions apply. Players may hold more than one non-FIFA nationality.

No.	Pos.	Nation	Player
4	DF	AUT	Markus Berger (to (Norway) IK Start)
7	FW	UKR	Volodymyr Pryyomov (to (Ukraine) Metalurh Zaporizhzhia)
18	FW	RUS	Sergey Samodin (to (Russia) Mordovia Saransk)
19	FW	ALB	Elis Bakaj (to (Albania) Kukësi)
23	FW	CIV	Franck Dja Djédjé (to (Norway) Sarpsborg 08)
29	DF	ARG	Pablo Fontanello (to (Norway) Stabæk)
32	DF	ALB	Kristi Vangjeli (to (Greece) Aris)
33	DF	UKR	Andriy Slinkin (loan to (Slovakia) FK Senica)
55	DF	BRA	Anderson Mineiro
99	FW	ESP	Sito Riera

== Competitions ==
=== Super Cup ===
10 July 2013	Chornomorets Odesa	1 - 3	Shaktar Donetsk	Odesa
21:00 EEST (UTC+3)	Antonov 45+1'	Summary	Fred 17', 33'; Taison 68' (pen.)	Stadium: Chornomorets Stadium; Attendance: 32,400; Referee: Sergiy Boyko

=== Ukrainian Premier League ===
==== Results ====
14 July 2013 1	Sevastopol	1 – 1	Chornomorets Odesa	Sevastopol
20:30 EEST (UTC+3)	Kovpak 43'	Summary	Dja Djédjé (yellow card) 22'; Bakaj 39' (pen.) (yellow card) 71'	Stadium: Sevastopol Sports Complex; Attendance: 5,575; Referee: Evgen Aranovskiy

21 July 2013 2	Chornomorets Odesa	1 – 1	Vorskla Poltava	Odesa
20:30 EEST (UTC+3)	Sito Riera 13' (yellow card) 90+5'	Summary	Sapay 90+2'	Stadium: Chornomorets Stadium; Attendance: 12,753; Referee: Yaroslav Kozyk

28 July 2013 3	Shakhtar Donetsk	1 – 0	Chornomorets Odesa	Donetsk
18:00 EEST (UTC+3)	Douglas Costa 73'	Summary	Vladimir Priyomov (yellow card) 49'; Bobko (yellow card) 54'; Antonov (yellow card) 73'	Stadium: Donbas Arena; Attendance: 41,704; Referee: Yuriy Moseychuk

4 August 2013 4	Chornomorets Odesa	1 – 0	Metalurh Donetsk	Odesa
21:30 EEST (UTC+3)	Antonov 40'	Summary		Stadium: Chornomorets Stadium; Attendance: 12,963; Referee: Yury Vaks

11 August 2013 5	Dynamo Kyiv	1 – 2	Chornomorets Odesa	Kyiv
19:30 EEST (UTC+3)	Sydorchuk 55'	Summary	Pryyomov 42'; Fontanello 87'	Stadium: Olympic Stadium; Attendance: 29,174; Referee: Yuri Mozharovskiy

16 August 2013 6	Chornomorets Odesa	Awardered	Arsenal Kyiv	Odesa
20:00 EEST (UTC+3)		Summary		Stadium: Chornomorets Stadium; Attendance: 19,122; Referee: Anatoliy Abdula

25 August 2013 7	Tavriya Simferopol	1 – 2	Chornomorets Odesa	Simferopol
EEST (UTC+3)	Korobka 90+1'	Summary	Samodin 2', 52'	Stadium: RSC Lokomotiv; Attendance: 1,500; Referee: Sergiy Dankovskyi

1 September 2013 8	Chornomorets Odesa	1 – 0	Illichivets Mariupol	Odesa
19:00 EEST (UTC+3)	Antonov 72'	Summary		Stadium: Chornomorets Stadium; Attendance: 18,834; Referee: Yury Vaks

13 September 2013 9	Metalurh Zaporizhzhia	0 – 1	Chornomorets Odesa	Zaporizhzhia
20:30 EEST (UTC+3)		Summary	Fontanello 38'	Stadium: Slavutych-Arena; Attendance: 6,700; Referee: Yury Vaks

22 September 2013 10	Chornomorets Odesa	3 – 1	Zorya Luhansk	Odesa
19:00 EEST (UTC+3)	Dja Djédjé 8', 55'; Riera 26'	Summary	Boli 67'	Stadium: Chornomorets Stadium; Attendance: 18,123; Referee: Kostyantin Trukhanov

28 September 2013 11	Dnipro	2 – 0	Chornomorets Odesa	Dnipropetrovsk
19:30 EEST (UTC+3)	Kalinić 45'; Konoplyanka 75'	Summary	Antonov (red card) 70'	Stadium: Dnipro Arena; Attendance: 15,397; Referee: Yuri Mozharovskiy

6 October 2013 12	Chornomorets Odesa	0 – 0	Volyn Lutsk	Odesa
19:00 EEST (UTC+3)		Summary		Stadium: Chornomorets Stadium; Attendance: 10,192; Referee: Oleksandr Bilokur

20 October 2013 13	Metalurh Donetsk	0 – 0	Chornomorets Odesa	Donetsk
19:30 EEST (UTC+3)		Summary		Stadium: Metalurh Stadium; Attendance: 35,244; Referee: Dmitriy Kutakov

27 October 2013 14	Chornomorets Odesa	2 – 1	Hoverla Uzhhorod	Odesa
19:00 EEST (UTC+3)	Dja Djédjé 32'; Antonov 38'	Summary	Niculae 8'	Stadium: Chornomorets Stadium; Attendance: 15,183; Referee: Ivan Bondar

3 November 2013 15	Karpaty Lviv	1 – 1	Chornomorets Odesa	Lviv
19:30 EET (UTC+2)	Fedorchuk 24'	Summary	Didenko 90+2'	Stadium: Ukraina Stadium; Attendance: 6,300; Referee: Anatoliy Zhabchenko

10 November 2013 16	Chornomorets Odesa	2 – 0	Sevastopol	Odesa
19:00 EEST (UTC+3)	Antonov 15'; Riera 31'	Summary		Stadium: Chornomorets Stadium; Attendance: 12,803; Referee: Oleksandr Ivanov

23 November 2013 17	Vorskla Poltava	0 – 1	Chornomorets Odesa	Poltava
13:30 EET (UTC+2)		Summary	Kovalchuk 9'	Stadium: Oleksiy Butovskyi Vorskla Stadium; Attendance: 3,500; Referee: Sergiy Berezka

3 December 2013 18	Chornomorets Odesa	0 – 1	Shakhtar Donetsk	Odesa
19:00 EET (UTC+2)		Summary	Adriano 44'	Stadium: Chornomorets Stadium; Attendance: 24,150; Referee: Sergiy Boyko

9 March 2014 20	Chornomorets Odesa	Postponed	Dynamo Kyiv	Odesa
19:30 EET (UTC+2)		Summary		Stadium: Chornomorets Stadium

14 March 2013 21	Arsenal Kyiv	Awardered	Chornomorets Odesa	Kyiv
EET (UTC+2)		Summary		Stadium: Dynamo Stadium

22 March 2014 22	Chornomorets Odesa	0 – 0	Tavriya Simferopol	Odesa
19:30 EET (UTC+2)		Summary		Stadium: Chornomorets Stadium; Attendance: 12,771; Referee: Oleksandr Ivanov

30 March 2014 23	Illichivets Mariupol	3 – 1	Chornomorets Odesa	Mariupol
14:00 EEST (UTC+3)	Kulach 28'; Totovytskyi 68'; Churko 74'	Summary	Okriashvili 87'	Stadium: Illichivets Stadium; Attendance: 5,500; Referee: Ivan Bondar

6 April 2014 24	Chornomorets Odesa	3 – 0	Metalurh Zaporizhzhia	Odesa
14:00 EEST (UTC+3)	Gai 3', 83'; Antonov 20'	Summary	Korotetskiy (yellow card) 31' (yellow-red card) 90+2'	Stadium: Chornomorets Stadium; Attendance: 12,244; Referee: Anatoliy Abdula

12 April 2014 25	Zorya Luhansk	1 – 0	Chornomorets Odesa	Luhansk
17:00 EEST (UTC+3)	Boli 20'	Summary		Stadium: Avanhard Stadium; Attendance: 6,000; Referee: Sergiy Berezka

16 April 2014 19	Metalurh Donetsk	3 – 2	Chornomorets Odesa	Donetsk
16:00 EEST (UTC+3)	Moraes 31' (pen.), 66'; Lazić 40'	Summary	Kovalchuk (yellow card) 13' (yellow-red card) 41'; Okriashvili 59'; Gai 81' (pen.)	Stadium: Metalurh Stadium; Attendance: 1,700; Referee: Evgen Aranovskiy

20 April 2014 26	Chornomorets Odesa	1 – 0	Dnipro	Odesa
19:30 EEST (UTC+3)	Okriashvili 34'	Summary		Stadium: Chornomorets Stadium; Attendance: 15,121; Referee: Anatoliy Zhabchenko

24 April 2014 20	Chornomorets Odesa	1 – 1	Dynamo Kyiv	Odesa
19:30 EEST (UTC+3)	Antonov 18'	Summary	Makarenko 89'	Stadium: Chornomorets Stadium; Attendance: 26,542; Referee: Yuiry Moseychuk

28 April 2014 27	Volyn Lutsk	1 – 2	Chornomorets Odesa	Lutsk
19:00 EEST (UTC+3)	Kozban 69'	Summary	Arzhanov 11'; Antonov 12'	Stadium: Avanhard Stadium; Attendance: 5,200; Referee: Sergiy Dankovskyi

2 May 2014 28	Chornomorets Odesa	1 – 1	Metalist Kharkiv	Odesa
17:00 EEST (UTC+3)	Antonov 42'	Summary	Yussuf 52'	Stadium: Chornomorets Stadium; Attendance: 21,686; Referee: Evgen Aranovskiy

11 May 2014 29	Hoverla Uzhhorod	1 – 1	Chornomorets Odesa	Uzhhorod
17:00 EEST (UTC+3)	Sharpar 90+3'	Summary	Antonov 24'	Stadium: Avanhard Stadium; Attendance: 0 Referee: Sergiy Berezka

18 May 2014 30	Chornomorets Odesa	0 – 0	Karpaty Lviv	Odesa
17:00 EEST (UTC+3)		Summary		Stadium: Chornomorets Stadium; Attendance: 3,200; Referee: Yaroslav Kozyk

==== League table ====
Pos	Team	Pld	W	D	L	GF	GA	GD	Pts	Qualification or relegation
3	Metalist Kharkiv	28	16	9	3	54	29	+25	57	Qualification for the Europa League play-off round
4	Dynamo Kyiv	28	16	5	7	55	33	+22	53	Qualification for the Europa League group stage (Note: FC Dynamo Kyiv qualified for the Group Stage of the 2014-15 Europa League as the 2013-14 Ukrainian Cup winner.)
5	Chornomorets Odesa	28	12	10	6	30	22	+8	46	Qualification for the Europa League third qualifying round
6	Metalurh Donetsk	28	12	7	9	45	42	+3	43	
7	Zorya Luhansk	28	11	9	8	35	30	+5	42	Qualification for the Europa League second qualifying round

Source: uafootball.net.ua
Rules for classification: 1st points; 2nd goal difference; 3rd goals scored; 4th head-to-head points; 5th head-to-head goal difference; 6th head-to-head goals scored; 7th fair play rating

=== Ukrainian Cup ===
25 September 2013 Round of 32	Enerhiya Mykolaiv	0 – 4	Chornomorets Odesa	Pervomaisk
16:00 EEST (UTC+3)		Summary	Bakaj 1'; Didenko 40'; Slinkin 84'; Valeyev 90'	Stadium: Central Stadium; Attendance: 3,100; Referee: Yuriy Foshchiy

30 October 2013 Round of 16	Chornomorets Odesa	w/o	Dnipro	Odesa
19:45 EEST (UTC+3)		Summary		Stadium: Chornomorets Stadium

26 March 2014 Quarterfinals	FC Ternopil	0 – 1	Chornomorets Odesa	Ternopil
19:00 EET (UTC+2)		Summary	Didenko 90+4'	Stadium: City Stadium; Attendance: 12,000; Referee: Oleksandr Bilokur

7 May 2014 Semimfinal	Chornomorets Odesa	0 – 4	Dynamo Kyiv	Odesa
19:00 EEST (UTC+3)		Summary	Harmash 26', 40'; Yarmolenko 52' (pen.); Mbokani 67'	Stadium: Chornomorets Stadium; Attendance: 23,380; Referee: Anatoliy Abdula

=== UEFA Europa League ===
==== Qualifying rounds ====
18 July 2013 Second qualifying round 1st leg	Chornomorets Odesa (Ukraine)	2 – 0	(Moldova) Dacia Chişinău	Odesa, Ukraine
20:00 EEST (UTC+3)	Samodin 46'; Antonov 90+4'	Summary		Stadium: Chornomorets Stadium; Attendance: 20,230; Referee: Mike Dean (England)

25 July 2013 Second qualifying round 2nd leg	Dacia Chişinău (Moldova)	2 – 1 (2 – 3 agg.)	(Ukraine) Chornomorets Odesa	Chișinău, Moldova
20:15 EEST (UTC+3)	Orlovschi 45+3'; Orbu 64'	Summary	Gai 26'	Stadium: Zimbru Stadium; Attendance: 3,720; Referee: Serdar Gözübüyük (Netherlands)

1 August 2013 Third qualifying round 1st leg	Chornomorets Odesa (Ukraine)	3 – 1	(Serbia) Red Star Belgrade	Odesa, Ukraine
19:15 EEST (UTC+3)	Riera 32'; Dja Djédjé 38'; Antonov 78' (pen.)	Summary	Savićević 59'	Stadium: Chornomorets Stadium; Attendance: 28,862; Referee: Kenn Hansen (Denmark)

8 August 2013 Third qualifying round 2nd leg	Red Star Belgrade (Serbia)	0 – 0 (1 – 3 agg.)	(Ukraine) Chornomorets Odesa	Belgrade, Serbia
21:30 EEST (UTC+3)		Summary		Stadium: Red Star Stadium; Attendance: 39,730; Referee: Artur Soares (Portugal)

22 August 2013 Play-off round 1st leg	Chornomorets Odesa (Ukraine)	1 – 0	(Albania) Skënderbeu Korçë	Odesa, Ukraine
21:30 EEST (UTC+3)	Gai 75'	Summary		Stadium: Chornomorets Stadium; Attendance: 34,000; Referee: Anastassios Kakos (Greece)

29 August 2013 Play-off round 2nd leg	Skënderbeu Korçë (Albania)	1 – 0 (a.e.t.) (1 – 1 agg.) (6 – 7 p)	(Ukraine) Chornomorets Odesa	Tirana, Albania
21:00 EEST (UTC+3)	Ribaj 19'	Summary		Stadium: Qemal Stafa Stadium; Attendance: 7,500; Referee: Antonio Mateu Lahoz (Spain)
	Penalties
	Shkëmbi (penalty scored); Radas (penalty missed); Ribaj (penalty scored); Shehi (penalty scored); Gvozdenović (penalty scored); Bicaj (penalty scored); Lilaj (penalty scored); Orelesi (penalty missed); Nimaga (penalty missed)		(penalty scored) Didenko; (penalty scored) Fontanello; (penalty scored) Kutas; (penalty scored) Gai; (penalty missed) Léo Matos; (penalty scored) Samodin; (penalty scored) Anderson Mineiro; (penalty missed) Kovalchuk; (penalty scored) Pryyomov

==== Group stages ====
Pos	Team	Pld	W	D	L	GF	GA	GD	Pts	Qualification
1	(Bulgaria) Ludogorets Razgrad	6	5	1	0	11	2	+9	16	Advance to knockout phase
2	(Ukraine) Chornomorets Odesa	6	3	1	2	6	6	0	10	Advance to knockout phase
3	(Netherlands) PSV Eindhoven	6	2	1	3	4	5	−1	7	
4	(Croatia) Dinamo Zagreb	6	0	1	5	3	11	−8	1	

Source: Soccerway

19 September 2013 1	Dinamo Zagreb (Croatia)	1 – 2	(Ukraine) Chornomorets Odesa	Zagreb, Croatia
20:00 EEST (UTC+3)	Fernándes 43'	Report	Antonov 62'; Dja Djédjé 65'	Stadium: Stadion Maksimir; Attendance: 12,522; Referee: Hüseyin Göçek (Turkey)

3 October 2013 2	Chornomorets Odesa (Ukraine)	0 – 2	(Netherlands) PSV Eindhoven	Odesa, Ukraine
22:05 EEST (UTC+3)		Report	Memphis 13'; Jozefzoon 88'	Stadium: Chornomorets Stadium; Attendance: 33,839; Referee: Liran Liany (Israel)

24 October 2013 3	Chornomorets Odesa (Ukraine)	0 – 1	(Bulgaria) Ludogorets Razgrad	Odesa, Ukraine
22:05 EEST (UTC+3)		Report	Zlatinski 45'	Stadium: Chornomorets Stadium; Attendance: 20,082; Referee: Alexandru Tudor (Romania)

7 November 2013 4	Ludogorets Razgrad (Bulgaria)	1 – 1	(Ukraine) Chornomorets Odesa	Sofia, Bulgaria
20:00 EET (UTC+2)	Juninho Quixadá 47'	Report	Gai 64'	Stadium: Vasil Levski National Stadium; Attendance: 6,113; Referee: Stefan Johannesson (Sweden)

28 November 2013 5	Chornomorets Odesa (Ukraine)	2 – 1	(Croatia) Dinamo Zagreb	Odesa, Ukraine
22:05 EET (UTC+2)	Antonov 78'; Didenko 90+1'	Report	Bećiraj 20'	Stadium: Chornomorets Stadium; Attendance: 14,182; Referee: Felix Zwayer (Germany)

12 December 2013 6	PSV Eindhoven (Netherlands)	0 – 1	(Ukraine) Chornomorets Odesa	Eindhoven, Netherlands
20:00 EET (UTC+2)		Report	Dja Djédjé 59'; Riera (red card)	Stadium: Philips Stadion; Attendance: 13,500; Referee: Carlos Clos Gómez (Spain)

==== Knoutout Stages ====
20 February 2014 Round of 32 1st leg	Chornomorets Odesa (Ukraine)	0 – 0	(France) Lyon	Odesa, Ukraine
20:00 EET (UTC+2)		Summary		Stadium: Chornomorets Stadium; Attendance: 28,456; Referee: Craig Thomson (Scotland)

27 February 2014 Round of 32 2nd leg	Lyon (France)	1 – 0 (1 – 0 agg.)	(Ukraine) Chornomorets Odesa	Lyon, France
22:05 EET (UTC+2)	Lacazette 80'	Summary	Zubeyko (yellow card) 16' (yellow-red card) 76'	Stadium: Stade de Gerland; Attendance: 25,039; Referee: Aleksandar Stavrev (Macedonia)

== Squad statistics ==
As of Match played 18 May 2014

=== Appearances and goals ===
No.	Pos	Nat	Player	Total		Premier League		Ukrainian Cup		Ukrainian Super Cup		Europa League	
No.	Pos	Nat	Player	Apps	Goals	Apps	Goals	Apps	Goals	Apps	Goals	Apps	Goals
2	DF	(Ukraine) UKR	Petro Kovalchuk	10	0	7+0	0	2+0	0	0+0	0	1+0	0
6	MF	(Brazil) BRA	Léo Matos	35	0	16+6	0	3+0	0	0+0	0	3+7	0
7	MF	(Georgia (country)) GEO	Tornike Okriashvili	14	3	7+3	3	2+0	0	0+0	0	0+2	0
8	MF	(Ukraine) UKR	Kyrylo Kovalchuk	44	1	28+0	1	2+0	0	1+0	0	13+0	0
9	FW	(Ukraine) UKR	Anatoliy Didenko	33	4	0+20	1	2+1	2	0+0	0	0+10	1
10	MF	(Ukraine) UKR	Oleksiy Gai	40	6	24+0	3	2+0	0	1+0	0	13+0	3
11	MF	(Ukraine) UKR	Ivan Bobko	34	0	14+5	0	2+0	0	0+1	0	11+1	0
12	GK	(Ukraine) UKR	Dmytro Bezotosnyi	43	0	28+0	0	2+0	0	1+0	0	12+0	0
17	MF	(Ukraine) UKR	Volodymyr Arzhanov	13	1	9+2	1	2+0	0	0+0	0	0+0	0
25	DF	(Ukraine) UKR	Yevhen Martynenko	3	0	2+0	0	1+0	0	0+0	0	0+0	0
42	DF	(Ukraine) UKR	Yevhen Zubeyko	27	0	16+4	0	2+0	0	0+0	0	4+1	0
44	GK	(Ukraine) UKR	Yevhen Past	3	0	0+0	0	1+0	0	0+0	0	2+0	0
52	DF	(Cameroon) CMR	Adolphe Teikeu	12	0	10+0	0	2+0	0	0+0	0	0+0	0
69	FW	(Ukraine) UKR	Oleksiy Antonov	42	14	23+2	9	2+0	0	1+0	1	14+0	4
77	DF	(Ukraine) UKR	Pavlo Kutas	32	0	18+0	0	2+0	0	1+0	0	10+1	0
82	MF	(Ukraine) UKR	Pavlo Rebenok	14	0	8+3	0	2+0	0	0+0	0	0+1	0
88	MF	(Ukraine) UKR	Rinar Valeyev	11	1	4+4	0	2+0	1	0+0	0	0+1	0
94	MF	(Ukraine) UKR	Oleh Danchenko	12	0	5+6	0	1+0	0	0+0	0	0+0	0
Players away from the club on loan:
33	DF	(Ukraine) UKR	Andriy Slinkin	2	1	0+0	0	1+0	1	0+1	0	0+0	0
Players who appeared for Chornomorets Odesa who left the club during the season:
4	DF	(Austria) AUT	Markus Berger	30	0	16+0	0	0+0	0	1+0	0	13+0	0
7	FW	(Ukraine) UKR	Volodymyr Pryyomov	22	1	9+4	1	0+1	0	0+0	0	2+6	0
18	FW	(Russia) RUS	Sergey Samodin	22	3	8+4	2	1+0	0	0+1	0	5+3	1
19	FW	(Albania) ALB	Elis Bakaj	9	2	2+2	1	1+0	1	1+0	0	2+1	0
23	FW	(Ivory Coast) CIV	Franck Dja Djédjé	31	6	12+3	3	0+1	0	1+0	0	13+1	3
29	DF	(Argentina) ARG	Pablo Fontanello	32	2	17+0	2	0+0	0	1+0	0	14+0	0
32	DF	(Albania) ALB	Kristi Vangjeli	7	0	3+1	0	1+0	0	1+0	0	0+1	0
55	DF	(Brazil) BRA	Anderson Mineiro	25	0	12+1	0	0+0	0	0+0	0	12+0	0
99	FW	(Spain) ESP	Sito Riera	28	4	11+4	3	0+0	0	1+0	0	10+2	1

=== Goal scorers ===
Place	Position	Nation	Number	Name	Premier League	Ukrainian Cup	Ukrainian Super Cup	Europa League	Total
1	FW	(Ukraine)	69	Oleksiy Antonov	9	0	1	4	14
2	FW	(Ivory Coast)	23	Franck Dja Djédjé	3	0	0	3	6
2	FW	(Ukraine)	10	Oleksiy Gai	3	0	0	3	6
4	FW	(Spain)	99	Sito Riera	3	0	0	1	4
4	FW	(Ukraine)	9	Anatoliy Didenko	1	2	0	1	4
6	MF	(Georgia (country))	7	Tornike Okriashvili	3	0	0	0	3
6	FW	(Russia)	18	Sergey Samodin	2	0	0	1	3
8	DF	(Argentina)	29	Pablo Fontanello	2	0	0	0	2
8	FW	(Albania)	19	Elis Bakaj	1	1	0	0	2
10	MF	(Ukraine)	8	Kyrylo Kovalchuk	1	0	0	0	1
10	FW	(Ukraine)	7	Volodymyr Pryyomov	1	0	0	0	1
10	MF	(Ukraine)	17	Volodymyr Arzhanov	1	0	0	0	1
10	DF	(Ukraine)	33	Andriy Slinkin	0	1	0	0	1
10	MF	(Ukraine)	88	Rinar Valeyev	0	1	0	0	1
				TOTALS	30	5	1	13	49

=== Disciplinary record ===
Number	Nation	Position	Name	Premier League		Ukrainian Cup		Ukrainian Super Cup		Europa League		Total	
Number	Nation	Position	Name	Yellow card	Red card	Yellow card	Red card	Yellow card	Red card	Yellow card	Red card	Yellow card	Red card
2	(Ukraine)	DF	Petro Kovalchuk	2	1	0	0	0	0	0	0	2	1
4	(Austria)	DF	Markus Berger	3	0	0	0	0	0	3	0	6	0
6	(Brazil)	MF	Léo Matos	3	0	0	0	0	0	1	0	4	0
7	(Ukraine)	FW	Volodymyr Pryyomov	3	0	0	0	0	0	0	0	3	0
7	(Georgia (country))	MF	Tornike Okriashvili	3	0	1	0	0	0	0	0	4	0
8	(Ukraine)	MF	Kyrylo Kovalchuk	3	0	1	0	0	0	2	0	6	0
9	(Ukraine)	FW	Anatoliy Didenko	1	0	0	0	0	0	1	0	2	0
10	(Ukraine)	MF	Oleksiy Gai	1	0	0	0	0	0	0	0	1	0
11	(Ukraine)	MF	Ivan Bobko	3	0	0	0	0	0	0	0	3	0
17	(Ukraine)	MF	Volodymyr Arzhanov	2	0	0	0	0	0	0	0	2	0
18	(Russia)	FW	Sergey Samodin	2	0	0	0	0	0	0	0	2	0
19	(Albania)	FW	Elis Bakaj	2	0	0	0	0	0	0	0	2	0
23	(Ivory Coast)	FW	Franck Dja Djédjé	2	0	0	0	0	0	2	0	4	0
29	(Argentina)	DF	Pablo Fontanello	3	0	0	0	0	0	0	0	3	0
32	(Albania)	DF	Kristi Vangjeli	2	0	0	0	0	0	0	0	2	0
42	(Ukraine)	DF	Yevhen Zubeyko	3	0	0	0	0	0	2	1	5	1
55	(Brazil)	DF	Anderson Mineiro	0	0	0	0	0	0	1	0	1	0
69	(Ukraine)	FW	Oleksiy Antonov	3	1	1	0	0	0	1	0	5	1
77	(Ukraine)	DF	Pavlo Kutas	4	0	0	0	0	0	2	0	6	0
82	(Ukraine)	MF	Pavlo Rebenok	1	0	0	0	0	0	1	0	2	0
88	(Ukraine)	MF	Rinar Valeyev	0	0	1	0	0	0	0	0	2	0
94	(Ukraine)	MF	Oleh Danchenko	2	0	0	0	0	0	0	0	2	0
99	(Spain)	FW	Sito Riera	4	0	0	0	0	0	1	1	5	1
			TOTALS	52	2	4	0	0	0	17	2	73	4

== Notes ==
1. Match was not played. Dnipro Dnipropetrovsk did not arrive for the match as the plane with the team was not able to land due to fog forcing airport closures. Control Disciplinary Committee of the Football Federation of Ukraine deny Dnipro's request to play the match at a later date and are expelled from the Cup competition. Chornomorets advance to the next round of the competition.
2. On 9 May 2014 the FFU announced that all remaining League games, as well as the Cup Final, would be played behind closed doors due to security fear relating to the unrest in the country.
