= Zozulya =

Zozulya (Ukrainian: Зозуля, "cuckoo bird"), also spelled Zozulia and Zozula, is a Ukrainian surname. Notable people with the surname include:

- Anna Zozulia (born 1980), Ukrainian-Belgian chess player
- Fyodor Zozulya (1907–1964), Soviet admiral
- Greta Zozula, American cinematographer
- Oleksandr Zozulya (born 1996), Ukrainian footballer
- Roman Zozulya (footballer) (born 1989), Ukrainian footballer
- Roman Zozulya (gymnast) (born 1979), Ukrainian gymnast
- Vera Zozulya (born 1956), Soviet/Latvian luger
- Vira Zozulya (born 1970), Ukrainian race walker
