= Federico Pereyra =

Federico Pereyra may refer to:

- Federico Pereyra (volleyball) (born 1988), Argentine volleyball player
- Federico Pereyra (footballer) (born 1989), Argentine football defender

== See also ==
- Federico Pereira (born 2004), Uruguayan football right-back
