= Nailson =

Brazilian footballer (born 1994)

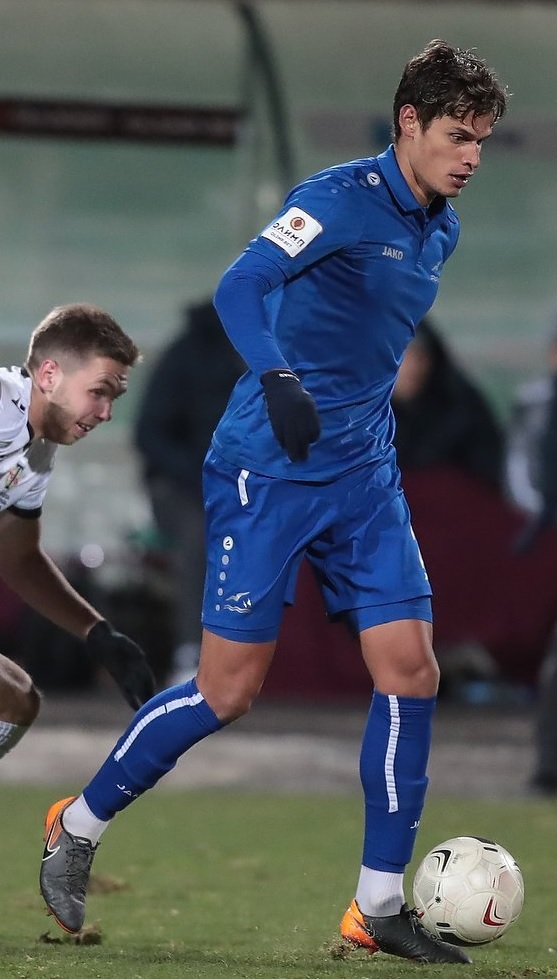
- Nailson with Baltika Kaliningrad in 2019

Personal information
- Full name: Nailson Fernando Medeiros
- Date of birth: 24 February 1994 (age 32)
- Place of birth: Jaguapitã, Brazil
- Height: 1.91 m (6 ft 3 in)
- Position: Centre-back

Team information
- Current team: Al-Jabalain
- Number: 4

Youth career
- Laranja Mecânica
- 2008–2010: Grêmio
- 2010–2012: Juventus-SP
- 2012–2014: Diadema
- 2012–2014: → Santos (loan)

Senior career*
Years	Team	Apps	(Gls)
2014–2015	Diadema	0	(0)
2014	→ Santos (loan)	1	(0)
2015	Mogi Mirim	0	(0)
2015–2019	União Leiria	67	(6)
2016	→ Famalicão (loan)	9	(0)
2017	→ Zirka Kropyvnytskyi (loan)	3	(0)
2019–2020	Baltika Kaliningrad	30	(3)
2021	Juventus-SP	12	(1)
2021–2022	Al-Adalah	26	(2)
2022–24	Al-Jabalain		
2025	Rio Branco-PR	7	(1)
2025	Galo Maringá	13	(2)
- * Club domestic league appearances and goals as of 27 September 2020

Nailson Fernando Medeiros (born 24 February 1994), simply known as Nailson, is a Brazilian professional footballer who plays as a central defender for Al-Jabalain.

== Personal life ==
Still an active player, Nailson has a YouTube channel which shows the background of a footballer's life.

== Career ==
Born in Jaguapitã, Paraná, Nailson joined Santos FC's youth setup in 2012, after playing for Grêmio and Juventus-SP. He was promoted to the main squad in 2014 by manager Oswaldo de Oliveira.

On 2 April 2014, Nailson made his first-team debut, starting in a 0–0 away draw against Mixto at Arena Pantanal, for that year's Copa do Brasil. He was released by the club at the end of the year.

On 2 May 2015, Nailson signed a one-year deal with Mogi Mirim.

On 2 July 2019, he signed a two-year contract with an option to extend for one additional year with the Russian Football National League club Baltika Kaliningrad. He left the club in 2020, after terminating his contract.

On 20 January 2021, Nailson was announced at Juventus, a club he already represented as a youth.

On 26 July 2021, Nailson joined Al-Adalah. On 16 June 2022, Nailson joined Al-Jabalain after leaving Al-Adalah.

== Career statistics ==
As of 3 January 2020

Appearances and goals by club, season and competition
Club	Season	League			State League		Cup		Continental		Other		Total	
Club	Season	Division	Apps	Goals	Apps	Goals	Apps	Goals	Apps	Goals	Apps	Goals	Apps	Goals
Santos	2014	Série A	1	0	0	0	2	0	—		—		3	0
União Leiria	2015–16	Campeonato de Portugal	14	1	—		0	0	—		—		14	1
União Leiria	2017–18	Campeonato de Portugal	25	2	—		1	0	—		—		26	2
União Leiria	2018–19	Campeonato de Portugal	28	3	—		0	0	—		—		28	3
União Leiria	Total		67	6	0	0	1	0	0	0	0	0	68	6
Famalicão (loan)	2016–17	LigaPro	7	0	—		3	1	—		—		10	1
Zirka Kropyvnytskyi (loan)	2016–17	Ukrainian Premier League	3	0	—		—		—		—		3	0
Baltika Kaliningrad	2019–20	Russian Premier League	20	1	—		2	0	—		—		22	1
Career total			98	7	0	0	8	1	0	0	0	0	106	8

== Honours ==
Santos

- Copa São Paulo de Futebol Júnior: 2013, 2014
- Copa do Brasil Sub-20: 2013
