= Jonathan Moya =

Costa Rican footballer (born 1992)

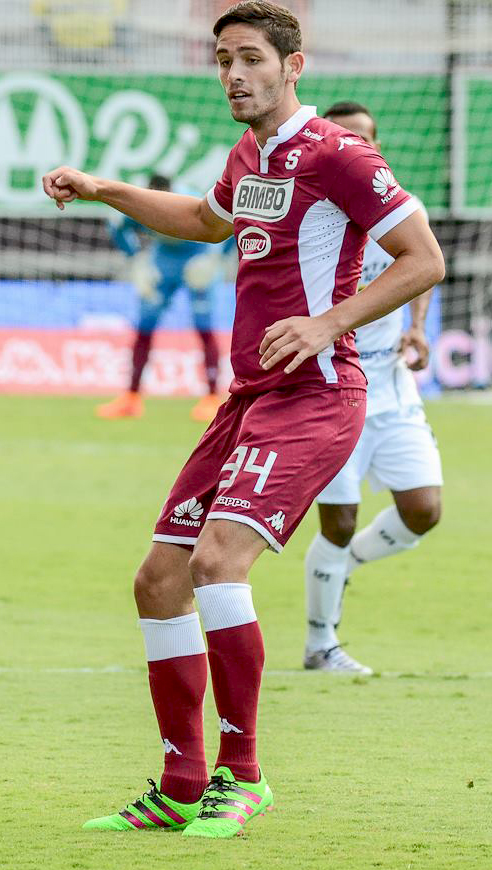
- Moya with Saprissa in 2016

Personal information
- Full name: Jonathan Alonso Moya Aguilar
- Date of birth: 6 January 1992 (age 34)
- Place of birth: San José, Costa Rica
- Height: 1.85 m (6 ft 1 in)
- Position: Forward

Team information
- Current team: Motagua

Youth career
- Saprissa

Senior career*
Years	Team	Apps	(Gls)
2010–2014	Saprissa Corazón		
2012	→ Santos Guápiles (loan)	34	(4)
2014	→ Uruguay de Coronado (loan)	36	(19)
2013–2017	Saprissa	78	(24)
2015–2016	→ Huesca (loan)	7	(1)
2016	→ Zirka Kropyvnytskyi (loan)	11	(2)
2018–2021	Alajuelense	100	(38)
2021	→ Anyang (loan)	28	(13)
2022–2023	Anyang	35	(14)
2023	Hyderabad	7	(1)
2024–2025	Alajuelense	60	(20)
2025–2026	Al-Bukiryah	23	(13)
2026–	Motagua	2	(2)

International career^{‡}
2009	Costa Rica U17	2	(1)
2010	Costa Rica U20	4	(1)
2014–2021	Costa Rica	15	(0)
- * Club domestic league appearances and goals as of 6 July 2026 ‡ National team caps and goals as of 10 April 2023

Jonathan Alonso Moya Aguilar (born 6 January 1992) is a Costa Rican professional footballer who plays as a forward for Honduran club F.C. Motagua and the Costa Rica national team.

== Club career ==
=== Deportivo Saprissa ===
Born in Monteverde, Puntarenas, Moya graduated with Deportivo Saprissa's youth setup, and made his senior debuts with the reserves in Segunda División, on 3 February 2010, in a match against Cariari.

=== Santos de Guápiles ===
Jonathan was loaned out to Santos de Guápiles in early 2012, and made his debut in the Primera División in a 1–0 home victory over Herediano on 15 January. He scored his first two goals for the team on 1 March, netting a brace in a 0–3 away win against Orión. In the competition of Verano, Jonathan completed sixteen matches, with two goals and provided three assists. Although his team lost their match 1–0 for the semifinals against Deportivo Saprissa, they qualified to the last round after winning the second leg with the same score, this one due to the advantage earned by finishing second in the regular season. Moya participated on the two matches of the final definition against Herediano, and became runner-up after losing the two series.

Once the preseason had concluded, Jonathan debuted in the Campeonato de Invierno on 26 July 2012 in a 2–0 away loss. He scored his first goal on 18 August over San Carlos. The attacker finished the league with fourteen appearances and two goals in total. Then he returned to Saprissa.

=== Deportivo Saprissa ===
Being part of Saprissa, he spent the first half of 2013 with the team of Segunda División. He made his debut on 19 January and scored two goals –one of them from the penalty spot– in a 3–2 victory over Osa. On 24 March, Moya made two goals to Coto Brus. The forward ended his participation with ten appearances and gained 847' minutes of play.

=== Generación Saprissa ===
His team's name changed to Generación Saprissa in early August 2013, and Moya was chosen by the coach Enrique Rivers to face this season. He started with two goals at the 8th and 77th minutes, in the victory 1–4 over Juventud Escazuceña at the Nicolás Masís. During this period, Jonathan became the top scorer by netting ten goals. His team lost the semifinal series against AS Puma.

=== C. S. Uruguay de Coronado ===
While Moya was playing with the second category team, the first squad negotiated with the player Marvin Angulo, from Uruguay de Coronado. Once Angulo was bought on 16 December 2013, the deal established that two member from Saprissa would move to Coronado on loan, so Moya and his team partner Dylan Flores were chosen to close the transfer. Initially, he signed for six months, with a possible extension for the same period of time.

Jonathan debuted for Uruguay on January 11, 2014, reaching the total number of minutes in 1–3 loss against Herediano. His first goal with the "aurinegros" was on 9 February over Pérez Zeledón. Then, Moya scored six goals in three consecutive matches, by hitting the net two times each game over Limón (2–1), Puntarenas (0–2), and Belén (3–0). He ended the season with a tally of ten goals. As a result of his scoring performance, Jonathan was awarded in late May as the top scorer, sharing the prize with the Uruguayan Fabrizio Ronchetti and the Argentine Lucas Gómez.

He was the best player of the team in the 2014 Torneo de Copa (Costa Rican cup), by hitting a net on July 20 over Herediano.

As the start of the Campeonato de Invierno, Moya scored the equaliser 1–1 at the "Fello" Meza against Cartaginés, but it was not enough on the 3–1 loss. He finished the competition with seventeen matches played and reached nine goals.

=== Deportivo Saprissa ===
Due to his performance with Uruguay, on 24 December 2014, his team Deportivo Saprissa decided to bring Moya back in order to face the following championship. He was presented in press conference on 6 January 2015 –same day of his birthday–, by the financial manager Galeano Luconi, along with the other new players Néstor Monge and Andrés Imperiale.

Moya finally made his official debut for the first squad on January 19, 2015, in a match against AS Puma at the Ricardo Saprissa, playing 36' minutes in the 3–2 victory. In the following game, he scored with the head his first goal to give his team the triumph 1–0 over Limón. Jonathan would conclude the season league with eighteen goals. On 29 June, it was revealed that the club Empoli from Italy would have been interested on the forward, however there was not a formal deal.

On 14 August 2015, Moya left his country to perform a ten-day trial in Royal Excel Mouscron from Belgium, as a part of an invitation of the team. He was previewed to return on 24 August, but four days before, his team decided to send him to the club Huesca from Spain.

=== S. D. Huesca ===
Jonathan arrived to the Spanish team on loan, until 30 June 2016, with a buyout clause. He made his debut on 5 September 2015 in a match against Tenerife at the El Alcoraz, after substituting Samu Sáiz at the 62nd minute. Moya reached his first goal on 6 December, in a 1–2 home loss against Mirandés. On 27 January 2016, the team announced his departure, because of the lack of opportunities he had to play, and for arriving eleven days late to the trainings after the pause of the half of the season. Then he returned to Saprissa.

=== Deportivo Saprissa ===
Rapidly, he debuted on 30 January 2016 in a 2–0 away loss against Herediano. Moya only scored three goals in the Campeonato de Verano, over Cartaginés, Limón, and Carmelita.

=== C. F. Universidad de Costa Rica ===
On 28 June 2016, Moya was loaned out for a year to the club Universidad de Costa Rica. He had good appearances as being part of the starting eleven in several matches, in which scored four goals. However, on 30 August, the loan was cancelled by Saprissa and the player was sent to Zirka Kropyvnytsky from Ukraine, in the same condition for a season.

=== F. C. Zirka Kropyvnytskyi ===
He made his debut for Zirka on 11 September 2016, in a league match against Karpaty Lviv, by replacing Artem Sitalo at the 68th minute. Moya scored for first time in the dying minutes over Dnipro, to give his team the 0–1 victory. On 3 March 2017, the attacker asked for his departure and came to a deal to be a free agent. In the process he was close to sign for a club from Israel, but FIFA rules denied the transfer, because it was going to be a third move in the same season. As a consequence, his international pass stayed blocked, without team and without salary until the end of the season. Once it ended, Moya returned to Saprissa.

=== Deportivo Saprissa ===
On 24 May 2017, it was officially confirmed his return to Saprissa, to face the upcoming season. He had to wait until 20 August because of the issues with his international pass, to make his first appearance in the Torneo Apertura. Jonathan replaced Juan Bustos Golobio at the 70th minute and gave an assist to David Ramírez, who scored the goal of the 1–0 victory over Universidad de Costa Rica at the "Fello" Meza. Moya hit a net on 17 September, in the dying minutes over Guadalupe, enough for the 1–0 triumph. He finished the championship with nineteen matches played, seven goals and provided three assists. His team ended trophyless.

As a result of the new players in the team, who have a chance to be part of the official squad at the 2018 World Cup, Moya was relegated to the bench by the coach Vladimir Quesada. Because of that and combined with the fact that his contract with the team was about to expire, there were formal conversations on 5 March with Alajuelense to acquire his services in the next season.

=== FC Anyang ===
After three successful seasons in Liga FPD with Alajuelense, on January 11, 2021, the club announced that Moya would join South Korean team FC Anyang on loan for the rest of the year. Playing in K League 2, the forward registered his third experience outside his native country, as well as the first one in the Asian continent: plus, he became in the process the fourth Costa Rican player to join the South Korean professional football system, after Jeaustin Campos, Elias Aguilar and Marco Ureña. On November 30, 2021, it was announced that Moya had signed a permanent contract with FC Anyang.

=== Hyderabad FC ===
On 12 July 2023, Indian Super League club Hyderabad announced the signing of Moya ahead of the 2023–24 season.

=== Al-Bukiryah ===
On 20 August 2025, Moya joined Saudi First Division League club Al-Bukiryah.

== Career statistics ==
As of match played in December 2023

Club statistics
Club	Season	League			National Cup		Continental		Other		Total	
Club	Season	Division	Apps	Goals	Apps	Goals	Apps	Goals	Apps	Goals	Apps	Goals
Santos (loan)	2011–12	Costa Rican Primera División	16	2	0	0	—		—		20	2
Santos (loan)	2012–13	Costa Rican Primera División	14	2	0	0	—		—		14	2
Santos (loan)	Total		34	4	0	0	0	0	0	0	34	4
Uruguay (loan)	2013–14	Costa Rican Primera División	19	10	0	0	—		—		19	10
Uruguay (loan)	2014–15	Liga FPD	17	9	2	1	—		—		19	10
Uruguay (loan)	Total		36	19	2	1	0	0	0	0	38	20
Saprissa	2014–15	Liga FPD	21	9	0	0	2 (Note: Appearances in the CONCACAF Champions League)	0	—		23	9
Saprissa	2015–16	Liga FPD	18	3	2	0	—		—		20	3
Saprissa	2017–18	Liga FPD	39	12	0	0	—		—		39	12
Saprissa	Total		78	24	2	0	2	0	0	0	82	24
Huesca (loan)	2015–16	Segunda División	7	1	2	0	—		—		9	1
UCR (loan)	2016–17	Liga FPD	10	4	0	0	—		—		10	4
Zirka Kropyvnytskyi (loan)	2016–17	Ukrainian Premier League	11	2	1	0	—		—		12	2
Alajuelense	2018–19	Liga FPD	35	11	0	0	—		—		35	11
Alajuelense	2019–20	Liga FPD	48	15	0	0	—		—		48	15
Alajuelense	2020–21	Liga FPD	17	12	0	0	2 (Note: Appearances in the CONCACAF League)	0	—		19	12
Alajuelense	Total		100	38	0	0	2	0	0	0	102	38
FC Anyang (loan)	2021	K League 2	28	13	1	1	—		1 (Note: Appearance in the 2021 K League 2 promotion play-offs)	1	30	15
FC Angang	2022	K League 2	30	9	0	0	—		3 (Note: Appearances in the 2022 K League 2 promotion play-offs)	0	33	9
FC Angang	2023	K League 2	5	5	0	0	—		—		5	5
FC Angang	Total		35	14	0	0	0	0	3	0	38	14
Hyderabad	2023–24	Indian Super League	7	1	0	0	—		—		7	1
Career totals			346	120	8	2	4	0	4	1	362	123

== International career ==
After representing Costa Rica at under-17 and under-20 levels, Moya made his main squad debut on 14 September 2014, replacing David Ramírez in the dying minutes of a 2–1 win against Guatemala, for the year's Copa Centroamericana.

== Honours ==
Saprissa

- Liga FPD: Apertura 2015, Clausura 2018

Alajuelense

- Liga FPD: Apertura 2020
- CONCACAF League: 2020

Costa Rica

- Copa Centroamericana: 2014
