= Yevhen Past =

Ukrainian footballer

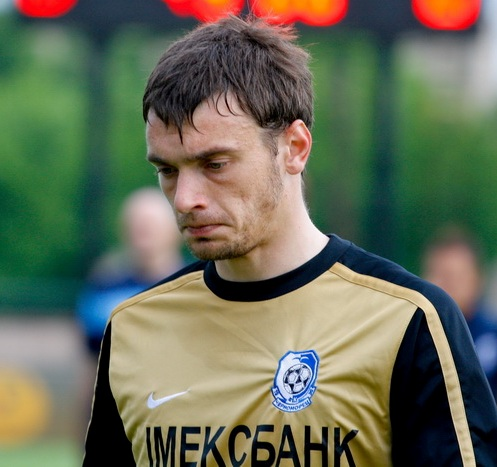
- Past with Chornomorets Odesa

Personal information
- Full name: Yevhen Serhiyovych Past
- Date of birth: 16 March 1988 (age 38)
- Place of birth: Odesa, Soviet Union (now Ukraine)
- Height: 1.88 m (6 ft 2 in)
- Position: Goalkeeper

Youth career
- 2001–2003: Chornomorets Odesa
- 2003–2004: Obriy Nikopol
- 2004–2005: Chornomorets Odesa

Senior career*
Years	Team	Apps	(Gls)
2006–2015	Chornomorets Odesa	57	(0)
2015–2018	Zirka Kropyvnytskyi	79	(0)
2018–2021	Desna Chernihiv	72	(0)
2021	Dnipro-1	4	(0)
2022–2023	Chornomorets Odesa	9	(0)
2023–2024	Veres Rivne	15	(0)
- * Club domestic league appearances and goals as of 20 December 2024

Yevhen Serhiyovych Past (Ukrainian: Євген Сергійович Паст; born 16 March 1988) is a Ukrainian professional footballer who plays as a goalkeeper for Veres Rivne.

== Club career ==
=== Early years ===
He is a product of the Chornomorets Odesa academy and played for the club's reserve squad and youth squad.

=== Chornomorets Odesa ===
Past was born in Odesa, Soviet Union. A Chornomorets Odesa youth product, he initially played for the club's reserves making his first appearance in the 2005–06 season. He made his first-team debut in a Ukrainian Premier League match against SC Tavriya Simferopol on 28 February 2010.

On the season 2010–11 he got promoted to Ukrainian Premier League and in the season 2012–13, he got into the final of Ukrainian Cup against Shakhtar Donetsk.

Yevhen Past got to the Round of 32, of the Europe League in the season 2013–14 and he played 2 games against Lyon.

=== Zirka Kropyvnytskyi ===
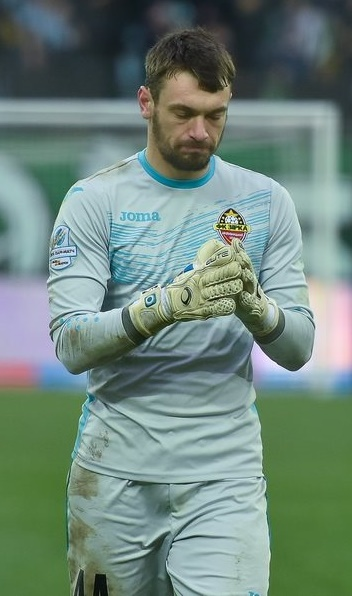
Yevhen Past with Zirka Kropyvnytskyi

In 2015 Past moved to Zirka Kropyvnytskyi and in the season 2015–16 he won the Ukrainian First League.

=== Desna Chernihiv ===
In 2018 Past moved Premier League side FC Desna Chernihiv. Here he found Andriy Mostovyi that he played with him in Zirka Kropyvnytskyi.

In the 2019–20 season Past saved a penalty by Benjamin Verbič in a Ukrainian Premier League match against Dynamo Kyiv at the Chernihiv Stadium. He also saved a penalty by Vitaliy Havrysh in a Championship round match against Kolos Kovalivka helping his club win 2–0. He saved another penalty in the Championship round on 6 June 2020, from by Shakhtar Donetsk's Marlos.

In the 2019–20 season he was the goalkeeper with most clean sheets in 11 matches together with the international Ukrainian goalkeeper Andriy Pyatov. He was also the goalkeeper with most minutes played in 30 games, in the 2019–20 season and included in the best squad of the Ukrainian Premier League of the season 2019–20 season.

Past with the club of Chernihiv qualified for the first time in the history of the club for the Europa League third qualifying round. On 14 August 2020, Past extended his contract with Desna for two years.

On 24 September Past played again in UEFA Europa League, he was included as the first goalkeeper in the team of Desna Chernihiv against VfL Wolfsburg for the Europa League third qualifying round at the AOK Stadion. On 6 December 2020 during the winning victory of 1–0 against Vorskla Poltava at the Stadion Yuri Gagarin, Past riched 150 caps in Ukrainian Premier League. Past got the 7th place in the Ukrainian Footballer of the Year in 2020 and he was the best goalkeeper in Ukraine

On 5 July 2021, after three amazing years he ended the cooperation with FC Desna Chernihiv.

=== Dnipro-1 ===
On 5 July 2021 he signed two years contract with Dnipro-1 in Ukrainian Premier League.

=== Chornomorets Odesa ===
In January 2022, he moved Chornomorets Odesa, where on 22 January 2022, he made his debut with the new club in the friendly match against Prishtina.

== Outside of professional football ==
In March 2022, during the Siege of Chernihiv, Past helped to provide Chernihiv defenders with thermal underwear. The footballer also transferred to the account of volunteers the funds that will be spent for the needs of the Armed Forces.

== Career statistics ==
=== Club ===
As of match played 20 December 2024

Appearances and goals by club, season and competition
Club	Season	League			Cup		Continental		Other		Total	
Club	Season	Division	Apps	Goals	Apps	Goals	Apps	Goals	Apps	Goals	Apps	Goals
Chornomorets Odesa	2008–09	Ukrainian Premier League	0	0	0	0	—		—		0	0
Chornomorets Odesa	2009–10	Ukrainian Premier League	12	0	0	0	—		—		12	0
Chornomorets Odesa	2010–11	Ukrainian First League	29	0	0	0	—		—		29	0
Chornomorets Odesa	2011–12	Ukrainian Premier League	5	0	0	0	—		—		5	0
Chornomorets Odesa	2012–13	Ukrainian Premier League	1	0	0	0	—		—		1	0
Chornomorets Odesa	2013–14	Ukrainian Premier League	1	0	1	0	2 (Note: Appearance(s) in UEFA Europa League)	0	0	0	4	0
Chornomorets Odesa	2014–15	Ukrainian Premier League	9	0	4	0	0	0	—		13	0
Chornomorets Odesa	Total		57	0	5	0	2	0	0	0	64	0
Zirka Kropyvnytskyi	2015–16	Ukrainian First League	19	0	2	0	—		—		21	0
Zirka Kropyvnytskyi	2016–17	Ukrainian Premier League	28	0	0	0	—		—		28	0
Zirka Kropyvnytskyi	2017–18	Ukrainian Premier League	32	0	0	0	—		1 (Note: Appearance(s) in Relegation play-offs)	0	33	0
Zirka Kropyvnytskyi	Total		79	0	2	0	0	0	1	0	82	0
Desna Chernihiv	2018–19	Ukrainian Premier League	21	0	0	0	—		—		21	0
Desna Chernihiv	2019–20	Ukrainian Premier League	30	0	1	0	—		—		31	0
Desna Chernihiv	2020–21	Ukrainian Premier League	21	0	1	0	1	0	—		23	0
Desna Chernihiv	Total		72	0	2	0	1	0	0	0	75	0
Dnipro-1	2021–22	Ukrainian Premier League	4	0	0	0	—		—		4	0
Dnipro-1	Total		4	0	0	0	0	0	0	0	4	0
Chornomorets Odesa	2021–22	Ukrainian Premier League	0	0	0	0	—		—		0	0
Chornomorets Odesa	2022–23	Ukrainian Premier League	9	0	0	0	—		—		9	0
Chornomorets Odesa	Total		9	0	0	0	0	0	0	0	9	0
Veres Rivne	2023–24	Ukrainian Premier League	15	0	0	0	—		—		15	0
Career total			239	0	9	0	3	0	1	0	254	0

== Honours ==
Chornomorets Odesa

- Ukrainian First League: 2010–11
- Ukrainian Cup runners-up: 2012–13
- Ukrainian Super Cup runners-up: 2013

Zirka Kropyvnytskyi

- Ukrainian First League: 2015–16

Individual

- Most clean sheets in Ukrainian Premier League: 2019–20 (shared with Andriy Pyatov)
