= Oleksandr Kucherenko =

Moldovan footballer

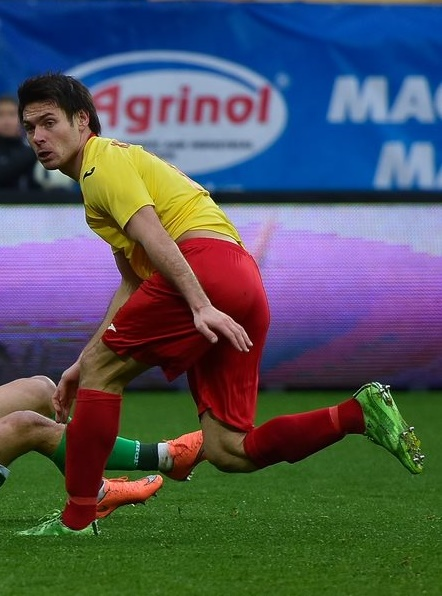

Personal information
- Full name: Oleksandr Yevhenovych Kucherenko
- Date of birth: 1 October 1991 (age 35)
- Place of birth: Sloviansk, Ukraine
- Height: 1.84 m (6 ft 0 in)
- Position: Defensive midfielder

Team information
- Current team: Lokomotiv Tashkent
- Number: 18

Youth career
- Slovkhlib Slovyansk

Senior career*
Years	Team	Apps	(Gls)
2009–2010	Slovkhlib Slovyansk	2	(0)
2011	Avanhard Kramatorsk	14	(1)
2011–2013	Nistru Otaci	41	(3)
2013–2014	Costuleni	27	(0)
2014	Veris Chișinău	14	(2)
2015–2017	Zirka Kropyvnytskyi	62	(8)
2017–2021	Inhulets Petrove	92	(5)
2021–2022	Volyn Lutsk	13	(1)
2022–2023	Inhulets Petrove	26	(1)
2023–2024	Veres Rivne	24	(0)
2024	Metallurg Bekabad	13	(1)
2025	Dinamo Samarqand	25	(1)
2026–	Lokomotiv Tashkent	11	(0)

International career^{‡}
2013	Moldova U19	1	(0)
- * Club domestic league appearances and goals as of 29 July 2026 ‡ National team caps and goals as of 24 August 2017

Oleksandr Yevhenovych Kucherenko (Ukrainian: Олександр Євгенович Кучеренко; Romanian: Alexandru Cucerenco; born 1 October 1991) is a professional footballer who plays as a defensive midfielder for Uzbekistan Super League club Lokomotiv Tashkent. Born in Ukraine, he has represented Moldova at youth level.

== Career ==
Kucherenko is the product of his native Slavkhlib Slovyansk. He played for Avanhard Kramatorsk, appearing in Ukrainian Second League matches. During the 2011–2012 transfer winter window he moved to play in Moldova until the end of 2014.

== Controversy ==
In 2012 Kucherenko was signed for FC Nistru Otaci, claiming that he was a citizen of Moldova born in 1994. The next year, he was called up to play for the Moldova under-19 team, making one appearance. Previously, however, he had presented himself as a Ukrainian citizen born in 1991. For these reasons, in the end of 2014 by the Football Federation of Moldova launched an investigation, but the findings were inconclusive.
