= Andriy Hlushchenko =

Ukrainian goalkeeper and coach

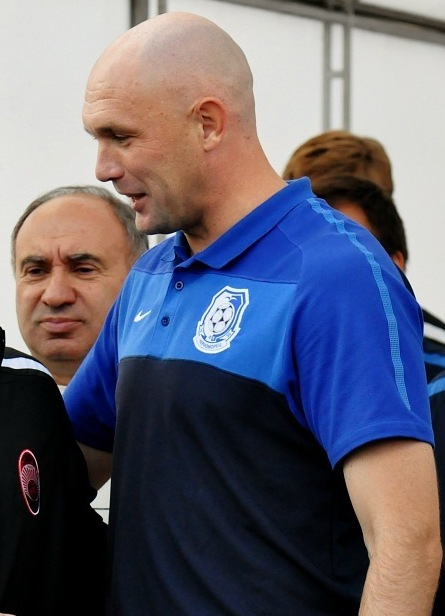

Personal information
- Full name: Andriy Oleksandrovych Hlushchenko
- Date of birth: 18 March 1974 (age 52)
- Place of birth: Orikhiv, Ukrainian SSR
- Height: 1.88 m (6 ft 2 in)
- Position: Goalkeeper

Team information
- Current team: Chornomorets Odesa (goalkeeping coach)

Senior career*
Years	Team	Apps	(Gls)
1992–1998	Torpedo Zaporizhzhia	51	(0)
1998–2000	Zirka Kirovohrad	26	(0)
1998–2000	→ Zirka-2 Kirovohrad	21	(0)
2000–2008	Metalurh Zaporizhzhia	141	(0)
2000–2004	→ Metalurh-2 Zaporizhzhia	9	(0)
2000	→ SSSOR-Metalurh Zaporizhzhia	1	(0)
2008–2009	Illichivets Mariupol	8	(0)
2011–2012	Chornomorets Odesa	0	(0)
Total		257	(0)

Managerial career
- 2009–2011: Metalurh Zaporizhzhia (goalkeeping coach)
- 2011–2014: Chornomorets Odesa (goalkeeping coach)
- 2014–2015: Gabala (goalkeeping coach)
- 2016–2018: Chornomorets Odesa (goalkeeping coach)
- 2018–2020: Astana (goalkeeping coach)
- 2020–2021: Shakhtyor Soligorsk (goalkeeping coach)
- 2022–2024: Chornomorets Odesa (goalkeeping coach)
- 2025: LNZ Cherkasy (assistant coach)
- 2026–: Chornomorets Odesa (goalkeeping coach)
- * Club domestic league appearances and goals

Andriy Oleksandrovych Hlushchenko (Ukrainian: Андрій Олександрович Глущенко, romanized: Andrii Oleksandrovych Hlushchenko; born 18 March 1974) is a Ukrainian former footballer who played as a goalkeeper. He is currently a goalkeeping coach at Chornomorets Odesa.

== Career ==
He played at Torpedo Zaporizhzhia, Zirka Kirovohrad, Metalurh Zaporizhzhia, llychivets Mariupol and Chornomorets Odesa and was also a goalkeeper coach at Metalurh Zaporizhzhia.

Andriy announced his retirement as a professional goalkeeper in the spring of 2009. Altogether, he played in 226 games in the Ukrainian Premier League in which he allowed 323 goals with a 1.429 GAA (goals against average).

=== Goalkeeping coach ===
Hlushchenko then was a goalkeeping coach at Metalurh Zaporizhzhia in 2009–2011. After that, he joined Chornomorets Odesa in the same role on 24 Mar 2011, and was then also listed as a player for the 2011–12 season.

From 2016 to 2018, for the second time in his career Hlushchenko worked as a goalkeeping coach at Chornomorets Odesa.

Since January 2022, he joined Chornomorets Odesa for the third time in his career as a goalkeeping coach.

Since January 2026, Hlushchenko joined Chornomorets Odesa for the fourth time in his career as a goalkeeping coach.
