= Mykyta Zhukov =

Ukrainian footballer

Personal information
- Full name: Mykyta Serhiyovych Zhukov
- Date of birth: 19 March 1995 (age 31)
- Place of birth: Dniprodzerzhyns'k, Ukraine
- Height: 1.80 m (5 ft 11 in)
- Position: Midfielder

Team information
- Current team: Hirnyk-Sport
- Number: 99

Youth career
- 2008–2012: FC Inter Dnipropetrovsk

Senior career*
Years	Team	Apps	(Gls)
2012–2014	Stal Dniprodzerzhynsk	6	(0)
2014	Olimpik Petrykivka	4	(2)
2015	Kremin Kremenchuk	2	(0)
2015	Oleksandriya	0	(0)
2016	Kolos Zachepylivka	5	(0)
2016–2018	Inhulets Petrove	7	(1)
2016–2018	→ Inhulets-2 Petrove	18	(4)
2017	→ Zirka Kropyvnytskyi (loan)	9	(0)
2018–2019	Tavriya Simferopol	43	(5)
2020–2021	Nikopol	20	(5)
2021	Skoruk Tomakivka	1	(1)
2022–2023	Nyva Vinnytsia	10	(2)
2023–	Hirnyk-Sport Horishni Plavni	9	(0)
- * Club domestic league appearances and goals as of 25 September 2023

Mykyta Zhukov (Ukrainian: Микита Сергійович Жуков; born 19 March 1995) is a professional Ukrainian football midfielder who plays for Hirnyk-Sport.

== Career ==
Zhukov is a product of the FC Inter Dnipropetrovsk sportive youth school in his native Dnipropetrovsk Oblast. He spent time with different Ukrainian teams in the lower or amateur leagues.

In summer 2016 Zhukov signed a contract with the Ukrainian First League FC Inhulets Petrove and made his debut for the main team squad on 18 September 2016 in a match against FC Ternopil.

From February 2017 he played on loan for FC Zirka Kropyvnytskyi and made his debut in the Ukrainian Premier League for Zirka on 26 February 2017, playing in a match against FC Dnipro.
