= Roman Popov (footballer) =

Ukrainian footballer

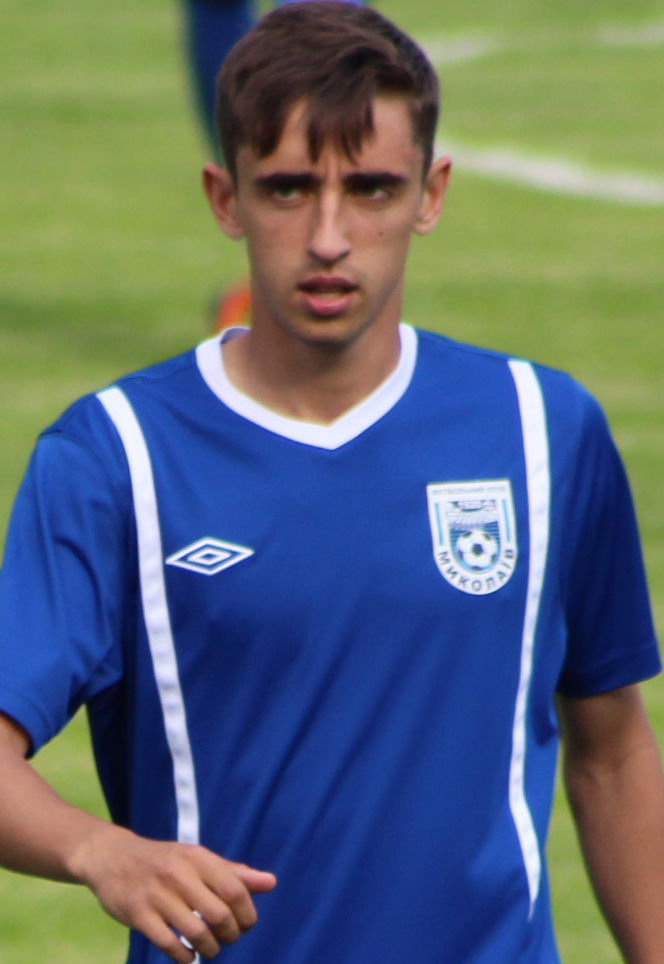

Personal information
- Full name: Roman Olehovych Popov
- Date of birth: 29 June 1995 (age 31)
- Place of birth: Mykolaiv, Ukraine
- Height: 1.81 m (5 ft 11 in)
- Position: Right-back

Youth career
- 2008–2012: Mykolaiv

Senior career*
Years	Team	Apps	(Gls)
2012–2015	Mykolaiv	7	(0)
2015	Metalurh Zaporizhzhia	15	(0)
2016–2017	Zirka Kropyvnytskyi	19	(1)
2017–2019	Mykolaiv	71	(4)
2020	Chornomorets Odesa	0	(0)
2020–2021	Mykolaiv	15	(0)
- * Club domestic league appearances and goals as of 26 June 2021

Roman Olehovych Popov (Ukrainian: Роман Олегович Попов; born 29 June 1995) is a Ukrainian footballer who plays as a right-back.

Popov is product of MFC Mykolaiv youth team system. His first trainer was Serhiy Burymenko.

He made his debut for Metalurh Zaporizhzhia in the Ukrainian Premier League in a match against FC Dynamo Kyiv on 30 May 2015.
