= Jaguapitã =

Coordinates: 23°07′S 51°33′W

- Municipality
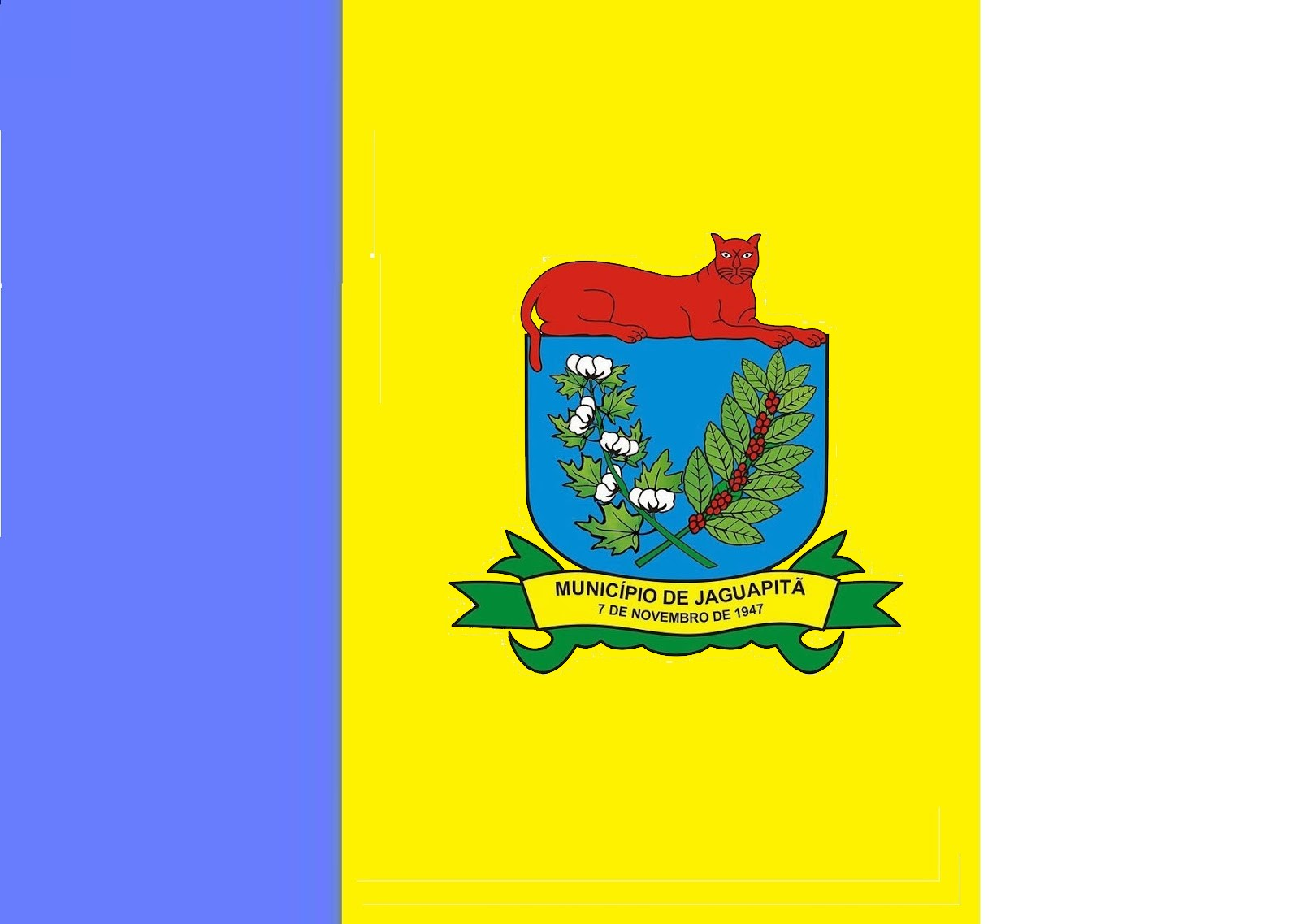
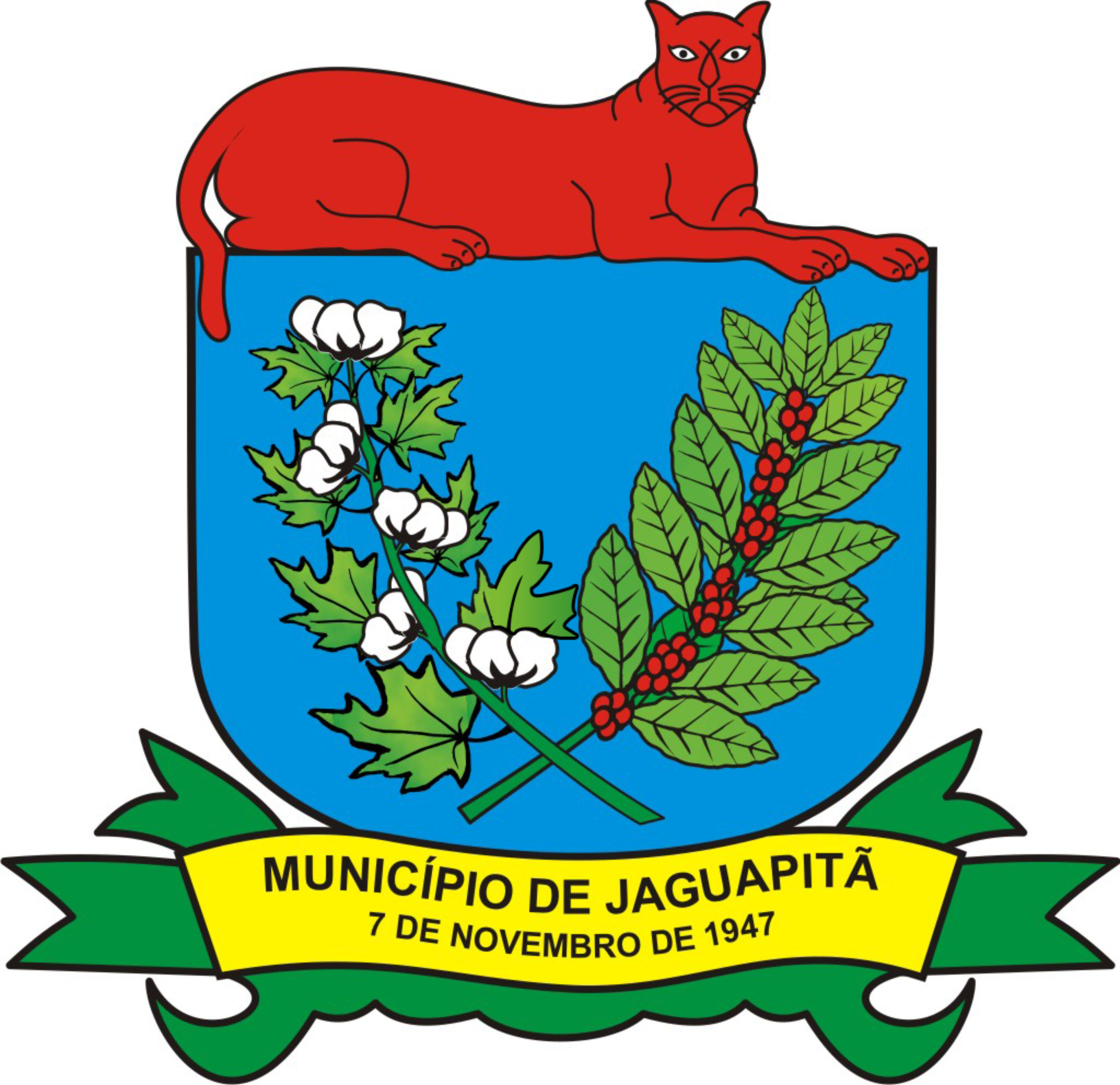
- Flag Coat of arms
- Interactive map of Jaguapitã
- Country: Brazil
- Region: Southern
- State: Paraná
- Mesoregion: Noroeste Paranaense

Population (2020)
  - Total: 13,742
- Time zone: UTC−3 (BRT)

Jaguapitã is a municipality in the state of Paraná in the Southern Region of Brazil.

== See also ==
- List of municipalities in Paraná
