= Artem Kulishenko =

Ukrainian footballer

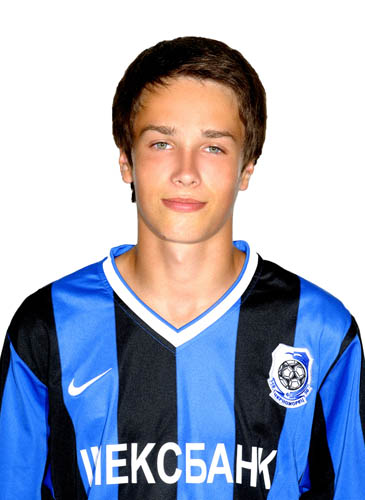

Personal information
- Full name: Artem Ruslanovych Kulishenko
- Date of birth: 15 April 1994 (age 32)
- Place of birth: Odesa, Ukraine
- Height: 1.79 m (5 ft 10 in)
- Position: Striker

Youth career
- 2007–2013: Chornomorets Odesa

Senior career*
Years	Team	Apps	(Gls)
2010–2014	Chornomorets Odesa	0	(0)
2010–2011	→ Chornomorets-2 Odesa	17	(5)
2014	→ Daugava Daugavpils (loan)	0	(0)
2015–2016	Real Pharma Odesa	35	(11)
2017	Mykolaiv	8	(0)
2017	→ Mykolaiv-2	1	(0)
2017	Zhemchuzhyna Odesa	15	(0)
2018	Östavalls IF	9	(3)
2019	Real Pharma Odesa	6	(0)
2020	Masis	11	(1)
202?–2023	Fränsta IK		

International career
2011	Ukraine U17	2	(0)
- * Club domestic league appearances and goals

Artem Ruslanovych Kulishenko (Ukrainian: Артем Русланович Кулішенко; born 15 April 1994) is a Ukrainian former professional football striker.

He is a product of FC Chornomorets Youth Sportive school. His first trainer was Vitaliy Hotsulyak. In March 2014 he signed one year on loan contract with Latvian football club Daugava Daugavpils.
