= Oleksandr Kochura =

Ukrainian footballer

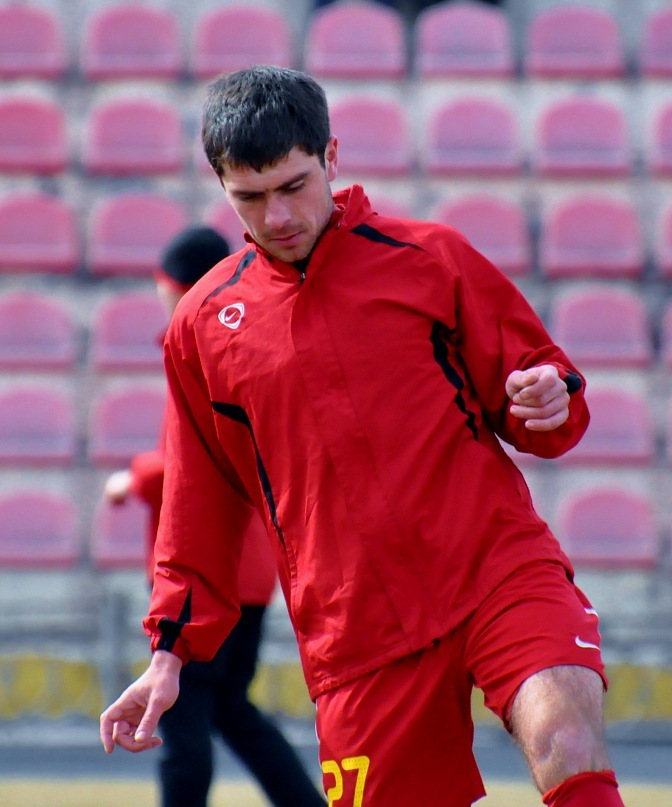

Personal information
- Full name: Oleksandr Hryhorovych Kochura
- Date of birth: 7 March 1986 (age 40)
- Place of birth: Kirovohrad, Ukrainian SSR
- Height: 1.80 m (5 ft 11 in)
- Position: Midfielder

Team information
- Current team: Zirka Kropyvnytskyi (assistant)

Youth career
- 1998–1999: Zirka Kirovohrad
- 1999–2003: Olimpik Kirovohrad
- 2003–2004: Zirka Kirovohrad

Senior career*
Years	Team	Apps	(Gls)
2004–2006	Zirka Kirovohrad	28	(1)
2007	Naftovyk Dolyna	1	(0)
2007	Zirka Kirovohrad	8	(2)
2007–2008	Olimpik Kirovohrad	14	(10)
2008–2009	Zirka Kirovohrad	38	(11)
2010	Oleksandriya	11	(0)
2010–2012	Zirka Kirovohrad	56	(26)
2012	Obolon Kyiv	19	(2)
2013–2016	Zirka Kropyvnytskyi	22	(2)
Total		197	(54)

Managerial career
- 2017–2018: Zirka Kropyvnytskyi (U-21)
- 2018–: Zirka Kropyvnytskyi (assistant)
- * Club domestic league appearances and goals

Oleksandr Kochura (Ukrainian: Олександр Григорович Кочура; born 7 March 1986 in Kirovohrad, Ukrainian SSR) is a retired professional Ukrainian football midfielder and current football manager.

== Career ==
Kochura is a product of FC Zirka and FC Olimpik sportive schools in his native city Kropyvnytskyi. He spent time with different Ukrainian teams that play mainly in the Ukrainian First League, and in March 2013 he returned to FC Zirka.
