= Serhiy Kernozhytskyi =

Ukrainian footballer (born 1997)

Personal information
- Full name: Serhiy Yuriyovych Kernozhytskyi
- Date of birth: 23 June 1997 (age 29)
- Place of birth: Lukasheve, Zaporizhzhia Oblast, Ukraine
- Height: 1.69 m (5 ft 6 1/2 in)
- Position: Midfielder

Team information
- Current team: Metalurh Zaporizhya
- Number: 2

Youth career
- 2010–2014: FC Kosmos Zaporizhya

Senior career*
Years	Team	Apps	(Gls)
2014–2017	Zirka Kropyvnytskyi	1	(0)
2014	→FC Zirka-2 Kirovohrad	?	(?)
2017–	Metalurh Zaporizhya	19	(2)
- * Club domestic league appearances and goals as of 16 September 2017

Serhiy Kernozhytskyi (Ukrainian: Сергій Юрійович Керножицький; born 23 June 1997) is a professional Ukrainian football midfielder who plays for Metalurh Zaporizhya.

Kernozhytskyi is a product of FC Kosmos Zaporizhya youth sportive school. He made his debut for FC Zirka entering as a second-half substitute against FC Helios Kharkiv on 3 October 2015 in the Ukrainian First League.
