= Artem Shchedryi =

Ukrainian footballer

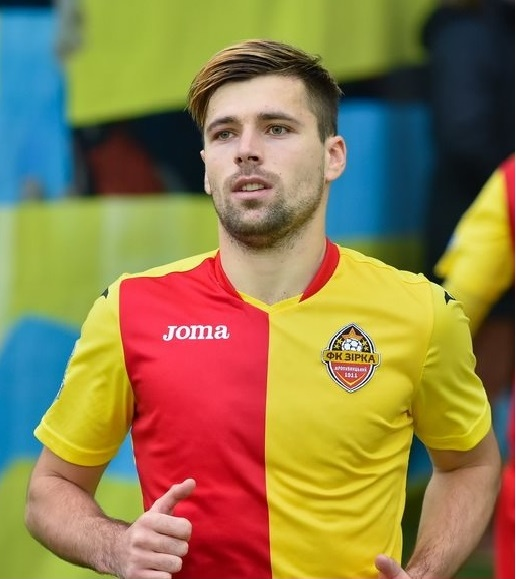

Personal information
- Full name: Artem Albertovych Shchedryi
- Date of birth: 9 November 1992 (age 34)
- Place of birth: Beryslav, Ukraine
- Height: 1.83 m (6 ft 0 in)
- Position: Left midfielder

Team information
- Current team: FC Hegelmann
- Number: 45

Youth career
- 2006–2008: Olimpik Donetsk
- 2008–2009: Dynamo Kyiv

Senior career*
Years	Team	Apps	(Gls)
2009–2011	Dynamo Kyiv	0	(0)
2009–2011	→ Dynamo-2 Kyiv	26	(0)
2012–2013	Volyn Lutsk	1	(0)
2014–2017	Zirka Kropyvnytskyi	77	(9)
2017	Oleksandriya	0	(0)
2018	Olimpik Donetsk	7	(1)
2018	Dnipro-1	15	(0)
2019–2021	Inhulets Petrove	51	(2)
2021–2022	Kryvbas Kryvyi Rih	19	(6)
2022	→ Levadia Tallinn (loan)	3	(1)
2022–	Prostějov	6	(0)
2023	Panevėžys	27	(3)
2024–	Hegelmann	59	(4)

International career^{‡}
2008	Ukraine U17	6	(0)
2010–2011	Ukraine U19	5	(0)
- * Club domestic league appearances and goals as of 2 March 2026 ‡ National team caps and goals as of 3 April 2022

Artem Albertovych Shchedryi (Ukrainian: Артем Альбертович Щедрий; born 9 November 1992) is a Ukrainian professional footballer who plays as a left midfielder for Lithuanian club FK Panevėžys.

== Club career ==
=== Early years ===
He is a product of Olimpik Donetsk and Dynamo Kyiv academies.

=== Volyn Lutsk ===
Shchedryi made his debut for Volyn Lutsk entering as a second-half substitute against Metalurh Zaporizhzhia on 27 April 2013 in the Ukrainian Premier League.

== Honours ==
Zirka Kropyvnytskyi

- Ukrainian First League: 2015–16

Dnipro-1

- Ukrainian First League: 2018–19

FCI Levadia

- Estonian Supercup: 2022

Panevėžys

- A Lygaː 2023
