= Oleksiy Zbun =

Ukrainian footballer

Personal information
- Full name: Oleksiy Oleksandrovych Zbun
- Date of birth: 9 June 1997 (age 29)
- Place of birth: Sobolivka, Zhytomyr Oblast, Ukraine
- Height: 1.79 m (5 ft 10 1/2 in)
- Position: Midfielder

Youth career
- 2012–2014: BVUFK Brovary

Senior career*
Years	Team	Apps	(Gls)
2015	Shpolatekhahro	5	(1)
2015–2018	Zirka Kropyvnytskyi	34	(2)
2019	Torpedo Minsk	9	(0)
2019–2020	Hirnyk-Sport Horishni Plavni	37	(3)
2021–2022	Kryvbas Kryvyi Rih	19	(4)
2022	Džiugas Telšiai	15	(4)
2023	Sūduva	24	(4)
2023–2025	Hebar	42	(3)
2025–2026	Elana Toruń	20	(1)

International career
2017–2018	Ukraine U21	2	(0)
- * Club domestic league appearances and goals as of 19:34, 3 June 2026 (UTC)

Oleksiy Zbun (Ukrainian: Олексій Олександрович Збунь; born 9 June 1997) is a Ukrainian professional footballer who plays as a midfielder.

== Career ==
Zbun is a product of Brovary youth sport school system. He continued his career in the amateur club Shpolatekhahro from Shpola in Cherkasy Oblast, but in July 2015 signed contract with FC Zirka Kirovohrad.

He made his debut for Zirka as a second-half substitute in a league match against Dnipro on 1 April 2017.
