= Pavlo Kutas =

Ukrainian footballer

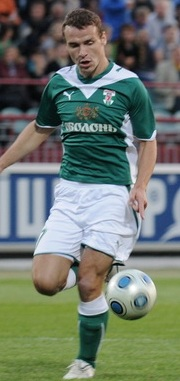

Personal information
- Full name: Pavlo Vitaliyovych Kutas
- Date of birth: 3 September 1982 (age 44)
- Place of birth: Kyiv, Ukrainian SSR
- Height: 1.78 m (5 ft 10 in)
- Position: Defender

Youth career
- 1998–1999: Dynamo Kyiv

Senior career*
Years	Team	Apps	(Gls)
1998–2001	Dynamo Kyiv	0	(0)
1998–2000	→ Dynamo-3 Kyiv	33	(3)
1999–2000	→ Dynamo-2 Kyiv	25	(1)
2001	→ Zakarpattia Uzhhorod (loan)	10	(0)
2001	→ Zakarpattia-2 Uzhhorod (loan)	10	(0)
2002–2005	Obolon Kyiv	92	(2)
2002–2005	→ Obolon-2 Kyiv	4	(0)
2005–2007	Dynamo Bryansk	91	(7)
2008–2009	SKA-Energiya Khabarovsk	27	(0)
2010–2011	Obolon Kyiv	29	(0)
2011–2015	Chornomorets Odesa	70	(0)
2015–2016	Hoverla Uzhhorod	14	(0)
Medal record
Men's football
Representing Ukraine
UEFA European Under-18 Championship
Runner-up	2000 Germany
- * Club domestic league appearances and goals as of 20 January 2016

Pavlo Kutas (Ukrainian: Павло Віталійович Кутас; Hungarian: Pál Kutas) (born 3 September 1982) is a Ukrainian former footballer of Hungarian ethnicity who played as a defender.
