= Bruninho (footballer, born 1997) =

Brazilian footballer

Personal information
- Full name: Bruno Vieira de Souza
- Date of birth: 12 August 1997 (age 29)
- Place of birth: Brazil
- Height: 1.80 m (5 ft 11 in)
- Position: Midfielder

Youth career
- Sobradinho

Senior career*
Years	Team	Apps	(Gls)
201?–2016	Sobradinho	?	(?)
2017	Zirka Kropyvnytskyi	2	(0)
2018	Atlantas Klaipėda	1	(0)
2018	Volyn Lutsk	0	(0)
- * Club domestic league appearances and goals as of 22 February 2019

Bruno Vieira de Souza (born 12 August 1997), commonly known as Bruninho, is a Brazilian footballer who plays as a midfielder.

== Career ==
Bruninho began his career in the Sobradinho Esporte Clube from Brazilian Federal District. In September 2016 he transferred to Ukraine and in January 2017 Bruninho signed a contract with the Ukrainian Premier League FC Zirka. In January 2018 he left Ukrainian club.

On 29 March 2018, Bruninho signed 2,5 years contract with Lithuanian club Atlantas Klaipėda.

On 20 August 2018, he returned to Ukraine and signed for First League club Volyn Lutsk.
