= Denys Aleksandrov =

Ukrainian professional footballer

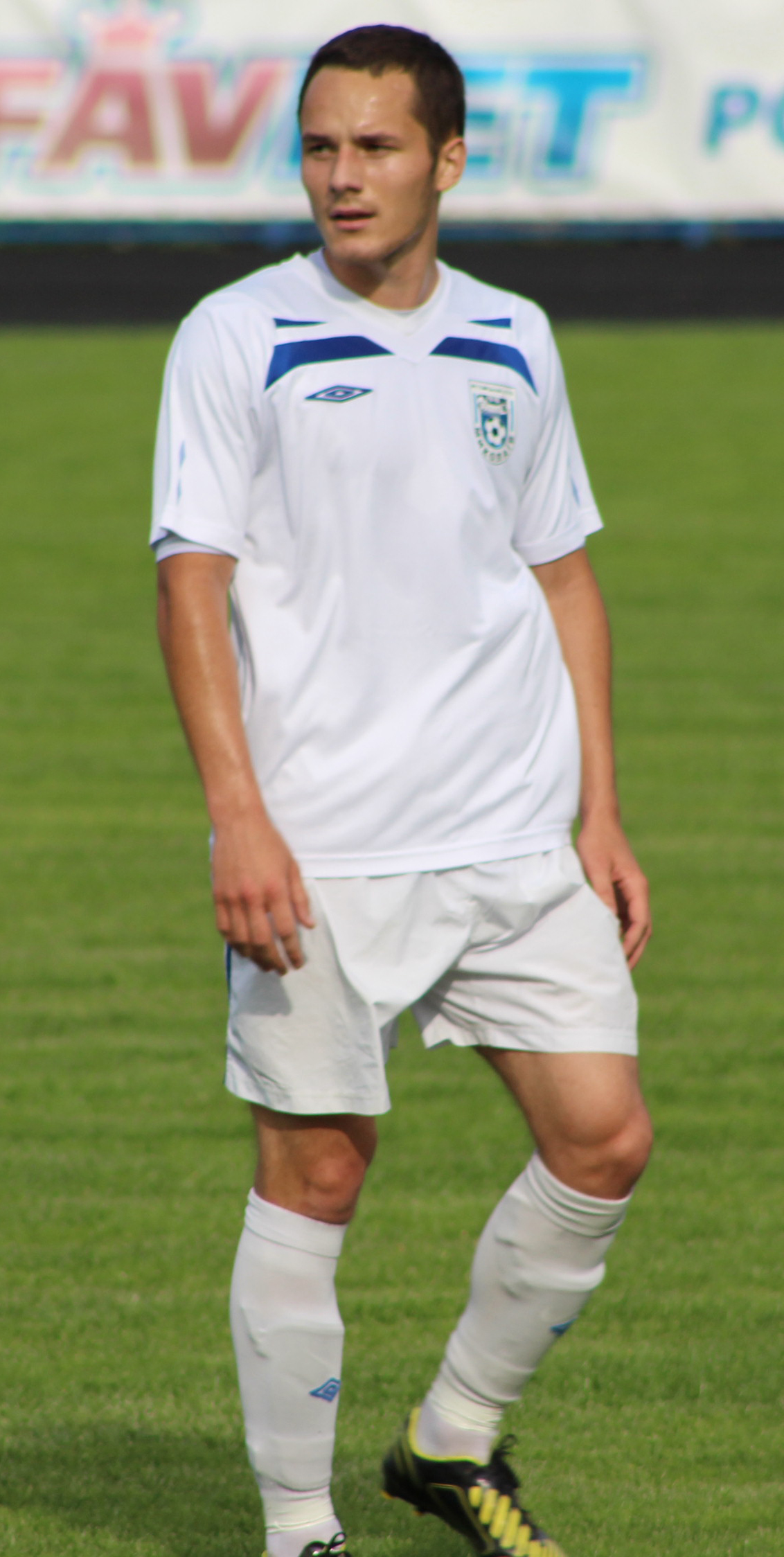
- Aleksandrov in 2014

Personal information
- Full name: Denys Olehovych Aleksandrov
- Date of birth: 5 May 1992 (age 34)
- Place of birth: Odesa, Ukraine
- Height: 1.78 m (5 ft 10 in)
- Position: Forward

Youth career
- 2005–2010: Chornomorets Odesa

Senior career*
Years	Team	Apps	(Gls)
2010–2014	Chornomorets Odesa	0	(0)
2010–2011	→ Chornomorets-2 Odesa	20	(3)
2013	→ Slavia Mozyr (loan)	7	(0)
2014	MFC Mykolaiv	8	(0)
2014–2015	Hirnyk-Sport Komsomolsk	23	(2)
Total		58	(5)

International career
2012	Ukraine U20	1	(0)
- * Club domestic league appearances and goals

Denys Olehovych Aleksandrov (Ukrainian: Денис Олегович Александров; born 5 May 1992) is a Ukrainian retired footballer who played as a forward.
