= Rinar Valeyev =

Ukrainian footballer

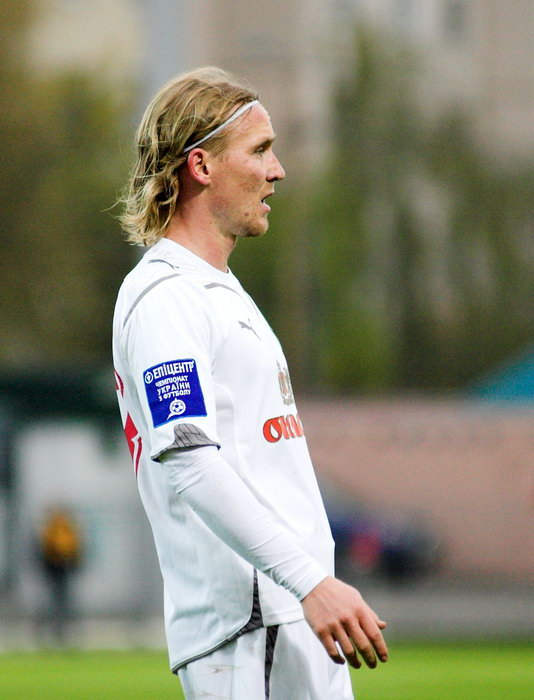
- Valeyev in 2009

Personal information
- Full name: Rinar Salavatovych Valeyev
- Date of birth: 22 August 1987 (age 39)
- Place of birth: Odesa, Ukrainian SSR
- Height: 1.73 m (5 ft 8 in)
- Position: Midfielder

Youth career
- 1993–2004: Chornomorets Odesa
- 2005: De Graafschap

Senior career*
Years	Team	Apps	(Gls)
2005–2006	Syhnal Odesa		
2006	Ivan Odesa		
2007–2009	Chornomorets Odesa	24	(2)
2008–2009	→ Stal Alchevsk (loan)	24	(1)
2009–2010	Obolon Kyiv	28	(1)
2010–2013	Kryvbas Kryvyi Rih	68	(3)
2013–2014	Chornomorets Odesa	5	(0)
2014	Irtysh Pavlodar	13	(1)
2015	Illichivets Mariupol	9	(0)
2016	Hirnyk Kryvyi Rih	5	(0)
2016	Dacia Chișinău	0	(0)
2016	Illichivets Mariupol	9	(0)
2017	Isloch Minsk Raion	23	(3)
2018	Shevardeni-1906 Tbilisi	16	(0)
2019	Olimpik Donetsk	9	(0)
2019–2020	Obolon Kyiv	20	(0)
2020–2021	Chornomorets Odesa	14	(0)
2021–2022	Peremoha Dnipro	17	(6)
2022	MSV Düsseldorf	3	(0)
2022–2023	FSV Duisburg	15	(4)
- * Club domestic league appearances and goals as of 31 December 2022

Rinar Salavatovych Valeyev (Ukrainian: Рінар Салаватович Валєєв; born 22 August 1987) is a Ukrainian former professional football midfielder.

== Career ==
He joined Chornomorets during the winter transfer window, in January 2007, on a three-year contract. His debut for Stal Alchevsk came on 23 August 2008 in a 3–1 defeat of FC Knyazha Schaslyve. He played for Illichivets Mariupol.

His older brother, Ruslan Valeyev is also a football player, who played for Chornomorets during the 2007–08 season together with Rinar.
