= Federico Pereyra (footballer) =

Argentine footballer

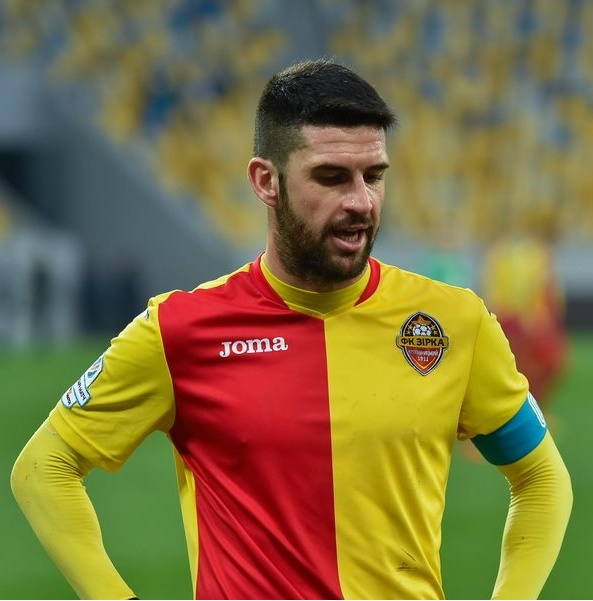
- Pereyra with Zirka Kropyvnytskyi in 2016

Personal information
- Full name: Federico Hernán Pereyra
- Date of birth: January 4, 1989 (age 37)
- Place of birth: Río Cuarto, Argentina
- Height: 1.79 m (5 ft 10 in)
- Position: Defender

Youth career
- River Plate

Senior career*
Years	Team	Apps	(Gls)
2008–2009	Villa Santa Brígida	–	(–)
2009–2010	ASIL Lysi	13	(1)
2010–2011	Cerro Reyes	16	(0)
2011–2012	Central Córdoba SdE	25	(2)
2012–2013	Juventud Unida Universitario	28	(2)
2013–2014	Tristán Suárez	31	(1)
2014–2015	Blooming	33	(6)
2015–2016	The Strongest	36	(0)
2016–2017	Zirka Kropyvnytskyi	22	(2)
2017	Karpaty Lviv	4	(0)
2018–2019	Huachipato	42	(4)
2020–2022	Coquimbo Unido	72	(2)
2023–2024	San Luis	57	(1)
2025	Deportes Temuco	27	(0)
- * Club domestic league appearances and goals as of 21 November 2025

Federico Hernán Pereyra (born January 4, 1989, in Río Cuarto, Argentina) is an Argentine naturalized Chilean footballer who plays as a defender.

== Career ==
During his professional career he has played for clubs in five countries including ASIL Lysi in Chipre, Cerro Reyes in Spain, Central Córdoba, Juventud Unida Universitario and Tristán Suárez in his native country, as well as Bolivian sides Blooming and The Strongest and Chilean sides Huachipato and Coquimbo Unido.

Pereyra signed with Deportes Temuco for the 2025 season.

== Personal life ==
He is the younger brother of the Argentine former footballer Guillermo Pereyra.

Pereyra naturalized Chilean by residence. His first son was born in Coquimbo, Chile.

== Club career statistics ==
Club performance			League		Cup		League Cup		Total	
Season	Club	League	Apps	Goals	Apps	Goals	Apps	Goals	Apps	Goals
League		League Cup			Domestic Cup		Total			
2010/11	Cerro Reyes	Primera B Metropolitana	16	0	-	-	-	-	16	0
2011/12	Central Córdoba	Torneo Federal A	?	2	-	-	-	-	?	2
2012/13	Juventud Unida de San Miguel	Torneo Federal A	28	2	-	-	-	-	28	2
2013/14	Tristán Suárez	Segunda División B	31	1	-	-	-	-	31	1
2014/15	Blooming	Liga de Fútbol Profesional Boliviano	33	6	-	-	-	-	33	6
2015/16	The Strongest	Liga de Fútbol Profesional Boliviano	36	0	4	1	-	-	6	1
Total			110	11	4	1	-	-	114	12

== Honours ==
Coquimbo Unido

- Primera B (1): 2021
