= Oleksandr Zozulya =

Ukrainian footballer

Personal information
- Full name: Oleksandr Olehovych Zozulya
- Date of birth: 11 April 1996 (age 30)
- Place of birth: Kirovohrad, Ukraine
- Height: 1.84 m (6 ft 1/2 in)
- Position: Defender

Team information
- Current team: LZS Domaszkowice

Youth career
- 2009–2012: RVUFK Kyiv
- 2013: Metalurh Donetsk

Senior career*
Years	Team	Apps	(Gls)
2013–2015	Metalurh Donetsk	0	(0)
2015–2016	FC Dnipro Kirovohrad (amateur)	7	(2)
2016	Inhulets-2 Petrove	9	(0)
2016–2017	Zirka Kropyvnytskyi	1	(0)
2018	UkrAhroKom Holovkivka	7	(0)
2018	Krystal Chortkiv	7	(0)
2019–2022	Tomasovia Tomaszów Lubelski	89	(2)
2022–2023	Znicz Biała Piska	31	(1)
2023–2025	LZS Starowice Dolne	49	(0)
2025–	LZS Domaszkowice	0	(0)

International career
2011	Ukraine U17	4	(0)
- * Club domestic league appearances and goals as of 21:45, 20 June 2025 (UTC)

Oleksandr Zozulya (Ukrainian: Олександр Олегович Зозуля; born 11 April 1996) is a Ukrainian professional footballer who plays as a defender for Polish IV liga Opole club LZS Domaszkowice.

Zozulya is a product of the RVUFK Kyiv and Metalurh Donetsk Youth Sportive School Systems. He spent time in the different Ukrainian Reserves League or amateur clubs, but in summer 2016 signed a contract with Ukrainian Premier League club Zirka Kropyvnytskyi.

He made his league debut for Zirka on 20 November 2016 in a match against Volyn Lutsk.

== Honours ==
Tomasovia Tomaszów Lubelski

- IV liga Lublin: 2020–21

LZS Starowice Dolne

- IV liga Opole: 2024–25
