= List of foreign Ukrainian Premier League players =

This is a list of foreign football players in Ukrainian Vyscha Liha/Premier-Liha.

There is a total of 695 foreign players in Vyscha Liha/Premier-Liha of 60 different nationalities of which 370 have been capped at least once for their national team.

In bold: players who have played at least one Ukrainian Premier League game in the current season (2026–27), and are still at a club for which they have played. This does not include current players of a Ukrainian Premier League club who have not played a Ukrainian Premier League game in the current season.

== Albania ==
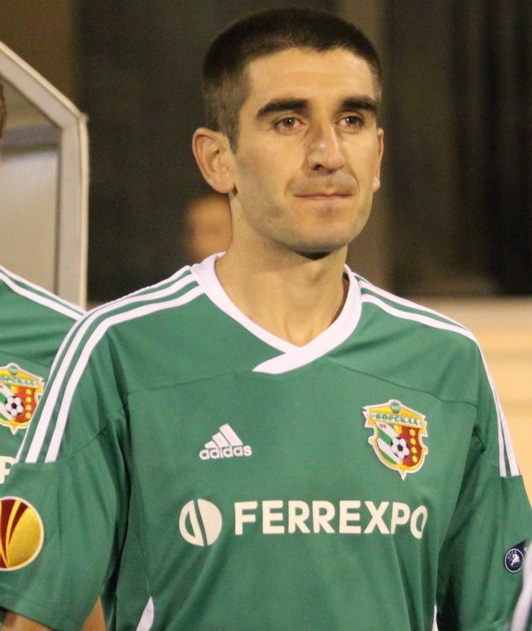
Armend Dallku played 11 seasons in the Ukrainian Premier League and was one of many Albanian players at Vorskla Poltava

- Ansi Agolli – Kryvbas Kryvyi Rih – 2009–10
- Elis Bakaj – Chornomorets Odesa – 2011–14
- Elvin Beqiri – Metalurh Donetsk – 2003–07
- Ervin Bulku – Kryvbas Kryvyi Rih – 2007–10
- Dorian Bylykbashi – Kryvbas Kryvyi Rih – 2006–10
- **Tedi Cara** – Oleksandriya, **LNZ Cherkasy** – 2024–
- Debatik Curri – Vorskla Poltava, Hoverla Uzhhorod, Sevastopol – 2004–10, 2013–14
- **Ajdi Dajko** – **LNZ Cherkasy** – 2024–
- Armend Dallku – Vorskla Poltava – 2005–16
- Andi Hadroj – Polissya Zhytomyr – 2024–26
- Rubin Hebaj – Vorskla Poltava – 2019–20
- Isli Hidi – Kryvbas Kryvyi Rih – 2007–10
- Ahmed Januzi – Vorskla Poltava – 2006–15
- **Irgi Kasalla** – **Kolos Kovalivka** – 2026–
- Uliks Kotrri – Tavriya Simferopol – 2003–04
- Ervis Kraja – Zakarpattia Uzhhorod – 2007–08
- Henri Ndreka – Kryvbas Kryvyi Rih – 2006–08
- Tefik Osmani – Metalurh Zaporizhzhia – 2005–06
- **Ermir Rashica** – **Kharkiv** – 2025–
- **Serjan Repaj** – **Epitsentr Kamianets-Podilskyi** – 2026–
- **Arinaldo Rrapaj** – **Kolos Kovalivka** – 2024–
- Taulant Seferi – Vorskla Poltava – 2022–23
- Bledi Shkëmbi – Metalurh Zaporizhzhia, Kryvbas Kryvyi Rih – 2004–07
- Ardit Toli – Vorskla Poltava – 2022–24
- Kristi Vangjeli – Chornomorets Odesa – 2011–14
- Parid Xhihani – Zorya Luhansk – 2008–11

== Algeria ==
- Adel Gafaiti – Zirka Kropyvnytskyi – 2017–18
- Yanis Hamache – Dnipro-1 – 2022–23

== Argentina ==
- Walter Acevedo – Metalist Kharkiv – 2009–10
- Fabricio Alvarenga – Olimpik Donetsk, Rukh Lviv, Chornomorets Odesa – 2020–24
- Domingo Blanco – Dnipro-1 – 2022–24
- Sebastián Blanco – Metalist Kharkiv
- Gustavo Blanco Leschuk – Karpaty Lviv, Shakhtar Donetsk – 2016–18
- Facundo Bertoglio – Dynamo Kyiv
- Guido Corteggiano – Karpaty Lviv – 2017–18
- Jonatan Cristaldo – Metalist Kharkiv – 2010–14
- Francisco Di Franco – Karpaty Lviv, Dnipro-1 – 2017–22
- Facundo Ferreyra – Shakhtar Donetsk
- Osmar Ferreyra – Dnipro Dnipropetrovsk
- Hernán Fredes – Metalist Kharkiv
- Carlos Frontini – Vorskla Poltava
- Damián Giménez – Chornomorets Odesa
- Alejandro Gómez – Metalist Kharkiv – 2013–14
- Rubén Gómez – Metalurh Donetsk, Stal Alchevsk, Zorya Luhansk, Zakarpattia Uzhhorod, Tavriya Simferopol – 2004–07, 2008–10, 2012–14
- Jonathan Maidana – Metalist Kharkiv
- Roberto Nanni – Dynamo Kyiv – 2004–05
- Cristian Paz – Karpaty Lviv
- Federico Pereyra – Zirka Kropyvnytskyi, Karpaty Lviv – 2016–17
- **Rafael Profini** – **Kharkiv** – 2026–
- **Matías Rosales** – **Kudrivka** – 2026–
- Marco Ruben – Dynamo Kyiv – 2012–13
- José Sosa – Metalist Kharkiv – 2011–14
- Claudio Spinelli – Oleksandriya – 2021–22
- Patricio Tanda – Karpaty Lviv – 2024–26
- Fernando Tissone – Karpaty Lviv – 2017–18
- Marco Torsiglieri – Metalist Kharkiv – 2011–13, 2014–15
- Cristian Villagra – Metalist Kharkiv – 2010–15
- Pablo Vitti – Chornomorets Odesa

== Armenia ==
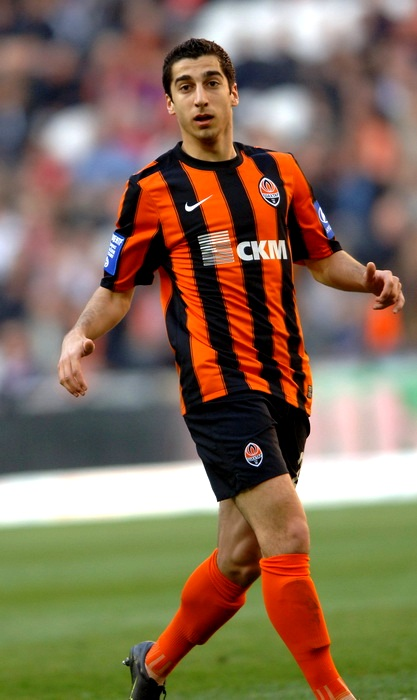
In 2012–13, Henrikh Mkhitaryan won the league with Shakhtar Donetsk, was the top scorer with a record breaking 25 goals, and was chosen Best Player of the season.

- Ararat Arakelyan – Metalurh Donetsk
- Samvel Arakelyan – Metalist Kharkiv
- Artak Dashyan – Metalurh Donetsk – 2009–11
- Hovhannes Demirchyan – Stal Alchevsk
- Gevorg Ghazaryan – Metalurh Donetsk
- Ara Hakobyan – Metalurh Donetsk, Stal Alchevsk, Illichivets Mariupol
- Aram Hakobyan – Illichivets Mariupol
- Arman Hovhannisyan – Zirka Kropyvnytskyi – 2017–18
- Rumyan Hovsepyan – Metalurh Donetsk, Stal Dniprodzerzhynsk
- Gegham Kadimyan – Hoverla Uzhhorod, Olimpik Donetsk, Karpaty Lviv, Zorya Luhansk, Vorskla Poltava, Arsenal Kyiv
- Arman Karamyan – Arsenal Kyiv
- Artavazd Karamyan – Arsenal Kyiv – 2003–04
- Vardan Khachatryan – Metalurh Zaporizhzhia
- Edgar Malakyan – Stal Kamianske – 2015–18
- Yegishe Melikyan – Metalurh Donetsk, Stal Alchevsk, Zorya Luhansk
- Samvel Melkonyan – Metalurh Donetsk
- Henrikh Mkhitaryan – Metalurh Donetsk, Shakhtar Donetsk – 2009–13
- Karlen Mkrtchyan – Metalurh Donetsk
- Marcos Pizzelli – Metalurh Donetsk
- Albert Sarkisyan – Arsenal Kyiv
- Armen Shahgeldyan – Chornomorets Odesa
- Yervand Sukiasyan – Dynamo Kyiv – 1992–93
- Artak Yedigaryan – Metalurh Donetsk
- Tigran Yesayan – Torpedo Zaporizhzhia

== Aruba ==
- Erixon Danso – Stal Kamianske –

== Australia ==
- **Nathanael Blair** – **Veres Rivne** – 2026–

== Austria ==
- Markus Berger – Chornomorets Odesa – 2011–14
- Aleksandar Dragović – Dynamo Kyiv – 2013–17
- **Gabriel Eskinja** – **Zorya Luhansk** – 2024–

== Azerbaijan ==
- Tarlan Ahmadov – Volyn Lutsk – 2003–04
- Rustam Akhmedzade – Mynai – 2020–22
- Samir Aliyev – Volyn Lutsk – 2002–04
- Kamal Guliyev – Volyn Lutsk – 2002–04
- Jahangir Hasanzade – Tavriya Simferopol – 2003–04
- Farrukh Ismayilov – Volyn Lutsk – 2003–04
- Samir Khairov – Zorya Luhansk – 1995–96
- Emil Mustafayev – Oleksandriya, Polissya Zhytomyr, Chornomorets Odesa – 2020–25
- Anatoliy Nuriyev – Stal Kamianske, Mynai, Kolos Kovalivka – 2017–18, 2020–22
- Pavlo Pashayev – Kryvbas Kryvyi Rih, Dnipro Dnipropetrovsk, Karpaty Lviv, Metalurh Zaporizhzhia, Stal Kamianske, Oleksandriya – 2008–11, 2012–21
- Andrey Popovich – Mynai – 2020–21
- Mahmud Qurbanov – Tavriya Simferopol – 2003–04
- Elhan Rasulov – Karpaty Lviv – 1993–98
- Branimir Subašić – Chornomorets Odesa – 2003–04
- Elman Sultanov – Torpedo Zaporizhzhia – 1993–94
- Vadim Vasilyev – Tavriya Simferopol – 2003–04
- Ilham Yadullayev – Volyn Lutsk, Tavriya Simferopol – 2002–04
- Aleksandr Zhidkov – Nyva Vinnytsia – 1992

== Belarus ==
- Syarhey Amelyanchuk – Arsenal Kyiv – 2002–05
- Dzmitry Asipenka – Vorskla Poltava
- Andrey Astrowski – Arsenal Kyiv, Chornomorets Odesa
- Valyantsin Byalkevich – Dynamo Kyiv – 1996–2007
- Yawhen Branavitski – Vorskla Poltava
- Pavel Byahanski – Illichivets Mariupol
- Artsyom Chelyadzinski – Metalurh Zaporizhzhia
- Alyaksandr Danilaw – Metalist Kharkiv, Metalurh Donetsk, Arsenal Kyiv – 2004–11
- Uladzimir Haew – Chornomorets Odesa
- Barys Haravoy – Metalurh Zaporizhzhia
- Ihar Hurynovich – Veres Rivne
- Syarhey Kabelski – Metalurh Zaporizhzhia
- Tsimafey Kalachow – Shakhtar Donetsk, Illichivets Mariupol
- Heorhiy Kandratsyew – Temp Shepetivka
- Syarhey Karnilenka – Dynamo Kyiv, Dnipro Dnipropetrovsk
- Maksim Karpovich – Vorskla Poltava
- Uladzimir Karytska – Metalurh Zaporizhzhia, Chornomorets Odesa, Metalurh Donetsk
- Mikalay Kashewski – Metalurh Zaporizhzhia, Kryvbas Kryvyi Rih, Illichivets Mariupol, Tavriya Simferopol – 2003–11
- Alyaksandr Khatskevich – Dynamo Kyiv – 1996–2003
- Vasil Khamutowski – Metalist Kharkiv, Tavriya Simferopol
- Pavel Kirylchyk – Kryvbas Kryvyi Rih, Chornomorets Odesa, Karpaty Lviv, Illichivets Mariupol
- Mihail Konopelko – Tavriya Simferopol
- Nikita Korzun – Dynamo Kyiv – 2016–17
- Konstantin Kovalenko – Kremin Kremenchuk
- Leanid Kovel – Karpaty Lviv
- Dzyanis Kowba – Zirka Kirovohrad
- Syarhey Kukalevich – Tavriya Simferopol
- Syarhey Kuznyatsow – Metalist Kharkiv, Tavriya Simferopol, Arsenal Kyiv – 2004–09
- Vital Lanko – Volyn Lutsk
- Yawhen Lashankow – Chornomorets Odesa, Kharkiv
- Artur Lesko – Kryvbas Kryvyi Rih
- Yawhen Linyow – Metalurh Zaporizhzhia, Tavriya Simferopol
- Mihail Makowski – Dynamo Kyiv, Vorskla Poltava, CSKA Kyiv, Zakarpattia Uzhhorod
- Uladzimir Makowski – Dynamo Kyiv, Vorskla Poltava, CSKA Kyiv, Zakarpattia Uzhhorod
- Henadz Mardas – Tavriya Simferopol
- Yuri Markhel – Metalurh Zaporizhzhia
- Artur Matsveychyk – Kryvbas Kryvyi Rih
- Alyaksey Pankavets – Kharkiv
- Aleksandr Pavlovets – Kolos Kovalivka – 2021–22
- Pavel Radnyonak – Veres Rivne
- Gleb Rassadkin – Zirka Kropyvnytskyi – 2017–18
- Ihar Razhkow – Kryvbas Kryvyi Rih
- Alyaksandr Shahoyka – Kryvbas Kryvyi Rih
- Ilya Shkurin – Dynamo Kyiv – 2021–22
- Syarhey Shtanyuk – Metalurh Zaporizhzhia
- Mikhail Sivakow – Chornomorets Odesa, Zorya Luhansk – 2014–17
- Alyaksey Suchkow – Karpaty Lviv, Kharkiv
- Yan Tsiharow – Metalurh Zaporizhzhia
- Andrey Varankaw – Obolon Kyiv, Kryvbas Kryvyi Rih
- Syarhey Vyeramko – Kharkiv, Sevastopol
- Syarhey Yaskovich – Shakhtar Donetsk
- Alyaksandr Yurevich – Karpaty Lviv
- Nikolay Zolotov – Kolos Kovalivka – 2021–23

== Belgium ==
- Ziguy Badibanga – Chornomorets Odesa – 2022–24
- Ibrahim Kargbo Jr. – Dynamo Kyiv, Olimpik Donetsk – 2019–21

== Bolivia ==
- Diego Arroyo – Shakhtar Donetsk – 2024–26
- Vicente Arze – Hoverla Uzhhorod – 2013–14
- **Santiago Cuiza** – **Kryvbas Kryvyi Rih** – 2026–
- José Flores – Kryvbas Kryvyi Rih – 2025–26
- Marcelo Martins Moreno – Shakhtar Donetsk – 2008–09, 2010–11
- Gustavo Pinedo – Chornomorets Odesa – 2009–10
- Mauricio Saucedo – Chornomorets Odesa – 2009–10
- Rodrigo Vargas – Karpaty Lviv – 2017–19

== Bosnia and Herzegovina ==
- Vladimir Arsić – Chornomorets Odesa – 2024–25
- Spomenko Bošnjak – Metalurh Zaporizhzhia – 2002–06
- Admir Bristrić – Polissya Zhytomyr – 2024–25
- Đorđe Inđić – Chornomorets Odesa – 2003–04
- **Andrija Janjić** – **Zorya Luhansk** – 2025–
- Igor Joksimović – Zakarpattia Uzhhorod
- Rifet Kapić – Kryvbas Kryvyi Rih – 2022–23
- Branislav Krunić – Volyn Lutsk – 2004–05
- Edin Kunić – Karpaty Lviv
- Amar Kvakić – Metalist 1925 Kharkiv – 2021–22
- Adi Mehremić – Karpaty Lviv – 2018–19
- Todor Petrović – Vorskla Poltava – 2018–20
- **Dejan Popara** – **Zorya Luhansk** – 2024–
- Sead Ramović – Metalurh Zaporizhzhia – 2011
- Zdravko Šaraba – Volyn Lutsk
- Edin Šehić – Vorskla Poltava – 2018–20
- Semir Štilić – Karpaty Lviv – 2012–13
- Toni Šunjić – Zorya Luhansk – 2011–14
- Sergej Tica – Stal Alchevsk
- Nikola Vasilj – Zorya Luhansk – 2019–21

== Brazil ==
- Aílton – Metalurh Donetsk
- Alan – Stal Alchevsk, Metalurh Donetsk, Arsenal Kyiv – 2007–08
- Alan Patrick – Shakhtar Donetsk – 2011–13, 2016–22
- Alcides – Dnipro Dnipropetrovsk – 2008–10
- Alessandro – Dynamo Kyiv
- Alex da Silva – Metalurh Donetsk – 2013–15
- **Alisson** – **Shakhtar Donetsk** – 2024–
- Leandro Almeida – Dynamo Kyiv
- Anderson Ribeiro – Metalist Kharkiv, Kharkiv, Metalurh Zaporizhzhia – 2004–09, 2010
- André – Dynamo Kyiv – 2010
- **Andrey** – **Veres Rivne** – 2026–
- Léo Antônio – Lviv – 2022–23
- Danilo Avelar – Karpaty Lviv
- Márcio Azevedo – Metalist Kharkiv, Shakhtar Donetsk – 2013–15, 2017
- Gil Bala – Stal Alchevsk, Arsenal Kyiv
- João Batista – Shakhtar Donetsk
- William Batista – Karpaty Lviv, Kharkiv
- Bernard – Shakhtar Donetsk – 2013–18
- Betão – Dynamo Kyiv – 2008–12
- Matheus Bianchim – Metalurh Zaporizhzhia
- Bill – Dnipro-1 – 2020–22, 2023–24
- William Boaventura – Metalurh Donetsk
- Brandão – Shakhtar Donetsk – 2002–08
- Bruninho – Zirka Kropyvnytskyi – 2017–18
- Bruninho – Karpaty Lviv – 2024–26
- Vitor Bueno – Dynamo Kyiv – 2018
- Diego Carioca – Kolos Kovalivka – 2021–22, 2023–25
- Cauã Paixão – Polissya Zhytomyr – 2024–25
- Alessandro Celin – Volyn Lutsk – 2013–14
- Júlio César – Metalurh Donetsk
- China – Karpaty Lviv, Lviv – 2017, 2019–21
- Clayton – Dynamo Kyiv – 2020–21
- Cleyton – Metalurh Donetsk
- André Conceição – Metalist Kharkiv – 2005
- Corrêa – Dynamo Kyiv
- Rogério Corrêa – Illichivets Mariupol
- Douglas Costa – Shakhtar Donetsk – 2010–15
- Leo Costa – Volyn Lutsk
- Talles Costa – Polissya Zhytomyr – 2023–26
- Cristian – Zorya Luhansk – 2021–23
- Davidson – Dnipro Dnipropetrovsk
- Dentinho – Shakhtar Donetsk – 2011–12, 2014–21
- Flávio Dias – Zorya Luhansk
- **Diego Andradina** – **Livyi Bereh Kyiv** – 2024–25, 2026–
- Diego Souza – Metalist Kharkiv – 2013–14
- Dodô – Shakhtar Donetsk – 2018, 2019–22
- Douglas – Dnipro Dnipropetrovsk, Dnipro-1 – 2013–15, 2020–21
- Fábio Duarte – Metalurh Zaporizhzhia
- Dudu – Dynamo Kyiv – 2011–13
- Edmar – Tavriya Simferopol, Metalist Kharkiv – 2003–11
- Edson Fernando – Rukh Lviv, Karpaty Lviv – 2022–26
- Eguinaldo – Shakhtar Donetsk – 2023–26
- Elano – Shakhtar Donetsk – 2005–07
- **Elias Telles** – **Kolos Kovalivka** – 2024–
- Jorge Elias – Chornomorets Odesa – 2017
- Émerson – Dnipro Dnipropetrovsk – 1996
- **Eriki** – **Karpaty Lviv** – 2025–
- Everton – Tavriya Simferopol
- Fabinho – Olimpik Donetsk, Metalist 1925 Kharkiv – 2019–20, 2021–22
- Fabinho – Metalurh Donetsk
- **Fabrício Yan** – **Veres Rivne** – 2025–
- **Fellipe Vieira** – **Karpaty Lviv** – 2026–
- Fernandinho – Shakhtar Donetsk – 2005–13
- Fernando – Shakhtar Donetsk – 2018–22
- Fininho – Metalist Kharkiv – 2009–13
- Rafael Forster – Zorya Luhansk – 2015–18
- Geovani – Oleksandriya – 2023–25
- Giuliano – Dnipro Dnipropetrovsk
- Junior Godoi – Tavriya Simferopol, Zorya Luhansk, Metalurh Zaporizhzhia
- Caio Gomes – Chornomorets Odesa – 2024–25
- Vagner Gonçalves – Dnipro-1 – 2020–21
- Marcinho Guerreiro – Metalurh Donetsk – 2007
- Guilherme – Dynamo Kyiv
- Guilherme – Lviv – 2022–23
- **Guilherme Bahia** – **Veres Rivne** – 2025–
- Guttiner – Olimpik Donetsk, Chornomorets Odesa – 2017–18
- Higor Gabriel – Lviv – 2022–23
- Iago Siqueira – Veres Rivne – 2023–25
- Igor Neves – Karpaty Lviv, Rukh Lviv – 2024–26
- Ilsinho – Shakhtar Donetsk
- **Isaque Silva** – **Shakhtar Donetsk** – 2025–
- Ismaily – Shakhtar Donetsk – 2012–22
- **Ítalo Henrique** – **Zorya Luhansk** – 2026–
- Ivan – Shakhtar Donetsk
- Jader – Metalist Kharkiv – 2005–06
- Jádson – Shakhtar Donetsk – 2005–11
- Jajá – Metalist Kharkiv – 2008–10, 2013, 2014
- João Vialle – Polissya Zhytomyr – 2024–26
- **Jordan** – **Zorya Luhansk** – 2023–
- Juan Alvina – Oleksandriya – 2023–26
- **Juninho** – **Zorya Luhansk** – 2020–22, 2023–
- **Kauã Elias** – **Shakhtar Donetsk** – 2024–
- Kevin – Shakhtar Donetsk – 2023–25
- Klayver – Rukh Lviv – 2023–26
- Kléber – Dynamo Kyiv – 2004–07
- Leândro – Zakarpattia Uzhhorod, Tavriya Simferopol
- Leandro – Metalurh Donetsk
- Leonardo – Shakhtar Donetsk
- Leonardo – Metalurh Donetsk – 2013
- Leonidas – Zorya Luhansk
- Lima – Illichivets Mariupol
- Fabiano Lima – Metalurh Zaporizhzhia
- Ramon Lopes – Volyn Lutsk
- Luan Campos – Veres Rivne – 2024–25
- **Luca Meirelles** – **Shakhtar Donetsk** – 2025–
- **Lucas Ferreira** – **Shakhtar Donetsk** – 2025–
- Lucas Taylor – Lviv, Dnipro-1, Shakhtar Donetsk, Polissya Zhytomyr – 2018–21, 2022–25
- Luiz Adriano – Shakhtar Donetsk – 2007–15
- Luizão – Vorskla Poltava – 2019–20, 2021
- Leandro Machado – Dynamo Kyiv
- Gérson Magrão – Dynamo Kyiv
- Maicon – Volyn Lutsk, Shakhtar Donetsk, Zorya Luhansk, Illichivets Mariupol – 2010, 2011–13
- Marcelo – Metalist Kharkiv – 2005
- Marcos Antônio – Shakhtar Donetsk – 2018–22
- Marlon – Shakhtar Donetsk – 2021–22, 2025–26
- **Marlon Gomes** – **Shakhtar Donetsk** – 2023–
- Marlos – Metalist Kharkiv, Shakhtar Donetsk – 2012–17
- Marlyson – Metalist 1925 Kharkiv, Vorskla Poltava – 2021–23
- Marquinhos Cipriano – Shakhtar Donetsk – 2018–21
- Matheus – Metalurh Zaporizhzhia
- Matheus – Dnipro Dnipropetrovsk – 2011–16
- Léo Matos – Chornomorets Odesa
- Matteo Amoroso – Kryvbas Kryvyi Rih – 2024–25
- Matuzalém – Shakhtar Donetsk – 2004–07
- Maycon – Shakhtar Donetsk – 2018–22
- Mateus Mendes – Chornomorets Odesa – 2016
- Michael – Dynamo Kyiv
- Júnior Moraes – Metalurh Donetsk, Dynamo Kyiv, Shakhtar Donetsk – 2012–16, 2017–19
- Nailson – Zirka Kropyvnytskyi – 2017
- Hadson Nery – Tavriya Simferopol
- João Neto – Chornomorets Odesa – 2024–25
- **Newerton** – **Shakhtar Donetsk** – 2023–
- Renan Oliveira – Lviv, Kolos Kovalivka – 2019–22
- Roger de Oliveira – Tavriya Simferopol
- Sérgio Oliveira – Metalurh Donetsk
- Filipe Pachtmann – Lviv – 2019–20
- Marcos Paulo – Metalist Kharkiv
- Paulo Vítor – Karpaty Lviv – 2025–26
- **Pedrinho** – **Shakhtar Donetsk** – 2021–22, 2024–
- **Pedro Henrique** – **Shakhtar Donetsk** – 2023–
- **Jean Pedroso** – **Karpaty Lviv** – 2024–
- Eric Pereira – Karpaty Lviv
- Fábio Pereira – Vorskla Poltava
- Pernambuco – Lviv – 2019
- Anderson Pico – Dnipro Dnipropetrovsk
- Rafael Ratão – Zorya Luhansk – 2018–19
- Lucas Rangel – Vorskla Poltava, Kolos Kovalivka – 2021–22, 2023–24
- Wesley Ribeiro – Kryvbas Kryvyi Rih
- Diogo Rincón – Dynamo Kyiv – 2002–07
- Rodolfo – Dynamo Kyiv – 2004–06
- Rodrigo – Dynamo Kyiv
- Ryan – Chornomorets Odesa – 2024–25
- Sidcley – Dynamo Kyiv – 2018–19, 2020–22
- **Sidnney** – **Livyi Bereh Kyiv** – 2024–25, 2026–
- Silas – Zorya Luhansk
- Danilo Silva – Dynamo Kyiv – 2010–16
- Sílvio – Chornomorets Odesa – 2016–18
- Zé Soares – Metalurh Donetsk
- Murilo Souza – Lviv – 2022–23
- Adriano Spadoto – Zorya Luhansk
- Stênio – Karpaty Lviv – 2024–25
- Taison – Metalist Kharkiv, Shakhtar Donetsk – 2010–21
- **Talles Brener** – Olimpik Donetsk, Rukh Lviv, **LNZ Cherkasy** – 2020–24, 2025–
- Tchê Tchê – Dynamo Kyiv – 2018–19
- Alex Teixeira – Shakhtar Donetsk – 2010–15
- Tetê – Shakhtar Donetsk – 2018–22
- Thiago – Karpaty Lviv
- **Thiago Borges** – **Kryvbas Kryvyi Rih** – 2025–
- Rodrigo Toledo – Metalurh Zaporizhzhia
- Léo Veloso – Chornomorets Odesa
- Álvaro Vieira – Lviv – 2018–22
- **Vinicius Tobias** – **Shakhtar Donetsk** – 2024–
- Vitão – Shakhtar Donetsk – 2019–22
- Vitinho – Dynamo Kyiv – 2021–22
- Paulo Vogt – Metalurh Donetsk, Stal Alchevsk – 2006–07
- Washington – Metalurh Zaporizhzhia
- Welves – Lviv – 2019–20
- Wendell – Polissya Zhytomyr, Veres Rivne – 2024–25
- **Wendell** – **Livyi Bereh Kyiv** – 2026–
- **Wesley Pomba** – **Veres Rivne** – 2025–
- Willian – Shakhtar Donetsk – 2007–12
- Cleiton Xavier – Metalist Kharkiv – 2010–15

== Bulgaria ==
- Ibriam Dail – Vorskla Poltava – 1997–98
- Velizar Dimitrov – Metalurh Donetsk – 2008–14
- Viktor Genev – Oleksandriya – 2011–12
- Ventsislav Hristov – Metalurh Donetsk – 2013–14
- Valentin Iliev – Metalurh Zaporizhzhia, Volyn Lutsk – 2001–04, 2012–13
- Velin Kefalov – Vorskla Poltava – 1996–98
- Vasil Kolev – Nyva Ternopil – 2000–01
- Dimitar Makriev – Oleksandriya – 2011–12
- Aleksandar Mladenov – Sevastopol – 2010–11
- Yuliyan Neychev – Nyva Ternopil – 2000–01
- Predrag Pažin – Shakhtar Donetsk – 2002–04
- Georgi Peev – Dynamo Kyiv, Dnipro Dnipropetrovsk – 2000–06
- Yordan Petkov – Vorskla Poltava – 1997–2000
- Stanimir Stalev – Nyva Ternopil – 2000–01
- Svetoslav Todorov – Hoverla Uzhhorod – 2012–13
- Aleksandar Tomash – Metalurh Zaporizhzhia – 2005–06
- Chavdar Yankov – Metalurh Donetsk – 2009–12
- Petar Zanev – Volyn Lutsk – 2012–13

== Burkina Faso ==
- Aristide Bancé – Metalurh Donetsk –
- Dramane Salou – Olimpik Donetsk – 2019–20
- **Lassina Traoré** – **Shakhtar Donetsk** – 2021–
- Oula Abass Traoré – Lviv – 2022–23

== Cameroon ==
- Alain Amougou – Metalist Kharkiv – 2002
- Jules Baga – Zorya Luhansk
- Mollo Bessala – LNZ Cherkasy – 2023–25
- Joyskim Dawa – Mariupol – 2017–20
- Yvan Dibango – Kryvbas Kryvyi Rih – 2022–26
- Paul Essola – Stal Alchevsk, Arsenal Kyiv, Dnipro Dnipropetrovsk – 2007–10
- Ngassam Nana Falemi – Volyn Lutsk
- Patrick Ibanda – Vorskla Poltava, Arsenal Kyiv, Zorya Luhansk, Kryvbas Kryvyi Rih
- Eric Kamdem Kamdem – Illichivets Mariupol
- Éric Matoukou – Arsenal Kyiv, Volyn Lutsk – 2012–13
- Moses Esingila Molongo – Volyn Lutsk, Vorskla Poltava
- Alvaro Ngamba – Kolos Kovalivka – 2020–22
- Colince Ngaha Poungoue – Zorya Luhansk
- Samuel Nongoh – Veres Rivne – 2024–26
- Ernest Siankam – Volyn Lutsk
- Adolphe Teikeu – Metalurh Zaporizhzhia
- Bernard Tchoutang – Metalurh Donetsk – 2002–03

== Canada ==
- Milan Božić – Volyn Lutsk – 2005
- Manjrekar James – Chornomorets Odesa – 2022–23

== Cape Verde ==
- Fábio Silva – Metalurh Zaporizhzhia – 2010–11
- Eynel Soares – LNZ Cherkasy – 2023–26
- **Leandro Andrade** – **Polissya Zhytomyr** – 2026–

== Colombia ==
- Leonardo Acevedo – Zorya Luhansk
- **Nicolás Arévalo** – **Kharkiv** – 2025–
- Yhonatan Bedoya – Karpaty Lviv – 2017–18
- Brayan Ceballos – Dynamo Kyiv – 2024–25
- Maurício Cortés – Karpaty Lviv
- Nelson Rivas – Dnipro Dnipropetrovsk
- Ángel Torres – Dynamo Kyiv – 2025–26

== Congo (Republic of the Congo) ==
- Rudy Ndey – Zorya Luhansk – 2006
- Patrick Iwosso – Zorya Luhansk – 2006
- Kevin Koubemba – Chornomorets Odesa – 2022-23
- **Kaya Makosso** – **Kudrivka** – 2025–
- Béni Makouana – Polissya Zhytomyr, LNZ Cherkasy – 2023–25
- Burnel Okana-Stazi – Stal Alchevsk – 2005–07
- **Borel Tomandzoto** – **Polissya Zhytomyr** – 2024–
- **Jerry Yoka** – Polissya Zhytomyr, **Chornomorets Odesa** – 2024–25, 2026–

== Costa Rica ==
- Jewison Bennette – LNZ Cherkasy – 2024–27
- Ronald Matarrita – Dnipro-1 – 2023–24
- Jonathan Moya – Zirka Kropyvnytskyi – 2016
- John Jairo Ruiz – Dnipro Dnipropetrovsk – 2015–16

== Croatia ==
- Valter Androšić – Vorskla Poltava
- Mladen Bartulović – Dnipro Dnipropetrovsk, Kryvbas Kryvyi Rih, Arsenal Kyiv, Karpaty Lviv, Vorskla Poltava, Inhulets Petrove – 2006–16, 2020–22
- **Jakov Bašić** – **Zorya Luhansk** – 2023–
- Ante Bekavac – Kryvbas Kryvyi Rih – 2025–27
- Petar Bosančić – Mariupol – 2021–22
- Goran Brajković – Arsenal Kyiv
- Dario Brgles – Arsenal Kyiv
- Frane Čirjak – Lviv – 2020–22
- Mario Ćuže – Dnipro-1 – 2021–22
- Lovro Cvek – Zorya Luhansk – 2020–22
- Mario Dodić – Metalurh Zaporizhzhia
- Neven Đurasek – Dnipro-1, Shakhtar Donetsk – 2021–22, 2022–23
- Saša Đuričić – Vorskla Poltava, Tavriya Simferopol – 2005–11
- Eduardo – Shakhtar Donetsk
- Bartol Franjić – Shakhtar Donetsk – 2024–25
- Denis Glavina – Vorskla Poltava, Dnipro Dnipropetrovsk
- Ivan Graf – Tavriya Simferopol – 2011
- Hrvoje Ilić – Kryvbas Kryvyi Rih – 2023–26
- **Domagoj Jelavić** – **Zorya Luhansk** – 2025–
- Igor Jovićević – Karpaty Lviv – 2003
- Jan Jurčec – Kryvbas Kryvyi Rih – 2024–27
- Nikola Kalinić – Dnipro Dnipropetrovsk – 2011–15
- **Mihael Klepač** – **Bukovyna Chernivtsi** – 2026–
- Jerko Leko – Dynamo Kyiv
- Marin Ljubičić – Tavriya Simferopol
- Dragan Lovrić – Kryvbas Kryvyi Rih – 2022–23
- Matej Matić – Polissya Zhytomyr – 2024–25
- Mislav Matić – Mynai – 2020–22
- Jerko Mikulić – Karpaty Lviv
- Ivan Pešić – Vorskla Poltava – 2020, 2021–22
- Ivica Pirić – Arsenal Kyiv
- Josip Pivarić – Dynamo Kyiv – 2017–18, 2020
- Stipe Pletikosa – Shakhtar Donetsk
- David Puclin – Vorskla Poltava – 2020–22
- Jurica Puljiz – Zorya Luhansk
- Goran Sablić – Dynamo Kyiv
- Krševan Santini – Zorya Luhansk – 2012–16
- Mirko Selak – Metalurh Zaporizhzhia
- Ronald Šiklić – Kryvbas Kryvyi Rih
- Matija Špičić – Tavriya Simferopol
- Darijo Srna – Shakhtar Donetsk – 2003–17
- Ivan Strinić – Dnipro Dnipropetrovsk – 2011–14
- Ivijan Svržnjak – Lviv – 2022–23
- Domagoj Vida – Dynamo Kyiv – 2013–17
- Tomislav Višević – Metalurh Zaporizhzhia
- Ognjen Vukojević – Dynamo Kyiv
- Ivica Žuljević – Metalurh Donetsk
- Ivica Žunić – Volyn Lutsk, Chornomorets Odesa – 2014–16, 2017–18

== Curaçao ==
- Sendley Bito – Stal Alchevsk, Arsenal Kyiv, Zakarpattia Uzhhorod, Tavriya Simferopol – 2006–08, 2009–10 ( (Netherlands Antilles) while active)

== Cyprus ==
- Constantinos Makrides – Metalurh Donetsk

== Czech Republic ==
- Mario Holek – Dnipro Dnipropetrovsk – 2007–12
- Tomáš Hübschman – Shakhtar Donetsk – 2004–14
- Jiří Jeslínek – Kryvbas Kryvyi Rih – 2010–13
- Luboš Kalouda – Oleksandriya – 2011–12
- Jan Králík – Oleksandriya – 2011–12
- Jan Laštůvka – Shakhtar Donetsk, Dnipro Dnipropetrovsk – 2004–07, 2009–16
- Ondřej Mazuch – Dnipro Dnipropetrovsk – 2011–15

== Denmark ==
- Mikkel Duelund – Dynamo Kyiv – 2018–21

== DR Congo (Democratic Republic of the Congo) ==
- Nzelo Hervé Lembi – Metalurh Donetsk – 2006–07
- Dieumerci Mbokani – Dynamo Kyiv – 2013–15, 2017–18
- Mafoumba Mfilu – CSKA Kyiv – 1995
- Aurélien Ngeyitala – Arsenal Kyiv – 2018
- Jordan N'Kololo – Volyn Lutsk – 2021

== Ecuador ==
- Denil Castillo – Shakhtar Donetsk – 2023–24
- Jair Collahuazo – Kudrivka – 2025–26
- José Hernández – Oleksandriya – 2023–24
- Peter Mercado – Vorskla Poltava
- Narciso Mina – Chornomorets Odesa

== England ==
- Rodel Richards – Vorskla Poltava – 2022–23
- Viv Solomon-Otabor – Rukh Lviv – 2022–24

== Eritrea ==
- Hennos Asmelash – Inhulets Petrove – 2020–22

== Estonia ==
- Mihkel Ainsalu – Lviv – 2020
- Tarmo Kink – Karpaty Lviv – 2012
- Stanislav Kitto – Zorya Luhansk – 1996
- Aleksandr Marašov – Zorya Luhansk – 1996
- Jevgeni Novikov – Zirka Kirovohrad – 2004
- Taavi Rähn – Volyn Lutsk – 2004–06
- Joonas Tamm – Desna Chernihiv, Vorskla Poltava – 2020–22
- Sergei Zenjov – Karpaty Lviv – 2008–14

== Finland ==
- Alexei Eremenko – Metalist Kharkiv – 2009–10
- Roman Eremenko – Dynamo Kyiv – 2008–12
- Veli Lampi – Arsenal Kyiv
- Abukar Mohamed – Karpaty Lviv

== France ==
- Joël Bopesu – Lviv – 2019–20
- Serigne Diop – Stal Alchevsk – 2006–07
- Issiar Dramé – Olimpik Donetsk – 2020–21
- David Faupala – Zorya Luhansk – 2017–18
- Arnaud Guedj – Zirka Kropyvnytskyi – 2017–18
- Damien Le Tallec – Hoverla Uzhhorod – 2012–14
- **Pierre Mounguengue** – **Dynamo Kyiv** – 2026–
- Alassane N'Diaye – Chornomorets Odesa – 2017–18
- Pape-Alioune Ndiaye – Vorskla Poltava – 2019–21
- Théo Ndicka – Oleksandriya – 2024–26
- Noha Ndombasi – Kryvbas Kryvyi Rih – 2024–26
- Cécé Pepe – Zirka Kropyvnytskyi – 2017–18
- Julian Rullier – Zirka Kropyvnytskyi – 2017–18
- **Joseph Séry** – **Karpaty Lviv** – 2026–
- Sambou Sissoko – Vorskla Poltava – 2023–24
- Maxime Teixeira – Olimpik Donetsk – 2018–21
- Benoît Trémoulinas – Dynamo Kyiv – 2013, 2014
- Mamadou Wagué – Chornomorets Odesa – 2017–18
- Curtis Yebli – Arsenal Kyiv – 2018–19
- Karim Yoda – Karpaty Lviv – 2018–19

== Gabon ==
- Gaëtan Missi Mezu – Arsenal Kyiv – 2018–19

== Gambia (The Gambia) ==
- Baboucarr Faal – Rukh Lviv, Karpaty Lviv – 2024–26
- **Moses Jarju** – **Chornomorets Odesa** – 2024–25, 2026–
- **Alagie Wally** – **Veres Rivne** – 2025–

== Georgia (Georgia (country)) ==
- Kakhaber Aladashvili – Temp Shepetivka
- Kakhaber Aladashvili – Dynamo Kyiv, Dnipro Dnipropetrovsk, Zakarpattia Uzhhorod, Kharkiv
- Aleksandr Amisulashvili – Tavriya Simferopol
- Shalva Apkhazava – Arsenal Kyiv
- Malkhaz Asatiani – Dynamo Kyiv
- **Irakli Azarovi** – **Shakhtar Donetsk** – 2023–
- Giorgi Babuadze – Temp Shepetivka
- Revazi Barabadze – Dnipro Dnipropetrovsk
- Niazi Brunjadze – Temp Shepetivka, Mykolaiv
- Vladimir Burduli – Kryvbas Kryvyi Rih, Zorya Luhansk, Tavriya Simferopol, Zakarpattia Uzhhorod
- David Chaladze – Temp Shepetivka
- Grigol Chanturia – Tavriya Simferopol, Zakarpattia Uzhhorod
- Vakhtang Chanturishvili – Oleksandriya
- Giorgi Chelidze – Zorya Luhansk
- Lasha Chelidze – Metalurh Zaporizhzhia
- Giorgi Chikhradze – Temp Shepetivka, Shakhtar Donetsk
- Kakhaber Chkhetiani – Tavriya Simferopol
- Zviadi Chkhetiani – Tavriya Simferopol
- Shota Chomakhidze – Nyva Ternopil, Tavriya Simferopol
- Vitaly Daraselia – CSKA Kyiv
- Giorgi Davitnidze – Nyva Ternopil
- Giorgi Demetradze – Dynamo Kyiv, Metalurh Donetsk, Arsenal Kyiv – 2000, 2003–05, 2006–08
- Kakhaber Dgebuadze – Nyva Ternopil
- Temur Dimitrishvili – Zorya Luhansk
- Giorgi Gabedava – Illichivets Mariupol
- Iuri Gabiskiria – Temp Shepetivka, Shakhtar Donetsk, Kryvbas Kryvyi Rih
- Teymuraz Gadelia – Veres Rivne
- Giorgi Gadrani – Desna Chernihiv, Chornomorets Odesa
- **Nika Gagnidze** – **Kolos Kovalivka** – 2024–
- Paata Gamtsemlidze – Temp Shepetivka
- Giorgi Gakhokidze – Metalurh Donetsk
- Mate Ghvinianidze – Sevastopol
- Vasil Gigiadze – Tavriya Simferopol, Kryvbas Kryvyi Rih, Naftovyk-Ukrnafta Okhtyrka – 2000–03, 2004–11
- Giorgi Gocholeishvili – Shakhtar Donetsk – 2022–24
- Beka Gotsiridze – Dnipro Dnipropetrovsk
- Revaz Gotsiridze – Kryvbas Kryvyi Rih
- Alexander Guruli – Karpaty Lviv
- Gia Gvazava – Temp Shepetivka
- Avtandil Gvianidze – Nyva Ternopil
- Grigol Imedadze – Tavriya Simferopol – 2004
- Davit Imedashvili – Dynamo Kyiv
- Zurab Ionanidze – Tavriya Simferopol
- Lasha Jakobia – Metalist Kharkiv, Arsenal Kyiv – 2004–07, 2009
- Gocha Jamarauli – Metalurh Donetsk
- Mikheil Jishkariani – Dynamo Kyiv
- Mamuka Jugeli – Temp Shepetivka, Zorya Luhansk, Tavriya Simferopol, Prykarpattya Ivano-Frankivsk, Mykolaiv
- Aleksandr Kaidarashvili – Nyva Ternopil, Kryvbas Kryvyi Rih
- Kakha Kaladze – Dynamo Kyiv – 1998–2000
- Ilia Kandelaki – Chornomorets Odesa
- Jaba Kankava – Arsenal Kyiv, Dnipro Dnipropetrovsk, Kryvbas Kryvyi Rih
- Avtandil Kapanadze – Temp Shepetivka, Nyva Ternopil
- Tariel Kapanadze – Temp Shepetivka, Nyva Ternopil
- Davit Khocholava – Chornomorets Odesa, Shakhtar Donetsk – 2015–21
- Shalva Khujadze – Nyva Ternopil
- Vakhtang Khvadagiani – Veres Rivne – 1994–95
- Giorgi Kilasonia – Dnipro Dnipropetrovsk
- Varlam Kilasonia – Dnipro Dnipropetrovsk
- Aleksandre Kobakhidze – Dnipro Dnipropetrovsk, Kryvbas Kryvyi Rih, Arsenal Kyiv
- Luka Koberidze – Desna Chernihiv
- Anzor Kovteladze – Vorskla Poltava
- Giorgi Kutsia – Veres Rivne – 2024–26
- Dato Kvirkvelia – Metalurh Zaporizhzhia
- Solomon Kvirkvelia – Metalist 1925 Kharkiv – 2021–22
- Gela Kvitatiani – Zorya Luhansk
- Luka Latsabidze – Chornomorets Odesa – 2024–25
- Jaba Lipartia – Zorya Luhansk, Arsenal Kyiv – 2010–17, 2018–19
- Ucha Lobjanidze – Dnipro Dnipropetrovsk
- Giorgi Lomaia – Karpaty Lviv
- **Giorgi Maisuradze** – **Polissya Zhytomyr** – 2024–
- Temur Margoshia – Mykolaiv
- Otar Martsvaladze – Dynamo Kyiv, Zakarpattia Uzhhorod
- Konstantin Metreveli – Nyva Ternopil
- Levan Mikadze – CSKA Kyiv, Arsenal Kyiv, Kryvbas Kryvyi Rih
- Irakli Modebadze – Metalurh Zaporizhzhia, Chornomorets Odesa
- Kakhaber Mzhavanadze – Chornomorets Odesa
- Shota Nonikashvili – LNZ Cherkasy – 2024–26
- Tornike Okriashvili – Illichivets Mariupol
- Sergi Orbeladze – Illichivets Mariupol
- Tamaz Pertia – Temp Shepetivka
- Zurab Popkhadze – Kryvbas Kryvyi Rih
- Mikhail Potskhveria – Zorya Luhansk, Metalurh Zaporizhzhia, Shakhtar Donetsk, Dnipro Dnipropetrovsk
- Alexander Rekhviashvili – Temp Shepetivka
- **Giorgi Robakidze** – **Chornomorets Odesa** – 2024–25, 2026–
- **Zurab Rukhadze** – **Kolos Kovalivka** – 2025–
- Mamuka Rusia – Temp Shepetivka
- Giorgi Shashiashvili – Chornomorets Odesa
- Gela Shekiladze – Arsenal Kyiv
- Irakli Shengelia – Nyva Ternopil
- Nika Sichinava – Inhulets Petrove, Kolos Kovalivka – 2020–22
- Avtandil Sikharulidze – Nyva Ternopil
- Merab Tevzadze – Temp Shepetivka
- Gocha Trapaidze – Tavriya Simferopol
- Georgi Tsimakuridze – Stal Alchevsk, Illichivets Mariupol, Zorya Luhansk
- Giorgi Tsitaishvili – Dynamo Kyiv, Vorskla Poltava, Chornomorets Odesa – 2018–22
- Levan Tskitishvili – Metalurh Donetsk – 2005
- Tengiz Ugrekhelidze – Nyva Ternopil
- Gocha Zhorzholiani – Temp Shepetivka

== Germany ==
- David Odonkor – Hoverla Uzhhorod – 2012
- Andreas Sassen – Dnipro Dnipropetrovsk – 1995

== Ghana ==
- Daniel Addo – Zorya Luhansk – 2011–13
- Prince Kwabena Adu – Kryvbas Kryvyi Rih – 2023–25
- Ernest Antwi – Rukh Lviv, Lviv – 2020–21
- **Mark Assinor** – **LNZ Cherkasy** – 2024–
- Derek Boateng – Dnipro Dnipropetrovsk – 2011–12
- **Nicholas Osei Bonsu** – **Livyi Bereh Kyiv** – 2026–
- Samuel Inkoom – Dnipro Dnipropetrovsk – 2011–14
- Mohammed Kadiri – Dynamo Kyiv, Chornomorets Odesa – 2019–20, 2021–22
- Kwame Karikari – Stal Kamianske – 2016–17
- **Raymond Owusu** – Zorya Luhansk, Metalist 1925 Kharkiv, **Kudrivka** – 2020–22, 2023–24, 2025–

== Greece ==
- Sotiris Balafas – Hoverla Uzhhorod – 2012–14
- Panagiotis Lagos – Vorskla Poltava – 2013–14
- Vasilios Pliatsikas – Metalurh Donetsk – 2014, 2015–16
- **Konstantinos Stamoulis** – **Veres Rivne** – 2025–

== Guadeloupe ==
- Ange-Freddy Plumain – Rukh Lviv – 2023–25
- Nathanaël Saintini – Kryvbas Kryvyi Rih – 2023–24

== Guinea ==
- Fousseni Bamba – Chornomorets Odesa
- Ismaël Bangoura – Dynamo Kyiv – 2007–09
- Sékou Condé – Dnipro Dnipropetrovsk, Olimpik Donetsk
- Mohamed Alkhaly Soumah – Karpaty Lviv

== Guinea-Bissau ==
- Pelé – Arsenal Kyiv – 2012–13

== Guyana ==
- Osaze De Rosario – Rukh Lviv – 2021–22

== Haiti ==
- Yassin Fortuné – Polissya Zhytomyr – 2023–24

== Hungary ==
- Tamás Kádár – Dynamo Kyiv – 2016–20
- László Bodnár – Dynamo Kyiv, Arsenal Kyiv – 2000–04
- Balázs Farkas – Dynamo Kyiv – 2006–08
- Zsolt Nagy – Oleksandriya, Zakarpattia Uzhhorod, Chornomorets Odesa – 2002–03, 2004–06

== Iceland ==
- Ragnar Sigurðsson – Rukh Lviv – 2020–21
- Árni Vilhjálmsson – Chornomorets Odesa, Kolos Kovalivka – 2018–20

== Iran ==
- Allahyar Sayyadmanesh – Zorya Luhansk – 2020–22
- Shahab Zahedi – Olimpik Donetsk, Zorya Luhansk – 2019–22

== Israel ==
- Joel Abu Hanna – Zorya Luhansk – 2019–21
- Arad Bar – LNZ Cherkasy – 2023–25
- Ofek Biton – Polissya Zhytomyr – 2024–25
- Max Grechkin – Zorya Luhansk – 2020–21
- Guy Hadida – Chornomorets Odesa – 2022–24
- Osama Khalaila – LNZ Cherkasy – 2024–25
- Hisham Layous – Karpaty Lviv – 2019–20
- Stav Lemkin – Shakhtar Donetsk – 2023–24
- Bar Lin – Kryvbas Kryvyi Rih – 2025–26
- **Roy Nawi** – **Kryvbas Kryvyi Rih** – 2026–
- Gal Shish – Volyn Lutsk – 2013–15
- Manor Solomon – Shakhtar Donetsk – 2019–23
- Tomer Yosefi – Polissya Zhytomyr – 2024–26

== Italy ==
- Cauan Baptistella – Metalist 1925 Kharkiv – 2025–26
- Cristiano Lucarelli – Shakhtar Donetsk – 2007
- Gaetano Monachello – Metalurh Donetsk – 2012

== Ivory Coast ==
- Jocelin Behiratche – Oleksandriya – 2025–26
- Yannick Boli – Zorya Luhansk – 2013–14
- Franck Dja Djédjé – Chornomorets Odesa – 2012–13
- Abdoulaye Djiré – Metalurh Donetsk, Metalist Kharkiv – 2006–07, 2008
- Geo Danny Ekra – Olimpik Donetsk – 2021
- Igor Lolo – Metalurh Donetsk, Dnipro Dnipropetrovsk – 2004–05, 2008
- Franck Madou – Zorya Luhansk – 2010–12
- Arsène Né – Metalurh Donetsk – 2004–07
- Marco Né – Tavriya Simferopol – 2012–13
- Jean Morel Poé – Kryvbas Kryvyi Rih – 2023–25
- Shaib Touré – Stal Alchevsk – 2007
- Yaya Touré – Metalurh Donetsk – 2004–05
- Venance Zézé – Metalurh Donetsk, Metalist Kharkiv

== Jamaica ==
- Kaheem Parris – Dynamo Kyiv – 2022–23
- **Shakeone Satchwell** – **Kryvbas Kryvyi Rih** – 2026–

== Kazakhstan ==
- Vitaliy Abramov – Shakhtar Donetsk, Metalurh Donetsk, Zirka Kirovohrad
- Oleg Chukhleba – Zorya Luhansk, Dnipro Dnipropetrovsk
- Oleg Kapustnikov – Metalurh Donetsk
- Sergey Kostyuk – Chornomorets Odesa, Vorskla Poltava, Metalist Kharkiv
- Konstantin Ledovskikh – Dnipro Dnipropetrovsk
- Aleksandr Martynenko – Zorya Luhansk – 1992
- Sergey Patsay – Zorya Luhansk – 1992
- Konstantin Pavlyuchenko – Nyva Ternopil, Dnipro Dnipropetrovsk, Kryvbas Kryvyi Rih
- Daniil Richard – Nyva Vinnytsia
- Fanas Salimov – Nyva Ternopil, Kryvbas Kryvyi Rih, Mykolaiv
- Anton Shokh – Nyva Ternopil, Kremin Kremenchuk, Mykolaiv
- Sergey Timofeev – Nyva Ternopil
- Evgeniy Yarovenko – Nyva Ternopil, Dnipro Dnipropetrovsk, Kryvbas Kryvyi Rih, Metalurh Zaporizhzhia – 1992–93, 1995–97
- Sergey Zhunenko – Zorya Luhansk, Shakhtar Donetsk, Metalurh Donetsk

== Korea Republic (South Korea) ==
- Hwang Hun-hee – Metalurh Zaporizhzhia
- Kim Pyung-rae – Metalurh Zaporizhzhia

== Kosovo ==
- Milot Avdyli – Vorskla Poltava – 2024–25
- Shpëtim Babaj – Zorya Luhansk – 2008
- Ardin Dallku – Vorskla Poltava – 2016–19
- **Lindon Emërllahu** – **Polissya Zhytomyr** – 2025–
- Betim Halimi – Olimpik Donetsk – 2019–2021
- Muharrem Jashari – LNZ Cherkasy – 2023–26
- **Ilir Krasniqi** – Kolos Kovalivka, **Polissya Zhytomyr** – 2024–
- Ismet Munishi – Vorskla Poltava – 2004–05
- Hajdin Salihu – LNZ Cherkasy – 2023–25
- **Ardit Tahiri** – **Kolos Kovalivka** – 2025–
- **Baton Zabërgja** – **Kharkiv** – 2025–

== Kuwait ==
- Naser Al-Sohi – Dynamo Kyiv – 1994–95

== Kyrgyzstan ==
- Oleksandr Aharin – Vorskla Poltava
- Beknaz Almazbekov – Rukh Lviv – 2024–26
- Tagir Fasakhov – Nyva Ternopil, Prykarpattya Ivano-Frankivsk
- Oleg Kazmirchuk – Kremin Kremenchuk, Nyva Ternopil
- Vitaliy Kobzar – Vorskla Poltava, Obolon Kyiv

== Latvia ==
- Andrejs Cigaņiks – Zorya Luhansk – 2020–21
- Kaspars Dubra – Oleksandriya – 2019–22
- Jevgenijs Gorjacilovs – Metalurh Zaporizhzhia
- Vladimirs Koļesņičenko – Chornomorets Odesa
- Igors Korabļovs – Kryvbas Kryvyi Rih
- Raimonds Laizāns – Karpaty Lviv
- Valentīns Lobaņovs – Metalurh Zaporizhzhia
- Artūrs Silagailis – Kryvbas Kryvyi Rih
- Andrejs Štolcers – Shakhtar Donetsk
- Māris Verpakovskis – Dynamo Kyiv – 2004–06
- Armands Zeiberliņš – Metalurh Zaporizhzhia

== Lithuania ==
- Vidas Alunderis – Metalist Kharkiv, Tavriya Simferopol
- Andrius Brazauskas – Metalurh Zaporizhzhia
- Edgaras Česnauskis – Dynamo Kyiv
- Andrius Gedgaudas – Metalurh Donetsk
- Dainius Gleveckas – Shakhtar Donetsk, Illichivets Mariupol – 1998–2005
- Kęstutis Ivaškevičius – Kryvbas Kryvyi Rih
- Andrius Jokšas – Kryvbas Kryvyi Rih, CSKA Kyiv, Arsenal Kyiv, Vorskla Poltava, Tavriya Simferopol
- Mindaugas Kalonas – Metalurh Zaporizhzhia
- Donatas Kazlauskas – Lviv – 2020–21
- Linas Klimavičius – Dnipro Dnipropetrovsk
- Aurimas Kučys – Naftovyk-Ukrnafta Okhtyrka, Zakarpattia Uzhhorod
- Gintaras Kvitkauskas – Dynamo Kyiv, Veres Rivne – 1992–93
- Vytautas Lukša – Illichivets Mariupol, Arsenal Kyiv
- Valdemaras Martinkėnas – Dynamo Kyiv – 1992–93
- Darius Miceika – Metalurh Zaporizhzhia
- Saulius Mikoliūnas – Arsenal Kyiv
- Igoris Pankratjevas – Dynamo Kyiv, Zorya Luhansk, Nyva Ternopil
- Gediminas Paulauskas – Illichivets Mariupol
- Gytis Paulauskas – Kolos Kovalivka – 2023–25
- Daniel Romanovskij – Olimpik Donetsk – 2019–21
- Mantas Samusiovas – Illichivets Mariupol
- Marius Skinderis – Stal Alchevsk, Metalurh Donetsk
- Nerijus Vasiliauskas – Tavriya Simferopol
- Audrius Veikutis – Tavriya Simferopol
- Vidmantas Vyšniauskas – Tavriya Simferopol – 1992–93
- Irmantas Zelmikas – Tavriya Simferopol

== Luxembourg ==
- Tim Hall – Karpaty Lviv – 2019–20
- Enes Mahmutović – Lviv – 2020–22
- Marvin Martins – Karpaty Lviv – 2019–20
- Gerson Rodrigues – Dynamo Kyiv – 2019–22
- Olivier Thill – Vorskla Poltava, LNZ Cherkasy – 2020–22, 2023–25

== Mali ==
- Siaka Bagayoko – Mynai – 2020–22
- **Ibrahim Kane** – Vorskla Poltava, **Kolos Kovalivka** – 2018–
- Bakary Konaté – Kryvbas Kryvyi Rih – 2024–26
- Dramane Traoré – Metalurh Donetsk – 2011–13

== Mauritania ==
- **Papa Ndiaga Yade** – Oleksandriya, **LNZ Cherkasy** – 2025–

== Mexico ==
- Nery Castillo – Shakhtar Donetsk, Dnipro Dnipropetrovsk –

== Moldova ==
- Serghei Alexeev – Zakarpattia Uzhhorod – 2009–10
- Igor Andronic – Zakarpattia Uzhhorod – 2009–10
- Valeriu Andronic – Metalist Kharkiv – 2005
- **Vladislav Baboglo** – Oleksandriya, **Karpaty Lviv** – 2017–
- Victor Barîșev – Kharkiv – 2005
- Andrian Bogdan – Zorya Luhansk – 2006
- Vitalie Bordian – Metalist Kharkiv, Hoverla Uzhhorod – 2005–12
- Vadim Bolohan – Zorya Luhansk, Zakarpattia Uzhhorod, Sevastopol, Karpaty Lviv – 2008–11, 2012
- Igor Bugaiov – Chornomorets Odesa, Metalurh Zaporizhzhia
- Vasile Caraus – Metalurh Zaporizhzhia
- Valeriu Catinsus – Chornomorets Odesa
- Boris Cebotari – Volyn Lutsk
- Andrei Cojuhar – Chornomorets Odesa, Veres Rivne – 2018–19, 2024–26
- Victor Comleonoc – Obolon Kyiv
- Vladimir Cosse – Zirka Kirovohrad, Tavriya Simferopol
- Serghei Covalciuc – Karpaty Lviv
- Cătălin Cucoș – Kolos Kovalivka – 2023–24
- Serghei Epureanu – Vorskla Poltava, Kryvbas Kryvyi Rih
- Vladimir Gaidamașciuc – Nyva Vinnytsia, Bukovyna Chernivtsi
- Mihail Ghecev – Veres Rivne – 2021–24
- Alexandru Golban – Karpaty Lviv
- Alexandru Guzun – Nyva Vinnytsia
- Gheorghe Harea – Nyva Vinnytsia, Metalist Kharkiv
- Denis Ilescu – Kryvbas Kryvyi Rih
- Oleg Khromtsov – Borysfen Boryspil
- Serghei Lașcencov – Metalist Kharkiv, Illichivets Mariupol, Karpaty Lviv – 2004–08
- Vladislav Lungu – Vorskla Poltava
- Iurie Miterev – Chornomorets Odesa, Zorya Luhansk
- Alexandru Onica – Vorskla Poltava
- Igor Oprea – Chornomorets Odesa
- Alexandru Popovici – Dnipro Dnipropetrovsk, Kryvbas Kryvyi Rih, Zorya Luhansk – 2003–07
- Marcel Reșitca – Metalurh Zaporizhzhia, Zakarpattia Uzhhorod
- Alexei Savinov – Metalurh Zaporizhzhia, Volyn Lutsk, Zakarpattia Uzhhorod
- Gheorghe Stratulat – Dnipro Dnipropetrovsk
- Andrei Stroenco – Odesa, Kryvbas Kryvyi Rih
- Alexandru Suharev – Dnipro Dnipropetrovsk
- Vladimir Tanurcov – Stal Alchevsk
- Igor Țîgîrlaș – Metalist Kharkiv, Kharkiv, Metalurh Zaporizhzhia
- Eduard Văluță – Metalurh Zaporizhzhia, Naftovyk-Ukrnafta Okhtyrka

== Montenegro ==
- Miodrag Džudović – Volyn Lutsk – 2004–05 ( (Serbia and Montenegro) while active)
- Mladen Kašćelan – Karpaty Lviv
- Marko Mrvaljević – Veres Rivne – 2023–25
- Aleksandar Nedović – Volyn Lutsk
- Mirko Raičević – Zorya Luhansk, Chornomorets Odesa, Zakarpattia Uzhhorod
- Demir Škrijelj – Vorskla Poltava – 2024–25

== Morocco ==
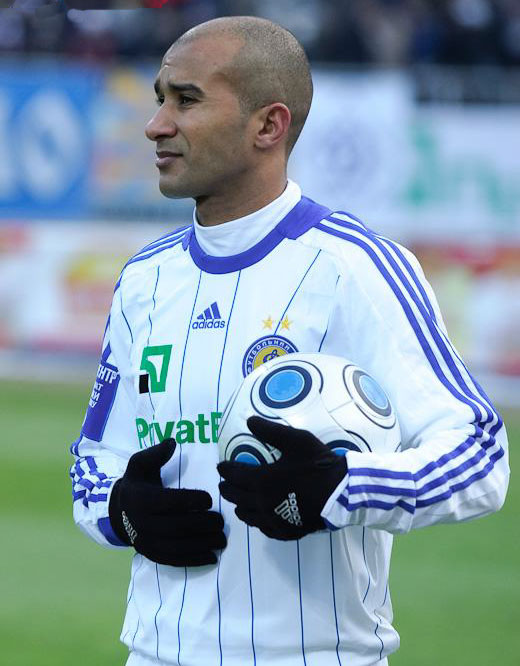
Badr El Kaddouri played 10 seasons in the Ukrainian Premier League for Dynamo Kyiv

- Chahir Belghazouani – Dynamo Kyiv
- Younès Belhanda – Dynamo Kyiv – 2013–15
- Mohamed El-Bouazzati – Zorya Luhansk
- Hicham El Hamdaoui – Zirka Kropyvnytskyi – 2017
- Badr El Kaddouri – Dynamo Kyiv
- Hicham Mahdoufi – Metalist Kharkiv
- Moha Rharsalla – Olimpik Donetsk – 2014–16, 2017

== Netherlands ==
- Sylvano Comvalius – Stal Kamianske – 2016–17
- Jordi Cruyff – Metalurh Donetsk – 2006–08
- Jeremain Lens – Dynamo Kyiv – 2013–15
- Gregory Nelson – Metalurh Donetsk – 2011–15
- Bradley de Nooijer – Vorskla Poltava – 2020–21

== Niger ==
- Amadou Moutari – Metalurh Donetsk – 2014
- Daniel Sosah – Kryvbas Kryvyi Rih – 2022–25
- Najeeb Yakubu – Vorskla Poltava – 2018–22, 2023–24

== Nigeria ==
- Aliyu Abubakar – Olimpik Donetsk – 2019–20
- Dele Adeleye – Metalurh Donetsk, Tavriya Simferopol – 2010–13
- **Victor Adeoye** – **Kudrivka** – 2025–
- Fanendo Adi – Metalurh Donetsk, Dynamo Kyiv, Tavriya Simferopol – 2010–12
- Abdulwaheed Afolabi – Tavriya Simferopol – 2011–12
- Patrick Agbo – Metalurh Donetsk – 2001–02
- Julius Aghahowa – Shakhtar Donetsk, Sevastopol – 2000–07, 2009–11
- Tony Alegbe – Metalurh Donetsk, Kryvbas Kryvyi Rih – 2001–06
- Jamiu Alimi – Tavriya Simferopol – 2011–12
- Mohammed Goyi Aliyu – Tavriya Simferopol – 2013–14
- Michael Chidi Alozie – Volyn Lutsk, Metalurh Zaporizhzhia – 2004–06, 2008–11
- **Chijioke Aniagboso** – **Chornomorets Odesa** – 2024–25, 2026–
- Edward Anyamkyegh – Karpaty Lviv – 2001–04
- Haruna Babangida – Metalurh Donetsk – 2004–06
- Michel Babatunde – Kryvbas Kryvyi Rih, Volyn Lutsk, Dnipro Dnipropetrovsk – 2010–16
- Benito – Dynamo Kyiv, Olimpik Donetsk, Zorya Luhansk – 2019–21, 2022–25
- Ayodeji Brown – Tavriya Simferopol – 2010–11
- **Cody David** – **LNZ Cherkasy** – 2026–
- Emmanuel Dennis – Zorya Luhansk – 2016–17
- Eddy Lord Dombraye – Volyn Lutsk, Zakarpattia Uzhhorod – 2003–06, 2007–08
- Bright Enobakhare – Rukh Lviv – 2022–23
- Joseph Eyimofe – Metalurh Donetsk – 2005–06
- Chinedu Geoffrey – Olimpik Donetsk – 2019–20
- Samson Godwin – Karpaty Lviv, Volyn Lutsk – 2001–04, 2006–12, 2013–14
- Stephen Gopey – Inhulets Petrove – 2021–22
- Lukman Haruna – Dynamo Kyiv, Hoverla Uzhhorod – 2011–15
- Lucky Idahor – Dynamo Kyiv, Vorskla Poltava, Karpaty Lviv, Tavriya Simferopol, Zorya Luhansk – 2001–04, 2006–14
- Brown Ideye – Dynamo Kyiv – 2011–14
- Harmony Ikande – Hoverla Uzhhorod – 2013–14
- Pius Ikedia – Metalurh Donetsk – 2007–08
- Clement Ikenna – Kryvbas Kryvyi Rih – 2024–25
- Jack Ipalibo – Chornomorets Odesa – 2023–24
- Sheriff Isa – Olimpik Donetsk, Chornomorets Odesa – 2014–17
- **Peter Itodo** – **Kharkiv** – 2025–
- Samson Iyede – Chornomorets Odesa, Vorskla Poltava – 2023–25
- Sani Kaita – Metalist Kharkiv, Tavriya Simferopol – 2010–12
- Olarenwaju Kayode – Shakhtar Donetsk – 2017–19
- Sunny Ekeh Kingsley – Metalurh Donetsk – 2008–10
- Akeem Latifu – Stal Dniprodzerzhynsk – 2015–16
- **Christian Mba** – Metalist 1925 Kharkiv, **Chornomorets Odesa** – 2025–
- Francis Momoh – LNZ Cherkasy – 2024–26
- Charles Newuche – Zakarpattia Uzhhorod – 2007–08, 2009–10
- Daniel Njoku – Vorskla Poltava – 1997–99
- Christopher Nwaeze – Zorya Luhansk – 2024–25
- Kelvin Ebuka Nwamora – Olimpik Donetsk – 2015–16
- Onyekachi Nwoha – Metalist Kharkiv, Zorya Luhansk – 2006–08
- Chukwudi Nworgu – Vorskla-Naftohaz Poltava, Kryvbas Kryvyi Rih – 2002–04
- Prosper Obah – LNZ Cherkasy, Shakhtar Donetsk – 2025–26
- Michael Odibe – Arsenal Kyiv, Dnipro Dnipropetrovsk – 2011–14
- **Edwin Odinaka** – **Bukovyna Chernivtsi** – 2026–
- Ugochukwu Oduenyi – Mynai – 2020–21
- Shola Ogundana – Dynamo Kyiv – 2025–26
- Ochuko Ojobo – Metalurh Donetsk – 2005–06
- Gabriel Okechukwu – Karpaty Lviv – 2015–17
- Emmanuel Okoduwa – Vorskla Poltava, Arsenal Kyiv, Shakhtar Donetsk, Metalurh Donetsk – 2001–08
- Isaac Okoronkwo – Shakhtar Donetsk – 2000–03
- Samuel Okunowo – Metalurh Donetsk, Stal Alchevsk – 2005–07
- Harrison Omoko – Arsenal Kyiv, Vorskla-Naftohaz Poltava, Volyn Lutsk, Tavriya Simferopol, Zorya Luhansk – 2002–11
- Nurudeen Orelesi – Metalurh Zaporizhzhia – 2014–16
- Mathias Oyewusi – Kolos Kovalivka – 2025–26
- Abayomi Owonikoko Seun – Volyn Lutsk – 2012–13
- Taye Taiwo – Dynamo Kyiv – 2012–13
- Frank Temile – Dynamo Kyiv, Oleksandriya – 2008–09, 2011–12
- Uchechukwu Uwakwe – Tavriya Simferopol – 2000–03
- **Adam Yakubu** – **LNZ Cherkasy** – 2025–
- Ayila Yussuf – Dynamo Kyiv, Metalist Kharkiv – 2003–15

== North Macedonia ==
- Matej Angelov – LNZ Cherkasy – 2024–25
- Martin Bogatinov – Karpaty Lviv – 2010–13
- Besir Demiri – Mariupol – 2017–19
- Filip Despotovski – Vorskla Poltava – 2007–10
- Mario Gjurovski – Metalurh Donetsk – 2010–12
- Igor Gjuzelov – Shakhtar Donetsk, Metalurh Donetsk – 2001–06
- Boban Grnčarov – Metalurh Donetsk, Stal Alchevsk, Tavriya Simferopol – 2002–03, 2004–2007, 2013–14
- Besart Ibraimi – Sevastopol, Tavriya Simferopol, Metalurh Zaporizhzhia – 2010–13
- Demir Imeri – Olimpik Donetsk – 2019–20
- Adis Jahović – Vorskla Poltava – 2013–14
- Stefan Jevtoski – Arsenal Kyiv – 2018–19
- Hristijan Kirovski – Metalurh Zaporizhzhia – 2004–05
- Vlade Lazarevski – Metalist Kharkiv, Karpaty Lviv – 2007–08, 2009–10
- Aleksandar Lazevski – Hoverla Uzhhorod – 2013–14
- Dančo Masev – Metalurh Zaporizhzhia – 2005–07
- Igor Mitreski – Metalurh Zaporizhzhia – 2005–06
- Goran Popov – Dynamo Kyiv – 2010–13
- Reshat Ramadani – Dynamo Kyiv – 2022–24
- Agron Rufati – Zorya Luhansk – 2020–22
- Dušan Savić – Volyn Lutsk, Hoverla Uzhhorod – 2011–14
- Vanče Šikov – Volyn Lutsk – 2011–14
- Stefan Spirovski – Mariupol – 2021–22
- Luka Stankovski – Kolos Kovalivka – 2025–26
- Alban Taipi – Kudrivka – 2025–26
- Darko Tasevski – Metalurh Zaporizhzhia – 2005–07
- Ennur Totre – Vorskla Poltava – 2022–23
- Gjoko Zajkov – Vorskla Poltava – 2022–23

== Panama ==
- **Eduardo Guerrero** – Zorya Luhansk, **Dynamo Kyiv** – 2022–
- **Giovany Herbert** – **Kryvbas Kryvyi Rih** – 2025–
- **Joseph Jones** – **Kryvbas Kryvyi Rih** – 2025–
- Anel Ryce – Chornomorets Odesa – 2024–25
- **Reynaldiño Verley** – Zorya Luhansk, **Kudrivka** – 2025–

== Paraguay ==
- Aldo Adorno – Metalurh Donetsk – 2014–15
- Derlis González – Dynamo Kyiv – 2015–18

== Peru ==
- José Carlos Fernández – Chornomorets Odesa
- Paolo de la Haza – Chornomorets Odesa
- Andrés Mendoza – Metalurh Donetsk – 2004–05, 2006–07
- Edgar Villamarín – Chornomorets Odesa

== Poland ==
- Marcin Burkhardt – Metalist Kharkiv – 2009–10
- Piotr Cetnarowicz – Kryvbas Kryvyi Rih – 2003–04
- Seweryn Gancarczyk – Arsenal Kyiv, Volyn Lutsk, Metalist Kharkiv – 2002–10
- Paweł Hajduczek – Tavriya Simferopol, Metalurh Zaporizhzhia – 2007–11
- Dawid Janczyk – Oleksandriya – 2011–12
- **Tomasz Kędziora** – **Dynamo Kyiv** – 2017–23, 2026–
- Maciej Kowalczyk – Arsenal Kyiv – 2002–06
- Wojciech Kowalewski – Shakhtar Donetsk – 2001–03
- Mariusz Lewandowski – Shakhtar Donetsk, Sevastopol – 2001–11, 2013–14
- Maciej Nalepa – Karpaty Lviv, Kharkiv – 2001–04, 2006–09
- Marcin Nowak – Volyn Lutsk – 2004–05
- Wojciech Szymanek – Chornomorets Odesa – 2011–12
- Łukasz Teodorczyk – Dynamo Kyiv – 2014–16
- Jakub Tosik – Karpaty Lviv – 2012–13

== Portugal ==
- Vitorino Antunes – Dynamo Kyiv – 2014–17
- Artur – Chornomorets Odesa – 2012
- Bandeira – Kryvbas Kryvyi Rih – 2023–26
- David Caiado – Tavriya Simferopol, Metalist Kharkiv – 2014, 2015
- Miguel Campos – Oleksandriya – 2023–26
- China – Metalurh Donetsk – 2009–12
- Ricardo Fernandes – Metalurh Donetsk – 2008–09, 2011
- Bruno Gama – Dnipro Dnipropetrovsk – 2013–16
- Zé Gomes – Chornomorets Odesa – 2023–24
- **André Gonçalves** – Polissya Zhytomyr, **Veres Rivne** – 2024–
- **João Machado** – **Kryvbas Kryvyi Rih** – 2026–
- Nélson Monte – Dnipro-1 – 2021–22
- **Jimmy Mpanzu** – **Kryvbas Kryvyi Rih** – 2026–
- Nuno Pinto – Tavriya Simferopol – 2014
- Cristian Ponde – Karpaty Lviv – 2018–19
- Serginho – Metalurh Zaporizhzhia – 2013–14
- Mário Sérgio – Metalurh Donetsk – 2008–12
- Filipe Teixeira – Metalurh Donetsk – 2010–11
- João Teixeira – Oleksandriya – 2019
- Tiago Terroso – Chornomorets Odesa – 2012
- Miguel Veloso – Dynamo Kyiv – 2012–16

== Republic of Ireland ==
- Darren O'Dea – Metalurh Donetsk

== Romania ==
- Marian Aliuță – Shakhtar Donetsk, Metalurh Donetsk
- Cătălin Anghel – Stal Alchevsk
- Iulian Arhire – Volyn Lutsk, Metalurh Donetsk
- Tudor Băluță – Dynamo Kyiv – 2020–21
- Vladislav Blănuță – Dynamo Kyiv – 2025–26
- Cosmin Bărcăuan – Shakhtar Donetsk
- Daniel Baston – Metalurh Zaporizhzhia
- Eric Bicfalvi – Volyn Lutsk
- Cornel Buta – Volyn Lutsk
- Lucian Burdujan – Chornomorets Odesa, Tavriya Simferopol, Hoverla Uzhhorod
- Florin Cernat – Dynamo Kyiv
- Augustin Chiriță – Karpaty Lviv
- Daniel Chiriță – Shakhtar Donetsk, Stal Alchevsk
- Răzvan Cociș – Karpaty Lviv, Hoverla Uzhhorod
- Valentin Cojocaru – Dnipro-1 – 2021–22
- Alexandru Dandea – Hoverla Uzhhorod
- Iulian Dăniță – Tavriya Simferopol, Metalist Kharkiv – 2002–03, 2004–05
- Constantin Dima – Desna Chernihiv – 2020–21
- Lucian Dobre – Tavriya Simferopol
- Dan Găldeanu – Dnipro Dnipropetrovsk, Kryvbas Kryvyi Rih
- Daniel Florea – Shakhtar Donetsk, Metalurh Donetsk, Metalurh Zaporizhzhia
- Tiberiu Ghioane – Dynamo Kyiv – 2001–11
- Bogdan Hauși – Hoverla Uzhhorod
- Cristian Irimia – Dynamo Kyiv
- Silviu Izvoranu – Volyn Lutsk
- Mihai Leca – Lviv – 2021–22
- Catalin Lichioiu – Vorskla Poltava
- Bogdan Mara – Stal Alchevsk
- Florentin Matei – Volyn Lutsk
- Ciprian Marica – Shakhtar Donetsk
- Ionuț Mazilu – Dnipro Dnipropetrovsk, Arsenal Kyiv
- Florinel Mirea – Stal Alchevsk
- Marius Mitu – Metalurh Donetsk – 2006–07
- Adrian Neaga – Volyn Lutsk
- Marius Niculae – Hoverla Uzhhorod
- Cristian Oroș – Hoverla Uzhhorod
- Florin Pârvu – Stal Alchevsk
- Ionel Pârvu – Metalurh Zaporizhzhia, Tavriya Simferopol
- Sorin Paraschiv – Volyn Lutsk
- Răzvan Raț – Shakhtar Donetsk
- Marian Savu – Shakhtar Donetsk, Metalurh Donetsk
- Constantin Schumacher – Volyn Lutsk
- Flavius Stoican – Shakhtar Donetsk, Metalist Kharkiv
- Florin Șoavă – Arsenal Kyiv
- Ciprian Tănasă – Metalurh Donetsk
- Alexandru Tudose – Hoverla Uzhhorod
- Ciprian Vasilache – Vorskla Poltava – 2013–14
- Alexandru Vlad – Dnipro Dnipropetrovsk
- Ștefan Vlădoiu – Kolos Kovalivka – 2024–25

== Russia ==
- Magomed Adiev – Kryvbas Kryvyi Rih
- Guram Adzhoyev – Metalist Kharkiv – 1992–93
- Eduard Akbarov – Nyva Vinnytsia
- Andrey Aleksanenkov – Dynamo Kyiv, Mykolaiv – 1992–93, 1994–95
- Maksim Aristarkhov – Arsenal Kyiv, Metalurh Zaporizhzhia, Zorya Luhansk
- Erik Ashurbekov – Metalist Kharkiv
- Aleksei Bakharev – Shakhtar Donetsk
- Vyacheslav Bakharev – Chornomorets Odesa
- Sergei Barkalov – Kremin Kremenchuk
- Lev Berezner – Bukovyna Chernivtsi
- Sergei Bespalykh – Dnipro Dnipropetrovsk, Prykarpattya Ivano-Frankivsk
- Sergei Bozhko – Zorya Luhansk, Stal Alchevsk
- Aleksandr Danishevsky – Arsenal Kyiv
- Andriy Demchenko – Metalurh Zaporizhzhia – 1998–07, 2009–10
- Maksim Demenko – Dynamo Kyiv
- Andrey Eshchenko – Dynamo Kyiv, Dnipro Dnipropetrovsk, Arsenal Kyiv
- Andrei Fedkov – Kremin Kremenchuk, Shakhtar Donetsk
- Aleksandr Filimonov – Dynamo Kyiv – 2001
- Vadim Firsov – Zirka Kirovohrad
- Andrei Gashkin – Nyva Ternopil, Chornomorets Odesa
- Yuri Gatilov – Volyn Lutsk
- Aleksei Gerasimenko – Dynamo Kyiv – 1997–2001
- Yuri Getikov – Tavriya Simferopol, Temp Shepetivka – 1992–93, 1994–95
- Valeri Gitya-Petrinsky – Nyva Vinnytsia, Tavriya Simferopol
- Sergei Gladyshev – Tavriya Simferopol – 1992
- Aleksandr Gorin – Kryvbas Kryvyi Rih
- Aleksandr Gorshkov – Nyva Vinnytsia, Chornomorets Odesa
- Vitali Grishin – Vorskla Poltava
- Dmitri Gulenkov – Tavriya Simferopol – 1992–93
- Rolan Gusev – Dnipro Dnipropetrovsk, Arsenal Kyiv
- Aleksei Igonin – Chornomorets Odesa
- Aleksei Ilyin – Veres Rivne
- Konstantin Kamnev – Chornomorets Odesa
- Andrei Karyaka – Metalurh Zaporizhzhia, CSKA Kyiv
- Dmitri Korneev – Veres Rivne
- Sergei Kosilov – Tavriya Simferopol
- Anatoli Kretov – Naftovyk-Ukrnafta Okhtyrka
- Stanislav Kriulin – Kryvbas Kryvyi Rih
- Sergei Kryuchikhin – Arsenal Kyiv
- German Kutarba – Arsenal Kyiv, Metalurh Zaporizhzhia, Tavriya Simferopol
- Vladimir Kuzmichyov – Dynamo Kyiv
- Nikolay Kuznetsov – Temp Shepetivka
- Vladimir Lebed – Dnipro Dnipropetrovsk, Chornomorets Odesa – 1992–94
- Sergei Lysenko – Chornomorets Odesa
- Marat Makhmutov – Chornomorets Odesa
- Aleksandr Malygin – Zorya Luhansk, Illichivets Mariupol, Zakarpattia Uzhhorod
- Sergei Mamchur – Dnipro Dnipropetrovsk – 1992–93
- Ramiz Mamedov – Dynamo Kyiv
- Vitali Markov – Bukovyna Chernivtsi
- Vladislav Mayorov – Kryvbas Kryvyi Rih
- Oleg Mekhov – Veres Rivne
- Eduard Mor – Volyn Lutsk
- Marat Mulashev – Tavriya Simferopol – 1992
- Valentin Nefyodov – Chornomorets Odesa, Naftovyk-Ukrnafta Okhtyrka, Illichivets Mariupol
- Yuriy Nikiforov – Chornomorets Odesa – 1992–93
- Gennadiy Nizhegorodov – Chornomorets Odesa
- Vladislav Novikov – Tavriya Simferopol
- Karen Oganyan – Metalist Kharkiv
- Aleksandr Orekhov – Arsenal Kyiv
- Sergei Osipov – Chornomorets Odesa
- Valeri Panchik – Metalist Kharkiv
- Andrei Panfyorov – Kryvbas Kryvyi Rih
- Oleg Petrov – Veres Rivne – 1992–93
- Yuri Petrov – Mykolaiv, Volyn Lutsk, Metalist Kharkiv
- Andrei Pletnyov – Zorya Luhansk
- Sergei Polstyanov – Nyva Ternopil, Tavriya Simferopol
- Aleksandr Ponomaryov – Chornomorets Odesa – 2009–10
- Sergei Pravkin – Kryvbas Kryvyi Rih
- Sergei Prikhodko – Chornomorets Odesa
- Murad Ramazanov – Kryvbas Kryvyi Rih
- Sergei Ryzhikh – Metalist Kharkiv, Zakarpattia Uzhhorod
- Oleg Salenko – Dynamo Kyiv – 1992
- Sergey Samodin – Dnipro Dnipropetrovsk, Arsenal Kyiv
- Yevgeni Saprykin – Metalurh Zaporizhzhia
- Eduard Sarkisov – Prykarpattya Ivano-Frankivsk
- Aleksei Savelyev – Vorskla Poltava
- Valeri Shevyrev – Metalurh Zaporizhzhia
- Aleksandr Shmarko – Shakhtar Donetsk
- Sergei Shumilin – Kryvbas Kryvyi Rih
- Oleg Simakov – Kryvbas Kryvyi Rih
- Anatoli Skvortsov – Tavriya Simferopol
- Dmitri Smirnov – Tavriya Simferopol – 1992
- Aleksei Snigiryov – Veres Rivne
- Yuri Sobol – Vorskla Poltava, Kremin Kremenchuk
- Andrei Solomatin – Obolon Kyiv
- Aleksandr Sonin – Arsenal Kyiv
- Igor Strelkov – Shakhtar Donetsk
- Ruslan Suanov – Metalurh Zaporizhzhia
- Sergei Sukhoruchenkov – Kryvbas Kryvyi Rih, Chornomorets Odesa
- Vladislav Ternavsky – Nyva Ternopil, Chornomorets Odesa
- Valeri Tkachuk – Torpedo Zaporizhzhia, Metalurh Zaporizhzhia
- Sergei Tkachyov – Metalist Kharkiv
- Dmitri Travin – Temp Shepetivka
- Sergei Troitskiy – Kremin Kremenchuk
- Akhrik Tsveiba – Dynamo Kyiv – 1992–93
- Ilya Tsymbalar – Chornomorets Odesa – 1992–93
- Aleksei Uvarov – Chornomorets Odesa, Arsenal Kyiv
- Kirill Varaksin – Metalurh Zaporizhzhia
- Yevgeni Varlamov – Metalist Kharkiv – 2004–06
- Sergei Vasilyev – Metalist Kharkiv
- Vyaczeslav Vishnevskiy – Tavriya Simferopol
- Roman Yemelyanov – Zorya Luhansk
- Valery Yesipov – Dynamo Kyiv – 1992
- Roman Yevmenyev – Zirka Kirovohrad
- Aleksandr Zarutskiy – Tavriya Simferopol
- Vladimir Zinich – Torpedo Zaporizhzhia

== Rwanda ==
- Djihad Bizimana – Kryvbas Kryvyi Rih – 2023–25
- **David Niyo** – **Veres Rivne** – 2025–

== Senegal ==
- Mamadou Danfa – Kolos Kovalivka – 2019–22
- Pape Diakhaté – Dynamo Kyiv – 2007–10, 2011–12
- Samba Diallo – Dynamo Kyiv, Rukh Lviv – 2022–24, 2025–26
- Matar Dieye – Olimpik Donetsk, Karpaty Lviv – 2018–20
- **Pape Malick Fall** – **Livyi Bereh Kyiv** – 2026–
- Roger Gomis – Mariupol – 2017–18
- Papa Gueye – Volyn Lutsk, Metalist Kharkiv, Dnipro Dnipropetrovsk, Karpaty Lviv, Dnipro-1 – 2004–16, 2018–20
- Assane N'Diaye – Shakhtar Donetsk – 2000–03
- Alioune Ndour – Zorya Luhansk – 2023–25
- Issa Ndoye – Volyn Lutsk – 2010–11
- **Assane Seck** – **Kryvbas Kryvyi Rih** – 2025–
- **Mor Talla** – **Bukovyna Chernivtsi** – 2026–
- **Aliou Thiaré** – **Dynamo Kyiv** – 2025–
- Demba Touré – Dynamo Kyiv – 2006–07

== Serbia ==
- Miodrag Anđelković – Metalurh Zaporizhzhia
- Branko Ašković – Kryvbas Kryvyi Rih
- Branko Baković – Naftovyk-Ukrnafta Okhtyrka
- Ilija Borenović – Kryvbas Kryvyi Rih
- Siniša Branković – Chornomorets Odesa
- Aleksandar Brđanin – Metalurh Zaporizhzhia
- Mirko Bunjevčević – Arsenal Kyiv, Zorya Luhansk
- Mihajlo Cakić – Zorya Luhansk
- Saša Cilinšek – Tavriya Simferopol
- Goran Ćosić – Kryvbas Kryvyi Rih
- Marko Dević – Volyn Lutsk, Metalist Kharkiv – 2005–08 ( (Serbia and Montenegro) while active)
- Vladimir Dišljenković – Metalurh Donetsk, Metalist Kharkiv – 2005–10 ( (Serbia and Montenegro) while active)
- Igor Duljaj – Shakhtar Donetsk, Sevastopol
- Darko Dunjić – Kryvbas Kryvyi Rih, Zorya Luhansk
- Igor Đinović – Vorskla Poltava, Kryvbas Kryvyi Rih
- Slavoljub Đorđević – Volyn Lutsk, Kryvbas Kryvyi Rih
- Goran Gavrančić – Dynamo Kyiv
- Marko Grubelić – Metalurh Donetsk, Stal Alchevsk
- Miroslav Grumić – Vorskla Poltava
- Ivan Gvozdenović – Metalurh Donetsk
- Ivica Janićijević – Karpaty Lviv
- Marko Jovanović – Chornomorets Odesa – 2007–08
- Milan Jovanović – Shakhtar Donetsk – 2002–03 ( (Serbia and Montenegro) while active)
- Damir Kahriman – Tavriya Simferopol
- Nenad Lalatović – Shakhtar Donetsk
- Đorđe Lazić – Metalurh Donetsk
- Željko Ljubenović – Kryvbas Kryvyi Rih, Tavriya Simferopol
- Jovan Markoski – Vorskla Poltava
- Marjan Marković – Dynamo Kyiv
- Slobodan Marković – Metalurh Donetsk, Tavriya Simferopol – 2004–05, 2007–11 ( (Serbia and Montenegro) while active)
- Petar Mićin – Zorya Luhansk – 2023–26
- Vladimir Mićović – Tavriya Simferopol
- Vladimir Milenković – Vorskla Poltava
- Uroš Milosavljević – Metalurh Zaporizhzhia, Volyn Lutsk
- Ivan Milošević – Karpaty Lviv
- Marko Milovanović – Tavriya Simferopol
- Saša Mitić – Volyn Lutsk – 2004–05 ( (Serbia and Montenegro) while active)
- Nenad Mladenović – Metalurh Donetsk
- Miljan Mrdaković – Metalist Kharkiv
- Bojan Neziri – Metalurh Donetsk – 2003–05, 2006–07 ( (Serbia and Montenegro) while active)
- Miloš Ninković – Dynamo Kyiv – 2004–13 ( (Serbia and Montenegro) while active)
- Milan Obradović – Metalist Kharkiv
- Predrag Ocokoljić – Shakhtar Donetsk
- Perica Ognjenović – Dynamo Kyiv
- Aleksandar Pantić – Dynamo Kyiv – 2017
- Ivan Perić – Arsenal Kyiv
- Dragan Perišić – Metalurh Zaporizhzhia
- Igor Petković – Vorskla Poltava, Zorya Luhansk
- Dušan Popović – Volyn Lutsk
- Minja Popović – Zakarpattia Uzhhorod
- Stevan Račić – Volyn Lutsk
- Ljubiša Ranković – Metalurh Zaporizhzhia
- Vladimir Ribić – Arsenal Kyiv
- Miroslav Rikanović – Zorya Luhansk
- Bratislav Ristić – Metalurh Donetsk – 2003–06, 2007 ( (Serbia and Montenegro) while active)
- Sead Salahović – Kryvbas Kryvyi Rih
- Vladimir Sandulović – Vorskla Poltava
- Miloš Stamenković – Stal Kamianske, Rukh Lviv – 2016–17, 2020–
- Saša Stević – Volyn Lutsk
- Aleksandar Stoimirović – Vorskla Poltava
- Ilija Stolica – Metalurh Donetsk – 2003–04 ( (Serbia and Montenegro) while active)
- Dušan Šimić – Karpaty Lviv
- Vučina Šćepanović – Kryvbas Kryvyi Rih
- Saša Todić – Tavriya Simferopol
- Rade Todorović – Kryvbas Kryvyi Rih – 2004–05 ( (Serbia and Montenegro) while active)
- Aleksandar Trišović – Volyn Lutsk, Kryvbas Kryvyi Rih, Metalist Kharkiv, Chornomorets Odesa, Hoverla Uzhhorod – 2004–06, 2008–10, 2012–13 ( (Serbia and Montenegro) while active)
- Nemanja Tubić – Karpaty Lviv
- Aco Vasiljević – Metalurh Zaporizhzhia
- Nikola Vasiljević – Metalurh Zaporizhzhia
- Zvonimir Vukić – Shakhtar Donetsk
- Milan Zagorac – Kryvbas Kryvyi Rih

== Sierra Leone ==
- Sallieu Bah – Zorya Luhansk – 2025–26

== Slovakia ==
- Marián Adam – Metalist Kharkiv – 2002–03
- Tomáš Bruško – Vorskla Poltava – 2002–03
- František Hanc – Karpaty Lviv – 2001–02
- Libor Hrdlička – Metalurh Zaporizhzhia – 2012–15
- František Kubík – Tavriya Simferopol, Arsenal Kyiv – 2011–14
- Ivan Lietava – Vorskla Poltava – 2012–13
- Ján Maslo – Volyn Lutsk – 2011–14
- Lukáš Štetina – Metalist Kharkiv – 2010–11
- Peter Sukovský – Karpaty Lviv – 2001–02
- Lukáš Tesák – Zorya Luhansk – 2010–12
- Ján Zolna – Metalurh Zaporizhzhia, Volyn Lutsk – 2001–02, 2003–05

== Slovenia ==
- Gregor Balažic – Karpaty Lviv – 2010–15
- Darko Bojović – Illichivets Mariupol – 2009–10
- **Kai Cipot** – **Veres Rivne** – 2025–
- Rusmin Dedić – Vorskla Poltava – 2002–04
- Erik Gliha – Rukh Lviv – 2020–21
- Miha Goropevšek – Volyn Lutsk – 2015–17
- Luka Guček – Chornomorets Odesa, Vorskla Poltava – 2022–25
- Darijan Matić – Kryvbas Kryvyi Rih – 2010–13
- Zoran Pavlović – Vorskla Poltava – 2002–04
- Matija Rom – Kolos Kovalivka – 2020–22
- Jon Šporn – Chornomorets Odesa – 2023–25
- Dalibor Stevanović – Volyn Lutsk – 2011–12
- Almir Sulejmanović – Zorya Luhansk – 2006–07
- Senad Tiganj – Karpaty Lviv – 2002–04
- Žan Trontelj – Zorya Luhansk – 2024–25
- Benjamin Verbič – Dynamo Kyiv – 2017–22
- Muamer Vugdalić – Shakhtar Donetsk – 2001–02
- David Zec – Rukh Lviv – 2020–21

== South Africa ==
- Tercious Malepe – Mynai – 2020–21

== Spain ==
- **Xeber Alkain** – **Karpaty Lviv** – 2025–
- Pablo Álvarez – Karpaty Lviv – 2024–26
- Mario Arqués – Karpaty Lviv – 2017
- **Iván Calero** – **Karpaty Lviv** – 2026–
- Marc Castells – Zirka Kropyvnytskyi – 2017
- **Jon Ceberio** – **Epitsentr Kamianets-Podilskyi** – 2025–
- **Nil Coch** – **Epitsentr Kamianets-Podilskyi** – 2025–
- Amilcar Codjovi – Vorskla Poltava – 2021–22
- Borja Ekiza – Zirka Kropyvnytskyi – 2016–17
- Aitor Fernández – Zirka Kropyvnytskyi – 2016
- Dani Fernández – Metalurh Donetsk – 2006–07
- Borja Gómez – Karpaty Lviv – 2011
- **Bruno Iglesias** – **Karpaty Lviv** – 2026–
- **Joaquinete** – Epitsentr Kamianets-Podilskyi, **Karpaty Lviv** – 2025–
- Jordi López – Hoverla Uzhhorod – 2012–13
- Cristóbal Márquez – Karpaty Lviv – 2011–12
- **Moha Moukhliss** – **Karpaty Lviv** – 2026–
- **Nene** – **Epitsentr Kamianets-Podilskyi** – 2026–
- Lucas Pérez – Karpaty Lviv – 2011–12
- Sito Riera – Chornomorets Odesa – 2012–13
- **Carlos Rojas** – **Epitsentr Kamianets-Podilskyi** – 2025–
- Fran Sol – Dynamo Kyiv – 2018–21
- **Raúl Tavares** – **Epitsentr Kamianets-Podilskyi** – 2026–

== Suriname ==
- **Justin Lonwijk** – **Dynamo Kyiv** – 2022–23, 2024–25, 2026–

== Sweden ==
- Gustav Svensson – Tavriya Simferopol – 2012–13

== Switzerland ==
- Admir Mehmedi – Dynamo Kyiv – 2012–13
- Griffin Sabatini – Dnipro-1 – 2020
- Danijel Subotić – Volyn Lutsk – 2012–13

== Tajikistan ==
- Arsen Avakov – Temp Shepetivka, Torpedo Zaporizhzhia
- Vitaliy Levchenko – CSKA Kyiv, Tavriya Simferopol
- Vitaliy Parakhnevych – Nyva Ternopil, Odesa, Chornomorets Odesa
- Khusrav Toirov – Shakhtar Donetsk, Chornomorets Odesa – 2022–23, 2024–25

== Tanzania ==
- Novatus Miroshi – Shakhtar Donetsk – 2023–24
- Yohana Mkomola – Inhulets Petrove – 2020–21

== Togo ==
- Serge Akakpo – Hoverla Uzhhorod, Arsenal Kyiv – 2013–15, 2018–19
- Kodjo Aziangbe – Zorya Luhansk – 2023–24
- Abbe Ibrahim – Kharkiv – 2007–08
- Prince Segbefia – Zorya Luhansk – 2014–15

== Tunisia ==
- Mohamed Larbi Arouri – Metalurh Zaporizhzhia
- Mohamed Ali Ben Salem – Inhulets Petrove – 2020–22
- Mohamed Ben Othman – Metalurh Zaporizhzhia
- Aymen Bouchhioua – Zorya Luhansk
- Anis Boussaidi – Metalurh Donetsk, Arsenal Kyiv
- Ameur Derbal – Kharkiv
- **Alaa Ghram** – **Shakhtar Donetsk** – 2024–
- Achraf Khalfaoui – Metalurh Zaporizhzhia
- Sofiane Melliti – Vorskla Poltava – 2004–06
- Maroine Mihoubi – Lviv – 2020–22
- Toafik Salhi – Zorya Luhansk, Sevastopol

== Turkey ==
- Erol Bulut – Metalurh Donetsk – 2007–08
- Tolga Seyhan – Shakhtar Donetsk – 2005–06

== Turkmenistan ==
- Dmitri Khomukha – Metalist Kharkiv – 1992–94
- Aleksandr Menshikov – Temp Shepetivka 1994-95
- Andriy Khomyn – Prykarpattya Ivano-Frankivsk, Dynamo Kyiv, Vorskla Poltava 1992–2000
- Roman Bondarenko – Torpedo Zaporizhzhia, Metalurh Zaporizhzhia – 1992–98, 1999–2000
- Konstantin Sosenko – Nyva Vinnytsia, Dnipro Dnipropetrovsk, CSKA Kyiv, Prykarpattya Ivano-Frankivsk 1995-2000
- Yuri Magdiýew – Nyva Ternopil 1999-2000
- Muslim Agaýew – Nyva Ternopil 1999-2000
- Igor Kislov – Vorskla Poltava, Zirka Kropyvnytskyi, Tavriya Simferopol 1996-2001
- Andrei Zavyalov – Dynamo Kyiv, Nyva Vinnytsia, Metalurh Donetsk, Kryvbas Kryvyi Rih, Oleksandriya 1992-2002
- Serhiy Chuichenko – Vorskla Poltava, Metalist Kharkiv, Oleksandriya 1998, 2001-03
- Omar Berdiýew – Metalist Kharkiv 2003
- Didargylyç Urazow – Metalist Kharkiv 2003
- Nazar Baýramow – Vorskla Poltava 2002-04
- Rasim Kerimov – Vorskla Poltava 2002-04
- Guwançmuhammet Öwekow – Arsenal Kyiv, Vorskla Poltava, Zorya Luhansk, Kharkiv (2001-2004, 2006-2008)

== Uganda ==
- Melvyn Lorenzen – Karpaty Lviv – 2019

== United States ==
- Dema Kovalenko – Metalurh Zaporizhzhia – 2006
- Eugene Starikov – Chornomorets Odesa – 2015–16

== Uruguay ==
- Facundo Batista – Polissya Zhytomyr – 2024–25
- Alejandro Mello – Chornomorets Odesa – 2007–10
- Carlos de Pena – Dynamo Kyiv – 2019–22
- Sebastián Ribas – Karpaty Lviv – 2017
- Damián Rodríguez – Shakhtar Donetsk – 2002–03
- Sebastián Vázquez – Chornomorets Odesa – 2007–10

== Uzbekistan ==
- Sergey Andreev – Tavriya Simferopol – 1992–93
- Oleg Belyakov – Kryvbas Kryvyi Rih – 2002–03
- Vitaliy Denisov – Dnipro Dnipropetrovsk – 2006–13
- Sadriddin Ishmirzaev – Tavriya Simferopol – 1992–93
- Jafar Irismetov – Kryvbas Kryvyi Rih – 2003–04
- Anvar Jabbarov – Kryvbas Kryvyi Rih – 1992–93
- Aleksandr Khvostunov – Chornomorets Odesa, Zakarpattia Uzhhorod – 2002–05
- Gennadiy Sharipov – Zorya Luhansk – 1992–93
- Maksim Shatskikh – Dynamo Kyiv, Arsenal Kyiv, Chornomorets Odesa, Hoverla Uzhhorod – 1999–2008, 2010–15
- Sergey Smorodin – Chornomorets Odesa – 2017
- Sanzhar Tursunov – Vorskla Poltava 2013–16
- Ruslan Uzakov – Torpedo Zaporizhzhia, Shakhtar Donetsk – 1992–94

== Venezuela ==
- **Andrusw Araujo** – Kryvbas Kryvyi Rih, **Polissya Zhytomyr** – 2025–
- Jovanny Bolívar – Kolos Kovalivka – 2024–25
- Bryan Castillo – Oleksandriya – 2025–26
- **Sebastián Castillo** – **Kharkiv** – 2025–
- Maiken González – Kryvbas Kryvyi Rih – 2024–25
- Luifer Hernández – Polissya Zhytomyr – 2023–25
- Kevin Kelsy – Shakhtar Donetsk – 2022–24
- **Gleiker Mendoza** – Kryvbas Kryvyi Rih, **Shakhtar Donetsk** – 2024–
- **Carlos Paraco** – Kryvbas Kryvyi Rih, **Kharkiv** – 2025–
- Eric Ramírez – Dynamo Kyiv – 2021–23
- **Yackson Rivas** – **Kryvbas Kryvyi Rih** – 2026–
- Carlos Rojas – Kryvbas Kryvyi Rih – 2025–26

== Zambia ==
- Shemmy Mayembe – Mynai – 2020–21

== Zimbabwe ==
- Henry Mutambikwa – Karpaty Lviv – 2001–02
- Musawengosi Mguni – Metalurh Donetsk – 2009–14

== See also ==
- Foreign footballers in Vyscha Liha listed by club

== External sources ==
- (in Ukrainian) Career stats by FFU
- (in Russian) List of players in Premier-Liha
- (in English) Career history at National Football Teams

== Notes ==
1. Born in Angola
2. Born in Armenia (then part of the Soviet Union)
3. Born in Austria
4. Born in Belarus (then part of the Soviet Union)
5. Born in Bosnia and Herzegovina (then part of SFR Yugoslavia)
6. Born in Brazil
7. Born in Croatia (then part of SFR Yugoslavia)
8. Born in Croatia
9. Born in the Democratic Republic of the Congo (then Zaire)
10. Born in Dominica
11. Born in England
12. Born in France
13. Born in Georgia (then part of the Soviet Union)
14. Born in Germany
15. Born in Germany (then part of West Germany)
16. Born in Ghana
17. Born in Greece
18. Born in Guinea-Bissau
19. Born in Israel
20. Born in Ivory Coast
21. Born in Kosovo (then part of SFR Yugoslavia)
22. Born in Kosovo (then part of FR Yugoslavia)
23. Born in Kosovo (then under United Nations administration)
24. Born in Luxembourg
25. Born in Moldova
26. Born in the Netherlands
27. Born in North Macedonia (then part of SFR Yugoslavia)
28. Born in North Macedonia
29. Born in Portugal
30. Born in Romania
31. Born in Russia (then part of the Soviet Union)
32. Born in Senegal
33. Born in Serbia (then part of SFR Yugoslavia)
34. Born in Sierra Leone
35. Born in Somalia
36. Born in Ukraine (then part of the Soviet Union)
37. Born in Ukraine
38. Born in the United States
39. Born in Zimbabwe
40. Capped for the Benin national football B team
41. Capped for the Brazil national under-18 football team
42. Capped for the Brazil national under-20 football team
43. Capped for the France national under-17 football team
44. Capped for the France national under-18 football team
45. Capped for the France national under-19 football team
46. Capped for the France national under-20 football team
47. Capped for the France national under-21 football team
48. Capped for the Germany national under-17 football team
49. Capped for the Germany national under-18 football team
50. Capped for the Germany national under-19 football team
51. Capped for the Ghana national under-17 football team
52. Capped for the Kosovo national under-19 football team
53. Capped for the Kosovo national football team
54. Capped for the Moldova national under-21 football team
55. Capped for the Netherlands national under-16 football team
56. Capped for the Netherlands national under-17 football team
57. Capped for the Netherlands national under-18 football team
58. Capped for the Netherlands national under-19 football team
59. Capped for the Portugal national under-18 football team
60. Capped for the Portugal national under-19 football team
61. Capped for the Portugal national under-20 football team
62. Capped for the Portugal national under-21 football team
63. Capped for the Serbia and Montenegro national under-19 football team
64. Capped for the Tunisia national under-20 football team
65. Capped for the Tunisia national under-21 football team
66. Capped for the Ukraine national under-15 football team
67. Capped for the Ukraine national under-16 football team
68. Capped for the Ukraine national under-17 football team
69. Capped for the Ukraine national under-18 football team
70. Capped for the Ukraine national under-19 football team
71. Capped for the Ukraine national under-20 football team
72. Capped for the Ukraine national under-21 football team
73. Capped for the Ukraine national football team
