= Aleksei Volovik =

Russian football player (born 1992)

Personal information
- Full name: Aleksei Olegovich Volovik
- Date of birth: 27 April 1992 (age 34)
- Place of birth: Tambov, Russia
- Height: 1.89 m (6 ft 2 1/2 in)
- Positions: Defender; midfielder

Senior career*
Years	Team	Apps	(Gls)
2011–2012	Akademiya Futbola Tambov Oblast	26	(1)
2012–2013	Spartak Tambov	25	(0)
2013	Akademiya Futbola Tambov Oblast	12	(2)
2014	Pritambovye Tambov	22	(5)
2015–2017	Atom Novovoronezh	26	(1)
2017–2018	Nosta Novotroitsk	18	(2)
2019	Rubin Yalta	9	(0)
2020	Volna Pinsk	22	(2)
2021	Sputnik Rechitsa	9	(0)
2021	Znamya Truda Orekhovo-Zuyevo	12	(1)
2022–2023	Spartak Tambov	26	(0)
- * Club domestic league appearances and goals

Aleksei Olegovich Volovik (Russian: Алексей Олегович Воловик; born 27 April 1992) is a Russian former football player.

== Club career ==
He made his debut in the Russian Second Division for FC Spartak Tambov on 17 April 2012 in a game against FC Sokol Saratov.
