= Yuri Garin =

Russian footballer

Personal information
- Full name: Yuri Aleksandrovich Garin
- Date of birth: 9 August 1958 (age 68)
- Place of birth: Borisoglebsk, Russian SFSR
- Height: 1.85 m (6 ft 1 in)
- Position: Defender

Youth career
- Trud Voronezh

Senior career*
Years	Team	Apps	(Gls)
1980–1982	FC Sokhibkor Khalkabad	43	(0)
1986	FC Atom Novovoronezh	31	(3)
1988–1991	FC Dynamo Bryansk	127	(30)
1992	FC APK Azov	18	(2)
1993	FC Krylia Sovetov Samara	20	(0)
1994–1995	FC Kuban Krasnodar	30	(3)
1996–1997	FC Dynamo Bryansk	48	(2)

Managerial career
- 2008: FC Dynamo Bryansk (administrator)
- * Club domestic league appearances and goals

Yuri Aleksandrovich Garin (Russian: Юрий Александрович Гарин; born 9 August 1958) is a former Russian football player.
