= FC UC BEST =

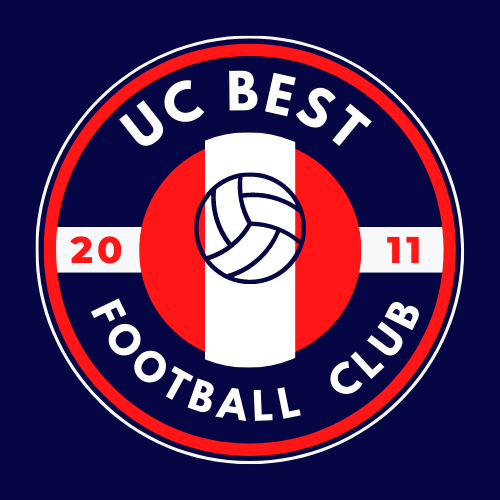
- Full name: Football Club UC BEST
- Nickname: FC UC BEST
- Founded: 4 August 2011
- Dissolved: 2023
- Ground: Amirani Stadium; Tbilisi
- Capacity: 5000
- League: n/a
Home colours	Away colours

FC UC BEST is a football club based in Tbilisi, Georgia Europe. The club was founded in the year of 2011. The football club is owned by a Nigerian/Georgian citizen Uchechukwu Uwakwe (Uche Uwakwe). The proprietor's aim of creating the club is to help to develop the talents and careers of upcoming stars. He also has it in mind to help to develop the game of football in Georgia from the grassroots to the highest level of football. The proprietor has been into football as a player for a very long period in so many countries as a professional. But right now he thinks on how much to help many careers to come to the highest level of the game. He also features in some pre-season matches where he has recorded some brilliant and beautiful goals. Football club FC UC BEST is in the second division of the Georgian League, which is organized by Georgian Football Federation (GFF). The team head coach Makho Makharadze (the formal Captain of Dinamo Batumi Football Club Georgia (The coach) declared to promote the team from second division to the first division by the end of the season. The team has played series of matches with rather good results.

The club home match games stadium is AMIRANI (capacity: 5000) in Tbilisi, Georgia_(country).

So far the club has played 7 consecutive games. The club was founded in 2011 and plays in the Georgian Second Division.

== Ownership ==
The football club is owned by a Nigerian/Georgian citizen Uchechukwu Uwakwe (Uche Uwakwe).

== Team squad ==
Note: Flags indicate national team as defined under FIFA eligibility rules; some limited exceptions apply. Players may hold more than one non-FIFA nationality.

No.	Pos.	Nation	Player
—	GK	GEO	Irakli Gedenidze
—	GK	GEO	Kvartskava Edika

No.	Pos.	Nation	Player
—	FW		

== Stadium ==
The club home match games stadium is the 5000 capacity Amirani Stadium in Tbilisi.
