= Emil Dăncuș =

Romanian footballer

Personal information
- Full name: Emil Gavril Dăncuș
- Date of birth: 4 October 1974 (age 52)
- Place of birth: Sighetu Marmației, Romania
- Height: 1.87 m (6 ft 2 in)
- Position: Midfielder

Senior career*
Years	Team	Apps	(Gls)
1994–1995	AS Sighet		
1995–1999	Gloria Bistrița	116	(4)
1999–2001	Astra Ploieşti	45	(0)
2001–2002	Gloria Bistrița	7	(0)
2002–2003	Astra Ploieşti	17	(0)
2003–2004	Stal Alchevsk	22	(1)
2004	Gloria Bistrița	8	(0)
2005	Gaz Metan Mediaș	5	(0)
Total		220	(5)
- * Club domestic league appearances and goals

Emil Dăncuș (born 4 October 1974) is a Romanian former professional footballer who played as a midfielder.
