= Florinel Mirea =

Romanian footballer (born 1974)

Personal information
- Full name: Florinel Cristi Mirea
- Date of birth: 13 July 1974 (age 52)
- Place of birth: Craiova, PR Romania
- Height: 1.78 m (5 ft 10 in)
- Position: Defender

Senior career*
Years	Team	Apps	(Gls)
1992–1995	FC Electroputere Craiova	32	(0)
1995–1997	CS Minerul Motru		
1998–2000	FC Extensiv Craiova		
2000	FC Zimbru Chișinău		
2000–2001	FC Alania Vladikavkaz	22	(0)
2002–2003	FC Universitatea Craiova		
2003–2006	FC Stal Alchevsk	54	(2)
- * Club domestic league appearances and goals

Florinel Cristi Mirea (born 13 July 1974 in Craiova) is a former Romanian football player.
