= FC Stal Alchevsk =

Stal Alchevsk
- Full name: FC Stal Alchevsk
- Founded: 1983
- Dissolved: 2015
- Ground: Stal Alchevsk Stadium
- Capacity: 9,200
- Chairman: (Ukraine) Volodymyr Polubatko
- League: Ukrainian First League
- 2013–14: 3rd
Home colours	Away colours

FC Stal Alchevsk was a Ukrainian professional football team of the Ukrainian First League that is based in Alchevsk. In the 2012–13 season the club won promotion to the Ukrainian Premier League, but the club refused this promotion "for the sake of the fans". In 2015, Stal withdrew from all Ukrainian competitions due to the escalating conflict in Eastern Ukraine.

After adopting its name Stal, the club became a phoenix club of previously existed Stal (Voroshylovsk and Komunarsk, both names of Alchevsk during the Soviet period). It is commonly being confused with another football club from Alchevsk – Kommunarets which was dissolved in 1989, six years after establishing of Stroitel Kommunarsk.

== History ==
- First club
  - Stal Voroshylovsk
  - Metalurh Komunarsk
  - Komunarets Komunarsk
- Second club
  - Budivelnyk Komunarsk
  - Stal Alchevsk

=== Previous club ===
The club is named after the former city's sports society Stal that was established in Alchevsk (at that time Voroshylovsk) in 1935.

=== Second club ===
The contemporary club traces its history to 1983 when in Komunarsk (name of Alchevsk in 1961–1991) was founded new amateur football club Budivelnyk (Stroitel) along with already existing professional club Komunarets. The club started out in the championship of Luhansk Oblast. During that time the city top club was Kommunarets which was in synchronization with the former name of Alchevsk – Kommunarsk in the honor of the Paris Commune. Its communist revolutionary spirit can be noticed on the contemporary club's logo. With the fall of the Soviet Union Kommunarets was relegated from the Soviet championship in 1988 and disappeared, while Budivelnyk led by Anatoliy Volobuyev became sponsored by the city's metallurgic factory and were introduced to the Ukrainian SSR championship among physical culture clubs (KFK) for the 1989 season. In 1990 the club placed second in the final tournament and was promoted to the Soviet competitions (1991 Soviet Second League B).

Stal joined the Ukrainian Premier League in 2000–2001 for its tenth season. They finished in the next-to-last place and were relegated back to the Persha Liha where they remained until the 2005–2006 season, for which they and FC Kharkiv achieved promotion back to the Ukrainian Premier League. In 2006–2007 season Stal were relegated back to the Persha Liha, where they played till the end of the 2012–13 season in which they won promotion to the Ukrainian Premier League. But the club refused this promotion because of its Stal Stadium did not meet the requirements of the highest Ukrainian division and the club did not want to play in another stadium because it did see "no point in holding matches in another stadium as most fans of Stal won’t see them".

In 2015, Stal withdrew from all competitions due to the escalating conflict in Eastern Ukraine, with ongoing battles and artillery fired near the playing fields, the club decided it was impossible to continue operating in such conditions.

== Club name ==
"Stal" is a popular name in Soviet culture and stands for "steel" (in English). The name was chosen as the pride for the heavily industrialized region of the country.

=== Football kits and sponsors ===
Years	Football kit	Shirt sponsor
2005–2007	umbro	–

== Head coaches ==
- (Ukraine) Anatoliy Volobuyev (1989–00)
- (Ukraine) Anatoliy Konkov (2001)
- (Ukraine) Anatoliy Volobuyev (2002 – May 2006)
- (Ukraine) Mykola Pavlov (May 2006 – Jun 2006)
- (Netherlands) Ton Caanen (Jul 2006 – Jun 2007)
- (Ukraine) Hennadiy Batkayev (Jun 2007 – Jan 2008)
- (Ukraine) Oleh Smolyaninov (Jan 2008 – Sep 2008)
- (Ukraine) Vadym Plotnykov (Sep 2008 – 5 Nov 2009)
- (Ukraine) Anatoliy Volobuyev (5 Nov 2009 – 2013)
- (Ukraine) Vadym Plotnykov (2013–2014)

== Honors ==
- Ukrainian First League
  - Champions (1): 2004–05
  - Runners-up (2): 1999–2000, 2012–13

== Notable players ==
- (Brazil) Alan
- (Romania) Cătălin Anghel
- (Curaçao) Sendley Bito
- (Romania) Daniel Chiriță
- (Romania) Emil Dăncuș
- (Armenia) Hovhannes Demirchyan
- (France) Serigne Diop
- (Ukraine) Yuriy Dudnyk
- (Cameroon) Paul Essola
- (Brazil) Gil Bala
- (Argentina) Rubén Gómez
- (North Macedonia) Boban Grnčarov
- (Serbia) Marko Grubelić
- (Armenia) Ara Hakobyan
- (Ukraine) Oleksandr Koval
- (Romania) Bogdan Mara
- (Armenia) Yegishe Melikyan
- (Romania) Florinel Mirea
- (Cameroon) Colince Ngaha Poungoue
- (Republic of the Congo) Burnel Okana-Stazi
- (Nigeria) Samuel Okunowo
- (Romania) Florin Pârvu
- (Lithuania) Marius Skinderis
- (Ukraine) Andriy Smalko
- (Ukraine) Oleksandr Spivak
- (Bosnia and Herzegovina) Sergej Tica
- (Georgia (country)) Giorgi Tsimakuridze
- (Brazil) Paulo Vogt
- (Ukraine) Hennadiy Zubov

== League and cup history ==
Season	Div.	Pos.	Pl.	W	D	L	GS	GA	P	Domestic Cup	Europe	Notes
1992	2nd "A"	9	26	9	8	9	28	22	26	1/16 finals		
1992–93	2nd	10	42	16	10	16	40	37	42	1/64 finals		
1993–94	2nd	4	38	22	7	9	56	40	51	1/16 finals		
1994–95	2nd	9	42	19	5	18	69	50	62	1/8 finals		
1995–96	2nd	3	42	26	5	11	73	40	69	1/16 finals		
1996–97	2nd	6	46	23	9	14	76	43	78	1/32 finals 2nd stage		
1997–98	2nd	4	42	24	5	13	69	53	77	1/16 finals		
1998–99	2nd	9	38	16	7	15	55	52	55	1/16 finals		
1999–00	2nd	2	34	21	7	6	69	36	70	1/16 finals		Promoted
2000–01	1st	13	26	3	6	17	19	49	15	1/16 finals		Relegated
2001–02	2nd	6	34	14	8	12	42	34	50	1/8 finals		
2002–03	2nd	6	34	14	10	10	36	33	52	1/8 finals		
2003–04	2nd	5	34	17	7	10	69	27	58	1/4 finals		
2004–05	2nd	1	34	22	11	1	69	24	77	1/8 finals		Promoted
2005–06	1st	11	30	9	9	12	26	39	36	1/8 finals		
2006–07	1st	16	30	5	6	19	22	38	21	1/8 finals		Relegated
2007–08	2nd	7	38	15	13	10	52	44	69	1/8 finals		
2008–09	2nd	10	32	11	10	11	33	39	43	1/4 finals		
2009–10	2nd	3	34	19	8	7	55	35	69	1/8 finals		
2010–11	2nd	3	34	18	8	8	55	33	62	1/4 finals		
2011–12	2nd	7	34	14	8	12	51	50	50	1/32 finals		
2012–13	2nd	2	34	20	6	8	58	35	69	1/16 finals		Refused promoted
2013–14	2nd	3	30	16	3	11	41	33	51	1/32 finals		
2014–15	2nd									Withdrew		
