= Yuri Sobol =

Russian footballer (born 1966)

Personal information
- Full name: Yuri Alekseyevich Sobol
- Date of birth: 20 March 1966 (age 60)
- Height: 1.76 m (5 ft 9 1/2 in)
- Position: Striker

Senior career*
Years	Team	Apps	(Gls)
1983–1984	FC Kuban Krasnodar	27	(1)
1985–1986	FC SKA Rostov-on-Don	24	(1)
1987–1991	FC Kuban Krasnodar	145	(23)
1991–1992	FC Samtredia	33	(17)
1992	Vorskla Poltava	1	(0)
1992	FC Kuban Krasnodar	11	(3)
1993–1994	FC Tekstilshchik Kamyshin	26	(3)
1994	FC Lada Togliatti	19	(4)
1994–1996	Vorskla Poltava	50	(24)
1997–1998	Kremin Kremenchuk	28	(2)
- * Club domestic league appearances and goals

Yuri Alekseyevich Sobol (Russian: Юрий Алексеевич Соболь; born March 20, 1966) is a former Russian professional footballer.

== Club career ==
He made his professional debut in the Soviet First League in 1983 for FC Kuban Krasnodar.
