= Vladimir Zinich =

Russian footballer

Personal information
- Full name: Vladimir Nikolayevich Zinich
- Date of birth: 27 September 1968 (age 58)
- Place of birth: Kirov Oblast, Russian SFSR
- Height: 1.80 m (5 ft 11 in)
- Position: Striker

Team information
- Current team: FC Atom Novovoronezh (manager)

Youth career
- DYuSSh-2 Shebekino

Senior career*
Years	Team	Apps	(Gls)
1986–1987	FC Salyut Belgorod	38	(3)
1988	PFC CSKA Moscow	4	(0)
1988	→ PFC CSKA-2 Moscow	8	(0)
1989–1990	SKA Odesa	57	(26)
1991	FC Chornomorets Odesa	13	(1)
1991–1992	SKA Odesa	7	(3)
1992–1993	Karpaty Krosno		
1993	FC Torpedo Zaporizhzhia	6	(1)
1994	SK Odesa	10	(4)
1994–1998	FC Fakel Voronezh	82	(37)
1999	FC Dynamo Semiluki		
2000	FC Zvezda Ostrogozhsk		
2000–2001	FC Energiya Talovaya		

Managerial career
- 2004: FC Salyut-Energia Belgorod (assistant)
- 2007: FC Zodiak-Oskol Stary Oskol
- 2007: FC Salyut-Energia Belgorod
- 2008: FC Salyut-Energia Belgorod
- 2009–2011: FC Metallurg-Oskol Stary Oskol
- 2012: FC Metallurg-Oskol Stary Oskol
- 2014–: FC Atom Novovoronezh
- * Club domestic league appearances and goals

Vladimir Nikolayevich Zinich (Russian: Владимир Николаевич Зинич; born 27 September 1968) is a Russian professional football coach and a former player. He is the manager of FC Atom Novovoronezh.

== Club career ==
As a player, he made his debut in the Soviet Second League in 1986 for FC Salyut Belgorod.
