= Sead Salahović =

Serbian footballer

Personal information
- Date of birth: 24 October 1977 (age 49)
- Place of birth: Prizren, SFR Yugoslavia
- Height: 1.81 m (5 ft 11 in)
- Position: Forward

Youth career
- 1985–1992: OFK Beograd
- 1992–1996: BSK Borča

Senior career*
Years	Team	Apps	(Gls)
1997–1998	Palilulac Beograd		
1998–1999	Zvezdara		
1999	Obilić	5	(2)
2000	Alania Vladikavkaz	1	(0)
2000–2002	Royal Antwerp	19	(5)
2002–2003	Zovko-Žepče	16	(9)
2003–2004	Belasica		
2004–2005	Kryvbas Kryvyi Rih	29	(6)
2005–2008	PKB Padinska Skela		
- * Club domestic league appearances and goals

Sead Salahović (Serbian Cyrillic: Сеад Салаховић, born 24 October 1977) is a Serbian former professional footballer.
