= Sergei Pravkin =

Russian footballer

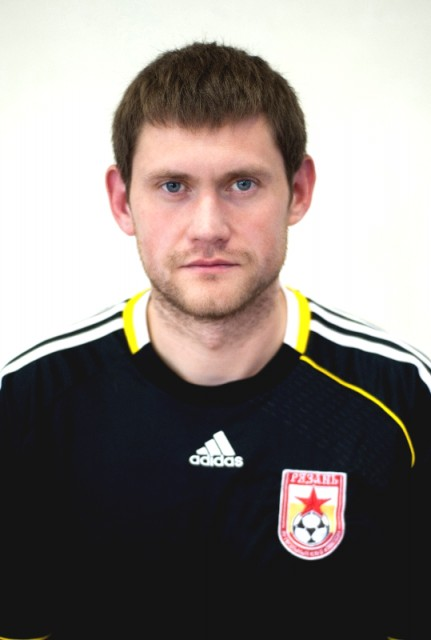

Personal information
- Full name: Sergei Nikolayevich Pravkin
- Date of birth: 20 January 1980 (age 46)
- Place of birth: Danilov, Russian SFSR
- Height: 1.92 m (6 ft 4 in)
- Position: Goalkeeper

Team information
- Current team: FC Ryazan (assistant coach)

Youth career
- DYuKFP 900 Ryazan
- SKA-Sizap Ryazan

Senior career*
| Years | Team | Apps | (Gls) |
| 1998 | FC Spartak Ryazan | 23 | (0) |
| 1998–2001 | FC Kryvbas-2 Kryvyi Rih | 24 | (0) |
| 2000–2001 | FC Kryvbas Kryvyi Rih | 14 | (0) |
| 2001 | FC Mashzavod Zarechny | | |
| 2002 | FC Tsement Oktyabrsky | | |
| 2003 | FC Ryazan-Agrokomplekt Ryazan | 33 | (0) |
| 2004 | FC Dynamo Stavropol | 28 | (0) |
| 2005–2006 | FC Salyut-Energia Belgorod | 32 | (0) |
| 2007–2009 | FC Shinnik Yaroslavl | 37 | (0) |
| 2010 | FC Baltika Kaliningrad | 16 | (0) |
| 2011–2014 | FC Zvezda Ryazan | 46 | (0) |
| 2014–2023 | FC Ryazan | 97 | (0) |

Managerial career
- 2024–: FC Ryazan (assistant)
- * Club domestic league appearances and goals

Sergei Nikolayevich Pravkin (Russian: Серге́й Николаевич Правкин; born 20 January 1980) is a Russian football coach and a former player who is an assistant coach with FC Ryazan.

== Club career ==
He made his Russian Premier League debut for FC Shinnik Yaroslavl on 29 March 2008 in a game against FC Luch-Energiya Vladivostok.

== Honours ==
- Russian Second Division Zone South best goalkeeper: 2004.
