= Valeri Tkachuk =

Russian footballer and coach

Personal information
- Full name: Valeri Andreyevich Tkachuk
- Date of birth: 18 September 1963 (age 63)
- Place of birth: Kaluga Oblast, Russian SFSR
- Height: 1.76 m (5 ft 9 1/2 in)
- Position: Midfielder

Youth career
- FC Kvant Obninsk

Senior career*
Years	Team	Apps	(Gls)
1981–1983	FC Lokomotiv Kaluga	50	(5)
1983–1987	FC Zarya Kaluga	137	(20)
1988–1991	FC Metalurh Zaporizhya	92	(7)
1991–1992	FUS de Rabat		
1992	FC Obninsk		
1992–1993	FC Torpedo Zaporizhia	10	(1)
1993–1994	FC Metalurh Zaporizhya	22	(1)
1995–1996	FC Turbostroitel Kaluga	23	(0)

Managerial career
- 1997–2003: FC Obninsk
- 2004: FC Lokomotiv Kaluga
- FC VILSI Kaluga
- * Club domestic league appearances and goals

Valeri Andreyevich Tkachuk (Russian: Валерий Андреевич Ткачук; born 18 September 1963) is a retired Russian professional footballer and football coach.

He was pupil of the Sports school of FC Kvant Obninsk, the first coach — Yuri Shuvanov.
