= Marko Grubelić =

Serbian footballer

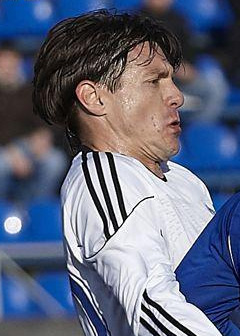

Personal information
- Date of birth: 23 September 1980 (age 46)
- Place of birth: Belgrade, SFR Yugoslavia
- Height: 1.80 m (5 ft 11 in)
- Position: Defender

Senior career*
Years	Team	Apps	(Gls)
1998–1999	Zemun	1	(0)
1999–2001	Milicionar	7	(0)
2001–2002	Radnički Obrenovac	27	(0)
2002–2006	Rad	72	(1)
2006–2008	Metalurh Donetsk	16	(0)
2006–2007	→ Stal Alchevsk (loan)	12	(0)
2009–2013	Bežanija	63	(0)
2010	→ Volgar Astrakhan (loan)	13	(0)
- * Club domestic league appearances and goals as of 12 May 2017

Marko Grubelić (Serbian Cyrillic: Марко Грубелић; born 23 September 1980) is a Serbian retired footballer.

== Career ==
Born in Belgrade, SR Serbia, he had previously played for Serbian clubs FK Zemun, FK Milicionar, FK Radnički Obrenovac and FK Rad, and Ukrainian clubs FC Metalurh Donetsk and FC Stal Alchevsk. During 2010 he played with Russian First Division club FC Volgar Astrakhan on loan. Grubelić retired from professional football in 2013, but due to his assistant role in Bežanija, he used to be a player-coach in the 2016–17 Serbian First League, but failed to play any official match.
