= Roman Yevmenyev =

Russian footballer

Personal information
- Full name: Roman Vladimirovich Yevmenyev
- Date of birth: 30 January 1979 (age 47)
- Height: 1.79 m (5 ft 10 in)
- Positions: Midfielder; defender

Senior career*
Years	Team	Apps	(Gls)
1996	FC Beshtau Lermontov	17	(0)
1997	FC Baltika Kaliningrad	0	(0)
1997	FC Salyut-YuKOS Belgorod	4	(0)
1998	FC Nart Cherkessk	0	(0)
1999	FC Beshtau Lermontov	13	(0)
1999	FC Arzamas	10	(0)
2000	FC Svetotekhnika Saransk	3	(0)
2001	FC Baltika Kaliningrad	0	(0)
2001	FC Balakovo	9	(0)
2002–2004	FC Zirka Kirovohrad	29	(1)
2004–2005	FC Zorya Luhansk	16	(0)
2005–2006	FC Nistru Otaci	11	(0)
2006	FC Angusht Nazran	21	(0)
2008	FC Khimik Dzerzhinsk	0	(0)
2008	FC Znamya Truda Orekhovo-Zuyevo	19	(2)
- * Club domestic league appearances and goals

Roman Vladimirovich Yevmenyev (Russian: Роман Владимирович Евменьев; born 30 January 1979) is a former Russian professional footballer.
