= Sergei Barkalov =

Russian footballer and coach

Personal information
- Full name: Sergei Nikolayevich Barkalov
- Date of birth: 1 March 1973 (age 53)
- Place of birth: Voronezh, Russian SFSR
- Height: 1.88 m (6 ft 2 in)
- Position: Goalkeeper

Team information
- Current team: FC Zenit Irkutsk (GK coach)

Youth career
- Voronezh

Senior career*
Years	Team	Apps	(Gls)
1990–1991	Kauchuk Sterlitamak	17	(0)
1992–1994	Artania Ochakiv	71	(0)
1994–1996	Kremin Kremenchuk	8	(0)
1996–1997	Ataka-Aura Minsk	9	(0)
1998–1999	Lokomotiv Liski	1	(0)
1999	Zenit Penza	14	(0)
2000–2006	Zvezda Irkutsk	139	(0)
2007–2008	Volga Ulyanovsk	41	(0)
2009	FSA Voronezh	11	(0)
2010–2014	Baikal Irkutsk	90	(0)
2015	Lokomotiv Liski	0	(0)

Managerial career
- 2017–: FC Zenit Irkutsk (GK coach)
- * Club domestic league appearances and goals

Sergei Nikolayevich Barkalov (Russian: Серге́й Николаевич Баркалов; born 1 March 1973) is a Russian professional football coach and a former player. He works as a goalkeepers coach with FC Zenit Irkutsk.
