= Uchechukwu Uwakwe =

Nigerian footballer (born 1979)

Personal information
- Date of birth: 3 July 1979 (age 47)
- Place of birth: Nigeria
- Positions: Midfielder; striker

Senior career*
Years	Team	Apps	(Gls)
1994–1995	Enyimba		
1995–1998	Étoile Filante du Togo		
1998–2000	Dinamo Batumi	4	(0)
2001–2002	Tavriya Simferopol	14	(1)
2003–2005	Ford United		
2005	Egersund	1	(0)
2006	Song Lam Nghe An		
- * Club domestic league appearances and goals

Uchechukwu Uwakwe (born 3 July 1979) is a Nigerian former professional footballer who played as a midfielder or striker.

== Career ==
Uwakwe started his career with Georgian side Dinamo (Batumi), becoming the first Black player to play in Georgia. Before the second half of 2001–02, Uwakwe signed for Tavriya in the Ukrainian top flight, where he made 16 appearances and scored 1 goal. In 2007, he signed for Norwegian fourth tier club Egersund. In 2011, Uwakwe founded and owned UC BEST, a team in Georgia.
