= Peter Mercado =

Ecuadorian footballer (born 1981)

Personal information
- Full name: Peter Taylor Mercado Nazareno
- Date of birth: 1 December 1981 (age 44)
- Place of birth: Ecuador
- Height: 1.84 m (6 ft 0 in)
- Positions: Defender; midfielder

Youth career
- Rocafuerte
- El Nacional

Senior career*
Years	Team	Apps	(Gls)
- Montenegro Fútbol Club
2003–2004	Vorskla Poltava	29	(0)
2003–2004	→ Vorskla-2 Poltava	2	(1)
2004	Kryvbas Kryvyi Rih	0	(0)
2005	Liga de Loja		
2006	Emelec		
2009	Técnico Universitario		
-2010	Universidad Católica (Ecuador)	7+	(0+)
2010	Guayaquil City		
2011	Atlético Audaz		(1)
2012	Ferroviarios		
2013	Mushuc Runa		
2015	Liga de Portoviejo		
2016	Deportivo Quito		
- * Club domestic league appearances and goals

Peter Taylor Mercado Nazareno (born 1 December 1981) is an Ecuadorian former footballer who is last known to have played as a defender or midfielder for Deportivo Quito.

== Career ==
Mercado started his career with Montenegro Fútbol Club in the Ecuadorian lower leagues, before joining Vorskla through Dragan Draskovic, the son of former Ecuador national team manager Dušan Drašković, where he became the first Ecuadorian to play in Ukraine and made 29 league appearances and scored 0 goals. After that, Mercado signed for Ukrainian club Kryvbas.
