= Sergej Tica =

Bosnian footballer

Personal information
- Date of birth: 13 August 1974 (age 52)
- Place of birth: SFR Yugoslavia
- Position: Midfielder

Senior career*
Years	Team	Apps	(Gls)
1994–1995	Borac Banja Luka		
1995–1996	Obilić	27	(2)
1996	Budućnost Valjevo	2	(0)
1997	OFK Beograd	2	(0)
1998	Milicionar	8	(1)
1999	Priština	3	(0)
1999	Paniliakos	2	(0)
2000	Čelik Zenica	11	(3)
2001	Stal Alchevsk	7	(0)
2001	Stal-2 Alchevsk	1	(0)
2001	Čelik Zenica	7	(1)
2002	Željezničar Sarajevo	18	(3)
2004	1. FC Schwalmstadt	12	(2)
2005	Eintracht Wald-Michelbach	2	(0)
2006	Čelik Zenica	3	(2)
Total		105	(14)
- * Club domestic league appearances and goals

Sergej Tica (Serbian Cyrillic: Сергеј Тица; born 13 August 1974) is a Bosnian former professional footballer who played as a midfielder.

== Career ==
Tica spent most of his early career in FR Yugoslavia with several clubs, including Obilić (1995–96), Budućnost Valjevo and OFK Beograd (1996–97), as well as Milicionar and Priština (1998–99). He later played in the top flights of Greece and Ukraine. Tica also spent time at Čelik Zenica (three spells) and Željezničar Sarajevo in the Premier League of Bosnia and Herzegovina.
