= Valeri Shevyrev =

Russian footballer

Personal information
- Full name: Valeri Vladimirovich Shevyrev
- Date of birth: 12 December 1974 (age 51)
- Height: 1.77 m (5 ft 9 1/2 in)
- Position: Midfielder

Senior career*
Years	Team	Apps	(Gls)
1992	FC Dynamo Izobilny	26	(0)
1993–1994	FC Viktor Zaporizhzhia	34	(5)
1995	FC Metalurh Zaporizhya	10	(0)
1995–2002	FC Dynamo Stavropol	272	(10)
2003–2005	FC Arsenal Tula	59	(6)
2006	FC Elista	17	(1)
2006	FC Chernomorets Novorossiysk	12	(0)
2007	FC Dynamo Stavropol	26	(1)
2008	FC Stavropol (D4)		
2009	FC Stavropol	23	(1)
- * Club domestic league appearances and goals

Valeri Vladimirovich Shevyrev (Russian: Валерий Владимирович Шевырев; born 12 December 1974) is a former Russian professional footballer.

== Club career ==
He played 6 seasons in the Russian Football National League for FC Dynamo Stavropol and FC Arsenal Tula.
