= Hovhannes Demirchyan =

Armenian footballer

Personal information
- Full name: Hovhannes Demirchyan
- Date of birth: 15 August 1975 (age 51)
- Place of birth: Armenia
- Position: Defender

Team information
- Current team: Shirak Gyumri

Senior career*
Years	Team	Apps	(Gls)
2000–2001	Shirak Gyumri		
2002	Spartak Yerevan		
2002	Stal Alchevsk		
2003–2004	FC Banants	24	(2)
2005	Kotayk Abovian	8	(0)
2007–2009	Shirak Gyumri	71	(1)

International career^{‡}
2000–2001	Armenia	6	(0)
- * Club domestic league appearances and goals as of June 2009 ‡ National team caps and goals as of November 2009

Hovhannes Demirchyan (born 15 August 1975) is a retired Armenian football player.

== National team statistics ==
Armenia national team
Year	Apps	Goals
2000	1	0
2001	5	0
Total	6	0
