= Oleg Mekhov =

Russian footballer

Personal information
- Full name: Oleg Ivanovich Mekhov
- Date of birth: 2 June 1966 (age 60)
- Height: 1.75 m (5 ft 9 in)
- Position: Forward

Senior career*
Years	Team	Apps	(Gls)
1983	FC Dynamo Moscow (reserves)		
1984	FC Shakhter Karagandy	25	(7)
1985	FC Dynamo Kashira	15	(2)
1988	FC Torpedo Kurgan	27	(6)
1989	FC Krasnaya Presnya Moscow	17	(2)
1989	FC Zauralye Kurgan	10	(0)
1990–1991	FC Asmaral Moscow	49	(15)
1991	FC Asmaral Kislovodsk	15	(3)
1992	FC Veres Rivne	39	(8)
1993	FC Anhalt Dessau	26	(4)
1994	FC Elektron Romny	2	(0)
1994–1995	Happy Valley AA		
1996	FC Roda Moscow	24	(7)
1997	FC Asmaral Moscow	19	(2)
- * Club domestic league appearances and goals

Oleg Ivanovich Mekhov (Russian: Олег Иванович Мехов; born 2 June 1966) is a former Russian professional footballer.
