= Patrick Iwosso =

Association football player

Personal information
- Date of birth: 5 February 1982 (age 44)
- Place of birth: Brazzaville, Republic of the Congo
- Height: 1.86 m (6 ft 1 in)
- Position: Defender

Senior career*
Years	Team	Apps	(Gls)
- Inter Club
- AmaZulu
–2006	Thouars		
2006–2007	Zorya Luhansk	7	(0)
- Vénissieux

International career
2001	Republic of the Congo	5	(0)
- * Club domestic league appearances and goals

Patrick Iwosso (born 5 February 1982) is a Republic of the Congo former footballer who is last known to have played as a defender for Vénissieux.

== Career ==
Iwosso started his career with Inter Club, before joining South African side AmaZulu. After that, he played for Thouars in the French fifth division.

In 2006, Iwosso signed for Ukrainian club Zorya where he made 7 league appearances and scored 0 goals and was known for communicating with the fans during games.
