= FC Atom Novovoronezh =

Russian football club

- Full name: Football Club Atom Novovoronezh
- Manager: Vladimir Zinich
- League: Russian Amateur Football League

FC Atom Novovoronezh (Russian: "Атом" Нововоронеж) is a Russian football team from Novovoronezh. Currently it plays in the Russian Amateur Football League. It played professionally in 1986 in the Soviet Second League. It was called FC Atom Novovoronezhsky before 1987.
