= 2016–17 FC Stal Kamianske season =

Stal Kamianske
2016-17 season
- President: Vardan Israelian
- Manager: Joop Gall (until 11 January 2017); Leonid Kuchuk (since 15 January 2017)
- Stadium: Meteor Stadium, Dnipro
- Ukrainian Premier League: 8th
- Ukrainian Cup: Round of 16 (1/8)
- Top goalscorer: League: Kwame Karikari (7); All: Kwame Karikari (7)
| Home colours | Away colours |

The 2016–17 season was 2nd consecutive season in the top Ukrainian football league for Stal Kamianske. Stal competed in Premier League and in the Ukrainian Cup.

== Players ==
=== Squad information ===
| Squad no. | Name | Nationality | Position | Date of birth (age) |
Goalkeepers
| 12 | Oleksandr Bandura | (Ukraine) | GK | 30 May 1986 (aged 31) |
| 64 | Herman Penkov | (Ukraine) | GK | 26 May 1994 (aged 23) |
| 79 | Yuriy Pankiv | (Ukraine) | GK | 3 November 1984 (aged 32) |
Defenders
| 2 | Leandro da Silva | (Brazil) | DF | 26 June 1985 (aged 32) |
| 4 | Anton Kravchenko | (Ukraine) | DF | 23 March 1991 (aged 26) |
| 7 | Serhiy Voronin | (Ukraine) | DF | 24 March 1987 (aged 30) |
| 13 | Miloš Stamenković | (Serbia) | DF | 1 June 1990 (aged 27) |
| 15 | Artem Shabanov | (Ukraine) | DF | 7 March 1992 (aged 25) |
| 20 | Pavlo Pashayev | (Azerbaijan) | DF | 4 January 1988 (aged 29) |
| 24 | Artur Danielyan ^{List B} | (Armenia) (Ukraine) | DF | 2 September 1998 (aged 18) |
| 32 | Mykola Ischenko | (Ukraine) | DF | 9 March 1983 (aged 34) |
| 36 | Yaroslav Strochylo ^{List B} | (Ukraine) | DF | 2 September 1998 (aged 18) |
Midfielders
| 3 | Oleksiy Dovhyi | (Ukraine) | MF | 2 November 1989 (aged 27) |
| 6 | Maksym Kalenchuk (Captain) | (Ukraine) | MF | 5 December 1989 (aged 27) |
| 8 | Gor Malakyan | (Armenia) | MF | 12 June 1994 (aged 23) |
| 9 | Edgar Malakyan | (Armenia) | MF | 22 September 1990 (aged 26) |
| 17 | Orest Kuzyk | (Ukraine) | MF | 17 May 1995 (aged 22) |
| 21 | Yuriy Klymchuk ^{List B} | (Ukraine) | MF | 5 May 1997 (aged 20) |
| 23 | Mykhaylo Meskhi ^{List B} | (Ukraine) | MF | 26 February 1997 (aged 20) |
| 34 | Mykola Pavlyuk ^{List B} | (Ukraine) | MF | 26 February 1997 (aged 20) |
| 88 | Maryan Mysyk ^{List B} | (Ukraine) | MF | 2 October 1996 (aged 20) |
| 91 | Roman Karasyuk | (Ukraine) | MF | 27 February 1991 (aged 26) |
| 94 | Maksym Zaderaka | (Ukraine) | MF | 7 September 1994 (aged 22) |
Forwards
| 10 | Boy Deul | (Curaçao) | FW | 30 August 1987 (aged 29) |
| 16 | Kwame Karikari | (Ghana) | FW | 21 January 1992 (aged 25) |
| 39 | Denys Vasin | (Ukraine) | FW | 4 March 1989 (aged 28) |
| 93 | Roman Debelko | (Ukraine) | FW | 8 August 1993 (aged 23) |

== Transfers ==
=== In ===
| Date | Pos. | Player | Age | Moving from | Type | Fee | Source |
Summer
| 19 June 2016 | DF | (Serbia) Miloš Stamenković | 26 | (Armenia) FC Shirak | Transfer | Undisclosed | |
| 24 June 2016 | DF | (Azerbaijan) Pavlo Pashayev | 28 | (Azerbaijan) Gabala | Transfer | Undisclosed | |
| 18 July 2016 | FW | (Netherlands) Sylvano Comvalius | 29 | (Germany) Hessen Kassel | Transfer | Undisclosed | |
| 18 July 2016 | FW | (Curaçao) Boy Deul | 29 | (Netherlands) FC Emmen | Transfer | Undisclosed | |
| 30 July 2016 | MF | (Ukraine) Oleksiy Dovhyi | 26 | (Ukraine) Vorskla Poltava | Transfer | Undisclosed | |
| 16 August 2016 | MF | (Aruba) Erixon Danso | 27 | (Netherlands) FC Emmen | Transfer | Undisclosed | |
| 31 August 2016 | FW | (Ghana) Kwame Karikari | 24 | (Norway) FK Haugesund | Transfer | Undisclosed | |
| 22 October 2016 | MF | (Ukraine) Orest Kuzyk | 21 | (Ukraine) Dynamo Kyiv | Transfer | Free | |
| 31 May 2016 | MF | (Ukraine) Anton Kotlyar | 23 | (Belarus) Naftan Novopolotsk | Loan return | | |
Winter
| 27 January 2017 | DF | (Ukraine) Artem Shabanov | 24 | (Ukraine) Volyn Lutsk | Transfer | Free | |
| 28 January 2017 | DF | (Brazil) Leandro da Silva | 31 | Unattached | Transfer | Free | |

=== Out ===
| Date | Pos. | Player | Age | Moving to | Type | Fee | Source |
Summer
| 30 May 2016 | DF | (Brazil) Gabriel Araújo | 24 | Unattached | Transfer | Free | |
| 30 May 2016 | DF | (Ukraine) Serhiy Pshenychnykh | 34 | Unattached | Transfer | Free | |
| 30 May 2016 | FW | (Curaçao) Guyon Fernandez | 30 | Unattached | Transfer | Free | |
| 22 June 2016 | MF | (Ukraine) Valeriy Kucherov | 23 | (Ukraine) Veres Rivne | Transfer | Undisclosed | |
| 30 June 2016 | DF | (Nigeria) Akeem Latifu | 26 | (Turkey) Alanyaspor | Transfer | Undisclosed | |
| 5 July 2016 | MF | (Ukraine) Anton Kotlyar | 23 | (Ukraine) Veres Rivne | Transfer | Undisclosed | |
| 21 July 2016 | DF | (Ukraine) Artem Baranovskyi | 26 | (Ukraine) Olimpik Donetsk | Transfer | Undisclosed | |
| 22 July 2016 | MF | (Serbia) Đorđe Lazić | 33 | (Greece) Xanthi | Transfer | Free | |
| 30 May 2016 | FW | (Ukraine) Yevhen Budnik | 26 | (Ukraine) Vorskla Poltava | Loan return | | |
| 13 July 2016 | MF | (Ukraine) Oleksandr Kozak | 22 | (Ukraine) Illichivets Mariupol | Loan | | |
Winter
| 27 December 2016 | MF | (Ukraine) Artem Yesaulov | 19 | (Azerbaijan) Shamkir FC | Transfer | Undisclosed | |
| 17 January 2017 | MF | (Aruba) Erixon Danso | 27 | (Norway) FK Jerv | Transfer | Free | |
| 10 March 2017 | FW | (Netherlands) Sylvano Comvalius | 29 | (Indonesia) Bali United | Transfer | Undisclosed | |

== Pre-season and friendlies ==
| 20 June 2016 Friendly | Vorskla Poltava (Ukraine) | 2–0 | (Ukraine) Stal Kamianske | Poltava |
| 17:30 EEST (UTC+03:00) | Khlyobas 21'; Budnik 57' | Report | | Stadium: Ltava Stadium |

| 29 June 2016 Friendly | Stal Kamianske (Ukraine) | 1–1 | (Hungary) Haladás | Unterschützen, Austria |
| 19:00 EEST (UTC+03:00) | Tandji 82' | Report | Williams 21' | Stadium: Stadium |

| 2 July 2016 Friendly | Stal Kamianske (Ukraine) | 0–0 | (Slovenia) NK Krško | Unterschützen, Austria |
| 18:30 EEST (UTC+03:00) | | Report | | Stadium: Stadium |

| 6 July 2016 Friendly | Stal Kamianske (Ukraine) | 1–1 | (Croatia) RNK Split | Unterschützen, Austria |
| 18:30 EEST (UTC+03:00) | Kalenchuk 44' | Report | Bakaj 81' | Stadium: Stadium; Referee: Thomas Paukowitz |

| 9 July 2016 Friendly | Stal Kamianske (Ukraine) | 0–0 | (Croatia) Inter Zaprešić | Unterschützen, Austria |
| 19:00 EEST (UTC+03:00) | | Report | | Stadium: Stadium; Referee: Poland Brondschmidt |

| 4 September 2016 Friendly | Stal Kamianske (Ukraine) | 1–2 | (Moldova) Milsami Orhei | Bucha |
| 17:00 EEST (UTC+03:00) | Hrachov 82' | Report | Zhigulyov 35'; Belous 84' | Stadium: Yuvileiny Stadium |

| 24 January 2017 Friendly | Stal Kamianske (Ukraine) | 2–0 | (Romania) Târgu Mureș | Antalya, Turkey |
| 16:00 EET (UTC+02:00) | Vasin 46+1' (pen.); Comvalius 54' | Report | | Stadium: Papillon Sports |

| 30 January 2017 Friendly | Stal Kamianske (Ukraine) | 1–1 | (Bulgaria) Botev Plovdiv | Antalya, Turkey |
| 16:30 EET (UTC+02:00) | Debelko 48' | Report | Vutov 15' | Stadium: Papillon Sports |

| 8 February 2017 Friendly | Stal Kamianske (Ukraine) | 2–0 | (Serbia) FK Voždovac | Belek, Turkey |
| 16:30 EET (UTC+02:00) | Shabanov 11'; Deul 57' | Report | | Stadium: Papillon Sports |

| 13 February 2017 Friendly | Stal Kamianske (Ukraine) | 0–0 | (Uzbekistan) Pakhtakor Tashkent | Belek, Turkey |
| 10:00 EET (UTC+02:00) | | Report | | Stadium: Papillon Sports |

| 13 February 2017 Friendly | Stal Kamianske (Ukraine) | 2–0 | (Kazakhstan) FC Aktobe | Belek, Turkey |
| 16:30 EET (UTC+02:00) | Vasin 7' da Silva 24' | Report | | Stadium: Papillon Sports |

| 17 February 2017 Friendly | Stal Kamianske (Ukraine) | 1–1 | (Ukraine) Cherkaskyi Dnipro | Belek, Turkey |
| 10:00 EET (UTC+02:00) | Edgar Malakyan 69' | Report | Storchous 43' | Stadium: Papillon Sports |

| 17 February 2017 Friendly | Stal Kamianske (Ukraine) | 2–2 | (Azerbaijan) Neftçi | Belek, Turkey |
| 15:30 EET (UTC+02:00) | Vasin 43'; Kravchenko 82' | Report | Hakimov 38' (pen.), 67' | Stadium: Papillon Sports |

== Competitions ==
=== Overall ===
| Competition | Started round | Final position | First match | Last match |
|---|---|---|---|---|
| Premier League | Matchday 1 | 8th | 23 July 2016 | 31 May 2017 |
| Cup | Round of 20 | Round of 16 | 21 September 2016 | 26 October 2016 |

Last updated:

=== Premier League ===
==== League table ====
| Pos | Team | Pld | W | D | L | GF | GA | GD | Pts | Qualification or relegation |
|---|---|---|---|---|---|---|---|---|---|---|
| 7 | Vorskla Poltava (Note: Vorskla Poltava was awarded the UPL Prestige Trophy for winning the consolation tournament.) | 32 | 11 | 9 | 12 | 32 | 32 | 0 | 42 | |
| 8 | Stal Kamianske | 32 | 11 | 8 | 13 | 27 | 31 | −4 | 41 | |
| 9 | Zirka Kropyvnytskyi | 32 | 9 | 7 | 16 | 29 | 43 | −14 | 34 | |
| 10 | Karpaty Lviv (Note: Karpaty Lviv was deducted six points according to a decision by FIFA Disciplinary Committee on 4 March 2016.) | 32 | 9 | 9 | 14 | 35 | 41 | −6 | 30 | |
| 11 | FC Dnipro (Note: FC Dnipro was deducted a total of 24 points (six points by the FIFA Disciplinary Committee for failing to clear their debts with former coach Juande Ramos and his assistants, six points by the Ukrainian Premier League for failing to comply with the decision of FIFA Disciplinary Committee to pay debts to former player Danilo Sousa Campos, three more points by the FFU Control and Disciplinary Committee for failing execute one of the decisions of the committee, and 9 more points on 9 June 2017, after the end of the tournament.). On the decision of FIFA, FFU enforced relegation of FC Dnipro straight to the Second League, skipping the First League. In a near future FFU will adopt a decision which team will be replacing Dnipro in the First League.) (R) | 32 | 8 | 13 | 11 | 31 | 40 | −9 | 13 | Relegation to Ukrainian Second League |
| 12 | Volyn Lutsk (Note: Volyn Lutsk was deducted six points on the request of Football Federation of Ukraine which received a letter from the FIFA Disciplinary Committee on 11 May 2017 urging to implement its decision of 15 March 2017, due to debts with former player Saša Stević.) (R) | 32 | 4 | 4 | 24 | 17 | 51 | −34 | 10 | Relegation to Ukrainian First League |

Source: UEFA, Ukrainian Premier League, Soccerway
Rules for classification: 1) Points; 2) Goal difference; 3) Goals scored; 4) Head-to-head points; 5) Head-to-head goal difference; 6) Head-to-head goals scored; 7) Draw.
(R) Relegated

==== Results summary ====
| Overall | | | | | | | | Home | | | | | | Away | | | | | |
| Pld | W | D | L | GF | GA | GD | Pts | W | D | L | GF | GA | GD | W | D | L | GF | GA | GD |
|---|---|---|---|---|---|---|---|---|---|---|---|---|---|---|---|---|---|---|---|
| 32 | 11 | 8 | 13 | 27 | 31 | −4 | 41 | 6 | 2 | 8 | 18 | 18 | 0 | 5 | 6 | 5 | 9 | 13 | −4 |

Last updated: 31 May 2017.
Source: Competitive matches

==== Results by round ====
| Round | 1 | 2 | 3 | 4 | 5 | 6 | 7 | 8 | 9 | 10 | 11 | 12 | 13 | 14 | 15 | 16 | 17 | 18 | 19 | 20 | 21 | 22 | 23 | 24 | 25 | 26 | 27 | 28 | 29 | 30 | 31 | 32 |
|---|---|---|---|---|---|---|---|---|---|---|---|---|---|---|---|---|---|---|---|---|---|---|---|---|---|---|---|---|---|---|---|---|
| Ground | A | H | A | H | A | A | H | A | H | A | H | H | A | H | A | H | H | A | H | A | H | A | A | H | A | H | A | H | A | H | A | H |
| Result | L | D | W | L | D | L | D | L | D | L | L | W | D | W | L | L | L | L | D | W | W | W | L | W | D | W | L | W | W | L | W | D |
| Position | 9 | 9 | 7 | 6 | 8 | 9 | 9 | 10 | 10 | 10 | 10 | 9 | 8 | 8 | 8 | 8 | 9 | 9 | 9 | 9 | 9 | 8 | 8 | 8 | 8 | 7 | 8 | 8 | 7 | 8 | 8 | 8 |

Updated to match(es) played on 31 May 2017. Source: Competitive matches
A = Away; H = Home; W = Win; D = Draw; L = Loss

==== Matches ====
| 23 July 2016 1 | Stal Kamianske | 0–3 | Karpaty Lviv | Dnipro |
| 17:00 EEST (UTC+03:00) | Karasyuk (yellow card) 29'; Pashayev (yellow card) 57'; Vasin (yellow card) 74'; Voronin (yellow card) 75' | Report | Novotryasov (yellow card) 8'; Kravets (yellow card) 26'; Chachua 41', (yellow card) 74'; Blanco Leschuk 47', 61' | Stadium: Meteor Stadium; Attendance: 1,050; Referee: Ivan Bondar |

| 31 July 2016 2 | Dnipro | 1–1 | Stal Kamianske | Dnipro |
| 17:00 EEST (UTC+03:00) | Kohut (yellow card) 58'; Bliznichenko 60'; Luchkevych (yellow card) 78' | Report | Ischenko (yellow card) 64'; Comvalius 79' | Stadium: Dnipro-Arena; Attendance: 8,861; Referee: Ihor Pashkal |

| 6 August 2016 3 | Stal Kamianske | 1–0 | Volyn Lutsk | Dnipro |
| 17:00 EEST (UTC+03:00) | Deul 12' | Report | Zaderetskyi (yellow card) 45'; Shabanov (yellow card) (yellow-red card) 65'; Shapoval (yellow card) 68'; Bohdanov (yellow card) 78' | Stadium: Meteor Stadium; Attendance: 700; Referee: Olexandr Holovkov |

| 14 August 2016 4 | Stal Kamianske | 1–2 | Dynamo Kyiv | Dnipro |
| 19:30 EEST (UTC+03:00) | Stamenković (yellow card) 19'; Ischenko 26'; Edgar Malakyan (yellow card) 54' (yellow-red card) 72'; Vasin (yellow card) 56'; Dovhyi (yellow card) 90+2' | Report | Harmash 79', (yellow card) 82'; Antunes 88'; Moraes (yellow card) 89' | Stadium: Meteor Stadium; Attendance: 1,350; Referee: Olexandr Derdo |

| 21 August 2016 5 | Vorskla Poltava | 0–0 | Stal Kamianske | Poltava |
| 19:30 EEST (UTC+03:00) | Dytyatev (yellow card) 44' | Report | | Stadium: Vorskla Stadium; Attendance: 2,500; Referee: Yuriy Hryso |

| 28 August 2016 6 | Stal Kamianske | 0–1 | Shakhtar Donetsk | Dnipro |
| 19:30 EEST (UTC+03:00) | Kalenchuk (yellow card) 59'; Stamenković (yellow card) 73'+ | Report | Dentinho (yellow card) 2'; Malyshev (yellow card) 58'; Ferreyra 78'; Fred (yellow card) 90'; Nem (yellow card) 90+4' | Stadium: Meteor Stadium; Attendance: 2,502; Referee: Yury Vaks |

| 10 September 2016 7 | Zorya Luhansk | 2–2 | Stal Kamianske | Zaporizhia |
| 17:00 EEST (UTC+03:00) | Sukhotskyi (yellow card) 23'; Ljubenović 80'; Karavayev 78'; Petryak (yellow card) 23' | Report | Karikari 16'; Voronin (yellow card) 26' (yellow-red card) 47'; Edgar Malakyan (yellow card) 50'; Vasin 55'; Pashayev (yellow card) 67'; Karasyuk (yellow card) 79'; Gor Malakyan (yellow card) 84'; Gor Malakyan (red card) 84'; Pankiv (yellow card) 90+1' | Stadium: Slavutych-Arena; Attendance: 1,200; Referee: Anatoliy Zhabchenko |

| 17 September 2016 8 | Stal Kamianske | 2–3 | Olimpik Donetsk | Dnipro |
| 14:00 EEST (UTC+03:00) | Stamenković (yellow card) 10'; Pashayev (yellow card) 58'; Comvalius (yellow card) 63', (goal) 90+3' (pen.); Karasyuk 70'; Kalenchuk (yellow card) 80' | Report | Postupalenko (yellow card) (yellow-red card) 6', (goal) 35'; Bohdanov 60'; Hryn 73'; Makharadze (yellow card) 90+2' | Stadium: Meteor Stadium; Attendance: 570; Referee: Mykola Balakin |

| 25 September 2016 9 | Zirka Kropyvnytskyi | 0–0 | Stal Kamianske | Kropyvnytskyi |
| 17:00 EEST (UTC+03:00) | Chychykov (yellow card) 40' | Report | Kravchenko (yellow card) 46'; Zaderaka (yellow card) 58'; Pashayev (yellow card) 66'; Karasyuk (yellow card) 90+1' | Stadium: Zirka Stadium; Referee: Ivan Bondar |

| 1 October 2016 10 | Stal Kamianske | 1–2 | Chornomorets Odesa | Dnipro |
| 17:00 EEST (UTC+03:00) | Karikari 29', (yellow card) 37'; Zaderaka (yellow card) 58' | Report | Khocholava (yellow card) 11'; Filimonov (yellow card) 28'; Korkishko 34', (yellow card) 36'; Khoblenko 40'; Tatarkov (yellow card) 83' | Stadium: Meteor Stadium; Attendance: 550; Referee: Serhiy Boyko |

| 16 October 2016 11 | FC Oleksandriya | 2–0 | Stal Kamianske | Oleksandriya |
| 14:00 EEST (UTC+03:00) | Starenkyi 55', (yellow card) 79'; Kulish 85' | Report | Kalenchuk (yellow card) 26'; Zaderaka (yellow card) 57'; Ischenko (yellow card) 76' | Stadium: CSC Nika; Attendance: 1,267; Referee: Yaroslav Kozyk |

| 22 October 2016 12 | Karpaty Lviv | 0–1 | Stal Kamianske | Lviv |
| 17:00 EEST (UTC+03:00) | Blanco Leschuk (yellow card) 45'; Kostevych (yellow card) 62'; Zubeyko (yellow card) 66'; Hrysyo (yellow card) 78'; Kravets (yellow card) 90+1'; Chumak (yellow card) 90+5' | Report | Kalenchuk 26'; Voronin (yellow card) 38'; Edgar Malakyan (yellow card) 40'; Ischenko (yellow card) 45' | Stadium: Arena Lviv; Attendance: 1,200; Referee: Mykola Balakin |

| 30 October 2016 13 | Stal Kamianske | 1–1 | Dnipro | Dnipro |
| 19:30 EET (UTC+02:00) | Comvalius 51' | Report | Vakulko 70' | Stadium: Meteor Stadium; Attendance: 1,700; Referee: Yuriy Hryso |

| 5 November 2016 14 | Volyn Lutsk | 0–1 | Stal Kamianske | Lutsk |
| 17:00 EET (UTC+02:00) | Romanyuk (red card) 52'; Khomchenko (yellow card) 55' | Report | Comvalius 22'; Mysyk (yellow card) 32'; Voronin (yellow card) 73' | Stadium: Avanhard Stadium; Attendance: 0 Referee: Olexandr Derdo |

| 19 November 2016 15 | Dynamo Kyiv | 2–1 | Stal Kamianske | Kyiv |
| 17:00 EEST (UTC+03:00) | Khacheridi 18'; Vida (yellow card) 33'; Makarenko 50'; Rybalka (yellow card) 55'; Harmash (yellow card) 68' | Report | Comvalius 56'; Mysyk (yellow card) 60' | Stadium: NSC Olimpiyskiy; Attendance: 4,186; Referee: Olexandr Holovkov |

| 26 November 2016 16 | Stal Kamianske | 0–1 | Vorskla Poltava | Dnipro |
| 14:00 EET (UTC+02:00) | Zaderaka (yellow card) 21' | Report | Bartulović (yellow card) 28'; Siminin (yellow card) 33'; Dytyatev (yellow card) 35'; Kobakhidze (yellow card) 60'; Chesnakov (yellow card) 69'; Odaryuk (yellow card) 88'; Rebenok 89' | Stadium: Meteor Stadium; Attendance: 700; Referee: Ivan Bondar |

| 3 December 2016 17 | Shakhtar Donetsk | 2–0 | Stal Kamianske | Lviv |
| 17:00 EET (UTC+02:00) | Marlos 31' (pen.); Eduardo (yellow card) 57'; Taison 79' | Report | Kalenchuk (yellow card) 21' | Stadium: Arena Lviv; Attendance: 641; Referee: Yuriy Hryso |

| 11 December 2016 18 | Stal Kamianske | 0–2 | Zorya Luhansk | Dnipro |
| 19:30 EET (UTC+02:00) | Pashayev (yellow card) 7' | Report | Chaykovskyi (yellow card) 34'; Hrechyshkin (yellow card) 36'; Karavayev 74'; Bonaventure 76' | Stadium: Meteor Stadium; Attendance: 150; Referee: Yuriy Mozharovsky |

| 25 February 2017 19 | Olimpik Donetsk | 0–0 | Stal Kamianske | Lviv |
| 14:00 EET (UTC+02:00) | Tsymbalyuk (yellow card) 70' | Report | Vasin (yellow card) 63'; Shabanov (yellow card) 81' | Stadium: Arena Lviv; Attendance: 167; Referee: Yaroslav Kozyk |

| 4 March 2017 20 | Stal Kamianske | 3–0 | Zirka Kropyvnytskyi | Dnipro |
| 19:30 EET (UTC+02:00) | Ischenko (yellow card) 17' da Silva (yellow card) 44'; Karasyuk 49'; Vasin 73' (pen.); Debelko 85' | Report | Kucherenko (yellow card) 32'; Nailson (yellow card) 80' | Stadium: Meteor Stadium; Attendance: 300; Referee: Kateryna Monzul |

| 11 March 2017 21 | Chornomorets Odesa | 0–1 | Stal Kamianske | Odesa |
| 14:00 EET (UTC+02:00) | Azatskyi (yellow card) 53'; Smirnov (yellow card) 54'; Korkishko (yellow card) 74'; Andriyevskyi (yellow card) 90+3' | Report | Vasin (yellow card) 20', (goal) 24'; Karasyuk (yellow card) 48' | Stadium: Chornomorets Stadium; Attendance: 3,863; Referee: Kostyantyn Trukhanov |

| 18 March 2017 22 | Stal Kamianske | 4–1 | FC Oleksandriya | Dnipro |
| 19:00 EET (UTC+02:00) | Karikari 40' (pen.), 48', 90'; Dovhyi (yellow card) 64'; Pankiv (yellow card) 73'; Deul 86' (pen.) | Report | Starenkyi 19'; Siminin (yellow card) 39' (yellow-red card) 85'; Bondarenko (yellow card) 45'; Basov (yellow card) 57'; Tsurikov (yellow card) 75'; Pryyomov (yellow card) 90' | Stadium: Meteor Stadium; Attendance: 730; Referee: Oleksandr Holovkov |

| 2 April 2017 23 | Karpaty Lviv | 2–0 | Stal Kamianske | Lviv |
| 14:00 EEST (UTC+03:00) | Hladkyi 19' (pen.), 44'; Hrysyo (yellow card) 45'; Miroshnichenko (yellow card) 61'; Dytyatev (yellow card) 66' | Report | Karasyuk (yellow card) 20'; Karikari (yellow card) 35'; Vasin (yellow card) 50' | Stadium: Arena Lviv; Attendance: 4,217; Referee: Anatoliy Abdula |

| 8 April 2017 24 | Stal Kamianske | 2–0 | Volyn Lutsk | Dnipro |
| 14:00 EEST (UTC+03:00) | Kalenchuk (yellow card) 83'; Karikari 87', 90+4' | Report | Memeshev (yellow card) 29'; Petrov (yellow card) 38'; Zaderetskyi (yellow card) 82' | Stadium: Meteor Stadium; Attendance: 350; Referee: Yehven Aranovsky |

| 15 April 2017 25 | Dnipro | 0–0 | Stal Kamianske | Dnipro |
| 17:00 EEST (UTC+03:00) | Vakulko (yellow card) 75'; Balanyuk (yellow card) 85' | Report | Pankiv (yellow card) 26'; Ischenko (yellow card) 68' | Stadium: Dnipro-Arena; Attendance: 3,007; Referee: Oleksandr Ivanov |

| 22 April 2017 26 | Stal Kamianske | 1–0 | Zirka Kropyvnytskyi | Dnipro |
| 14:00 EEST (UTC+03:00) | Karikari (yellow card) 45+2'; Shabanov (yellow card) 55'; Vasin (yellow card) 58'; Kalenchuk (yellow card) 60'; Edgar Malakyan (yellow card) 61'; Gor Malakyan (yellow card) 63'; Zaderaka (yellow card) 77'; Leandro 82' | Report | Pereyra (yellow card) 25'; Eseola (yellow card) 29' (yellow-red card) 70'; Zhukov (yellow card) 49'; Drachenko (yellow card) 51' | Stadium: Meteor Stadium; Attendance: 445; Referee: Ihor Paskhal |

| 29 April 2017 27 | Vorskla Poltava | 2–0 | Stal Kamianske | Poltava |
| 17:00 EEST (UTC+03:00) | Sharpar 30' (pen.); Rebenok 39'; Tkachuk (yellow card) 65' | Report | Pankiv (yellow card) 28'; Stamenković (yellow card) 66'; Kalenchuk (yellow card) 89' | Stadium: Vorskla Stadium; Attendance: 1,500; Referee: Ivan Bondar |

| 7 May 2017 28 | Stal Kamianske | 2–1 | Karpaty Lviv | Dnipro |
| 14:00 EEST (UTC+03:00) | Pashayev (yellow card) 20'; Debelko 69'; Vasin (yellow card) 86'; Karasyuk 88' | Report | Zubeyko (yellow card) 9'; Nesterov 12'; Filimonov (yellow card) 38'; Chachua (yellow card) 75' | Stadium: Meteor Stadium; Attendance: 942; Referee: Kateryna Monzul |

| 12 May 2017 29 | Volyn Lutsk | 0–1 | Stal Kamianske | Lutsk |
| 19:00 EEST (UTC+03:00) | Lohinov (yellow card) 24' (yellow-red card); Goropevšek (yellow card) 35'; Chepelyuk (yellow card) 71'; Romanyuk (yellow card) 87' | Report | Debelko 18'; Kalenchuk (yellow card) 43'; Shabanov (yellow card) 47'; Stamenković (yellow card) 60'; Ischenko (yellow card) 90+4' | Stadium: Avanhard Stadium; Attendance: 1,120; Referee: Ihor Paskhal |

| 20 May 2017 30 | Stal Kamianske | 0–1 | Dnipro | Dnipro |
| 17:00 EEST (UTC+03:00) | Stamenković (yellow card) 10'; Shabanov (yellow card) 54'; Klymchuk (yellow card) 86' | Report | Balanyuk 41'; Vlad (yellow card) 68' | Stadium: Meteor Stadium; Attendance: 1,500; Referee: Yevhen Aranovsky |

| 27 May 2017 31 | Zirka Kropyvnytskyi | 0–1 | Stal Kamianske | Kropyvnytskyi |
| 17:00 EEST (UTC+03:00) | Zbun (yellow card) 47'; Pereyra (yellow card) 90+2' | Report | Klymchuk (yellow card) 41'; Zaderaka (yellow card) 62'; Vasin 78'; Kalenchuk (yellow card) 82'; Stamenković (yellow card) 86' | Stadium: Zirka Stadium; Attendance: 2,124; Referee: Mykola Balakin |

| 31 May 2017 32 | Stal Kamianske | 0–0 | Vorskla Poltava | Dnipro |
| 17:00 EEST (UTC+03:00) | Karasyuk (yellow card) 42'; Kalenchuk (yellow card) 77'; Kravchenko (yellow card) 78' | Report | Sapay (yellow card) 39'; Perduta (yellow card) 70'; Dallku (yellow card) 75'; Shust (yellow card) 77'; Chesnakov (yellow card) 81' | Stadium: Meteor Stadium; Attendance: 420; Referee: Ihor Pashkal |

=== Ukrainian Cup ===
| 21 September 2016 Round of 20 (1/16) | Cherkaskyi Dnipro | 1–3 | Stal Kamianske | Cherkasy |
| 18:30 EEST (UTC+03:00) | Tarasenko 16'; Davydov (yellow card) 51'; Skepskyi (yellow card) 58' | Report | Kalenchuk (yellow card) 65', (goal) 75'; Kravchenko (yellow card) 67'; Karasyuk 80'; Voronin 90' | Stadium: Tsentralnyi Stadion; Attendance: 2,600; Referee: Serhiy Dankovskiy |

| 26 October 2016 Round of 16 (1/8) | Illichivets Mariupol | 1–1 (4–2 p) | Stal Kamianske | Mariupol |
| 17:00 EEST (UTC+03:00) | Kozhanov 51'; Sydorenko (yellow card) 63'; Nasonov (yellow card) 96' | Report | Danso 7'; Stamenković (yellow card) 18'; Gor Malakyan (yellow card) 99'; Vasin (yellow card) 113'; Voronin (yellow card) 116'; Karasyuk (yellow card) 120' | Stadium: Illichivets Stadium; Attendance: 900; Referee: Serhiy Berezka |
| | Penalties |
| | Lebedenko (penalty missed); Vakulenko (penalty scored); Koltsov (penalty scored); Kisil (penalty scored); Myshnyov (penalty scored) | | Voronin (penalty scored); Ischenko (penalty missed); Pashayev (penalty missed); Karikari (penalty scored) |

== Statistics ==
=== Appearances and goals ===
| No. | Pos | Nat | Player | Total | | Premier League | | Cup | |
| No. | Pos | Nat | Player | Apps | Goals | Apps | Goals | Apps | Goals |
Goalkeepers
| 12 | GK | (Ukraine) UKR | Oleksandr Bandura | 6 | 0 | 4 | 0 | 2 | 0 |
| 79 | GK | (Ukraine) UKR | Yuriy Pankiv | 28 | 0 | 28 | 0 | 0 | 0 |
Defenders
| 2 | DF | (Brazil) BRA | Leandro da Silva | 14 | 1 | 14 | 1 | 0 | 0 |
| 4 | DF | (Ukraine) UKR | Anton Kravchenko | 14 | 0 | 8+5 | 0 | 1 | 0 |
| 7 | DF | (Ukraine) UKR | Serhiy Voronin | 16 | 1 | 14 | 0 | 2 | 1 |
| 13 | DF | (Serbia) SRB | Miloš Stamenković | 33 | 0 | 27+4 | 0 | 2 | 0 |
| 15 | DF | (Ukraine) UKR | Artem Shabanov | 13 | 0 | 13 | 0 | 0 | 0 |
| 20 | DF | (Azerbaijan) AZE | Pavlo Pashayev | 31 | 0 | 28+1 | 0 | 2 | 0 |
| 32 | DF | (Ukraine) UKR | Mykola Ischenko | 27 | 1 | 24+2 | 1 | 1 | 0 |
Midfielders
| 3 | MF | (Ukraine) UKR | Oleksiy Dovhyi | 6 | 0 | 4+2 | 0 | 0 | 0 |
| 6 | MF | (Ukraine) UKR | Maksym Kalenchuk | 31 | 2 | 28+1 | 1 | 2 | 1 |
| 8 | MF | (Armenia) ARM | Gor Malakyan | 20 | 0 | 13+6 | 0 | 1 | 0 |
| 9 | MF | (Armenia) ARM | Edgar Malakyan | 27 | 0 | 21+5 | 0 | 1 | 0 |
| 17 | MF | (Ukraine) UKR | Orest Kuzyk | 6 | 0 | 2+3 | 0 | 0+1 | 0 |
| 21 | MF | (Ukraine) UKR | Yuriy Klymchuk | 5 | 0 | 2+3 | 0 | 0 | 0 |
| 23 | MF | (Ukraine) UKR | Mykhaylo Meskhi | 1 | 0 | 0+1 | 0 | 0 | 0 |
| 88 | MF | (Ukraine) UKR | Maryan Mysyk | 17 | 0 | 11+5 | 0 | 0+1 | 0 |
| 91 | MF | (Ukraine) UKR | Roman Karasyuk | 32 | 4 | 26+4 | 3 | 1+1 | 1 |
| 94 | MF | (Ukraine) UKR | Maksym Zaderaka | 23 | 0 | 16+6 | 0 | 1 | 0 |
Forwards
| 10 | FW | (Curaçao) CUW | Boy Deul | 18 | 2 | 10+8 | 2 | 0 | 0 |
| 16 | FW | (Ghana) GHA | Kwame Karikari | 28 | 7 | 17+9 | 7 | 1+1 | 0 |
| 39 | FW | (Ukraine) UKR | Denys Vasin | 27 | 4 | 18+7 | 4 | 2 | 0 |
| 93 | FW | (Ukraine) UKR | Roman Debelko | 20 | 3 | 8+11 | 3 | 0+1 | 0 |
Players transferred out during the season
| 11 | MF | (Aruba) ARU | Erixon Danso | 10 | 1 | 3+5 | 0 | 2 | 1 |
| 99 | FW | (Netherlands) NED | Sylvano Comvalius | 19 | 5 | 12+5 | 5 | 1+1 | 0 |

Source: Competitions

Last updated: 31 May 2017

=== Goalscorers ===
| Rank | No. | Pos | Nat | Name | Premier League | Cup | Total |
|---|---|---|---|---|---|---|---|
| 1 | 16 | FW | (Ghana) | Kwame Karikari | 7 | 0 | 7 |
| 2 | 99 | FW | (Netherlands) | Sylvano Comvalius | 5 | 0 | 5 |
| 3 | 91 | MF | (Ukraine) | Roman Karasyuk | 3 | 1 | 4 |
| 3 | 39 | FW | (Ukraine) | Denys Vasin | 4 | 0 | 4 |
| 5 | 93 | FW | (Ukraine) | Roman Debelko | 3 | 0 | 3 |
| 6 | 6 | MF | (Ukraine) | Maksym Kalenchuk | 1 | 1 | 2 |
| 6 | 10 | FW | (Curaçao) | Boy Deul | 2 | 0 | 2 |
| 8 | 2 | DF | (Brazil) | Leandro da Silva | 1 | 0 | 1 |
| 8 | 7 | DF | (Ukraine) | Serhiy Voronin | 0 | 1 | 1 |
| 8 | 11 | MF | (Aruba) | Erixon Danso | 0 | 1 | 1 |
| 8 | 32 | DF | (Ukraine) | Mykola Ischenko | 1 | 0 | 1 |

Last updated: 27 May 2017

=== Clean sheets ===
| Rank | No. | Pos | Nat | Name | Premier League | Cup | Total |
|---|---|---|---|---|---|---|---|
| 1 | 79 | GK | (Ukraine) | Yuriy Pankiv | 11 | 0 | 11 |
| 2 | 12 | GK | (Ukraine) | Oleksandr Bandura | 4 | 0 | 4 |

Last updated: 31 May 2017

=== Disciplinary record ===
| No. | Pos | Nat | Player | Premier League | | | Cup | | | Total | | |
| No. | Pos | Nat | Player | Booked | (yellow card) (yellow-red card) | Sent off (straight red) | Booked | (yellow card) (yellow-red card) | Sent off (straight red) | Booked | (yellow card) (yellow-red card) | Sent off (straight red) |
| 2 | DF | (Brazil) | Leandro da Silva | 1 | 0 | 0 | 0 | 0 | 0 | 1 | 0 | 0 |
| 3 | MF | (Ukraine) | Oleksiy Dovhyi | 2 | 0 | 0 | 0 | 0 | 0 | 2 | 0 | 0 |
| 4 | DF | (Ukraine) | Anton Kravchenko | 2 | 0 | 0 | 1 | 0 | 0 | 3 | 0 | 0 |
| 6 | MF | (Ukraine) | Maksym Kalenchuk | 10 | 0 | 0 | 1 | 0 | 0 | 11 | 0 | 0 |
| 7 | DF | (Ukraine) | Serhiy Voronin | 3 | 1 | 0 | 1 | 0 | 0 | 4 | 1 | 0 |
| 8 | MF | (Armenia) | Gor Malakyan | 2 | 0 | 1 | 1 | 0 | 0 | 3 | 0 | 1 |
| 9 | MF | (Armenia) | Edgar Malakyan | 3 | 1 | 0 | 0 | 0 | 0 | 3 | 1 | 0 |
| 13 | DF | (Serbia) | Miloš Stamenković | 7 | 0 | 0 | 1 | 0 | 0 | 8 | 0 | 0 |
| 15 | DF | (Ukraine) | Artem Shabanov | 4 | 0 | 0 | 0 | 0 | 0 | 4 | 0 | 0 |
| 16 | FW | (Ghana) | Kwame Karikari | 3 | 0 | 0 | 0 | 0 | 0 | 3 | 0 | 0 |
| 20 | DF | (Azerbaijan) | Pavlo Pashayev | 6 | 0 | 0 | 0 | 0 | 0 | 6 | 0 | 0 |
| 21 | MF | (Ukraine) | Yuriy Klymchuk | 2 | 0 | 0 | 0 | 0 | 0 | 2 | 0 | 0 |
| 32 | DF | (Ukraine) | Mykola Ischenko | 6 | 0 | 0 | 0 | 0 | 0 | 6 | 0 | 0 |
| 39 | FW | (Ukraine) | Denys Vasin | 7 | 0 | 0 | 1 | 0 | 0 | 8 | 0 | 0 |
| 79 | GK | (Ukraine) | Yuriy Pankiv | 4 | 0 | 0 | 0 | 0 | 0 | 4 | 0 | 0 |
| 88 | MF | (Ukraine) | Maryan Mysyk | 2 | 0 | 0 | 0 | 0 | 0 | 2 | 0 | 0 |
| 91 | MF | (Ukraine) | Roman Karasyuk | 6 | 0 | 0 | 1 | 0 | 0 | 7 | 0 | 0 |
| 94 | MF | (Ukraine) | Maksym Zaderaka | 6 | 0 | 0 | 0 | 0 | 0 | 6 | 0 | 0 |
| 99 | FW | (Netherlands) | Sylvano Comvalius | 1 | 0 | 0 | 0 | 0 | 0 | 1 | 0 | 0 |

Last updated: 31 May 2017
