= 2016–17 Ukrainian Cup =

Tournament details
- Country: Ukraine
- Dates: 20 July 2016 – 17 May 2017; 20 July 2016 – 10 August 2016 (preliminary rounds); 21 September 2016 – 17 May 2017 (main event)
- Teams: 45

Final positions
- Champions: Shakhtar Donetsk (11th title)
- Runners-up: Dynamo Kyiv
- Semifinalists: FC Dnipro; MFC Mykolaiv
- UEFA Europa League: none (Note: both finalists qualified for the UEFA Champions League)

Tournament statistics
- Matches played: 43
- Goals scored: 93 (2.16 per match)

The 2016–17 Ukrainian Cup was the 26th annual season of Ukraine's football knockout competition. The decision on a schedule of competitions for clubs from the First and Second League in composition was confirmed by the Central Council of the Professional Football League of Ukraine and the competition held from 20 July 2016 to 17 May 2017.

The defending champions were Ukrainian Premier League side Shakhtar Donetsk, who beat Zorya Luhansk 2–0 in the previous final. They retained the trophy after beating Dynamo Kyiv 1–0 in the final as part of the season's main feature game.

== Team allocation ==
The competition included all professional first teams from the Premier League (12/12 teams of the league), First League (18/18), Second League (13/17) and two best teams from the previous year's Amateur Cup. Beside two reserve teams from the Second League that did not compete, there were two more other clubs from the Second League that were not included in the draw as well.

=== Distribution ===
First preliminary round (10 teams)	8 entrants from the Second League; 2 entrants from the Amateur Cup	
Second preliminary round (28 teams)	18 entrants from the First League; 5 entrants from the Second League	5 winners from the First preliminary round
Round of 32 (20 teams)	6 entrants from the Premier League	14 winners from the Second preliminary round
Round of 16 (16 teams)	6 entrants from the Premier League	10 winners from the Round 1

=== Teams ===
Enter in First Round		Enter in Second Round		Enter in Round of 32	Enter in Round of 16
AAFU; 2 teams	PFL League 2; 8/17 teams	PFL League 2; 5/17 teams	PFL League 1; 18/18 teams	UPL; 6/12 teams	UPL; 6/12 teams
Ahrobiznes TSK Romny* (Note: The competition allows for the finalists of the Ukrainian Amateur Cup. However the finalist of the 2015 Ukrainian Amateur Cup, Balkany Zorya joined the PFL. Hence the PFL replaced their vacated spot with one of the teams from the semi-finals of the Amateur Cup (Ahrobiznes TSK Romny).); Hirnyk Sosnivka	~~Arsenal-Kyivshchyna~~ (Note: A couple of days before its first game on July 18, Arsenal-Kyivshchyna Bila Tserkva informed the PFL that due to the financial situation that they would not play the match. Being drawn against Balkany Zorya, it forfeited the match and Balkany advanced to the next round.); Balkany Zorya*; Metalurh Zaporizhia*; FC Nikopol; Nyva-V Vinnytsia*; Podillya Khmelnytskyi*; Rukh Vynnyky*; ~~Sudnobudivnyk Mykolaiv*~~; ~~Teplovyk Ivano-Frankivsk*~~; Zhemchuzhyna Odesa*	Enerhiya Nova Kakhovka; Kremin Kremenchuk; Krystal Kherson; Myr Hornostayivka; Real Pharma Odesa	Arsenal Kyiv; Avanhard Kramatorsk; Bukovyna Chernivtsi; Cherkaskyi Dnipro; Desna Chernihiv; Helios Kharkiv; Hirnyk-Sport; Illichivets Mariupol; Inhulets Petrove; Kolos Kovalivka; MFC Mykolaiv; Naftovyk-Ukrnafta; Obolon-Brovar Kyiv; FC Poltava; Skala Stryi; PFC Sumy; FC Ternopil; Veres Rivne	Chornomorets Odesa; Karpaty Lviv; Olimpik Donetsk; Stal Kamianske; Volyn Lutsk; Zirka Kropyvnytskyi	FC Dnipro; Dynamo Kyiv; FC Oleksandriya; Shakhtar Donetsk; Vorskla Poltava; Zorya Luhansk

Notes:

- With the asterisk (*) are noted the Second League teams that were recently admitted to the league from amateurs and the AAFU (amateur) team(s) that qualified in place of the Amateur Cup finalist(s).
- The reserve teams are not allowed to compete and two members of the 2016–17 Ukrainian Second League: Illichivets-2 Mariupol and Inhulets-2 Petrove were not included in the premier cup competition.
- In addition, two more teams from the Second League that were just admitted to the league, Sudnobudivnyk Mykolaiv and Teplovyk-Prykarpattia Ivano-Frankivsk, were not included in the draw for the competition.

== Bracket ==
The following is the bracket which the Ukrainian Cup resembled. Numbers in parentheses next to the match score represent the results of a penalty shoot-out.

Round of 32; 21-22 September 2017
FC Poltava	1
Zirka Kropyvnytskyi	0
Zhemchuzhyna Odesa	0 (4)
FC Karpaty Lviv (p)	0 (5)
Desna Chernihiv	1
Arsenal-Kyiv	0
Hornostayivka	1
Veres Rivne	2
Naftovyk-Ukrnafta	2
Chornomorets Odesa	0
Volyn Lutsk	2
Olimpik Donetsk	1
Nyva-V Vinnytsia	0
MFC Mykolaiv	2
Real Pharma Odesa	0
Obolon-Brovar Kyiv	2
Illichivets Mariupol	2
FC Ternopil	0
Cherkaskyi Dnipro	3
FC Stal Kamianske	3

Round of 16; 26 October 2017
FC Poltava	2
Karpaty Lviv	1
Shakhtar Donetsk	2
FC Oleksandriya	1
Desna Chernihiv	0 (6)
FC Dnipro (p)	0 (7)
Veres Rivne	0
Vorskla Poltava	1
Naftovyk-Ukrnafta	2
Volyn Lutsk	1
Dynamo Kyiv (a.e.t.)	5
Zorya Luhansk	2
MFC Mykolaiv (p)	0 (5)
Obolon Kyiv	0 (4)
Illichivets Mariupol (p)	1 (4)
Stal Kamianske	1 (2)

Quarter-finals; 30 November 2017
FC Poltava	(0)
Shakhtar Donetsk	+ (3)
FC Dnipro	1
Vorskla Poltava	0
Naftovyk-Ukrnafta	0
Dynamo Kyiv	1
MFC Mykolaiv (p)	0 (4)
Illichivets Mariupol	0 (2)

Semi-finals; 26 April 2018
Shakhtar Donetsk	1
FC Dnipro	0
MFC Mykolaiv	0
Dynamo Kyiv	4

Final; 17 May 2018
Dynamo Kyiv	0
Shakhtar Donetsk	1

Notes:

- Quarter-final games did not take place on the same day as originally planned.
- The match between Shakhtar and Poltava was determined administratively.

== Competition schedule ==
=== First Preliminary round (1/64) ===
In this round entered 8 clubs from the Second League and two representatives from the 2015 Ukrainian Amateur Cup. The round matches will be played on 20 July 2016.

20 July 2016	Arsenal-Kyivshchyna Bila Tserkva (2L)	-:+^{(1)}	(2L) Balkany Zorya
		Report

20 July 2016	Nyva-V Vinnytsia (2L)	3–1	(2L) Podillya Khmelnytskyi	Vinnytsia
18:00	Bobovych 12'; Polishchuk 39'; Iosha 68'	Report	Makarchenko 89'	Stadium: Nyva; Attendance: 2,700; Referee: Oleksandr Solovyan (Kyiv)

20 July 2016	Metalurh Zaporizhya (2L)	1–2	(2L) Zhemchuzhyna Odesa	Zaporizhia
19:00	Kaskov 88'	Report	Palamar 3'; Pospyelov 63'	Stadium: Slavutych Arena; Attendance: 1,700; Referee: Oleksandr Afanasyev (Kharkiv)

20 July 2016	Ahrobiznes TSK Romny^{(2)} (AM)	3–1	(2L) FC Nikopol-NPHU	Romny, Sumy Oblast
18:00	Tkach 5'; Havras 23'; Antsybor 73'	Report	Sharay 41'	Stadium: imeni Okipnoho; Attendance: 1,600; Referee: Oleksandr Tytov (Donetsk)

20 July 2016	Hirnyk Sosnivka (AM)	0–3	(2L) Rukh Vynnyky	Sosnivka, Lviv Oblast
17:30		Report	Omelchenko 26'; Ivanov 80'; Kozlovskyi 90+2'	Stadium: Shkilnyi; Attendance: 800; Referee: Viktor Aranovskyi (Kyiv Oblast)

Notes:'

- ^(1) Arsenal-Kyivshchyna Bila Tserkva informed the PFL that due to the financial situation that they would not play the match. Balkany Zorya advance to the next round.
- ^(2) The competition allows for the finalists of the Ukrainian Amateur Cup. However the finalist of the 2015 Ukrainian Amateur Cup, Balkany Zorya joined the PFL. Hence the PFL replaced their vacated spot with the highest-ranked team from the semi-finals of the Amateur Cup (Ahrobiznes TSK Romny).

=== Second Preliminary round (1/32) ===
In this round, 18 clubs from First League and the higher-seeded clubs from the Second League entered. They were drawn against the five winners of the First Preliminary Round. The round matches were played on 10 August 2016.

10 August 2016	Balkany Zorya (2L)	0–1	(1L) Cherkaskyi Dnipro	Zorya, Odesa Oblast
17:00		Report	Israilov 48'	Stadium: imeni Tropantsia; Attendance: 2,000; Referee: Denys Shurman (Vyshneve)

10 August 2016	Myr Hornostayivka (2L)	1–0	(1L) Avanhard Kramatorsk	Hornostayivka, Kherson Oblast
17:00	Savchenko 79'	Report	Yermakov (yellow card) 80' (yellow-red card) 82'	Stadium: Zatys; Attendance: 500; Referee: Viktor Kopiyevskyi (Kropyvnytskyi)

10 August 2016	Enerhiya Nova Kakhovka (2L)	0–2	(2L) Zhemchuzhyna Odesa	Nova Kakhovka, Kherson Oblast
17:00		Report	Tkach 46'; Lazarovych 78'	Stadium: Enerhiya; Attendance: 500; Referee: Volodymyr Novokhatniy (Kyiv)

10 August 2016	Krystal Kherson (2L)	1–4	(1L) Naftovyk-Ukrnafta Okhtyrka	Kherson
17:30	Adamenko 67'	Report	Arveladze 27'; Vechtomov 37' (pen.), 54'; Voitsekhovskyi 43'	Stadium: Krystal; Attendance: 600; Referee: Viktor Aranovskyi (Kyiv Oblast)

10 August 2016	FC Poltava (1L)	1–0	(1L) Bukovyna Chernivtsi	Poltava
17:45	Huskov 56'	Report		Stadium: Lokomotyv; Attendance: 600; Referee: Yuriy Ivanov (Makiivka)

10 August 2016	FC Ternopil (1L)	1–0	(1L) Skala Stryi	Ternopil
18:00	Gevlich 12'	Report		Stadium: Ternopilskyi Miskyi; Attendance: 2,215; Referee: Mykhailo Mytrovskyi (Uzhhorod)

10 August 2016	Rukh Vynnyky (2L)	2–3	(1L) Arsenal Kyiv	Vynnyky, Lviv
18:00	Baranets 84'; Sheptytskyi 87'	Report	Semchuk 40'; Eseola 63'; Bykovskyi 63'	Stadium: imeni Markevycha; Attendance: 1,200; Referee: Volodymyr Milanych (Mykolaiv)

10 August 2016	Ahrobiznes TSK Romny (AM)	0–2	(2L) Nyva-V Vinnytsia	Romny, Sumy Oblast
18:00		Report	Polishchuk 45'; Ngaha 65' (pen.)	Stadium: imeni Okipnoho; Attendance: 2,000; Referee: Oleksiy Derevinskyi (Kyiv)

10 August 2016	Kremin Kremenchuk (2L)	1–2	(2L) Real Pharma Odesa	Kremenchuk, Poltava Oblast
18:00	Bytsko 45'	Report	Kureliekh 57'; Kulishenko 86'	Stadium: Kremin-Arena; Attendance: 1,200; Referee: Roman Kalyta (Mykolaiv)

10 August 2016	Kolos Kovalivka (1L)	1–2 (a.e.t.)	(1L) Veres Rivne	Kovalivka, Kyiv Oblast
18:00	Kozyr 8'	Report	Sikorskyi 62'; Stepanyuk 91'	Stadium: Kolos; Attendance: 750; Referee: Dmytro Panchyshyn (Kharkiv)

10 August 2016	FC Sumy (1L)	0–1 (a.e.t.)	(1L) Illichivets Mariupol	Sumy
18:00		Report	Papuk 112'	Stadium: Yuvileinyi; Attendance: 1,040; Referee: Vitaliy Romanov (Dnipro)

10 August 2016	Inhulets Petrove (1L)	1–1 (a.e.t.) (1–3 p)	(1L) MFC Mykolaiv	Petrove, Kirovohrad Oblast
18:00	Kolyesnikov 87'	Report	Berko 43'	Stadium: Inhulets; Attendance: 1,000; Referee: Serhiy Skrypak (Kyiv)
	Penalties
	Muchak (penalty missed); Krasov (penalty missed); Mishurenko (penalty missed); Zhukov (penalty scored)		(penalty scored) Berko; (penalty missed) Hvozdevych; (penalty scored) Batyushyn; (penalty scored) Mukhovykov

10 August 2016	Obolon-Brovar Kyiv (1L)	1–0 (a.e.t.)	(1L) Hirnyk-Sport Komsomolsk	Kyiv
18:00	Hordiychuk 107'	Report		Stadium: Obolon Arena; Attendance: 1,100; Referee: Oleksandr Omelchenko (Slovyansk)

10 August 2016	Helios Kharkiv (1L)	0–1	(1L) Desna Chernihiv	Kharkiv
18:00		Report	Hordiychuk 82'; Makhnovskyi (red card) 86'	Stadium: Sonyachnyi; Attendance: 1,000; Referee: Oleksandr Shandor (Lviv)

=== Round of 32 (1/16) ===
In this round six teams from the 2016–17 Ukrainian Premier League (bottom placed) and 14 winners from the Second Preliminary round enter this stage of the competition which also includes 10 teams from the 2016–17 Ukrainian First League, 4 teams from the 2016–17 Ukrainian Second League. While only 20 teams participated in the round, officially it was identified as the Round of 32 or the 1/16 finals. (see Single-elimination tournament#nomenclature) The draw for this round was held on 17 August 2016 at the House of Football in Kyiv.

21 September 2016	FC Poltava (1L)	1–0	(PL) Zirka Kropyvnytskyi	Poltava
16:00	Kovtun 20'	Report		Stadium: Lokomotov Stadium; Attendance: 600; Referee: Volodymyr Mylanych (Mykolaiv)

21 September 2016	Zhemchuzhyna Odesa (2L)	0 – 0 (a.e.t.) (4–5 p)	(PL) Karpaty Lviv	Odesa
16:30		Report		Stadium: Spartak Stadium; Attendance: 2,100; Referee: Mykola Kryvonosov (Kyiv)
	Penalties
	Palamar (penalty missed); Pospyelov (penalty scored); Malysh (penalty scored); Ushakov (penalty scored); Potarochenko (penalty scored)		(penalty scored) Ksyonz; (penalty scored) Yaroshenko; (penalty scored) Kostevych; (penalty scored) Leschuk; (penalty scored) Novotryasov

21 September 2016	Myr Hornostayivka (2L)	1–2	(1L) Veres Rivne	Hornostaivka, Kherson Oblast
16:30	Komyahin 21'	Report	Zozulya 12'; Kozban 81'	Stadium: Zatys Stadium; Attendance: 1,200; Referee: Dmytro Bondarenko

21 September 2016	Nyva-V Vinnytsia (2L)	0–2	(1L) MFC Mykolaiv	Vinnytsia
17:00		Report	Berko 73'; Sarskiyan 90+3'	Stadium: Sports Complex Nyva; Attendance: 1,600; Referee: Oleksandr Plavyuk

21 September 2016	Desna Chernihiv (1L)	1–0	(1L) Arsenal Kyiv	Kharkiv
17:00		Report	Favorov 83'	Stadium: Sonyachny Training Center^{(3)} Attendance: 50; Referee: Yuriy Foshchiy

21 September 2016	Naftovyk-Ukrnafta Okhtyrka (1L)	2–0	(PL) Chornomorets Odesa	Okhtyrka, Sumy Oblast
18:00	Cherniy 29'; Lozovyi 86'	Report		Stadium: Naftovyk Stadium; Attendance: 3,100; Referee: Vitaliy Romanov

21 September 2016	Illichivets Mariupol (1L)	2–0	(1L) FC Ternopil	Mariupol, Donetsk Oblast
18:00	Nekhtiy 31'; Buy 33'	Report		Stadium: Illichivets Stadium; Attendance: 1,000; Referee: Andriy Kuzmyn

21 September 2016	Cherkaskyi Dnipro (1L)	1–3	(PL) Stal Kamianske	Cherkasy
18:30	Tarasenko 16'	Report	Kalenchuk 75'; Karasyuk 80'; Voronin 90'	Stadium: Central Stadium; Attendance: 2,600; Referee: Serhiy Dankovskiy

21 September 2016	Volyn Lutsk (PL)	2–1	(PL) Olimpik Donetsk	Lutsk
19:00	Lohinov 65'; Deda 82'	Report	Hryn 67'	Stadium: Avanhard Stadium; Attendance: 1,280; Referee: Serhiy Skrypak

22 September 2016	Real Pharma Odesa (2L)	0–2	(1L) Obolon-Brovar Kyiv	Odesa
16:00		Report	Korolchuk 57', 88'	Stadium: Spartak Stadium; Attendance: 361; Referee: Viktor Kopiyevskyi

Notes:

- ^(3) Due to reconstruction of the pitch at Chernihiv Stadium, match moved to Sonyachny Training Center.

=== Round of 16 (1/8) ===
In this round, six teams from the 2016–17 Ukrainian Premier League (top placed) and 10 winners from the Round of 20 enter this stage of the competition which also includes 3 more teams from the 2016–17 Ukrainian Premier League, 7 teams from the 2016–17 Ukrainian First League. The draw was held on 23 September 2016 at the House of Football in Kyiv.

26 October 2016	FC Poltava (1L)	2–1	(PL) Karpaty Lviv	Poltava
14:00	Kovtun 4'; Troyanovskyi 42'	Report	Okechukwu 54'	Stadium: Lokomotov; Attendance: 1,500; Referee: Mykola Kryvonosov (Kyiv)

26 October 2016	Veres Rivne (1L)	0–1	(PL) Vorskla Poltava	Rivne
15:00		Report	Kolomoyets 34'	Stadium: Avanhard Stadium; Attendance: 5,436; Referee: Ivan Bodnar (Kyiv)

26 October 2016	Desna Chernihiv (1L)	0 – 0 (a.e.t.) (6–7 p)	(PL) FC Dnipro	Kyiv^{(4)}
15:00		Report	Kolomoyets 34'	Stadium: Obolon Stadium; Attendance: 2,070; Referee: Yaroslav Kozyk (Mukacheve)
	Penalties
	Chepurnenko (penalty scored); Maksymenko (penalty missed); Filippov (penalty scored); Kartushov (penalty scored); Favorov (penalty scored); Mostovyi (penalty scored); Melnyk (penalty scored); Chornomorets (penalty missed)		(penalty scored) Pico; (penalty scored) Vakulko; (penalty scored) Rotan; (penalty scored) Bliznichenko; (penalty missed) Vlad; (penalty scored) Kravchenko; (penalty scored) Kozhushko; (penalty scored) Lopyryonok

26 October 2016	Illichivets Mariupol (1L)	1 – 1 (a.e.t.) (4–2 p)	(PL) Stal Kamianske	Mariupol, Donetsk Oblast
17:00	Kozhanov 51'	Report	Danso 7'	Stadium: Illichivets Stadium; Attendance: 900; Referee: Serhiy Berezka (Kyiv)
	Penalties
	Vakulenko (penalty scored); Kisil (penalty scored); Myshnyov (penalty scored); Lebedenko (penalty missed); Koltsov (penalty scored)		(penalty scored) Voronin; (penalty missed) Ishchenko; (penalty scored) Karikari; (penalty missed) Pashayev

26 October 2016	Naftovyk-Ukrnafta Okhtyrka (1L)	2–1	(PL) Volyn Lutsk	Okhtyrka, Sumy Oblast
18:00	Y. Pasich 17'; H. Pasich 67'	Report	Memeshev 86' (pen.)	Stadium: Naftovyk Stadium; Attendance: 3,150; Referee: Anatoliy Abdula (Kharkiv)

26 October 2016	MFC Mykolaiv (1L)	0 – 0 (a.e.t.) (5–4 p)	(1L) Obolon-Brovar Kyiv	Mykolaiv
18:30		Report		Stadium: Central Stadium; Attendance: 730; Referee: Vitaliy Romanov (Dnipro)
	Penalties
	Sarkisyan (penalty missed); Berko (penalty scored); Kovalyov (penalty scored); Sartina (penalty scored); Batyushyn (penalty scored); Bulychev (penalty scored)		(penalty scored) Kovalenko; (penalty scored) Ablitarov; (penalty scored) Pronevych; (penalty missed) Korolchuk; (penalty scored) Brovchenko; (penalty missed) Shevchuk

26 October 2016	Dynamo Kyiv (PL)	5 – 2 (a.e.t.)	(PL) Zorya Luhansk	Kyiv
19:00	González 14', 97'; Tsyhankov 65'; Moraes 100' (pen.), 119'	Report	Forster 22' (pen.); Sivakow 89'	Stadium: NSC Olimpiyskiy; Attendance: 5,347; Referee: Anatoliy Zhabchenko (Khmelnytskyi)

26 October 2016	Shakhtar Donetsk (PL)	2–1	(PL) FC Oleksandriya	Lviv
19:30	Stepanenko 13'; Marlos 90+2'	Report	Yaremchuk 90+4'	Stadium: Arena Lviv; Attendance: 1,210; Referee: Oleksandr Derdo (Chornomorsk)

Notes:

- ^(4) Due to reconstruction of the pitch at Chernihiv Stadium, match moved to Obolon Arena.

=== Quarterfinals ===
In this round will participate 4 teams from the 2016–17 Ukrainian Premier League and 4 teams from the 2016–17 Ukrainian First League. The draw was held on 27 October 2016 at the House of Football in Kyiv.

26 November 2016	MFC Mykolaiv (1L)	0 – 0 (a.e.t.) (4–2 p)	(1L) Illichivets Mariupol	Mykolaiv
17:00		Report		Stadium: Central City Stadium; Attendance: 1,500; Referee: Yuriy Vaks
	Penalties
	Sarkisyan (penalty scored); Shavrin (penalty scored); Sartina (penalty scored); Batyushin (penalty scored)		(penalty scored) Kozak; (penalty scored) Sydorenko; (penalty missed) Mishnyov; (penalty missed) Fomin

30 November 2016	FC Dnipro (PL)	1 – 0	(PL) Vorskla Poltava	Dnipro
19:00	Balanyuk 73'	Report		Stadium: Dnipro Arena; Attendance: 1,401; Referee: Anatoliy Zhabchenko

5 April 2017^{(5)}	Naftovyk-Ukrnafta Okhtyrka (1L)	0 – 1	(PL) Dynamo Kyiv	Okhtyrka, Sumy Oblast
17:00		Report	Harmash 19'	Stadium: Naftovyk Stadium; Attendance: 4,930; Referee: Yuriy Hrysyo

5 April 2017^{(6)}	FC Poltava (1L)	w/o (0 – 3)^{(7)}	(PL) Shakhtar Donetsk	Poltava
14:00		Report		Stadium: Lokomotyv Stadium

Notes:

- ^(5) Originally the match was scheduled for November 30 but was postponed due to the frozen pitch at Naftovyk Stadium being unplayable.
- ^(6) Originally the match was scheduled for November 30 but was postponed due to the frozen pitch at Lokomotyv Stadium being unplayable.
- ^(7) Control-Disciplinary Committee of the FFU awards a 3–0 technical victory to Shakhtar due to the state of the pitch at Lokomotyv Stadium

=== Semifinals ===
In this round will participate 3 teams from the 2016–17 Ukrainian Premier League and 1 team from the 2016–17 Ukrainian First League. The draw was held on 6 April 2017 at the Hilton hotel in Kyiv. During the draw there was identified a host for the final whom will be the winner of Shakhtar-Dnipro pair.

26 April 2017	MFC Mykolaiv (1L)	0–4	(PL) Dynamo Kyiv	Mykolaiv
18:00		Report	Yarmolenko 45+1', 81' (pen.), 90+1'; Kadar 62'	Stadium: Central City Stadium; Attendance: 14,100; Referee: Kateryna Monzul

26 April 2017	Shakhtar Donetsk (PL)	1–0	(PL) FC Dnipro	Kharkiv
20:00	Taison 68'	Report		Stadium: Metalist Stadium; Attendance: 4,751; Referee: Oleksandr Derdo

=== Final ===
17 May 2017	Shakhtar Donetsk (PL)	1–0	(PL) Dynamo Kyiv	Metalist Stadium, Kharkiv
21:00 LST	Marlos 81'	Report		Attendance: 25,000; Referee: Kostyantyn Trukhanov

== Top goalscorers ==
The competition's top ten goalscorers including qualification rounds.

As of 17 May 2017

Rank	Scorer	Team	Goals (Pen.)
1	(Ukraine) Andriy Yarmolenko	Dynamo Kyiv	3 (1)
2	(Ukraine) Viktor Berko	MFC Mykolaiv	2
2	(Paraguay) Derlis González	Dynamo Kyiv	2
2	(Ukraine) Artem Korolchuk	Obolon-Brovar Kyiv	2
2	(Ukraine) Oleksiy Kovtun	FC Poltava	2
2	(Brazil) Marlos	Shakhtar Donetsk	2
2	(Ukraine) Volodymyr Polishchuk	Nyva-V Vinnytsia	2
2	(Ukraine) Oleh Sheptytskyi	Rukh Vynnyky	2
2	(Brazil) Júnior Moraes	Dynamo Kyiv	2 (1)
2	(Ukraine) Oleksandr Vechtomov	Naftovyk-Ukrnafta Okhtyrka	2 (1)

== See also ==
- 2016–17 Ukrainian Premier League
- 2016–17 Ukrainian First League
- 2016–17 Ukrainian Second League
- 2016–17 UEFA Europa League
