= 2015–16 FC Stal Dniprodzerzhynsk season =

Stal Dniprodzerzhynsk
2015–16 season
- Chairman: Maksym Zavhorodny
- Manager: Volodymyr Mazyar
- Stadium: Meteor Stadium
- Premier League: 6th
- Ukrainian Cup: Round of 32
- Top goalscorer: League: Putrash (2); All: Putrash (2)
- Highest home attendance: 4,700 vs Dynamo Kyiv; 19 July 2015
- Lowest home attendance: 2,100 vs Volyn Lutsk; 16 August 2015
- Average home league attendance: 3,650
Home colours	Away colours

The 2014–15 Stal Dniprodzerzhynsk season was Stal's first Ukrainian Premier League season, and their third season under manager Volodymyr Mazyar. During the season Stal Dniprodzerzhynsk competed in the Ukrainian Premier League and in the Ukrainian Cup.

== Friendly matches ==
=== Pre-season ===
24 June 2015	Stal Dniprodzerzhynsk	3 – 1	Olimpik Donetsk	Bucha
	Kozak 24'; A. Kravchenko 41'; K. Kravchenko 67' (pen.)	Summary	Kadymyan 69'	Stadium: Yulileinyi Stadium; Attendance: 250

26 June 2015	Dynamo-2 Kyiv	0 – 1	Stal Dniprodzerzhynsk	Kyiv
		Summary	Adamyuk 86'	Stadium: Dynamo Club Stadium; Attendance: 50

2 July 2015	Stal Dniprodzerzhynsk	2 – 1	Desna Chernihiv	Bucha
18:00 EEST (UTC+3)	? 16' ? 22'	Summary	Kisil 90'	Stadium: Yulileinyi Stadium; Attendance: ?

4 July 2015	Stal Dniprodzerzhynsk	2 – 0	Olimpik Donetsk	Bucha
18:00 EEST (UTC+3)	Budnik 74' (pen.), 76'	Summary		Stadium: Yulileinyi Stadium; Attendance: 200

6 July 2015	Stal Dniprodzerzhynsk	1 – 0	Cherkaskyi Dnipro	Bucha
18:00 EEST (UTC+3)	Vasin 11'	Summary		Stadium: Yulileinyi Stadium; Attendance: 100

7 July 2015	Stal Dniprodzerzhynsk	4 – 2	Kolos Kovalivka	Kovalivka
17:00 EEST (UTC+3)	Vasin; Budnik; Kulach		? ?	Stadium: Kolos Stadium; Attendance: ?

== Competitions ==
=== Premier League ===
==== League table ====
Pos	Team	Pld	W	D	L	GF	GA	GD	Pts	Qualification or relegation
6	FC Oleksandriya	26	10	8	8	30	29	+1	38	Qualification to Europa League third qualifying round
7	Karpaty Lviv	26	8	6	12	26	37	−11	30	
8	Stal Dniprodzerzhynsk	26	7	8	11	22	31	−9	29	
9	Olimpik Donetsk	26	6	7	13	22	35	−13	25	
10	Metalist Kharkiv	26	5	9	12	19	46	−27	24	Failed to receive attestation for the next season (Note: On 22 April 2016, the FFU Committee announced that Metalist Kharkiv and Hoverla Uzhhorod would not be allowed to participate in the professional competitions because of their debts to their players as well as Volyn Lutsk due to the fact that they had not even applied for a license for the following season. On 16 May 2016 the FFU Appeal Committee adopted decision to leave in force the decision of the FFU Football Clubs Attestation Committee of 22 April 2016 and refuse in issuing attestation for the next season for Hoverla Uzhhorod and Metalist Kharkiv by declining their appeals.)

Source: uafootball.net.ua
Rules for classification: 1) Points; 2) Goal difference; 3) Goals scored; 4) Head-to-head points; 5) Head-to-head goal difference; 6) Head-to-head goals scored; 7) Fairplay ranking; 8) Draw.

==== Results summary ====
Overall								Home						Away					
Pld	W	D	L	GF	GA	GD	Pts	W	D	L	GF	GA	GD	W	D	L	GF	GA	GD
6	2	1	3	5	5	0	7	1	0	2	4	4	0	1	1	1	1	1	0

==== Results by round ====
Round	1	2	3	4	5	6	7	8	9	10	11	12	13	14	15	16	17	18	19	20	21	22	23	24	25	26
Ground	H	A	H	A	H	A	H																			
Result	L	L	W	W	L	D																				
Position	11	13	9	6	8	9																				

Updated to match(es) played on 29 August 2015. Source: Socceraway
A = Away; H = Home; W = Win; D = Draw; L = Loss

==== Matches ====
19 July 2015 1	Stal Dniprodzerzhynsk	1 – 2	Dynamo Kyiv	Dnipropetrovsk
19:30 EEST (UTC+3)	Veloso 4' (o.g.); Voronin (yellow card) 52'; Ischenko (yellow card) 52' (red card) 52'	Summary	Buyalskyi 44' (yellow card) 58'; Husyev 53' (pen.); Silva (red card) 60'; Belhanda (yellow card) 72'; Yarmolenko (yellow card) 88'	Stadium: Meteor Stadium; Attendance: 4,700; Referee: Yuriy Hrysio

25 July 2015 2	Karpaty Lviv	1 – 0	Stal Dniprodzerzhynsk	Lviv
17:00 EEST (UTC+3)	Karnoza 86' (pen.)	Report	Kalenchuk (yellow card) 8'; Baranovskyi (yellow card) 74'; Budnik (yellow card) 85'; Voronin (yellow card) 90+4'	Stadium: Ukraina Stadium; Attendance: 4,226; Referee: Oleksandr Ivanov

2 August 2015 3	Stal Dniprodzerzhynsk	2 – 0	Zorya Luhansk	Dnipropetrovsk
19:30 EEST (UTC+3)	Putrash 25', 55'; Vasin (yellow card) 62'	Summary	Lukanov (yellow card) 34'; Lipartia (yellow card) 52'; Yarmash (yellow card) 71'	Stadium: Meteor Stadium; Attendance: 2,600; Referee: Anatolii Zhabchenko

8 August 2015 4	Oleksandriya	0 – 1	Stal Dniprodzerzhynsk	Oleksandriya
19:30 EEST (UTC+3)	Chorniy (yellow card) 27'; Shendrik (yellow card) 78'	Summary	Banada 22' (o.g.); Kravchenko (yellow card) 36'; Putrash (yellow card) 74'; Voronin (yellow card) 77'	Stadium: CSC Nika Stadium; Attendance: 4,000; Referee: Mykola Balakin

16 August 2015 5	Stal Dniprodzerzhynsk	1 – 2	Volyn Lutsk	Dnipropetrovsk
17:00 EEST (UTC+3)	48' Kulach		29' (o.g.) Pshenychnykh; (yellow card) 56' Nasonov; (yellow card) 60' Matei; (yellow card) 73' Shabanov; 80' Kobakhidze	Stadium: Meteor Stadium; Attendance: 2,100; Referee: Yevhen Aranovsky

29 August 2015 6	Hoverla Uzhhorod	v	Stal Dniprodzerzhynsk	Uzhhorod
17:00 EEST (UTC+3)		[ Summary]		Stadium: Avanhard Stadium

=== Ukrainian Cup ===
21 August 2015 Round of 32	Cherkaskyi Dnipro	1 - 3	Stal Dniprodzerzhynsk	Cherkasy
17:00 EEST (UTC+3)	Andriy Skarlosh (yellow card) 45'; Anatoliy Burlin (yellow card) 58'; Oleksandr Batalskiy 83'; Igor Medynskyi (yellow card) 90'	Summary	Kozak 21'; Anatoliy Burlin 53' (o.g.); Kulach 69'	Stadium: Central Stadium; Attendance: 3,650; Referee: (Ukraine) Sergii Dankovskyi

== Notes ==
1. Stal Dniprodzerzhynsk play their home matches at Meteor Stadium, Dnipropetrovsk instead of their regular stadium, Metalurh Stadium, Dniprodzerzhynsk, due to its reconstruction.

== Squad statistics ==
As of match played 9 August 2015

=== Appearances and goals ===
No.	Pos	Nat	Player	Total		Premier League		Ukrainian Cup	
No.	Pos	Nat	Player	Apps	Goals	Apps	Goals	Apps	Goals
2	DF	(Ukraine) UKR	Artem Baranovskyi	2	0	1+1	0	0	0
3	DF	(Ukraine) UKR	Volodymyr Adamyuk	5	0	5	0	0	0
4	DF	(Ukraine) UKR	Anton Kravchenko	3	0	3	0	0	0
6	MF	(Ukraine) UKR	Maksym Kalenchuk	5	0	5	0	0	0
7	DF	(Ukraine) UKR	Serhiy Voronin	5	0	5	0	0	0
8	FW	(Ukraine) UKR	Volodymyr Homenyuk	3	0	2+1	0	0	0
10	FW	(Ukraine) UKR	Vladyslav Kulach	4	1	4	1	0	0
11	FW	(Ukraine) UKR	Yevhen Budnik	4	0	0+4	0	0	0
12	GK	(Ukraine) UKR	Oleksandr Bandura	3	0	3	0	0	0
14	MF	(Ukraine) UKR	Anton Kotlyar	5	0	1+4	0	0	0
19	DF	(Ukraine) UKR	Serhiy Pshenychnykh	5	0	5	0	0	0
21	MF	(Ukraine) UKR	Valeriy Kucherov	3	0	1+2	0	0	0
29	MF	(Ukraine) UKR	Ruslan Babenko	1	0	0+1	0	0	0
32	DF	(Ukraine) UKR	Mykola Ischenko	1	0	1	0	0	0
39	MF	(Ukraine) UKR	Denys Vasin	5	0	5	0	0	0
44	DF	(Ukraine) UKR	Yuriy Putrash	5	2	4+1	2	0	0
79	GK	(Ukraine) UKR	Yuriy Pankiv	2	0	2	0	0	0
91	MF	(Ukraine) UKR	Roman Karasyuk	5	0	5	0	0	0
93	FW	(Ukraine) UKR	Roman Debelko	3	0	3	0	0	0
Players who left Stal Dniprodzerzhynsk during the season :
17	MF	(Ukraine) UKR	Anton Postupalenko	1	0	0+1	0	0	0

=== Goalscorers ===
Place	Position	Nation	Number	Name	Premier League	Ukrainian Cup	Total
1	DF	(Ukraine)	44	Yuriy Putrash	2	0	2
1				Own goal	2	0	2
3	FW	(Ukraine)	10	Vladyslav Kulach	1	0	1
TOTALS					5	0	5

=== Disciplinary record ===
Number	Nation	Position	Name	Premier League		Ukrainian Cup		Total	
Number	Nation	Position	Name	Yellow card	Red card	Yellow card	Red card	Yellow card	Red card
2	(Ukraine)	DF	Artem Baranovskyi	1	0	0	0	1	0
4	(Ukraine)	DF	Anton Kravchenko	1	0	0	0	1	0
6	(Ukraine)	MF	Maksym Kalenchuk	1	0	0	0	1	0
7	(Ukraine)	DF	Serhiy Voronin	3	0	0	0	3	0
11	(Ukraine)	FW	Yevhen Budnik	1	0	0	0	1	0
32	(Ukraine)	DF	Mykola Ischenko	1	1	0	0	1	1
39	(Ukraine)	MF	Denys Vasin	1	0	0	0	1	0
44	(Ukraine)	DF	Yuriy Putrash	1	0	0	0	1	0
			TOTALS	10	1	0	0	10	1
