= Kwame Karikari =

Ghanaian footballer

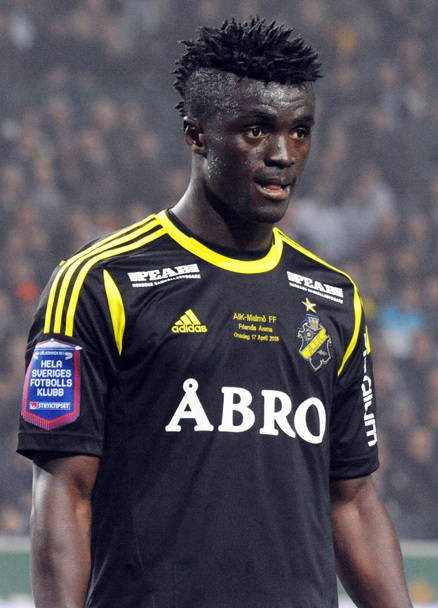
- Karikari playing for AIK in 2013

Personal information
- Full name: Kwame Amponsah Karikari
- Date of birth: 20 January 1992 (age 34)
- Place of birth: Ghana
- Height: 1.90 m (6 ft 3 in)
- Position: Forward

Team information
- Current team: Kasetsart
- Number: 11

Senior career*
Years	Team	Apps	(Gls)
2009–2011	International Allies	20	(13)
2011–2014	AIK	43	(8)
2012	→ Degerfors (loan)	15	(6)
2013–2014	→ Balıkesirspor (loan)	23	(11)
2015	Halmstad	9	(2)
2015	→ Balıkesirspor (loan)	12	(0)
2016	Haugesund	13	(2)
2016	→ Irtysh Pavlodar (loan)	0	(0)
2016–2017	Stal Kamianske	26	(7)
2017–2018	Al-Markhiya	12	(3)
2018	Al-Arabi	9	(5)
2018–2019	Neftchi Baku	8	(2)
2019	→ Al Urooba (loan)	12	(2)
2019–2020	Dinamo Tbilisi	8	(2)
2020	Hapoel Petah Tikva	3	(0)
2021	Turon	5	(0)
2021–2022	Nakhon Ratchasima	29	(13)
2022–2023	Chennaiyin	16	(4)
2023–2024	Police Tero	18	(2)
2024–	Nakhon Pathom United	5	(0)
2025–	→ Kasetsart (loan)	0	(0)

International career
2011	Ghana U20	2	(0)
- * Club domestic league appearances and goals as of 26 May 2024 (UTC)

Kwame Amponsah Karikari (born 21 January 1992) is a Ghanaian professional footballer who plays as a forward for Thai League 2 club Kasetsart.

== Career ==
=== Sweden ===
Karikari came to AIK in 2011 and made 18 appearances during the 2011 season, during which he scored on two occasions. Then he was loaned out to Superettan team Degerfors IF during the first half of the 2012 season. During his stay there he made 15 appearances and scored six goals. In August 2012 he was called back to AIK.

As he returned he came to score many vital goals for AIK in their Europa League adventure, he scored against PSV Eindhoven and CSKA Moscow.

=== Turkey ===
For the 2013–14 season, he was loaned to Balıkesirspor, a football club from Balıkesir, Turkey that competes in the TFF First League. In his first 12 matches for the club, he contributed 5 goals and 3 assists as Balıkesirspor topped the table.

=== Haugesund ===
On 3 March 2016, Karikari signed an eighteen-month contract with FK Haugesund.

=== Irtysh Pavlodar ===
On 30 June 2016, FC Irtysh Pavlodar confirmed the signing of Karikari, on loan from FK Haugesund until the end of the 2016 season.

=== Neftchi Baku ===
On 29 June 2018, Karikari signed a two-year contract with Azerbaijan Premier League side Neftçi PFK.

In January 2019, Karikari joined UAE Division One side Al Urooba on loan from Neftçi.

On 15 July 2019, Karikari's contract with Neftçi was terminated by mutual consent.

=== Dinamo Tbilisi ===
On 15 July 2019, Dinamo Tbilisi announced signing of Karikari on a one-year contract, with the option of an additional year.

== Career statistics ==
=== Club ===
As of 19 April 2023

Club	Season	League			National Cup		League Cup		Continental		Total	
Club	Season	Division	Apps	Goals	Apps	Goals	Apps	Goals	Apps	Goals	Apps	Goals
AIK	2011	Allsvenskan	18	2	1 (Note: Appearance(s) in Swedish Cup)	0	0	0	—		19	2
AIK	2012	Allsvenskan	12	5	1	0	0	0	8 (Note: Appearance(s) in UEFA Europa League)	2	21	7
AIK	2013	Allsvenskan	9	1	3	0	0	0	—		12	1
AIK	2014	Allsvenskan	4	0	0	0	0	0	2	0	6	0
AIK	AIK total		43	8	5	0	0	0	10	2	58	10
Degerfors (loan)	2012	Superettan	15	6	0	0	0	0	—		15	6
Balıkesirspor (loan)	2013–14	1. Lig	23	11	3 (Note: Appearance(s) in Turkish Cup)	1	0	0	—		26	12
Halmstad	2015	Allsvenskan	9	2	3	2	0	0	—		12	4
Balıkesirspor (loan)	2015–16	1. Lig	12	0	2	0	0	0	—		14	0
Haugesund	2016	Eliteserien	13	2	1 (Note: Appearance(s) in Norwegian Football Cup)	2	0	0	—		14	4
Stal Kamianske	2016–17	Ukrainian Premier League	26	7	2 (Note: Appearance(s) in Ukrainian Cup)	0	0	0	—		28	7
Al-Markhiya	2017–18	Qatar Stars League	12	3	2 (Note: Appearance(s) in Qatari Stars Cup)	0	0	0	—		14	3
Al-Arabi	2017–18	Qatar Stars League	9	5	0	0	0	0	—		9	5
Neftchi Baku	2018–19	Azerbaijan Premier League	8	2	0	0	0	0	2	0	10	2
Al Urooba (loan)	2018–19	UAE First Division League	12	2	0	0	0	0	—		12	2
Dinamo Tbilisi	2019	Erovnuli Liga	8	2	0	0	0	0	3	1	11	3
Hapoel Petah Tikva	2020–21	Liga Leumit	3	0	0	0	0	0	—		3	0
Turon	2021	Uzbekistan Super League	5	0	1 (Note: Appearance(s) in Uzbekistan Cup)	0	0	0	—		6	0
Nakhon Ratchasima	2021–22	Thai League 1	29	13	6 (Note: Appearance(s) in Thai FA Cup)	4	1 (Note: Appearance(s) in Thai League Cup)	0	—		36	17
Chennaiyin	2022–23	Indian Super League	16	4	4 (Note: Appearance(s) in Durand Cup)	1	3 (Note: Appearance(s) in Super Cup)	0	—		23	5
Career total			242	67	29	10	4	0	15	3	291	80
