= Oleksandr Vechtomov =

Ukrainian footballer

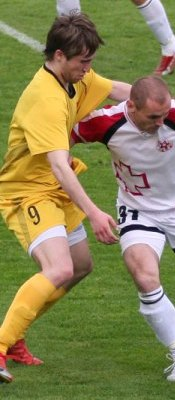

Personal information
- Full name: Oleksandr Olehovych Vechtomov
- Date of birth: 11 January 1988 (age 38)
- Place of birth: Kyiv, Ukrainian SSR
- Height: 1.82 m (5 ft 11 1/2 in)
- Position: Centre-back

Team information
- Current team: Wicher Kobyłka
- Number: 88

Youth career
- 2001–2002: Zmina-Obolon Kyiv
- 2002–2005: Borysfen Schaslyve

Senior career*
Years	Team	Apps	(Gls)
2005–2006	Tavriya Simferopol	0	(0)
2006	Krymteplytsia Molodizhne	5	(0)
2007–2008	Obolon-2 Kyiv	54	(8)
2009	Nyva Vinnytsia	6	(0)
2009–2010	Zirka Kirovohrad	23	(0)
2010–2011	Sumy	23	(0)
2011–2013	Bukovyna Chernivtsi	66	(3)
2014–2016	Naftovyk-Ukrnafta Okhtyrka	69	(7)
2017	Inhulets Petrove	9	(0)
2017	Arsenal Kyiv	15	(0)
2018	Polissya Zhytomyr	0	(0)
2019	Bukovyna Chernivtsi	9	(0)
2019–2020	Shevardeni-1906 Tbilisi	23	(0)
2021	VPK-Ahro Shevchenkivka	3	(0)
2021–2022	Shevardeni-1906 Tbilisi	16	(0)
2022	Grün-Weiß Lübben	1	(0)
2022–2023	Polonia Przemyśl	18	(3)
2023	Błonianka Błonie	12	(1)
2024	Huragan Wołomin	11	(3)
2024–	Wicher Kobyłka	11	(2)
- * Club domestic league appearances and goals as of 01:06, 25 December 2024 (UTC)

Oleksandr Vechtomov (Ukrainian: Олександр Олегович Вечтомов; born 11 January 1988) is a Ukrainian footballer who plays as a centre-back for Polish regional league club Wicher Kobyłka.

== Career ==
Vechtomov is a product of the FC Zmina-Obolon Kyiv and FC Schaslyve youth sport schools and spent a career playing for the different lower leagues' Ukrainian teams. In July 2017 he signed a contract with FC Arsenal Kyiv.
