= Dmytro Sartina =

Ukrainian footballer

Personal information
- Full name: Dmytro Ivanovych Sartina
- Date of birth: 22 February 1992 (age 34)
- Place of birth: Uzhhorod, Ukraine
- Height: 1.81 m (5 ft 11 in)
- Position: Centre-back

Team information
- Current team: Uzhhorod
- Number: 69

Youth career
- 2005–2007: SDYuSShOR Uzhhorod
- 2008–2009: Shakhtar Donetsk

Senior career*
Years	Team	Apps	(Gls)
2009–2013	Shakhtar-3 Donetsk	85	(1)
2014–2015	Helios Kharkiv	31	(0)
2016–2017	Mykolaiv	41	(2)
2017–2018	Obolon-Brovar Kyiv	25	(2)
2018–2019	Mykolaiv	27	(3)
2019	→ Mykolaiv-2	2	(0)
2020–	Uzhhorod	38	(0)
- * Club domestic league appearances and goals as of 14 February 2022

Dmytro Ivanovych Sartina (Ukrainian: Дмитро Іванович Сартіна; born 22 February 1992) is a Ukrainian professional footballer who plays as a centre-back for Ukrainian club Uzhhorod.
