= Svyatoslav Kozlovskyi =

Ukrainian footballer

Personal information
- Full name: Svyatoslav Hryhorovych Kozlovskyi
- Date of birth: 26 March 1994 (age 32)
- Place of birth: Lviv Oblast, Ukraine
- Height: 1.83 m (6 ft 0 in)
- Position: Forward

Youth career
- 2007–2009: Karpaty Lviv
- 2009–2011: Metalist Kharkiv

Senior career*
Years	Team	Apps	(Gls)
2011–2012	Lviv	12	(1)
2012	Karpaty Lviv	0	(0)
2012–2013	Rukh Vynnyky	9	(1)
2013	Metalist Kharkiv	0	(0)
2013–2014	Rukh Vynnyky	38	(11)
2015	Dnipro Dnipropetrovsk	0	(0)
2015	Metalist Kharkiv	0	(0)
2016–2018	Rukh Vynnyky	29	(8)
2018–2019	Olímpic Xàtiva	0	(0)
2019–2021	Rukh Lviv	1	(0)

International career
2011–2012	Ukraine-18	4	(2)
- * Club domestic league appearances and goals

Svyatoslav Kozlovskyi (Ukrainian: Святослав Григорович Козловський; born 26 March 1994) is a Ukrainian former professional football striker.

== Club career ==
Kozlovskyi is a product of youth team systems of FC Karpaty and FC Metalist.

== International ==
He was called up for training process of the Ukraine national under-21 football team in January 2015.
