= Oleksii Krasov =

Ukrainian businessman and politician

Oleksiy Krasov
- Олексій Красов
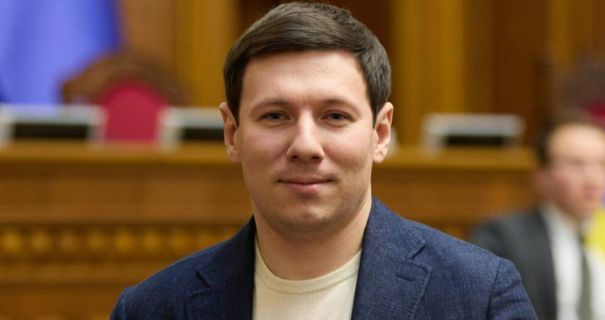
- Official portrait, 2019

People's Deputy of Ukraine
- Incumbent
- Assumed office 29 August 2019
- Preceded by: Oleksandr Bilovol
- Constituency: Kharkiv Oblast, No. 180

Personal details
- Born: 13 November 1987 (age 38) Kharkiv, Ukrainian SSR, Soviet Union (now Ukraine)
- Party: Servant of the People
- Other political affiliations: Strong Ukraine; Independent
- Education: Kharkiv National University of Radioelectronics; Ivan Kozhedub National Air Force University; Kharkiv National University of Internal Affairs

Military service
- Allegiance: Ukraine
- Branch/service: Ukrainian Air Force
- Rank: Junior lieutenant

Oleksiy Ihorovych Krasov (Ukrainian: Олексій Ігорович Красов; born 13 November 1987) is a Ukrainian politician currently serving as a People's Deputy of Ukraine from Ukraine's 180th electoral district since 29 August 2019. He is a member of Servant of the People.

== Early life and career ==
Oleksiy Ihorovych Krasov was born on 13 November 1987 in the city of Kharkiv, then within the Ukrainian Soviet Socialist Republic. He has graduated from three universities: the Kharkiv National University of Radioelectronics (specialising in software engineering), the Ivan Kozhedub National Air Force University, and the Kharkiv National University of Internal Affairs (specialising in law). He is a junior lieutenant in the Ukrainian Air Force.

Prior to his election, Krasov served as director of the real estate company Yarko Invest TOV. He additionally co-founded Saturn-6 TOV, a real estate management and construction company.

== Political career ==
Before joining Servant of the People, Krasov was a supporter of the Strong Ukraine political party. He led the party's branch in the Novobavarskyi District of Kharkiv, and mounted an unsuccessful campaign for the 10th district's seat in the Kharkiv City Council in the 2010 Ukrainian local elections.

In the 2019 Ukrainian parliamentary election Krasov ran to be a People's Deputy of Ukraine from Ukraine's 180th electoral district. He was the candidate of Servant of the People, and ultimately defeated incumbent People's Deputy Oleksandr Bilovol with 43.91% of the vote to Bilovol's 32.08%.

=== People's Deputy of Ukraine ===
Following his inauguration as a People's Deputy, Krasov joined the Servant of the People faction, and became a member of the Verkhovna Rada Committee on Anti-Corruption Policy. On 5 October 2022, he left the Committee on Anti-Corruption Policy to join the Committee on Energy and Housing and Communal Services. He is additionally a member of the Blockchain4Ukraine and Slobozhanshchyna inter-factional associations

Krasov was criticised by anti-corruption non-governmental organisation Chesno during the COVID-19 pandemic in Ukraine for personally giving personal protective equipment to medical facilities in what it regarded as an effort to convince individuals to vote for him.
