= Viktor Berko =

Ukrainian football forward

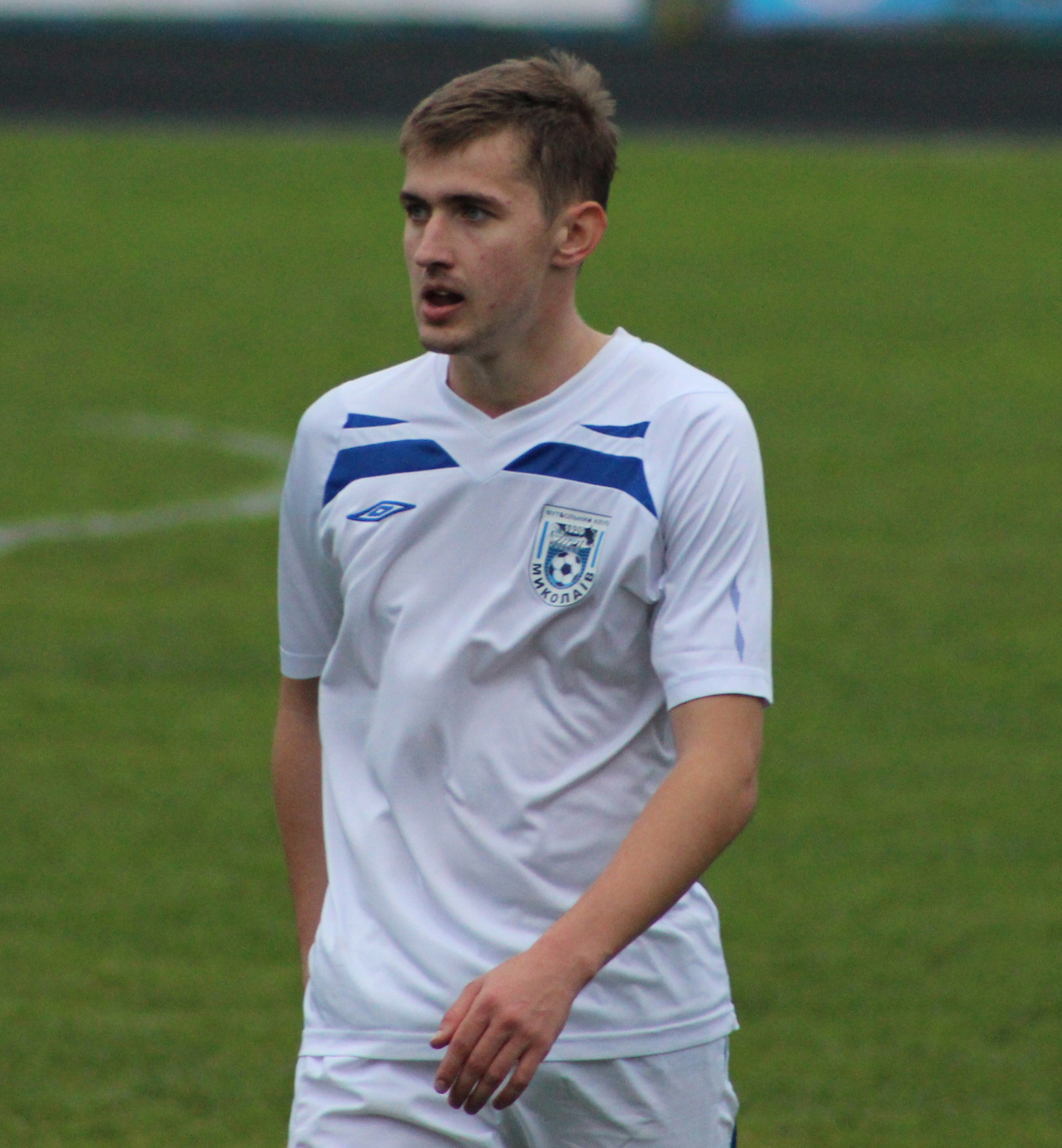

Personal information
- Full name: Viktor Yuriyovych Berko
- Date of birth: 21 September 1992 (age 34)
- Place of birth: Voznesensk, Ukraine
- Height: 1.78 m (5 ft 10 in)
- Position: Forward

Youth career
- 2006–2009: Zelenyi Hai Voznesensk

Senior career*
Years	Team	Apps	(Gls)
2009–2012	Zelenyi Hai Voznesensk		
2012–2019	Mykolaiv	217	(39)
2017–2019	→ Mykolaiv-2	6	(3)
2020	Hirnyk Kryvyi Rih	0	(0)
2020–2021	Kryvbas Kryvyi Rih	22	(9)
2021	Livyi Bereh Kyiv	13	(2)
2021	Vast Mykolaiv	4	(0)
2021	Kudrivka	11	(1)
- * Club domestic league appearances and goals as of 21 April 2025

Viktor Berko (Ukrainian: Віктор Юрійович Берко; born 21 September 1992) is a Ukrainian football forward who last played for Livyi Bereh Kyiv.

== Career ==
Berko is a product of FC Zelenyi Hai Voznesensk playing at the Ukrainian Youth Football League.

Until 2012 he stayed with his home team playing in regional competitions. After that Berko moved to the main football club of the region playing at professional level.

He debuted at professional level on 3 April 2012 in the game against FC Odesa which was tied at 0. His first goal he scored on 3 May 2012 in 2–4 loss against FC Helios Kharkiv. In summer 2023 he moved to Kudrivka and on 23 november 2023 he scored against Trostianetsin Ukrainian Second League.
