= Denys Vasin =

Ukrainian football forward (born 1989)

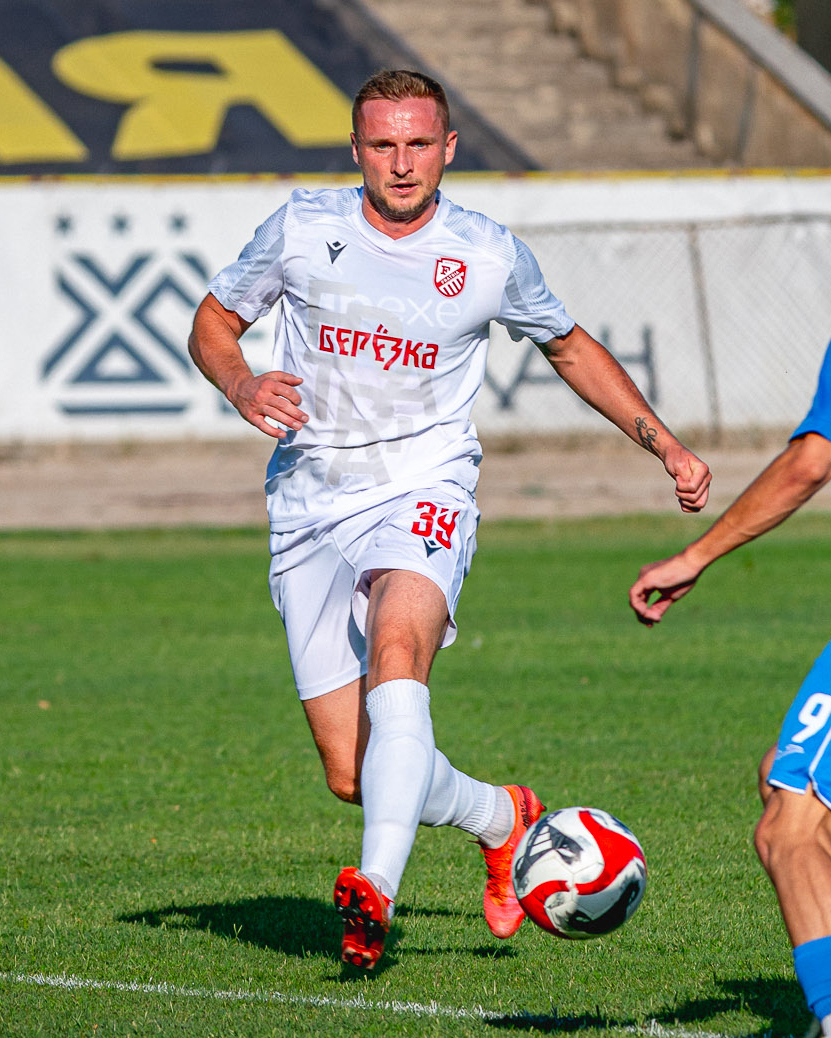
- Vasin captured while playing for Fratria in 2024.

Personal information
- Full name: Denys Hennadiyovych Vasin
- Date of birth: 4 March 1989 (age 37)
- Place of birth: Odesa, Ukrainian SSR, Soviet Union
- Height: 1.79 m (5 ft 10 1/2 in)
- Position: Forward

Team information
- Current team: Fratria Varna (sporting director)

Youth career
- 2004–2006: Chornomorets Odesa

Senior career*
Years	Team	Apps	(Gls)
2006–2013	Chornomorets Odesa	51	(10)
2013	→ Belshina Bobruisk (loan)	9	(3)
2013–2014	Karpaty Lviv	16	(0)
2014	Illichivets Mariupol	3	(0)
2015	Chornomorets Odesa	11	(0)
2016–2017	Stal Kamianske	47	(6)
2017	Chornomorets Odesa	13	(2)
2018–2021	Vorskla Poltava	47	(8)
2021	→ Inhulets Petrove (loan)	5	(0)
2021–2022	Kryvbas Kryvyi Rih	10	(1)
2022	→ Jonava (loan)	5	(0)
2023–2024	Fratria Varna	20	(13)
Total		237	(43)

International career^{‡}
2006	Ukraine U17	4	(1)
2006	Ukraine U18	4	(2)
2009–2011	Ukraine U21	3	(1)

Managerial career
- 2024–2025: Fratria Varna (assistant)
- 2026–: Fratria Varna II (caretaker)
- * Club domestic league appearances and goals as of 06:17, 26 August 2024 (UTC) ‡ National team caps and goals as of 3 February 2021

Denys Vasin (Ukrainian: Денис Геннадійович Васін; born 4 March 1989) is a Ukrainian retired football forward and now sporting director at Fratria Varna.

== Career ==
He played for Karpaty Lviv. He is the product of the Chornomorets Odesa Youth school system and has played for the reserve squad and youth squad since 2004–2005 season. Vasin also was a member of the Ukraine national under-21 football team.

In 2022 he moved to Lithuania and played for FK Jonava. On 16 April 2022 he made a debut in A Lyga against FC Džiugas. In June 2022 he left club.

In July 2023 he joined the newly promoted to Bulgarian Third League team Fratria Varna. He scored 2 goals in his league debut match on 13 August 2023 against Dorostol Silistra. He became top goalscorer of the team for 2023/24 season together with Vasil Andoni. On 3 September 2024 he announced his retirement. He became assistant coach to Vasil Petrov at Fratria in November 2024.
