= Erixon Danso =

Aruban footballer (born 1989)

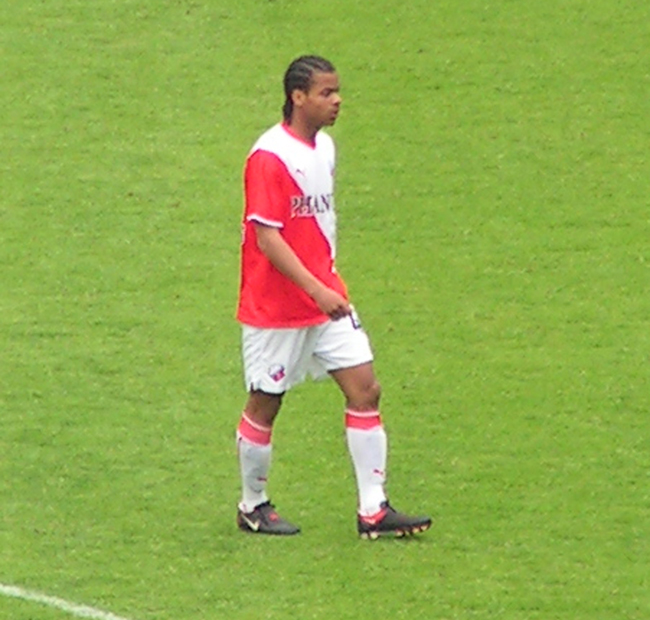
- Erixon Danso with FC Utrecht

Personal information
- Full name: Erixon Michiel Arnolf Danso
- Date of birth: 22 July 1989 (age 37)
- Place of birth: Amsterdam, Netherlands
- Height: 1.78 m (5 ft 10 in)
- Position: Winger

Youth career
- –2005: AFC
- 2005–2006: FC Omniworld
- 2006–2008: Ajax
- 2008–2009: Utrecht

Senior career*
Years	Team	Apps	(Gls)
2008–2011	Utrecht	19	(1)
2011–2012	Orihuela	3	(1)
2012–2013	Valencia B	14	(1)
2013–2014	Dordrecht	31	(13)
2014	Dordrecht	4	(0)
2015	Al Safa	4	(1)
2015–2016	Emmen	35	(14)
2016	Stal Kamianske	8	(0)
2017	Jerv	25	(2)
2018	Sandnes Ulf	26	(8)
2019	Egersund	16	(3)
Total		185	(44)

International career
2015–2018	Aruba	6	(2)
- * Club domestic league appearances and goals

Erixon Michiel Arnolf Danso (born 22 July 1989) is an Aruban retired footballer who played as a winger. He holds a Dutch passport.

== Club career ==
Danso was born in Amsterdam, and has his roots in Aruba. He played for AFC Ajax's youth squad, and was signed professionally by FC Utrecht.

Danso made his debut for Utrecht against SC Heerenveen on 19 April 2009, and scored his first league goal for the club on 18 April 2010 in a 3–0 win against Sparta Rotterdam.

After spending time in the Spanish second division, Danso returned to Holland when he signed up for FC Dordrecht in summer 2013. He was released for indiscipline after a season, but was rehired after an injury to Giovanni Korte.

He returned to Holland to play for FC Emmen in the 2015/16 season, after a spell in Lebanon with Al Safa. In summer 2016, Danso left Emmen to join former coach Joop Gall at Ukrainian side Stal Kamianske In February 2017 he moved to Norway to play for second division FK Jerv after failing to score in 8 games for Stal.

Danso joined Sandnes Ulf ahead of the 2018 season and left them at the end of that season. On 27 January 2019, he signed with Egersunds IK in the Norwegian 2. divisjon.

== Career statistics ==
=== International ===
Appearances and goals by national team and year
National team	Year	Apps	Goals
Aruba	2015	4	2
Aruba	2016	–	
Aruba	2017	–	
Aruba	2018	2	0
Total		6	2

Scores and results list Aruba's goal tally first, score column indicates score after each Danso goal.

List of international goals scored by Erixon Danso
No.	Date	Venue	Opponent	Score	Result	Competition
1	14 October 2012	Trinidad Stadium, Oranjestad, Aruba	Saint Vincent and the Grenadines	1–0	2–1	2018 FIFA World Cup qualification
2	14 October 2012	Trinidad Stadium, Oranjestad, Aruba	Saint Vincent and the Grenadines	2–0	2–1	2018 FIFA World Cup qualification
