= Valeriy Kucherov =

Ukrainian footballer (born 1993)

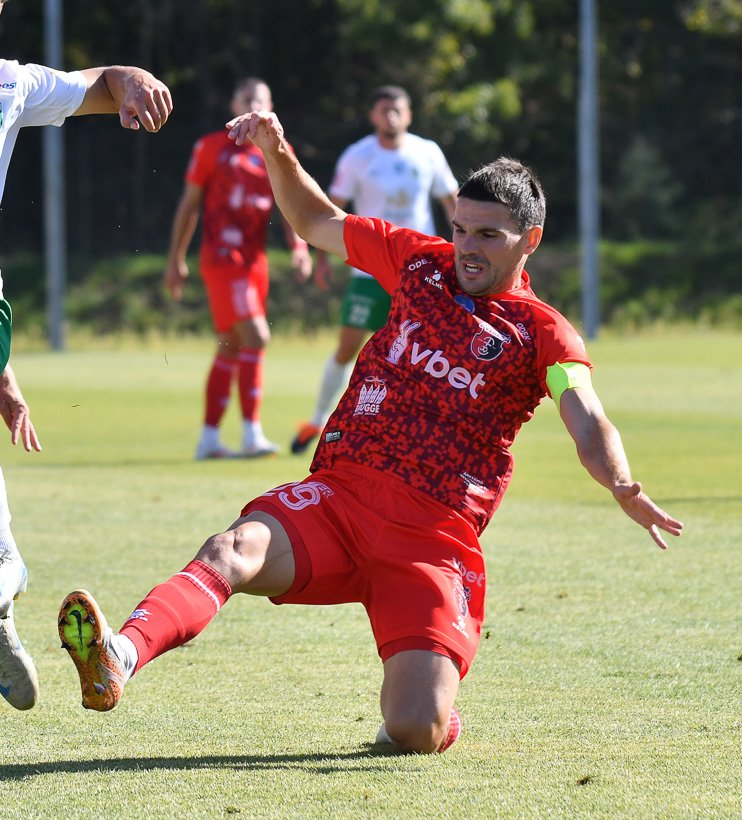

Personal information
- Full name: Valeriy Volodymyrovych Kucherov
- Date of birth: 11 August 1993 (age 33)
- Place of birth: Kadiivka, Ukraine
- Height: 1.75 m (5 ft 9 in)
- Position: Midfielder

Team information
- Current team: Feniks-Mariupol
- Number: 27

Youth career
- 2006–2010: Stal Alchevsk

Senior career*
Years	Team	Apps	(Gls)
2013	Stal Alchevsk	1	(0)
2013–2016	Stal Dniprodzerzhynsk	53	(3)
2016–2017	Veres Rivne	40	(0)
2018	Arsenal Kyiv	11	(0)
2018	Kalush	17	(0)
2019–2025	Veres Rivne	166	(7)
2026–	Feniks-Mariupol	12	(0)
- * Club domestic league appearances and goals as of 4 June 2026

Valeriy Volodymyrovych Kucherov (Ukrainian: Валерій Володимирович Кучеров; born 11 August 1993) is a Ukrainian professional footballer who plays as a midfielder for Feniks-Mariupol.

== Career ==
=== Club ===
Kucherov is a product of the FC Stal Alchevsk youth team system. In 2013, he signed a contract with FC Stal Dniprodzerzhynsk.

Kucherov made his debut in the Ukrainian Premier League for FC Stal in a game against FC Dynamo Kyiv on 19 July 2015.

In January 2018, Kucherov went on trial with Tajik League Champions Istiklol.
