= Meteor Stadium =

Multi-purpose stadium in Dnipro, Ukraine

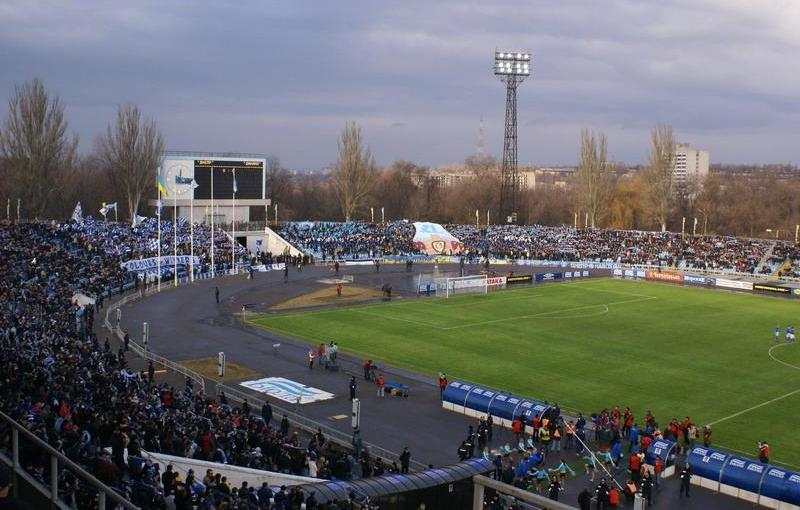
- Interactive map of Meteor Stadium
- Location: Dnipro, Ukraine
- Coordinates: 48°26′08″N 35°0′20″E
- Owner: State company "Yuzhmash"
- Operator: FC Dnipro
- Capacity: 24,381 (football); 120 (for VIP); 1038 (covered)
- Surface: Grass (drainage system, heated)
- Record attendance: 40,000 (1993, Dnipro-Dynamo)
- Field size: 105 m × 68 m (344 ft × 223 ft)

Construction
- Opened: 1966
- Renovated: 2001 (latest)

Tenants
- FC Dnipro (1966–2008); Ukraine (2005); FC Dnipro-75 Dnipropetrovsk (2008–2010); FC Dnipro-2 Dnipropetrovsk (2010–2012); FC Illichivets Mariupol (2014–2015); FC Stal Dniprodzerzhynsk (2015–2017)

Website
- Official website

Meteor Stadium (Ukrainian: Стадіон «Метеор») is a multi-purpose stadium in Dnipro, Ukraine. It is part of the Sports Complex Meteor and is a home of the Olympic and Paralympic teams of Ukraine with status national.

== Overview ==
It is used for various Olympic sports and football matches, and for quite some time was the home of FC Dnipro. The stadium can hold 24,381 people. It has lighting 1,200 lux.

The main city club FC Dnipro relocated to Dnipro Stadium (which was built in place of the old Metalurh Stadium) after a long spell at the Meteor in 1966-2008.

The stadium also has athletics tracks, a badminton hall with four courts, a wrestling hall, three tennis courts and two weightlifting rooms.

== History ==
The first football match was played on 30 August 1966 against Shinnik Yaroslavl which Dnipro won 3:1.

On 15 October 1981, a major tragedy took place after a game of the 1981 Soviet Top League between Dnipro and Spartak Moscow, after which 11 people died during a mass exit from the stadium.

== Games of the Ukraine national football team ==
Date	Type	Host	Score	Guest	Goals	Attendance
8 October 2005	FIFA World Cup Qual; UEFA Group 2	Ukraine	2 – 2	Albania	Andriy Shevchenko 45'; Erjon Bogdani 75'; Erjon Bogdani 83'; Ruslan Rotan 86'	24,000
