= Anton Kravchenko =

Ukrainian footballer

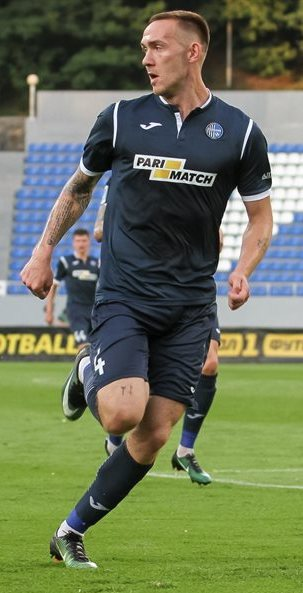

Personal information
- Full name: Anton Serhiyovych Kravchenko
- Date of birth: 23 March 1991 (age 35)
- Place of birth: Dnipropetrovsk, Ukrainian SSR
- Height: 1.87 m (6 ft 2 in)
- Position: Defender

Team information
- Current team: Standart Novi Sanzhary

Youth career
- 2005–2007: Dnipro Dnipropetrovsk

Senior career*
Years	Team	Apps	(Gls)
2007–2012	Dnipro Dnipropetrovsk	0	(0)
2011	→ Naftovyk-Ukrnafta Okhtyrka (loan)	32	(1)
2012	→ Volyn Lutsk (loan)	1	(0)
2013	Helios Kharkiv	19	(3)
2014	Tytan Armyansk	8	(1)
2014–2017	Stal Kamianske	54	(2)
2017	Olimpik Donetsk	16	(3)
2018	Kardemir Karabükspor	16	(0)
2018	Olimpik Donetsk	14	(1)
2019–2023	Kisvárda	61	(5)
2023–2024	Oleksandriya	11	(1)
2024–	Standart Novi Sanzhary		

International career^{‡}
2007–2008	Ukraine U17	7	(0)
2009–2010	Ukraine U19	12	(0)
- * Club domestic league appearances and goals as of 20 June 2024 ‡ National team caps and goals as of 10 September 2023

Anton Serhiyovych Kravchenko (Ukrainian: Антон Сергійович Кравченко; born 23 March 1991) is a Ukrainian professional footballer who plays as a defender for the amateur side Standart Novi Sanzhary.
