= Yevhen Budnik =

Ukrainian footballer

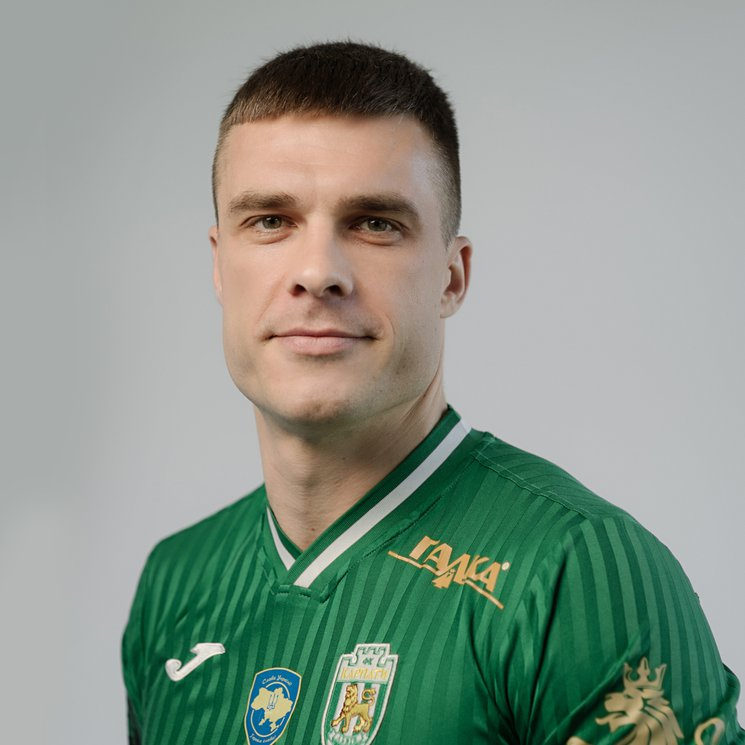

Personal information
- Full name: Yevhen Vitaliyovych Budnik
- Date of birth: 4 September 1990 (age 36)
- Place of birth: Lutsk, Soviet Union (now Ukraine)
- Height: 1.85 m (6 ft 1 in)
- Position: Centre-forward

Team information
- Current team: Krasava Ypsonas
- Number: 9

Youth career
- 2003–2007: Arsenal Kharkiv

Senior career*
Years	Team	Apps	(Gls)
2007–2009	Arsenal Kharkiv	26	(2)
2009–2012	Metalist Kharkiv	1	(1)
2012	→ Vorskla Poltava (loan)	7	(0)
2012–2016	Vorskla Poltava	34	(6)
2014	→ Slovan Liberec (loan)	11	(0)
2015–2016	→ Stal Dniprodzerzhynsk (loan)	18	(0)
2016	→ Dinamo Minsk (loan)	11	(3)
2017	Kapfenberger SV	16	(3)
2017–2018	Platanias	12	(1)
2018	Lamia	13	(0)
2019	Levadia Tallinn	14	(10)
2019–2020	Urartu	9	(4)
2020	Persita Tangerang	3	(0)
2021	Urartu	0	(0)
2021	→ Pyunik (loan)	9	(0)
2021–2022	Karpaty Lviv	15	(2)
2022	→ Asteras Vlachioti (loan)	8	(6)
2022–2023	Krasava Ypsonas	27	(11)
2023	Xylotymbou	12	(4)
2024	Omonia 29M	16	(3)
2024–	Krasava Ypsonas	58	(12)

International career
2011	Ukraine U21	1	(0)
- * Club domestic league appearances and goals as of 14 June 2026

Yevhen Vitaliyovych Budnik (Ukrainian: Євген Віталійович Буднік; born 4 September 1990) is a Ukrainian professional footballer who plays as a centre-forward for Krasava Ypsonas.

== Career ==
=== Arsenal Kharkiv ===
Budnik is a youth product of Arsenal Kharkiv and played for the club in the Ukrainian Second League.

=== Metalist Kharkiv ===
Budnik then moved to Metalist Kharkiv where he initially played for the reserves team. He went on to play 11 games and score 4 goals in the 2008–09 season. In the 2009–10 season he played 29 games, scoring 4 goals. The 2010–11 season was even more successful for Budnik, who was one of the top goalscorers of the season, with 13 goals in 25 games. Budnik was promoted to Metalist's main team for the 2011–12 season.

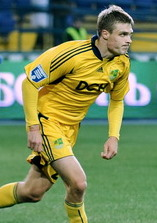
Budnik playing for Metalist Kharkiv in 2011

=== FCI Levadia ===
On 28 January 2019, Budnik signed a two-year contract with Estonian club FCI Levadia. He was released from the club in June 2019.

=== Pyunik ===
On 1 March 2021, Budnik signed for Pyunik from Urartu.
