= Mykola Ishchenko =

Ukrainian footballer

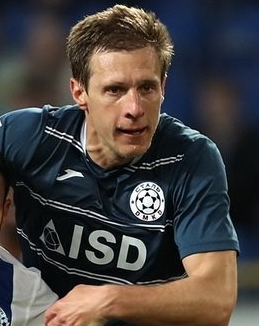

Personal information
- Full name: Mykola Anatoliyovych Ishchenko
- Date of birth: 9 March 1983 (age 43)
- Place of birth: Kyiv, Ukrainian SSR (now Ukraine)
- Height: 1.82 m (6 ft 0 in)
- Position: Defender

Team information
- Current team: Livyi Bereh Kyiv
- Number: 32

Youth career
- 1998–1999: Knyazha Shchaslyve
- 1999–2000: Youth Sportive School #15 Kyiv

Senior career*
Years	Team	Apps	(Gls)
2000–2008	Karpaty Lviv	124	(5)
2000–2004	→ Karpaty-2 Lviv	73	(0)
2001–2002	→ Karpaty-3 Lviv	12	(0)
2008–2014	Shakhtar Donetsk	35	(0)
2011–2014	→ Illichivets Mariupol (loan)	75	(0)
2015	Metalist Kharkiv	10	(0)
2015–2017	Stal Kamianske	42	(2)
2017	Veres Rivne	11	(0)
2018	Chornomorets Odesa	1	(0)
2021–	Livyi Bereh Kyiv	20	(0)

International career^{‡}
2003–2006	Ukraine U21	24	(0)
2011	Ukraine	1	(0)
Medal record
Men's football
Representing Ukraine
UEFA European Under-21 Championship
Runner-up	2006 Portugal
- * Club domestic league appearances and goals as of 9 October 2021 ‡ National team caps and goals as of 8 February 2018

Mykola Anatoliyovych Ishchenko (Ukrainian: Микола Анатолійович Іщенко; born 9 March 1983) is a Ukrainian footballer who plays for Livyi Bereh Kyiv.

== Career ==
After three seasons at FC Shakhtar Donetsk Ishchenko found it difficult to break through in the starting line up. The former captain of FC Karpaty Lviv was signed by FC Shakhtar Donetsk for $3.3 million transfer fee. He made his premier league debut against FC Lviv. Despite the 2–0 loss of Shakhtar, Ishchenko was voted man-of-the-match

He played for FC Metalist Kharkiv in the Ukrainian Premier League.

== Honours ==
=== Club ===
==== Shakhtar Donetsk ====
- Ukrainian Premier League: 2009–10, 2010–11
- Ukrainian Cup: 2010–11
- Ukrainian Super Cup: 2008, 2010
- UEFA Cup: 2008–09

=== International ===
==== Ukraine U21 ====
- UEFA European Under-21 Championship runner-up: 2006
