= Maksym Kalenchuk =

Ukrainian footballer (born 1989)

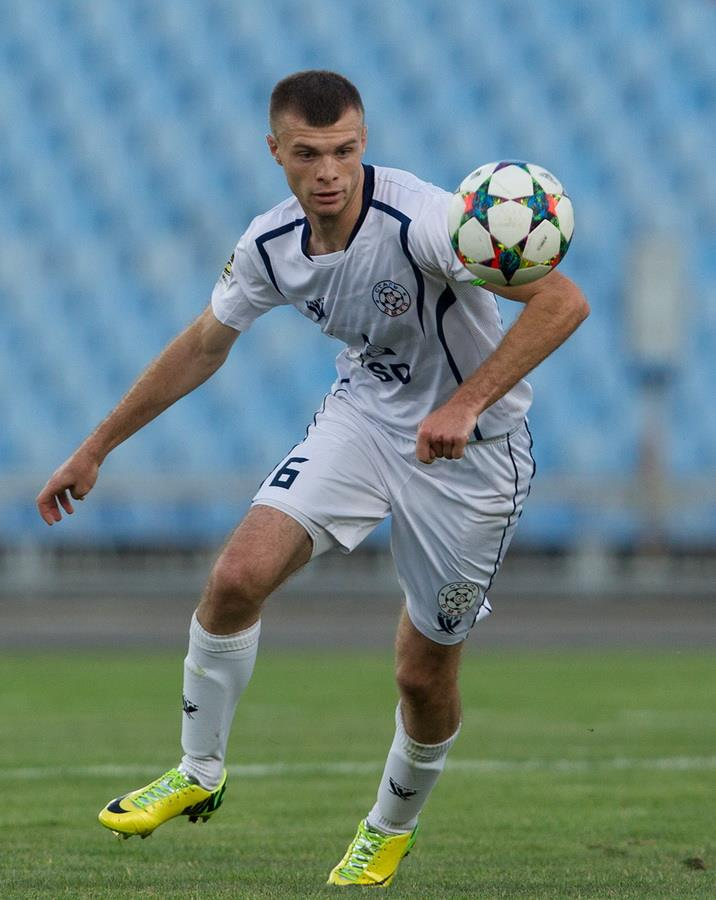

Personal information
- Full name: Maksym Mykolayovych Kalenchuk
- Date of birth: 5 December 1989 (age 36)
- Place of birth: Donetsk, Ukrainian SSR
- Height: 1.83 m (6 ft 0 in)
- Position: Midfielder

Youth career
- 2003–2004: Shakhtar Donetsk
- 2005–2007: UOR Donetsk

Senior career*
| Years | Team | Apps | (Gls) |
| 2009 | Tytan Donetsk | 12 | (0) |
| 2009 | Zirka Kirovohrad | 7 | (0) |
| 2010 | Slovkhlib Slovyansk | | |
| 2010 | Konti Kostyantynivka | | |
| 2011 | USK-Rubin Donetsk | | |
| 2011–2017 | Stal Kamianske | 149 | (16) |
| 2017 | Oleksandriya | 13 | (0) |
| 2018 | Veres Rivne | 12 | (0) |
| 2018 | Lviv | 11 | (0) |
| 2019 | Rukh Lviv | 7 | (0) |
| 2020–2021 | Vitebsk | 51 | (0) |
| 2022 | LNZ Cherkasy | 0 | (0) |
| 2022 | Akzhayik | 22 | (1) |
- * Club domestic league appearances and goals as of 31 December 2022

Maksym Mykolayovych Kalenchuk (Ukrainian: Максим Миколайович Каленчук; born 5 December 1989) is a Ukrainian professional footballer who plays as a midfielder.

== Honours ==
Akzhayik

- Kazakhstan Cup: runner-up: 2022
