= Roman Karasyuk =

Ukrainian footballer

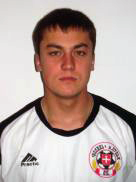

Personal information
- Full name: Roman Ivanovych Karasyuk
- Date of birth: 27 March 1991 (age 35)
- Place of birth: Volodymyr-Volynskyi, Ukrainian SSR
- Height: 1.84 m (6 ft 1/2 in)
- Position: Midfielder

Team information
- Current team: Tomasovia Tomaszów Lubelski

Youth career
- 2003–2008: BRW-BIK Volodymyr-Volynskyi

Senior career*
Years	Team	Apps	(Gls)
2008	BRW-BIK Volodymyr-Volynskyi	7	(0)
2008–2014	Volyn Lutsk	22	(0)
2013	→ Stal Alchevsk (loan)	12	(0)
2014–2017	Stal Kamianske	81	(3)
2017–2018	Veres Rivne	32	(1)
2018–2020	Kisvárda	61	(0)
2021–2022	Rukh Lviv	25	(0)
2022–2023	Pyunik	21	(0)
2023–2024	Michalovce	21	(0)
2024–2025	Orlęta Radzyń Podlaski	11	(0)
2025	Sygnał Lublin	15	(0)
2025–	Tomasovia Tomaszów Lubelski	0	(0)

International career
2007	Ukraine U17	3	(0)
2008–2009	Ukraine U18	9	(3)
2009–2010	Ukraine U19	11	(0)
- * Club domestic league appearances and goals as of 13:56, 7 August 2025 (UTC)

Roman Karasyuk (Ukrainian: Роман Іванович Карасюк; born 27 March 1991) is a Ukrainian professional footballer who plays as a defensive midfielder for IV liga Lublin club Tomasovia Tomaszów Lubelski.

== Career ==
Karasyuk began his playing career in sportive school in native town Volodymyr-Volynskyi. Than he joined to FC Volyn Lutsk team. He made his first team debut entering as a second-half substitute against FC Dynamo-2 Kyiv on 11 October 2008.

In 2008, Karasyuk was called up to the Ukraine national under-19 football team for a series of matches in preparation for the 2010 UEFA European Under-19 Championship.

== Honours ==
Pyunik

- Armenian Super Cup: 2022
