= Serhiy Voronin =

Ukrainian footballer (born 1987)

Personal information
- Full name: Serhiy Oleksandrovych Voronin
- Date of birth: 24 March 1987 (age 39)
- Place of birth: Kyiv, Ukrainian SSR, Soviet Union
- Height: 1.84 m (6 ft 0 in)
- Position: Defender

Team information
- Current team: Tygrys Huta Mińska
- Number: 5

Youth career
- 2001: Arsenal Kyiv
- 2002–2003: Dynamo Kyiv
- 2003–2004: Vidradnyi Kyiv

Senior career*
Years	Team	Apps	(Gls)
2004–2006	Dynamo Kyiv	0	(0)
2004–2006	→ Dynamo-3 Kyiv	28	(2)
2005	→ Dynamo-2 Kyiv	5	(0)
2006	→ CSKA Kyiv (loan)	5	(0)
2007–2008	Lechia Gdańsk	0	(0)
2008	Knyazha-2 Schaslyve	18	(1)
2009	Nafkom Brovary	9	(4)
2009–2010	Nyva Vinnytsia	38	(8)
2011–2014	Sevastopol	69	(1)
2012	→ Sevastopol-2	2	(0)
2014–2015	Volyn Lutsk	5	(0)
2015–2017	Stal Kamianske	34	(0)
2018	Sumy	9	(0)
2018–2019	Lviv	15	(2)
2019	Chornomorets Odesa	15	(0)
2020	Kryvbas Kryvyi Rih	0	(0)
2021–2022	Livyi Bereh Kyiv	10	(0)
2022–	Tygrys Huta Mińska	67	(8)

International career
2005	Ukraine U18	4	(0)
2005	Ukraine U19	1	(0)
- * Club domestic league appearances and goals as of 16:36, 30 June 2026 (UTC)

Serhiy Voronin (Ukrainian: Сергій Олександрович Воронін; born 24 March 1987) is a Ukrainian professional footballer who plays as a defender for Polish V liga Masovia club Tygrys Huta Mińska.

== Career ==
Voronin began his playing career with Dynamo Kyiv's third team. He joined different clubs from the Ukrainian Second and First Leagues. In 2007 he signed for Lechia Gdańsk on a free transfer. Voronin failed to make an appearance for Lechia during the 2007–08 season in which the team won promotion to the Ekstraklasa by winning the II liga. Voronin was available to leave on a free after Lechia's promotion and joined Knyazha-2 Schaslyve in the summer of 2008. In 2011, he signed a contract with Sevastopol in the Ukrainian Premier League. Voronin made his Premier League debut entering as a second-half substitute against Shakhtar Donetsk on 3 March 2011.

== Honours ==
Tygrys Huta Mińska

- V liga Masovia II: 2023–24
- Polish Cup (Siedlce regionals): 2022–23
