= 2017–18 FC Zirka Kropyvnytskyi season =

Zirka Kropyvnytskyi
2017-18 season
- President: Maksym Berezkin
- Manager: Roman Monaryov
- Stadium: Zirka Stadium
- Ukrainian Premier League: 10th (relegated)
- Ukrainian Cup: Round 3 (1/16)
- Top goalscorer: League: Maksym Pryadun (4); All: Maksym Pryadun (4)
Home colours	Away colours

The 2017–18 season was 8th season in the top Ukrainian football league for Zirka Kropyvnytskyi. Zirka competed in Premier League and Ukrainian Cup. After finishing at 10th place in Premier league, Zirka lost to Desna Chernihiv in play-offs and was relegated to First League.

== Players ==
=== Squad information ===
As of 31 May 2018

Squad no.	Name	Nationality	Position	Date of birth (age)
Goalkeepers
41	Roman Lyopka ^{List B}	(Ukraine)	GK	26 January 1997 (aged 21)
44	Yevhen Past	(Ukraine)	GK	16 March 1988 (aged 30)
Defenders
3	Julian Rullier	(France)	DF	4 April 1990 (aged 28)
5	Anton Bratkov	(Ukraine)	DF	14 May 1993 (aged 25)
9	Nazar Malinovskyi ^{List B}	(Ukraine)	DF	18 April 1998 (aged 20)
14	Mykyta Khodakovskyi ^{List B}	(Ukraine)	DF	18 October 1996 (aged 21)
16	Adel Gafaiti	(Algeria) (France)	DF	16 July 1994 (aged 23)
18	Vladyslav Veremeev ^{List B}	(Ukraine)	DF	25 September 1998 (aged 19)
19	Arman Hovhannisyan	(Armenia)	DF	7 July 1993 (aged 24)
20	Dmytro Fatyeyev	(Ukraine)	DF	21 June 1994 (aged 23)
23	Oleksandr Matkobozhyk ^{List B}	(Ukraine)	DF	3 January 1998 (aged 20)
45	Cécé Pepe ^{List B}	(France)	DF	9 November 1996 (aged 21)
55	Maksym Kovalyov	(Ukraine)	DF	20 March 1989 (aged 29)
93	Ivan Tsyupa	(Ukraine)	DF	25 June 1993 (aged 24)
Midfielders
7	Maksym Drachenko (Captain)	(Ukraine)	MF	28 January 1990 (aged 28)
8	Pavlo Polehenko	(Ukraine)	MF	6 January 1995 (aged 23)
10	Dmytro Bilonoh	(Ukraine)	MF	26 May 1995 (aged 23)
21	Ihor Zahalskyi	(Ukraine)	MF	19 May 1991 (aged 27)
22	Arnaud Guedj ^{List B}	(France)	MF	19 July 1997 (aged 20)
24	Maksym Averyanov ^{List B}	(Ukraine)	MF	22 July 1997 (aged 20)
27	Kyrylo Dryshlyuk ^{List B}	(Ukraine)	MF	16 September 1999 (aged 18)
90	Yaroslav Yampol	(Ukraine)	MF	21 April 1990 (aged 28)
94	Momar Bangoura	(France) (Senegal)	MF	24 February 1994 (aged 24)
Forwards
11	Hicham El Hamdaoui	(France)	FW	18 November 1995 (aged 22)
15	Oleksiy Zbun ^{List B}	(Ukraine)	FW	9 June 1997 (aged 20)
17	Artem Syomka ^{List B}	(Ukraine)	FW	18 February 1998 (aged 20)
28	Vyacheslav Panfilov	(Ukraine)	FW	24 June 1993 (aged 24)
29	Maksym Pryadun ^{List B}	(Ukraine)	FW	17 February 1997 (aged 21)
31	Danylo Kondrakov ^{List B}	(Ukraine)	FW	19 January 1998 (aged 20)
33	Gleb Rassadkin	(Belarus)	FW	5 April 1995 (aged 23)
38	Serhiy Petrov ^{List B}	(Ukraine)	FW	21 May 1997 (aged 21)
77	Oleksiy Chychykov	(Ukraine)	FW	30 September 1987 (aged 30)
81	Oleksandr Tarasyuk ^{List B}	(Ukraine)	FW	9 May 1998 (aged 20)
	Yaroslav Dovhyi ^{List B}	(Ukraine)	FW	20 February 1998 (aged 20)

== Transfers ==
=== In ===
Date	Pos.	Player	Age	Moving from	Type	Fee	Source
Summer
26 June 2017	DF	(Armenia) Arman Hovhannisyan	23	(Armenia) Shirak Gyumri	Transfer	Undisclosed	
2 July 2017	MF	(France) Arnaud Guedj	19	(France) Nice	Transfer	Undisclosed	
10 July 2017	FW	(Ukraine) Vyacheslav Panfilov	24	Unattached	Transfer	Free	
21 July 2017	FW	(Ukraine) Danylo Kondrakov	19	(Ukraine) Skala Stryi	Transfer	Undisclosed	
23 July 2017	MF	(Spain) Marc Castells	27	(Spain) Hospitalet	Transfer	Undisclosed	
4 August 2017	DF	(France) Cécé Pepe	21	(France) Marseille B	Transfer	Undisclosed	
4 August 2017	DF	(Ukraine) Ivan Tsyupa	24	(Ukraine) FC Mariupol	Transfer	Free	
9 August 2017	FW	(France) Hicham El Hamdaoui	21	(Belgium) Tertre-Hautrage	Transfer	Undisclosed	
30 August 2017	FW	(Belarus) Gleb Rassadkin	22	(Belarus) Dinamo Minsk	Transfer	Free	
29 September 2017	FW	(Ukraine) Serhiy Petrov	20	(Ukraine) Volyn Lutsk	Transfer	Free	
1 July 2017	FW	(Ukraine) Artem Favorov	23	(Denmark) Vejle Boldklub	Loan return		
10 July 2017	DF	(Ukraine) Taras Kacharaba	22	(Ukraine) Shakhtar Donetsk	Loan		
Winter
27 January 2018	DF	(Ukraine) Anton Bratkov	24	(Ukraine) Desna Chernihiv	Transfer	Undisclosed	
9 February 2018	FW	(Ukraine) Yaroslav Dovhyi	19	(Ukraine) FC Oleksandriya	Transfer	Free	
14 February 2018	MF	(Ukraine) Dmytro Bilonoh	22	(Russia) Ural Yekaterinburg	Transfer	Free	
15 February 2018	MF	(Ukraine) Yaroslav Yampol	27	(Ukraine) PFC Sumy	Transfer	Free	
2 March 2018	DF	(France) Julian Rullier	27	Unattached	Transfer	Free	
14 March 2018	DF	(Algeria) Adel Gafaiti	23	(France) Toulouse Rodéo	Transfer	Free	
14 March 2018	MF	(France) Momar Bangoura	24	Unattached	Transfer	Free	
1 January 2018	FW	(Ukraine) Aderinsola Habib Eseola	26	(Ukraine) Arsenal Kyiv	Loan return		

=== Out ===
Date	Pos.	Player	Age	Moving to	Type	Fee	Source
Summer
7 June 2017	DF	(Ukraine) Andriy Batsula	25	(Ukraine) FC Oleksandriya	Transfer	Undisclosed	
20 June 2017	MF	(Ukraine) Artem Schedryi	24	(Ukraine) FC Oleksandriya	Transfer	Undisclosed	
20 June 2017	DF	(Ukraine) Artem Sitalo	27	(Ukraine) FC Oleksandriya	Transfer	Undisclosed	
23 June 2017	DF	(Argentina) Federico Pereyra	28	(Ukraine) Karpaty Lviv	Transfer	Free	
29 June 2017	FW	(Ukraine) Oleksandr Akymenko	31	(Ukraine) Inhulets Petrove	Transfer	Free	
1 July 2017	MF	(Ukraine) Ihor Chenakal	20	(Ukraine) FC Lviv	Transfer	Free	
13 July 2017	MF	(Ukraine) Roman Popov	21	(Ukraine) MFC Mykolaiv	Transfer	Free	
14 July 2017	MF	(Ukraine) Vladyslav Lupashko	30	(Ukraine) Inhulets Petrove	Transfer	Free	
24 August 2017	DF	(Moldova) Oleksandr Kucherenko	25	(Ukraine) Inhulets Petrove	Transfer	Free	
1 July 2017	MF	(Ukraine) Mykyta Zhukov	22	(Ukraine) Inhulets Petrove	Loan return		
1 July 2017	MF	(Ukraine) Dmytro Bilonoh	22	(Russia) Ural Yekaterinburg	Loan return		
1 July 2017	DF	(Brazil) Nailson	23	(Portugal) Famalicão	Loan return		
31 August 2017	FW	(Ukraine) Aderinsola Habib Eseola	26	(Ukraine) Arsenal Kyiv	Loan		
Winter
12 January 2018	MF	(Spain) Marc Castells	27	(Spain) Castellón	Transfer	Free	
13 January 2018	MF	(Ukraine) Oleksandr Zozulya	21	Unattached	Transfer	Free	
28 January 2018	MF	(Ukraine) Artem Favorov	23	(Ukraine) Desna Chernihiv	Transfer	Free	
23 January 2018	MF	(Brazil) Bruno Vieira de Souza	20	(Lithuania) Atlantas Klaipėda	Transfer	Free	
19 January 2018	FW	(Ukraine) Aderinsola Habib Eseola	26	(Kazakhstan) Akzhayik	Loan		
31 January 2018	DF	(Ukraine) Taras Kacharaba	23	(Ukraine) Shakhtar Donetsk	Loan return		

== Pre-season and friendlies ==
26 June 2017 Friendly	Zirka Kropyvnytskyi (Ukraine)	3–1	(Ukraine) Kirovohrad Oblast team	Kropyvnytskyi
17:00 EEST (UTC+03:00)	Drachenko 45'; Eseola 70' (pen.); Chychykov 83'	Report	62'	Stadium: Zirka Stadium; Attendance: 100; Referee: Viktor Kopiyevskyi

2 July 2017 Friendly	Veres Rivne (Ukraine)	5–1	(Ukraine) Zirka Kropyvnytskyi	Uzhhorod
17:00 EEST (UTC+03:00)	Stepanyuk 54', 91'; Hennadiy Pasich 60'; Kotlyar 80'; Yevhen Pasich 84'	Report	48'	Stadium: HC "Kamelot"

5 July 2017 Friendly	MFC Mykolaiv (Ukraine)	3–4	(Ukraine) Zirka Kropyvnytskyi	Uzhhorod
11:30 EEST (UTC+03:00)	33'; 37'; 52'	Report	Pryadun 43'; Favorov 73'; Eseola 77'; 90+1'	Stadium: HC "Kamelot"

5 July 2017 Friendly	Balmazújvárosi FC (Hungary)	1–1	(Ukraine) Zirka Kropyvnytskyi	Uzhhorod
16:30 EEST (UTC+03:00)	68'	Report	Eseola 38'	Stadium: HC "Kamelot"; Attendance: 60

8 July 2017 Friendly	Volyn Lutsk (Ukraine)	0–2	(Ukraine) Zirka Kropyvnytskyi	Uzhhorod
18:00 EEST (UTC+03:00)		Report	Eseola 19', 44'	Stadium: HC "Kamelot"

3 September 2017 Friendly	Motor Zaporizhia (Ukraine)	0–2	(Ukraine) Zirka Kropyvnytskyi	Nikopol
17:00 EEST (UTC+03:00)		Report	Drachenko 37' (pen.); 86' (o.g.)	Stadium: GK Obriy Stadium; Attendance: 50

26 January 2018 Prydniprovya Cup	Zorya Luhansk U-21 (Ukraine)	1–2	(Ukraine) Zirka Kropyvnytskyi	Chkalove
13:00 EET (UTC+02:00)	Zahoruyko 85'	Report	Zahalskyi 29' (pen.); 75' (pen.)	Stadium: Kolos Stadium; Attendance: 50; Referee: Rostyslav Dubyna

29 January 2018 Prydniprovya Cup	MFC Metalurh Zaporizhya (Ukraine)	0–3	(Ukraine) Zirka Kropyvnytskyi	Chkalove
13:00 EET (UTC+02:00)		Report	Chychykov 26'; Drachenko 32' (pen.); 74'	Stadium: Kolos Stadium; Attendance: 50; Referee: Artem Ochkurenko

1 February 2018 Prydniprovya Cup	Victoriya Mykolayivka (Ukraine)	1–1	(Ukraine) Zirka Kropyvnytskyi	Chkalove
13:30 EET (UTC+02:00)	Shevchenko 4'	Report	31' (pen.)	Stadium: Kolos Stadium; Attendance: 50; Referee: Andriy Ryzhiy

2 February 2018 Exhibition game	FC Nikopol (Ukraine)	1–5	(Ukraine) Zirka Kropyvnytskyi	Nikopol
14:30 EET (UTC+02:00)	Voronin 85' (pen.)	Report	7'; Chychykov 35'; Kondrakov 58'; 71'; Pryadun 76'	Stadium: Obriy Stadium; Attendance: 50

5 February 2018 Prydniprovya Cup	Myr Hornostayivka (Ukraine)	1–1	(Ukraine) Zirka Kropyvnytskyi	Dnipro
12:00 EET (UTC+02:00)	Boyko 84'	Report	Zahalskyi 73'	Stadium: Molodizhnyi Park Stadium

11 February 2018 Exhibition game	Arsenal Kyiv (Ukraine)	2–2	(Ukraine) Zirka Kropyvnytskyi	Shchaslyve
14:00 EET (UTC+02:00)	Bushman 49'; Derkach 84'	Report	69'; Kondrakov 73'	Stadium: Arsenal train base Attendance: 50

== Competitions ==
=== Overall ===
Competition	First match	Last match	Starting round	Final position	Record							
Competition	First match	Last match	Starting round	Final position	Pld	W	D	L	GF	GA	GD	Win %
Premier League	16 July 2017	27 May 2018	Matchday 1	Relegation play-off (10th)	34	7	11	16	23	45	−22	20.59
Cup	20 September 2017	20 September 2017	Round 3 (1/16)	Round 3 (1/16)	1	0	0	1	2	3	−1	0.00
Total					35	7	11	17	25	48	−23	20.00

Last updated: 27 May 2018
Source: Competitions

=== Premier League ===
==== League table ====
Pos	Team	Pld	W	D	L	GF	GA	GD	Pts	Qualification or relegation
8	Karpaty Lviv	32	8	13	11	28	45	−17	37	
9	Olimpik Donetsk	32	9	9	14	29	38	−9	36	
10	Zirka Kropyvnytskyi (R)	32	7	10	15	22	40	−18	31	Qualification for the Relegation play-offs
11	Chornomorets Odesa (Z)	32	6	11	15	26	49	−23	29	Qualification for the Relegation play-offs
12	Stal Kamianske (R, X)	32	6	8	18	23	44	−21	26	Relegated and later withdrawn

Source: Ukrainian Premier League (in Ukrainian), UEFA, Soccerway
Rules for classification: 1) Points; 2) Goal difference; 3) Goals scored; 4) Head-to-head points; 5) Head-to-head goal difference; 6) Head-to-head goals scored; 7) Draw.
(R) Relegated; (X) Withdrew; (Z) Readmitted in after withdrawal of FC Poltava. see 2017–18 Ukrainian Premier League #Relegation play-offs for more information.

Team 1	Agg.	Team 2	1st leg	2nd leg
Zirka Kropyvnytskyi	1–5	Desna Chernihiv	1–1	0–4
Chornomorets Odesa	1–3	FC Poltava	1–0	0–3 (a.e.t.)

==== Results summary ====
Overall								Home						Away					
Pld	W	D	L	GF	GA	GD	Pts	W	D	L	GF	GA	GD	W	D	L	GF	GA	GD
32	7	10	15	22	40	−18	31	5	5	6	13	18	−5	2	5	9	9	22	−13

Last updated: 19 May 2018.
Source: Competitive matches

==== Results by round ====
Round	1	2	3	4	5	6	7	8	9	10	11	12	13	14	15	16	17	18	19	20	21	22	23	24	25	26	27	28	29	30	31	32
Ground	A	H	A	H	A	H	A	H	A	H	A	H	A	H	A	H	A	H	A	H	A	H	H	A	H	A	H	A	H	A	H	A
Result	D	D	L	L	L	W	W	L	L	L	D	D	L	W	D	L	L	W	D	L	L	D	L	W	D	L	W	D	W	L	D	L
Position	5	6	8	11	11	9	8	8	8	9	9	8	10	8	8	10	10	9	9	9	10	9	9	9	9	10	10	10	10	10	10	10

Updated to match(es) played on 19 May 2018. Source: Competitive matches
A = Away; H = Home; W = Win; D = Draw; L = Loss

==== Matches ====
16 July 2017 1	Karpaty Lviv	1–1	Zirka Kropyvnytskyi	Lviv
17:00 EEST (UTC+03:00)	Chachua 5'; Miroshnichenko (yellow card) 87'; Nesterov (yellow card) 90+4'	Report	Zahalskyi 37' (pen.); Pryadun (yellow card) 79'	Stadium: Ukraina Stadium; Attendance: 7,520; Referee: Mykola Kryvonosov

22 July 2017 2	Zirka Kropyvnytskyi	0–0	Olimpik Donetsk	Kropyvnytskyi
19:30 EEST (UTC+03:00)	Hovhannisyan (yellow card) 53'; Zahalskyi (yellow card) 87'; Eseola (yellow card) 90+2'	Report	Shabanov (yellow card) 45+1'; Lukyanchuk (yellow card) 73'; Moha (yellow card) 87'; Kravchenko (yellow card) 90+2'	Stadium: Zirka Stadium; Attendance: 2,542; Referee: Anatoliy Abdula

29 July 2017 3	Vorskla Poltava	2–1	Zirka Kropyvnytskyi	Poltava
19:30 EEST (UTC+03:00)	Hovhannisyan 19' (o.g.); Perduta (yellow card) 81'; Zahorulko 85'	Report	Drachenko 25', (yellow card) 65'; Eseola (yellow card) 77'; Panfilov (yellow card) 90+3'	Stadium: Vorskla Stadium; Attendance: 1,500; Referee: Dmytro Bondarenko

6 August 2017 4	Zirka Kropyvnytskyi	1–3	Veres Rivne	Kropyvnytskyi
19:30 EEST (UTC+03:00)	Zahalskyi 30', (yellow card) 85'; Kacharaba (yellow card) 43' (yellow-red card) 81'; Pryadun (yellow card) 45'; Polehenko (yellow card) 67'; Chychykov (yellow card) 90'	Report	Ischenko (yellow card) 28'; Adamyuk (yellow card) 42'; Siminin 45+1'; Fedorchuk (yellow card) 58'; Voloshynovych 83'; Serhiychuk 90+2'	Stadium: Zirka Stadium; Attendance: 1,770; Referee: Ihor Paskhal

11 August 2017 5	Dynamo Kyiv	3–0	Zirka Kropyvnytskyi	Kyiv
19:00 EEST (UTC+03:00)	Mbokani 48'; Yarmolenko 76' (pen.), 79'; Shepelyev (yellow card) 86'	Report	Tsyupa (yellow card) 42'	Stadium: NSC Olimpiyskiy; Attendance: 7,461; Referee: Vitaliy Romanov

20 August 2017 6	Zirka Kropyvnytskyi	2–1	Zorya Luhansk	Kropyvnytskyi
17:00 EEST (UTC+03:00)	El Hamdaoui 21', (yellow card) 53'; Pryadun 30'; Kovalyov (yellow card) 38'; Guedj (yellow card) 73'	Report	Hromov 19'; Kharatin (yellow card) 50'; Checher (yellow card) 52'	Stadium: Zirka Stadium; Attendance: 2,153; Referee: Denys Shurman

26 August 2017 7	Stal Kamianske	0–1	Zirka Kropyvnytskyi	Kyiv
17:00 EEST (UTC+03:00)	Gor Malakyan (yellow card) 73'; Danielyan (yellow card) 73'; Klymchuk (yellow card) 73'; Penkov (yellow card) 84'	Report	Pryadun 36'; Kovalyov (yellow card) 45+2'; Drachenko (yellow card) 73'	Stadium: Obolon Arena; Attendance: 525; Referee: Mykola Balakin

10 September 2017 8	Zirka Kropyvnytskyi	0–1	Chornomorets Odesa	Kropyvnytskyi
14:00 EEST (UTC+03:00)	Drachenko (yellow card) 23'; Cécé Pepe (yellow card) 54'; Tsyupa (yellow card) 69'	Report	Vasin 36'; Bamba (yellow card) 44'; Khoblenko (yellow card) 60'; Žunić (yellow card) 63'; Zubeyko (yellow card) 87'	Stadium: Zirka Stadium; Attendance: 2,454; Referee: Dmytro Kutakov

16 September 2017 9	FC Mariupol	1–0	Zirka Kropyvnytskyi	Mariupol
17:00 EEST (UTC+03:00)	Fomin 17'; Nasonov (yellow card) 43'; Rudyka (yellow card) 58'	Report	Drachenko (yellow card) 18'; Cécé Pepe (yellow card) 40'; El Hamdaoui (yellow card) 90+2'	Stadium: Illichivets Stadium; Attendance: 3,375; Referee: Mykola Kryvonosov

23 September 2017 10	Zirka Kropyvnytskyi	2–4	Shakhtar Donetsk	Kropyvnytskyi
14:00 EEST (UTC+03:00)	Zahalskyi (yellow card) 22'; El Hamdaoui 38', (yellow card) 57'; Pryadun (yellow card) 61'; Rassadkin 76', (yellow card) 87'; Polehenko (yellow card) 86'	Report	Ferreyra 12', 45'; Marlos 44'; Rakitskiy (yellow card) 47'; Stepanenko (yellow card) 57'; Ordets (yellow card) 66'; Petryak (yellow card) 85'; Kovalenko 90+4'	Stadium: Zirka Stadium; Attendance: 3,596; Referee: Yevhen Aranovsky

30 September 2017 11	Oleksandriya	0–0	Zirka Kropyvnytskyi	Oleksandriya
17:00 EEST (UTC+03:00)		Report	Kacharaba (yellow card) 18'; Guedj (yellow card) 67'; Tsyupa (yellow card) 72'	Stadium: CSC Nika Stadium; Attendance: 1,810; Referee: Dmytro Bondarenko

15 October 2017 12	Zirka Kropyvnytskyi	0–0	Karpaty Lviv	Kropyvnytskyi
14:00 EEST (UTC+03:00)	Kacharaba (yellow card) 76'; Drachenko (yellow card) 85'; Pryadun (yellow card) 88'; Petrov (yellow card) 90+2'	Report	Myakushko (yellow card) 28'; Holodyuk (yellow card) 44'	Stadium: Zirka Stadium; Attendance: 1,788; Referee: Denys Shurman

21 October 2017 13	Olimpik Donetsk	1–0	Zirka Kropyvnytskyi	Kyiv
14:00 EEST (UTC+03:00)	Shabanov (yellow card) 61'; Kravchenko (yellow card) 65'; Polehenko 90' (o.g.)	Report	Drachenko (yellow card) 18'; Kacharaba (yellow card) 29'; Favorov (yellow card) 37' (yellow-red card) 59'; Kovalyov (red card) 38'	Stadium: Dynamo Stadium; Attendance: 200; Referee: Yevhen Aranovsky

29 October 2017 14	Zirka Kropyvnytskyi	1–0	Vorskla Poltava	Kropyvnytskyi
14:00 EET (UTC+02:00)	Pryadun (yellow card) 9'; Chychykov 19'; Cécé Pepe (yellow card) 23'; Hovhannisyan (yellow card) 88'	Report	Chyzhov (yellow card) 11'	Stadium: Zirka Stadium; Attendance: 1,467; Referee: Ivan Bondar

4 November 2017 15	Veres Rivne	0–0	Zirka Kropyvnytskyi	Lviv
14:00 EET (UTC+02:00)	Siminin (yellow card) 80'; Adamyuk (yellow card) 90+3'	Report	Petrov (yellow card) 34'; Kacharaba (yellow card) 45+2'; Drachenko (yellow card) 85'	Stadium: Ukraina Stadium; Attendance: 710; Referee: Dmytro Bondarenko

18 November 2017 16	Zirka Kropyvnytskyi	0–2	Dynamo Kyiv	Kropyvnytskyi
14:00 EET (UTC+02:00)		Report	Khacheridi (yellow card) 7'; Mbokani 23', 31'	Stadium: Zirka Stadium; Attendance: 3,755; Referee: Oleksandr Derdo

26 November 2017 17	Zorya Luhansk	1–0	Zirka Kropyvnytskyi	Zaporizhia
19:30 EET (UTC+02:00)	Sukhotskyi (yellow card) 39'; Hromov 58'; Checher (yellow card) 69'	Report	Matkobozhyk (yellow card) 77'	Stadium: Slavutych-Arena; Attendance: 1,627; Referee: Mykola Balakin

3 December 2017 18	Zirka Kropyvnytskyi	1–0	Stal Kamianske	Kropyvnytskyi
14:00 EET (UTC+03:00)	Guedj (yellow card) 28' (yellow-red card) 31'; Polehenko (yellow card) 36'; Kacharaba (yellow card) 60'; Zahalskyi (yellow card) 67'; Tsyupa 78'; Dryshlyuk (yellow card) 90+2'; Past (yellow card) 90+4'	Report	Ulyanov (yellow card) 36' (yellow-red card) 76'; Mykhaylychenko (yellow card) 67'; Edgar Malakyan (yellow card) 67'; Tymchyk (yellow card) 82'; Khotsyanovskyi (yellow card) 89'; Danielyan (yellow card) 89'	Stadium: Zirka Stadium; Attendance: 954; Referee: Volodymyr Novokhatniy

9 December 2017 19	Chornomorets Odesa	3–3	Zirka Kropyvnytskyi	Odesa
14:00 EET (UTC+02:00)	Bamba (yellow card) 10', (goal) 57'; Kovalets (yellow card) 25'; Khoblenko 43', 90' (pen.), (yellow card) 86' (yellow-red card) 90+3'; Wagué (yellow card) 45+3'; Martynenko (yellow card) 53'; Zubeyko (yellow card) 70'	Report	Dryshlyuk (yellow card) 27'; Favorov (yellow card) 45+3'; Chychykov 51'; Pryadun 83', 88'; Petrov (yellow card) 89'; Drachenko (yellow card) 90'	Stadium: Chornomorets Stadium; Attendance: 4,246; Referee: Ihor Paskhal

18 February 2018 20	Zirka Kropyvnytskyi	0–3	FC Mariupol	Kropyvnytskyi
14:00 EET (UTC+02:00)		Report	Boryachuk 9', 26', 57'; Dedechko (yellow card) 32'; Bolbat (yellow card) 57'	Stadium: Zirka Stadium; Attendance: 1,432; Referee: Yaroslav Kozyk

25 February 2018 21	Shakhtar Donetsk	5–0	Zirka Kropyvnytskyi	Kharkiv
17:00 EET (UTC+02:00)	Ferreyra 14', 45'; Kovalenko 18'; Marlos 21', 43', (yellow card) 90+1'; Khocholava (yellow card) 63'; Taison (yellow card) 71'; Fred (yellow card) 76'	Report	Matkobozhyk (yellow card) 32'; Petrov (yellow card) 35'; Zahalskyi (yellow card) 56'; Tsyupa (yellow card) 60'; Dryshlyuk (yellow card) 74'	Stadium: Metalist OSC; Attendance: 1,517; Referee: Denys Shurman

6 March 2018 22	Zirka Kropyvnytskyi	0–0	FC Oleksandriya	Kropyvnytskyi
14:00 EET (UTC+02:00)	Drachenko (yellow card) 44'; Bilonoh (yellow card) 66'	Report	Hrytsuk (yellow card) 9'; Bukhal (yellow card) 82'; Banada (yellow card) 90+3'	Stadium: Zirka Stadium; Attendance: 1,141; Referee: Maksym Kozyryatskyi

10 March 2018 23	Zirka Kropyvnytskyi	1–2	Stal Kamianske	Kropyvnytskyi
14:00 EET (UTC+03:00)	Guedj (yellow card) 24'; Tsyupa 53'; Zahalskyi (yellow card) 90+2'; Bratkov (yellow card) 90+2'	Report	Meskhi (yellow card) 34'; Kuzyk 37'; Yakymiv (yellow card) 38'; Johnathan 45', (yellow card) 52'; Hrachov (yellow card) 90+2'	Stadium: Zirka Stadium; Attendance: 1,018; Referee: Ivan Bondar

17 March 2018 24	Olimpik Donetsk	0–1	Zirka Kropyvnytskyi	Kyiv
17:00 EET (UTC+03:00)	Zakharkiv (yellow card) 69'; Makharadze (yellow card) 90'	Report	Fatyeyev (yellow card) 56'; Ochigava 60' (o.g.); Rullier (yellow card) 64'; Zahalskyi (yellow card) 89'; Guedj (yellow card) 90'	Stadium: Dynamo Stadium; Attendance: 150; Referee: Volodymyr Milanych

31 March 2018 25	Zirka Kropyvnytskyi	0–0	FC Oleksandriya	Kropyvnytskyi
14:00 EEST (UTC+03:00)	Zahalskyi (yellow card) 5'; Averyanov (yellow card) 57'	Report	Dovhyi (yellow card) 63'	Stadium: Zirka Stadium; Attendance: 1,585; Referee: Denys Shurman

9 April 2018 26	Karpaty Lviv	2–1	Zirka Kropyvnytskyi	Lviv
14:00 EEST (UTC+03:00)	Hutsulyak 23'; Erbes (yellow card) 37'; Lobay (yellow card) 45+2' (yellow-red card) 54'; Myakushko 65'; Holodyuk (yellow card) 88'	Report	Hovhannisyan (yellow card) 29' (yellow-red card) 59'; Tsyupa (yellow card) 45+1' (yellow-red card) 74'; Guedj (yellow card) 45+2'; Bilonoh 50'; Drachenko (yellow card) 76'	Stadium: Ukraina Stadium; Attendance: 2,715; Referee: Ihor Paskhal

15 April 2018 27	Zirka Kropyvnytskyi	2–1	Chornomorets Odesa	Kropyvnytskyi
17:00 EEST (UTC+03:00)	Zbun (yellow card) 2'; Bilonoh 63', 79'	Report	Tretyakov (yellow card) 25'; Romanyuk (yellow card) 47' (yellow-red card) 74'; Tatarkov (yellow card) 54'; Chorniy 90+2'	Stadium: Zirka Stadium; Attendance: 1,722; Referee: Dmytro Kutakov

21 April 2018 28	Stal Kamianske	1–1	Zirka Kropyvnytskyi	Kyiv
14:00 EEST (UTC+03:00)	Kuzyk 57' (pen.); Johnathan (yellow card) 63'; Kostenko (yellow card) 79'	Report	Gafaiti (yellow card) 21'; Tsyupa (yellow card) 44' (yellow-red card) 54'; Petrov (yellow card) 47', (goal) 50'	Stadium: Obolon Arena; Attendance: 217; Referee: Ievgenii Aranovskyi

28 April 2018 29	Zirka Kropyvnytskyi	2–0	Olimpik Donetsk	Kropyvnytskyi
14:00 EEST (UTC+03:00)	Hovhannisyan (yellow card) 14'; Drachenko (yellow card) 60'; Petrov 64'; Chychykov 75'	Report	Doronin (yellow card) 10'; Hennadiy Pasich (yellow card) 23'; Mishchenko (yellow card) 44'; Nyemchaninov (yellow card) 61'; Snurnitsyn (yellow card) 69'; Tsymbalyuk (yellow card) 90+2'	Stadium: Zirka Stadium; Attendance: 1,393; Referee: Kostyantyn Trukhanov

6 May 2018 30	FC Oleksandriya	1–0	Zirka Kropyvnytskyi	Oleksandriya
19:30 EEST (UTC+03:00)	Zaporozhan 37'; Dovhyi (yellow card) 45'	Report	Bilonoh (yellow card) 42'; Khodakovskyi (yellow card) 85'; Petrov (yellow card) 90'	Stadium: CSC Nika Stadium; Attendance: 1,850; Referee: Kateryna Monzul

12 May 2018 31	Zirka Kropyvnytskyi	1–1	Karpaty Lviv	Kropyvnytskyi
14:00 EEST (UTC+03:00)	Chychykov (yellow card) 15'; Gafaiti (yellow card) 31'; Petrov 39'; Drachenko (yellow card) 45+2'; Guedj (yellow card) 49'	Report	Verbnyi (yellow card) 22'; Lobay (yellow card) 42' (yellow-red card) 87'; Carrascal 45+2' (pen.), (yellow card) 86'; Erbes (yellow card) 50'; Fedetskyi (yellow card) 74'; Catriel Sánchez (yellow card) 90+1'	Stadium: Zirka Stadium; Attendance: 3,417; Referee: Ievgenii Aranovskyi

19 May 2018 32	Chornomorets Odesa	1–0	Zirka Kropyvnytskyi	Odesa
17:00 EEST (UTC+03:00)	Lyulka (yellow card) 35'; Romanyuk (yellow card) 51'; Tretyakov 57'	Report	Petrov (yellow card) 12'; Zbun (yellow card) 67'; Guedj (yellow card) 69'; Yampol (yellow card) 74'; Gafaiti (yellow card) 83'	Stadium: Chornomorets Stadium; Attendance: 4,355; Referee: Dmytro Kutakov

==== Relegation round ====
23 May 2018 1	Zirka Kropyvnytskyi	1–1	Desna Chernihiv	Kropyvnytskyi
17:00 EEST (UTC+03:00)	Favorov 77' (o.g.); Petrov (yellow card) 85'	Report	Ohirya (yellow card) 7'; Volkov 32'; Koberidze (yellow card) 84'	Stadium: Zirka Stadium; Attendance: 2,981; Referee: Serhiy Boyko

27 May 2018 2	Desna Chernihiv	4–0	Zirka Kropyvnytskyi	Chernihiv
18:00 EEST (UTC+03:00)	Denys Favorov 38'; Arveladze 52', 87'; Volkov 63', (yellow card) 63'; Yermakov (yellow card) 85'	Report	Averyanov (yellow card) 55'; Syomka (yellow card) 85'; Gafaiti (yellow card) 85'; Dryshlyuk (yellow card) 86'	Stadium: Chernihiv Stadium; Attendance: 10,799; Referee: Kostyantyn Trukhanov

=== Ukrainian Cup ===
20 September 2017 Round 3 (1/16)	Tavriya Simferopol	3–2	Zirka Kropyvnytskyi	Beryslav
16:00 EEST (UTC+3)	Lohvinenko 9' (pen.); Yeloev 17'; Hryppa (yellow card) 39'; Kushnir (yellow card) 90+3'; Voronchenko 110'	Report	Lyopka (yellow card) 6'; Rassadkin 10', (yellow card) 99'; Panfilov 19'; Zahalskyi (yellow card) 51'; Drachenko (yellow card) 92'	Stadium: Mashynobudivnyk Stadium; Attendance: 1,000; Referee: Yevhen Petrenko

== Statistics ==
=== Appearances and goals ===
No.	Pos	Nat	Player	Total		Premier League		Cup	
No.	Pos	Nat	Player	Apps	Goals	Apps	Goals	Apps	Goals
Goalkeepers
41	GK	(Ukraine) UKR	Roman Lyopka	3	0	1+1	0	1	0
44	GK	(Ukraine) UKR	Yevhen Past	33	0	33	0	0	0
Defenders
3	DF	(France) FRA	Julian Rullier	5	0	4+1	0	0	0
5	DF	(Ukraine) UKR	Anton Bratkov	15	0	14+1	0	0	0
9	DF	(Ukraine) UKR	Nazar Malinovskyi	4	0	1+2	0	1	0
14	DF	(Ukraine) UKR	Mykyta Khodakovskyi	3	0	0+3	0	0	0
16	DF	(Algeria) ALG	Adel Gafaiti	9	0	8+1	0	0	0
18	DF	(Ukraine) UKR	Vladyslav Veremeev	2	0	2	0	0	0
19	DF	(Armenia) ARM	Arman Hovhannisyan	17	0	14+2	0	1	0
20	DF	(Ukraine) UKR	Dmytro Fatyeyev	10	0	9+1	0	0	0
23	DF	(Ukraine) UKR	Oleksandr Matkobozhyk	14	0	12+1	0	1	0
45	DF	(France) FRA	Cécé Pepe	11	0	11	0	0	0
55	DF	(Ukraine) UKR	Maksym Kovalyov	13	0	13	0	0	0
93	DF	(Ukraine) UKR	Ivan Tsyupa	26	2	25+1	2	0	0
Midfielders
7	MF	(Ukraine) UKR	Maksym Drachenko	30	1	29	1	0+1	0
8	MF	(Ukraine) UKR	Pavlo Polehenko	24	0	22+2	0	0	0
10	MF	(Ukraine) UKR	Dmytro Bilonoh	14	3	13+1	3	0	0
21	MF	(Ukraine) UKR	Ihor Zahalskyi	29	2	23+5	2	1	0
22	MF	(France) FRA	Arnaud Guedj	29	0	21+7	0	1	0
24	MF	(Ukraine) UKR	Maksym Averyanov	7	0	3+4	0	0	0
27	MF	(Ukraine) UKR	Kyrylo Dryshlyuk	20	0	9+10	0	1	0
90	MF	(Ukraine) UKR	Yaroslav Yampol	7	0	3+4	0	0	0
Forwards
11	FW	(France) FRA	Hicham El Hamdaoui	6	2	6	2	0	0
15	FW	(Ukraine) UKR	Oleksiy Zbun	11	0	4+7	0	0	0
17	FW	(Ukraine) UKR	Artem Syomka	2	0	0+2	0	0	0
28	FW	(Ukraine) UKR	Vyacheslav Panfilov	7	1	0+6	0	1	1
29	FW	(Ukraine) UKR	Maksym Pryadun	22	4	13+8	4	0+1	0
31	FW	(Ukraine) UKR	Danylo Kondrakov	15	0	3+12	0	0	0
33	FW	(Belarus) BLR	Gleb Rassadkin	16	2	12+3	1	1	1
38	FW	(Ukraine) UKR	Serhiy Petrov	16	3	12+4	3	0	0
77	FW	(Ukraine) UKR	Oleksiy Chychykov	30	3	27+3	3	0	0
81	FW	(Ukraine) UKR	Oleksandr Tarasyuk	2	0	1+1	0	0	0
Players transferred out during the season
4	DF	(Ukraine) UKR	Taras Kacharaba	16	0	15+1	0	0	0
6	MF	(Spain) ESP	Marc Castells	3	0	1+1	0	1	0
9	FW	(Ukraine) UKR	Aderinsola Habib Eseola	5	0	4+1	0	0	0
10	FW	(Ukraine) UKR	Artem Favorov	9	0	5+4	0	0	0
13	FW	(Ukraine) UKR	Oleksandr Zozulya	1	0	0	0	0+1	0
17	MF	(Brazil) BRA	Bruno Vieira de Souza	3	0	0+2	0	1	0

Source: Competitions

Last updated: 27 May 2018

=== Goalscorers ===
Rank	No.	Pos	Nat	Name	Premier League	Cup	Total
1	29	FW	(Ukraine)	Maksym Pryadun	4	0	4
2	10	MF	(Ukraine)	Dmytro Bilonoh	3	0	3
2	38	FW	(Ukraine)	Serhiy Petrov	3	0	3
2	77	FW	(Ukraine)	Oleksiy Chychykov	3	0	3
5	11	FW	(France)	Hicham El Hamdaoui	2	0	2
5	21	MF	(Ukraine)	Ihor Zahalskyi	2	0	2
5	33	FW	(Belarus)	Gleb Rassadkin	1	1	2
5	93	DF	(Ukraine)	Ivan Tsyupa	2	0	2
9	7	MF	(Ukraine)	Maksym Drachenko	1	0	1
9	28	FW	(Ukraine)	Vyacheslav Panfilov	0	1	1
				Own goal	2	0	2
				Total	23	2	25

Last updated: 27 May 2018

=== Clean sheets ===
Rank	No.	Pos	Nat	Name	Premier League	Cup	Total
1	44	GK	(Ukraine)	Yevhen Past	11	0	11
2	41	GK	(Ukraine)	Roman Lyopka	1	0	1
				Total	12	0	12

Last updated: 27 May 2018

=== Disciplinary record ===
No.	Pos	Nat	Player	Premier League			Cup			Total		
No.	Pos	Nat	Player	Booked	(yellow card) (yellow-red card)	Sent off (straight red)	Booked	(yellow card) (yellow-red card)	Sent off (straight red)	Booked	(yellow card) (yellow-red card)	Sent off (straight red)
3	DF	(France)	Julian Rullier	1	0	0	0	0	0	1	0	0
4	DF	(Ukraine)	Taras Kacharaba	5	1	0	0	0	0	5	1	0
5	DF	(Ukraine)	Anton Bratkov	1	0	0	0	0	0	1	0	0
7	MF	(Ukraine)	Maksym Drachenko	12	0	0	1	0	0	13	0	0
8	MF	(Ukraine)	Pavlo Polehenko	3	0	0	0	0	0	3	0	0
9	FW	(Ukraine)	Aderinsola Habib Eseola	2	0	0	0	0	0	2	0	0
10	MF	(Ukraine)	Dmytro Bilonoh	2	0	0	0	0	0	2	0	0
10	FW	(Ukraine)	Artem Favorov	1	1	0	0	0	0	1	1	0
11	FW	(France)	Hicham El Hamdaoui	3	0	0	0	0	0	3	0	0
14	DF	(Ukraine)	Mykyta Khodakovskyi	1	0	0	0	0	0	1	0	0
15	FW	(Ukraine)	Oleksiy Zbun	2	0	0	0	0	0	2	0	0
16	DF	(Algeria)	Adel Gafaiti	4	0	0	0	0	0	4	0	0
17	FW	(Ukraine)	Artem Syomka	2	0	0	0	0	0	2	0	0
19	DF	(Armenia)	Arman Hovhannisyan	3	1	0	0	0	0	3	1	0
20	DF	(Ukraine)	Dmytro Fatyeyev	1	0	0	0	0	0	1	0	0
21	MF	(Ukraine)	Ihor Zahalskyi	8	0	0	1	0	0	9	0	0
22	MF	(France)	Arnaud Guedj	7	1	0	0	0	0	7	1	0
23	DF	(Ukraine)	Oleksandr Matkobozhyk	2	0	0	0	0	0	2	0	0
24	MF	(Ukraine)	Maksym Averyanov	2	0	0	0	0	0	2	0	0
27	MF	(Ukraine)	Kyrylo Dryshlyuk	4	0	0	0	0	0	4	0	0
28	FW	(Ukraine)	Vyacheslav Panfilov	1	0	0	0	0	0	1	0	0
29	FW	(Ukraine)	Maksym Pryadun	5	0	0	0	0	0	5	0	0
33	FW	(Belarus)	Gleb Rassadkin	1	0	0	1	0	0	2	0	0
38	FW	(Ukraine)	Serhiy Petrov	8	0	0	0	0	0	8	0	0
41	GK	(Ukraine)	Roman Lyopka	0	0	0	1	0	0	1	0	0
44	GK	(Ukraine)	Yevhen Past	1	0	0	0	0	0	1	0	0
45	DF	(France)	Cécé Pepe	3	0	0	0	0	0	3	0	0
55	DF	(Ukraine)	Maksym Kovalyov	1	0	1	0	0	0	1	0	1
77	FW	(Ukraine)	Oleksiy Chychykov	2	0	0	0	0	0	2	0	0
90	MF	(Ukraine)	Yaroslav Yampol	1	0	0	0	0	0	1	0	0
93	DF	(Ukraine)	Ivan Tsyupa	4	2	0	0	0	0	4	2	0
			Total	91	6	1	4	0	0	95	6	1

Last updated: 27 May 2018
