= List of Ukrainian football transfers summer 2017 =

This is a list of Ukrainian football transfers summer 2017. Only clubs in 2017–18 Ukrainian Premier League are included.

== Ukrainian Premier League ==
=== Chornomorets Odesa ===
In:

No.	Pos.	Nation	Player
—	GK	UKR	Andriy Fedorenko (free agent)
—	GK	BLR	Alyaksandr Hutar (from (Russia) Tosno)
—	DF	FRA	Mamadou Wagué (from (Sweden) Syrianska)
—	DF	UKR	Serhiy Petko (loan return from (Ukraine) Veres Rivne)
—	DF	UKR	Denys Balan (from (Ukraine) Cherkaskyi Dnipro)
—	DF	UKR	Yevhen Zubeyko (from (Ukraine) Karpaty Lviv)
—	DF	UKR	Artur Novotryasov (from (Ukraine) FC Mariupol)
—	DF	BLR	Artsyom Rakhmanaw (from (Moldova) Milsami Orhei)
—	DF	SRB	Ivica Žunić (from (Russia) FC Orenburg)
—	DF	UKR	Denys Norenkov (loan return from (Ukraine) Helios Kharkiv)
—	MF	GUI	Fousseni Bamba (free agent)
—	MF	FRA	Alassane N'Diaye (from (France) Belfort)
—	MF	UKR	Renat Mochulyak (from (Greece) Platanias)
—	MF	UKR	Ivan Bobko (free agent)
—	MF	UKR	Serhiy Politylo (free agent)
—	MF	UKR	Viktor Serdenyuk (from (Ukraine) Real Pharma Odesa)
—	MF	UKR	Pavlo Orikhovskyi (from (Ukraine) Dynamo Kyiv)
—	FW	UKR	Vadym Yavorskyi (loan return from (Ukraine) Hirnyk-Sport)
—	FW	UKR	Vitaliy Kaverin (free agent)
—	FW	UKR	Oleksiy Antonov (free agent)
—	FW	UKR	Denys Vasin (from (Ukraine) Stal Kamianske)

Out:

No.	Pos.	Nation	Player
—	GK	UKR	Danylo Kanevtsev (to (Ukraine) Metalist 1925 Kharkiv)
—	GK	UKR	Bohdan Lobodrov (on loan to (Ukraine) Balkany Zorya)
—	DF	UKR	Oleksandr Azatskyi (to (Czech Republic) Baník Ostrava)
—	DF	GEO	Giorgi Gadrani (to (Georgia (country)) Dinamo Tbilisi)
—	DF	UKR	Oleksandr Kalitov (to (Ukraine) Real Pharma Odesa)
—	DF	GEO	Davit Khocholava (to (Ukraine) Shakhtar Donetsk)
—	DF	UKR	Rizvan Ablitarov (to (Kazakhstan) FC Atyrau)
—	DF	UKR	Denys Balan (to (Ukraine) Inhulets Petrove)
—	DF	UKR	Artur Novotryasov (to (Ukraine) Inhulets Petrove)
—	DF	BLR	Artsyom Rakhmanaw
—	DF	UKR	Denys Norenkov (to (Ukraine) Zhemchuzhyna Odesa)
—	DF	UKR	Serhiy Petko (to (Ukraine) Zhemchuzhyna Odesa)
—	MF	UKR	Oleksandr Andriyevskyi (loan return to (Ukraine) Dynamo Kyiv)
—	MF	UKR	Oleh Danchenko (loan return to (Ukraine) Shakhtar Donetsk)
—	MF	UKR	Vladyslav Kabayev (to (Ukraine) Zorya Luhansk)
—	MF	UKR	Artur Karnoza
—	MF	UKR	Ivan Bobko
—	MF	UKR	Petro Pereverza (to (Ukraine) Balkany Zorya)
—	FW	BRA	Jorge Elias (loan return to (Austria) Kapfenberger SV)
—	FW	UKR	Dmytro Korkishko (to (Turkey) Giresunspor)
—	FW	UKR	Mykhaylo Plokhotnyuk (on loan to (Ukraine) Dynamo Kyiv)
—	FW	UKR	Vadym Yavorskyi (on loan to (Ukraine) MFC Mykolaiv)
—	FW	UKR	Yevhen Murashov (to (Ukraine) Zhemchuzhyna Odesa)

=== Dynamo Kyiv ===
In:

No.	Pos.	Nation	Player
—	DF	UKR	Andriy Tsurikov (loan return from (Ukraine) FC Oleksandriya)
—	DF	POL	Tomasz Kędziora (from (Poland) Lech Poznań)
—	DF	CRO	Josip Pivarić (from (Croatia) Dinamo Zagreb)
—	DF	GEO	Luka Lochoshvili (from (Georgia (country)) Dinamo Tbilisi)
—	MF	UKR	Oleh Husyev (free agent)
—	MF	UKR	Serhiy Myakushko (loan return from (Ukraine) Vorskla Poltava)
—	MF	MAR	Younès Belhanda (loan return from (France) Nice)
—	FW	UKR	Oleksandr Hladkyy (loan return from (Ukraine) Karpaty Lviv)
—	FW	COD	Dieumerci Mbokani (loan return from (England) Hull City)
—	FW	BRA	Júnior Moraes (loan return from (China) Tianjin Quanjian)
—	FW	UKR	Artem Kravets (loan return from (Spain) Granada)
—	FW	UKR	Dmytro Khlyobas (loan return from (Ukraine) Vorskla Poltava)
—	FW	UKR	Mykhaylo Plokhotnyuk (on loan from (Ukraine) Chornomorets Odesa)

Out:

No.	Pos.	Nation	Player
—	GK	UKR	Vadym Soldatenko (to (Ukraine) Naftovyk-Ukrnafta)
—	DF	UKR	Andriy Tsurikov (to (Ukraine) FC Oleksandriya)
—	DF	UKR	Oleksandr Osman (on loan to (Ukraine) Karpaty Lviv)
—	DF	UKR	Pavlo Lukyanchuk (on loan to (Ukraine) Olimpik Donetsk)
—	DF	UKR	Oleksandr Tymchyk (on loan to (Ukraine) Stal Kamianske)
—	DF	POR	Vitorino Antunes (on loan to (Spain) Getafe)
—	DF	UKR	Serhiy Chobotenko (to (Ukraine) Shakhtar Donetsk)
—	DF	UKR	Zurab Ochigava (on loan to (Ukraine) Olimpik Donetsk)
—	MF	UKR	Valeriy Fedorchuk (to (Ukraine) Veres Rivne)
—	MF	MAR	Younès Belhanda (to (Turkey) Galatasaray)
—	MF	UKR	Serhiy Myakushko (to (Ukraine) Karpaty Lviv)
—	MF	UKR	Bohdan Mykhaylychenko (on loan to (Ukraine) Stal Kamianske)
—	MF	UKR	Oleksandr Andriyevskyi (on loan to (Ukraine) Zorya Luhansk)
—	MF	UKR	Serhiy Rybalka (on loan to (Turkey) Sivasspor)
—	MF	UKR	Pavlo Orikhovskyi (to (Ukraine) Chornomorets Odesa)
—	FW	UKR	Oleksiy Schebetun (on loan to (Ukraine) Stal Kamianske)
—	FW	UKR	Oleksandr Hladkyy (to (Ukraine) Karpaty Lviv)
—	FW	UKR	Dmytro Khlyobas (on loan to (Belarus) Dinamo Minsk)
—	FW	UKR	Roman Yaremchuk (to (Belgium) Gent)
—	FW	UKR	Andriy Yarmolenko (to (Germany) Borussia Dortmund)

=== Karpaty Lviv ===
In:

No.	Pos.	Nation	Player
—	GK	UKR	Oleh Mozil (loan return from (Ukraine) Bukovyna Chernivtsi)
—	DF	UKR	Andriy Markovych (loan return from (Belarus) Naftan Novopolotsk)
—	DF	UKR	Vasyl Kravets (loan return from (Spain) CD Lugo)
—	DF	ARG	Federico Pereyra (from (Ukraine) Zirka Kropyvnytskyi)
—	DF	UKR	Oleksandr Osman (on loan from (Ukraine) Dynamo Kyiv)
—	DF	ARG	Guido Corteggiano (from (Italy) Triestina)
—	DF	UKR	Artem Fedetskyi (from (Germany) SV Darmstadt 98)
—	MF	UKR	Yuriy Tkachuk (from (Spain) Atlético Madrid B)
—	MF	ESP	Mario Arqués (from (Spain) CD Alcoyano)
—	MF	COL	Jorge Carrascal (on loan from (Spain) Sevilla Atlético)
—	MF	ARG	Fernando Tissone (free agent)
—	MF	UKR	Serhiy Myakushko (from (Ukraine) Dynamo Kyiv)
—	FW	UKR	Leonid Akulinin (from (Lithuania) Sūduva Marijampolė)
—	FW	UKR	Roman Debelko (from (Ukraine) Stal Kamianske)
—	FW	URU	Sebastián Ribas (from (Mexico) Venados)
—	FW	ARG	Francisco Di Franco (on loan from (Cyprus) Apollon Limassol)
—	FW	UKR	Redvan Memeshev (from (Ukraine) Volyn Lutsk)
—	FW	UKR	Maryan Shved (from (Spain) Sevilla Atlético)
—	FW	UKR	Oleksandr Hladkyy (from (Ukraine) Dynamo Kyiv)

Out:

No.	Pos.	Nation	Player
—	GK	UKR	Yevhen Borovyk (to (Bulgaria) Cherno More Varna)
—	DF	ARG	Cristian Paz (loan return to (Argentina) Temperley)
—	DF	UKR	Andriy Markovych (on loan to (Ukraine) Rukh Vynnyky)
—	DF	UKR	Mykola Matviyenko (loan return to (Ukraine) Shakhtar Donetsk)
—	DF	UKR	Vasyl Kravets (to (Spain) CD Lugo)
—	DF	UKR	Yevhen Zubeyko (to (Ukraine) Chornomorets Odesa)
—	DF	UKR	Oleksiy Dytyatev (to (Poland) Cracovia)
—	MF	UKR	Artem Filimonov (on loan to (Cyprus) Pafos FC)
—	MF	UKR	Maksym Hrysyo (on loan to (Ukraine) Rukh Vynnyky)
—	MF	UKR	Yuriy Tkachuk (on loan to (Ukraine) Rukh Vynnyky)
—	MF	UKR	Nazar Verbnyi (on loan to (Ukraine) Rukh Vynnyky)
—	FW	UKR	Oleksandr Hladkyy (loan return to (Ukraine) Dynamo Kyiv)
—	FW	UKR	Viktor Khomchenko (on loan to (Ukraine) Rukh Vynnyky)
—	FW	URU	Sebastián Ribas (on loan to (Argentina) Patronato)

=== Mariupol ===
In:

No.	Pos.	Nation	Player
—	GK	UKR	Ihor Levchenko (from (Ukraine) Zorya Luhansk)
—	DF	UKR	Ihor Kyryukhantsev (from (Ukraine) Shakhtar Donetsk)
—	DF	UKR	Maksym Bilyi (from (Russia) Anzhi Makhachkala)
—	DF	BRA	Eriks Santos (from (Brazil) Internacional)
—	MF	UKR	Oleksandr Luchyk (loan return from (Ukraine) FC Poltava)
—	MF	UKR	Serhiy Prykhodko (loan return from (Ukraine) FC Poltava)
—	MF	UKR	Ivan Yanakov (loan return from (Ukraine) FC Poltava)
—	MF	UKR	Vyacheslav Churko (on loan from (Ukraine) Shakhtar Donetsk)
—	MF	UKR	Serhiy Bolbat (on loan from (Ukraine) Shakhtar Donetsk)
—	MF	UKR	Vitaliy Koltsov (from (Ukraine) Shakhtar Donetsk)
—	MF	UKR	Andriy Korobenko (on loan from (Ukraine) Shakhtar Donetsk)
—	MF	UKR	Valeriy Hayvan ((on loan?) from (Ukraine) Shakhtar Donetsk U-19)
—	MF	UKR	Vitaliy Vitsenets (free agent)
—	MF	UKR	Vyacheslav Tankovskyi (on loan from (Ukraine) Shakhtar Donetsk)
—	MF	UKR	Andriy Totovytskyi (on loan from (Ukraine) Shakhtar Donetsk)
—	FW	UKR	Vladyslav Buhay (on loan from (Ukraine) Shakhtar Donetsk)
—	FW	UKR	Tomas Nicolas Sereda (on loan from (Greece) Asteras Tripolis)
—	FW	UKR	Andriy Boryachuk (on loan from (Ukraine) Shakhtar Donetsk)
—	FW	UKR	Artem Merkushov (from (Ukraine) PFC Sumy)

Out:

No.	Pos.	Nation	Player
—	GK	UKR	Yaroslav Vazhynskyi (to (Ukraine) MFC Mykolaiv)
—	DF	UKR	Ihor Duts (loan return to (Ukraine) Shakhtar Donetsk)
—	DF	UKR	Ivan Tsyupa (to (Ukraine) Zirka Kropyvnytskyi)
—	DF	UKR	Maksym Zhychykov (loan return to (Ukraine) Shakhtar Donetsk)
—	DF	UKR	Artur Novotryasov (to (Ukraine) Chornomorets Odesa)
—	MF	UKR	Dmytro Ivanisenya
—	MF	UKR	Oleksandr Kozak (loan return to (Ukraine) Stal Kamianske)
—	MF	UKR	Oleksandr Mihunov (loan return to (Ukraine) Shakhtar Donetsk)
—	MF	UKR	Vitaliy Koltsov (loan return to (Ukraine) Shakhtar Donetsk)
—	MF	UKR	Mykola Buy (to (Ukraine) Rukh Vynnyky)
—	MF	UKR	Serhiy Prykhodko
—	MF	UKR	Ivan Yanakov (to (Ukraine) Kremin Kremenchuk)
—	MF	UKR	Kostyantyn Yaroshenko (to (Finland) Kokkolan Palloveikot)
—	MF	UKR	Oleksandr Luchyk (to (Ukraine) MFC Mykolaiv)

=== Oleksandriya ===
In:

No.	Pos.	Nation	Player
—	GK	UKR	Yuriy Pankiv (from (Ukraine) Stal Kamianske)
—	DF	UKR	Andriy Batsula (from (Ukraine) Zirka Kropyvnytskyi)
—	DF	AZE	Pavlo Pashayev (from (Ukraine) Stal Kamianske)
—	DF	UKR	Andriy Tsurikov (from (Ukraine) Dynamo Kyiv)
—	MF	UKR	Oleksiy Dovhyi (from (Ukraine) Stal Kamianske)
—	MF	UKR	Artem Schedryi (from (Ukraine) Zirka Kropyvnytskyi)
—	MF	UKR	Bohdan Borovskyi (loan return from (Ukraine) Inhulets Petrove)
—	MF	UKR	Maksym Kalenchuk (from (Ukraine) Stal Kamianske)
—	FW	UKR	Artem Sitalo (from (Ukraine) Zirka Kropyvnytskyi)

Out:

No.	Pos.	Nation	Player
—	GK	UKR	Andriy Novak (to (Cyprus) Ermis Aradippou)
—	DF	UKR	Serhiy Siminin (to (Ukraine) Veres Rivne)
—	DF	UKR	Andriy Tsurikov (loan return to (Ukraine) Dynamo Kyiv)
—	DF	UKR	Yuriy Putrash
—	DF	UKR	Anton Shendrik
—	MF	UKR	Pavlo Myahkov (to (Belarus) FC Minsk)
—	MF	UKR	Dmytro Leonov (to (Ukraine) Kolos Kovalivka)
—	MF	GEO	Vakhtang Chanturishvili (to (Slovakia) Spartak Trnava)
—	MF	UKR	Vladyslav Ohirya (to (Kazakhstan) Irtysh Pavlodar)
—	MF	UKR	Volodymyr Pryyomov (to (Ukraine) Olimpik Donetsk)
—	MF	UKR	Bohdan Borovskyi (to (Ukraine) Kremin Kremenchuk)

=== Olimpik Donetsk ===
In:

No.	Pos.	Nation	Player
—	GK	UKR	Artem Kychak (from (Ukraine) Volyn Lutsk)
—	DF	UKR	Anton Kravchenko (from (Ukraine) Stal Kamianske)
—	DF	UKR	Artem Shabanov (from (Ukraine) Stal Kamianske)
—	DF	UKR	Vyacheslav Lukhtanov (from (Ukraine) Veres Rivne)
—	DF	UKR	Pavlo Lukyanchuk (on loan from (Ukraine) Dynamo Kyiv)
—	DF	UKR	Zurab Ochigava (on loan from (Ukraine) Dynamo Kyiv)
—	MF	BRA	Guttiner Tenorio (from (Brazil) Vitória das Tabocas)
—	MF	UKR	Ivan Sondey (from (Ukraine) Naftovyk-Ukrnafta Okhtyrka)
—	MF	UKR	Oleksandr Mihunov (on loan from (Ukraine) Shakhtar Donetsk)
—	MF	UKR	Volodymyr Pryyomov (from (Ukraine) Oleksandriya)
—	FW	UKR	Ilya Mikhalyov (from (Russia) Luch-Energiya Vladivostok)

Out:

No.	Pos.	Nation	Player
—	GK	UKR	Bohdan Stepanenko (to (Ukraine) Nyva Ternopil)
—	GK	UKR	Yaroslav Kotlyarov (on loan to (Ukraine) Helios Kharkiv)
—	DF	UKR	Dmytro Hryshko (to (Russia) SKA-Khabarovsk)
—	DF	UKR	Yaroslav Oliynyk (to (Russia) Tom Tomsk)
—	DF	UKR	Vadym Schastlyvtsev (on loan to (Ukraine) Helios Kharkiv)
—	DF	UKR	Artem Kozlov (on loan to (Ukraine) Helios Kharkiv)
—	DF	UKR	Temur Partsvania (to (Ukraine) Desna Chernihiv)
—	DF	UKR	Dmytro Nyemchaninov (to (Russia) Krylia Sovetov Samara)
—	MF	UKR	Serhiy Hryn (loan return to (Ukraine) Shakhtar Donetsk)
—	MF	UKR	Vitaliy Hemeha (to (Ukraine) Rukh Vynnyky)
—	MF	UKR	Ihor Zhurakhovskyi (to (Sweden) Gefle)
—	MF	UKR	Vitaliy Hoshkoderya (to (Kazakhstan) Okzhetpes)
—	MF	UKR	Vladyslav Sharay (on loan to (Ukraine) Avanhard Kramatorsk)
—	FW	UKR	Ivan Matyazh (to (Croatia) Istra 1961)
—	FW	UKR	Mykhaylo Serhiychuk (to (Ukraine) Veres Rivne)

=== Shakhtar Donetsk ===
In:

No.	Pos.	Nation	Player
—	DF	GEO	Davit Khocholava (from (Ukraine) Chornomorets Odesa)
—	DF	UKR	Ihor Duts (loan return from (Ukraine) FC Mariupol)
—	DF	UKR	Mykola Matviyenko (loan return from (Ukraine) Karpaty Lviv)
—	DF	UKR	Maksym Zhychykov (loan return from (Ukraine) FC Mariupol)
—	DF	UKR	Eduard Sobol (loan return from (Ukraine) Zorya Luhansk)
—	DF	UKR	Serhiy Chobotenko (from (Ukraine) Dynamo Kyiv)
—	MF	UKR	Ivan Petryak (loan return from (Ukraine) Zorya Luhansk)
—	MF	UKR	Oleksandr Karavayev (loan return from (Turkey) Fenerbahçe)
—	MF	UKR	Ruslan Malinovskyi (loan return from (Belgium) Genk)
—	MF	UKR	Andriy Totovytskyi (loan return from (Belgium) Kortrijk)
—	MF	UKR	Serhiy Bolbat (loan return from (Belgium) Lokeren)
—	MF	UKR	Oleh Danchenko (loan return from (Ukraine) Chornomorets Odesa)
—	MF	UKR	Serhiy Hryn (loan return from (Ukraine) Olimpik Donetsk)
—	MF	UKR	Oleksandr Mihunov (loan return from (Ukraine) FC Mariupol)
—	MF	UKR	Vitaliy Koltsov (loan return from (Ukraine) FC Mariupol)
—	FW	UKR	Pylyp Budkivskyi (loan return from (Russia) Anzhi Makhachkala)
—	FW	UKR	Vladyslav Kulach (loan return from (Ukraine) Zorya Luhansk)
—	FW	UKR	Denys Bezborodko (loan return from (Ukraine) Zorya Luhansk)
—	FW	UKR	Artem Dudik (from (Ukraine) Volyn Lutsk)
—	FW	UKR	Vladyslav Buhay (loan return from (Ukraine) Bukovyna Chernivtsi)

Out:

No.	Pos.	Nation	Player
—	GK	UKR	Anton Kanibolotskiy (to (Azerbaijan) Qarabağ)
—	DF	UKR	Taras Kacharaba (on loan to (Ukraine) Zirka Kropyvnytskyi)
—	DF	UKR	Vasyl Kobin (to (Ukraine) Veres Rivne)
—	DF	UKR	Oleksandr Kucher (to (Turkey) Kayserispor)
—	DF	UKR	Ihor Duts (on loan to (Ukraine) Rukh Vynnyky)
—	DF	UKR	Ihor Kyryukhantsev (to (Ukraine) FC Mariupol)
—	DF	UKR	Mykola Matviyenko (on loan to (Ukraine) Vorskla Poltava)
—	DF	UKR	Maksym Zhychykov ((on loan?) to (Lithuania) FK Jonava)
—	DF	UKR	Eduard Sobol (on loan to (Czech Republic) Slavia Prague)
—	MF	UKR	Oleh Danchenko (on loan to (Russia) Anzhi Makhachkala)
—	MF	UKR	Ruslan Malinovskyi (to (Belgium) Genk)
—	MF	UKR	Vyacheslav Churko (on loan to (Ukraine) FC Mariupol)
—	MF	UKR	Vitaliy Koltsov (to (Ukraine) FC Mariupol)
—	MF	UKR	Serhiy Bolbat (on loan to (Ukraine) FC Mariupol)
—	MF	UKR	Serhiy Hryn (on loan to (Ukraine) Veres Rivne)
—	MF	UKR	Oleksandr Mihunov (on loan to (Ukraine) Olimpik Donetsk)
—	MF	UKR	Andriy Korobenko (on loan to (Ukraine) FC Mariupol)
—	MF	UKR	Vyacheslav Tankovskyi (on loan to (Ukraine) FC Mariupol)
—	MF	UKR	Andriy Totovytskyi (on loan to (Ukraine) FC Mariupol)
—	MF	UKR	Oleksandr Karavayev (to (Ukraine) Zorya Luhansk)
—	FW	UKR	Andriy Boryachuk (on loan to (Ukraine) FC Mariupol)
—	FW	UKR	Pylyp Budkivskyi (on loan to (Belgium) Kortrijk)
—	FW	UKR	Vladyslav Buhay (on loan to (Ukraine) FC Mariupol)
—	FW	UKR	Vladyslav Kulach (on loan to (Ukraine) Vorskla Poltava)
—	FW	UKR	Denys Bezborodko ((on loan?) to (Ukraine) Desna Chernihiv)

=== Stal Kamianske ===
In:

No.	Pos.	Nation	Player
—	DF	UKR	Oleksandr Tymchyk (on loan from (Ukraine) Dynamo Kyiv)
—	DF	UKR	Bohdan Mykhaylychenko (on loan from (Ukraine) Dynamo Kyiv)
—	DF	UKR	Yevhen Tkachuk (from (Kazakhstan) Irtysh Pavlodar)
—	MF	SRB	Nemanja Obradović (from (Serbia) Čukarički)
—	MF	UKR	Oleksandr Kozak (loan return from (Ukraine) FC Mariupol)
—	FW	UKR	Oleksiy Schebetun (on loan from (Ukraine) Dynamo Kyiv)

Out:

No.	Pos.	Nation	Player
—	GK	UKR	Oleksandr Bandura (to (Ukraine) Veres Rivne)
—	GK	UKR	Yuriy Pankiv (to (Ukraine) FC Oleksandriya)
—	DF	UKR	Mykola Ischenko (to (Ukraine) Veres Rivne)
—	DF	AZE	Pavlo Pashayev (to (Ukraine) FC Oleksandriya)
—	DF	SRB	Miloš Stamenković (to (Kazakhstan) Irtysh Pavlodar)
—	DF	UKR	Anton Kravchenko (to (Ukraine) Olimpik Donetsk)
—	DF	UKR	Artem Shabanov (to (Ukraine) Olimpik Donetsk)
—	DF	UKR	Serhiy Voronin
—	DF	BRA	Leandro da Silva
—	MF	CUW	Boy Deul (to (Cyprus) Pafos FC)
—	MF	UKR	Oleksiy Dovhyi (to (Ukraine) FC Oleksandriya)
—	MF	UKR	Maksym Kalenchuk (to (Ukraine) FC Oleksandriya)
—	MF	UKR	Roman Karasyuk (to (Ukraine) Veres Rivne)
—	MF	UKR	Oleksandr Kozak (to (Ukraine) Obolon-Brovar Kyiv)
—	FW	UKR	Denys Vasin (to (Ukraine) Chornomorets Odesa)
—	FW	GHA	Kwame Karikari (to (Qatar) Al-Markhiya)
—	FW	UKR	Roman Debelko (to (Ukraine) Karpaty Lviv)

=== Veres Rivne ===
In:

No.	Pos.	Nation	Player
—	GK	UKR	Oleksandr Bandura (from (Ukraine) Stal Kamianske)
—	GK	UKR	Dmytro Fastov (from (Ukraine) Inhulets Petrove)
—	DF	UKR	Serhiy Siminin (from (Ukraine) FC Oleksandriya)
—	DF	UKR	Volodymyr Adamyuk (from (Ukraine) Dnipro Dnipropetrovsk)
—	DF	UKR	Mykola Ischenko (from (Ukraine) Stal Kamianske)
—	DF	UKR	Volodymyr Domnitsak (from (Ukraine) Budivelnyk Zapytiv)
—	DF	UKR	Ihor Chenakal (from (Ukraine) FC Lviv)
—	DF	UKR	Vasyl Kobin (from (Ukraine) Shakhtar Donetsk)
—	MF	UKR	Roman Karasyuk (from (Ukraine) Stal Kamianske)
—	MF	UKR	Hennadiy Pasich (from (Ukraine) Naftovyk-Ukrnafta)
—	MF	UKR	Yevhen Pasich (from (Ukraine) Naftovyk-Ukrnafta)
—	MF	UKR	Serhiy Hryn (on loan from (Ukraine) Shakhtar Donetsk)
—	MF	UKR	Valeriy Fedorchuk (from (Ukraine) Dynamo Kyiv)
—	MF	ESP	Edgar Caparrós (free agent)
—	FW	UKR	Mykhaylo Serhiychuk (from (Ukraine) Olimpik Donetsk)
—	FW	UKR	Vasyl Palahnyuk (free agent)

Out:

No.	Pos.	Nation	Player
—	GK	UKR	Roman Chopko (to (Ukraine) FC Ternopil)
—	GK	UKR	Oleksandr Ilyuschenkov (to (Ukraine) Rukh Vynnyky)
—	DF	UKR	Serhiy Petko (loan return to (Ukraine) Chornomorets Odesa)
—	DF	UKR	Vyacheslav Lukhtanov (to (Ukraine) Olimpik Donetsk)
—	DF	UKR	Vasyl Bilyi (to (Ukraine) Rukh Vynnyky)
—	DF	UKR	Yarema Kavatsiv
—	DF	UKR	Oleksiy Zozulya (to (Ukraine) Kolos Kovalivka)
—	MF	UKR	Serhiy Herasymets (to (Ukraine) MFC Mykolaiv)
—	MF	UKR	Borys Orlovskyi (to (Ukraine) FC Lviv)
—	MF	UKR	Valeriy Lebed (to (Ukraine) PFC Sumy)
—	MF	GHA	Barnor Bright (to (Ukraine) MFC Mykolaiv)
—	MF	UKR	Volodymyr Dmytrenko (to (Ukraine) Arsenal Kyiv)
—	MF	UKR	Valeriy Fedorchuk
—	MF	UKR	Vadym Strashkevych (to (Ukraine) FC Poltava)
—	MF	UKR	Taras Koblyuk (to (Ukraine) FC Lviv)
—	FW	UKR	Ihor Sikorskyi (to (Ukraine) MFC Mykolaiv)
—	FW	UKR	Dmytro Kozban (to (Poland) Motor Lublin)

=== Vorskla Poltava ===
In:

No.	Pos.	Nation	Player
—	GK	UKR	Oleksandr Tkachenko (loan return from (Ukraine) Hirnyk-Sport)
—	DF	UKR	Mykola Matviyenko (on loan from (Ukraine) Shakhtar Donetsk)
—	DF	GEO	Andro Giorgadze (from (Georgia (country)) Merani Martvili)
—	MF	GEO	Aleksandre Kobakhidze (from (Turkey) Göztepe)
—	FW	UKR	Yuriy Kolomoyets (from (Hungary) MTK Budapest)
—	FW	UKR	Vladyslav Kulach (on loan from (Ukraine) Shakhtar Donetsk)
—	FW	ARM	Gegham Kadymyan (from (Ukraine) Zorya Luhansk)

Out:

No.	Pos.	Nation	Player
—	DF	UKR	Mykola Kvasnyi (to (Ukraine) PFC Sumy)
—	MF	UKR	Bohdan Melnyk (to (Hungary) Kisvárda)
—	MF	UKR	Serhiy Myakushko (loan return to (Ukraine) Dynamo Kyiv)
—	MF	UKR	Serhiy Ichanskyi ((on loan?) to (Ukraine) Cherkaskyi Dnipro)
—	MF	UKR	Yevhen Zarichnyuk (to (Ukraine) Mykolaiv)
—	FW	UKR	Dmytro Khlyobas (loan return to (Ukraine) Dynamo Kyiv)
—	FW	UKR	Oleh Barannik (to (Ukraine) FC Poltava)

=== Zirka Kropyvnytskyi ===
In:

No.	Pos.	Nation	Player
—	DF	ARM	Arman Hovhannisyan (from (Armenia) Shirak Gyumri)
—	DF	UKR	Taras Kacharaba (on loan from (Ukraine) Shakhtar Donetsk)
—	DF	FRA	Cécé Pepe (from (France) Marseille B)
—	DF	UKR	Ivan Tsyupa (from (Ukraine) FC Mariupol)
—	DF	UKR	Nazar Malinovskyi (from (Ukraine) Metalist 1925 Kharkiv)
—	MF	ESP	Marc Castells (from (Spain) Hospitalet)
—	MF	FRA	Arnaud Guedj (from (France) Nice B)
—	MF	UKR	Artem Favorov (loan return from (Denmark) Vejle Boldklub)
—	FW	FRA	Hicham El Hamdaoui (from (Belgium) Tertre-Hautrage)
—	FW	UKR	Danylo Kondrakov (from (Ukraine) Skala Stryi)
—	FW	UKR	Vyacheslav Panfilov (free agent)
—	FW	UKR	Serhiy Petrov (from (Ukraine) Volyn Lutsk)
—	FW	BLR	Gleb Rassadkin (from (Belarus) Dinamo Minsk)

Out:

No.	Pos.	Nation	Player
—	GK	UKR	Maksym Sidelnyk
—	DF	ESP	Borja Ekiza (to (Cyprus) AC Omonia)
—	DF	BRA	Nailson (loan return to (Portugal) Famalicão)
—	DF	UKR	Andriy Batsula (to (Ukraine) FC Oleksandriya)
—	DF	ARG	Federico Pereyra (to (Ukraine) Karpaty Lviv)
—	DF	MDA	Oleksandr Kucherenko (to (Ukraine) Inhulets Petrove)
—	DF	UKR	Ihor Chenakal (to (Ukraine) FC Lviv)
—	MF	UKR	Denys Sidelnyk
—	MF	UKR	Serhiy Kernozhytskyi (to (Ukraine) Metalurh Zaporizhya)
—	MF	UKR	Vladyslav Lupashko (to (Ukraine) Inhulets Petrove)
—	MF	UKR	Roman Popov (to (Ukraine) MFC Mykolaiv)
—	MF	UKR	Artem Schedryi (to (Ukraine) FC Oleksandriya)
—	MF	UKR	Dmytro Bilonoh (loan return to (Russia) Ural Yekaterinburg)
—	MF	UKR	Mykyta Zhukov (loan return to (Ukraine) Inhulets Petrove)
—	FW	UKR	Oleksandr Akymenko (to (Ukraine) Inhulets Petrove)
—	FW	UKR	Aderinsola Habib Eseola (on loan to (Ukraine) Arsenal Kyiv)
—	FW	UKR	Artem Sitalo (to (Ukraine) FC Oleksandriya)

=== Zorya Luhansk ===
In:

No.	Pos.	Nation	Player
—	GK	UKR	Andriy Lunin (from (Ukraine) Dnipro)
—	DF	UKR	Oleksandr Svatok (from (Ukraine) Dnipro)
—	DF	UKR	Vasyl Pryima (from (Italy) Frosinone)
—	MF	UKR	Vladyslav Kabayev (from (Ukraine) Chornomorets Odesa)
—	MF	UKR	Maksym Lunyov (from (Ukraine) Dnipro)
—	MF	BRA	Leonidas (from (Brazil) Villa Nova)
—	MF	BRA	Silas (from (Brazil) Internacional)
—	MF	UKR	Yevhen Cheberko (from (Ukraine) Dnipro)
—	MF	UKR	Vladyslav Kocherhin (from (Ukraine) Dnipro)
—	MF	UKR	Artem Hromov (from (Russia) Krylia Sovetov Samara)
—	MF	UKR	Oleksandr Andriyevskyi (on loan from (Ukraine) Dynamo Kyiv)
—	MF	UKR	Oleksandr Karavayev (from (Ukraine) Shakhtar Donetsk)
—	FW	BRA	Iury (from (Brazil) Avaí)

Out:

No.	Pos.	Nation	Player
—	GK	UKR	Ihor Levchenko (to (Ukraine) FC Mariupol)
—	DF	UKR	Eduard Sobol (loan return to (Ukraine) Shakhtar Donetsk)
—	DF	UKR	Hryhoriy Yarmash (retired)
—	DF	UKR	Mykhaylo Shershen (on loan to (Ukraine) Avanhard Kramatorsk)
—	DF	BRA	Rafael Forster (to (Bulgaria) Ludogorets Razgrad)
—	MF	UKR	Ivan Petryak (loan return to (Ukraine) Shakhtar Donetsk)
—	MF	UKR	Ihor Chaykovskyi (to (Russia) Anzhi Makhachkala)
—	MF	GEO	Jaba Lipartia (to (Russia) Anzhi Makhachkala)
—	FW	UKR	Vladyslav Kulach (loan return to (Ukraine) Shakhtar Donetsk)
—	FW	NGA	Emmanuel Dennis (to (Belgium) Brugge)
—	FW	ARM	Gegham Kadymyan (to (Ukraine) Vorskla Poltava)
—	FW	UKR	Denys Byelousov (to (Ukraine) Avanhard Kramatorsk)
—	FW	UKR	Denys Bezborodko (loan return to (Ukraine) Shakhtar Donetsk)
