= Ivan Yanakov =

Ivan Yanakov may refer to:

- Ivan Yanakov (pianist), Bulgarian pianist
- Ivan Yanakov (footballer) (born 1994), Ukrainian footballer
