= Yanakov =

Yanakov is a surname. Notable people with the surname include:

- Borislav Yanakov, Sambo practitioner representing Bulgaria at the 2015 European Games
- Denis Yanakov (born 1999), Ukrainian footballer
- Ivan Yanakov (pianist) (fl. 2010s), Bulgarian-born pianist and conductor
- Ivan Yanakov (footballer) (born 1994), Ukrainian football midfielder
- Yakim Ivanovich Yanakov (fl. 1980s), commander of the Soviet Air Forces Barnaul Higher Military Aviation School of Pilots, 1983–1987
  - Yanakov, staff logistics officer
  - Yanakov, Grayson Planetary Security commander
  - Anna Yanakov, High Admiral Yanakov's third wife
  - Bernard Yanakov, High Admiral
  - Dietmar Yanakov, historical figure
  - Esther Yanakov, High Admiral Yanakov's second wife
  - Hugh Yanakov, colony ship captain
  - Judah Yanakov, admiral
  - Rachel Yanakov, High Admiral Yanakov's first wife.
