= Cristian Castells =

Spanish footballer (born 1984)

Personal information
- Full name: Cristian Castells Ortega
- Date of birth: 19 October 1984 (age 42)
- Place of birth: Sueca, Spain
- Height: 1.89 m (6 ft 2 1/2 in)
- Position: Centre-back

Youth career
- 1994–1998: Sueca
- 1998–2003: Valencia

Senior career*
Years	Team	Apps	(Gls)
2003–2007	Valencia B	37	(0)
2004–2005	→ Eldense (loan)		
2005–2006	→ Villajoyosa (loan)	23	(0)
2007–2008	Poli Ejido	30	(3)
2008–2009	Alicante	28	(0)
2009–2010	Alavés	31	(2)
2010–2011	Melilla	15	(1)
2011	Pontevedra	14	(1)
2011–2013	Burgos	58	(4)
2013	Platanias	4	(0)
2014	Cullera	20	(1)
2014–2015	Terracina		
2015	Sueca	1	(0)
2015–2016	Recambios Colón	5	(0)
2016	Ceahlăul	10	(0)
2016	Derry City	3	(0)
2016–2018	Torre Levante	60	(5)
2018–2020	Carcaixent	41	(0)
2020–2021	Independiente Alicante	24	(3)
2021–2022	Jávea	18	(0)
2022	Carcaixent	7	(0)
Total		429	(20)

Managerial career
- 2018: Torre Levante
- * Club domestic league appearances and goals

Cristian Castells Ortega (born 19 October 1984) is a Spanish former footballer who played as a central defender.

== Club career ==
Castells was born in Sueca, Valencian Community. An unsuccessful youth graduate of Valencia CF, he spent most of his career in the Segunda División B, also having Segunda División spells with Polideportivo Ejido and Alicante CF, both ended in relegation.

Midway through the 2012–13 season, at already 28, Castells had his first top-flight experience, when he signed for Platanias F.C. in the Super League Greece. In January 2014, however, after only six competitive matches, he returned to his country and his native region, joining amateurs CF Cullera.

Castells rarely settled in the following years, representing Spanish amateur clubs and professional teams in Romania (Liga II) and Northern Ireland. Early into the 2018–19 campaign, he served as manager of CF Torre Levante in the Tercera División.

== Personal life ==
Castells' younger brother, Marc, was also a footballer. A midfielder, he also represented Poli Ejido, but spent the vast majority of his career in the lower leagues.
