= Adel Gafaiti =

Algerian footballer (born 1994)

Personal information
- Full name: Adel Mohamed Nourredine Gafaiti
- Date of birth: 16 July 1994 (age 32)
- Place of birth: Nanterre, France
- Height: 1.85 m (6 ft 1 in)
- Position: Centre-back

Youth career
- –2011: Nancy
- 2011–2012: Rangers
- 2012–2013: Norwich City

Senior career*
Years	Team	Apps	(Gls)
2013–2016	Norwich City	0	(0)
2014	→ Oldham Athletic (loan)	1	(0)
2016	MC Oran	1	(0)
2017	Noisy-le-Sec	7	(0)
2017	Rodéo	12	(0)
2018	Zirka Kropyvnytskyi	8	(0)
2018	Mousehole		
2018–2019	Yeovil Town	22	(1)
2019–2020	Truro City	22	(1)
2020	Wealdstone	0	(0)
2020	Hayes & Yeading United	1	(0)
2021	NK Tomislav Drnje	13	(2)
2021–2022	NK Sesvete	15	(1)

International career
2012	Algeria U20	1	(0)
- * Club domestic league appearances and goals

Adel Mohamed Nourredine Gafaiti (born 16 July 1994) is a professional footballer who plays as a centre-back. Born in France, he represented Algeria at youth international level.

== Early career ==
=== Rangers ===
Gafaiti began his career in the youth team at Nancy before joining Rangers in 2011, for whom he also played youth team football. However, after only one season in Scotland, Gafaiti was among nine players to be released upon their contract coming to an end in the summer due to the ongoing process of the club's administration.

=== Norwich City ===
During summer 2012, Gafaiti moved to Premier League side Norwich City from Rangers. He made 24 appearances for the Norwich U-21 side. On 1 July 2013, he was called up to the senior squad but made no appearances. Despite not making a first team appearance, Gafaiti was linked a move away from Norwich City, as clubs from Europe were keen to sign him.

During the January 2014 transfer window, Gafaiti moved to Football League One side Oldham Athletic on a season long loan. He made his debut on 22 March 2014 on a 1–0 home victory against Crawley Town, coming on in added time. Only just making one appearance, it was announced on 22 April that Gafaiti had returned to his parent club. After returning to his Norwich City, Gafaiti signed a two-year contract. Gafaiti continued to be in the club's development squad until his release at the end of the 2015–16 season.

=== MC Oran ===
After leaving Norwich City, Gafaiti moved to Algeria, signing for MC Oran.

=== Yeovil Town ===
In September 2018, Gafaiti returned to England to join the Endorsed Academy and signed for its partner club South West Peninsula League Division One side Mousehole. On 24 November 2018, Gafaiti signed for EFL League Two side Yeovil Town on a short-term contract. At the end of the 2018–19 season, Gafaiti was released by Yeovil following the club's relegation from the Football League.

== International career ==
Gafaiti chose to represent Algeria at international level, and was capped at the under-20 level.

== Career statistics ==
As of match played 26 February 2022.

Appearances and goals by club, season and competition
Club	Season	League			National Cup (Note: Includes FA Cup, Ukrainian Cup, Croatian Football Cup)		League Cup		Other		Total	
Club	Season	Division	Apps	Goals	Apps	Goals	Apps	Goals	Apps	Goals	Apps	Goals
Norwich City	2013–14	Premier League	0	0	0	0	0	0	—		0	0
Norwich City	2014–15	EFL Championship	0	0	0	0	0	0	—		0	0
Norwich City	2015–16	Premier League	0	0	0	0	0	0	—		0	0
Norwich City	Total		0	0	0	0	0	0	—		0	0
Oldham Athletic (loan)	2013–14	EFL League One	1	0	—		—		—		1	0
MC Oran	2016–17	Ligue Professionnelle 1	1	0	0	0	—		—		1	0
Noisy-le-Sec	2016–17	CFA 2	7	0	0	0	—		—		7	0
Rodéo	2017–18	Championnat National 3	12	0	0	0	—		—		12	0
Zirka Kropyvnytskyi	2017–18	Ukrainian Premier League	8	0	1	0	—		—		9	0
Yeovil Town	2018–19	EFL League Two	22	1	—		—		—		22	1
Truro City	2019–20	Southern Premier South	22	1	1	0	—		4 (Note: One appearance in FA Trophy, three appearances in Southern League Cup)	0	27	1
Wealdstone	2020–21	National League	0	0	0	0	—		0	0	0	0
Hayes & Yeading United	2020–21	Southern Premier South	1	0	2	0	—		1 (Note: Appearance in FA Trophy)	0	4	0
NK Sesvete	2021–22	Croatian Second Football League	15	1	1	0	—		—		16	1
Career total			89	3	5	0	0	0	5	0	99	3
