= Oleksandr Matkobozhyk =

Ukrainian footballer

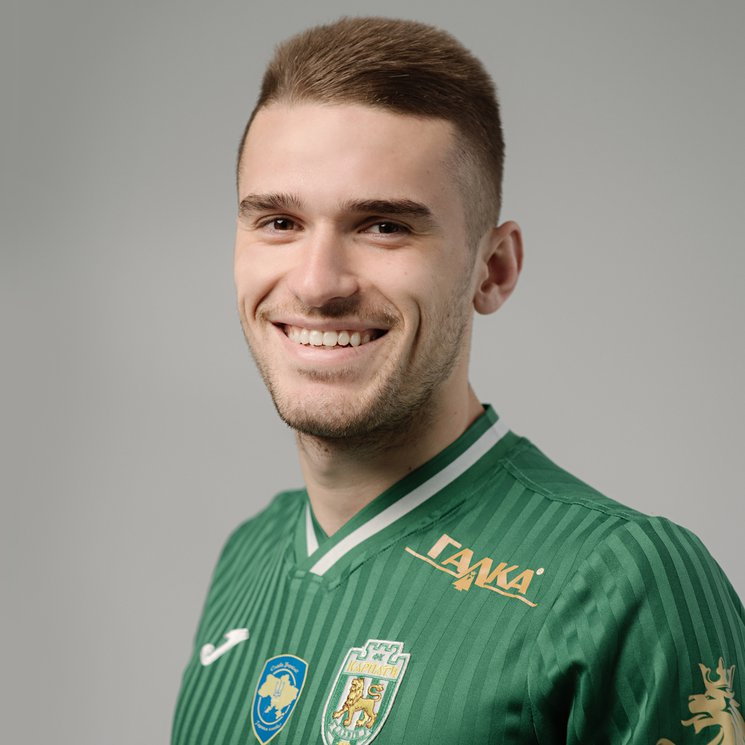

Personal information
- Full name: Oleksandr Ivanovych Matkobozhyk
- Date of birth: 3 January 1998 (age 28)
- Place of birth: Kovel, Ukraine
- Height: 1.84 m (6 ft 0 in)
- Position: Defender

Youth career
- 200?–2011: Youth Sportive School Liublynets
- 2011–2015: BRW-VIK Volodymyr-Volynskyi

Senior career*
Years	Team	Apps	(Gls)
2015–2018	Zirka Kropyvnytskyi	27	(0)
2019	Volyn Lutsk	0	(0)
2019–2021	Mynai	30	(0)
2021–2022	Karpaty Lviv	7	(0)
2022–2023	Veres Rivne	3	(1)
2023	Metalist Kharkiv	12	(0)
2024	FSC Mariupol	0	(0)

International career^{‡}
2014	Ukraine U16	3	(0)
2017–	Ukraine U19	2	(0)
- * Club domestic league appearances and goals as of 3 July 2024 ‡ National team caps and goals as of 2 March 2017

Oleksandr Ivanovych Matkobozhyk (Ukrainian: Олександр Іванович Маткобожик; born 3 January 1998) is a Ukrainian professional footballer who plays as a defender.

== Career ==
Matkobozhyk is a product of Youth Sportive School in his native Liublynets (his first trainer was Yuriy Mazur) and BRW-VIK Volodymyr-Volynskyi. In summer 2015 he signed a contract with FC Zirka in the Ukrainian First League.

He made his debut for FC Zirka Kropyvnytskyi in the Ukrainian Premier League as a substituted player in a match against FC Vorskla Poltava on 16 October 2016.
