= Mykyta Khodakovskyi =

Ukrainian footballer

Personal information
- Full name: Mykyta Bohdanovych Khodakovskyi
- Date of birth: 18 October 1996 (age 30)
- Place of birth: Dnipro, Ukraine
- Height: 1.87 m (6 ft 2 in)
- Positions: Attacking midfielder; winger

Youth career
- 2007–2008: Dnipro-75 Dnipro
- 2008–2010: MDYuSSh Dnipro
- 2010–2011: Dnipro Dnipro
- 2011–2015: MDYuSSh Dnipro

Senior career*
Years	Team	Apps	(Gls)
2015	Inter Dnipro (amateurs)	5	(0)
2016	Oleksandriya	0	(0)
2017	Stal Kamianske	0	(0)
2018	Zirka Kropyvnytskyi	3	(0)
2018–2019	Hirnyk-Sport Horishni Plavni	8	(0)
2019	Dinaz-2 Vyshhorod (amateurs)	8	(3)
2019	Bukovyna Chernivtsi	8	(0)
2020	Lviv	2	(0)
2021	Krystal Kherson	12	(1)
2021	Olimpik Donetsk	10	(2)
2022-2023	FC Arlanda	22	(10)
- * Club domestic league appearances and goals as of 20 June 2022

Mykyta Bohdanovych Khodakovskyi (Ukrainian: Микита Богданович Ходаковський; born 18 October 1996) is a Ukrainian professional footballer who plays as an attacking midfielder, winger.

== Career ==
Born in Dnipropetrovsk, Khodakovskyi is a product of different sportive schools in his native city.

He spent his career with different Ukrainian teams, including Ukrainian Premier League sides and made his debut in the league playing for Zirka Kropyvnytskyi as a second half-time substituted player in the losing away match against Oleksandriya on 6 May 2018.
