= Taras Kacharaba =

Ukrainian footballer

Personal information
- Full name: Taras Ivanovych Kacharaba
- Date of birth: 7 January 1995 (age 31)
- Place of birth: Zhydachiv, Ukraine
- Height: 1.89 m (6 ft 2 in)
- Position: Centre-back

Team information
- Current team: DAC Dunajská Streda
- Number: 33

Youth career
- 2008–2012: UFK Lviv

Senior career*
Years	Team	Apps	(Gls)
2012–2019	Shakhtar Donetsk	0	(0)
2012	→ Shakhtar-3 Donetsk	18	(0)
2014–2015	→ Hoverla Uzhhorod (loan)	14	(1)
2017	→ Zirka Kropyvnytskyi (loan)	16	(0)
2018–2019	→ Slovan Liberec (loan)	39	(1)
2019–2021	Slovan Liberec	42	(2)
2021	→ Slavia Prague (loan)	24	(1)
2022–2024	Slavia Prague	27	(1)
2024–	DAC Dunajská Streda	68	(0)

International career^{‡}
2010–2011	Ukraine U16	16	(0)
2010–2012	Ukraine U17	20	(0)
2012–2013	Ukraine U18	11	(1)
2013–2014	Ukraine U19	7	(0)
2015	Ukraine U20	10	(0)
2016	Ukraine U21	9	(0)
2021–	Ukraine	2	(0)
- * Club domestic league appearances and goals as of 21 September 2026 ‡ National team caps and goals as of 8 June 2022

Taras Ivanovych Kacharaba (Ukrainian: Тарас Іванович Качараба; born 7 January 1995) is a Ukrainian professional footballer who plays as a centre-back for DAC Dunajská Streda.

== Club career ==
Kacharaba was born in Zhydachiv, Lviv Oblast, Ukraine. He is a product of the UFK Lviv youth sportive school and signed a contract with FC Shakhtar Donetsk in the Ukrainian Premier League in 2012.

On 7 February 2024, Kacharaba signed a two-and-a-half-year contract with DAC Dunajská Streda.

== International career ==
He was called up to play for the 23-man squad of the Ukraine national under-19 football team by trainer Oleksandr Petrakov in the UEFA European Under-19 Championship in July 2014.

He made his Ukraine national football team debut on 8 September 2021 in a friendly against the Czech Republic, a 1–1 away draw.

== Career statistics ==
=== Club ===
As of 5 June 2022

Club	Season	League			Cup		Continental		Other		Total	
Club	Season	Division	Apps	Goals	Apps	Goals	Apps	Goals	Apps	Goals	Apps	Goals
Shakhtar-3 Donetsk	2011–12	Ukrainian Second League	7	0	—		—		—		7	0
Shakhtar-3 Donetsk	2012–13	Ukrainian Second League	11	0	—		—		—		11	0
Shakhtar-3 Donetsk	Total		18	0	—		—		—		18	0
Hoverla Uzhhorod (loan)	2014–15	Ukrainian Premier League	14	1	3	0	—		—		17	1
Zirka Kropyvnytskyi (loan)	2017–18	Ukrainian Premier League	16	0	0	0	—		—		16	0
Slovan Liberec (loan)	2017–18	Czech First League	8	0	1	0	—		—		9	0
Slovan Liberec (loan)	2018–19	Czech First League	31	1	4	1	—		—		35	2
Slovan Liberec (loan)	Total		39	1	5	1	—		—		44	2
Slovan Liberec	2019–20	Czech First League	32	0	4	0	—		—		36	0
Slovan Liberec	2020–21	Czech First League	10	2	0	0	7 (Note: Appearance(s) in UEFA Europa League)	1	—		17	3
Slovan Liberec	Total		42	2	4	0	7	1	—		53	3
Slavia Prague (loan)	2020–21	Czech First League	10	0	2	0	—		—		12	0
Slavia Prague (loan)	2021–22	Czech First League	14	1	1	0	7 (Note: Two appearances in UEFA Champions League, five appearances in UEFA Europa Conference League)	0	—		22	1
Slavia Prague (loan)	Total		24	1	3	0	7	0	—		34	1
Slavia Prague	2021–22	Czech First League	7	0	1	0	4 (Note: Appearance(s) in UEFA Europa Conference League)	0	—		12	0
Career total			160	5	16	1	18	1	0	0	184	7

=== International ===
As of 8 June 2022

National team	Year	Caps	Goals
Ukraine	2021	1	0
Ukraine	2022	1	0
Total		2	0
