= Artem Syomka =

Ukrainian footballer

Personal information
- Full name: Artem Viktorovych Syomka
- Date of birth: 18 February 1998 (age 28)
- Place of birth: Bila Tserkva, Ukraine
- Height: 1.81 m (5 ft 11 in)
- Position: Left winger

Team information
- Current team: Ahrobiznes Volochysk
- Number: 20

Youth career
- 2011–2012: Arsenal Bila Tserkva
- 2012–2013: Illichivets Mariupol
- 2014–2015: Arsenal Bila Tserkva
- 2017: ARZ Bila Tserkva

Senior career*
Years	Team	Apps	(Gls)
2015–2018	Arsenal Bila Tserkva	39	(1)
2018–2019	Zirka Kropyvnytskyi	17	(0)
2019	Hirnyk Kryvyi Rih	10	(1)
2020	Lokomotiv Yerevan	9	(2)
2020–2021	Peremoha Dnipro	8	(2)
2021–2023	Hirnyk-Sport Horishni Plavni	48	(4)
2023–2024	Prykarpattia Ivano-Frankivsk	27	(1)
2025–	Ahrobiznes Volochysk	37	(1)
- * Club domestic league appearances and goals as of 3 June 2026

Artem Viktorovych Syomka (Ukrainian: Артем Вікторович Сьомка; born 18 February 1998) is a Ukrainian professional footballer who plays as a left winger for Ukrainian club Ahrobiznes Volochysk.
