= Yaroslav Yampol =

Ukrainian footballer (born 1990)

Personal information
- Full name: Yaroslav Hennadiyovych Yampol
- Date of birth: 21 April 1990 (age 36)
- Place of birth: Svatove, Soviet Union (now Ukraine)
- Height: 1.75 m (5 ft 9 in)
- Position: Attacking midfielder

Team information
- Current team: Hetman Zamość
- Number: 40

Youth career
- 2002–2006: Mriya Kupyansk
- 2006–2007: Shakhtar Donetsk

Senior career*
Years	Team	Apps	(Gls)
2007–2010	Shakhtar Donetsk	0	(0)
2007–2010	→ Shakhtar-3 Donetsk	56	(7)
2008	→ Komunalnyk Luhansk (loan)	13	(0)
2011–2012	Dinamo Minsk	16	(0)
2013–2014	Avanhard Kramatorsk	13	(4)
2014	Oleksandriya	4	(1)
2015	Hirnyk Kryvyi Rih	30	(5)
2016–2017	Cherkaskyi Dnipro	37	(0)
2017	Sumy	14	(1)
2018	Zirka Kropyvnytskyi	6	(0)
2018	Hirnyk-Sport Horishni Plavni	11	(0)
2019–2021	Metalist 1925 Kharkiv	41	(11)
2021–2022	Hirnyk-Sport Horishni Plavni	14	(2)
2022	Podillya Khmelnytskyi	0	(0)
2022–2024	Świt Nowy Dwór Mazowiecki	60	(20)
2024	Olimpia Grudziądz	7	(0)
2024–2025	Świt Nowy Dwór Mazowiecki	22	(2)
2025–	Hetman Zamość	29	(4)

International career
2007	Ukraine U17	3	(0)
2007	Ukraine U18	3	(0)
- * Club domestic league appearances and goals as of 08:24, 26 June 2026 (UTC)

Yaroslav Hennadiyovych Yampol (Ukrainian: Ярослав Геннадійович Ямполь; born 21 April 1990) is a Ukrainian professional footballer who plays as an attacking midfielder for III liga club Hetman Zamość.

== Career ==
Yampol was the member of various Ukrainian national youth football teams. He was included in Ukraine national under-21 football team preliminarily squad for 2013 UEFA European Under-21 Football Championship but got cut from the final squad.

Playing for FC Metalist 1925 Kharkiv, Yampol was recognized as the best player of August 2019 in the Ukrainian First League by PFL. He became a second player of Metalist 1925 to receive such honors.

== Honours ==
Hetman Zamość

- IV liga Lublin: 2025–26
- Polish Cup (Zamość regionals): 2025–26
