= Kyrylo Dryshlyuk =

Ukrainian footballer

Personal information
- Full name: Kyrylo Pavlovych Dryshlyuk
- Date of birth: 16 September 1999 (age 27)
- Place of birth: Boryspil, Ukraine
- Height: 1.82 m (6 ft 0 in)
- Position: Midfielder

Team information
- Current team: Zorya Luhansk
- Number: 8

Youth career
- 2010–2016: Dynamo Kyiv

Senior career*
Years	Team	Apps	(Gls)
2016–2018	Zirka Kropyvnytskyi	26	(0)
2018–2023	Oleksandriya	30	(0)
2020	→ Spartaks Jūrmala (loan)	23	(1)
2023–	Zorya Luhansk	65	(0)

International career^{‡}
2017	Ukraine U18	2	(0)
2017–2018	Ukraine U19	13	(0)
2018–2019	Ukraine U20	8	(0)
Medal record
Men's football
Representing Ukraine
UEFA European Under-19 Championship
Bronze medal – third place	2018 Finland
FIFA U-20 World Cup
Winner	2019 Poland
- * Club domestic league appearances and goals as of 3 June 2026 ‡ National team caps and goals as of 26 October 2021

Kyrylo Pavlovych Dryshlyuk (Ukrainian: Кирило Павлович Дришлюк; born 16 September 1999) is a Ukrainian professional footballer who plays as a midfielder for Zorya Luhansk in the Ukrainian Premier League.

== Career ==
Dryshlyuk is a product of the FC Dynamo Kyiv Youth Sportive School System.

In summer 2016 he signed contract with the new promoted to the Ukrainian Premier League FC Zirka Kropyvnytskyi. Dryshlyuk made his debut for FC Zirka in the match against FC Stal Kamianske on 23 April 2017 in the Ukrainian Premier League.

== Honours ==
=== International ===
==== Ukraine U20 ====
- FIFA U-20 World Cup: 2019

== Personal life ==
His father, captain Pavlo Dryshlyuk (1973–2014) was killed during Russian-Ukrainian War in the Sloviansk Raion of the Donetsk Oblast.
