= Maksym Pryadun =

Ukrainian footballer (born 1997)

Personal information
- Full name: Maksym Oleksandrovych Pryadun
- Date of birth: 17 February 1997 (age 29)
- Place of birth: Uman, Ukraine
- Height: 1.76 m (5 ft 9 in)
- Position: Striker

Youth career
- 2010–2011: Olimpik Kirovohrad
- 2011–2014: Illichivets Mariupol

Senior career*
Years	Team	Apps	(Gls)
2014–2015	Illichivets Mariupol	0	(0)
2016	Vorskla Poltava	0	(0)
2017–2018	Zirka Kropyvnytskyi	24	(5)
2018	Arsenal Kyiv	0	(0)
2019	Metalist 1925 Kharkiv	7	(0)
2020	Lokomotiv Yerevan	10	(8)
2020–2021	Mykolaiv	10	(0)
2020–2021	→ Mykolaiv-2	3	(0)
2021–2022	Olimpik Donetsk	17	(5)
2022–2023	Metalist Kharkiv	28	(9)
2023–2024	LNZ Cherkasy	20	(3)
2025	Sliema Wanderers	13	(2)
2025–2026	Phnom Penh Crown	26	(11)
- * Club domestic league appearances and goals as of 11 May 2026

Maksym Oleksandrovych Pryadun (Ukrainian: Максим Олександрович Прядун; born 17 February 1997) is a Ukrainian professional footballer who plays as a striker for Cambodian Premier League club Phnom Penh Crown.

== Career ==
Maksym Pryadun was born in Uman. Pryadun is a product of FC Olimpik Kirovohrad and FC Illichivets youth sportive school systems. Then he signed a professional contract with FC Illichivets Mariupol in the Ukrainian Premier League.

He made his debut for FC Zirka as a substituted player in the second half-time in the match against FC Volyn Lutsk on 20 May 2017 in the Ukrainian Premier League. Next season in August 2017, Pryadun was recognized as a player of the month in the Ukrainian Premier League.

== Honours ==
Individual

- Ukrainian Premier League player of the Month: 2017–18 (August)
