= Julian Rullier =

French footballer (born 1990)

Personal information
- Full name: Julian Lamine Serge Daniel Rullier
- Date of birth: 4 April 1990 (age 36)
- Place of birth: Nice, France
- Height: 1.77 m (5 ft 10 in)
- Position: Midfielder

Team information
- Current team: Elverum

Senior career*
Years	Team	Apps	(Gls)
2009-2010	FK Ventspils	0	(0)
2009-2010	→ FC Tranzit (loan)	12	(1)
2011-2012	P.A.O. Rouf	14	(3)
2012	FK Atlantas	14	(0)
	Al-Orouba SC	1	(0)
- AS Monaco FC III
2017–2018	Zirka Kropyvnytskyi	4	(0)
2019	Nybergsund IL-Trysil	26	(9)
2020	Elverum	0	(0)
2020	Volyn Lutsk	4	(0)
2021–	Elverum		
- * Club domestic league appearances and goals

Julian Rullier (born 4 April 1990) is a French footballer.

Started at As Monaco academy, He played in Latvia, Lithuania and Greece before having two spells in the Ukrainian Premier League. In between he also played for Nybergsund on the Norwegian fourth tier.
