= Hicham El Hamdaoui =

French footballer (born 1995)

Personal information
- Full name: Hichem Mohamed El Hamdaoui
- Date of birth: 18 November 1995 (age 30)
- Place of birth: Nice, France
- Height: 1.83 m (6 ft 0 in)
- Position: Forward

Youth career
- 2000–2011: Cavigal
- 2011–2014: Nice

Senior career*
| Years | Team | Apps | (Gls) |
| 2012–2016 | Nice | 0 | (0) |
| 2012–2015 | → Nice B | 12 | (0) |
| 2017 | Tertre Hautrage | | |
| 2017–2018 | Zirka Kropyvnytskyi | 6 | (2) |
| 2018 | Daco-Getica București | 2 | (0) |
| 2019 | Torpedo Minsk | 1 | (0) |
| 2019–2020 | Bra | 8 | (2) |
| 2021–2022 | Villefranche SJB | 7 | (0) |
- * Club domestic league appearances and goals as of 31 July 2022

Hichem Mohamed El Hamdaoui (born 18 November 1995) is a professional French football striker.

== Career ==
Born in Nice, El Hamdaoui is a product of his native OGC Nice youth sportive system, but he played only 11 games for it reserves team in the Championnat National 2. In 2017 he was transferred to Belgium team Tertre Hautrage.

In August 2017 he signed a two-year contract with the Ukrainian Premier League club Zirka Kropyvnytskyi. He made his debut in the Ukrainian Premier League for FC Zirka on 20 August 2017, playing in a match against FC Zorya Luhansk.

In March 2019, he signed a one-year contract with Torpedo Minsk.

== Personal life ==
Born in France, El Hamdaoui is of Moroccan descent.
