= Vyacheslav Panfilov =

Ukrainian footballer

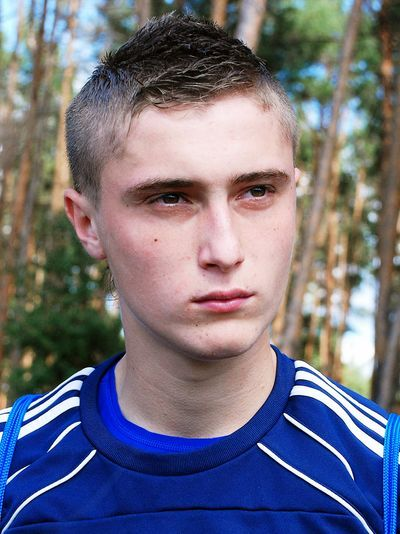
- Panfilov in 2011

Personal information
- Full name: Vyacheslav Vyacheslavovych Panfilov
- Date of birth: 24 June 1993 (age 33)
- Place of birth: Kyiv, Ukraine
- Height: 1.79 m (5 ft 10 in)
- Position: Forward

Youth career
- 1999–2011: Dynamo Kyiv

Senior career*
Years	Team	Apps	(Gls)
2011–2016	Dynamo Kyiv	0	(0)
2013–2014	→ Dynamo-2 Kyiv (loan)	14	(0)
2014	→ Hoverla Uzhhorod (loan)	4	(0)
2015	→ Dynamo-2 Kyiv (loan)	18	(3)
2016	Veres Rivne	1	(0)
2017	Utenis Utena	3	(0)
2017	→ Utenis B	2	(0)
2017–2018	Zirka Kropyvnytskyi	6	(0)
2018	Kobra Kharkiv	3	(0)
2018–2019	SC Chaika	8	(1)
2019	Mecklenburg Schwerin II	2	(0)
2019	Mecklenburg Schwerin	1	(0)

International career
2010	Ukraine18	4	(0)
- * Club domestic league appearances and goals as of 01:53, 7 February 2020 (UTC)

Vyacheslav Panfilov (Ukrainian: В'ячеслав В'ячеславович Панфілов; born 24 June 1993) is a Ukrainian footballer who plays as a forward.

== Career ==
Panfilov is a product of the FC Dynamo youth sportive school. His first trainers were Vitaliy Khmelnytskyi and Yevhen Yastrebynskyi.

He spent his career in the Ukrainian First League club FC Dynamo-2 Kyiv. And in July 2014 went on loan for FC Hoverla in the Ukrainian Premier League.

On 8 March 2017 Panfilov joined Lithuanian A Lyga club FK Utenis Utena. He was released by the club on 15 April 2017.

In the summer 2019, Panfilov joined German club FC Mecklenburg Schwerin. He left the club at the end of the year.
