= Gleb Rassadkin =

Belarusian footballer

Personal information
- Date of birth: 5 April 1995 (age 31)
- Place of birth: Minsk, Belarus
- Height: 1.79 m (5 ft 10 1/2 in)
- Position: Forward

Youth career
- 2009–2012: Dinamo Minsk

Senior career*
Years	Team	Apps	(Gls)
2011–2017	Dinamo Minsk	56	(5)
2017–2018	Zirka Kropyvnytskyi	15	(1)
2018	→ Neman Grodno (loan)	13	(1)
2019–2020	Neman Grodno	33	(4)
2021–2022	Vitebsk	38	(3)
2022	Arsenal Dzerzhinsk	14	(1)
2023	Smorgon	19	(3)

International career
2010–2012	Belarus U17	16	(6)
2012–2013	Belarus U19	14	(4)
2012–2016	Belarus U21	19	(1)
- * Club domestic league appearances and goals as of 31 December 2023

Gleb Rassadkin (Belarusian: Глеб Рассадкiн; Russian: Глеб Рассадкин; born 5 April 1995) is a Belarusian professional football player.
