= Serhiy Myakushko =

Ukrainian footballer

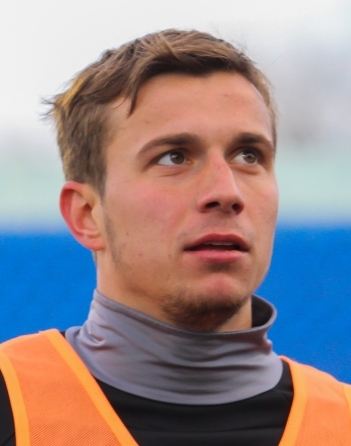

Personal information
- Full name: Serhiy Volodymyrovych Myakushko
- Date of birth: 15 April 1993 (age 33)
- Place of birth: Kyiv, Ukraine
- Height: 1.70 m (5 ft 7 in)
- Position: Midfielder

Team information
- Current team: Vorskla Poltava
- Number: 33

Youth career
- 2006: Vidradnyi Kyiv
- 2007: Atlet Kyiv
- 2008–2010: Obolon Kyiv

Senior career*
Years	Team	Apps	(Gls)
2010–2013	Obolon Kyiv	22	(2)
2012	→ Obolon-2 Kyiv	7	(2)
2013–2017	Dynamo Kyiv	4	(0)
2013–2014	→ Dynamo-2 Kyiv	32	(8)
2014–2015	→ Hoverla Uzhhorod (loan)	19	(5)
2017	→ Vorskla Poltava (loan)	14	(1)
2017–2019	Karpaty Lviv	56	(13)
2019–2020	Alcorcón	16	(0)
2020–2021	Podbeskidzie Bielsko-Biała	15	(0)
2021–2022	Mynai	3	(0)
2022–2024	Kolos Kovalivka	38	(2)
2024–26	Vorskla Poltava	32	(5)
2026-	FC Lokomotyv Kyiv	1	(0)

International career
2011–2012	Ukraine U19	5	(0)
2013–2014	Ukraine U21	16	(1)
2017	Ukraine	1	(0)
- * Club domestic league appearances and goals as of 1 June 2025

Serhiy Volodymyrovych Myakushko (Ukrainian: Сергій Володимирович Мякушко; born 15 April 1993) is a Ukrainian professional footballer who plays as a midfielder for Vorskla Poltava.

== Career ==
Myakushko is a product of various Kyiv city youth football clubs including the Obolon Kyiv and Dynamo Kyiv academies.

He made his debut for Obolon entering as a substitute in a match against Dynamo Kyiv on 22 July 2011 in the Ukrainian Premier League.

In February 2013, he signed a contract with Dynamo Kyiv in the Ukrainian Premier League.

From 2017 to 2019, Myakushko played for the Carpathian region club Karpaty. In May 2019 he was recognized as a player of the month in the Ukrainian Premier League.

In July 2019, he signed a contract with the Segunda División club AD Alcorcon.

== International career ==
From 2011 to 2014 Myakushko played for Ukraine at under-19 and under-21 level.

== Honours ==
Dynamo Kyiv

- Ukrainian Premier League: 2015–16

Individual

- Ukrainian Premier League Player of the Month: May 2019
