= Arnaud Guedj =

French footballer (born 1997)

Personal information
- Date of birth: 19 July 1997 (age 29)
- Place of birth: Le Mans, France
- Height: 1.74 m (5 ft 9 in)
- Position: Midfielder

Team information
- Current team: Châteaubriant
- Number: 22

Youth career
- 2004–2008: CSC du Mans
- 2008–2014: Le Mans

Senior career*
Years	Team	Apps	(Gls)
2015–2017	Nice B	16	(0)
2017–2018	Zirka Kropyvnytskyi	26	(0)
2018–2019	Skënderbeu Korçë	12	(0)
2019	Universitatea Cluj	7	(0)
2020	Blue Boys Muhlenbach	5	(0)
2020–2023	Olympic Charleroi	45	(4)
2024–	Châteaubriant	35	(1)

International career
2013	France U16	3.	(0)
- * Club domestic league appearances and goals as of 4 December 2025

Arnaud Guedj (born 19 July 1997) is a French professional footballer who plays as a midfielder for Championnat National 1 club Châteaubriant.

== Career ==
Born in Le Mans, Guedj is a product of his native Le Mans FC youth sportive system. In 2014, he was transferred to OGC Nice and played 16 games for the reserves in the Championnat National 2.

In July 2017, Guedj signed a two-year contract with the Ukrainian Premier League club Zirka Kropyvnytskyi. He made his debut in the Ukrainian Premier League for FC Zirka on 16 July 2017, playing in a match against FC Karpaty Lviv.
