= Ivan Tsyupa =

Ukrainian footballer (born 1993)

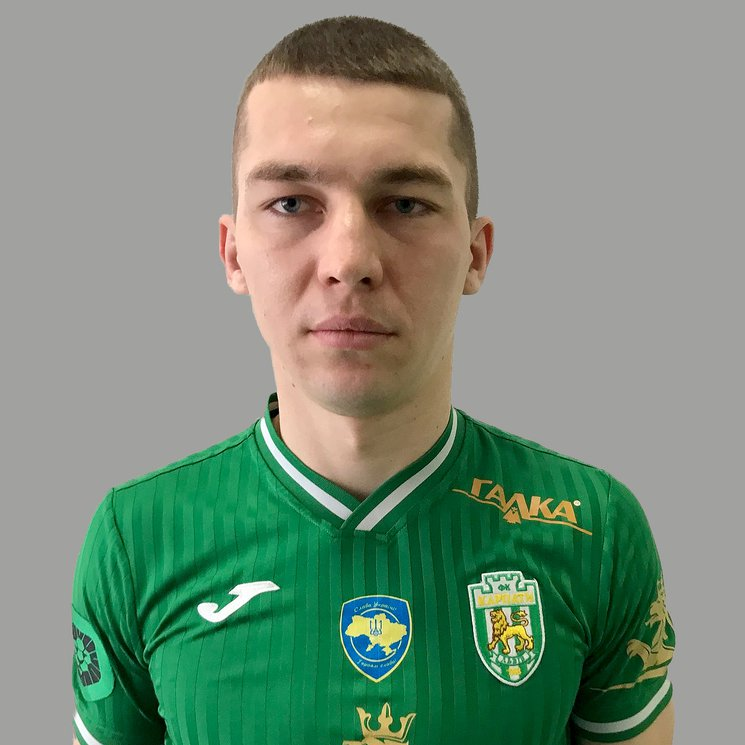
- Tsyupa with Karpaty Lviv

Personal information
- Full name: Ivan Ivanovych Tsyupa
- Date of birth: 25 June 1993 (age 33)
- Place of birth: Yelyzavetivka, Donetsk Oblast, Ukraine
- Height: 1.82 m (6 ft 0 in)
- Position: Left-back

Team information
- Current team: Olimpia Grudziądz
- Number: 93

Youth career
- 2006–2010: Shakhtar Donetsk

Senior career*
Years	Team	Apps	(Gls)
2010–2017	Illichivets Mariupol	71	(1)
2010–2011	Illichivets-2 Mariupol	33	(0)
2017–2018	Zirka Kropyvnytskyi	26	(2)
2018–2022	Volyn Lutsk	93	(5)
2022	Karpaty Lviv	0	(0)
2022–2023	Vranov nad Topľou		(2)
2023–2024	Okzhetpes	26	(0)
2024–	Olimpia Grudziądz	74	(8)
- * Club domestic league appearances and goals as of 16:02, 2 June 2026 (UTC)

Ivan Ivanovych Tsyupa (Ukrainian: Іван Іванович Цюпа; born 25 June 1993) is a Ukrainian professional footballer who plays as a left-back for Polish club Olimpia Grudziądz.

== Career ==
He is product of Shakhtar Donetsk sportive school.

He made his debut for Illichivets Mariupol in the Ukrainian Premier League on 19 May 2013.
