= Marc Castells =

Spanish footballer

Personal information
- Full name: Marc Castells Ortega
- Date of birth: 12 March 1990 (age 36)
- Place of birth: Sueca, Spain
- Height: 1.85 m (6 ft 1 in)
- Position: Defensive midfielder

Team information
- Current team: Ordino
- Number: 14

Youth career
- Valencia

Senior career*
Years	Team	Apps	(Gls)
2009–2012	Valencia B	28	(0)
2009–2010	→ Poli Ejido (loan)	33	(1)
2010–2011	→ Oviedo (loan)	14	(0)
2012–2013	Asteras Tripolis	9	(0)
2014	Larissa	0	(0)
2014–2016	Castellón	50	(1)
2017	Hospitalet	8	(0)
2017	Zirka	2	(0)
2018–2021	Castellón	48	(1)
2021–2022	Linares Deportivo	6	(1)
2022–2023	Olot	16	(0)
2023–2025	Santa Coloma	28	(1)
2025–	Ordino	14	(0)
- * Club domestic league appearances and goals as of 15 June 2026

Marc Castells Ortega (born 12 March 1990) is a Spanish professional footballer who plays as a defensive midfielder for Primera Divisió club FC Ordino.

His older brother, Cristian, was also a footballer.
