= Nazar Malinovskyi =

Ukrainian footballer

Personal information
- Full name: Nazar Vyacheslavovych Malinovskyi
- Date of birth: 18 April 1998 (age 28)
- Place of birth: Pervomaisk, Mykolaiv Oblast, Ukraine
- Height: 1.77 m (5 ft 10 in)
- Position: Defender

Team information
- Current team: Znicz Biała Piska
- Number: 15

Youth career
- 2011–2015: Metalist Kharkiv
- 2016: Aves

Senior career*
Years	Team	Apps	(Gls)
2015–2016	Metalist Kharkiv	0	(0)
2017	Metalist 1925 Kharkiv (amateurs)	5	(0)
2017–2018	Zirka Kropyvnytskyi	2	(0)
2019	Kremin Kremenchuk	17	(0)
2020	Hirnyk Kryvyi Rih	0	(0)
2020–2022	Kryvbas Kryvyi Rih	23	(1)
2022	→ Olimpia Zambrów (loan)	13	(11)
2022–2023	Olimpia Zambrów	24	(4)
2023–	Znicz Biała Piska	58	(12)

International career
2014	Ukraine U16	3	(0)
- * Club domestic league appearances and goals as of 11 August 2023

Nazar Vyacheslavovych Malinovskyi (Ukrainian: Назар В'ячеславович Маліновський; born 18 April 1998) is a Ukrainian professional footballer who plays as a defender for Polish club Znicz Biała Piska.

== Career ==
Malinovskyi is a product of FC Metalist Youth Sportive School System in Kharkiv.

After spending a short time in the Portuguese C.D. Aves, he joined Ukrainian Premier League club Zirka Kropyvnytskyi in the summer of 2017. He made his debut for Zirka as a substituted player in a league match against Dynamo Kyiv on 18 November 2017.

== Honours ==
Olimpia Zambrów

- IV liga Warmia-Masuria: 2021–22

Znicz Biała Piska

- IV liga Warmia-Masuria: 2024–25
