= Danylo Kondrakov =

Ukrainian footballer

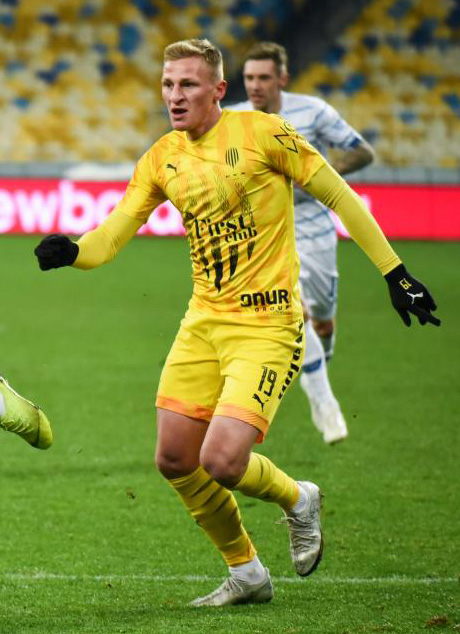
- Kondrakov playing for Rukh Lviv in 2021

Personal information
- Full name: Danylo Serhiyovych Kondrakov
- Date of birth: 19 January 1998 (age 28)
- Place of birth: Luhansk, Ukraine
- Height: 1.82 m (6 ft 0 in)
- Position: Striker

Team information
- Current team: KDV Tomsk
- Number: 9

Youth career
- 2011–2014: Zorya Luhansk
- 2014–2015: Azovstal Mariupol
- 2015: Metalurh Zaporizhzhia

Senior career*
| Years | Team | Apps | (Gls) |
| 2016 | Metalurh Zaporizhzhia | 11 | (0) |
| 2017 | Skala Stryi | 0 | (0) |
| 2017–2018 | Zirka Kropyvnytskyi | 26 | (3) |
| 2019–2022 | Rukh Lviv | 68 | (20) |
| 2022 | Sūduva | 15 | (4) |
| 2023 | Pirin Blagoevgrad | 31 | (6) |
| 2024 | Sliema Wanderers | 11 | (2) |
| 2024–2025 | Botev Vratsa | 15 | (1) |
| 2025 | Hebar Pazardzhik | 9 | (0) |
| 2025– | KDV Tomsk | 40 | (16) |
- * Club domestic league appearances and goals as of 1 November 2026

Danylo Kondrakov (Ukrainian: Данило Сергійович Кондраков; born 19 January 1998) is a Ukrainian professional footballer who plays as a striker for Russian club KDV Tomsk. He also holds Russian citizenship as Daniil Kondrakov (Russian: Даниил Сергеевич Кондраков).

== Career ==
Kondrakov is a product of the FC Zorya Luhansk and FC Azovstal Mariupol youth systems. Due to the 2014 Russian aggression against Ukraine, he moved to Zaporizhia where lived his grandfather, who is a coach of a local women's basketball team. In 2015 Kondrakov trained with DYuSSh Metalurh but never signed a professional contract. Later he played for Metalurh U-19 Zaporizhia and Spartak-KPU in the Student League. In 2016 Kondrakov joined the reformed Metalurh Zaporizhia that restarted in amateurs and led by Illya Blyznyuk. He made his debut in professional football on 13 September 2016 in an away game against FC Real Pharma Odesa in the Second League.

During the winter break of the 2016–17 season, Oleh Lutkov invited Kondrakov to FC Skala Stryi, where he signed with the under-19 team.

He made his debut for FC Zirka Kropyvnytskyi against FC Shakhtar Donetsk on 23 September 2017 in the Ukrainian Premier League.

On 1 April 2019 Kondrakov signed with FC Rukh Vynnyky.

In January 2023, he joined First League club Pirin Blagoevgrad.
