= Serhiy Petrov =

Ukrainian footballer (1997–2026)

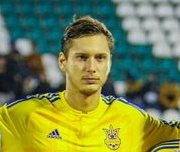
- Petrov in 2016

Personal information
- Full name: Serhiy Volodymyrovych Petrov
- Date of birth: 21 May 1997
- Place of birth: Yevpatoriya, Crimea, Ukraine
- Date of death: 14 February 2026 (aged 28)
- Place of death: near Pokrovsk, Ukraine
- Height: 1.98 m (6 ft 6 in)
- Position: Forward

Youth career
- 2011–2014: BRW-BIK Volodymyr-Volynskyi
- 2014: Volyn Lutsk

Senior career*
Years	Team	Apps	(Gls)
2014–2017	Volyn Lutsk	45	(4)
2017–2018	Zirka Kropyvnytskyi	15	(3)
2018	Lviv	2	(0)
2019	Rukh Vynnyky	1	(0)
2019	Metalist 1925 Kharkiv	2	(0)
2020–2021	Ahrobiznes Volochysk	36	(5)

International career
2013	Ukraine U16	3	(0)
2016	Ukraine U21	1	(0)
- * Club domestic league appearances and goals

Serhiy Volodymyrovych Petrov (Ukrainian: Сергій Володимирович Петров; 21 May 1997 – 14 February 2026) was a Ukrainian professional footballer who played as a forward.

== Career ==
Petrov attended the different Sportive youth schools in Volyn Oblast. He made his debut for Volyn Lutsk playing in a main-squad in the game against Dnipro Dnipropetrovsk on 1 March 2015 in the Ukrainian Premier League.

After the Russian invasion of Ukraine, Petrov returned to his native Crimea, where he briefly played for local teams there until he started playing for teams in Uzbekistan, including FC Mash'al and FC Kokand 1912. The last team he played for was "Tavriya‑Energo", a local amateur club within the occupied areas of Ukraine.

== Death ==
Petrov joined the Russian army in summer 2025 and was killed in action on 14 February 2026 in the Russo-Ukrainian war. He was 28.
