= Cécé Pepe =

French footballer (born 1996)

Personal information
- Full name: Cécé Franck Pepe
- Date of birth: 9 November 1996 (age 30)
- Place of birth: Clichy, Hauts-de-Seine, France
- Position: Defender

Youth career
- –2014: Paris Saint-Germain
- 2014–2015: Marseille

Senior career*
Years	Team	Apps	(Gls)
2015–2017	Marseille II	4	(0)
2017–2018	Zirka Kropyvnytskyi	11	(0)
2018–2019	Rieti	15	(1)
2019–2020	Livingston	2	(0)

International career^{‡}
2011	France U16	6	(0)
- * Club domestic league appearances and goals as of 13:39, 23 August 2020 (UTC) ‡ National team caps and goals as of 23 August 2017

Cécé Franck Pepe (born 9 November 1996) is a French professional footballer who plays as a defender, most recently for Scottish club Livingston whom he left in August 2020.

== Career ==
Born in Clichy, Hauts-de-Seine, Pepe is a product of the Paris Saint-Germain youth system. In 2014, he transferred to Marseille, but played only for the reserve team in the Championnat National 2.

=== Zirka Kropyvnytskyi ===
In August 2017, Pepe signed a two-year contract with Ukrainian Premier League club Zirka Kropyvnytskyi. He made his debut in the Ukrainian Premier League for FC Zirka on 11 August 2017, playing in a match against FC Dynamo Kyiv.

=== Rieti ===
On 30 August 2018, Pepe signed a two-year contract with Italian Serie C side Rieti. He was released from his contract by mutual consent on 11 February 2019.

=== Livingston ===
In June 2019, he signed for Scottish club Livingston. On 21 August 2020, he was released by the club.
