= Ivan Yanakov (footballer) =

Ukrainian footballer

Personal information
- Full name: Ivan Fedorovych Yanakov
- Date of birth: 7 July 1994 (age 32)
- Place of birth: Yenakiieve, Ukraine
- Height: 1.74 m (5 ft 8 1/2 in)
- Position: Midfielder

Team information
- Current team: Dnipro Cherkasy
- Number: 77

Youth career
- 2008: DYFA VAT YMZ Yenakiyeve
- 2008–2011: Illichivets Mariupol

Senior career*
Years	Team	Apps	(Gls)
2011–2017	Illichivets Mariupol	15	(0)
2011–2012	→ Illichivets-2 Mariupol	17	(0)
2016	→ Illichivets-2 Mariupol	11	(6)
2017	→ Poltava (loan)	4	(0)
2017–2020	Kremin Kremenchuk	39	(4)
2020	Yarud Mariupol	8	(1)
2021–	Dnipro Cherkasy	0	(0)
- * Club domestic league appearances and goals as of 3 September 2020

Ivan Yanakov (Ukrainian: Іван Федорович Янаков; born 7 July 1994), is a professional Ukrainian football midfielder who plays for Dnipro Cherkasy.

== Career ==
He is product of the Yenakiyeve sportive academy and FC Illichivets Mariupol sportive school.

He made his début for FC Illichivets Mariupol in the Ukrainian Premier League on 20 September 2014.
