= 2017–18 FC Mariupol season =

FC Mariupol
2017–18 season
- President: Pavlo Rozumnyi
- Manager: Oleksandr Sevidov (until 22 September 2017); Oleksandr Babych (since 22 September 2017)
- Stadium: Volodymyr Boiko Stadium
- Ukrainian Premier League: 5th
- Ukrainian Cup: Semifinal
- Top goalscorer: League: Andriy Boryachuk (5); All: Andriy Boryachuk (8)
Home colours	Away colours

The 2017–18 season was FC Mariupol's 18th season in the top Ukrainian football league. Mariupol competed in Premier League and Ukrainian Cup.

== Players ==
=== Squad information ===
As of 31 May 2018

Squad no.	Name	Nationality	Position	Date of birth (age)
Goalkeepers
1	Yevhen Halchuk	(Ukraine)	GK	5 March 1992 (aged 26)
12	Rustam Khudzhamov	(Ukraine)	GK	5 October 1982 (aged 35)
14	Ihor Levchenko	(Ukraine)	GK	23 February 1991 (aged 27)
Defenders
2	Oleksiy Bykov ^{List B}	(Ukraine)	DF	29 March 1998 (aged 20)
4	Yevhen Neplyakh	(Ukraine)	DF	11 May 1992 (aged 26)
5	Joyskim Dawa	(Cameroon) (France)	DF	9 April 1996 (aged 22)
13	Serhiy Yavorskyi	(Ukraine)	DF	5 July 1989 (aged 28)
20	Ihor Kyryukhantsev (on loan from Shakhtar Donetsk)	(Ukraine)	DF	29 January 1996 (aged 22)
23	Oleksandr Nasonov	(Ukraine)	DF	28 April 1992 (aged 26)
27	Besir Demiri	(North Macedonia)	DF	1 August 1994 (aged 23)
30	Maksym Bilyi	(Ukraine)	DF	21 June 1990 (aged 27)
	Vladyslav Savin ^{List B}	(Ukraine)	DF	7 July 1997 (aged 20)
Midfielders
7	Danylo Ihnatenko (on loan from Shakhtar Donetsk)	(Ukraine)	MF	13 March 1997 (aged 21)
8	Artur Murza ^{List B}	(Ukraine)	MF	13 July 2000 (aged 17)
9	Dmytro Myshnyov (Captain)	(Ukraine)	MF	26 January 1994 (aged 24)
11	Vyacheslav Churko (on loan from Shakhtar Donetsk)	(Ukraine) (Hungary)	MF	10 May 1993 (aged 25)
17	Roger Gomis	(Senegal)	MF	20 March 1995 (aged 23)
19	Ihor Tyschenko	(Ukraine)	MF	11 May 1989 (aged 29)
22	Andriy Totovytskyi (on loan from Shakhtar Donetsk)	(Ukraine)	MF	20 January 1993 (aged 25)
28	Andriy Korobenko ^{List B} (on loan from Shakhtar Donetsk)	(Ukraine)	MF	28 May 1997 (aged 21)
29	Yevheniy Bilokin ^{List B}	(Ukraine)	MF	16 June 1998 (aged 19)
32	Oleksandr Pikhalyonok (on loan from Shakhtar Donetsk)	(Ukraine)	MF	7 May 1997 (aged 21)
50	Serhiy Bolbat (on loan from Shakhtar Donetsk)	(Ukraine)	MF	13 June 1993 (aged 24)
69	Denys Dedechko	(Ukraine)	MF	2 July 1987 (aged 30)
94	Serhiy Horbunov (on loan from Shakhtar Donetsk)	(Ukraine)	MF	14 March 1994 (aged 24)
97	Artur Avahimyan ^{List B}	(Ukraine)	MF	16 January 1997 (aged 21)
Forwards
39	Andriy Boryachuk (on loan from Shakhtar Donetsk)	(Ukraine)	FW	23 April 1996 (aged 22)
70	Denys Arendaruk (on loan from Shakhtar Donetsk)	(Ukraine)	FW	16 April 1996 (aged 22)
77	Vladyslav Buhay ^{List B} (on loan from Shakhtar Donetsk)	(Ukraine)	FW	27 October 1997 (aged 20)
93	Anatoliy Didenko	(Ukraine)	FW	9 June 1982 (aged 35)

== Transfers ==
=== In ===
Date	Pos.	Player	Age	Moving from	Type	Fee	Source
Summer
19 June 2017	MF	(Ukraine) Vitaliy Koltsov	23	(Ukraine) Shakhtar Donetsk	Transfer	Undisclosed	
20 June 2017	MF	(Ukraine) Artur Avahimyan	20	(Ukraine) Shakhtar Donetsk	Transfer	Free	
28 June 2017	DF	(Ukraine) Ihor Kyryukhantsev	21	(Ukraine) Shakhtar Donetsk	Transfer / Loan ?	Undisclosed	
7 July 2017	MF	(Ukraine) Artem Merkushov	21	(Ukraine) PFC Sumy	Transfer	Undisclosed	
14 July 2017	MF	(Ukraine) Vitaliy Vitsenets	26	Unattached	Transfer	Free	
16 July 2017	DF	(Ukraine) Maksym Bilyi	27	(Russia) Anzhi Makhachkala	Transfer	Free	
11 August 2017	DF	(Brazil) Eriks Santos	21	(Brazil) Internacional	Transfer	Undisclosed	
20 August 2017	GK	(Ukraine) Ihor Levchenko	26	(Ukraine) Zorya Luhansk	Transfer	Free	
1 July 2017	MF	(Ukraine) Oleksandr Luchyk	23	(Ukraine) FC Poltava	Loan return		
1 July 2017	MF	(Ukraine) Serhiy Prykhodko	23	(Ukraine) FC Poltava	Loan return		
1 July 2017	MF	(Ukraine) Ivan Yanakov	22	(Ukraine) FC Poltava	Loan return		
13 June 2017	MF	(Ukraine) Vyacheslav Churko	24	(Ukraine) Shakhtar Donetsk	Loan		
20 June 2017	FW	(Ukraine) Andriy Boryachuk	21	(Ukraine) Shakhtar Donetsk	Loan		
30 June 2017	GK	(Ukraine) Yevhen Hrytsenko	22	(Ukraine) Shakhtar Donetsk	Loan		
7 July 2017	MF	(Ukraine) Serhiy Bolbat	24	(Ukraine) Shakhtar Donetsk	Loan		
16 August 2017	MF	(Ukraine) Vyacheslav Tankovskyi	22	(Ukraine) Shakhtar Donetsk	Loan		
1 September 2017	FW	(Ukraine) Vladyslav Buhay	19	(Ukraine) Shakhtar Donetsk	Loan		
2 September 2017	MF	(Ukraine) Andriy Totovytskyi	24	(Ukraine) Shakhtar Donetsk	Loan		
Winter
1 January 2018	MF	(Ukraine) Denys Dedechko	30	(Russia) SKA-Khabarovsk	Transfer	Undisclosed	
13 February 2018	DF	(North Macedonia) Besir Demiri	23	(North Macedonia) Vardar	Transfer	Free	
17 February 2018	FW	(Ukraine) Anatoliy Didenko	35	(Ukraine) Zhemchuzhyna Odesa	Transfer	Free	
26 February 2018	DF	(Cameroon) Joyskim Dawa	21	Unattached	Transfer	Free	
13 February 2018	MF	(Ukraine) Oleksandr Pikhalyonok	20	(Ukraine) Shakhtar Donetsk	Loan		
23 February 2018	MF	(Ukraine) Danylo Ihnatenko	20	(Ukraine) Shakhtar Donetsk	Loan		
23 February 2018	FW	(Ukraine) Denys Arendaruk	21	(Ukraine) Shakhtar Donetsk	Loan		

=== Out ===
Date	Pos.	Player	Age	Moving to	Type	Fee	Source
Summer
27 June 2017	MF	(Ukraine) Mykola Buy	21	(Ukraine) Rukh Vynnyky	Transfer	Free	
30 June 2017	MF	(Ukraine) Dmytro Ivanisenya	23	Unattached	Transfer	Free	
30 June 2017	MF	(Ukraine) Serhiy Prykhodko	23	Unattached	Transfer	Free	
8 July 2017	MF	(Ukraine) Ivan Yanakov	22	(Ukraine) Kremin Kremenchuk	Transfer	Undisclosed	
12 July 2017	MF	(Ukraine) Oleksandr Luchyk	23	(Ukraine) MFC Mykolaiv	Transfer	Undisclosed	
28 July 2017	GK	(Ukraine) Yaroslav Vazhynskyi	23	(Ukraine) MFC Mykolaiv	Transfer	Free	
28 July 2017	DF	(Ukraine) Artur Novotryasov	25	(Ukraine) Chornomorets Odesa	Transfer	Free	
4 August 2017	DF	(Ukraine) Ivan Tsyupa	24	(Ukraine) Zirka Kropyvnytskyi	Transfer	Free	
9 August 2017	MF	(Ukraine) Kostyantyn Yaroshenko	30	(Finland) Kokkolan Palloveikot	Transfer	Free	
1 June 2017	DF	(Ukraine) Ihor Duts	23	(Ukraine) Shakhtar Donetsk	Loan return		
1 June 2017	DF	(Ukraine) Maksym Zhychykov	24	(Ukraine) Shakhtar Donetsk	Loan return		
1 June 2017	MF	(Ukraine) Oleksandr Kozak	22	(Ukraine) Stal Kamianske	Loan return		
1 June 2017	MF	(Ukraine) Oleksandr Mihunov	23	(Ukraine) Shakhtar Donetsk	Loan return		
1 June 2017	MF	(Ukraine) Vitaliy Koltsov	23	(Ukraine) Shakhtar Donetsk	Loan return		
1 June 2017	MF	(Ukraine) Artur Avahimyan	20	(Ukraine) Shakhtar Donetsk	Loan return		
Winter
1 January 2018	MF	(Ukraine) Vitaliy Vitsenets	27	Retired	Transfer	Free	
11 January 2018	MF	(Ukraine) Denys Kozhanov	30	(Ukraine) Veres Rivne	Transfer	Free	
11 January 2018	MF	(Ukraine) Ruslan Kisil	26	(Ukraine) Olimpik Donetsk	Transfer	Undisclosed	
12 January 2018	DF	(Brazil) Eriks Santos	21	Unattached	Transfer	Free	
31 January 2018	FW	(Ukraine) Ruslan Fomin	31	(Ukraine) Shakhtar Donetsk	Transfer	Undisclosed	
14 February 2018	MF	(Ukraine) Artem Merkushov	21	(Ukraine) Polissya Zhytomyr	Transfer	Undisclosed	
16 March 2018	MF	(Ukraine) Vitaliy Koltsov	23	(Ukraine) FC Oleksandriya	Transfer	Free	
1 January 2018	MF	(Ukraine) Serhiy Rudyka	29	(Belarus) Dnepr Mogilev	Transfer	Free	
1 January 2018	MF	(Ukraine) Serhiy Vakulenko	24	(Ukraine) Shakhtar Donetsk	Loan return		
31 January 2018	MF	(Ukraine) Vyacheslav Tankovskyi	22	(Ukraine) Shakhtar Donetsk	Loan return		

== Pre-season and friendlies ==
29 June 2017 Friendly	Kolos Kovalivka (Ukraine)	0–0	(Ukraine) FC Mariupol	Kovalivka
17:00 EEST (UTC+03:00)		Report		Stadium: Kolos Stadium

2 July 2017 Friendly	Olimpik Donetsk (Ukraine)	1–3	(Ukraine) FC Mariupol	Poltava
17:00 EEST (UTC+03:00)	Bilenkyi 37' (pen.)	Report	Fomin 13' (pen.); Illoy-Ayyet 54' (o.g.); Yavorskyi 68'	Stadium: Ltava Stadium; Attendance: 20; Referee: Andriy Kovalenko

5 July 2017 Friendly	Arsenal Kyiv (Ukraine)	1–2	(Ukraine) FC Mariupol	Bucha
17:00 EEST (UTC+03:00)	Maidanevych 36'	Report	Churko 63'; Kisil 86' (pen.)

6 July 2017 Friendly	Desna Chernihiv (Ukraine)	1–0	(Ukraine) FC Mariupol	Bucha
17:00 EEST (UTC+03:00)	Kartushov 70'	Report

9 July 2016 Friendly	Chornomorets Odesa (Ukraine)	1–3	(Ukraine) FC Mariupol	Odesa
17:00 EEST (UTC+03:00)	Kovalets 35'	Report	Kisil 52'; Mishchenko 77'; Horbunov 83'	Stadium: Chornomorets Train Base; Attendance: Hennadiy Serputko; Referee: 250

2 September 2017 Friendly	Zorya Luhansk (Ukraine)	2–3	(Ukraine) FC Mariupol	Zaporizhia
16:00 EEST (UTC+03:00)	Mayboroda 73'; Kharatin 89'	Report	Myshnyov 11'; Vakulenko 59'; Kisil 84'	Stadium: Torpedo Stadium

7 September 2017 Friendly	Shakhtar Donetsk (Ukraine)	3–2	(Ukraine) FC Mariupol	Shchaslyve
11:00 EEST (UTC+03:00)	Blanco Leschuk 7'; Ferreyra 13'; Taison 86'	Report	Bolbat 54' (pen.); Kisil 84'	Stadium: Knyazha Arena

18 January 2018 Friendly	FC Mariupol (Ukraine)	3–1	(Kazakhstan) Akzhayik	Side, Turkey
15:00 EET (UTC+02:00)	Fomin 3'; Totovytskyi 33' (pen.); 70'	Report	Eseola 9'	Stadium: Hane Sun

22 January 2018 Friendly	FC Mariupol (Ukraine)	1–2	(Kazakhstan) Shakhter Karagandy	Antalya, Turkey
16:30 EET (UTC+02:00)	Bolbat 12'	Report	Putintsev 17'; Tattybaev 26'	Stadium: Topcapi Football Center

25 January 2018 Friendly	FC Mariupol (Ukraine)	3–2	(Azerbaijan) Qarabağ	Belek, Turkey
16:30 EET (UTC+02:00)	Totovytskyi 61' (pen.); Koltsov 73'; Boryachuk 90'	Report	Míchel 58', 71'	Stadium: Calista

26 January 2018 Friendly	FC Mariupol (Ukraine)	1–1	(Poland) Sandecja Nowy Sącz	Side, Turkey
15:00 EET (UTC+02:00)	Boryachuk 78' (pen.)	Report	Piszczek 22'	Stadium: Hane Sun

31 January 2018 Friendly	FC Mariupol (Ukraine)	1–1	(Poland) Jagiellonia Białystok	Belek, Turkey
10:00 EET (UTC+02:00)	Bolbat 14'	Report	Kwiecień 70'	Stadium: Sueno

31 January 2018 Friendly	FC Mariupol (Ukraine)	1–1	(North Macedonia) Rabotnički	Antalya, Turkey
16:30 EET (UTC+02:00)	Tyschenko 80'	Report	Stankovski 26'	Stadium: Miracle

31 January 2018 Friendly	Sileks Kratovo (North Macedonia)	Cancelled	(Ukraine) FC Mariupol	Turkey
EET (UTC+02:00)		Report

4 February 2018 Friendly	FC Mariupol (Ukraine)	0–0	(Serbia) Radnički Niš	Side, Turkey
11:00 EET (UTC+02:00)		Report		Stadium: Sueno

4 February 2018 Friendly	FC Mariupol (Ukraine)	2–1	(Bosnia and Herzegovina) FK Sarajevo	Antalya, Turkey
16:00 EET (UTC+02:00)	Totovytskyi 54'; Yavorskyi 71'	Report	Velkoski 47'	Stadium: Titanic

8 February 2018 Friendly	FC Mariupol (Ukraine)	2–2	(Georgia (country)) Saburtalo Tbilisi	Side, Turkey
10:00 EET (UTC+02:00)	Tyschenko 49'; Korobenko 57'	Report	Kharaishvili 37' (pen.); Gorgiashvili 54'	Stadium: Sueno

8 February 2018 Friendly	FC Mariupol (Ukraine)	3–1	(Lithuania) Stumbras Kaunas	Side, Turkey
16:00 EET (UTC+02:00)	Totovytskyi 34' (pen.); Boryachuk 53'; Yavorskyi 82'	Report	Al-Jassasi 89'	Stadium: Sueno

== Competitions ==
=== Overall ===
Competition	First match	Last match	Starting round	Final position	Record							
Competition	First match	Last match	Starting round	Final position	Pld	W	D	L	GF	GA	GD	Win %
Premier League	16 July 2017	20 May 2018	Matchday 1	5th	32	10	9	13	38	41	−3	31.25
Cup	20 September 2017	18 April 2018	Round 3 (1/16)	Semifinal	4	3	0	1	10	7	+3	75.00
Total					36	13	9	14	48	48	+0	36.11

Last updated: 20 May 2018
Source: Competitions

=== Premier League ===
==== League table ====
Pos	Team	Pld	W	D	L	GF	GA	GD	Pts	Qualification or relegation
2	Dynamo Kyiv	32	22	7	3	64	25	+39	73	Qualification for the Champions League third qualifying round
3	Vorskla Poltava	32	14	7	11	37	35	+2	49	Qualification for the Europa League group stage (Note: Since the winners of the 2017–18 Ukrainian Cup, Shakhtar Donetsk, qualified for European competition based on league position, the spot awarded to the cup winners (Europa League group stage) was passed to the third-placed team, the spot awarded to the third-placed team (Europa League third qualifying round) was passed to the fourth-placed team, and the spot awarded to the fourth-placed team (Europa League second qualifying round) was passed to the fifth-placed team.)
4	Zorya Luhansk	32	11	10	11	44	44	0	43	Qualification for the Europa League third qualifying round
5	FC Mariupol	32	10	9	13	38	41	−3	39	Qualification for the Europa League second qualifying round
6	Veres Rivne (D)	32	7	14	11	28	30	−2	35	Club suspended after the season

Source: Ukrainian Premier League (in Ukrainian), UEFA, Soccerway
Rules for classification: 1) Points; 2) Goal difference; 3) Goals scored; 4) Head-to-head points; 5) Head-to-head goal difference; 6) Head-to-head goals scored; 7) Draw.
(D) Disqualified
Notes:

Team 1	Agg.	Team 2	1st leg	2nd leg
Zirka Kropyvnytskyi	1–5	Desna Chernihiv	1–1	0–4
Chornomorets Odesa	1–3	FC Poltava	1–0	0–3 (a.e.t.)

==== Results summary ====
Overall								Home						Away					
Pld	W	D	L	GF	GA	GD	Pts	W	D	L	GF	GA	GD	W	D	L	GF	GA	GD
32	10	9	13	38	41	−3	39	7	4	5	24	17	+7	3	5	8	14	24	−10

Last updated: 20 May 2018.
Source: Competitive matches

==== Results by round ====
Round	1	2	3	4	5	6	7	8	9	10	11	12	13	14	15	16	17	18	19	20	21	22	23	24	25	26	27	28	29	30	31	32
Ground	H	A	H	A	H	A	H	A	H	H	A	A	H	A	H	A	H	A	H	A	A	H	H	A	H	A	H	A	H	A	H	A
Result	D	D	W	L	W	L	W	W	W	D	L	D	L	D	L	W	L	L	W	W	L	W	D	L	L	L	W	L	L	D	D	D
Position	8	7	5	7	5	6	4	6	3	3	4	5	6	6	6	4	7	7	7	6	6	6	5	5	6	6	5	5	5	5	5	5

Updated to match(es) played on 20 May 2018. Source: Competitive matches
A = Away; H = Home; W = Win; D = Draw; L = Loss

==== Matches ====
16 July 2017 1	FC Mariupol	0–0	Veres Rivne	Mariupol
17:00 EEST (UTC+03:00)	Kisil (yellow card) 38'; Myshnyov (yellow card) 73'; Rudyka (yellow card) 82'; Yavorskyi (yellow card) 90+1'; Vakulenko (yellow card) 90+1'	Report	Bandura (yellow card) 87'; Hryn (yellow card) 90+3'	Stadium: Volodymyr Boiko Stadium; Attendance: 8,500; Referee: Vitaliy Romanov

23 July 2017 2	Zorya Luhansk	1–1	FC Mariupol	Zaporizhia
19:30 EEST (UTC+03:00)	Sukhotskyi (yellow card) 39'; Opanasenko 70'	Report	Yavorskyi 16'	Stadium: Slavutych-Arena; Attendance: 1,700; Referee: Oleksandr Derdo

30 July 2017 3	FC Mariupol	3–0	Chornomorets Odesa	Mariupol
17:00 EEST (UTC+03:00)	Vakulenko 33' (pen.), 55'; Fomin 53', (yellow card) 59'	Report	Rakhmanaw (yellow card) 52'	Stadium: Volodymyr Boiko Stadium; Attendance: 8,750; Referee: Dmytro Kutakov

5 August 2017 4	Shakhtar Donetsk	3–1	FC Mariupol	Kharkiv
19:30 EEST (UTC+03:00)	Bernard 7', (yellow card) 32'; Marlos 42'; Rakitskiy (yellow card) 61'; Kryvtsov 67'; Stepanenko (yellow card) 77'; Petryak (yellow card) 86'	Report	Tyschenko (yellow card) 62', (goal) 72'; Bilyi (yellow card) 74'	Stadium: Metalist OSC; Attendance: 9,141; Referee: Mykola Balakin

13 August 2017 5	FC Mariupol	3–0	Karpaty Lviv	Mariupol
17:00 EEST (UTC+03:00)	Koltsov (yellow card) 6'; Churko 10', 18'; Fomin (yellow card) 21'; Myshnyov (yellow card) 90'; Bolbat 90+2'	Report	Ribas (yellow card) 67'; Fedetskyi (yellow card) 84'	Stadium: Volodymyr Boiko Stadium; Attendance: 9,120; Referee: Serhiy Boyko

20 August 2017 6	Vorskla Poltava	1–0	FC Mariupol	Poltava
19:30 EEST (UTC+03:00)	Sklyar (yellow card) 66'; Chyzhov (yellow card) 72', (goal) 82'	Report	Nasonov (yellow card) 56'; Koltsov (yellow card) 71'; Rudyka (yellow card) 79'	Stadium: Vorskla Stadium; Attendance: 4,500; Referee: Serhiy Berezka

27 August 2017 7	FC Mariupol	3–0^{(1)}	Dynamo Kyiv	Mariupol
17:00 EEST (UTC+03:00)		Report		Stadium: Volodymyr Boiko Stadium; Attendance: 0 Referee: Yuriy Mozharovsky

10 September 2017 8	Stal Kamianske	0–1	FC Mariupol	Kyiv
17:00 EEST (UTC+03:00)	Mykhaylychenko (yellow card) 40'; Mysyk (yellow card) 90+2'	Report	Vakulenko 41' (pen.); Khudzhamov (yellow card) 79'; Rudyka (yellow card) 82'; Fomin (yellow card) 85'; Nasonov (yellow card) 85'	Stadium: Obolon Arena; Attendance: 503; Referee: Anatoliy Abdula

16 September 2017 9	FC Mariupol	1–0	Zirka Kropyvnytskyi	Mariupol
17:00 EEST (UTC+03:00)	Fomin 17'; Nasonov (yellow card) 43'; Rudyka (yellow card) 58'	Report	Drachenko (yellow card) 18'; Cécé Pepe (yellow card) 40'; El Hamdaoui (yellow card) 90+2'	Stadium: Volodymyr Boiko Stadium; Attendance: 3,375; Referee: Mykola Kryvonosov

24 September 2017 10	FC Mariupol	1–1	FC Oleksandriya	Mariupol
17:00 EEST (UTC+03:00)	Bolbat (yellow card) 56'; Tankovskyi (yellow card) 62'; Kisil (yellow card) 79'; Yavorskyi 86'	Report	Hrytsuk 28'; Polyarus (yellow card) 30'; Zaporozhan (yellow card) 34'; Levanidov (yellow card) 61'	Stadium: Volodymyr Boiko Stadium; Attendance: 8,810; Referee: Yuriy Hrysyo

30 September 2017 11	Olimpik Donetsk	3–2	FC Mariupol	Kyiv
14:00 EEST (UTC+03:00)	Kravchenko (yellow card) 45', (goal) 57'; Fedoriv (yellow card) 45+2'; Ochigava (yellow card) 53' (yellow-red card) 68'; Bilenkyi 78'; Bohdanov 84' (pen.)	Report	Vakulenko (yellow card) 19' (yellow-red card) 49'; Yavorskyi (yellow card) 33'; Boryachuk 73'; Koltsov 75' (pen.), (yellow card) 90+2'; Fomin (yellow card) 90'	Stadium: Dynamo Stadium; Attendance: 350; Referee: Anatoliy Abdula

14 October 2017 12	Veres Rivne	1–1	FC Mariupol	Lviv
17:00 EEST (UTC+03:00)	Voloshynovych (yellow card) 19'; Borzenko 65'; Siminin (yellow card) 76'	Report	Tankovskyi (yellow card) 24'; Yavorskyi (red card) 68'; Tyschenko (yellow card) 73'; Totovytskyi 80'	Stadium: Arena Lviv; Attendance: 1,060; Referee: Serhiy Boyko

22 October 2017 13	FC Mariupol	2–5	Zorya Luhansk	Mariupol
17:00 EEST (UTC+03:00)	Bilyi 6'; Kozhanov 31'; Vakulenko (yellow card) 38' (yellow-red card) 49'; Tankovskyi (yellow card) 90+2'	Report	Andriyevskyi 29', 38', 63'; Hrechyshkin 34' (pen.); Ljubenović (yellow card) 41'; Sukhotskyi (yellow card) 54'; Silas (yellow card) 56'; Opanasenko 90+1'	Stadium: Volodymyr Boiko Stadium; Attendance: 6,881; Referee: Kostyantyn Trukhanov

30 October 2017 14	Chornomorets Odesa	0–0	FC Mariupol	Odesa
19:00 EET (UTC+02:00)	Lyulka (yellow card) 37'; Žunić (yellow card) 60'	Report	Fomin (yellow card) 22'; Kozhanov (yellow card) 52'; Tyschenko (yellow card) 55'	Stadium: Chornomorets Stadium; Attendance: 2,756; Referee: Kateryna Monzul

5 November 2017 15	FC Mariupol	1–3	Shakhtar Donetsk	Mariupol
14:00 EET (UTC+02:00)	Gomis (yellow card) 14' (yellow-red card) 45'; Kozhanov (yellow card) 45'; Fomin (yellow card) 47', (goal) 49'	Report	Ferreyra 30'; Marlos 45+1', (yellow card) 88'; Bernard 56'	Stadium: Volodymyr Boiko Stadium; Attendance: 11,670; Referee: Viktor Kopiyevskyi

18 November 2017 16	Karpaty Lviv	0–1	FC Mariupol	Lviv
17:00 EET (UTC+02:00)	Carrascal (yellow card) 40'; Fedetskyi (yellow card) 58'; Holodyuk (yellow card) 71'; Tissone (yellow card) 81'; Stasyshyn (yellow card) 82'	Report	Bolbat 19'	Stadium: Ukraina Stadium; Attendance: 0 Referee: Anatoliy Abdula

25 November 2017 17	FC Mariupol	0–1	Vorskla Poltava	Mariupol
14:00 EET (UTC+02:00)	Fomin (yellow card) 20'; Tankovskyi (yellow card) 41'; Totovytskyi (yellow card) 66'	Report	Sklyar (yellow card) 17' (yellow-red card) 55'; Perduta (yellow card) 34'; Sharpar 79', (yellow card) 79'	Stadium: Volodymyr Boiko Stadium; Attendance: 4,129; Referee: Dmytro Kutakov

3 December 2017 18	Dynamo Kyiv	5–1	FC Mariupol	Kyiv
19:30 EET (UTC+02:00)	Harmash 28'; Tsyhankov 45+3'; Moraes 75', 84'; González 90'	Report	Yavorskyi (yellow card) 14' (yellow-red card) 68'; Bolbat 27'	Stadium: NSC Olimpiyskiy; Attendance: 6,147; Referee: Kostyantyn Trukhanov

9 December 2017 19	FC Mariupol	4–2	Stal Kamianske	Mariupol
14:00 EET (UTC+03:00)	Tankovskyi (yellow card) 23'; Fomin 34', 67', (yellow card) 88'; Gomis (yellow card) 52'; Totovytskyi 78'; Bolbat 82'; Tyschenko (yellow card) 86'	Report	Edgar Malakyan 26', 87'; Meskhi (yellow card) 39'	Stadium: Volodymyr Boiko Stadium; Attendance: 3,140; Referee: Oleksandr Derdo

18 February 2018 20	Zirka Kropyvnytskyi	0–3	FC Mariupol	Kropyvnytskyi
14:00 EET (UTC+02:00)		Report	Boryachuk 9', 26', 57'; Dedechko (yellow card) 32'; Bolbat (yellow card) 57'	Stadium: Zirka Stadium; Attendance: 1,432; Referee: Yaroslav Kozyk

24 February 2018 21	FC Oleksandriya	1–0	FC Mariupol	Oleksandriya
14:00 EET (UTC+02:00)	Bukhal (yellow card) 14', (goal) 88'; Tsurikov (yellow card) 41'	Report	Dedechko (yellow card) 45'; Churko (yellow card) 50'; Totovytskyi (yellow card) 90+2'	Stadium: CSC Nika Stadium; Attendance: 613; Referee: Ihor Paskhal

4 March 2018 22	FC Mariupol	1–0	Olimpik Donetsk	Mariupol
14:00 EET (UTC+02:00)	Bolbat 29'; Dawa (yellow card) 40'; Demiri (yellow card) 65'	Report	Vakulenko (yellow card) 15'; Doronin (yellow card) 45+1'; Hennadiy Pasich (yellow card) 57'; Ochigava (yellow card) 76'	Stadium: Volodymyr Boiko Stadium; Attendance: 2,250; Referee: Vitaliy Romanov

11 March 2018 23	FC Mariupol	0–0	Zorya Luhansk	Mariupol
17:00 EET (UTC+02:00)	Totovytskyi (yellow card) 6'; Myshnyov (yellow card) 13'; Dedechko (yellow card) 36'; Bolbat (yellow card) 56'; Demiri (yellow card) 73'	Report	Andriyevskyi (yellow card) 62'; Svatok (yellow card) 80'; Iury (yellow card) 87'	Stadium: Volodymyr Boiko Stadium; Attendance: 2,613; Referee: Ievgenii Aranovskyi

17 March 2018 24	Shakhtar Donetsk	3–0	FC Mariupol	Kharkiv
17:00 EET (UTC+02:00)	Ismaily 26'; Marlos 45+3'; Fred 67'; Rakitskiy (yellow card) 68'	Report	Tyschenko (yellow card) 88'	Stadium: Metalist OSC; Attendance: 1,631; Referee: Yaroslav Kozyk

1 April 2018 25	FC Mariupol	2–3	Dynamo Kyiv	Mariupol
17:00 EEST (UTC+03:00)	Totovytskyi 28', 78'; Dedechko (yellow card) 66'	Report	Besyedin 48'; Harmash (yellow card) 58'; Burda (yellow card) 62'; Shaparenko 65'; Tsyhankov 72'; Boyko (yellow card) 90+3'	Stadium: Volodymyr Boiko Stadium; Attendance: 10,742; Referee: Yuriy Mozharovsky

7 April 2018 26	Vorskla Poltava	1–0	FC Mariupol	Poltava
19:30 EEST (UTC+03:00)	Chesnakov (yellow card) 19'; Sharpar (yellow card) 28'; Serhiychuk 57', (yellow card) 59'; Shust (yellow card) 65'	Report	Ihnatenko (yellow card) 90+1'; Didenko (yellow card) 90+2'	Stadium: Vorskla Stadium; Attendance: 10,030; Referee: Mykola Balakin

14 April 2018 27	FC Mariupol	2–0	Veres Rivne	Mariupol
14:00 EEST (UTC+03:00)	Churko 6'; Yavorskyi (yellow card) 45'; Dawa (yellow card) 49'; Totovytskyi 61'; Ihnatenko (yellow card) 85'; Demiri (yellow card) 86'	Report	Zapadnya (yellow card) 72'	Stadium: Volodymyr Boiko Stadium; Attendance: 3,274; Referee: Dmytro Bondarenko

22 April 2018 28	Zorya Luhansk	3–1	FC Mariupol	Zaporizhia
14:00 EEST (UTC+03:00)	Iury 67', (yellow card) 69'; Hordiyenko 75'; Hromov 90+2'	Report	Dawa (yellow card) 18'; Ihnatenko (yellow card) 23'; Myshnyov 30'; Yavorskyi (yellow card) 69'; Totovytskyi (yellow card) 80'; Kyryukhantsev (red card) 80'; Bilyi (yellow card) 82'; Dedechko (yellow card) 87'	Stadium: Slavutych-Arena; Attendance: 2,075; Referee: Yuriy Mozharovskyi

27 April 2018 29	FC Mariupol	0–1	Shakhtar Donetsk	Mariupol
17:00 EEST (UTC+03:00)	Neplyakh (yellow card) 33'	Report	Kayode 65'; Taison (yellow card) 69'; Khocholava (yellow card) 78'	Stadium: Volodymyr Boiko Stadium; Attendance: 8,314; Referee: Viktor Kopiyevskyi

4 May 2018 30	Dynamo Kyiv	1–1	FC Mariupol	Kyiv
19:00 EEST (UTC+03:00)	Besyedin (yellow card) 20'; Tsyhankov 55' (pen.)	Report	Boryachuk 16', (yellow card) 52'; Myshnyov (yellow card) 49'; Bykov (yellow card) 56'; Bolbat (yellow card) 90+2'	Stadium: Dynamo Stadium; Attendance: 7,869; Referee: Anatoliy Abdula

13 May 2018 31	FC Mariupol	1–1	Vorskla Poltava	Mariupol
19:30 EEST (UTC+03:00)	Boryachuk (yellow card) 20'; Tyschenko 52'	Report	Kolomoyets 30', (yellow card) 60'; Chyzhov (yellow card) 39'; Serhiychuk (yellow card) 80'; Kravchenko (yellow card) 83'	Stadium: Volodymyr Boiko Stadium; Attendance: 2,672; Referee: Dmytro Bondarenko

20 May 2018 32	Veres Rivne	1–1	FC Mariupol	Lviv
17:00 EET (UTC+02:00)	Stepanyuk (yellow card) 57'; Kozhanov 61'; Siminin (yellow card) 69' (yellow-red card) 86'; Kalenchuk (yellow card) 81'	Report	Totovytskyi (yellow card) 43'; Ihnatenko (yellow card) 57'; Boryachuk (yellow card) 71'; Didenko 79'	Stadium: Ukraina Stadium; Attendance: 1,100; Referee: Yuriy Mozharovskyi

- ^(1) FC Mariupol was assigned 3–0 victory by FFU, after Dynamo Kyiv refused to play the match in Mariupol

=== Ukrainian Cup ===
20 September 2017 Round 3 (1/16)	Kolos Kovalivka	1–2	FC Mariupol	Kovalivka
16:00 EEST (UTC+03:00)	Zadoya (yellow card) 28'; Lysenko 50'; Matvyeyev (yellow card) 57'; Semenko (yellow card) 80'; Leonov (yellow card) 90'	[ Report]	Kozhanov 45'; Kisil 53'; Yavorskyi (yellow card) 71' (yellow-red card) 72'	Stadium: Kolos Stadium; Attendance: 800; Referee: Dmytro Panchyshyn

25 October 2017 Round of 16 (1/8)	Tavriya Simferopol	0–5	FC Mariupol	Beryslav
14:00 EEST (UTC+03:00)	Hryppa (yellow card) 28'	Report	Boryachuk 35', 90'; Tankovskyi 54'; Kisil (yellow card) 61'; Korobenko 73', 84'	Stadium: Mashynobudivnyk Stadium; Attendance: 1,200; Referee: Maksym Kozyryanskyi

29 November 2017 Quarterfinal	Vorskla Poltava	1–2	FC Mariupol	Poltava
17:00 EET (UTC+02:00)	Kulach 13'	Report	Boryachuk 24'; Totovytskyi (yellow card) 49', (goal) 77'; Churko (yellow card) 54'	Stadium: Vorskla Stadium; Attendance: 600; Referee: Anatoliy Abdula

18 April 2018 Semifinal	Shakhtar Donetsk	5–1	FC Mariupol	Kharkiv
19:00 EET (UTC+02:00)	Taison 7', 45'; Marlos 38'; Matviyenko (yellow card) 47'; Kayode 74'; Petryak 81'	Report	Neplyakh (yellow card) 14'; Tyschenko 22'; Bykov (yellow card) 64'	Stadium: Metalist OSC; Referee: Ievgenii Aranovskyi

== Statistics ==
=== Appearances and goals ===
No.	Pos	Nat	Player	Total		Premier League		Cup	
No.	Pos	Nat	Player	Apps	Goals	Apps	Goals	Apps	Goals
Goalkeepers
1	GK	(Ukraine) UKR	Yevhen Halchuk	10	0	7	0	3	0
12	GK	(Ukraine) UKR	Rustam Khudzhamov	25	0	24	0	1	0
14	GK	(Ukraine) UKR	Ihor Levchenko	1	0	0+1	0	0	0
Defenders
2	DF	(Ukraine) UKR	Oleksiy Bykov	6	0	4+1	0	1	0
4	DF	(Ukraine) UKR	Yevhen Neplyakh	20	0	15+2	0	2+1	0
5	DF	(Cameroon) CMR	Joyskim Dawa	11	0	9+1	0	0+1	0
13	DF	(Ukraine) UKR	Serhiy Yavorskyi	28	2	26	2	2	0
20	DF	(Ukraine) UKR	Ihor Kyryukhantsev	20	0	18	0	0+2	0
23	DF	(Ukraine) UKR	Oleksandr Nasonov	17	0	10+3	0	2+2	0
27	DF	(North Macedonia) MKD	Besir Demiri	13	0	12	0	1	0
30	DF	(Ukraine) UKR	Maksym Bilyi	25	1	15+6	1	4	0
	DF	(Ukraine) UKR	Vladyslav Savin	1	0	0	0	1	0
Midfielders
7	MF	(Ukraine) UKR	Danylo Ihnatenko	7	0	4+3	0	0	0
8	MF	(Ukraine) UKR	Artur Murza	1	0	0+1	0	0	0
9	MF	(Ukraine) UKR	Dmytro Myshnyov	32	1	28+1	1	3	0
11	MF	(Ukraine) UKR	Vyacheslav Churko	23	3	16+6	3	1	0
17	MF	(Senegal) SEN	Roger Gomis	4	0	2+2	0	0	0
19	MF	(Ukraine) UKR	Ihor Tyschenko	25	3	14+7	2	4	1
22	MF	(Ukraine) UKR	Andriy Totovytskyi	25	6	17+5	5	3	1
28	MF	(Ukraine) UKR	Andriy Korobenko	2	2	0+1	0	0+1	2
29	MF	(Ukraine) UKR	Yevheniy Bilokin	2	0	0+2	0	0	0
32	MF	(Ukraine) UKR	Oleksandr Pikhalyonok	10	0	6+4	0	0	0
50	MF	(Ukraine) UKR	Serhiy Bolbat	27	5	22+4	5	1	0
69	MF	(Ukraine) UKR	Denys Dedechko	12	0	10+1	0	1	0
97	MF	(Ukraine) UKR	Artur Avahimyan	4	0	0+3	0	0+1	0
Forwards
39	FW	(Ukraine) UKR	Andriy Boryachuk	20	8	7+11	5	2	3
70	FW	(Ukraine) UKR	Denys Arendaruk	1	0	0+1	0	0	0
93	FW	(Ukraine) UKR	Anatoliy Didenko	9	1	2+6	1	1	0
Players transferred out during the season
6	MF	(Ukraine) UKR	Vitaliy Vitsenets	9	0	1+7	0	1	0
7	MF	(Ukraine) UKR	Ruslan Kisil	10	1	5+3	0	2	1
8	MF	(Ukraine) UKR	Vitaliy Koltsov	11	1	8+2	1	1	0
24	MF	(Ukraine) UKR	Vyacheslav Tankovskyi	12	1	9	0	2+1	1
29	MF	(Ukraine) UKR	Denys Kozhanov	19	2	15+3	1	1	1
31	DF	(Brazil) BRA	Eriks Santos	2	0	0+1	0	1	0
79	MF	(Ukraine) UKR	Serhiy Vakulenko	15	3	12+2	3	1	0
86	FW	(Ukraine) UKR	Ruslan Fomin	17	5	16	5	0+1	0
88	MF	(Ukraine) UKR	Serhiy Rudyka	11	0	7+2	0	2	0

Source: Competitions

Last updated: 20 May 2018

=== Goalscorers ===
Rank	No.	Pos	Nat	Name	Premier League	Cup	Total
1	39	FW	(Ukraine)	Andriy Boryachuk	5	3	8
2	22	MF	(Ukraine)	Andriy Totovytskyi	5	1	6
3	50	MF	(Ukraine)	Serhiy Bolbat	5	0	5
3	86	FW	(Ukraine)	Ruslan Fomin	5	0	5
5	11	MF	(Ukraine)	Vyacheslav Churko	3	0	3
5	19	MF	(Ukraine)	Ihor Tyschenko	2	1	3
5	79	MF	(Ukraine)	Serhiy Vakulenko	3	0	3
8	13	DF	(Ukraine)	Serhiy Yavorskyi	2	0	2
8	28	MF	(Ukraine)	Andriy Korobenko	0	2	2
8	29	MF	(Ukraine)	Denys Kozhanov	1	1	2
11	7	MF	(Ukraine)	Ruslan Kisil	0	1	1
11	8	MF	(Ukraine)	Vitaliy Koltsov	1	0	1
11	9	MF	(Ukraine)	Dmytro Myshnyov	1	0	1
11	24	MF	(Ukraine)	Vyacheslav Tankovskyi	0	1	1
11	30	DF	(Ukraine)	Maksym Bilyi	1	0	1
11	93	FW	(Ukraine)	Anatoliy Didenko	1	0	1
				Technical victory	3	0	3
				Total	38	10	48

Last updated: 20 May 2018

=== Clean sheets ===
Rank	No.	Pos	Nat	Name	Premier League	Cup	Total
1	12	GK	(Ukraine)	Rustam Khudzhamov	10	0	10
2	1	GK	(Ukraine)	Yevhen Halchuk	2	1	3
				Total	12	1	13

Last updated: 20 May 2018

=== Disciplinary record ===
No.	Pos	Nat	Player	Premier League			Cup			Total		
No.	Pos	Nat	Player	Booked	(yellow card) (yellow-red card)	Sent off (straight red)	Booked	(yellow card) (yellow-red card)	Sent off (straight red)	Booked	(yellow card) (yellow-red card)	Sent off (straight red)
2	DF	(Ukraine)	Oleksiy Bykov	1	0	0	1	0	0	2	0	0
4	DF	(Ukraine)	Yevhen Neplyakh	1	0	0	1	0	0	2	0	0
5	DF	(Cameroon)	Joyskim Dawa	3	0	0	0	0	0	3	0	0
7	MF	(Ukraine)	Danylo Ihnatenko	4	0	0	0	0	0	4	0	0
7	MF	(Ukraine)	Ruslan Kisil	2	0	0	1	0	0	3	0	0
8	MF	(Ukraine)	Vitaliy Koltsov	3	0	0	0	0	0	3	0	0
9	MF	(Ukraine)	Dmytro Myshnyov	4	0	0	0	0	0	4	0	0
11	MF	(Ukraine)	Vyacheslav Churko	1	0	0	1	0	0	2	0	0
12	GK	(Ukraine)	Rustam Khudzhamov	1	0	0	0	0	0	1	0	0
13	DF	(Ukraine)	Serhiy Yavorskyi	4	1	1	0	1	0	4	2	1
17	MF	(Senegal)	Roger Gomis	1	0	0	0	0	0	1	0	0
19	MF	(Ukraine)	Ihor Tyschenko	5	0	0	0	0	0	5	0	0
20	MF	(Ukraine)	Ihor Kyryukhantsev	0	0	1	0	0	0	0	0	1
22	MF	(Ukraine)	Andriy Totovytskyi	5	0	0	1	0	0	6	0	0
23	DF	(Ukraine)	Oleksandr Nasonov	3	0	0	0	0	0	3	0	0
24	MF	(Ukraine)	Vyacheslav Tankovskyi	5	0	0	0	0	0	5	0	0
27	DF	(North Macedonia)	Besir Demiri	3	0	0	0	0	0	3	0	0
29	MF	(Ukraine)	Denys Kozhanov	1	0	0	0	0	0	1	0	0
30	DF	(Ukraine)	Maksym Bilyi	2	0	0	0	0	0	2	0	0
39	FW	(Ukraine)	Andriy Boryachuk	3	0	0	0	0	0	3	0	0
50	MF	(Ukraine)	Serhiy Bolbat	4	0	0	0	0	0	4	0	0
69	MF	(Ukraine)	Denys Dedechko	5	0	0	0	0	0	5	0	0
79	MF	(Ukraine)	Serhiy Vakulenko	1	2	0	0	0	0	1	2	0
86	FW	(Ukraine)	Ruslan Fomin	7	0	0	0	0	0	7	0	0
88	MF	(Ukraine)	Serhiy Rudyka	4	0	0	0	0	0	4	0	0
93	FW	(Ukraine)	Anatoliy Didenko	1	0	0	0	0	0	1	0	0
			Total	74	3	2	5	1	0	79	4	2

Last updated: 20 May 2018
