= 2017–18 FC Shakhtar Donetsk season =

Shakhtar Donetsk
2017–18 season
- Chairman: Rinat Akhmetov
- Manager: Paulo Fonseca
- Stadium: Donbas Arena
- Premier League: 1st
- Ukrainian Cup: Winners
- Super Cup: Winners
- UEFA Champions League: Round of 16
- Top goalscorer: League: Facundo Ferreyra (21); All: Facundo Ferreyra (30)
- Highest home attendance: 35,124 vs Roma
- Lowest home attendance: 1,350 vs Veres Rivne
- Average home league attendance: 7,466
Home colours	Away colours	Third colours

The 2017–18 Shakhtar Donetsk season was the club's 27th season.

== Season events ==
On 11 April, Shakhtar announced the signing of Davit Khocholava from Chornomorets Odesa, with the Georgian defender joining on 1 July with a five-year contract.

On 9 June, Shakhtar announced the signing of Olarenwaju Kayode on loan from Manchester City for the season.

On 17 June, Shakhtar extended their contract with Oleksandr Zubkov for another five seasons.

On 8 December, Shakhtar announced the signing of Dodô from Coritiba, on a contract until the end of 2022.

On 11 January, Shakhtar signed an agreement with Ilya Vasilevich, with the Belarussian joining the club on 14 April once he turned 18.

On 2 February, Shakhtar announced the signing of Ruslan Fomin from Mariupol.

On 10 April, Shakhtar extended their contract with Andriy Pyatov.

== Squad ==
As of match played 19 May 2018

Number	Name	Nationality	Position	Date of birth (age)	Signed from	Signed in	Contract ends	Apps.	Goals
Goalkeepers
26	Mykyta Shevchenko	(Ukraine)	GK	26 January 1993 (aged 25)	Academy	2011		6	0
30	Andriy Pyatov	(Ukraine)	GK	28 June 1984 (aged 33)	Vorskla Poltava	2007		385	0
55	Oleh Kudryk	(Ukraine)	GK	17 October 1996 (aged 21)	Lviv	2011		1	0
Defenders
2	Bohdan Butko	(Ukraine)	DF	13 January 1991 (aged 27)	Academy	2008		45	1
4	Serhiy Kryvtsov	(Ukraine)	DF	15 March 1991 (aged 27)	Metalurh Zaporizhzhia	2010	2021	111	11
5	Davit Khocholava	(Georgia (country))	DF	8 February 1993 (aged 25)	Chornomorets Odesa	2017	2022	22	1
18	Ivan Ordets	(Ukraine)	DF	8 July 1992 (aged 25)	Academy	2009		99	4
22	Mykola Matviyenko	(Ukraine)	DF	28 February 2000 (aged 18)	Academy	2015		13	0
31	Ismaily	(Brazil)	DF	11 January 1990 (aged 28)	Braga	2013	2017	132	10
33	Darijo Srna (Captain)	(Croatia)	DF	1 May 1982 (aged 36)	Hajduk Split	2003	2018	534	50
44	Yaroslav Rakitskyi	(Ukraine)	DF	3 August 1989 (aged 28)	Academy	2009	2022	309	13
98	Dodô	(Brazil)	DF	17 November 1998 (aged 19)	Coritiba	2018	2022	3	0
Midfielders
6	Taras Stepanenko	(Ukraine)	MF	8 August 1989 (aged 28)	Metalurh Zaporizhzhia	2010	2022	236	15
7	Taison	(Brazil)	MF	17 January 1988 (aged 30)	Metalist Kharkiv	2013	2021	197	36
8	Fred	(Brazil)	MF	5 March 1993 (aged 25)	Internacional	2013	2018	156	15
10	Bernard	(Brazil)	MF	8 September 1992 (aged 25)	Atlético Mineiro	2013	2018	157	28
11	Marlos	(Ukraine)	MF	7 June 1988 (aged 29)	Metalist Kharkiv	2014	2019	168	47
12	Wellington Nem	(Brazil)	MF	6 February 1992 (aged 26)	Fluminense	2013	2018	54	9
17	Maksym Malyshev	(Ukraine)	MF	24 December 1992 (aged 25)	Academy	2009		73	7
20	Vyacheslav Tankovskyi	(Ukraine)	MF	16 August 1995 (aged 22)	Academy	2008		8	0
21	Alan Patrick	(Brazil)	MF	13 May 1991 (aged 27)	Santos	2011	2016	48	6
24	Dmytro Hrechyshkin	(Ukraine)	MF	22 September 1991 (aged 26)	Illichivets Mariupol	2013		18	1
34	Ivan Petryak	(Ukraine)	MF	13 March 1993 (aged 25)	Zorya Luhansk	2016		17	2
59	Oleksandr Zubkov	(Ukraine)	MF	3 August 1996 (aged 21)	Olimpik Donetsk	2011	2022	23	0
74	Viktor Kovalenko	(Ukraine)	MF	14 February 1996 (aged 22)	Academy	2008		125	19
Forwards
9	Dentinho	(Brazil)	FW	19 January 1989 (aged 29)	Corinthians	2011		138	15
19	Facundo Ferreyra	(Argentina)	FW	14 March 1991 (aged 27)	Vélez Sarsfield	2013	2017	104	56
86	Ruslan Fomin	(Ukraine)	FW	2 March 1986 (aged 32)	Mariupol	2018		30	5
88	Olarenwaju Kayode	(Nigeria)	FW	8 May 1993 (aged 25)	on loan from Manchester City	2018	2018	8	3
99	Gustavo Blanco Leschuk	(Argentina)	FW	5 November 1991 (aged 26)	Karpaty Lviv	2017	2020	31	8
Also under contract
59	Mykyta Adamenko	(Ukraine)	MF	14 September 1995 (aged 22)	Academy	2014		0	0
90	Artem Dudik	(Ukraine)	FW	2 January 1997 (aged 21)	Volyn Lutsk	2017		0	0
	Ilya Vasilevich	(Belarus)	FW	14 April 2000 (aged 18)	Baranovichi	2018		0	0
	Artur Zahorulko	(Ukraine)	FW	13 April 1993 (aged 25)	Academy	2011			
Away on loan
29	Andriy Totovytskyi	(Ukraine)	MF	20 January 1993 (aged 25)	Academy	2010		1	0
Players who left during the season
66	Márcio Azevedo	(Brazil)	DF	5 February 1986 (aged 32)	Metalist Kharkiv	2014	2018	28	0
67	Oleksandr Pikhalyonok	(Ukraine)	MF	7 May 1997 (aged 21)	Academy	2014		2	0

=== U21 team squad ===
Note: Flags indicate national team as defined under FIFA eligibility rules; some limited exceptions apply. Players may hold more than one non-FIFA nationality.

No.	Pos.	Nation	Player
15	DF	UKR	Volodymyr Hrachov
16	DF	UKR	Serhiy Chobotenko
41	FW	GEO	Giorgi Arabidze
54	GK	UKR	Yevhen Hrytsenko
58	DF	UKR	Yevhen Chahovets
60	MF	UKR	Illya Putrya
61	MF	UKR	Dmytro Topalov
62	MF	UKR	Vladyslav Yakymets
63	FW	UKR	Oleksandr Hlahola

No.	Pos.	Nation	Player
64	FW	UKR	Roman Yalovenko
65	DF	UKR	Yukhym Konoplya
69	DF	UKR	Danylo Sahutkin
70	GK	UKR	Ruslan Yefanov
75	MF	UKR	Viktor Korniyenko
76	DF	AZE	Murad Khachayev
77	DF	UKR	Valeriy Bondar
91	DF	UKR	Andriy Zaporoshchenko

== Transfers ==
=== In ===
Date	Position	Nationality	Name	From	Fee	Ref.
1 July 2017	DF	(Georgia (country))	Davit Khocholava	Chornomorets Odesa	Undisclosed	
18 August 2017	FW	(Ukraine)	Artem Dudik	Volyn Lutsk	Undisclosed	
8 December 2017	DF	(Brazil)	Dodô	Coritiba	€2,000,000	
2 February 2018	FW	(Ukraine)	Ruslan Fomin	Mariupol	Undisclosed	
15 April 2018	FW	(Belarus)	Ilya Vasilevich	Baranovichi	Undisclosed	

=== Loans in ===
Date From	Position	Nationality	Name	To	Date To	Ref.
2 March 2018	FW	(Nigeria)	Olarenwaju Kayode	Manchester City	30 June 2018	

=== Out ===
Date	Position	Nationality	Name	From	Fee	Ref.

Date	Position	No.	Player	To club	Fee	Ref.
1 June 2017	DF	14	(Ukraine) Vasyl Kobin	(Ukraine) Veres	Free	
19 June 2017	MF		(Ukraine) Vitaliy Koltsov	(Ukraine) Mariupol	Free	
20 June 2017	MF		(Ukraine) Artur Avahimyan	(Ukraine) Mariupol	Free	
29 June 2017	MF		(Ukraine) Serhiy Horbunov	(Ukraine) Mariupol	Free	
1 July 2017	MF		(Ukraine) Ihor Sukhaninskyi	(Ukraine) Metalist 1925	Free	
11 July 2017	DF		(Ukraine) Illya Hlushytskyi	(Ukraine) Helios	Free	
12 July 2017	MF		(Ukraine) Yevhen Prodanov	(Ukraine) Mariupol	Free	
22 July 2017	DF		(Ukraine) Maksym Zhychykov	(Lithuania) Jonava	Free	
24 August 2017	MF	24	(Ukraine) Oleksandr Karavayev	(Ukraine) Zorya	Free	
16 December 2017	DF		(Ukraine) Mykhaylo Pysko	(Ukraine) Rukh	Free	
8 February 2018	GK		(Ukraine) Andriy Bubentsov	(Ukraine) Sumy	Free	
12 February 2018	MF	64	(Ukraine) Yuriy Hluschuk	(Ukraine) Vorskla	Free	
14 February 2018	MF		(Ukraine) Oleksandr Mihunov	(Kazakhstan) Shakhter	Free	
20 February 2018	MF		(Ukraine) Valeriy Hryshyn	(Maldives) Valencia	Free	
Total					€3,000,000	

=== Loans out ===
Date From	Position	Nationality	Name	To	Date To	Ref.
1 January 2017	FW	(Brazil)	Wellington Nem	São Paulo	31 December 2017	
20 June 2017	FW	(Ukraine)	Andriy Boryachuk	Mariupol	30 June 2018	
23 June 2017	MF	(Ukraine)	Oleh Danchenko	Anzhi Makhachkala	30 June 2018	
11 January 2018	DF	(Brazil)	Márcio Azevedo	PAOK	30 June 2018	

Date	Position	No.	Player	To club	Fee	Ref.
13 June 2017	MF	72	(Ukraine) Vyacheslav Churko	(Ukraine) Mariupol	Free	
15 June 2017	FW		(Ukraine) Vladyslav Kulach	(Ukraine) Vorskla	Free	
27 June 2017	DF		(Ukraine) Ihor Duts	(Ukraine) Rukh	Free	
28 June 2017	DF	52	(Ukraine) Ihor Kyryukhantsev	(Ukraine) Mariupol	Free	
7 July 2017	MF	50	(Ukraine) Serhiy Bolbat	(Ukraine) Mariupol	Free	
12 July 2017	DF		(Ukraine) Yuriy Senytskyi	(Ukraine) Mariupol	Free	
22 July 2017	MF	58	(Ukraine) Andriy Korobenko	(Ukraine) Mariupol	Free	
8 August 2017	DF	95	(Ukraine) Eduard Sobol	(Czech Republic) Slavia	Free	
8 August 2017	FW		(Ukraine) Denys Bezborodko	(Ukraine) Desna	Free	
2 September 2017	MF	29	(Ukraine) Andriy Totovytskyi	(Ukraine) Mariupol	Free	
2 September 2017	FW		(Ukraine) Vladyslav Buhay	(Ukraine) Mariupol	Free	
25 January 2018	DF		(Ukraine) Serhiy Vakulenko	(Ukraine) Olimpik	Free	
2 February 2018	DF		(Ukraine) Taras Kacharaba	(Czech Republic) Slovan	Free	
12 February 2018	FW	50	(Ukraine) Pylyp Budkivskyi	(Russia) Anzhi	Free	
12 February 2018	DF	82	(Ukraine) Oleksandr Masalov	(Ukraine) Kolos	Free	
12 February 2018	MF	67	(Ukraine) Oleksandr Pikhalyonok	(Ukraine) Mariupol	Free	
14 February 2018	MF	60	(Ukraine) Oleksiy Zinkevych	(Ukraine) Oleksandriya	Free	
23 February 2018	MF	68	(Ukraine) Denys Arendaruk	(Ukraine) Mariupol	Free	
23 February 2018	MF	73	(Ukraine) Danylo Ihnatenko	(Ukraine) Mariupol	Free	
5 March 2018	MF	24	(Ukraine) Serhiy Hryn	(Ukraine) Arsenal Kyiv	Free	
Total					€400,000	

=== Loan return ===
Date	Position	No.	Player	From club	Fee	Ref.
1 January 2018	FW		(Ukraine) Artur Zahorulko	(Ukraine) Vorskla	Free	
11 January 2018	DF	25	(Ukraine) Mykola Matviyenko	(Ukraine) Vorskla	Free	
14 January 2018	MF	22	(Ukraine) Dmytro Hrechyshkin	(Ukraine) Zorya	Free	
2 February 2018	MF	20	(Ukraine) Vyacheslav Tankovskyi	(Ukraine) Mariupol	Free	
Total					€0	

== Friendlies ==
29 June 2017	Rödinghausen (Germany)	3 – 4	(Ukraine) Shakhtar Donetsk	Marienfeld
18:00 EEST (UTC+3)	Möllering 12'; Steffen 72'; Brosch 87'	Summary	Taison 32'; Ferreyra 55'; Srna 77'; Alan Patrick 85'	Stadium: Hotel-Residence Klosterpforte; Attendance: 0 Referee: Markus Tzyna

1 July 2017	Bochum (Germany)	0 – 2	(Ukraine) Shakhtar Donetsk	Dülmen
17:30 EEST (UTC+3)		Summary	Rakitskiy 15'; Dentinho 43'	Stadium: Stadion am Grenzweg; Attendance: 2,000; Referee: Thorben Siewer

3 July 2017	Odense (Denmark)	2 – 3	(Ukraine) Shakhtar Donetsk	Barsinghausen
17:00 EEST (UTC+3)	Jacobsen 10'; Grytebust (yellow card) 46'; Uzochukwu 49'	Summary	Stepanenko (yellow card) 16'; Taison 47' (pen.), 54'; Ismaily 73'	Stadium: August-Wenzel-Stadion; Attendance: 0 Referee: Harm Osmers

5 July 2017	Holstein (Germany)	0 – 0	(Ukraine) Shakhtar Donetsk	Braunschweig
18:50 EEST (UTC+3)		Summary	Khocholava (yellow card) 84'	Stadium: Eintracht-Stadion; Attendance: 600; Referee: Erik Muller

7 July 2017	Charleroi (Belgium)	2 – 0	(Ukraine) Shakhtar Donetsk	Bochum
EEST (UTC+3)	Pollet 48'; Benavente 76'	Summary		Stadium: Vonovia Ruhrstadion; Attendance: 0 Referee: Bastien Bommer

7 September 2017	FC Mariupol (Ukraine)	2 – 3	(Ukraine) Shakhtar Donetsk	Shchaslyve
11:00 EEST (UTC+03:00)	Bolbat 54' (pen.); Kisil 84'	Report	Blanco Leschuk 7'; Ferreyra 13'; Taison 86'	Stadium: Knyazha Arena; Attendance: 0

20 January 2018	Ludogorets Razgrad (Bulgaria)	2 – 2	(Ukraine) Shakhtar Donetsk	Belek, Turkey
16:00 EEST (UTC+3)	Marcelinho 42'; João Paulo 70'	Summary	Zubkov 57'; Ferreyra 63'	Stadium: Regnum Sports Centre; Attendance: 50

24 January 2018	Dinamo Zagreb (Croatia)	1 – 0	(Ukraine) Shakhtar Donetsk	Belek, Turkey
10:00EEST (UTC+3)	Hodžić 67'	Summary		Stadium: Regnum Sports Centre; Attendance: 100

30 January 2018	Copenhagen (Denmark)	2 – 1	(Ukraine) Shakhtar Donetsk	Dubai
14:00 EEST (UTC+3)	Boilesen (yellow card) 36'; Skov 45'; Ankersen 49'	Summary	Ferreyra (yellow card) 53'; Taison 57'; Rakitskiy (yellow card) 86'	Stadium: Rashid Stadium; Referee: Mohamed Salem Yousef

3 February 2018	Slavia Prague (Czech Republic)	2 – 3	(Ukraine) Shakhtar Donetsk	Dubai
14:00EEST (UTC+3)	Stoch 17', (yellow card) 42'; Hromada (yellow card) 36' van Buren (yellow card) 45'; Škoda 52'; Frydrych (yellow card) 75'	Summary	Ferreyra (yellow card) 28', (goal) 39', 59'; Ismaily 30'; Fred (yellow card) 36'; Rakitskiy (yellow card) 67'	Stadium: Rashid Stadium; Referee: Abdulla Ajel

6 February 2018	Jiangsu Suning (China)	1 – 0	(Ukraine) Shakhtar Donetsk	Dubai
14:00EEST (UTC+3)	Cao Haiqing 77'	Summary		Stadium: Rashid Stadium

7 February 2018	AIK (Sweden)	0 – 2	(Ukraine) Shakhtar Donetsk	Dubai
9:00EEST (UTC+3)		Summary	Rakitskiy (yellow card) 4'; Marlos (yellow card) 4' (yellow-red card) 53' (goal) 48'; Ferreyra 90+2'	Stadium: Nad Al Sheba Sports Complex; Referee: Sultan Mohamed Saleh

== Competitions ==
=== Overall ===
Competition	First match	Last match	Starting round	Final position	Record							
Competition	First match	Last match	Starting round	Final position	Pld	W	D	L	GF	GA	GD	Win %
Premier League	18 July 2017	19 May 2018	Matchday 1	Winners	32	25	5	2	66	24	+42	78.13
Ukrainian Cup	25 October 2017	9 May 2018	Round of 16	Winners	4	4	0	0	7	1	+6	100.00
Super Cup	15 July 2017		Final	Winners	1	0	1	0	1	1	+0	0.00
UEFA Champions League	13 September 2017	13 March 2018	Group Stage	Round of 16	2	1	0	1	2	2	+0	50.00
Total					39	30	6	3	76	28	+48	76.92

Last updated: 19 May 2018
Source: Results

=== Super Cup ===
15 July 2017	Shakhtar Donetsk	2 – 0	Dynamo Kyiv	Odesa
21:00 EEST (UTC+3)	Ferreyra 8', 56'; Stepanenko (yellow card) 28' (yellow-red card) 80'; Bernard (yellow card) 31'	Summary	Buyalskyi (yellow card) 45'; Sydorchuk (yellow card) 90+2'	Stadium: Chornomorets Stadium; Attendance: 34,164; Referee: Kostyantin Trukhanov

=== Premier League ===
==== Regular season ====
===== League table =====
Pos	Team	Pld	W	D	L	GF	GA	GD	Pts	Qualification or relegation
1	Shakhtar Donetsk	22	16	3	3	51	18	+33	51	Qualification for the Championship round
2	Dynamo Kyiv	22	13	6	3	42	20	+22	45	Qualification for the Championship round
3	Vorskla Poltava	22	11	4	7	28	22	+6	37	Qualification for the Championship round
4	Zorya Luhansk	22	8	9	5	38	28	+10	33	Qualification for the Championship round
5	Veres Rivne	22	7	11	4	26	17	+9	32	Qualification for the Championship round

Source: Ukrainian Premier League (in Ukrainian), UEFA, Soccerway
Rules for classification: 1) Points; 2) Goal difference; 3) Goals scored; 4) Head-to-head points; 5) Head-to-head goal difference; 6) Head-to-head goals scored; 7) Draw.

Team 1	Agg.	Team 2	1st leg	2nd leg
Zirka Kropyvnytskyi	1–5	Desna Chernihiv	1–1	0–4
Chornomorets Odesa	1–3	FC Poltava	1–0	0–3 (a.e.t.)

===== Results summary =====
Overall								Home						Away					
Pld	W	D	L	GF	GA	GD	Pts	W	D	L	GF	GA	GD	W	D	L	GF	GA	GD
22	16	3	3	51	18	+33	51	8	1	2	23	6	+17	8	2	1	28	12	+16

===== Results by round =====
Round	1	2	3	4	5	6	7	8	9	10	11	12	13	14	15	16	17	18	19	20	21	22
Ground	A	H	A	H	A	H	A	H	A	A	H	H	A	H	A	H	A	H	A	H	H	A
Result	W	L	W	W	W	W	W	W	D	W	W	W	D	D	W	L	W	W	L	W	W	W
Position	1	4	2	2	2	2	1	1	2	1	1	1	1	1	1	1	1	1	1	1	1	1

Updated to match(es) played on 4 March 2018. Source: Socceraway
A = Away; H = Home; W = Win; D = Draw; L = Loss

===== Results =====
18 July 2017 1	Vorskla Poltava	0 – 3	Shakhtar Donetsk	Poltava
19:00 EEST (UTC+3)	Sklyar (yellow card) 20'; Sapay (yellow card) 65'; Chyzhov (yellow card) 87'	Summary	Ferreyra 27'; Kovalenko (yellow card) 59'; Marlos 66'; Kryvtsov (yellow card) 75'; Alan Patrick 90+4'	Stadium: Vorskla Stadium; Attendance: 11,000; Referee: Yaroslav Kozyk

22 July 2017 2	Shakhtar Donetsk	0 – 1	Dynamo Kyiv	Kharkiv
19:30 EEST (UTC+3)	Marlos (yellow card) 88'	Summary	Mbokani 46'; González (yellow card) 53'; Koval (yellow card) 68'; Sydorchuk (yellow card) 84'; Khacheridi (yellow card) 84'; Korzun (yellow card) 88'	Stadium: OSC Metalist; Attendance: 14,168; Referee: Yuriy Mozharovsky

29 July 2017 3	Stal Dniprodzerzhynsk	1 – 2	Shakhtar Donetsk	Dnipropetrovsk
17:00 EEST (UTC+3)	Kuzyk 9'; Tymchyk (yellow card) 90+3'; Knysh (yellow card) 90+5'; Danielyan (yellow card) 90+6' (yellow-red card) 90+7'	Summary	Taison 45', (yellow card) 52'; Rakitskiy (yellow card) 53'; Stepanenko (yellow card) 82'; Kryvtsov (yellow card) 85'; Fred (yellow card) 90'; Dentinho (yellow card) 90+2'; Blanco Leschuk 90+5'; Marlos (yellow card) 90+6'	Stadium: Meteor Stadium; Attendance: 3,500; Referee: Ivan Bondar

5 August 2017 4	Shakhtar Donetsk	3 – 1	Mariupol	Kharkiv
19:30 EEST (UTC+3)	Bernard 7', (yellow card) 32'; Marlos 42'; Rakitskiy (yellow card) 61'; Kryvtsov 67'; Stepanenko (yellow card) 77'; Petryak (yellow card) 86'	Summary	Tyschenko (yellow card) 62', (goal) 72'; Bilyi (yellow card) 74'	Stadium: OSC Metalist; Attendance: 9,141; Referee: Mykola Balakin

12 August 2017 5	Oleksandriya	1 – 2	Shakhtar Donetsk	Oleksandriya
19:30 EEST (UTC+3)	Banada 38'; Zaporozhan (yellow card) 60'; Batsula (yellow card) 63'	Summary	Stepanenko (yellow card) 29'; Fred 41', (yellow card) 59'; Kryvtsov (yellow card) 45+2'; Srna (yellow card) 54'; Marlos (yellow card) 57'; Kovalenko (yellow card) 59'; Ferreyra 60'	Stadium: CSC Nika; Attendance: 3,816; Referee: Yevhen Aranovsky

19 August 2017 6	Shakhtar Donetsk	2 – 0	Olimpik Donetsk	Kharkiv
19:30 EEST (UTC+3)	Ferreyra 20'; Marlos 57' (pen.); Rakitskiy (yellow card) 89'	Summary	Shabanov (yellow card) 48'; Postupalenko (yellow card) 55'; Lukhtanov (yellow card) 75'	Stadium: OSC Metalist; Attendance: 11,254; Referee: Kostyantin Trukhanov

27 August 2017 7	Veres Rivne	1 – 2	Shakhtar Donetsk	Lviv
17:00 EEST (UTC+3)	Fedorchuk 2'; Stepanyuk (yellow card) 36'; Voloshynovych (yellow card) 68'	Summary	Marlos 55', (yellow card) 66'; Rakitskiy (yellow card) 57'; Fred (yellow card) 80'; Dentinho 88'; Taison (yellow card) 90+5'	Stadium: Arena Lviv; Attendance: 7,027; Referee: Vitaliy Romanov

9 September 2017 8	Shakhtar Donetsk	3 – 1	Zorya Luhansk	Kharkiv
17:00EEST (UTC+3)	Bernard (yellow card) 10', (goal) 89'; Kryvtsov 32'; Opanasenko 70' (o.g.); Khocholava (yellow card) 72'	Summary	Hromov 13'	Stadium: OSC Metalist; Attendance: 10,580; Referee: Kateryna Monzul

17 September 2017 9	Chornomorets Odesa	0 – 0	Shakhtar Donetsk	Odesa
19:30EEST (UTC+3)	Wagué (yellow card) 72'; Politylo (yellow card) 75'; Bamba (yellow card) 81'; Musolitin (yellow card) 90'; Hutar (yellow card) 90+3'	Summary	Fred (yellow card) 90'	Stadium: Chornomorets Stadium; Attendance: 10,642; Referee: Yuriy Mozharovsky

23 September 2017 10	Zirka Kropyvnytskyi	2 – 4	Shakhtar Donetsk	Kropyvnytskyi
14:00EEST (UTC+3)	Zahalskyi (yellow card) 22'; El Hamdaoui 38', (yellow card) 57'; Pryadun (yellow card) 61'; Rassadkin 76', (yellow card) 87'; Polehenko (yellow card) 86'	Summary	Ferreyra 12', 45'; Marlos 44'; Rakitskiy (yellow card) 47'; Stepanenko (yellow card) 57'; Ordets (yellow card) 66'; Petryak (yellow card) 85'; Kovalenko 90+4'	Stadium: Zirka Stadium; Attendance: 3,596; Referee: Yevhen Aranovsky

1 October 2017 11	Shakhtar Donetsk	2 – 0	Karpaty Lviv	Kharkiv
17:00EEST (UTC+3)	Ferreyra 7'; Fedetskyi 65' (o.g.); Ordets (yellow card) 75'; Bernard (yellow card) 89'	Summary	Fedetskyi (yellow card) 45+1'	Stadium: OSC Metalist; Attendance: 10,480; Referee: Oleksandr Derdo

13 October 2017 12	Shakhtar Donetsk	3 – 2	Vorskla Poltava	Kharkiv
19:00EEST (UTC+3)	Marlos 21'; Ferreyra 36', 82'; Rakitskiy (yellow card) 64'; Alan Patrick (yellow card) 66'	Summary	Kolomoyets 42', 57'; Sapay (yellow card) 53'; Sklyar (yellow card) 62'	Stadium: OSC Metalist; Attendance: 6,020; Referee: Yuriy Mozharovsky

22 October 2017 13	Dynamo Kyiv	0 – 0	Shakhtar Donetsk	Kyiv
19:30EEST (UTC+3)	Mbokani (yellow card) 16'; González (yellow card) 43'; Khacheridi (yellow card) 70'; Kędziora (yellow card) 90+3'	Summary	Taison (yellow card) 52'	Stadium: NSC Olimpiyskiy; Attendance: 38,618; Referee: Vitaliy Romanov

28 October 2017 14	Shakhtar Donetsk	1 – 1	Stal Dniprodzerzhynsk	Kharkiv
17:00EEST (UTC+3)	Ferreyra 14', (yellow card) 51'; Khocholava (yellow card) 69'; Ordets (yellow card) 86'	Summary	Danielyan (yellow card) 51'; Meskhi (yellow card) 57'; Tymchyk (yellow card) 57'; Obradović 64'	Stadium: OSC Metalist; Attendance: 2,741; Referee: Serhiy Boyko

5 November 2017 15	Mariupol	1 – 3	Shakhtar Donetsk	Mariupol
14:00EEST (UTC+3)	Ferreyra 30'; Marlos 45+1' (yellow card) 88'; Bernard 56'	Summary	Gomis (yellow card) 14' (yellow-red card) 44'; Kozhanov (yellow card) 45'; Fomin (yellow card) 47' (goal) 49'	Stadium: Illichivets Stadium; Attendance: 11,670; Referee: Viktor Kopiyevskyi

17 November 2017 16	Shakhtar Donetsk	1 – 2	Oleksandriya	Kharkiv
19:00EEST (UTC+3)	Bernard 18'; Fred (yellow card) 64'	Summary	Polyarus 15', 27' (yellow card) 64'; Dovhyi (yellow card) 53'; Pankiv (yellow card) 79'	Stadium: OSC Metalist; Attendance: 4,037; Referee: Mykola Balakin

25 November 2017 17	Olimpik Donetsk	2 – 4	Shakhtar Donetsk	Kyiv
17:00EEST (UTC+3)	Pryyomov 7', 86'; Shabanov (yellow card) 89'	Summary	Ferreyra 6', 39' (pen.); Stepanenko (yellow card) 34'; Bernard 57'; Fred 74' (yellow card) 77'; Petryak (yellow card) 90+1'	Stadium: Dynamo Stadium; Attendance: 1,000; Referee: Yevhen Aranovsky

2 December 2017 18	Shakhtar Donetsk	2 – 0	Veres Rivne	Kharkiv
17:00EEST (UTC+3)	Marlos 50' (pen.) (yellow card) 90'; Ferreyra (yellow card) 65' (goal) 75'; Bernard (yellow card) 69'; Fred (yellow card) 90+1'	Summary	Ischenko (yellow card) 48'; Voloshynovych (yellow card) 64'; Borzenko (yellow card) 66'; Siminin (yellow card) 82'	Stadium: OSC Metalist; Attendance: 1,959; Referee: Denys Shurman

10 December 2017 19	Zorya Luhansk	2 – 1	Shakhtar Donetsk	Zaporizhia
19:30EEST (UTC+3)	Kabayev (yellow card) 47'; Silas (yellow card) 67' (goal) 90+2' (pen.); Butko 90+6' (o.g.)	Summary	Petryak (yellow card) 18' (yellow-red card) 79' (goal) 34'; Bernard (yellow card) 51'; Fred (yellow card) 53' (yellow-red card) 86'; Stepanenko (yellow card) 56'; Dentinho (yellow card) 80'; Rakitskiy (yellow card) 90' (yellow-red card) 90'	Stadium: Slavutych-Arena; Attendance: 3,758; Referee: Serhiy Boyko

16 February 2018 20	Shakhtar Donetsk	5 – 0	Chornomorets Odesa	Kharkiv
19:00EEST (UTC+3)	Ferreyra 20', 41'; Khocholava (yellow card) 24'; Marlos 37', 52'; Kovalenko 90'	Summary	Smirnov (yellow card) 46'; Tatarkov (yellow card) 84'	Stadium: OSC Metalist; Attendance: 2,189; Referee: Vitaliy Romanov

25 February 2018 21	Shakhtar Donetsk	5 – 0	Zirka Kropyvnytskyi	Kharkiv
17:00EEST (UTC+3)	Ferreyra 14', 45'; Kovalenko 19'; Marlos 21', 43' (yellow card) 90+1'; Khocholava (yellow card) 63'; Taison (yellow card) 71'; Fred (yellow card) 76'	Summary	Matkobozhyk (yellow card) 32'; Petrov (yellow card) 35'; Zahalskyi (yellow card) 56'; Tsyupa (yellow card) 60'; Dryshlyuk (yellow card) 74'	Stadium: OSC Metalist; Attendance: 1,517; Referee: Denys Shurman

4 March 2018 22	Karpaty Lviv	0 – 3	Shakhtar Donetsk	Lviv
19:30EEST (UTC+3)	Hutsulyak (yellow card) 28'; Fedetskyi (yellow card) 42'; Shved (yellow card) 90+1'	Summary	Bernard 55'; Alan Patrick 70'; Ismaily 82'	Stadium: Arena Lviv; Attendance: 2,622; Referee: Kostyantyn Trukhanov

==== Championship round ====
===== Table =====
Pos	Team	Pld	W	D	L	GF	GA	GD	Pts	Qualification or relegation
1	Shakhtar Donetsk (C)	32	24	3	5	71	24	+47	75	Qualification for the Champions League group stage
2	Dynamo Kyiv	32	22	7	3	64	25	+39	73	Qualification for the Champions League third qualifying round
3	Vorskla Poltava	32	14	7	11	37	35	+2	49	Qualification for the Europa League group stage (Note: Since the winners of the 2017–18 Ukrainian Cup, Shakhtar Donetsk, qualified for European competition based on league position, the spot awarded to the cup winners (Europa League group stage) was passed to the third-placed team, the spot awarded to the third-placed team (Europa League third qualifying round) was passed to the fourth-placed team, and the spot awarded to the fourth-placed team (Europa League second qualifying round) was passed to the fifth-placed team.)
4	Zorya Luhansk	32	11	10	11	44	44	0	43	Qualification for the Europa League third qualifying round
5	FC Mariupol	32	10	9	13	38	41	−3	39	Qualification for the Europa League second qualifying round

Source: Ukrainian Premier League (in Ukrainian), UEFA, Soccerway
Rules for classification: 1) Points; 2) Goal difference; 3) Goals scored; 4) Head-to-head points; 5) Head-to-head goal difference; 6) Head-to-head goals scored; 7) Draw.
(C) Champions
Notes:

Team 1	Agg.	Team 2	1st leg	2nd leg
Zirka Kropyvnytskyi	1–5	Desna Chernihiv	1–1	0–4
Chornomorets Odesa	1–3	FC Poltava	1–0	0–3 (a.e.t.)

===== Results summary =====
Overall								Home						Away					
Pld	W	D	L	GF	GA	GD	Pts	W	D	L	GF	GA	GD	W	D	L	GF	GA	GD
10	8	0	2	20	6	+14	24	4	0	1	10	4	+6	4	0	1	10	2	+8

===== Results by round =====
Round	1	2	3	4	5	6	7	8	9	10
Ground	A	H	A	A	H	H	A	H	H	A
Result	W	W	W	W	L	W	W	W	W	L
Position	1	1	1	1	1	1	1	1	1	1

Updated to match(es) played on 19 May 2018. Source: Socceraway
A = Away; H = Home; W = Win; D = Draw; L = Loss

===== Results =====
9 March 2018 23	Vorskla Poltava	0 – 3	Shakhtar Donetsk	Poltava
19:00EEST (UTC+3)	Sklyar (yellow card) 25'	Summary	Ferreyra 22', 36'; Stepanenko (yellow card) 27'; Khocholava (yellow card) 65'; Marlos 67' (pen.)	Stadium: Vorskla Stadium; Attendance: 1,500; Referee: Oleksandr Derdo

18 March 2018 24	Shakhtar Donetsk	3 – 0	Mariupol	Kharkiv
17:00EEST (UTC+3)	Ismaily 26'; Marlos 45+3'; Fred 67'; Rakitskiy (yellow card) 68'	Summary	Tyschenko (yellow card) 88'	Stadium: OSC Metalist; Attendance: 1,631; Referee: Yaroslav Kozyk

1 April 2018 25	Zorya Luhansk	0 – 3	Shakhtar Donetsk	Zaporizhia
19:30EEST (UTC+3)	Lunyov (yellow card) 27'; Checher (yellow card) 41'; Silas (yellow card) 63'; Pryima (yellow card) 70'; Opanasenko (red card) 88'; Tymchyk (yellow card) 90+2'; Iury (yellow card) 90+5'	Summary	Ismaily (yellow card) 25'; Taison 41'; Ferreyra 61' (yellow card) 90+1'; Fred (yellow card) 85'; Kayode 90+3'; Khocholava (yellow card) 90+5'	Stadium: Slavutych-Arena; Attendance: 8,350; Referee: Vitaliy Romanov

7 April 2018 26	Veres Rivne	0 – 2	Shakhtar Donetsk	Lviv
14:00EEST (UTC+3)		Summary	Taison 24'; Khocholava 78'	Stadium: Arena Lviv; Attendance: 2,764; Referee: Yuriy Mozharovsky

14 April 2018 27	Shakhtar Donetsk	0 – 1	Dynamo Kyiv	Kharkiv
17:00EEST (UTC+3)	Ferreyra (yellow card) 5'; Rakitskiy (yellow card) 55'; Khocholava (yellow card) 74'; Taison (yellow card) 90+1' (yellow-red card) 90+4'	Summary	Shepelyev 32'; Harmash (yellow card) 54'; Verbič (yellow card) 63'; Shabanov (yellow card) 71'; Mbokani (yellow card) 90+4'	Stadium: OSC Metalist; Attendance: 26,679; Referee: Kostyantin Trukhanov

21 April 2018 28	Shakhtar Donetsk	4 – 2	Vorskla Poltava	Kharkiv
17:00EEST (UTC+3)	Marlos 23', 47' (yellow card) 83'; Stepanenko (yellow card) 27'; Rakitskiy (yellow card) 37'; Kovalenko 50'; Patrick (yellow card) 83' (goal) 88'; Pyatov (yellow card) 87'; Dentinho (yellow card) 90+3'	Summary	Giorgadze (yellow card) 7'; Kolomoyets 53'; Serhiychuk 62'	Stadium: OSC Metalist; Attendance: 4,698; Referee: Anatoliy Abdula

27 April 2018 29	Mariupol	0 – 1	Shakhtar Donetsk	Mariupol
17:00EEST (UTC+3)	Neplyakh (yellow card) 34'	Summary	Kayode 65'; Taison (yellow card) 69'; Khocholava (yellow card) 77'	Stadium: Illichivets Stadium; Attendance: 8,314; Referee: Viktor Kopiyevskyi

5 May 2018 30	Shakhtar Donetsk	2 – 1	Zorya Luhansk	Kharkiv
19:30EEST (UTC+3)	Ferreyra 20' (yellow card) 33'; Taison 89'; Nem (yellow card) 90+2'; Pyatov (yellow card) 90+3'	Summary	Silas (yellow card) 34'; Hordiyenko (yellow card) 35'; Cheberko (yellow card) 50'; Iury 63' (yellow card) 63'; Lytvyn (yellow card) 90+3'	Stadium: OSC Metalist; Attendance: 7,695; Referee: Vitaliy Romanov

13 May 2018 31	Shakhtar Donetsk	1 – 0	Veres Rivne	Kharkiv
19:30EEST (UTC+3)	Marlos 5' (pen.); Kryvtsov (yellow card) 44'; Fred (yellow card) 64'	Summary		Stadium: OSC Metalist; Attendance: 4,660; Referee: Yaroslav Kozyk

19 May 2018 32	Dynamo Kyiv	2 – 1	Shakhtar Donetsk	Kyiv
19:30EEST (UTC+3)	Verbič 16', (yellow card) 90+2'; Kędziora (yellow card) 45'; Buyalskyi (yellow card) 52'; Khocholava 56' (o.g.); Kádár (yellow card) 77'; Sydorchuk (yellow card) 84'; Harmash (yellow card) 90'; Boyko (yellow card) 90+3'	Summary	Marlos 23' (pen.); Khocholava (yellow card) 49'; Patrick (yellow card) 60'; Matviyenko (yellow card) 88'; Rakitskiy (yellow card) 89'; Nem (yellow card) 90'; Dodô (yellow card) 90+3'	Stadium: Dynamo Stadium; Attendance: 15,837; Referee: Vitaliy Romanov

=== Ukrainian Cup ===
25 October 2017 Round of 16	Zorya Luhansk	3 – 4	Shakhtar Donetsk	Zaporizhia
19:00 EEST (UTC+3)	Lunyov 12'; Babenko (yellow card) 38'; Hordiyenko 51'; Lunin (yellow card) 68'; Andriyevskyi (yellow card) 78' (yellow-red card) 82'; Opanasenko (yellow card) 94'; Kharatin 106'	Summary	Stepanenko (yellow card) 28'; Ferreyra (yellow card) 34', (goal) 72', 90+1'; Fred (yellow card) 59'; Kovalenko 99'; Blanco Leschuk 116'	Stadium: Slavutych-Arena; Attendance: 5,511; Referee: Anatoliy Abdula

29 November 2017 Quarter-final	Shakhtar Donetsk	4 – 0	Veres Rivne	Kharkiv
19:30EEST (UTC+3)	Ferreyra 7'; Bernard 45'; Khocholava (yellow card) 49'; Petryak (yellow card) 54'; Fred (yellow card) 59'; Marlos 63'; Stepanenko (yellow card) 78'; Blanco Leschuk 83'	Summary	Zapadnya (yellow card) 27'; Pasich (yellow card) 90+2'	Stadium: OSC Metalist; Attendance: 1,350; Referee: Vitaliy Romanov

18 April 2018 Semi-final	Shakhtar Donetsk	5 – 1	Mariupol	Kharkiv
19:00EEST (UTC+3)	Taison 8', 45+2'; Marlos 38'; Matviyenko (yellow card) 48'; Kayode 74'; Petryak 81'	Summary	Neplyakh (yellow card) 14'; Tyschenko 22'; Bykov (yellow card) 63'; Dedechko (yellow card) 75'	Stadium: OSC Metalist; Attendance: 2,671; Referee: Yevhen Aranovsky

9 May 2018 Final	Dynamo Kyiv	0 – 2	Shakhtar Donetsk	Dnipro
20:30EEST (UTC+3)	Besyedin (yellow card) 28'; Kędziora (yellow card) 63'; Shepelyev (yellow card) 68'; Harmash (yellow card) 80'	Summary	Fred (yellow card) 32'; Ferreyra 47'; Rakitskiy 61'; Stepanenko (yellow card) 83'	Stadium: Dnipro-Arena; Attendance: 28,155; Referee: Yuriy Mozharovsky

=== UEFA Champions League ===
==== Group stage ====
Pos	Team	Pld	W	D	L	GF	GA	GD	Pts	Qualification	MCI	SHK	NAP	FEY
1	(England) Manchester City	6	5	0	1	14	5	+9	15	Advance to knockout phase	—	2–0	2–1	1–0
2	(Ukraine) Shakhtar Donetsk	6	4	0	2	9	9	0	12	Advance to knockout phase	2–1	—	2–1	3–1
3	(Italy) Napoli	6	2	0	4	11	11	0	6	Transfer to Europa League	2–4	3–0	—	3–1
4	(Netherlands) Feyenoord	6	1	0	5	5	14	−9	3		0–4	1–2	2–1	—

Source: UEFA
Rules for classification: Group stage tiebreakers

13 September 2017 1	Shakhtar Donetsk (Ukraine)	2 – 1	(Italy) Napoli	Kharkiv, Ukraine
21:45 EEST (UTC+3)	Taison 15'; Ferreyra 58'; Fred (yellow card) 68'; Stepanenko (yellow card) 71'	Report	Insigne (yellow card) 68'; Mertens (yellow card) 69'; Milik 72' (pen.); Koulibaly (yellow card) 82'	Stadium: Metalist Stadium; Attendance: 32,679; Referee: Felix Zwayer (Germany)

26 September 2017 2	Manchester City (England)	2 – 0	(Ukraine) Shakhtar Donetsk	Manchester, England
21:45 EEST (UTC+3)	De Bruyne 48'; Sterling 90'	Report	Ordets (yellow card) 66'	Stadium: City of Manchester Stadium; Attendance: 45,310; Referee: Jorge Sousa (Portugal)

17 October 2017 3	Feyenoord (Netherlands)	1 – 2	(Ukraine) Shakhtar Donetsk	Rotterdam, Netherlands
21:45 EEST (UTC+3)	Berghuis 8'; El Ahmadi (yellow card) 66'; Amrabat (yellow card) 87'	Report	Bernard 24', 54'; Rakitskiy (yellow card) 48' (yellow-red card) 75'; Taison (yellow card) 64'; Kovalenko (yellow card) 77'; Butko (yellow card) 90+3'	Stadium: De Kuip; Attendance: 43,500; Referee: Alberto Undiano Mallenco (Spain)

1 November 2017 4	Shakhtar Donetsk (Ukraine)	3 – 1	(Netherlands) Feyenoord	Kharkiv, Ukraine
21:45 EEST (UTC+3)	Ferreyra 14'; Marlos 17', 68'; Khocholava (yellow card) 36'	Report	Jørgensen 12'; Berghuis (yellow card) 49'; El Ahmadi (yellow card) 54'	Stadium: Metalist Stadium; Attendance: 24,570; Referee: Anastasios Sidiropoulos (Greece)

21 November 2017 5	Napoli (Italy)	3 – 0	(Ukraine) Shakhtar Donetsk	Naples, Italy
21:45 EEST (UTC+3)	Maggio (yellow card) 25'; Insigne 56'; Chiricheș (yellow card) 77'; Zieliński 81'; Mertens 83'; Reina (yellow card) 85'	Report	Ismaily (yellow card) 78'; Ferreyra (yellow card) 85'	Stadium: Stadio San Paolo; Attendance: 10,573; Referee: Damir Skomina (Slovenia)

6 December 2017 6	Shakhtar Donetsk (Ukraine)	2 – 1	(England) Manchester City	Kharkiv, Ukraine
21:45 EEST (UTC+3)	Bernard 26'; Ismaily 32'; Rakitskiy (yellow card) 54'	Report	Danilo (yellow card) 22'; Gündoğan (yellow card) 57'; Agüero 90+2' (pen.)	Stadium: Metalist Stadium; Attendance: 33,154; Referee: Benoît Bastien (France)

==== Knockout stage ====
21 February 2018 Round of 16 1st leg	Shakhtar Donetsk (Ukraine)	2 – 1	(Italy) AS Roma	Kharkiv, Ukraine
21:45 EET (UTC+2)	Ferreyra 52' (yellow card) 80'; Fred 71'; Taison (yellow card) 90+1'	Report	Ünder 41'; Perotti (yellow card) 90+1'	Stadium: Metalist Stadium; Attendance: 35,124; Referee: Willie Collum (Scotland)

13 March 2018 Round of 16 2nd leg	AS Roma (Italy)	1 – 0 (2a–2 agg.)	(Ukraine) Shakhtar Donetsk	Rome, Italy
21:45 EET (UTC+2)	Florenzi (yellow card) 39'; Džeko 52'; Manolas (yellow card) 54'	Report	Stepanenko (yellow card) 71'; Fred (yellow card) 76'; Ordets (red card) 79'; Ferreyra (yellow card) 80'	Stadium: Stadio Olimpico; Attendance: 47,693; Referee: Alberto Undiano Mallenco (Spain)

== Squad statistics ==
As of match played 19 May 2018

=== Appearances and goals ===
No.	Pos	Nat	Player	Total		Premier League		Ukrainian Cup		UEFA Champions League		Supercup	
No.	Pos	Nat	Player	Apps	Goals	Apps	Goals	Apps	Goals	Apps	Goals	Apps	Goals
2	DF	(Ukraine) UKR	Bohdan Butko	29	0	19+1	0	2	0	7	0	0	0
4	DF	(Ukraine) UKR	Serhiy Kryvtsov	15	3	13	2	0	1	1	0	1	0
5	DF	(Georgia (country)) GEO	Davit Khocholava	22	1	12+2	1	3+1	0	1+3	0	0	0
6	MF	(Ukraine) UKR	Taras Stepanenko	38	0	24+2	0	3	0	8	0	1	0
7	MF	(Brazil) BRA	Taison	36	7	20+4	4	3	2	8	1	1	0
8	MF	(Brazil) BRA	Fred	37	4	25+1	3	3	0	8	1	0	0
9	FW	(Brazil) BRA	Dentinho	34	1	6+19	1	2+1	0	0+5	0	0+1	0
10	MF	(Brazil) BRA	Bernard	29	10	18+1	6	1	1	8	3	1	0
11	MF	(Ukraine) UKR	Marlos	41	22	28+1	18	3	2	8	2	1	0
12	MF	(Brazil) BRA	Wellington Nem	3	0	0+3	0	0	0	0	0	0	0
17	MF	(Ukraine) UKR	Maksym Malyshev	3	0	0+1	0	0+1	0	0	0	1	0
18	DF	(Ukraine) UKR	Ivan Ordets	27	0	15+1	0	2	0	7+1	0	0+1	0
19	FW	(Argentina) ARG	Facundo Ferreyra	42	30	29+1	21	3	4	8	3	1	2
20	MF	(Ukraine) UKR	Vyacheslav Tankovskyi	1	0	0+1	0	0	0	0	0	0	0
21	MF	(Brazil) BRA	Alan Patrick	32	3	18+7	3	3+1	0	0+3	0	0	0
22	DF	(Ukraine) UKR	Mykola Matviyenko	4	0	1+2	0	1	0	0	0	0	0
24	MF	(Ukraine) UKR	Dmytro Hrechyshkin	1	0	0+1	0	0	0	0	0	0	0
26	GK	(Ukraine) UKR	Mykyta Shevchenko	1	0	1	0	0	0	0	0	0	0
30	GK	(Ukraine) UKR	Andriy Pyatov	44	0	31	0	4	0	8	0	1	0
31	DF	(Brazil) BRA	Ismaily	41	3	29	2	3	0	8	1	1	0
33	DF	(Croatia) CRO	Darijo Srna	10	0	8	0	0	0	1	0	1	0
34	MF	(Ukraine) UKR	Ivan Petryak	17	2	6+8	1	1+1	1	0+1	0	0	0
44	DF	(Ukraine) UKR	Yaroslav Rakitskiy	34	1	23	0	3	1	7	0	1	0
59	MF	(Ukraine) UKR	Oleksandr Zubkov	11	0	2+6	0	1+1	0	0+1	0	0	0
74	MF	(Ukraine) UKR	Viktor Kovalenko	37	5	16+11	4	2+2	1	0+5	0	0+1	0
88	FW	(Nigeria) NGR	Olarenwaju Kayode	8	3	3+3	2	1+1	1	0	0	0	0
98	DF	(Brazil) BRA	Dodô	3	0	1+1	0	1	0	0	0	0	0
99	FW	(Argentina) ARG	Gustavo Blanco Leschuk	17	3	0+15	1	0+2	2	0	0	0	0
Players who left Shakhtar Donetsk during the season:
66	DF	(Brazil) BRA	Márcio Azevedo	6	0	3+2	0	0	0	0+1	0	0	0
67	MF	(Ukraine) UKR	Oleksandr Pikhalyonok	1	0	0+1	0	0	0	0	0	0	0

=== Goalscorers ===
Place	Position	Nation	Number	Name	Premier League	Ukrainian Cup	Super Cup	Champions League	Total
1	FW	(Argentina)	19	Facundo Ferreyra	21	4	2	3	30
2	MF	(Ukraine)	11	Marlos	18	2	0	2	22
3	MF	(Brazil)	10	Bernard	6	1	0	3	10
4	MF	(Brazil)	7	Taison	4	2	0	1	7
5	MF	(Ukraine)	74	Viktor Kovalenko	4	1	0	0	5
6	MF	(Brazil)	8	Fred	3	0	0	1	4
7	FW	(Argentina)	99	Gustavo Blanco Leschuk	1	2	0	0	3
7	DF	(Brazil)	31	Ismaily	2	0	0	1	3
7	MF	(Brazil)	21	Alan Patrick	3	0	0	0	3
7	FW	(Nigeria)	88	Olarenwaju Kayode	2	1	0	0	3
11	DF	(Ukraine)	4	Serhiy Kryvtsov	2	0	0	0	2
11	MF	(Ukraine)	34	Ivan Petryak	1	1	0	0	2
11				Own goal	2	0	0	0	2
14	MF	(Brazil)	9	Dentinho	1	0	0	0	1
14	DF	(Georgia (country))	5	Davit Khocholava	1	0	0	0	1
14	DF	(Ukraine)	44	Yaroslav Rakitskiy	0	1	0	0	1
TOTALS					71	15	2	11	99

=== Clean sheets ===
Place	Position	Nation	Number	Name	Premier League	Ukrainian Cup	Super Cup	Champions League	Total
1	GK	(Ukraine)	30	Andriy Pyatov	15	2	1	0	18
TOTALS					15	2	1	0	18

=== Disciplinary record ===
Number	Nation	Position	Name	Premier League		Ukrainian Cup		Champions League		Super Cup		Total	
Number	Nation	Position	Name	Yellow card	Red card	Yellow card	Red card	Yellow card	Red card	Yellow card	Red card	Yellow card	Red card
2	(Ukraine)	DF	Bohdan Butko	0	0	0	0	1	0	0	0	1	0
4	(Ukraine)	DF	Serhiy Kryvtsov	4	0	0	0	0	0	0	0	4	0
5	(Georgia (country))	DF	Davit Khocholava	9	0	1	0	1	0	0	0	11	0
6	(Ukraine)	MF	Taras Stepanenko	8	0	3	0	2	0	2	1	15	1
7	(Brazil)	MF	Taison	7	1	0	0	2	0	0	0	9	1
8	(Brazil)	MF	Fred	12	1	3	0	1	0	0	0	16	1
9	(Brazil)	FW	Dentinho	3	0	0	0	1	0	0	0	4	0
10	(Brazil)	MF	Bernard	5	0	0	0	0	0	1	0	6	0
11	(Ukraine)	MF	Marlos	8	0	0	0	0	0	0	0	8	0
12	(Brazil)	MF	Wellington Nem	2	0	0	0	0	0	0	0	2	0
18	(Ukraine)	DF	Ivan Ordets	3	0	0	0	1	1	0	0	4	1
19	(Argentina)	FW	Facundo Ferreyra	5	0	1	0	3	0	0	0	9	0
21	(Brazil)	MF	Alan Patrick	3	0	0	0	0	0	0	0	3	0
22	(Ukraine)	DF	Mykola Matviyenko	1	0	1	0	0	0	0	0	2	0
30	(Ukraine)	GK	Andriy Pyatov	2	0	0	0	0	0	0	0	2	0
31	(Brazil)	DF	Ismaily	1	0	0	0	1	0	0	0	2	0
33	(Croatia)	DF	Darijo Srna	1	0	0	0	0	0	0	0	1	0
34	(Ukraine)	MF	Ivan Petryak	5	1	1	0	0	0	0	0	6	1
44	(Ukraine)	DF	Yaroslav Rakitskiy	12	1	0	0	3	1	0	0	15	2
74	(Ukraine)	MF	Viktor Kovalenko	2	0	0	0	1	0	0	0	3	0
98	(Brazil)	DF	Dodô	1	0	0	0	0	0	0	0	1	0
			TOTALS	93	4	10	0	17	2	3	1	123	7

== Notes ==
4. Shakhtar Donetsk play their home matches at Metalist Stadium, Kharkiv instead of their regular stadium, Donbas Arena, Donetsk, due to the War in Donbas.
