= Vyacheslav Tankovskyi =

Ukrainian footballer

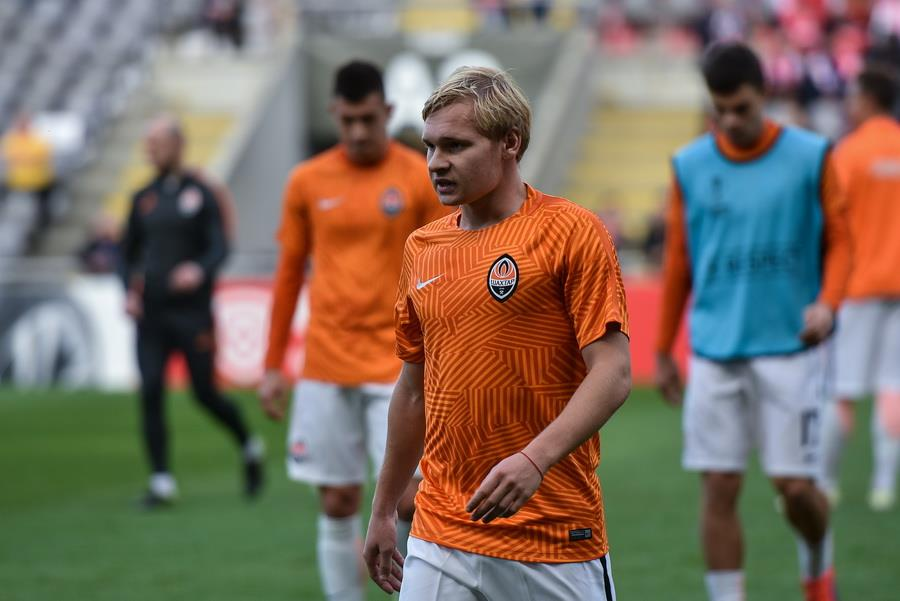

Personal information
- Full name: Vyacheslav Serhiyovych Tankovskyi
- Date of birth: 16 August 1995 (age 31)
- Place of birth: Novomoskovsk, Ukraine
- Height: 1.69 m (5 ft 7 in)
- Position: Midfielder

Team information
- Current team: LNZ Cherkasy
- Number: 6

Youth career
- 2006–2007: Youth Sportive School Novomoskovsk
- 2006–2008: Inter Dnipropetrovsk
- 2008–2015: Shakhtar Donetsk

Senior career*
Years	Team	Apps	(Gls)
2015–2021	Shakhtar Donetsk	5	(0)
2015–2016	→ Zorya Luhansk (loan)	13	(0)
2017	→ Mariupol (loan)	9	(0)
2019	→ Arsenal Kyiv (loan)	12	(1)
2019–2021	→ Mariupol (loan)	24	(1)
2021–2023	Metalist Kharkiv	28	(0)
2023	→ Dnipro-1 (loan)	7	(0)
2023–2024	Polissya Zhytomyr	27	(2)
2024–26	LNZ Cherkasy	29	(1)
2026 -	FSC Bukovyna Chernivtsi	5	(0)

International career^{‡}
2011	Ukraine U16	3	(1)
2011–2012	Ukraine U17	18	(2)
2012–2013	Ukraine U18	8	(0)
2013–2014	Ukraine U19	9	(0)
2015	Ukraine U20	4	(0)
- * Club domestic league appearances and goals as of 3 June 2026 ‡ National team caps and goals as of 5 August 2023

Vyacheslav Serhiyovych Tankovskyi (Ukrainian: В'ячеслав Сергійович Танковський; born 16 August 1995) is a Ukrainian professional footballer who plays as a midfielder for LNZ Cherkasy in the Ukrainian Premier League.

== Career ==
Tankovskyi is a product of the FC Inter Dnipropetrovsk youth sportive school and signed a contract with FC Shakhtar Donetsk Football Academy in 2008.

He played three years for the FC Shakhtar Donetsk Reserves and Youth Team in the Ukrainian Premier League Reserves Championship and in July 2015 went on loan to FC Zorya in the Ukrainian Premier League. Tankovskyi made his debut for FC Zorya playing as a substitute player in a match against FC Stal Dniprodzerzhynsk on 2 August 2015 in the Ukrainian Premier League.

== Career statistics ==
=== Club ===
As of 20 December 2018

Club	Season	League			Ukrainian Cup		Champions League		Europa League		Ukrainian Super Cup		Total	
Club	Season	Division	Apps	Goals	Apps	Goals	Apps	Goals	Apps	Goals	Apps	Goals	Apps	Goals
Zorya (loan)	2015–16	Ukrainian Premier League	13	0	5	1	0	0	0	0	0	0	18	1
Total			13	0	5	1	0	0	0	0	0	0	18	1
Mariupol (loan)	2017–18	Ukrainian Premier League	9	0	3	1	0	0	0	0	0	0	12	1
Total			9	0	3	1	0	0	0	0	0	0	12	1
Shakhtar	2016–17	Ukrainian Premier League	4	0	1	0	0	0	2	0	0	0	7	0
Shakhtar	2017–18	Ukrainian Premier League	1	0	0	0	0	0	0	0	0	0	1	0
Shakhtar	2018–19	Ukrainian Premier League	0	0	0	0	0	0	0	0	0	0	0	0
Total			5	0	1	0	0	0	2	0	0	0	8	0
Career total			27	0	9	2	0	0	2	0	0	0	38	2

== Honours ==
=== Club ===
Shakhtar

- Ukrainian Premier League: 2016–17, 2017–18
- Ukrainian Cup: 2016–17, 2017–18
- Ukrainian Super Cup: 2017
