= Andriy Boryachuk =

Ukrainian footballer

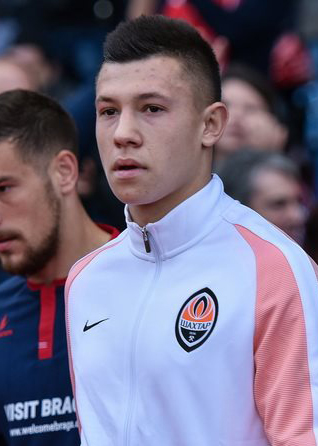

Personal information
- Full name: Andriy Vasylyovych Boryachuk
- Date of birth: 23 April 1996 (age 30)
- Place of birth: Vinnytsia, Ukraine
- Height: 1.76 m (5 ft 9 1/2 in)
- Position: Forward

Team information
- Current team: Nyva Ternopil
- Number: 23

Youth career
- 2008–2015: Shakhtar Donetsk

Senior career*
Years	Team	Apps	(Gls)
2015–2023	Shakhtar Donetsk	12	(4)
2017–2019	→ Mariupol (loan)	44	(12)
2020	→ Çaykur Rizespor (loan)	5	(0)
2020	→ Mezőkövesd (loan)	6	(0)
2021–2022	→ Rukh Lviv (loan)	23	(6)
2022–2023	→ Metalist 1925 Kharkiv (loan)	8	(3)
2023–2025	Metalist 1925 Kharkiv	39	(7)
2025–26	Epitsentr Kamianets-Podilskyi	12	(1)
2026-	FC Nyva Ternopil	0	(0)

International career^{‡}
2011–2012	Ukraine U16	5	(0)
2012–2013	Ukraine U17	13	(6)
2013–2014	Ukraine U18	10	(3)
2014–2015	Ukraine U19	11	(4)
2016–2018	Ukraine U21	12	(6)
2018–	Ukraine	2	(0)
- * Club domestic league appearances and goals as of 24 December 2025 ‡ National team caps and goals as of 1 August 2023

Andriy Vasylyovych Boryachuk (Ukrainian: Андрій Васильович Борячук; born 23 April 1996) is a Ukrainian professional footballer who plays as a forward for Epitsentr Kamianets-Podilskyi.

== Career ==
=== Shakhtar Donetsk ===
Boryachuk is a product of the Shakhtar Donetsk academy. During his debut season in the Ukrainian Premier League he managed to earn his first hat-trick in the game against FC Hoverla Uzhhorod. In 2015–16 season Boryachuk scored twice against a principal contender FC Dnipro Dnipropetrovsk earning a 2:0 victory for Shakhtar on 13 August 2015. While officially listed for the under 21 team with his efforts alone the "Miners" senior team were victorious in a number of other games against such clubs as Metalist, Karpaty, Olimpik, and others. By the winter recess of 2015–16 season, Boryachuk managed to earn another hat-trick and a poker (four goal game).

== International ==
=== Ukraine ===
He made his debut for Ukraine national football team on 16 November 2018 in a 2018–19 UEFA Nations League B game against Slovakia, as a starter.

== Honours ==
=== Club ===
Shakhtar

- Ukrainian Premier League: 2016–17
- Ukrainian Cup: 2015–16, 2016–17
- Ukrainian Super Cup: 2017

== Career statistics ==
=== Club ===
As of 22 December 2020

Club	Season	League			Cup		Continental		Other		Total	
Club	Season	Division	Apps	Goals	Apps	Goals	Apps	Goals	Apps	Goals	Apps	Goals
Shakhtar	2015–16	Ukrainian Premier League	0	0	2	2	1	0	0	0	3	2
Shakhtar	2016–17	Ukrainian Premier League	7	3	1	0	3	0	0	0	11	3
Total			7	3	3	2	4	0	0	0	14	5
Mariupol (loan)	2017–18	Ukrainian Premier League	18	5	2	3	0	0	0	0	20	8
Mariupol (loan)	2018–19	Ukrainian Premier League	26	7	0	0	2	0	0	0	28	7
Total			44	12	2	3	2	0	0	0	48	15
Çaykur Rizespor (loan)	2019–20	Süper Lig	5	0	1	0	0	0	0	0	6	0
Total			5	0	1	0	0	0	0	0	6	0
Mezőkövesd (loan)	2020–21	Nemzeti Bajnokság I	6	0	2	3	0	0	0	0	8	3
Total			6	0	2	3	0	0	0	0	8	3
Career total			62	15	8	8	6	0	0	0	76	23
