= Amran Al-Jassasi =

Omani footballer (born 1996)

Personal information
- Date of birth: 11 March 1996 (age 30)
- Place of birth: Oman
- Height: 1.67 m (5 ft 6 in)
- Position: Full back

Youth career
- Khor Fakkan
- Al Jazira
- Al Ain

Senior career*
Years	Team	Apps	(Gls)
2018	Stumbras	5	(0)
2019	Sharjah	0	(0)
2019–2022	Al Dhafra	49	(0)
2022–2023	Al Nasr	8	(0)
2023–2024	Emirates	4	(0)
- * Club domestic league appearances and goals as of 18:04, 16 November 2019 (UTC)

Amran Al-Jassasi (born 11 March 1996), is an Omani professional footballer who plays as a full back.

== Career statistics ==
=== Club ===
As of 16 November 2019.

Club	Season	League			Cup		Continental		Other		Total	
Club	Season	Division	Apps	Goals	Apps	Goals	Apps	Goals	Apps	Goals	Apps	Goals
Stumbras	2018	A Lyga	5	0	0	0	1 (Note: Appearances in the UEFA Europa League)	0	0	0	6	0
Sharjah	2018–19	UAE Pro League	0	0	0	0	–		0	0	0	0
Al Dhafra	2019–20	UAE Pro League	6	0	0	0	–		0	0	6	0
Career total			11	0	0	0	1	0	0	0	12	0
