= Artem Merkushov =

Ukrainian footballer

Personal information
- Full name: Artem Albertovych Merkushov
- Date of birth: 7 June 1996 (age 30)
- Place of birth: Mariupol, Ukraine
- Height: 1.70 m (5 ft 7 in)
- Position: Midfielder

Youth career
- 2009–2012: Illichivets Mariupol
- 2012–2013: Shakhtar Donetsk

Senior career*
Years	Team	Apps	(Gls)
2013–2014	Illichivets Mariupol	0	(0)
2014–2015	Shakhtar Donetsk	0	(0)
2014	→ Shakhtar-3 Donetsk	3	(1)
2015–2017	Sumy	31	(1)
2017	Mariupol	0	(0)
2018	Polissya Zhytomyr	14	(2)
2019	Bukovyna Chernivtsi		
2020–2021	USK Dovbush		

International career
2012	Ukraine-16	8	(1)
2013	Ukraine-17	4	(1)
- * Club domestic league appearances and goals as of 4 March 2019

Artem Merkushov (Ukrainian: Артем Альбертович Меркушов; born 7 June 1996) is a Ukrainian football midfielder.

== Career ==
Merkushov is a product of the FC Mariupol and FC Shakhtar youth sportive schools.

In July 2017 he returned to the newly promoted Ukrainian Premier League club FC Mariupol.
