= Oleksandr Luchyk =

Ukrainian footballer

Personal information
- Full name: Oleksandr Yuriyovych Luchyk
- Date of birth: 30 March 1994 (age 32)
- Place of birth: Vyzhnytsia, Ukraine
- Height: 1.78 m (5 ft 10 in)
- Position: Midfielder

Team information
- Current team: KS CK Troszyn
- Number: 14

Youth career
- 2007–2009: Youth Sportive School Ivano-Frankivsk
- 2009: Monolit Illichivsk
- 2009–2011: Illichivets Mariupol

Senior career*
Years	Team	Apps	(Gls)
2011–2014	Illichivets Mariupol	0	(0)
2014–2015	Sumy	17	(0)
2015–2017	Illichivets Mariupol	4	(0)
2016	→ Sumy (loan)	18	(0)
2017	→ Poltava (loan)	1	(0)
2017–2018	Mykolaiv	18	(0)
2018	Avanhard Kramatorsk	6	(0)
2019–2022	Alians Lypova Dolyna	57	(1)
2022–2023	SV Auersmacher	12	(1)
2023–	KS CK Troszyn	84	(8)

International career
2011–2012	Ukraine U18	11	(2)
- * Club domestic league appearances and goals as of 22:22, 3 June 2026 (UTC)

Oleksandr Yuriyovych Luchyk (Ukrainian: Олександр Юрійович Лучик; born 30 March 1994) is a Ukrainian professional footballer who plays as a midfielder for Polish club KS CK Troszyn.

== Career ==
Luchyk is product of some youth sportive systems, including the FC Illichivets Mariupol sportive school.

He signed his contract with FC Illichivets Mariupol in the Ukrainian Premier League in February 2015 and returned to this club after half-year absence.

== Honours ==
KS CK Troszyn

- IV liga Masovia: 2024–25
- Polish Cup (Ciechanów-Ostrołęka regionals): 2023–24, 2024–25
