= Andriy Totovytskyi =

Ukrainian footballer

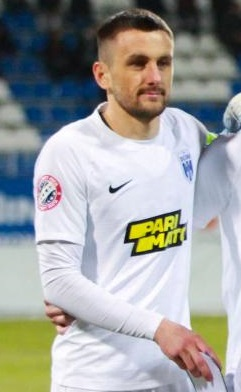

Personal information
- Full name: Andriy Oleksandrovych Totovytskyi
- Date of birth: 20 January 1993 (age 33)
- Place of birth: Krychylsk, Rivne Oblast, Ukraine
- Height: 1.87 m (6 ft 2 in)
- Position: Midfielder

Youth career
- 2006–2009: RVUFK Kyiv
- 2009–2010: Dynamo Kyiv

Senior career*
Years	Team	Apps	(Gls)
2010–2019	Shakhtar Donetsk	7	(0)
2010–2012	→ Shakhtar-3 Donetsk	39	(8)
2013–2015	→ Illichivets Mariupol (loan)	32	(7)
2015–2016	→ Zorya Luhansk (loan)	24	(6)
2016–2017	→ Kortrijk (loan)	21	(5)
2017–2018	→ Mariupol (loan)	22	(5)
2020–2021	Desna Chernihiv	43	(16)
2022	Kolos Kovalivka	0	(0)
2022–2025	Shakhtar Donetsk	9	(0)
2023–2024	→ Kolos Kovalivka (loan)	6	(0)
2025	Kudrivka	6	(1)
2026	Mayak Sarny	0	(0)

International career^{‡}
2009	Ukraine U17	1	(0)
2013	Ukraine U21	12	(7)
- * Club domestic league appearances and goals as of 3 May 2026 ‡ National team caps and goals as of 1 September 2023

Andriy Oleksandrovych Totovytskyi (Ukrainian: Андрій Олександрович Тотовицький; born 20 January 1993) is a Ukrainian professional footballer.

== Career ==
=== Shakhtar Donetsk ===
==== Loan to Illichivets Mariupol ====
From June 2013, he played for FC Illichivets Mariupol, on loan from Shakhtar Donetsk.

==== Loan to Zorya Luhansk ====
In 2015, he was loaned to Zorya Luhansk, which placed 7th in the 2015–16 Ukrainian Premier League and reached the final of the 2015–16 Ukrainian Cup.

==== Loan to Kortrijk ====
In August 2016, he was loaned to Kortrijk.

==== 2018–19 season ====
In 2018–19, he played on the Shakhtar Donetsk team that won the 2018–19 Ukrainian Premier League and the Ukrainian Cup.

=== Desna Chernihiv ===
In 2020, he moved to Desna Chernihiv, signing a contract for 2 years.

On 27 September 2020, he scored a penalty against Rukh Lviv at Chernihiv Stadium, which was his first Ukrainian Premier League appearance for the club.

On 21 February 2021, he debuted as captain of Desna Chernihiv against Dynamo Kyiv at Valeriy Lobanovskyi Dynamo Stadium. On 10 April, he scored two goals against Oleksandriya, and won player of the week honours.

=== Kolos Kovalivka ===
In December 2021, he moved to Kolos Kovalivka in the Ukrainian Premier League.

=== Return to Shakhtar Donetsk ===
In July 2022, he returned to Shakhtar Donetsk.

=== Kudrivka ===
In August 2025 he moved to Kudrivka in Ukrainian Premier League. On 3 August 2025, he made his debut against Oleksandriya at the Obolon Arena replacing Andriy Storchous. 26 September 2025, he scored his first goal with the new club against Epitsentr by penalty. In December 2025 he was released by the club.

=== Mayak Sarny ===
In March 2026, he moved to Mayak Sarny. On 10 June 2026, he retired from professional football.

== Outside of professional football ==
In March 2022, during the Siege of Chernihiv, Totovytskyi held a charity auction on his Instagram page. Viewers had the opportunity to compete for a T-shirt of one of the Chernihiv favorites. In addition, the footballer promised the winner would receive new shoes as a bonus. On 15 June 2025, on the occasion of the 65th anniversary of the foundation of Desna Chernihiv, he took part in the match of Desna Chernihiv stars against the football stars of the Chernihiv's region at the Chernihiv Arena, with the specific goal of raising 1,000,000 hryvnias to support the public organization EVUM, which has been working with children with cancer for over 12 years.

== Career statistics ==
=== Club ===
As of 28 October 2026

Appearances and goals by club, season, and competition
Club	Season	League			Cup		Continentanl		Super Cup		Total	
Club	Season	Division	Apps	Goals	Apps	Goals	Apps	Goals	Apps	Goals	Apps	Goals
Shakhtar Donetsk	2012–13	Ukrainian Premier League	0	0	0	0	0	0	0	0	0	0
Shakhtar Donetsk	2016–17	Ukrainian Premier League	1	0	0	0	0	0	0	0	1	0
Shakhtar Donetsk	2018–19	Ukrainian Premier League	6	0	1	1	0	0	1	0	8	1
Shakhtar Donetsk	Total		7	0	1	1	0	0	1	0	9	1
Shakhtar-3 (loan)	2010–11	Ukrainian Second League	13	1	0	0	–		0	0	13	1
Shakhtar-3 (loan)	2011–12	Ukrainian Second League	26	7	0	0	–		0	0	26	7
Shakhtar-3 (loan)	Total		39	8	0	0	0	0	0	0	39	8
Illichivets (loan)	2013–14	Ukrainian Premier League	18	4	0	0	–		0	0	18	4
Illichivets (loan)	2014–15	Ukrainian Premier League	14	3	2	1	–		0	0	16	4
Illichivets (loan)	Total		32	7	2	1	0	0	0	0	34	8
Zorya (loan)	2014–15	Ukrainian Premier League	9	1	2	0	0	0	0	0	11	1
Zorya (loan)	2015–16	Ukrainian Premier League	15	5	5	2	0	0	0	0	20	7
Zorya (loan)	Total		24	6	7	2	0	0	0	0	31	8
Kortrijk (loan)	2016–17	Belgian First Division A	21	5	2	1	0	0	0	0	23	6
Mariupol (loan)	2017–18	Ukrainian Premier League	22	5	3	1	–		0	0	25	6
Desna Chernihiv	2019–20	Ukrainian Premier League	12	4	1	–		0	0	0	13	4
Desna Chernihiv	2020–21	Ukrainian Premier League	18	9	1	0	1 (Note: one appearance in Europa League third qualifying round)	0	0	0	20	9
Desna Chernihiv	2021–22	Ukrainian Premier League	13	3	1	–		0	0	0	14	3
Desna Chernihiv	Total		43	16	3	0	1	0	0	0	49	16
Kolos Kovalivka	2021–22	Ukrainian Premier League	0	0	0	0	0	0	0	0	0	0
Shakhtar Donetsk	2022–23	Ukrainian Premier League	9	0	0	0	1 (Note: one appearance in 2022–23 UEFA Champions League)	0	0	0	10	0
Shakhtar Donetsk	2024–25	Ukrainian Premier League	0	0	0	0	0	0	0	0	0	0
Shakhtar Donetsk	Total		9	0	0	0	1	0	0	0	10	0
Kolos Kovalivka (loan)	2023–24	Ukrainian Premier League	6	0	0	0	0	0	0	0	6	0
Kudrivka	2025–26	Ukrainian Premier League	6	1	0	0	0	0	0	0	6	1
Mayak Sarny	2025–26	Ukrainian Amateur League	0	0	0	0	0	0	0	0	0	0
Mayak Sarny	2026–27	Ukrainian Amateur League	0	0	3	1	0	0	0	0	3	1
Career total			209	48	21	7	2	0	1	0	233	55

== Honours ==
Shakhtar Donetsk

- Ukrainian Premier League: 2016–17, 2018–19, 2022–23
- Ukrainian Cup: 2018–19, 2024–25
- Ukrainian Super Cup: runner up 2018

Zorya Luhansk

- Ukrainian Cup: runner-up 2015–16

Mayak Sarny

- Ukrainian Amateur Cup: runner-up 2025–26

Ukraine U21

- Commonwealth of Independent States Cup: 2014

Individual

- Desna Chernihiv Player of the Year of season 2020–21
