= Serhiy Bolbat =

Ukrainian footballer

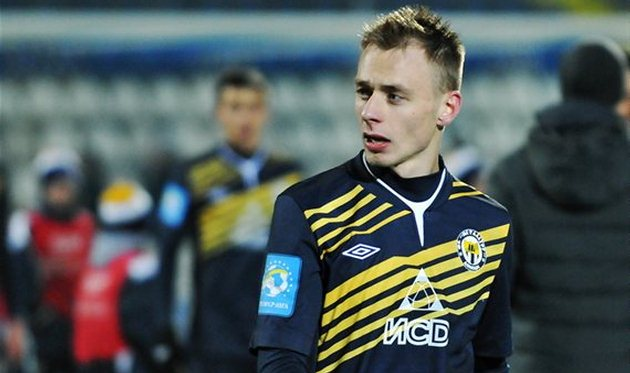

Personal information
- Full name: Serhiy Serhiyovych Bolbat
- Date of birth: 13 June 1993 (age 33)
- Place of birth: Volnovakha, Ukraine
- Height: 1.75 m (5 ft 9 in)
- Position: Midfielder

Youth career
- 2006–2008: Shakhtar Donetsk
- 2009–2010: Olimpik Donetsk

Senior career*
Years	Team	Apps	(Gls)
2011–2022	Shakhtar Donetsk	44	(3)
2011–2013	→ Shakhtar-3 Donetsk	65	(19)
2013–2014	→ Metalurh Donetsk (loan)	19	(2)
2014–2015	→ Metalist Kharkiv (loan)	17	(4)
2015–2017	→ Lokeren (loan)	44	(6)
2017–2018	→ Mariupol (loan)	26	(5)
2021	→ Desna Chernihiv (loan)	13	(0)
2022–2024	Kolos Kovalivka	43	(1)

International career^{‡}
2013–2014	Ukraine U21	13	(2)
2014–2019	Ukraine	5	(0)
- * Club domestic league appearances and goals as of 10 December 2023 ‡ National team caps and goals as of 14 November 2019

Serhiy Serhiyovych Bolbat (Ukrainian: Сергій Сергійович Болбат; born 13 June 1993) is a Ukrainian professional footballer who plays as a midfielder.

== Career ==
Bolbat is the product of the youth systems of Shakhtar Donetsk. He was called up for the Ukrainian Youth Football team.

=== Lokeren ===
For the 2015–16 Belgian Pro League season, he signed for Lokeren.

=== Loan to Mariupol ===
In summer 2017 he moved on loan to FC Mariupol in Ukrainian Premier League, where he played 26 matches and scored 5 goals.

=== Shakhtar Donetsk ===
He won the 2018–19 Ukrainian Premier League and 2019–20 Ukrainian Premier League with Shakhtar Donetsk, as the 2018–19 Ukrainian Cup.

=== Loan to Desna Chernihiv ===
In August 2021 he moved on loan to Desna Chernihiv in the Ukrainian Premier League. On 22 August he made his league debut against Dynamo Kyiv at the Valeriy Lobanovskyi Dynamo Stadium, replacing Levan Arveladze in the 46th minute.

=== Kolos Kovalivka ===
On 1 July 2022 he moved to Kolos Kovalivka. Bolbat left Kolos on 23 February 2024 by mutual consent.

== International career ==
In 2014 he made his senior debut for Ukraine, earning additional caps in 2018 and 2019.

== Career statistics ==
=== Club ===
As of 1 December 2022

Club	Season	League			Cup (Note: Includes Ukrainian Cup)		Continental		Other		Total	
Club	Season	Division	Apps	Goals	Apps	Goals	Apps	Goals	Apps	Goals	Apps	Goals
Shakhtar-3 Donetsk	2010–11	Ukrainian Second League	7	0	0	0	0	0	0	0	7	0
Shakhtar-3 Donetsk	2011–12	Ukrainian Second League	25	7	0	0	0	0	0	0	25	7
Shakhtar-3 Donetsk	2012–13	Ukrainian Second League	33	12	0	0	0	0	0	0	33	12
Shakhtar-3 Donetsk	Total		65	19	0	0	0	0	0	0	65	19
Shakhtar Donetsk	2014–15	Ukrainian Premier League	1	0	0	0	0	0	1 (Note: Appearance in Ukrainian Super Cup)	0	2	0
Shakhtar Donetsk	2018–19	Ukrainian Premier League	20	3	3	0	6 (Note: Four appearances in UEFA Champions League, two in UEFA Europa League)	0	1	0	30	3
Shakhtar Donetsk	2019–20	Ukrainian Premier League	17	0	1	0	4 (Note: Three appearances in UEFA Champions League, one in UEFA Europa League)	0	1	0	23	0
Shakhtar Donetsk	2020–21	Ukrainian Premier League	6	0	1	0	1 (Note: Appearance(s) in UEFA Europa League)	0	0	0	8	0
Shakhtar Donetsk	Total		44	3	5	0	11	0	3	0	63	3
Metalurh Donetsk (loan)	2013–14	Ukrainian Premier League	19	2	1	1	0	0	0	0	20	3
Metalist Kharkiv (loan)	2014–15	Ukrainian Premier League	17	4	2	0	5	0	0	0	24	4
Lokeren (loan)	2015–16	Belgian First Division A	23	3	1	0	0	0	0	0	24	3
Lokeren (loan)	2016–17	Belgian First Division A	21	3	2	0	0	0	0	0	23	3
Mariupol (loan)	2017–18	Ukrainian Premier League	26	5	1	0	0	0	0	0	27	5
Desna Chernihiv (loan)	2021–22	Ukrainian Premier League	13	0	1	0	0	0	0	0	14	0
Kolos Kovalivka	2022–23	Ukrainian Premier League	14	1	0	0	0	0	0	0	14	1
Career total			242	40	13	1	16	0	3	0	274	41

=== International ===
As of 19 November 2019

Ukraine
Year	Apps	Goals
2014	1	0
2015	0	0
2016	0	0
2017	0	0
2018	1	0
2019	3	0
Total	5	0

== Honours ==
Shakhtar Donetsk

- Ukrainian Premier League

Winner (2): 2018–19, 2019–20

- Ukrainian Cup

Winner (1): 2018–19

- Ukrainian Super Cup

Winner (1): 2014

== Gallery ==
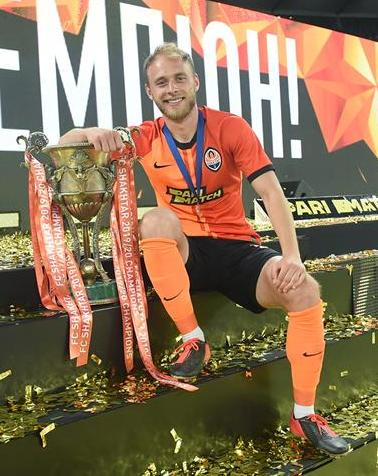

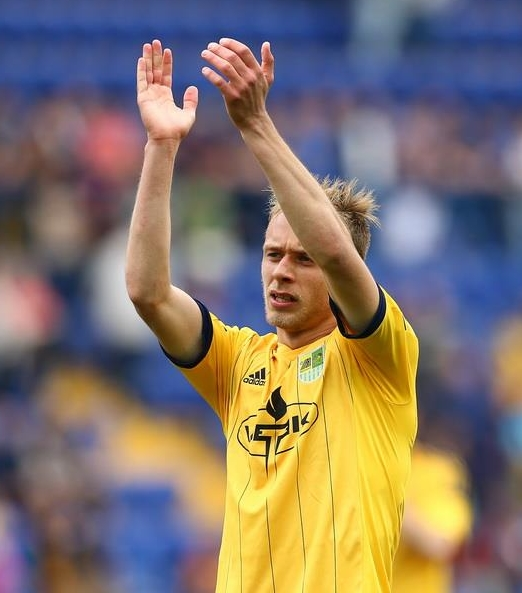

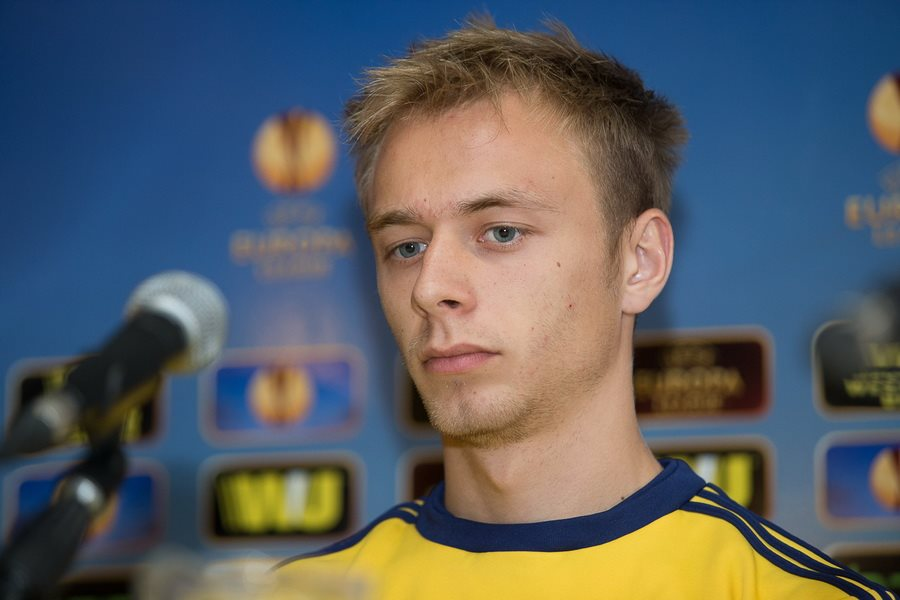
