= Yevheniy Bilokin =

Ukrainian footballer (born 1998)

Personal information
- Full name: Yevheniy Yuriyovych Bilokin
- Date of birth: 16 June 1998 (age 28)
- Place of birth: Poltava, Ukraine
- Height: 1.82 m (6 ft 0 in)
- Position: Midfielder

Team information
- Current team: Prochowiczanka Prochowice
- Number: 10

Youth career
- –2012: Dnipro Dnipropetrovsk
- 2013: I. Horpynka DYuSSh
- 2014–2016: Mariupol

Senior career*
Years	Team	Apps	(Gls)
2016–2019	Mariupol	6	(0)
2016–2017	→ Illichivets-2 Mariupol	25	(5)
2019	Metalist 1925 Kharkiv	3	(0)
2020–2022	Tavriya Simferopol	30	(4)
2022	Lubiatowianka Lubiatów	11	(13)
2022–2023	Prochowiczanka Prochowice	15	(6)
2023	→ Górnik Polkowice (loan)	13	(0)
2023–2024	Górnik Polkowice	32	(2)
2024–	Prochowiczanka Prochowice	61	(27)
- * Club domestic league appearances and goals as of 21:50, 30 June 2026 (UTC)

Yevheniy Yuriyovych Bilokin (Ukrainian: Євгеній Юрійович Білокінь; born 16 June 1998) is a Ukrainian professional footballer who plays as a midfielder for Polish club Prochowiczanka Prochowice.

== Club career ==
He made his Ukrainian Second League debut for FC Illichivets-2 Mariupol on 24 July 2016 in a game against FC Rukh Vynnyky.

== Honours ==
Górnik Polkowice

- Polish Cup (Legnica regionals): 2023–24
