= Vladyslav Buhay =

Ukrainian footballer

Personal information
- Full name: Vladyslav Serhiyovych Buhay
- Date of birth: 27 October 1997 (age 29)
- Place of birth: Kyiv, Ukraine
- Height: 1.85 m (6 ft 1 in)
- Position: Striker

Team information
- Current team: Nyva Ternopil

Youth career
- 2004–2012: Dynamo Kyiv
- 2012–2013: Atlet Kyiv
- 2013: Illichivets Mariupol
- 2013–2014: Atlet Kyiv
- 2015: Lokomotyv Kyiv

Senior career*
Years	Team	Apps	(Gls)
2015–2019	Shakhtar Donetsk	0	(0)
2016–2017	→ Bukovyna Chernivtsi (loan)	23	(1)
2017–2019	→ Mariupol (loan)	4	(0)
2019–2020	Mariupol	0	(0)
2019–2020	→ Mykolaiv (loan)	17	(5)
2020–2021	Chornomorets Odesa	36	(5)
2022–2023	Lviv	29	(4)
2023–2025	Zorya Luhansk	15	(1)
2024–2025	→ Metalist 1925 Kharkiv (loan)	16	(1)
2026	Stal Kraśnik	11	(3)
2026–	Nyva Ternopil	0	(0)

International career
2013	Ukraine U17	1	(0)
- * Club domestic league appearances and goals as of 22:18, 3 June 2026 (UTC)

Vladyslav Serhiyovych Buhay (Ukrainian: Владислав Сергійович Бугай; born 27 October 1997) is a Ukrainian professional footballer who plays as a striker for Ukrainian First League club Nyva Ternopil.

== Career ==
Buhay is a product of different Kyivan youth football school systems, where his first trainer was Viktor Kashchey. In 2015, he transferred to Shakhtar Donetsk.

In August 2016, he went on a one-year loan to Ukrainian First League club Bukovyna Chernivtsi.

On 6 September 2024, Buhay moved to Metalist 1925 Kharkiv on a season-long loan.
