= Roger Gomis =

Senegalese footballer (born 1994)

Personal information
- Full name: Roger Gomis
- Date of birth: 5 September 1994 (age 32)
- Place of birth: Niaguis, Ziguinchor Region, Senegal
- Height: 1.68 m (5 ft 6 in)
- Position: Midfielder

Team information
- Current team: AS Douanes

Youth career
- ASC Yeggo

Senior career*
Years	Team	Apps	(Gls)
2011	ASC Yeggo		
2011–2014	Gorée		
2014–2015	Louhans-Cuiseaux	7	(0)
2017–2018	Mariupol	8	(0)
2019	Gorée	0	(0)
2019	CA Bizertin		
2020–2021	Teungueth		
2021–	AS Douanes		

International career
2012	Senegal U17	3	(0)
2015	Senegal U20	6	(0)
- * Club domestic league appearances and goals as of 31 May 2018

Roger Gomis (born 5 September 1994) is a Senegalese football midfielder who plays for AS Douanes.

== Football career ==
Born in Ziguinchor, Gomis played for Senegalese football teams, and arrived in France at the age of 20 as he signed for CS Louhans-Cuiseaux in the Championnat de France Amateur 2.

In March 2017, he signed contract with the Ukrainian FC Illichivets Mariupol.

In February 2020, Gomis returned to Senegal. He officially joined Teungueth FC on 11 March 2020. In May 2021, Gomis joined AS Douanes.
