= Yevhen Neplyakh =

Ukrainian footballer (born 1992)

Personal information
- Full name: Yevhen Serhiyovych Neplyakh
- Date of birth: 11 May 1992 (age 34)
- Place of birth: Dnipropetrovsk, Ukraine
- Height: 1.81 m (5 ft 11 1/2 in)
- Position: Left back

Team information
- Current team: Alians Lypova Dolyna
- Number: 4

Youth career
- 2005–2007: UFK Dnipropetrovsk
- 2007–2009: Dnipro Dnipropetrovsk

Senior career*
Years	Team	Apps	(Gls)
2009–2012	Dnipro Dnipropetrovsk	0	(0)
2012–2014	Sevastopol	32	(0)
2012	→ Sevastopol-2 (loan)	1	(0)
2014–2015	Platanias	8	(0)
2016	Karpaty Lviv	1	(0)
2016	Veres Rivne	11	(1)
2017–2018	Mariupol	26	(0)
2018–2019	Volyn Lutsk	28	(0)
2020	Olimpik Donetsk	1	(0)
2020–	Alians Lypova Dolyna	21	(0)

International career^{‡}
2010	Ukraine U18	2	(0)
2013–2014	Ukraine U21	9	(0)
- * Club domestic league appearances and goals as of 27 June 2021 ‡ National team caps and goals as of 17 August 2020

Yevhen Neplyakh (Ukrainian: Євген Сергійович Неплях, born 11 May 1992) is a Ukrainian football defender who plays for Alians Lypova Dolyna.

== Career ==
Neplaykh was the member of Ukrainian national under-18 football team. In March 2013 he was called up for Ukrainian national under-21 football team by coach Serhiy Kovalets.
