= Yevheniy Aranovskyi =

Ukrainian football referee (born 1976)

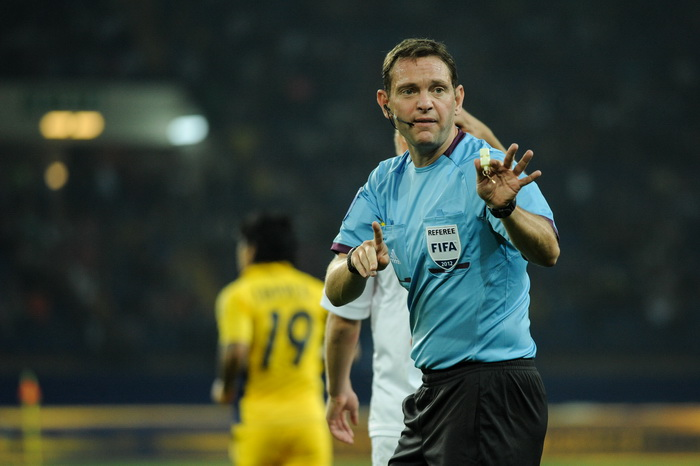
- Full name: Yevheniy Anatoliyovych Aranovskyi
- Born: 13 October 1976 (age 50); Kyiv, Ukrainian SSR, Soviet Union

Domestic
Years	League	Role

International
Years	League	Role
2011–	FIFA listed	Referee

Yevheniy Anatoliyovych Aranovskyi (Ukrainian: Євгеній Анатолійович Арановський; born 13 October 1976) is a Ukrainian professional football referee. He has been a full international for FIFA since 2011.
