= Vyacheslav Churko =

Ukrainian footballer

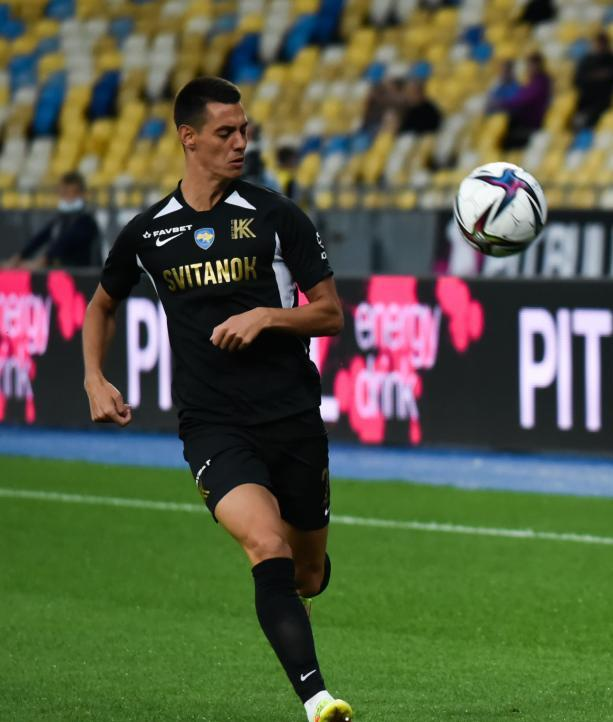

Personal information
- Full name: Vyacheslav Vyacheslavovych Churko
- Date of birth: 10 May 1993 (age 33)
- Place of birth: Uzhhorod, Ukraine
- Height: 1.80 m (5 ft 11 in)
- Position: Right winger

Team information
- Current team: Metalist 1925 Kharkiv
- Number: 11

Youth career
- 2005–2007: SSSOR Uzhhorod (Note: Specialized Sports School of Olympic Reserve Uzhhorod)
- 2007–2009: Shakhtar Donetsk

Senior career*
Years	Team	Apps	(Gls)
2009–2021	Shakhtar Donetsk	0	(0)
2009	→ Shakhtar-3 Donetsk	1	(0)
2012–2013	→ Hoverla Uzhhorod (loan)	11	(0)
2013–2015	→ Illichivets Mariupol (loan)	32	(8)
2015	→ Metalist Kharkiv (loan)	14	(1)
2016	→ Puskás Akadémia (loan)	12	(3)
2016–2017	→ Frosinone (loan)	11	(0)
2017–2020	→ Mariupol (loan)	73	(10)
2021	→ Kolos Kovalivka (loan)	11	(3)
2021–2022	Kolos Kovalivka	16	(1)
2022	→ Mezőkövesd (loan)	7	(0)
2022–2024	Zorya Luhansk	34	(2)
2024–	Metalist 1925 Kharkiv	37	(2)

International career^{‡}
2009	Ukraine U16	9	(1)
2009–2010	Ukraine U17	7	(1)
2010	Ukraine U18	2	(0)
2011–2012	Ukraine U19	19	(5)
2012	Ukraine U20	3	(0)
2013–2014	Ukraine U21	12	(2)
- * Club domestic league appearances and goals as of 3 June 2026 ‡ National team caps and goals as of 10 February 2021

Vyacheslav Vyacheslavovych Churko (Ukrainian: В'ячеслав В'ячеславович Чурко, Hungarian: Csurko Vjacseszlav, born 10 May 1993) is a Ukrainian professional footballer who plays as a right winger who plays for Metalist 1925 Kharkiv.

== Career ==
Churko was the member of Ukrainian national youth football teams of different ages. From August 2012, he has been playing on loan for Hoverla Uzhhorod. This is based on a loan contract that has been extended for another half-year in December 2012.

=== Mezőkövesd ===
On 6 April 2022, Churko joined Mezőkövesd in Hungary on loan until the end of the season.

=== Metalist 1925 Kharkiv ===
On 3 July 2024, Churko signed a two-year contract with Metalist 1925 Kharkiv.

== Personal life ==
He is of Hungarian descent and holds a Hungarian passport.

== Honours ==
Puskás Akadémia

- Nemzeti Bajnokság II: 2016–17
