= Ihor Tyshchenko =

Ukrainian footballer

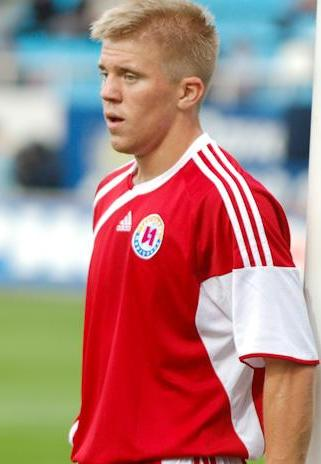

Personal information
- Full name: Ihor Serhiyovych Tyshchenko
- Date of birth: 11 May 1989 (age 37)
- Place of birth: Vladivostok, Soviet Union
- Height: 1.80 m (5 ft 11 in)
- Position: Right-back

Team information
- Current team: TuS Schwarz-Weiß Bismark
- Number: 21

Youth career
- 2001–2006: lllichivets Mariupol

Senior career*
| Years | Team | Apps | (Gls) |
| 2006–2012 | lllichivets Mariupol | 82 | (12) |
| 2006–2007 | → lllichivets-2 Mariupol | 38 | (2) |
| 2008 | → Feniks-Illichovets Kalinine (loan) | 17 | (0) |
| 2013–2014 | Karpaty Lviv | 6 | (0) |
| 2014 | → Arka Gdynia (loan) | 2 | (0) |
| 2014 | → Arka Gdynia II (loan) | 2 | (1) |
| 2014–2015 | Olimpik Donetsk | 24 | (2) |
| 2016 | Śląsk Wrocław | 2 | (0) |
| 2016 | Śląsk Wrocław II | 7 | (0) |
| 2016–2021 | Mariupol | 92 | (4) |
| 2021–2022 | Yarud Mariupol | 12 | (2) |
| 2023– | TuS Schwarz-Weiß Bismark | | |
- * Club domestic league appearances and goals as of 10 May 2024

Ihor Serhiyovych Tyshchenko (Ukrainian: Ігор Сергійович Тищенко; born 11 May 1989) is a Ukrainian footballer who plays as a right-back for German club TuS Schwarz-Weiß Bismark.

== Career ==
=== Early years ===
Born in Vladivostok, Russia, he has lived in Mariupol, Ukraine, since he was five.

=== Śląsk Wrocław ===
On 25 February 2016, he signed a half-year contract with Polish team Śląsk Wrocław.
