= Ruslan Kisil =

Ukrainian footballer

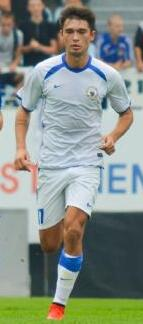

Personal information
- Full name: Ruslan Serhiyovych Kisil
- Date of birth: 23 October 1991 (age 35)
- Place of birth: Novodonetske, Ukraine
- Height: 1.85 m (6 ft 1 in)
- Position: Midfielder

Team information
- Current team: Sliema Wanderers
- Number: 23

Youth career
- 2004–2005: Olimpik Donetsk
- 2005–2008: Shakhtar Donetsk

Senior career*
Years	Team	Apps	(Gls)
2008–2012	Shakhtar Donetsk	0	(0)
2008–2010	→ Shakhtar-3 Donetsk	47	(7)
2012–2014	Illichivets Mariupol	10	(0)
2014–2015	Desna Chernihiv	27	(3)
2016–2017	Mariupol	48	(19)
2018	Olimpik Donetsk	12	(1)
2018	Desna Chernihiv	1	(0)
2018	Kolos Kovalivka	6	(0)
2019-2020	Baltika Kaliningrad	9	(0)
2020–	Sliema Wanderers	15	(0)
- * Club domestic league appearances and goals as of 23 November 2019

Ruslan Serhiyovych Kisil (Ukrainian: Руслан Сергійович Кісіль; born 23 October 1991) is a Ukrainian professional footballer who plays for Sliema Wanderers as a midfielder.

== Career ==
Kisil was born in the Donetsk Oblast and went to the youth academy of his local club FC Olimpik Donetsk and then on to Shakhtar Donetsk. Upon completion of the school, Kisil was promoted first to Shakhtar-3 Donetsk of the Ukrainian Second League, followed by the Shakhtar reserves, where he would spend two seasons. And in summer of 2012 he signed a contract with FC Illichivets.
