= Andriy Korobenko =

Ukrainian footballer (born 1997)

Personal information
- Full name: Andriy Vyacheslavovych Korobenko
- Date of birth: 28 May 1997 (age 29)
- Place of birth: Chernihiv, Ukraine
- Height: 1.84 m (6 ft 1/2 in)
- Position: Midfielder

Team information
- Current team: Liepāja
- Number: 28

Youth career
- 2010–2014: Shakhtar Donetsk

Senior career*
Years	Team	Apps	(Gls)
2014–2019	Shakhtar Donetsk	1	(0)
2016	→ Chornomorets Odesa (loan)	0	(0)
2017–2019	→ Mariupol (loan)	2	(0)
2019–2020	Rukh Lviv	11	(1)
2021–2023	Inhulets Petrove	34	(0)
2023–2024	Valmiera	43	(0)
2025–	Liepāja	61	(2)

International career^{‡}
2015–2016	Ukraine U19	8	(0)
2016	Ukraine U20	2	(0)
- * Club domestic league appearances and goals as of 12 November 2026 ‡ National team caps and goals as of 29 October 2019

Andriy Korobenko (Ukrainian: Андрій В'ячеславович Коробенко; born 28 May 1997) is a Ukrainian footballer who plays as a midfielder for Latvian club Liepāja.

== Career ==
He is a product of the FC Shakhtar Donetsk Youth Sportive Academy.

Korobenko made his debut for FC Shakhtar in the match against FC Volyn Lutsk on 21 November 2015 in the Ukrainian Premier League. On 13 November 2020, there were rumors that Desna Chernihiv was interested.

On 15 January 2025, Korobenko signed with Liepāja.
