= Vitaliy Koltsov =

Ukrainian footballer (born 1994)

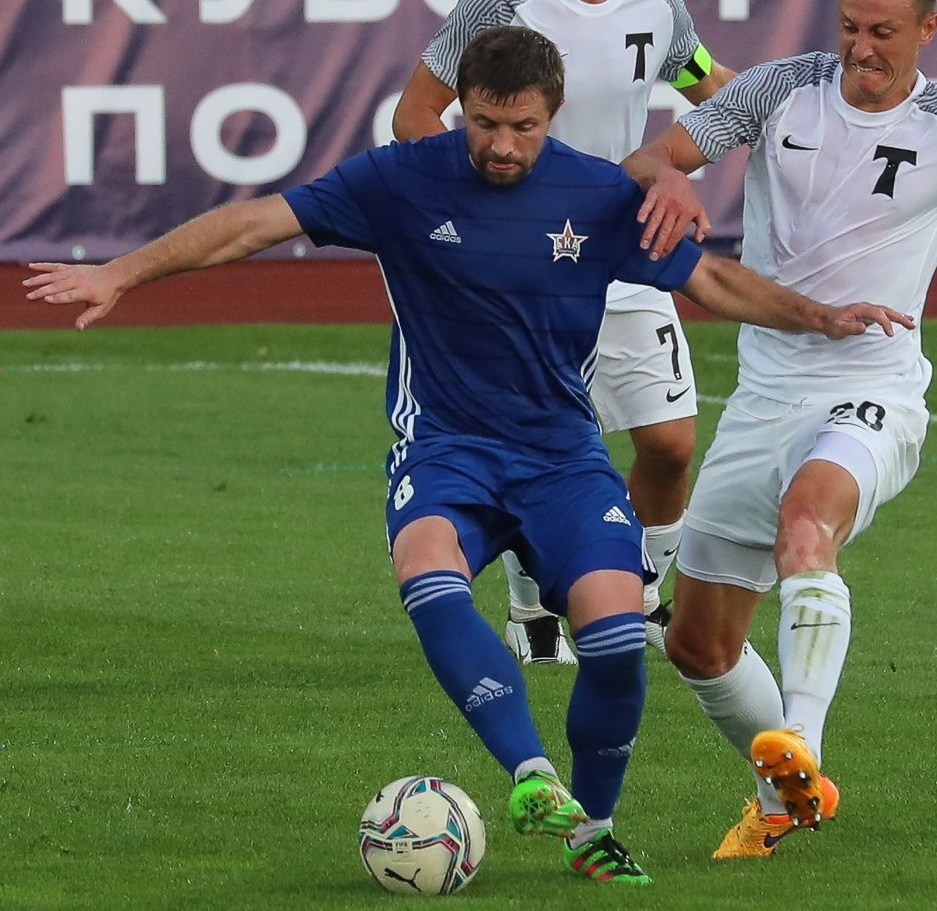
- Koltsov with SKA-Khabarovsk in 2021

Personal information
- Full name: Vitaliy Valeriyovych Koltsov
- Date of birth: 20 March 1994 (age 32)
- Place of birth: Moivka, Vinnytsia Oblast, Ukraine
- Height: 1.74 m (5 ft 9 in)
- Position: Midfielder

Youth career
- 2006–2010: Nyva Vinnytsia
- 2010–2011: Shakhtar Donetsk

Senior career*
Years	Team	Apps	(Gls)
2011–2017	Shakhtar Donetsk	0	(0)
2013–2015	→ Shakhtar-3 Donetsk	54	(2)
2015–2017	→ Illichivets Mariupol (loan)	55	(3)
2017–2018	Mariupol	10	(1)
2018	Oleksandriya	2	(0)
2018–2019	Olimpik Donetsk	21	(1)
2019–2021	Metalist 1925 Kharkiv	56	(4)
2021	SKA-Khabarovsk	24	(0)
2022–2023	Nyva Vinnytsia	17	(3)
2023–2024	Inhulets Petrove	28	(10)
2024–2026	Bukovyna Chernivtsi	29	(6)
2026	→ Bukovyna-2 Chernivtsi	1	(0)

International career^{‡}
2011	Ukraine U17	1	(0)
2012	Ukraine U18	5	(0)
- * Club domestic league appearances and goals as of 3 June 2026 ‡ National team caps and goals as of 10 July 2018

Vitaliy Valeriyovych Koltsov (Ukrainian: Віталій Валерійович Кольцов; born 20 March 1994) is a Ukrainian professional footballer who plays as a midfielder.

== Career ==
Koltsov is a product of the Nyva Vinnytsia and Shakhtar Donetsk academies.

From July 2015 to June 2017, he went on loan for the Ukrainian First League club FC Illichivets Mariupol.
