= 2020–21 FC Olimpik Donetsk season =

Olimpik Donetsk
2020–21 season
- President: Vladyslav Helzin
- Manager: Ihor Klymovskyi (until 25 February 2021); Yuriy Kalitvintsev (since 25 February 2021)
- Stadium: Dynamo Stadium, Kyiv
- Ukrainian Premier League: 13th
- Ukrainian Cup: Third preliminary round
- Top goalscorer: League: Shahab Zahedi (8); All: Shahab Zahedi (8)
- Highest home attendance: 1,000 (vs Shakhtar Donetsk, 6 March 2021)
- Lowest home attendance: 0
- Average home league attendance: 76
Home colours	Away colours

The 2020–21 season was the seventh consecutive season in the top Ukrainian football league for Olimpik Donetsk. Olimpik competed in Premier League and Ukrainian Cup.

== Players ==
=== Squad information ===
As of 30 June 2021

Squad no.	Name	Nationality	Position	Date of birth (age)
Goalkeepers
1	Artem Kychak	(Ukraine)	GK	16 May 1989 (aged 32)
12	Betim Halimi	(Kosovo) (Albania)	GK	28 February 1996 (aged 25)
35	Andrii Chekotun ^{List B}	(Ukraine)	GK	2 September 2002 (aged 18)
Defenders
2	Bohdan Veklyak	(Ukraine)	DF	31 August 1999 (aged 21)
6	Issiar Dramé	(France) (Mali)	DF	16 February 1999 (aged 22)
13	Ivan Zotko	(Ukraine)	DF	9 July 1996 (aged 24)
74	Ihor Snurnitsyn ^{List B}	(Ukraine)	DF	7 March 2000 (aged 21)
54	Orest Lebedenko (on loan from CD Lugo)	(Ukraine)	DF	23 September 1998 (aged 22)
Midfielders
4	Yevhen Tsymbalyuk	(Ukraine)	MF	19 June 1996 (aged 25)
7	Temur Chogadze	(Georgia (country))	MF	5 May 1998 (aged 23)
9	Taras Zaviyskyi	(Ukraine)	MF	12 April 1995 (aged 26)
11	Vladyslav Khamelyuk	(Ukraine)	MF	4 May 1998 (aged 23)
14	Daniel Romanovskij	(Lithuania)	MF	19 June 1996 (aged 25)
18	Fabricio Alvarenga	(Argentina)	MF	17 January 1996 (aged 25)
19	Maxime Do Couto	(France) (Portugal)	MF	13 December 1996 (aged 24)
20	Ruslan Babenko	(Ukraine)	MF	8 July 1992 (aged 28)
22	Olabiran Muyiwa (on loan from Dynamo Kyiv)	(Nigeria) (Ivory Coast)	MF	7 September 1998 (aged 22)
30	Talles	(Brazil)	MF	12 May 1998 (aged 23)
42	Yevhen Pasich	(Ukraine)	MF	13 July 1993 (aged 27)
55	Geo Danny Ekra ^{List B}	(Ivory Coast)	MF	10 January 1999 (aged 22)
89	Serhiy Politylo	(Ukraine)	MF	29 January 1989 (aged 32)
Forwards
17	Taddeus Nkeng	(Cameroon)	FW	26 February 2000 (aged 21)
33	Ibrahim Kargbo Jr. (on loan from Dynamo Kyiv)	(Belgium) (Sierra Leone)	FW	3 January 2000 (aged 21)

== Transfers ==
=== In ===
Date	Pos.	Player	Age	Moving from	Type	Fee	Source
Summer
1 August 2020	FW	(Belarus) Kirill Kirilenko	22	(Ukraine) Karpaty Lviv	Transfer	Free	
17 August 2020	FW	(Ukraine) Yevhen Neplyakh	28	Unattached	Transfer	Free	
29 August 2020	MF	(Argentina) Fabricio Alvarenga	24	(Argentina) Vélez Sarsfield	Transfer	Undisclosed	
2 September 2020	MF	(Ukraine) Ruslan Babenko	28	(Poland) Raków Częstochowa	Transfer	Undisclosed	
10 September 2020	DF	(Ukraine) Rizvan Ablitarov	31	(Kazakhstan) Kaisar	Transfer	Undisclosed	
31 July 2020	MF	(Azerbaijan) Arziman Rizvanov	20	(Ukraine) Avanhard Kramatorsk	Loan return		
29 August 2020	MF	(Nigeria) Olabiran Muyiwa	21	(Ukraine) Dynamo Kyiv	Loan		
29 August 2020	FW	(Belgium) Ibrahim Kargbo Jr.	20	(Ukraine) Dynamo Kyiv	Loan		
Summer
11 January 2021	DF	(Ukraine) Bohdan Veklyak	21	(Ukraine) Hirnyk-Sport Horishni Plavnii	Transfer	Free	
11 January 2021	MF	(Ukraine) Vladyslav Khamelyuk	22	(Ukraine) Chornomorets Odesa	Transfer	Undisclosed	
23 January 2021	FW	(Cameroon) Taddeus Nkeng	20	Unattached	Transfer	Free	
5 February 2021	MF	(Brazil) Talles	22	(Brazil) Vila Nova	Transfer	Undisclosed	
31 March 2021	MF	(Ivory Coast) Geo Danny Ekra	22	Unattached	Transfer	Free	
31 December 2020	FW	(Nigeria) Geoffrey Chinedu	24	(Estonia) Narva Trans	Loan return		

=== Out ===
Date	Pos.	Player	Age	Moving to	Type	Fee	Source
Summer
4 August 2020	MF	(Ukraine) Vitaliy Balashov	29	(Russia) FC Tambov	Transfer	Free	
12 August 2020	FW	(Ukraine) Maksym Dehtyarov	27	(Ukraine) Desna Chernihiv	Transfer	Free	
26 August 2020	DF	(Ukraine) Dmytro Lytvyn	23	Unattached	Transfer	Free	
27 August 2020	MF	(Ukraine) Vitaliy Hoshkoderya	32	(Ukraine) Metalist 1925 Kharkiv	Transfer	Undisclosed	
28 August 2020	MF	(North Macedonia) Demir Imeri	24	(Albania) Vllaznia Shkodër	Transfer	Undisclosed	
3 September 2020	GK	(Ukraine) Volodymyr Krynskyi	23	(Ukraine) Inhulets Petrove	Transfer	Free	
3 September 2020	FW	(Senegal) Matar Dieye	22	(Croatia) HNK Gorica	Transfer	Free	
14 September 2020	FW	(Ukraine) Denys Balanyuk	23	Unattached	Transfer	Free	
25 September 2020	MF	(Ukraine) Nazar Verbnyi	23	(Ukraine) Karpaty Halych	Transfer	Free	
7 October 2020	DF	(Ukraine) Yevhen Neplyakh	28	Unattached	Transfer	Free	
27 October 2020	DF	(Ukraine) Pavlo Lukyanchuk	24	(Ukraine) Obolon Kyiv	Transfer	Free	
31 July 2020	FW	(Ukraine) Mykyta Kravchenko	23	(Ukraine) Dynamo Kyiv	Loan return		
Summer
31 December 2020	DF	(Ukraine) Rizvan Ablitarov	31	Unattached	Transfer	Free	
31 December 2020	DF	(Ukraine) Dmytro Hryshko	35	Retired	Transfer	Free	
31 December 2020	MF	(Ukraine) Andriy Kravchuk	21	Unattached	Transfer	Free	
8 February 2021	MF	(Ukraine) Pavlo Ksyonz	34	(Ukraine) VPK-Ahro Shevchenkivka	Transfer	Free	
8 February 2021	FW	(Iran) Shahab Zahedi	25	(Ukraine) Zorya Luhansk	Transfer	EUR 300th	
14 February 2021	MF	(Belarus) Kirill Kirilenko	21	(Belarus) Torpedo-BelAZ Zhodino	Transfer	Free	
24 February 2021	FW	(Nigeria) Geoffrey Chinedu	24	(Finland) FC Lahti	Loan		

== Pre-season and friendlies ==
1 August 2020 Friendly	Olimpik Donetsk (Ukraine)	3–2	(Ukraine) Polissya Zhytomyr	Shchaslyve
17:00 EEST (UTC+03:00)	15' (o.g.); Savoshko 79'	Report	Zotko 25'; Zahedi 53', 85'

5 August 2020 Friendly	Olimpik Donetsk (Ukraine)	5–0	(Ukraine) Chaika Petropavlivska Borshchahivka	Shchaslyve
17:00 EEST (UTC+03:00)	28'; Zaviyskyi 34'; Zahedi 79', 87'; Do Couto 90'	Report

6 August 2020 Friendly	Olimpik Donetsk (Ukraine)	2–2	(Ukraine) Dinaz Vyshhorod	Shchaslyve
17:00 EEST (UTC+03:00)	30'	Report	Zahedi 58'; 80'

9 August 2020 Friendly	Olimpik Donetsk (Ukraine)	2–1	(Ukraine) Rubikon Kyiv	Shchaslyve
11:00 EEST (UTC+03:00)	Zahedi 6'; 60'	Report	Zaviyskyi 16' (o.g.)

14 August 2020 Friendly	Desna Chernihiv (Ukraine)	2–0	(Ukraine) Olimpik Donetsk	Bucha
17:00 EEST (UTC+03:00)	Mudryk 40'; Budkivskyi 90'	Report		Stadium: Yuvileynyi Stadium

29 August 2020 Friendly	Kolos Kovalivka (Ukraine)	3–1	(Ukraine) Olimpik Donetsk	Kovalivka
18:00 EEST (UTC+03:00)	Seleznyov 50'; Novak 55'; Antyukh 79'	Report	Kirilenko 74'	Stadium: Kolos training facility

30 August 2020 Friendly	Ukraine U-21	5–1	(Ukraine) Olimpik Donetsk	Kyiv
18:00 EEST (UTC+03:00)	Nazarenko 18'; Topalov 50'; Lunyov 67', 71'; Babohlo 83'	Report	Chogadze 59'	Stadium: Bannikov Stadium

5 September 2020 Friendly	Shakhtar Donetsk (Ukraine)	1–2	(Ukraine) Olimpik Donetsk	Kyiv
11:00 EEST (UTC+03:00)	Fernando 83'	Report	Zahedi 12'; Zaviyskyi 39'	Stadium: Bannikov Stadium

19 January 2021 Friendly	Olimpik Donetsk (Ukraine)	2–2	(Poland) Śląsk Wrocław	Lara, Turkey
17:30 EET (UTC+02:00)	Politylo 49'; Zaviyskyi 75'	Report	Scalet 38'; Pawłowski 70'	Stadium: Titanic

23 January 2021 Friendly	TSC Bačka Topola (Serbia)	2–3	(Ukraine) Olimpik Donetsk	Belek, Turkey
15:00 EET (UTC+02:00)	Duronjić 3'; Tumbasević 77'	Report	Do Couto 36'; Chogadze 38'; Benito 79'	Stadium: Papilon

24 January 2021 Friendly	Olimpik Donetsk (Ukraine)	3–0	(Serbia) Spartak Subotica	Antalya, Turkey
16:30 EET (UTC+02:00)	Kargbo 45'; Nkeng 46', 48'	Report		Stadium: Titanic

29 January 2021 Friendly	Olimpik Donetsk (Ukraine)	1–1	(Ukraine) FC Mynai	Antalya, Turkey
16:30 EET (UTC+02:00)	Chogadze 4'	Report	Oduenyi 29'	Stadium: Titanic

30 January 2021 Friendly	Budućnost Podgorica (Montenegro)	1–0	(Ukraine) Olimpik Donetsk	Antalya, Turkey
15:30 EET (UTC+02:00)	Božović 27' (pen.)	Report		Stadium: Sport-Center

4 February 2021 Friendly	Rukh Lviv (Ukraine)	0–1	(Ukraine) Olimpik Donetsk	Antalya, Turkey
15:00 EET (UTC+02:00)		Report	Kargbo 39'	Stadium: Titanic

5 February 2021 Friendly	Arda Kardzhali (Bulgaria)	2–2	(Ukraine) Olimpik Donetsk	Antalya, Turkey
10:30 EET (UTC+02:00)	81'; 90'	Report	Nkeng 32'; Zaviyskyi 85'	Stadium: Eurensky Stadium

== Competitions ==
=== Overall ===
Competition	First match	Last match	Starting round	Final position	Record							
Competition	First match	Last match	Starting round	Final position	Pld	W	D	L	GF	GA	GD	Win %
Premier League	21 August 2020	9 May 2021	Matchday 1	13th	26	6	4	16	28	48	−20	23.08
Cup	13 November 2020	13 November 2020	Round of 32 (1/16)	Round of 32 (1/16)	1	0	0	1	0	1	−1	0.00
Total					27	6	4	17	28	49	−21	22.22

Last updated: 9 May 2021
Source: Competitions

=== Premier League ===
==== League table ====
Pos	Team	Pld	W	D	L	GF	GA	GD	Pts	Qualification or relegation
10	Rukh Lviv	26	6	10	10	27	39	−12	28	
11	FC Mariupol	26	6	8	12	27	41	−14	26 (Note: Head-to-head points: Mariupol 4, Inhulets 1)	
12	Inhulets Petrove	26	5	11	10	24	39	−15	26	
13	Olimpik Donetsk (R)	26	6	4	16	28	48	−20	22	Relegation to Ukrainian First League
14	FC Mynai	26	4	6	16	16	47	−31	18	Readmitted

Source: Ukrainian Premier League
Rules for classification: 1) Points; 2) Head-to-head points; 3) Head-to-head goal difference; 4) Head-to-head higher number of goals scored; 5) Goal difference; 6) Higher number of goals scored; 7) Draw or "Golden match" if two teams tied for title (Article 22, paragraph 3).
(R) Relegated

==== Results summary ====
Overall								Home						Away					
Pld	W	D	L	GF	GA	GD	Pts	W	D	L	GF	GA	GD	W	D	L	GF	GA	GD
26	6	4	16	28	48	−20	22	4	2	7	17	23	−6	2	2	9	11	25	−14

Last updated: 9 May 2021.
Source: Competitive matches

==== Results by round ====
Round	1	2	3	4	5	6	7	8	9	10	11	12	13	14	15	16	17	18	19	20	21	22	23	24	25	26
Ground	H	A	H	A	H	H	H	A	H	H	A	H	H	A	H	A	H	A	A	A	H	A	A	H	A	H
Result	L	W	W	L	W	L	L	W	D	W	L	W	D	L	L	L	L	L	L	L	L	D	L	L	L	D
Position	14	7	4	8	6	6	7	5	6	7	11	7	7	8	8	8	8	9	11	11	11	11	13	13	13	13

Updated to match(es) played on 9 May 2021. Source: Competitive matches
A = Away; H = Home; W = Win; D = Draw; L = Loss

==== Matches ====
21 August 2020 1	Olimpik Donetsk	1–4	Dynamo Kyiv	Kyiv
17:00 EEST (UTC+03:00)	Politylo 23'; Kychak (yellow card) 57'	Report	Buyalskyi 8'; Zaviyskyi 16' (o.g.); Supriaha 56' de Pena (yellow card) 65'; Tsyhankov 87'	Stadium: Dynamo Stadium; Attendance: 0 Referee: Maksym Kozyryatskyi
Note: Match was played behind closed doors due to quarantine in Ukraine during COVID-19 pandemic.

12 September 2020 2	SC Dnipro-1	1–3	Olimpik Donetsk	Dnipro
14:00 EEST (UTC+03:00)	Di Franco (yellow card) 37'; Kohut (red card) 45+1'; Khoblenko 50'	Report	Zahedi (yellow card) 22', (goal) 44'; Do Couto 47'; Politylo 77' (pen.); Benito (yellow card) 90+1'; Babenko (yellow card) 90+2'	Stadium: Dnipro-Arena; Attendance: 0 Referee: Yevhen Aranovskyi
Note: Match was played behind closed doors due to quarantine in Ukraine during COVID-19 pandemic.

20 September 2020 3	Olimpik Donetsk	3–0	FC Mynai	Kyiv
14:00 EEST (UTC+03:00)	Do Couto 29'; Zahedi 60', 66'	Report		Stadium: Dynamo Stadium; Attendance: 0 Referee: Oleksandr Shandor
Note: Match was played behind closed doors due to quarantine in Ukraine during COVID-19 pandemic.

27 September 2020 4	Shakhtar Donetsk	2–0	Olimpik Donetsk	Kyiv
17:00 EEST (UTC+03:00)	Moraes (yellow card) 22', (goal) 66'; Matviyenko (yellow card) 33'; Kovalenko 64'; Marcos Antônio (yellow card) 90+1'	Report	Snurnitsyn (yellow card) 50'; Babenko (yellow card) 67'	Stadium: NSC Olimpiyskiy; Attendance: 0 Referee: Anatoliy Abdula
Note: Match was played behind closed doors due to quarantine in Ukraine during COVID-19 pandemic.

4 October 2020 5	Olimpik Donetsk	3–2	FC Oleksandriya	Kyiv
14:00 EEST (UTC+03:00)	Zahedi 8'; Babohlo 25' (o.g.); Zotko 44' (pen.); Politylo (yellow card) 45+1'; Do Couto (yellow card) 60'; Snurnitsyn (yellow card) 73'	Report	Babohlo (yellow card) 44'; Banada (red card) 45+1'; Sitalo 62'; Hrechyshkin 90+2' (pen.), (yellow card) 90+3'	Stadium: Dynamo Stadium; Attendance: 0 Referee: Maksym Kozyryatskyi
Note: Match was played behind closed doors due to quarantine in Ukraine during COVID-19 pandemic.

18 October 2020 6	Olimpik Donetsk	0–1	Vorskla Poltava	Kyiv
14:00 EEST (UTC+03:00)	Do Couto (yellow card) 45'; Alvarenga (yellow card) 47'	Report	Yakubu (yellow card) 46' (yellow-red card) 90+2'; Kulach 70'; Riznyk (yellow card) 90+3'	Stadium: Dynamo Stadium; Attendance: 0 Referee: Volodymyr Novokhatniy
Note: Match was played behind closed doors due to quarantine in Ukraine during COVID-19 pandemic.

24 October 2020 7	Olimpik Donetsk	0–2	Desna Chernihiv	Kyiv
17:00 EEST (UTC+03:00)	Benito (yellow card) 26'; Zahedi (yellow card) 61'	Report	Shevtsov 24'; Imerekov (yellow card) 30'; Totovytskyi 37', (yellow card) 79'; Hitchenko (yellow card) 48'	Stadium: Dynamo Stadium; Attendance: 0 Referee: Denys Shurman

31 October 2020 8	Kolos Kovalivka	1–2	Olimpik Donetsk	Kovalivka
14:00 EET (UTC+02:00)	Zadoya (yellow card) 8'; Danfa (yellow card) 25'; Havrysh (yellow card) 61'; Ilyin (yellow card) 65'; Seleznyov 86' (pen.)	Report	Benito (yellow card) 15', (goal) 17'; Babenko (yellow card) 20'; Zahedi 62' (pen.); Dramé (yellow card) 64'; Politylo (yellow card) 74'	Stadium: Kolos Stadium; Attendance: 0 Referee: Maksym Kozyryatskyi
Note: Match was played behind closed doors due to quarantine in Ukraine during COVID-19 pandemic.

7 November 2020 9	Olimpik Donetsk	3–3	FC Mariupol	Kyiv
14:00 EET (UTC+02:00)	Benito (yellow card) 33', (goal) 36'; Zaviyskyi (yellow card) 58'; Dramé (yellow card) 62'; Babenko (yellow card) 75'; Politylo 79'; Kargbo 90+5'	Report	Sikan 44' (pen.); Myshnyov 45+2' (pen.), (yellow card) 65'; Tankovskyi 73'; Ocheretko (yellow card) 90+4'	Stadium: Dynamo Stadium; Attendance: 0 Referee: Denys Shurman
Note: Match was played behind closed doors due to quarantine in Ukraine during COVID-19 pandemic.

29 November 2020 11	Inhulets Petrove	2–1	Olimpik Donetsk	Kropyvnytskyi
19:30 EET (UTC+02:00)	Sichinava 17'; Bartulović 54'; Lupashko (yellow card) 69'; Yanakov (yellow card) 76'; Balan (yellow card) 90+4'	Report	Politylo (yellow card) 32'; Romanovskij (yellow card) 46'; Snurnitsyn (yellow card) 61'; Zahedi 90+5' (pen.)	Stadium: Zirka Stadium; Attendance: 0 Referee: Dmytro Bondarenko
Note: Match was played behind closed doors due to quarantine in Ukraine during COVID-19 pandemic.

6 December 2020 12	Olimpik Donetsk	3–1	Rukh Lviv	Kyiv
14:00 EET (UTC+02:00)	Zahedi 8', 62'; Benito 24', (yellow card) 65'	Report	Kopyna (yellow card) 51'; Kondrakov 69'; Klymchuk (yellow card) 72'	Stadium: Dynamo Stadium; Attendance: 0 Referee: Mykola Balakin
Note: Match was played behind closed doors due to quarantine in Ukraine during COVID-19 pandemic.

11 December 2020 13	Olimpik Donetsk	1–1	FC Lviv	Kyiv
19:00 EET (UTC+02:00)	Alvarenga (yellow card) 28'; Romanovskij 76'; Andriy Kravchuk (yellow card) 90+2'	Report	Rafael Sabino (yellow card) 35'; Yuriy Kravchuk 56'; Klymenchuk (yellow card) 79'	Stadium: Dynamo Stadium; Attendance: 0 Referee: Oleksiy Derevinskyi
Note: Match was played behind closed doors due to quarantine in Ukraine during COVID-19 pandemic.

13 February 2021 14	Dynamo Kyiv	3–1	Olimpik Donetsk	Kyiv
17:00 EET (UTC+02:00)	Besyedin (yellow card) 14', (goal) 30', 90' de Pena (yellow card) 45'; Buyalskyi 77'; Popov (yellow card) 90+3'	Report	Nkeng (yellow card) 9' (yellow-red card) 76'; Alvarenga 20'; Khamelyuk (yellow card) 45+1'; Lebedenko (red card) 89'	Stadium: Dynamo Stadium; Attendance: 0 Referee: Maksym Kozyryatskyi
Note: Match was played behind closed doors due to quarantine in Ukraine during COVID-19 pandemic.

22 February 2021 15	Olimpik Donetsk	0–2	SC Dnipro-1	Kyiv
19:00 EET (UTC+02:00)	Politylo (yellow card) 45+1'; Zotko (yellow card) 65'; Pasich (yellow card) 86'; Benito (yellow card) 90+2'	Report	Ihnatenko (yellow card) 45+1'; Dramé 50' (o.g.); Buletsa 88'	Stadium: Dynamo Stadium; Attendance: 0 Referee: Dmytro Kryvushkin
Note: Match was played behind closed doors due to quarantine in Ukraine during COVID-19 pandemic.

28 February 2021 16	FC Mynai	2–1	Olimpik Donetsk	Uzhhorod
14:00 EET (UTC+02:00)	Nuriyev 13' (pen.), 45+1', (yellow card) 19' (yellow-red card) 85'; Kovtun (yellow card) 58'; Kozhanov (yellow card) 66'; Popovich (yellow card) 77'	Report	Nkeng 21'; Dramé (yellow card) 50'; Kargbo (yellow card) 58'; Do Couto (yellow card) 73'; Lebedenko (yellow card) 76'	Stadium: Avanhard Stadium; Attendance: 1,400; Referee: Roman Blavatskyi

6 March 2021 17	Olimpik Donetsk	0–1	Shakhtar Donetsk	Kyiv
17:00 EET (UTC+02:00)	Nkeng (yellow card) 23'; Babenko (yellow card) 67' (yellow-red card) 83'; Do Couto (yellow card) 71'	Report	Dodô 24'; Ismaily (yellow card) 64'; Dentinho (yellow card) 85'	Stadium: Dynamo Stadium; Attendance: 1,000; Referee: Yuriy Ivanov

14 March 2021 18	FC Oleksandriya	2–0	Olimpik Donetsk	Oleksandriya
19:30 EET (UTC+02:00)	Bondarenko 28'; Sitalo (yellow card) 39'; Banada (yellow card) 73'; Stetskov 90'	Report	Dramé (yellow card) 45'; Romanovskij (yellow card) 56'	Stadium: CSC Nika Stadium; Attendance: 689; Referee: Oleksiy Derevinskyi

20 March 2021 19	Vorskla Poltava	3–0	Olimpik Donetsk	Poltava
19:30 EET (UTC+02:00)	Stepanyuk 13', 55'; Snurnitsyn 25' (o.g.); Kulach (yellow card) 77'	Report	Zotko (yellow card) 44'	Stadium: Vorskla Stadium; Attendance: 0 Referee: Yaroslav Kozyk
Note: Match was played behind closed doors due to quarantine in Ukraine during COVID-19 pandemic.

3 April 2021 20	Desna Chernihiv	2–0	Olimpik Donetsk	Chernihiv
19:30 EEST (UTC+03:00)	Totovytskyi 43'; Bezborodko 70'; Sukhotskyi (yellow card) 79'	Report	Kargbo (yellow card) 58'; Benito (yellow card) 68'	Stadium: Chernihiv Stadium; Attendance: 0 Referee: Oleksandr Shandor
Note: Match was played behind closed doors due to quarantine in Ukraine during COVID-19 pandemic.

11 April 2021 21	Olimpik Donetsk	1–2	Kolos Kovalivka	Kovalivka
19:30 EEST (UTC+03:00)	Benito (yellow card) 22'; Kargbo 30'; Ekra (yellow card) 50' (yellow-red card) 56'; Babenko (yellow card) 60'; Nkeng (yellow card) 65'; Kychak (yellow card) 84'	Report	Zolotov (yellow card) 42'; Kostyshyn 68' (pen.); Antyukh (yellow card) 78'; Milko 87'	Stadium: Kolos Stadium; Attendance: 0 Referee: Oleksandr Derdo
Note: Match was played behind closed doors due to quarantine in Ukraine during COVID-19 pandemic.

18 April 2021 22	FC Mariupol	1–1	Olimpik Donetsk	Kharkiv
17:00 EEST (UTC+03:00)	Kulakov 5', (yellow card) 63'	Report	Nkeng 26' (pen.); Dramé (yellow card) 47'; Babenko (yellow card) 56'	Stadium: OSC Metalist; Attendance: 0 Referee: Viktor Kopiyevskyi
Note: Match was played behind closed doors due to quarantine in Ukraine during COVID-19 pandemic.

25 April 2021 23	Zorya Luhansk	2–1	Olimpik Donetsk	Zaporizhia
14:00 EEST (UTC+03:00)	Yurchenko 12' (pen.); Kabayev (yellow card) 23'; Favorov (yellow card) 53'; Zahedi 71'	Report	Ekra (yellow card) 33'; Kargbo 54' (pen.)	Stadium: Slavutych-Arena; Attendance: 0 Referee: Maksym Kozyryatskyi
Note: Match was played behind closed doors due to quarantine in Ukraine during COVID-19 pandemic.

28 April 2021 10	Olimpik Donetsk	2–1	Zorya Luhansk	Chernihiv
17:00 EEST (UTC+03:00)	Kargbo (yellow card) 18'; Talles (yellow card) 44'; Babenko (yellow card) 45+3', (goal) 53'; Veklyak (yellow card) 48'; Do Couto 72'; Kychak (yellow card) 90+1'	Report	Vasilj (red card) 32'; Khomchenovskyi (yellow card) 45+2'; Kocherhin (yellow card) 70'; Rufati (yellow card) 89'; Sayyadmanesh 90+2', (yellow card) 90+2'	Stadium: Chernihiv Stadium; Attendance: 0 Referee: Mykola Balakin
Note: Match was played behind closed doors due to quarantine in Ukraine during COVID-19 pandemic.

2 May 2021 24	Olimpik Donetsk	0–3	Inhulets Petrove	Chernihiv
19:30 EEST (UTC+03:00)	Chogadze (yellow card) 9'; Zotko (yellow card) 68'	Report	Vasin (yellow card) 15'; Yanakov 33'; Sichinava 48'; Shevtsov 87'	Stadium: Chernihiv Stadium; Attendance: 0 Referee: Dmytro Kryvushkin
Note: Match was played behind closed doors due to quarantine in Ukraine during COVID-19 pandemic.

6 May 2021 25	Rukh Lviv	3–0	Olimpik Donetsk	Lviv
19:00 EEST (UTC+03:00)	Prytula 4'; Boryachuk 17'; Klymchuk 26' (pen.); Bilyi (yellow card) 71'; Stamenković (yellow card) 82'	Report	Benito (yellow card) 35'	Stadium: Arena Lviv; Attendance: 1,200; Referee: Serhiy Boyko

9 May 2021 26	FC Lviv	1–1	Olimpik Donetsk	Lviv
17:00 EEST (UTC+03:00)	Renan 28'; Antwi (yellow card) 79'; Dovhyi (yellow card) 89'	Report	Alvarenga (yellow card) 61'; Khamelyuk 86'	Stadium: Arena Lviv; Attendance: 1,150; Referee: Anastasiya Romanyuk

=== Ukrainian Cup ===
13 November 2020 Round of 32 (1/16)	VPK-Ahro Shevchenkivka	1–0	Olimpik Donetsk	Dnipro
14:00 EET (UTC+02:00)	Sydorenko 47' (pen.); Budnyak (yellow card) 68'; Shmyhelskyi (yellow card) 80'; Shapovalov (yellow card) 85'	Report	Tsymbalyuk (yellow card) 64'; Benito (yellow card) 77'	Stadium: Meteor Stadium; Attendance: 0 Referee: Oleksiy Derevinskyi

== Statistics ==
=== Appearances and goals ===
No.	Pos	Nat	Player	Total		Premier League		Cup	
No.	Pos	Nat	Player	Apps	Goals	Apps	Goals	Apps	Goals
Goalkeepers
1	GK	(Ukraine) UKR	Artem Kychak	17	0	16+1	0	0	0
12	GK	(Kosovo) KOS	Betim Halimi	9	0	8	0	1	0
35	GK	(Ukraine) UKR	Andrii Chekotun	2	0	2	0	0	0
Defenders
2	DF	(Ukraine) UKR	Bohdan Veklyak	4	0	4	0	0	0
6	DF	(France) FRA	Issiar Dramé	18	0	16+1	0	1	0
13	DF	(Ukraine) UKR	Ivan Zotko	15	1	15	1	0	0
54	DF	(Ukraine) UKR	Orest Lebedenko	23	0	23	0	0	0
74	DF	(Ukraine) UKR	Ihor Snurnitsyn	18	0	16+2	0	0	0
Midfielders
4	MF	(Ukraine) UKR	Yevhen Tsymbalyuk	9	0	6+2	0	1	0
7	MF	(Georgia (country)) GEO	Temur Chogadze	15	0	4+10	0	1	0
9	MF	(Ukraine) UKR	Taras Zaviyskyi	18	0	11+6	0	1	0
11	MF	(Ukraine) UKR	Vladyslav Khamelyuk	4	1	3+1	1	0	0
14	MF	(Lithuania) LTU	Daniel Romanovskij	13	1	5+8	1	0	0
18	MF	(Argentina) ARG	Fabricio Alvarenga	15	1	9+6	1	0	0
19	MF	(France) FRA	Maxime Do Couto	22	3	17+5	3	0	0
20	MF	(Ukraine) UKR	Ruslan Babenko	23	1	22	1	1	0
22	MF	(Nigeria) NGR	Benito	19	3	14+4	3	1	0
30	MF	(Brazil) BRA	Talles	13	0	8+5	0	0	0
42	MF	(Ukraine) UKR	Yevhen Pasich	24	0	22+1	0	1	0
55	MF	(Ivory Coast) CIV	Geo Danny Ekra	2	0	2	0	0	0
89	MF	(Ukraine) UKR	Serhiy Politylo	26	3	25	3	0+1	0
Forwards
17	FW	(Cameroon) CMR	Taddeus Nkeng	10	2	8+2	2	0	0
33	FW	(Belgium) BEL	Ibrahim Kargbo Jr.	21	3	8+12	3	1	0
Players transferred out during the season
4	DF	(Ukraine) UKR	Dmytro Hryshko	2	0	1+1	0	0	0
5	DF	(Ukraine) UKR	Rizvan Ablitarov	3	0	0+2	0	1	0
8	FW	(Iran) IRI	Shahab Zahedi	12	8	10+1	8	0+1	0
11	MF	(Ukraine) UKR	Pavlo Ksyonz	8	0	4+4	0	0	0
16	DF	(Ukraine) UKR	Pavlo Lukyanchuk	1	0	0+1	0	0	0
17	FW	(Ukraine) UKR	Denys Balanyuk	1	0	0+1	0	0	0
21	MF	(Ukraine) UKR	Andriy Kravchuk	5	0	2+2	0	1	0
28	DF	(Ukraine) UKR	Yevhen Neplyakh	1	0	0+1	0	0	0
77	MF	(Belarus) BLR	Kirill Kirilenko	3	0	0+3	0	0	0

Source: Competitions

Last updated: 9 May 2021

=== Goalscorers ===
Rank	No.	Pos	Nat	Name	Premier League	Cup	Total
1	8	FW	(Iran)	Shahab Zahedi	8	0	8
2	19	MF	(France)	Maxime Do Couto	3	0	3
2	22	MF	(Nigeria)	Benito	3	0	3
2	33	FW	(Belgium)	Ibrahim Kargbo Jr.	3	0	3
2	89	MF	(Ukraine)	Serhiy Politylo	3	0	3
6	17	FW	(Cameroon)	Taddeus Nkeng	2	0	2
7	11	MF	(Ukraine)	Vladyslav Khamelyuk	1	0	1
7	13	DF	(Ukraine)	Ivan Zotko	1	0	1
7	14	MF	(Lithuania)	Daniel Romanovskij	1	0	1
7	18	MF	(Argentina)	Fabricio Alvarenga	1	0	1
7	20	MF	(Ukraine)	Ruslan Babenko	1	0	1
				Own goal	1	0	1
				Total	28	0	28

Last updated: 9 May 2021

=== Clean sheets ===
Rank	No.	Pos	Nat	Name	Premier League	Cup	Total
1	1	GK	(Ukraine)	Artem Kychak	1	0	1
				Total	1	0	1

Last updated: 9 May 2021

=== Disciplinary record ===
No.	Pos	Nat	Player	Premier League			Cup			Total		
No.	Pos	Nat	Player	Booked	(yellow card) (yellow-red card)	Sent off (straight red)	Booked	(yellow card) (yellow-red card)	Sent off (straight red)	Booked	(yellow card) (yellow-red card)	Sent off (straight red)
1	GK	(Ukraine)	Artem Kychak	3	0	0	0	0	0	3	0	0
2	DF	(Ukraine)	Bohdan Veklyak	1	0	0	0	0	0	1	0	0
4	MF	(Ukraine)	Yevhen Tsymbalyuk	0	0	0	1	0	0	1	0	0
6	DF	(France)	Issiar Dramé	5	0	0	0	0	0	5	0	0
7	MF	(Georgia (country))	Temur Chogadze	1	0	0	0	0	0	1	0	0
8	FW	(Iran)	Shahab Zahedi	2	0	0	0	0	0	2	0	0
9	MF	(Ukraine)	Taras Zaviyskyi	1	0	0	0	0	0	1	0	0
11	MF	(Ukraine)	Vladyslav Khamelyuk	1	0	0	0	0	0	1	0	0
13	DF	(Ukraine)	Ivan Zotko	3	0	0	0	0	0	3	0	0
14	MF	(Lithuania)	Daniel Romanovskij	2	0	0	0	0	0	2	0	0
17	FW	(Cameroon)	Taddeus Nkeng	2	1	0	0	0	0	2	1	0
18	MF	(Argentina)	Fabricio Alvarenga	3	0	0	0	0	0	3	0	0
19	MF	(France)	Maxime Do Couto	4	0	0	0	0	0	4	0	0
20	MF	(Ukraine)	Ruslan Babenko	7	1	0	0	0	0	7	1	0
21	MF	(Ukraine)	Andriy Kravchuk	1	0	0	0	0	0	1	0	0
22	MF	(Nigeria)	Benito	9	0	0	1	0	0	10	0	0
30	MF	(Brazil)	Talles	1	0	0	0	0	0	1	0	0
33	FW	(Belgium)	Ibrahim Kargbo Jr.	3	0	0	0	0	0	3	0	0
42	MF	(Ukraine)	Yevhen Pasich	1	0	0	0	0	0	1	0	0
54	DF	(Ukraine)	Orest Lebedenko	1	0	1	0	0	0	1	0	1
55	MF	(Ivory Coast)	Geo Danny Ekra	1	1	0	0	0	0	1	1	0
74	DF	(Ukraine)	Ihor Snurnitsyn	3	0	0	0	0	0	3	0	0
89	MF	(Ukraine)	Serhiy Politylo	4	0	0	0	0	0	4	0	0
			Total	59	3	1	2	0	0	61	3	1

Last updated: 9 May 2021

=== Attendances ===
	Matches	Attendances	Average	High	Low
Premier League	13	1,000	76	1,000	0
Cup	0	0	0	0	0
Total	13	1,000	76	1,000	0

Last updated: 9 May 2021
