= Alvarenga =

Alvarenga may refer to:

== People with the surname ==
- Alvarenga Peixoto (1744–1793), pen name Eureste Fenício, colonial Brazilian neoclassic poet and lawyer
- Abraham Alvarenga Urbina (born 1974), Honduran lawyer and politician
- Carlos Alvarenga (born 1982), Paraguayan footballer
- Cesar Diaz Alvarenga (fl. 1998–2009), rapper with hip-hop group Pescozada
- Fabricio Alvarenga (born 1996), Argentine footballer
- Fernanda Alvarenga (born 1986), Brazilian competitive swimmer
- Guido Alvarenga (born 1970), nicknamed El Mago, Paraguayan football player
- Herculano Marcos Ferraz de Alvarenga (born 1947), Brazilian scientist
- José Salvador Alvarenga (born 1975), Salvadoran fisherman and castaway
- Manuel Inácio da Silva Alvarenga (1749–1814), Brazilian poet
- Mauricio Alvarenga (born 1951), nicknamed Tarzan, Salvadoran footballer
- Reiver Alvarenga (born 1978), Venezuelan judoka
- Sandra Alvarenga (fl. 2009–2010), drummer with rock band Black Veil Brides

== Places ==
- Alvarenga, Minas Gerais, a Brazilian municipality
- Alvarenga (Arouca), a Portuguese community
- Estádio Onésio Brasileiro Alvarenga, a stadium in Goiânia, Brazil

== Other uses ==
- Alvarenga (fly), a robber fly in the family Asilidae
