= Urbina =

Urbina is a Basque (Spanish) surname. Notable people with the surname include:

- Abraham Alvarenga Urbina (born 1974), Honduran lawyer and politician
- Carlo Urbina (16th century), Italian painter, active in Crema
- Fabián Urbina (c. 2000–2017), Venezuelan protester killed during the 2017 Venezuelan protests
- Guadalupe Urbina (born 1959), Costa Rican singer-songwriter, poet, and activist
- Héctor Urbina (born 1987), Mexican mixed martial artist
- Ian Urbina (born March 29, 1972), American investigative reporter
- Ignacio de Urbina (1632–1703), Spanish Roman Catholic prelate in the New Kingdom of Granada and Viceroyalty of New Spain
- Jesús Urbina (born 1983), Mexican footballer who played as a goalkeeper
- Jorge Urbina (diplomat) (born 1946), Costa Rican diplomat, Permanent Representative to the United Nations
- Jorge Urbina (footballer) (born 1977), Mexican football manager and former player
- José de Urbina y Urbina, 3rd conde de Cartaojal (1761–1833), Spanish general during the Revolutionary and Napoleonic Wars
- Karina Urbina, Argentine transgender rights activist.
- Marcos Urbina (born 1985), defender currently playing for the club Monarcas Morelia
- María Lavalle Urbina (1908–1996), Mexican lawyer and politician, first female president of the Mexican Senate
- María Mónica Urbina (born 1967), Colombian former model and beauty pageant titleholder who won Miss Colombia 1985
- María Urbina (born 1968), Mexican Olympic swimmer
- Nazari Urbina (born 1989), Mexican tennis player.
- Oscar Urbina Ortega (born 1947), Colombian prelate of the Roman Catholic Church
- Pablo Urbina (born 1988), Spanish conductor
- Pedro Urbina Montoya (1585–1663), Spanish Roman Catholic prelate who served as Bishop of Coria, Archbishop of Valencia and Archbishop of Seville
- Rafael Simon Urbina (1897–1950), Venezuelan rebel fighting against the dictatorial regime of Juan Vicente Gomez
- Ricardo M. Urbina (1946–2024), United States District Court Judge in Washington, DC
- Rodolfo Urbina (1940–2024), Chilean historian
- Silvia Urbina (1928–2016), Chilean singer and researcher in folkloric music of Chile
- Susana Urbina (born 1946), Peruvian-American psychologist
- Teresa Urbina (born 1985), Spanish runner competing primarily in the 3000 metres steeplechase
- Tomás Urbina (c. 1877 – 1915), general in the Mexican Revolution
- Ugueth Urbina (born 1974), former relief pitcher in Major League Baseball
- Ximena Urbina, Chilean historian
- Yanci Urbina (1964–2022), Salvadoran politician
