= 2019–20 FC Dynamo Kyiv season =

Dynamo Kyiv
2019–20 season
- President: Ihor Surkis
- Manager: Alyaksandr Khatskevich (until 14 August 2019); Oleksiy Mykhaylychenko (since 15 August 2019)
- Stadium: NSC Olimpiyskiy
- Ukrainian Premier League: 2nd
- Ukrainian Cup: Winners
- Ukrainian Super Cup: Winners
- UEFA Champions League: Third qualifying round
- UEFA Europa League: Group stage
- Top goalscorer: League: Viktor Tsyhankov (14); All: Viktor Tsyhankov (17)
- Highest home attendance: 42,152 (vs Club Brugge, 13 August 2019)
- Lowest home attendance: 0 (all home matches were played behind closed doors starting 15 March 2020)
- Average home league attendance: 8,841
Home colours	Away colours	Third colours

The 2019–20 season was the 29th consecutive season in the top Ukrainian football league for Dynamo Kyiv. Dynamo competed in Premier League, Ukrainian Cup, UEFA Champions League and 2019 Ukrainian Super Cup.

== Players ==
=== Squad information ===
As of 19 July 2020

Squad no.	Name	Nationality	Position	Date of birth (age)
Goalkeepers
1	Heorhiy Bushchan	(Ukraine)	GK	31 May 1994 (aged 26)
31	Vladyslav Kucheruk ^{List B}	(Ukraine)	GK	14 February 1999 (aged 21)
71	Denys Boyko	(Ukraine)	GK	29 January 1988 (aged 32)
Defenders
4	Denys Popov ^{List B}	(Ukraine)	DF	17 February 1999 (aged 21)
16	Vitaliy Mykolenko ^{List B}	(Ukraine)	DF	29 May 1999 (aged 21)
23	Josip Pivarić	(Croatia)	DF	30 January 1989 (aged 31)
26	Mykyta Burda	(Ukraine)	DF	24 March 1995 (aged 25)
30	Artem Shabanov	(Ukraine)	DF	7 March 1992 (aged 28)
34	Oleksandr Syrota ^{List B}	(Ukraine)	DF	11 June 2000 (aged 20)
94	Tomasz Kędziora	(Poland)	DF	11 June 1994 (aged 26)
Midfielders
5	Serhiy Sydorchuk (Captain)	(Ukraine)	MF	2 May 1991 (aged 29)
6	Mohammed Kadiri	(Ghana)	MF	7 March 1996 (aged 24)
7	Benjamin Verbič	(Slovenia)	MF	27 November 1993 (aged 26)
8	Volodymyr Shepelyev	(Ukraine)	MF	1 June 1997 (aged 23)
14	Carlos de Pena	(Uruguay) (Italy)	MF	11 March 1992 (aged 28)
15	Viktor Tsyhankov ^{List B}	(Ukraine)	MF	15 November 1997 (aged 22)
18	Oleksandr Andriyevskyi	(Ukraine)	MF	24 June 1994 (aged 26)
20	Oleksandr Karavayev	(Ukraine)	MF	2 June 1992 (aged 28)
22	Gerson Rodrigues	(Luxembourg)	MF	20 June 1995 (aged 25)
29	Vitaliy Buyalskyi	(Ukraine)	MF	6 January 1993 (aged 27)
70	Nazariy Rusyn ^{List B}	(Ukraine)	FW	25 October 1998 (aged 21)
77	Olabiran Muyiwa ^{List B}	(Nigeria) (Ivory Coast)	MF/FW	7 September 1998 (aged 21)
99	Mikkel Duelund	(Denmark)	MF	29 June 1997 (aged 23)
Forwards
9	Fran Sol	(Spain)	FW	13 March 1992 (aged 28)
10	Mykola Shaparenko ^{List B}	(Ukraine)	FW	4 October 1998 (aged 21)
11	Heorhiy Tsitaishvili ^{List B}	(Ukraine)	FW	18 November 2000 (aged 19)
27	Yevhen Isayenko ^{List B}	(Ukraine)	FW	7 August 2000 (aged 19)
33	Ibrahim Kargbo Jr. ^{List B}	(Belgium) (Sierra Leone)	FW	3 January 2000 (aged 20)
41	Artem Besyedin	(Ukraine)	FW	31 March 1996 (aged 24)

== Transfers ==
=== In ===
Date	Pos.	Player	Age	Moving from	Type	Fee	Source
Summer
3 June 2019	DF	(Ghana) Mohammed Kadiri	23	Austria Wien	Transfer	Undisclosed	
27 June 2019	DF	(Ukraine) Oleksandr Karavayev	27	(Ukraine) Zorya Luhansk	Transfer	Undisclosed	
2 August 2019	MF	(Luxembourg) Gerson Rodrigues	27	(Japan) Júbilo Iwata	Transfer	Undisclosed	
5 December 2019	FW	(Belgium) Ibrahim Kargbo Jr.	19	(Belgium) Roeselare	Transfer	Free	
31 June 2019	GK	(Ukraine) Maksym Koval	26	(Saudi Arabia) Al-Fateh	Loan return		
31 June 2019	DF	(Ukraine) Vladyslav Dubinchak	20	(Ukraine) Arsenal Kyiv	Loan return		
31 June 2019	DF	(Ukraine) Pavlo Lukyanchuk	23	(Hungary) Kisvárda	Loan return		
31 June 2019	DF	(Ukraine) Mykola Morozyuk	31	(Turkey) Çaykur Rizespor	Loan return		
31 June 2019	DF	(Ukraine) Zurab Ochihava	24	(Ukraine) SC Dnipro-1	Loan return		
31 June 2019	DF	(Ukraine) Oleksandr Osman	23	(Ukraine) Arsenal Kyiv	Loan return		
31 June 2019	DF	(Serbia) Aleksandar Pantić	27	(Spain) Cádiz	Loan return		
31 June 2019	DF	(Peru) Carlos Zambrano	29	(Switzerland) Basel	Loan return		
31 June 2019	MF	(Ukraine) Ivan Kaliuzhnyi	21	(Ukraine) Metalist 1925 Kharkiv	Loan return		
31 June 2019	MF	(Belarus) Nikita Korzun	24	(Saudi Arabia) Al-Fateh	Loan return		
31 June 2019	MF	(Ukraine) Bohdan Mykhaylychenko	22	(Ukraine) Zorya Luhansk	Loan return		
31 June 2019	MF	(Ukraine) Pavlo Orikhovskyi	23	(Ukraine) Arsenal Kyiv	Loan return		
31 June 2019	MF	(Ukraine) Denys Yanakov	20	(Ukraine) Arsenal Kyiv	Loan return		
31 June 2019	FW	(Ukraine) Vladyslav Alekseyev	21	(Ukraine) Arsenal Kyiv	Loan return		
31 June 2019	FW	(Ukraine) Artem Khotsyanovskyi	20	(Ukraine) Avanhard Kramatorsk	Loan return		
31 June 2019	FW	(Ukraine) Danyil Sukhoruchko	19	(Ukraine) Arsenal Kyiv	Loan return		
Winter
3 January 2020	MF	(Nigeria) Olabiran Muyiwa	21	(Russia) FC Tambov	Transfer	Free	
31 December 2019	DF	(Georgia (country)) Luka Lochoshvili	21	(Slovakia) MŠK Žilina	Loan return		
31 December 2019	MF	(Ukraine) Roman Vantukh	21	(Ukraine) Olimpik Donetsk	Loan return		
31 December 2019	FW	(Ukraine) Nazariy Rusyn	21	(Ukraine) FC Zorya Luhansk	Loan return		
6 February 2020	MF	(Paraguay) Derlis González	25	(Brazil) Santos	Loan return		

=== Out ===
Date	Pos.	Player	Age	Moving to	Type	Fee	Source
Summer
24 June 2019	GK	(Ukraine) Artur Rudko	27	(Cyprus) Pafos	Transfer	Undisclosed	
1 July 2019	GK	(Ukraine) Maksym Koval	26	(Saudi Arabia) Al-Fateh	Transfer	Undisclosed	
1 July 2019	DF	(Ukraine) Mykola Morozyuk	31	(Turkey) Rizespor	Transfer	Undisclosed	
1 July 2019	MF	(Ukraine) Bohdan Mykhaylychenko	22	(Ukraine) Zorya Luhansk	Transfer	Undisclosed	
5 July 2019	DF	(Ukraine) Oleksandr Osman	23	(Ukraine) Metalist 1925 Kharkiv	Transfer / Loan ?	Undisclosed	
24 July 2019	MF	(Ukraine) Ivan Kaliuzhnyi	21	(Ukraine) Rukh Lviv	Transfer / Loan ?		
4 August 2019	MF	(Ukraine) Pavlo Orikhovskyi	23	(Ukraine) Kolos Kovalivka	Transfer	Undisclosed	
7 August 2019	MF	(Ukraine) Artem Khotsyanovskyi	20	(Ukraine) Hirnyk-Sport Horishni Plavni	Transfer / Loan ?		
9 August 2019	DF	(Ukraine) Zurab Ochihava	24	(Ukraine) Vorskla Poltava	Transfer	Undisclosed	
2 September 2019	DF	(Serbia) Aleksandar Pantić	27	Unattached	Transfer	Free	
13 September 2019	DF	(Ukraine) Pavlo Lukyanchuk	23	(Ukraine) Olimpik Donetsk	Transfer	Undisclosed	
24 June 2019	MF	(Ukraine) Serhiy Buletsa	20	(Ukraine) SC Dnipro-1	Loan		
26 June 2019	MF	(Ukraine) Vladyslav Supriaha	19	(Ukraine) SC Dnipro-1	Loan		
2 July 2019	DF	(Ukraine) Vladyslav Dubinchak	21	(Ukraine) Karpaty Lviv	Loan		
11 July 2019	MF	(Ukraine) Yevhen Smyrnyi	20	(Ukraine) Kolos Kovalivka	Loan		
29 July 2019	DF	(Ukraine) Akhmed Alibekov	21	(Czech Republic) Slovan Liberec	Loan		
3 August 2019	FW	(Ukraine) Nazariy Rusyn	20	(Ukraine) Zorya Luhansk	Loan		
22 August 2019	MF	(Ukraine) Yuriy Shpyrka	21	(Ukraine) Prykarpattia Ivano-Frankivsk	Loan		
30 August 2019	DF	(Ukraine) Alan Aussi	18	(Czech Republic) Slovan Liberec	Loan		
2 September 2019	MF	(Belarus) Nikita Korzun	24	(Portugal) Vilafranquense	Loan		
Winter
31 January 2020	DF	(Peru) Carlos Zambrano	30	(Argentina) Boca Juniors	Transfer	Undisclosed	
7 February 2020	MF	(Paraguay) Derlis González	25	(Paraguay) Club Olimpia	Transfer	Undisclosed	
15 February 2020	MF	(Ukraine) Artem Kulakovskyi	20	(Ukraine) Vorskla Poltava	Transfer	Undisclosed	
19 February 2020	DF	(Ukraine) Taras Dmytruk	19	(Ukraine) Vorskla Poltava	Transfer	Undisclosed	
21 February 2020	DF	(Georgia (country)) Luka Lochoshvili	21	(Georgia (country)) Dinamo Tbilisi	Transfer	Free	
28 February 2020	DF	(Hungary) Tamás Kádár	29	(China) Shandong Luneng	Transfer	Undisclosed	
11 March 2020	GK	(Ukraine) Volodymyr Makhankov	22	(Ukraine) Karpaty Lviv	Transfer	Free	
1 January 2020	MF	(Ukraine) Mykyta Kravchenko	22	(Ukraine) Olimpik Donetsk	Loan		
1 January 2020	MF	(Ukraine) Roman Vantukh	21	(Ukraine) FC Oleksandriya	Loan		
5 January 2020	MF	(Ukraine) Denys Harmash	29	(Turkey) Çaykur Rizespor	Loan		
8 January 2020	DF	(Brazil) Sidcley	26	(Brazil) Corinthians	Loan		
31 January 2020	MF	(Luxembourg) Gerson Rodrigues	26	(Turkey) Ankaragücü	Loan		
21 February 2020	MF	(Ukraine) Denys Yanakov	21	(Ukraine) Chornomorets Odesa	Loan		

== Pre-season and friendlies ==
28 June 2019 Friendly	Dynamo Kyiv (Ukraine)	1–2	(Ukraine) Polissya Zhytomyr	Kyiv
13:00 EEST (UTC+03:00)	Kravchenko 37'	Report	Nemtinov 12'; Halenkov 74'	Stadium: Dynamo Training Center

4 July 2019 Friendly	Dynamo Kyiv (Ukraine)	1–1	(Romania) Botoșani	Kematen in Tirol, Austria
19:00 EEST (UTC+03:00)	Verbič 63'	Report	Aškovski 43'	Stadium: Sportplatz

5 July 2019 Friendly	Dynamo Kyiv (Ukraine)	3–0	(Austria) Wacker Innsbruck	Imst, Austria
19:00 EEST (UTC+03:00)	Karavayev 12'; Verbič 20'; Harmash 45'	Report

8 July 2019 Friendly	Dynamo Kyiv (Ukraine)	1–1	(Greece) Olympiacos	Schwaz, Austria
19:10 EEST (UTC+03:00)	Fran Sol 45' (pen.)	Report	Bouchalakis 5'	Stadium: Zilberstadt-Arena

9 July 2019 Friendly	Dynamo Kyiv (Ukraine)	5–0	(Austria) FC Zirl	Austria
19:00 EEST (UTC+03:00)	Besyedin 23'; Buyalskyi 32' de Pena 37'; Shaparenko 65'; Pivarić 83'	Report

13 July 2019 Friendly	Dynamo Kyiv (Ukraine)	0–0	(England) Brentford	Jenbach, Austria
13:00 EEST (UTC+03:00)		Report

14 July 2019 Friendly	Dynamo Kyiv (Ukraine)	Cancelled	(Austria) Schwaz	Schwaz, Austria
14:30 EEST (UTC+03:00)

21 July 2019 Friendly	Dynamo Kyiv (Ukraine)	1–1	(Ukraine) Obolon-Brovar Kyiv	Kyiv
11:30 EEST (UTC+03:00)	Tsitaishvili 11'	Report	Ostrovskyi 82'	Stadium: Dynamo Training Center

21 July 2019 Friendly	Dynamo Kyiv (Ukraine)	1–3	(Ukraine) Kolos Kovalivka	Kyiv
16:00 EEST (UTC+03:00)	Besyedin 58'	Report	Havrysh 55' (pen.); Nekhtiy 75'; Chornomorets 92'	Stadium: Dynamo Stadium; Attendance: 1,500

13 August 2019 Friendly	Dynamo Kyiv (Ukraine)	5–0	Belarus U-19	Kyiv
12:00 EEST (UTC+03:00)	Tsitaishvili 25'; Sidcley 38'; Yanakov 80'; Isayenko 81'; Shaparenko 83'	Report		Stadium: Dynamo Training Center

8 September 2019 Friendly	Dynamo Kyiv (Ukraine)	6–0	(Ukraine) Krystal Kherson	Kyiv
17:00 EEST (UTC+03:00)	Harmash 8', 65' de Pena 31', 87'; Fran Sol 58'; Sydorchuk 70'	Report		Stadium: Dynamo Training Center

13 October 2019 Friendly	Dynamo Kyiv (Ukraine)	3–0	(Ukraine) Chaika Petropavlivska Borshchahivka	Kyiv
15:00 EEST (UTC+03:00)	de Pena 14'; Besyedin 43'; Andriyevskyi 63'	Report		Stadium: Dynamo Training Center

17 November 2019 Friendly	Dynamo Kyiv (Ukraine)	5–0	(Ukraine) Obolon-Brovar Kyiv	Kyiv
13:00 EEST (UTC+03:00)	de Pena 20', 45', 48', 88'; Fran Sol 90'	Report		Stadium: Dynamo Stadium

19 January 2020 Friendly	Dynamo Kyiv (Ukraine)	1–1	(Poland) Legia Warsaw	Belek, Turkey
16:00 EET (UTC+02:00)	Tsitaishvili 45'	Report	Antolić 13'	Stadium: Cornelia

20 January 2020 Friendly	Dynamo Kyiv (Ukraine)	2–1	(Azerbaijan) Neftçi Baku	Belek, Turkey
16:00 EET (UTC+02:00)	Mykolenko 12'; Rusyn 19'	Report	Platellas 69'	Stadium: Gloria Sports Arena Belek

23 January 2020 Friendly	Dynamo Kyiv (Ukraine)	4–0	(North Macedonia) Vardar Skopje	Belek, Turkey
16:00 EET (UTC+02:00)	Buyalskyi 5'; Sydorchuk 7'; Duelund 30'; Rusyn 86'	Report		Stadium: Gloria Sports Arena

24 January 2020 Friendly	Dynamo Kyiv (Ukraine)	0–1	(Croatia) Hajduk Split	Belek, Turkey
17:00 EET (UTC+02:00)		Report	Radić 90'	Stadium: Gloria Sports Arena

27 January 2020 Friendly	Dynamo Kyiv (Ukraine)	3–0	(Belarus) Dynamo Brest	Belek, Turkey
16:00 EET (UTC+02:00)	Pivarić 22', 36'; Duelund 74'	Report		Stadium: Calista Hotel Sahasi Belek

28 January 2020 Friendly	Dynamo Kyiv (Ukraine)	2–0	(Kazakhstan) Kairat Almaty	Belek, Turkey
11:00 EET (UTC+02:00)	Kargbo 53', 74'	Report		Stadium: Gloria Sports Arena

5 February 2020 Friendly	Dynamo Kyiv (Ukraine)	5–0	(Slovenia) Olimpija Ljubljana	Belek, Turkey
16:30 EET (UTC+02:00)	Buyalskyi 10'; Verbič 27'; Rusyn 54' de Pena 81'; Romanchuk 90'	Report		Stadium: Bellis Hotel

6 February 2020 Friendly	Dynamo Kyiv (Ukraine)	3–0	(Norway) Strømsgodset	Belek, Turkey
16:00 EET (UTC+02:00)	de Pena 42'; Mykolenko 74'; Sydorchuk 82'	Report		Stadium: Gloria Serenity

9 February 2020 Friendly	Dynamo Kyiv (Ukraine)	4–1	(Bosnia and Herzegovina) Borac Banja Luka	Belek, Turkey
16:00 EET (UTC+02:00)	Mykolenko 43'; Kadiri 54'; Fran Sol 56' de Pena 66'	Report	Vranješ 70' (pen.)	Stadium: Gloria Serenity

11 February 2020 Friendly	Dynamo Kyiv (Ukraine)	1–1	(Belarus) BATE Borisov	Belek, Turkey
16:00 EET (UTC+02:00)	Verbič 34'	Report	Drahun 68' (pen.)	Stadium: Cornelia

12 February 2020 Friendly	Dynamo Kyiv (Ukraine)	2–4	(Kazakhstan) Tobol	Belek, Turkey
15:00 EET (UTC+02:00)	Fran Sol 12'; Duelund 39'	Report	Nurgaliev 44'; Muzhikov 47'; Murtazayev 58'; Avetisyan 72'	Stadium: Titanic Mardan Stadium

15 February 2020 Friendly	Dynamo Kyiv (Ukraine)	2–0	(Georgia (country)) Dinamo Tbilisi	Belek, Turkey
16:00 EET (UTC+02:00)	Kędziora 24'; Rusyn 53'	Report		Stadium: Gloria Serenity

22 May 2020 Friendly	Dynamo Kyiv (Ukraine)	0–0	(Ukraine) Rukh Lviv	Kyiv
16:00 EEST (UTC+03:00)		Report		Stadium: Dynamo Stadium; Referee: Yevhen Aranovskyi

27 May 2020 Friendly	Dynamo Kyiv (Ukraine)	2–0	(Ukraine) Olimpik Donetsk	Kyiv
14:00 EEST (UTC+03:00)	Tsitaishvili 2', 4'	Report		Stadium: Dynamo Stadium; Referee: Klym Zabroda

== Competitions ==
=== Overall ===
Competition	First match	Last match	Starting round	Final position	Record							
Competition	First match	Last match	Starting round	Final position	Pld	W	D	L	GF	GA	GD	Win %
Ukrainian Premier League	31 July 2019	19 July 2020	Matchday 1	2nd	32	18	5	9	65	35	+30	56.25
Ukrainian Cup	30 October 2019	8 July 2020	Round of 16 (1/8)	Winner	4	3	1	0	6	2	+4	75.00
Ukrainian Super Cup	28 July 2019	28 July 2019	Final	Winner	1	1	0	0	2	1	+1	100.00
UEFA Champions League	6 August 2019	13 August 2019	3Q	3Q	2	0	1	1	3	4	−1	0.00
UEFA Europa League	19 September 2019	12 December 2019	Group stage	3rd	6	1	4	1	7	7	+0	16.67
Total					45	23	11	11	83	49	+34	51.11

Last updated: 19 July 2020
Source: Competitions

=== Ukrainian Premier League ===
==== League table ====
Pos	Team	Pld	W	D	L	GF	GA	GD	Pts	Qualification or relegation
1	Shakhtar Donetsk (C)	32	26	4	2	80	26	+54	82	Qualification for the Champions League group stage
2	Dynamo Kyiv	32	18	5	9	65	35	+30	59	Qualification for the Champions League third qualifying round
3	Zorya Luhansk	32	17	7	8	50	29	+21	58	Qualification for the Europa League group stage
4	Desna Chernihiv	32	17	5	10	59	33	+26	56	Qualification for the Europa League third qualifying round
5	FC Oleksandriya	32	14	7	11	49	47	+2	49	Qualification for the playoff for Europa League second qualifying round

Source: Ukrainian Premier League, UEFA, Soccerway
Rules for classification: 1) Points; 2) Head-to-head points; 3) Head-to-head goal difference; 4) Head-to-head higher number of goals scored; 5) Goal difference; 6) Higher number of goals scored; 7) Draw or "golden match" if tied for title (Article 22, paragraph 3).
(C) Champions

==== Results summary ====
Overall								Home						Away					
Pld	W	D	L	GF	GA	GD	Pts	W	D	L	GF	GA	GD	W	D	L	GF	GA	GD
32	18	5	9	65	35	+30	59	9	3	4	32	16	+16	9	2	5	33	19	+14

Last updated: 19 July 2020.
Source: Competitive matches

==== Results by round ====
Round	1	2	3	4	5	6	7	8	9	10	11	12	13	14	15	16	17	18	19	20	21	22	23	24	25	26	27	28	29	30	31	32
Ground	A	A	H	A	H	A	H	A	H	A	H	H	H	A	H	A	H	A	H	A	H	A	H	A	H	A	H	A	H	A	H	A
Result	W	W	L	W	D	D	L	W	W	W	W	D	W	L	W	W	L	W	W	L	W	W	D	L	W	W	W	L	L	D	W	L
Position	2	2	3	3	5	5	6	6	3	3	2	2	2	4	2	2	4	2	2	3	3	2	3	4	3	2	2	2	3	3	2	2

Updated to match(es) played on 19 July 2020. Source: Competitive matches
A = Away; H = Home; W = Win; D = Draw; L = Loss

==== Matches ====
31 July 2019 1	Karpaty Lviv	0–2	Dynamo Kyiv	Lviv
19:30 EEST (UTC+03:00)	Karpenko (yellow card) 16'; Hutsulyak (yellow card) 45+1'; Verbnyi (yellow card) 83'	Report	Kádár (yellow card) 13'; Besyedin (yellow card) 27', (goal) 45+2' (pen.); Kovtun 42' (o.g.); Kędziora (yellow card) 67'; Mykolenko (yellow card) 79'	Stadium: Ukraina Stadium; Attendance: 12,135; Referee: Viktor Kopiyevskyi

3 August 2019 2	FC Lviv	0–3	Dynamo Kyiv	Lviv
19:30 EEST (UTC+03:00)	Bruno Duarte (yellow card) 21'; Rafael Sabino (yellow card) 81'; Alvaro (yellow card) 90'; China (yellow card) 90+2'	Report	Buyalskyi 45+1', 45+3' (pen.) de Pena 52', (yellow card) 59'; Besyedin (yellow card) 59'	Stadium: Arena Lviv; Attendance: 7,103; Referee: Ihor Paskhal

10 August 2019 3	Dynamo Kyiv	1–2	Shakhtar Donetsk	Kyiv
17:00 EEST (UTC+03:00)	Burda (yellow card) 21'; Rodrigues 39'; Shepelyev (yellow card) 42'; Andriyevskyi (yellow card) 72' de Pena (yellow card) 90+9'	Report	Moraes 21', (yellow card) 71'; Marlos 65'; Alan Patrick (yellow card) 78'; Dentinho (yellow card) 90+9'	Stadium: NSC Olimpiyskiy; Attendance: 41,203; Referee: Yaroslav Kozyk

24 August 2019 5	Dynamo Kyiv	1–1	Olimpik Donetsk	Kyiv
19:30 EEST (UTC+03:00)	Tsyhankov 62'; Burda (yellow card) 73'; Verbič (red card) 85'; Kádár (yellow card) 90+1'; Kadiri (yellow card) 90+3'	Report	Politylo 52'; Hryshko (red card) 68'; Zaviyskyi (yellow card) 85'; Salou (yellow card) 85'	Stadium: NSC Olimpiyskiy; Attendance: 14,713; Referee: Vitaliy Romanov

1 September 2019 6	Zorya Luhansk	2–2	Dynamo Kyiv	Zaporizhia
19:30 EEST (UTC+03:00)	Hromov 42'; Mykhaylychenko (yellow card) 45+1'; Yurchenko (yellow card) 55'; Abu Hanna (yellow card) 67', (goal) 82'	Report	Rodrigues 18'; Harmash (yellow card) 32' de Pena 36'; Burda (yellow card) 50'; Tsyhankov (yellow card) 90+2'	Stadium: Slavutych-Arena; Attendance: 6,352; Referee: Kostiantyn Trukhanov

15 September 2019 7	Dynamo Kyiv	1–2	Desna Chernihiv	Kyiv
17:00 EEST (UTC+03:00)	de Pena (yellow card) 45+2'; Besyedin 49'	Report	Kalitvintsev 40'; Filippov 56'; Ohirya (yellow card) 75'; Past (yellow card) 90+4'	Stadium: NSC Olimpiyskiy; Attendance: 15,452; Referee: Viktor Kopiyevskyi

22 September 2019 8	Vorskla Poltava	0–5	Dynamo Kyiv	Poltava
17:00 EEST (UTC+03:00)	Luizão (yellow card) 19'; Sklyar (yellow card) 40'	Report	Tsyhankov 9'; Besyedin (yellow card) 20', (goal) 46'; Shabanov 35' de Pena 37', 83'; Mykolenko (yellow card) 58'; Harmash (yellow card) 73'	Stadium: Vorskla Stadium; Attendance: 11,399; Referee: Yuriy Mozharovskyi

25 September 2019 4	FC Mariupol	0–1	Dynamo Kyiv	Mariupol
17:00 EEST (UTC+03:00)	Tyschenko (yellow card) 33'; Bykov (yellow card) 43'; Chekh (yellow card) 70'; Putrya (yellow card) 88'	Report	Verbič 90+2', (yellow card) 90+3'	Stadium: Volodymyr Boiko Stadium; Attendance: 8,196; Referee: Dmytro Bondarenko

28 September 2019 9	Dynamo Kyiv	2–0	SC Dnipro-1	Kyiv
17:00 EEST (UTC+03:00)	Verbič 30'; Shabanov (yellow card) 37'; Harmash (yellow card) 51'; Tsyhankov 80' (pen.)	Report	Batahov (yellow card) 40'; Supriaha (yellow card) 55'; Vakulko (yellow card) 71'; Nazarenko (yellow card) 76'; Safronov (yellow card) 90'	Stadium: NSC Olimpiyskiy; Attendance: 16,685; Referee: Anatoliy Abdula

6 October 2019 10	Kolos Kovalivka	0–4	Dynamo Kyiv	Kyiv
17:00 EEST (UTC+03:00)	Ilyin (yellow card) 53'; Maksymenko (red card) 54'; Orikhovskyi (yellow card) 62'; Milko (yellow card) 75'; Paramonov (yellow card) 87'	Report	Sydorchuk (yellow card) 19'; Shepelyev (yellow card) 45' (yellow-red card) 49'; Tsyhankov 56' (pen.); Besyedin 66', 81', (yellow card) 87'; Verbič (yellow card) 85', (goal) 90+5' (pen.)	Stadium: Obolon Arena; Attendance: 4,892; Referee: Andriy Kovalenko

20 October 2019 11	Dynamo Kyiv	1–0	FC Oleksandriya	Kyiv
17:00 EEST (UTC+03:00)	Mykolenko 32'; Tsyhankov (yellow card) 37'	Report	Bezborodko (yellow card) 25'	Stadium: NSC Olimpiyskiy; Attendance: 16,447; Referee: Mykola Balakin

27 October 2019 12	Dynamo Kyiv	1–1	Karpaty Lviv	Kyiv
17:00 EET (UTC+02:00)	Sydorchuk (yellow card) 39'; Verbič 49'; Popov (yellow card) 66'; Shaparenko (yellow card) 90+5'	Report	Di Franco (yellow card) 81'; Shabanov 85' (o.g.); Hall (yellow card) 90+3'	Stadium: NSC Olimpiyskiy; Attendance: 5,085; Referee: Dmytro Kryvushkin

3 November 2019 13	Dynamo Kyiv	4–0	FC Lviv	Kyiv
17:00 EET (UTC+02:00)	Shaparenko 11'; Sydorchuk (yellow card) 16' (yellow-red card) 36'; Tsyhankov 30' (pen.); Besyedin 82'; Popov 90+1'	Report	Pryimak (yellow card) 29'; Marthã (yellow card) 54'; Honchar (yellow card) 84'	Stadium: NSC Olimpiyskiy; Attendance: 7,843; Referee: Anatoliy Abdula

10 November 2019 14	Shakhtar Donetsk	1–0	Dynamo Kyiv	Kharkiv
17:00 EET (UTC+02:00)	Kryvtsov 17'; Kovalenko (yellow card) 60'; Dentinho (yellow card) 64'; Dodô (yellow card) 64'; Taison (red card) 82'	Report	Popov (yellow card) 9'; Shabanov (yellow card) 16'; Rodrigues (yellow card) 50'; Mykolenko (yellow card) 56'	Stadium: OSC Metalist; Attendance: 21,907; Referee: Mykola Balakin

24 November 2019 15	Dynamo Kyiv	3–0	FC Mariupol	Kyiv
17:00 EET (UTC+02:00)	Buyalskyi 21'; Besyedin (yellow card) 38'; Tsyhankov 78'; Verbič 81'	Report	Tyschenko (yellow card) 18'; Dawa (yellow card) 61'	Stadium: NSC Olimpiyskiy; Attendance: 6,792; Referee: Ihor Paskhal

1 December 2019 16	Olimpik Donetsk	1–3	Dynamo Kyiv	Kyiv
19:30 EET (UTC+02:00)	Tsymbalyuk (yellow card) 16'; Zahedi 38'; Do Couto (yellow card) 41'; Penkov (yellow card) 68'; Kravchuk (red card) 73'	Report	Besyedin 37', 79', (yellow card) 54' de Pena 87', (yellow card) 87'	Stadium: Dynamo Stadium; Attendance: 1,506; Referee: Vitaliy Romanov

8 December 2019 17	Dynamo Kyiv	1–2	Zorya Luhansk	Kyiv
17:00 EET (UTC+02:00)	Verbič 22', (yellow card) 66'; Kádár (yellow card) 33' (yellow-red card) 52'; Sydorchuk (yellow card) 85'	Report	Mykhaylychenko 6'; Khomchenovskyi 56', (yellow card) 90+4'; Cheberko (yellow card) 66'	Stadium: NSC Olimpiyskiy; Attendance: 8,814; Referee: Anatoliy Abdula

15 December 2019 18	Desna Chernihiv	0–1	Dynamo Kyiv	Chernihiv
14:00 EET (UTC+02:00)	Ohirya (yellow card) 9'; Kalitvintsev (yellow card) 42'; Konoplya (yellow card) 90+5'	Report	Tsyhankov 25'; Buyalskyi (yellow card) 81'; Bushchan (yellow card) 90+2'	Stadium: Chernihiv Stadium; Attendance: 5,243; Referee: Viktor Kopiyevskyi

22 February 2020 19	Dynamo Kyiv	2–1	Vorskla Poltava	Kyiv
17:00 EET (UTC+02:00)	Buyalskyi 50'; Verbič 90+1'	Report	Kane (yellow card) 32'; Šehić (yellow card) 52'; Kulach (yellow card) 57'; Stepanyuk 63'	Stadium: NSC Olimpiyskiy; Attendance: 0 Referee: Vitaliy Romanov

28 February 2020 20	SC Dnipro-1	3–1	Dynamo Kyiv	Dnipro
19:00 EET (UTC+02:00)	Nazarenko (yellow card) 34'; Supriaha 71', 82', 90'; Polyovyi (red card) 75'	Report	Buyalskyi (red card) 6'; Verbič 45+1' (pen.); Shepelyev (yellow card) 58'; Mykolenko (yellow card) 86'	Stadium: Dnipro-Arena; Attendance: 7,278; Referee: Kateryna Monzul

3 March 2020 21	Dynamo Kyiv	2–0	Kolos Kovalivka	Kyiv
19:30 EET (UTC+02:00)	Shaparenko (yellow card) 11'; Shabanov (yellow card) 28'; Fran Sol 41', (yellow card) 44'; Tsyhankov 54'	Report	Petrov (yellow card) 22'; Yemets (yellow card) 32'; Zadoya (red card) 45+2'; Yefremov (yellow card) 62'	Stadium: NSC Olimpiyskiy; Attendance: 8,434; Referee: Vitaliy Romanov

7 March 2020 22	FC Oleksandriya	1–3	Dynamo Kyiv	Oleksandriya
17:00 EET (UTC+02:00)	Zaderaka (yellow card) 17'; Stetskov (yellow card) 32'; Dovhyi (yellow card) 36' (yellow-red card) 47'; Pankiv (yellow card) 45'; Hrechyshkin 62' (pen.)	Report	Shabanov 45'; Sydorchuk (yellow card) 49'; Mykolenko (yellow card) 51', (goal) 85'; Buyalskyi 60'; Karavayev (yellow card) 79'	Stadium: CSC Nika Stadium; Attendance: 3,780; Referee: Yuriy Mozharovskyi

15 March 2020 23	Dynamo Kyiv	1–1	Desna Chernihiv	Kyiv
17:00 EET (UTC+02:00)	Rusyn (yellow card) 23', (goal) 69'	Report	Starenkyi (yellow card) 48'; Filippov 80'	Stadium: NSC Olimpiyskiy; Attendance: 0 Referee: Serhiy Boyko
Note: Match was played behind closed doors due to quarantine in Ukraine during COVID-19 pandemic.

31 May 2020 24	Shakhtar Donetsk	3–1	Dynamo Kyiv	Kyiv
17:00 EET (UTC+02:00)	Ismaily (yellow card) 24'; Marlos 39', 67'; Kovalenko (yellow card) 46'; Antônio 74'	Report	Popov (yellow card) 22'; Buyalskyi 38'	Stadium: NSC Olimpiyskiy; Attendance: 0 Referee: Kateryna Monzul
Note: Match was played behind closed doors due to quarantine in Ukraine during COVID-19 pandemic.

7 June 2020 25	Dynamo Kyiv	5–1	FC Oleksandriya	Kyiv
17:00 EEST (UTC+03:00)	Sydorchuk (yellow card) 7'; Buyalskyi 14', 83'; Rusyn 21' (pen.); Kadiri (yellow card) 31'; Shepelyev (yellow card) 45+2'; Andriyevskyi (yellow card) 50'; Mykolenko 65'; De Pena 81'	Report	Dubra (yellow card) 20' (yellow-red card) 55'; Banada (yellow card) 25'; Hrechyshkin 31' (pen.)	Stadium: NSC Olimpiyskiy; Attendance: 0 Referee: Vitaliy Romanov
Note: Match was played behind closed doors due to quarantine in Ukraine during COVID-19 pandemic.

13 June 2020 26	Zorya Luhansk	1–3	Dynamo Kyiv	Zaporizhia
17:00 EEST (UTC+03:00)	Yurchenko 54' (pen.); Mykhaylichenko (yellow card) 70'; Cvek (red card) 83'; Abu Hanna (yellow card) 90+3'; Cheberko (yellow card) 90+5'	Report	Kędziora (yellow card) 30'; Buyalskyi 71'; De Pena 75'; Popov (yellow card) 77'; Tsyhankov 90+6'	Stadium: Slavutych-Arena; Attendance: 0 Referee: Mykola Balakin
Note: Match was played behind closed doors due to quarantine in Ukraine during COVID-19 pandemic.

22 June 2020 27	Dynamo Kyiv	2–1	Kolos Kovalivka	Kyiv
19:30 EEST (UTC+03:00)	Tsitaishvili (yellow card) 19'; Popov (yellow card) 52'; Tsyhankov 64' (pen.); De Pena 87' (pen.)	Report	Milko (yellow card) 40'; Petrov (yellow card) 49' (yellow-red card) 62'; Yemets (yellow card) 61'; Vilhjálmsson 69' (pen.); Yefremov (yellow card) 86'	Stadium: NSC Olimpiyskiy; Attendance: 0 Referee: Serhiy Boyko
Note: Match was played behind closed doors due to quarantine in Ukraine during COVID-19 pandemic.

28 June 2020 28	Desna Chernihiv	3–2	Dynamo Kyiv	Chernihiv
19:30 EEST (UTC+03:00)	Kartushov 12', (yellow card) 27'; Kargbo 25' (o.g.); Ohirya (yellow card) 34'; Hitchenko 90+1'	Report	Tsyhankov 3', 86'; Shepelyev (yellow card) 28'; Shabanov (yellow card) 62'; Kadiri (yellow card) 90+3'	Stadium: Chernihiv Stadium; Attendance: 0 Referee: Kateryna Monzul
Note: Match was played behind closed doors due to quarantine in Ukraine during COVID-19 pandemic.

4 July 2020 29	Dynamo Kyiv	2–3	Shakhtar Donetsk	Kyiv
19:30 EEST (UTC+03:00)	Verbič 51'; Kadiri (yellow card) 63'; De Pena 67'; Pivarić (red card) 90+1'	Report	Solomon (yellow card) 17'; Stepanenko 31', (yellow card) 61'; Konoplyanka 39'; Bolbat (yellow card) 42'; Patrick 72'	Stadium: NSC Olimpiyskiy; Attendance: 0 Referee: Vitaliy Romanov
Note: Match was played behind closed doors due to quarantine in Ukraine during COVID-19 pandemic.

12 July 2020 30	FC Oleksandriya	2–2	Dynamo Kyiv	Oleksandriya
19:30 EEST (UTC+03:00)	Babohlo (yellow card) 8'; Tretyakov 23' (pen.), 89' (pen.); Kovalets (yellow card) 90'	Report	Syrota (yellow card) 1'; Sydorchuk (yellow card) 15'; Tsyhankov (yellow card) 49'; Verbič 64', 75'; Andriyevskyi (yellow card) 84'; Karavayev (yellow card) 90'	Stadium: CSC Nika Stadium; Attendance: 0 Referee: Vitaliy Romanov
Note: Match was played behind closed doors due to quarantine in Ukraine during COVID-19 pandemic.

16 July 2020 31	Dynamo Kyiv	3–1	Zorya Luhansk	Kyiv
19:00 EEST (UTC+03:00)	Tsyhankov 14', 34'; Sydorchuk 15', (yellow card) 41'; De Pena (yellow card) 59'	Report	Hromov 2'; Cheberko (yellow card) 11'; Vernydub (yellow card) 20'; Yurchenko (yellow card) 60'; Lunyov (yellow card) 87'; Abu Hanna (yellow card) 90+4'	Stadium: NSC Olimpiyskiy; Attendance: 0 Referee: Kateryna Monzul
Note: Match was played behind closed doors due to quarantine in Ukraine during COVID-19 pandemic.

19 July 2020 32	Kolos Kovalivka	2–0	Dynamo Kyiv	Kyiv
19:30 EEST (UTC+03:00)	Chornomorets (yellow card) 30'; Lysenko 54'; Vilhjálmsson 71' (pen.); Milko (yellow card) 84' (yellow-red card) 90+4'	Report	Shepelyev (yellow card) 74'; Kędziora (yellow card) 82'	Stadium: NSC Olimpiyskiy; Attendance: 0 Referee: Maksym Kozyryatskyi
Note: Match was played behind closed doors due to quarantine in Ukraine during COVID-19 pandemic.

=== Ukrainian Cup ===
30 October 2019 Round of 16 (1/8)	Dynamo Kyiv	2–1	Shakhtar Donetsk	Kyiv
19:30 EEST (UTC+03:00)	Sydorchuk 22', (yellow card) 89'; Mykolenko (yellow card) 71'; Kędziora (yellow card) 74'; Shepelyev (red card) 88'; Popov 110' de Pena (yellow card) 118'; Shabanov (yellow card) 120'; Harmash (yellow card) 120'	Report	Stepanenko (yellow card) 10' (yellow-red card) 94', (goal) 90+2'; Kovalenko (yellow card) 31'; Dodô (yellow card) 71'; Dentinho (yellow card) 109'; Taison (yellow card) 120'	Stadium: NSC Olimpiyskiy; Attendance: 34,865; Referee: Viktor Kopiyevskyi

11 March 2020 Quarterfinal	Dynamo Kyiv	1–0	FC Oleksandriya	Kyiv
19:30 EET (UTC+02:00)	Kadiri (yellow card) 45' (yellow-red card) 55'; Sydorchuk (yellow card) 55'; Popov (yellow card) 84'; Tsyhankov 106'	Report	Bukhal (yellow card) 58'; Dovhyi (yellow card) 74'; Miroshnichenko (yellow card) 105'; Hrechyshkin (yellow card) 120+3'; Shendrik (yellow card) 120+3'	Stadium: NSC Olimpiyskiy; Attendance: 9,567; Referee: Vitaliy Romanov

17 June 2020 Semifinal	FC Mynai	0–2	Dynamo Kyiv	Mynai
14:00 EEST (UTC+03:00)	Vahin (yellow card) 15'; Nuriyev (yellow card) 65'; Pynyashko (yellow card) 77'	Report	Duelund 9', 39'; Shepelyev (yellow card) 12'; Tsyhankov (yellow card) 77'; Andriyevskyi (yellow card) 90'; Mykolenko (yellow card) 90+3'	Stadium: Mynai Arena; Attendance: 0 Referee: Kateryna Monzul
Note: Match was played behind closed doors due to quarantine in Ukraine during COVID-19 pandemic.

8 July 2020 Final	Dynamo Kyiv	1–1 (8 – 7 p)	Vorskla Poltava	Kharkiv
21:30 EEST (UTC+03:00)	Syrota (yellow card) 9'; Verbič 28', (yellow card) 113'; Shabanov (yellow card) 80'; Buyalskyi (yellow card) 88'	Report	Stepanyuk 11'; Sklyar (yellow card) 41'; Perduta (yellow card) 105'	Stadium: OSC Metalist; Attendance: 0 Referee: Kateryna Monzul
	Penalties
	Verbič (penalty scored); Tsyhankov (penalty scored); Kędziora (penalty scored) de Pena (penalty scored); Andriyevskyi (penalty scored); Sydorchuk (penalty scored); Shaparenko (penalty scored); Mykolenko (penalty missed); Shabanov (penalty scored)		Puclin (penalty scored); Kane (penalty scored); Luizão (penalty scored); Opanasenko (penalty scored); Ndiaye (penalty scored); Chesnakov (penalty scored); Perduta (penalty scored); Sapay (penalty missed); Bayenko (penalty missed)
Note: Match was played behind closed doors due to quarantine in Ukraine during COVID-19 pandemic.

=== Ukrainian Super Cup ===
28 July 2019 Final	Dynamo Kyiv	2–1	Shakhtar Donetsk	Odesa
21:00 EEST (UTC+03:00)	Buyalskyi (yellow card) 45'; Kádár (yellow card) 72'; Burda 80'; Harmash 83'	Report	Khocholava (yellow card) 29'; Alan Patrick 45+2'	Stadium: Chornomorets Stadium; Attendance: 27,400; Referee: Vitaliy Romanov

=== UEFA Champions League ===
==== Third qualifying round ====
6 August 2019 First leg	Club Brugge (Belgium)	1–0	(Ukraine) Dynamo Kyiv	Bruges, Belgium
21:30 EEST (UTC+03:00)	Deli (yellow card) 20'; Vanaken 37' (pen.); Dennis (yellow card) 39'	Report	Harmash (yellow card) 41'; Kędziora (yellow card) 44'; Rodrigues (yellow card) 68'; Sydorchuk (yellow card) 79'; Kádár (yellow card) 82'	Stadium: Jan Breydel Stadium; Attendance: 27,018; Referee: Xavier Estrada Fernández (Spain)

13 August 2019 Second leg	Dynamo Kyiv (Ukraine)	3–3 (3–4 agg.)	(Belgium) Club Brugge	Kyiv
19:30 EEST (UTC+03:00)	Buyalskyi 6'; Shepelyev 50'; Mykolenko (yellow card) 55'; Kádár (yellow card) 57'; Burda (yellow card) 60' (yellow-red card) 82'; Mechele 90+2' (o.g.)	Report	Tau (yellow card) 9' (yellow-red card) 84'; Mata (yellow card) 22'; Deli 38'; Okereke (yellow card) 79'; Vanaken (yellow card) 86'; Vormer 88'; Openda 90+5', (yellow card) 90+6'	Stadium: NSC Olimpiyskiy; Attendance: 42,152; Referee: Ivan Bebek (Croatia)

=== UEFA Europa League ===
==== Group stage ====
Pos	Team	Pld	W	D	L	GF	GA	GD	Pts	Qualification	MAL	KOB	DKV	LUG
1	(Sweden) Malmö FF	6	3	2	1	8	6	+2	11	Advance to knockout phase	—	1–1	4–3	2–1
2	(Denmark) Copenhagen	6	2	3	1	5	4	+1	9	Advance to knockout phase	0–1	—	1–1	1–0
3	(Ukraine) Dynamo Kyiv	6	1	4	1	7	7	0	7		1–0	1–1	—	1–1
4	(Switzerland) Lugano	6	0	3	3	2	5	−3	3		0–0	0–1	0–0	—

Source: UEFA
Rules for classification: Group stage tiebreakers

19 September 2019 1	Dynamo Kyiv (Ukraine)	1–0	(Sweden) Malmö FF	Kyiv
20:00 EEST (UTC+03:00)	Verbič (yellow card) 51'; Buyalskyi 84'	Report	Christiansen (yellow card) 63'	Stadium: NSC Olimpiyskiy; Attendance: 17,159; Referee: Aleksandar Stavrev

3 October 2019 2	FC Lugano (Switzerland)	0–0	(Ukraine) Dynamo Kyiv	St. Gallen, Switzerland
22:00 EEST (UTC+03:00)	Yao (yellow card) 23'	Report	Kádár (yellow card) 35'; Shabanov (yellow card) 86'	Stadium: Kybunpark; Attendance: 1,281; Referee: Karim Abed

24 October 2019 3	Dynamo Kyiv (Ukraine)	1–1	(Denmark) Copenhagen	Kyiv
22:00 EEST (UTC+03:00)	Sydorchuk (yellow card) 22'; Verbič (yellow card) 46'; Shabanov 53'; Kędziora (yellow card) 55'; Besyedin (yellow card) 68'	Report	Sotiriou 2'; Stage (yellow card) 51'; Bartolec (yellow card) 59'	Stadium: NSC Olimpiyskiy; Attendance: 21,202; Referee: Halil Umut Meler

7 November 2019 4	Copenhagen (Denmark)	1–1	(Ukraine) Dynamo Kyiv	Copenhagen, Denmark
22:00 EET (UTC+02:00)	Stage 4'; Zeca (yellow card) 64'; Santos (yellow card) 83'; Nelsson (yellow card) 83'	Report	Verbič 70'; Shabanov (yellow card) 83'	Stadium: Parken Stadium; Attendance: 23,166; Referee: Tamás Bognár

28 November 2019 5	Malmö FF (Sweden)	4–3	(Ukraine) Dynamo Kyiv	Malmö, Sweden
22:00 EET (UTC+02:00)	Bengtsson 2'; Rosenberg 48', 90+6'; Rakip 57', (yellow card) 67'; Bachirou (yellow card) 76'	Report	Mykolenko 18'; Shepelyev (yellow card) 20'; Shabanov (yellow card) 23'; Sydorchuk (yellow card) 36' (yellow-red card) 65'; Tsyhankov 39'; Verbič (yellow card) 70', (goal) 77'; Shaparenko (yellow card) 90'; Besyedin (yellow card) 90+3'	Stadium: Stadion; Attendance: 19,224; Referee: Pavel Královec

12 December 2019 6	Dynamo Kyiv (Ukraine)	1–1	(Switzerland) FC Lugano	Kyiv
20:00 EET (UTC+02:00)	Tsyhankov 90+4'	Report	Guidotti (yellow card) 17'; Aratore 45'; Obexer (yellow card) 67'; Vécsei (yellow card) 79'; Da Costa (yellow card) 90'	Stadium: NSC Olimpiyskiy; Attendance: 15,774; Referee: Aliyar Aghayev (Azerbaijan)

== Statistics ==
=== Appearances and goals ===
No.	Pos	Nat	Player	Total		Premier League		Cup		Super Cup		UEFA CL		Europa League	
No.	Pos	Nat	Player	Apps	Goals	Apps	Goals	Apps	Goals	Apps	Goals	Apps	Goals	Apps	Goals
Goalkeepers
1	GK	(Ukraine) UKR	Heorhiy Bushchan	28	0	20	0	3	0	0	0	0	0	5	0
71	GK	(Ukraine) UKR	Denys Boyko	17	0	12	0	1	0	1	0	2	0	1	0
Defenders
4	DF	(Ukraine) UKR	Denys Popov	22	2	15+1	1	3	1	0	0	0	0	3	0
16	DF	(Ukraine) UKR	Vitaliy Mykolenko	36	4	23	3	3+1	0	1	0	2	0	6	1
23	MF	(Croatia) CRO	Josip Pivarić	3	0	1+1	0	1	0	0	0	0	0	0	0
26	DF	(Ukraine) UKR	Mykyta Burda	12	1	8+1	0	0	0	1	1	2	0	0	0
30	DF	(Ukraine) UKR	Artem Shabanov	35	3	25+1	2	4	0	0	0	0	0	5	1
34	DF	(Ukraine) UKR	Oleksandr Syrota	3	0	2	0	1	0	0	0	0	0	0	0
94	DF	(Poland) POL	Tomasz Kędziora	38	0	23+3	0	3	0	1	0	2	0	6	0
Midfielders
5	MF	(Ukraine) UKR	Serhiy Sydorchuk	35	2	22+3	1	3	1	0+1	0	1	0	5	0
6	MF	(Ghana) GHA	Mohammed Kadiri	16	0	9+6	0	1	0	0	0	0	0	0	0
7	MF	(Slovenia) SVN	Benjamin Verbič	37	14	16+9	11	4	1	1	0	2	0	5	2
8	MF	(Ukraine) UKR	Volodymyr Shepelyev	38	1	20+6	0	3+1	0	1	0	1	1	6	0
14	MF	(Uruguay) URU	Carlos de Pena	38	9	15+13	9	2+1	0	0+1	0	0+2	0	2+2	0
15	MF	(Ukraine) UKR	Viktor Tsyhankov	39	17	21+6	14	1+3	1	0	0	1+1	0	6	2
18	MF	(Ukraine) UKR	Oleksandr Andriyevskyi	11	0	5+2	0	1+2	0	0	0	1	0	0	0
20	MF	(Ukraine) UKR	Oleksandr Karavayev	37	0	20+8	0	3	0	1	0	1	0	2+2	0
22	MF	(Luxembourg) LUX	Gerson Rodrigues	12	2	6+2	2	0	0	0	0	1+1	0	2	0
29	MF	(Ukraine) UKR	Vitaliy Buyalskyi	37	11	23+4	9	2+1	0	1	0	2	1	4	1
70	MF	(Ukraine) UKR	Nazariy Rusyn	13	2	11+1	2	0+1	0	0	0	0	0	0	0
77	MF	(Nigeria) NGA	Olabiran Muyiwa	1	0	0+1	0	0	0	0	0	0	0	0	0
99	MF	(Denmark) DEN	Mikkel Duelund	9	2	2+6	0	1	2	0	0	0	0	0	0
Forwards
9	FW	(Spain) ESP	Fran Sol	17	1	6+7	1	2	0	0	0	0+1	0	0+1	0
10	FW	(Ukraine) UKR	Mykola Shaparenko	17	1	7+7	1	0+2	0	0	0	0	0	0+1	0
11	FW	(Ukraine) UKR	Heorhiy Tsitaishvili	13	0	6+4	0	1	0	0+1	0	0	0	0+1	0
33	FW	(Belgium) BEL	Ibrahim Kargbo Jr.	3	0	1+1	0	0+1	0	0	0	0	0	0	0
41	FW	(Ukraine) UKR	Artem Besyedin	23	8	9+4	8	1	0	1	0	1+1	0	4+2	0
Players transferred out during the season
19	MF	(Ukraine) UKR	Denys Harmash	20	1	10+3	0	0+1	0	1	1	1	0	0+4	0
44	DF	(Hungary) HUN	Tamás Kádár	20	0	12+1	0	0	0	1	0	2	0	4	0

Source: Competitions

Last updated: 19 July 2020

=== Goalscorers ===
Rank	No.	Pos	Nat	Name	Ukrainian Premier League	Ukrainian Cup	Ukrainian Super Cup	UEFA CL	Europa League	Total
1	15	MF	(Ukraine)	Viktor Tsyhankov	14	1	0	0	2	17
2	7	MF	(Slovenia)	Benjamin Verbič	11	1	0	0	2	14
3	29	MF	(Ukraine)	Vitaliy Buyalskyi	9	0	0	1	1	11
4	14	MF	(Uruguay)	Carlos de Pena	9	0	0	0	0	9
5	41	FW	(Ukraine)	Artem Besyedin	8	0	0	0	0	8
6	16	DF	(Ukraine)	Vitalii Mykolenko	3	0	0	0	1	4
7	30	DF	(Ukraine)	Artem Shabanov	2	0	0	0	1	3
8	4	DF	(Ukraine)	Denys Popov	1	1	0	0	0	2
8	5	MF	(Ukraine)	Serhiy Sydorchuk	1	1	0	0	0	2
8	22	MF	(Luxembourg)	Gerson Rodrigues	2	0	0	0	0	2
8	70	MF	(Ukraine)	Nazariy Rusyn	2	0	0	0	0	2
8	99	MF	(Denmark)	Mikkel Duelund	0	2	0	0	0	2
13	8	MF	(Ukraine)	Volodymyr Shepelyev	0	0	0	1	0	1
13	9	FW	(Spain)	Fran Sol	1	0	0	0	0	1
13	10	FW	(Ukraine)	Mykola Shaparenko	1	0	0	0	0	1
13	19	MF	(Ukraine)	Denys Harmash	0	0	1	0	0	1
13	26	DF	(Ukraine)	Mykyta Burda	0	0	1	0	0	1
				Own goal	1	0	0	1	0	2
				Total	65	6	2	3	7	83

Last updated: 19 July 2020

=== Clean sheets ===
Rank	No.	Pos	Nat	Name	Premier League	Cup	Super Cup	UEFA CL	Europa League	Total
1	1	GK	(Ukraine)	Heorhiy Bushchan	8	1	0	0	1	10
2	71	GK	(Ukraine)	Denys Boyko	3	1	0	0	1	5
				Total	11	2	0	0	2	15

Last updated: 19 July 2020

=== Disciplinary record ===
No.	Pos	Nat	Player	Premier League			Cup			Super Cup			UEFA CL			Europa League			Total		
No.	Pos	Nat	Player	Booked	(yellow card) (yellow-red card)	Sent off (straight red)	Booked	(yellow card) (yellow-red card)	Sent off (straight red)	Booked	(yellow card) (yellow-red card)	Sent off (straight red)	Booked	(yellow card) (yellow-red card)	Sent off (straight red)	Booked	(yellow card) (yellow-red card)	Sent off (straight red)	Booked	(yellow card) (yellow-red card)	Sent off (straight red)
1	GK	(Ukraine)	Heorhiy Bushchan	1	0	0	0	0	0	0	0	0	0	0	0	0	0	0	1	0	0
4	DF	(Ukraine)	Denys Popov	5	0	0	1	0	0	0	0	0	0	0	0	0	0	0	6	0	0
5	MF	(Ukraine)	Serhiy Sydorchuk	7	1	0	2	0	0	0	0	0	1	0	0	1	1	0	11	2	0
6	MF	(Ghana)	Mohammed Kadiri	4	0	0	0	1	0	0	0	0	0	0	0	0	0	0	4	1	0
7	MF	(Slovenia)	Benjamin Verbič	3	0	1	1	0	0	0	0	0	0	0	0	3	0	0	7	0	1
8	DF	(Ukraine)	Volodymyr Shepelyev	5	1	0	1	0	1	0	0	0	0	0	0	1	0	0	7	1	1
9	FW	(Spain)	Fran Sol	1	0	0	0	0	0	0	0	0	0	0	0	0	0	0	1	0	0
10	FW	(Ukraine)	Mykola Shaparenko	2	0	0	0	0	0	0	0	0	0	0	0	1	0	0	3	0	0
11	FW	(Ukraine)	Heorhiy Tsitaishvili	1	0	0	0	0	0	0	0	0	0	0	0	0	0	0	1	0	0
14	MF	(Uruguay)	Carlos de Pena	5	0	0	1	0	0	0	0	0	0	0	0	0	0	0	6	0	0
15	MF	(Ukraine)	Viktor Tsyhankov	3	0	0	1	0	0	0	0	0	0	0	0	0	0	0	4	0	0
16	DF	(Ukraine)	Vitalii Mykolenko	5	0	0	2	0	0	0	0	0	1	0	0	0	0	0	8	0	0
18	MF	(Ukraine)	Oleksandr Andriyevskyi	3	0	0	1	0	0	0	0	0	0	0	0	0	0	0	4	0	0
19	MF	(Ukraine)	Denys Harmash	3	0	0	1	0	0	0	0	0	1	0	0	0	0	0	5	0	0
20	MF	(Ukraine)	Oleksandr Karavayev	2	0	0	0	0	0	0	0	0	0	0	0	0	0	0	2	0	0
22	MF	(Luxembourg)	Gerson Rodrigues	1	0	0	0	0	0	0	0	0	1	0	0	0	0	0	2	0	0
23	DF	(Croatia)	Josip Pivarić	0	0	1	0	0	0	0	0	0	0	0	0	0	0	0	0	0	1
26	DF	(Ukraine)	Mykyta Burda	3	0	0	0	0	0	0	0	0	0	1	0	0	0	0	3	1	0
29	MF	(Ukraine)	Vitaliy Buyalskyi	1	0	1	1	0	0	1	0	0	0	0	0	0	0	0	3	0	1
30	DF	(Ukraine)	Artem Shabanov	4	0	0	2	0	0	0	0	0	0	0	0	3	0	0	9	0	0
34	DF	(Ukraine)	Oleksandr Syrota	1	0	0	1	0	0	0	0	0	0	0	0	0	0	0	2	0	0
41	FW	(Ukraine)	Artem Besyedin	6	0	0	0	0	0	0	0	0	0	0	0	2	0	0	8	0	0
44	DF	(Hungary)	Tamás Kádár	2	1	0	0	0	0	1	0	0	2	0	0	1	0	0	6	1	0
70	MF	(Ukraine)	Nazariy Rusyn	1	0	0	0	0	0	0	0	0	0	0	0	0	0	0	1	0	0
71	GK	(Ukraine)	Denys Boyko	1	0	0	0	0	0	0	0	0	0	0	0	0	0	0	1	0	0
94	DF	(Poland)	Tomasz Kędziora	3	0	0	1	0	0	0	0	0	1	0	0	1	0	0	6	0	0
			Total	73	3	3	16	1	1	2	0	0	7	1	0	13	1	0	110	6	4

Last updated: 19 July 2020

=== Attendances ===
	Matches	Attendances	Average	High	Low
Premier League	16	141,468	8,841	41,203	0
Cup	2	44,432	22,216	34,865	9,567
Champions League	1	42,152	42,152	42,152	42,152
Europa League	3	54,135	18,045	21,202	15,774
Total	22	282,187	22,813	42,152	0

Last updated: 19 July 2020
