= Ibrahim Kargbo Jr. =

Belgian footballer

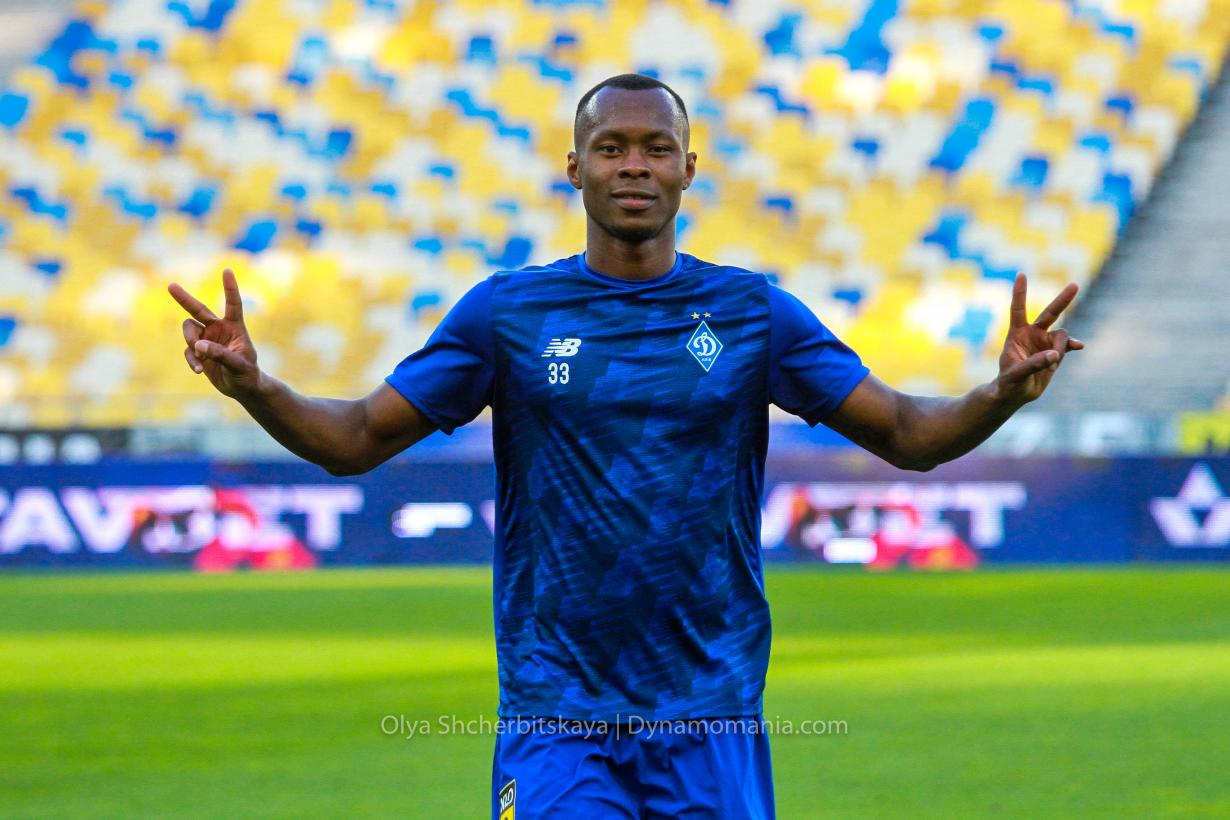

Personal information
- Date of birth: 3 January 2000 (age 26)
- Place of birth: Freetown, Sierra Leone
- Height: 1.90 m (6 ft 3 in)
- Position: Striker

Team information
- Current team: Prishtina e Re
- Number: 89

Youth career
- Beerschot
- Reading
- 2016–2018: Crystal Palace

Senior career*
Years	Team	Apps	(Gls)
2018–2019	Roeselare	13	(0)
2019	→ Lierse Kempenzonen (loan)	10	(2)
2020–2022	Dynamo Kyiv	2	(0)
2020–2021	→ Olimpik Donetsk (loan)	20	(3)
2022	→ Celje (loan)	0	(0)
2022	→ Doxa Katokopias (loan)	7	(0)
2023	Celje	7	(0)
2023	Solin	7	(2)
2024	Dnepr Mogilev	10	(0)
2024	Jedinstvo Ub	7	(0)
2025	BATE Borisov	23	(1)
2026–	Prishtina e Re	16	(6)

International career
2017–2018	Belgium U18	5	(1)
2018–2019	Belgium U19	7	(1)
- * Club domestic league appearances and goals as of 22 June 2026

Ibrahim Kargbo Jr. (born 3 January 2000) is a professional footballer who plays as a striker for Prishtina e Re. Born in Sierra Leone, Kargbo represented Belgium at youth international level.

== Early life ==
Born in Sierra Leone, Kargbo moved to Belgium at the age of 8 with his father, Ibrahim Kargbo.

== Club career ==
Kargbo played youth football for Beerschot, Reading and Crystal Palace, before signing for Roeselare of the Belgian First Division B in January 2018. He moved on loan to Lierse Kempenzonen in August 2019.

In December 2019, Kargbo signed for Ukrainian club Dynamo Kyiv. In August 2020, he moved on loan to Olimpik Donetsk. In January 2022, Kargbo was loaned to Slovenian PrvaLiga side Celje; however, his contract was terminated just one month later.

In August 2022, Kargbo was loaned to Cypriot club Doxa Katokopias. After half a season in Cyprus, where he made seven league appearances, he returned to Slovenia and signed with Celje on a permanent deal.

In March 2025, Kargbo returned to Belarus, joining BATE Borisov.

== International career ==
Kargbo represented Belgium internationally at under-18 and under-19 levels.

== Career statistics ==
As of 4 January 2023

Appearances and goals by club, season and competition
Club	Season	League		National cup		Other		Total	
Club	Season	Apps	Goals	Apps	Goals	Apps	Goals	Apps	Goals
Roeselare	2017–18	2	0	0	0	0	0	2	0
Roeselare	2018–19	8	0	1	0	0	0	9	0
Roeselare	2019–20	3	0	0	0	0	0	3	0
Roeselare	Total	13	0	1	0	0	0	14	0
Lierse Kempenzonen (loan)	2019–20	10	2	0	0	0	0	10	2
Dynamo Kyiv	2019–20	2	0	1	0	0	0	3	0
Dynamo Kyiv	2020–21	0	0	0	0	0	0	0	0
Dynamo Kyiv	2021–22	0	0	0	0	0	0	0	0
Dynamo Kyiv	2022–23	0	0	0	0	0	0	0	0
Dynamo Kyiv	Total	2	0	1	0	0	0	3	0
Olimpik Donetsk (loan)	2020–21	20	3	1	0	0	0	21	3
Celje (loan)	2021–22	0	0	0	0	0	0	0	0
Doxa Katokopias (loan)	2022–23	7	0	0	0	0	0	7	0
Career total		52	5	3	0	0	0	55	5
