= O Desertor das Letras =

1774 poem by Manuel Inácio da Silva Alvarenga

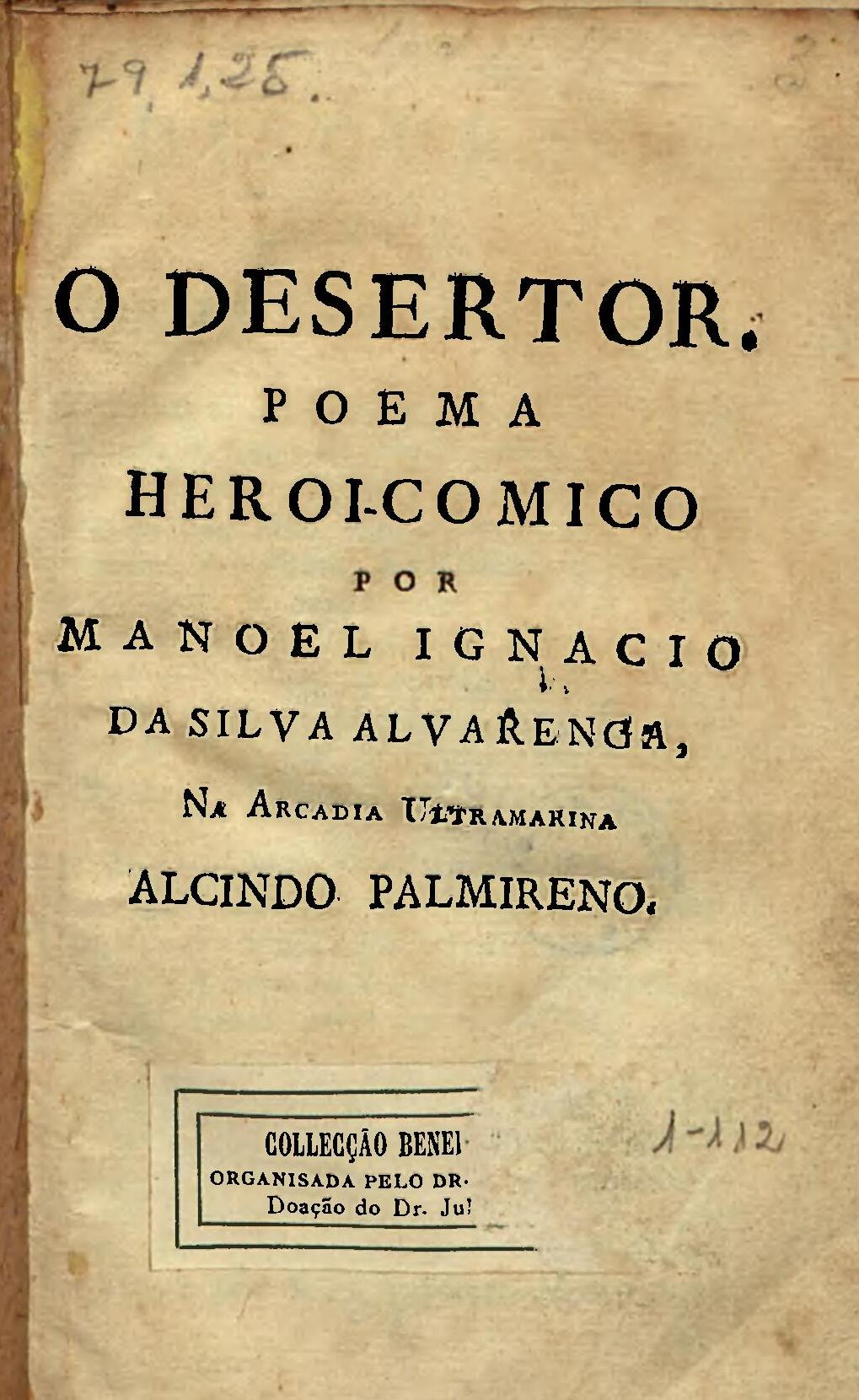
- Title page of first edition
- Author: Manuel Inácio da Silva Alvarenga
- Language: Brazilian Portuguese
- Genre: Mock-heroic poem
- Publication date: 1774
- Publication place: Brazil

O Desertor das Letras ("The Desertor of Letters") is a mock-heroic narrative poem by Colonial Brazilian author Silva Alvarenga, published in 1774.
