= Temur Chogadze =

Georgian association football player

Personal information
- Date of birth: 5 May 1998 (age 28)
- Place of birth: Batumi, Georgia
- Height: 1.77 m (5 ft 9 1/2 in)
- Position: Midfielder

Youth career
- 200?–2014: Saburtalo Tbilisi

Senior career*
| Years | Team | Apps | (Gls) |
| 2014–2018 | Saburtalo Tbilisi | 8 | (1) |
| 2017 | → Dinamo Batumi (loan) | 15 | (0) |
| 2018–2020 | Rustavi | 38 | (4) |
| 2019 | → Torpedo Kutaisi (loan) | 12 | (1) |
| 2020–2021 | Olimpik Donetsk | 19 | (0) |
| 2021 | Inhulets Petrove | 0 | (0) |
| 2021 | Telavi | 8 | (1) |
| 2022 | Gagra | 19 | (1) |
| 2022–2023 | Shakhter Karagandy | 35 | (9) |
| 2024 | Nasaf | 10 | (0) |
| 2024 | Zhetysu | 8 | (1) |
| 2025 | Kauno Žalgiris | 30 | (5) |

International career^{‡}
| 2016–2017 | Georgia U19 | 6 | (0) |
| 2019 | Georgia U21 | 2 | (0) |
- * Club domestic league appearances and goals as of 20 November 2025 ‡ National team caps and goals as of 25 May 2021

Temur Chogadze (Georgian: თემურ ჩოგაძე; born 5 May 1998) is a Georgian professional footballer who plays as a midfielder.

== Clubs ==
Born in Batumi, Chogadze is a product of a youth sportive system of the Saburtalo Tbilisi, where he signed his first professional contract. After playing in the different Erovnuli Liga teams, in January 2020 he was transferred to Ukraine and signed a 1,5 year deal with Olimpik Donetsk.

Chogadze made his debut in the Ukrainian Premier League for FC Olimpik as a start-squad player on 23 February 2020, playing in a losing home match against FC Lviv. In 2022, he moved to Kazakhstan to play for Shakhter. Following a brief tenure at Nasaf in Uzbekistan, in the summer of 2024 Chogadze returned to KPL and signed for Zhetysu.

On 13 January 2025 he signed with Lithuanian Kauno Žalgiris Club. On 20 November announced that Chogadze left club.
