= Marcos Urbina =

Mexican footballer (born 1985)

Personal information
- Full name: Marcos Urbina Blancas
- Date of birth: 15 April 1985 (age 41)
- Place of birth: Los Reyes, Michoacán, Mexico
- Height: 1.73 m (5 ft 8 in)
- Position: Defender

Senior career*
Years	Team	Apps	(Gls)
2005	Mérida		
2006–2012	Morelia	5	(0)
2008–2009	→ Mérida (loan)	24	(0)
2009–2010	→ Atlante Tabasco (loan)		
- * Club domestic league appearances and goals

Marcos Urbina Blancas (born 15 April 1985) is a Mexican former football defender.

He made his debut with Morelia on 18 February 2006, as Monarcas defeated Tecos UAG by a score of 3–1.
