= Vladyslav Khamelyuk =

Ukrainian footballer

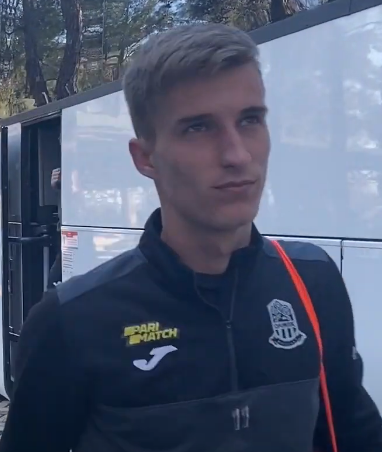
- Khamelyuk in 2021 with Olimpik Donetsk

Personal information
- Full name: Vladyslav Ruslanovych Khamelyuk
- Date of birth: 4 November 1998 (age 28)
- Place of birth: Kamianets-Podilskyi, Ukraine
- Height: 1.78 m (5 ft 10 in)
- Position: Midfielder

Team information
- Current team: Viktoriya Sumy
- Number: 6

Youth career
- 2007–2011: DYuSSh-2 Kamianets-Podilskyi
- 2011–2013: Skala Morshyn
- 2014–2015: Metalurh Zaporizhya

Senior career*
Years	Team	Apps	(Gls)
2015	Metalurh Zaporizhzhia	0	(0)
2016–2020	Chornomorets Odesa	44	(2)
2021	Olimpik Donetsk	4	(1)
2021	Lviv	2	(0)
2022	Dynamo Brest	0	(0)
2022	Jonava	12	(1)
2022–2023	LNZ Cherkasy	21	(2)
2024–2025	Bukovyna Chernivtsi	24	(0)
2025–	Viktoriya Sumy	27	(4)

International career^{‡}
2017	Ukraine U19	2	(0)
- * Club domestic league appearances and goals as of 4 June 2026 ‡ National team caps and goals as of 29 June 2021

Vladyslav Ruslanovych Khamelyuk (Ukrainian: Владислав Русланович Хамелюк; born 4 May 1998) is a Ukrainian professional football player who plays for Viktoriya Sumy.

== Club career ==
He made his Ukrainian Premier League debut for FC Chornomorets Odesa on 17 March 2018 in a game against FC Stal Kamianske.

On 9 February 2022 Khamelyuk signed with Dynamo Brest in Belarus. In early March 2022 the player terminated contract, before playing any official matches.
