= Manuel Inácio da Silva Alvarenga =

Brazilian poet (1749–1814)

- Born: 1749; Ouro Preto
- Died: 1814 (aged 64–65); Rio de Janeiro
- Education: University of Coimbra
- Writing career
- Language: Portuguese

Manuel Inácio da Silva Alvarenga (1749–1814) was a Brazilian poet. He had a life-long commitment to life-long learning and promoting civic values and educational reforms. Silva Alvarenga edited one of the first newspapers in Brazil, O Patriota.

== Biography ==
=== Early life ===
Silva Alvarenga was born out of wedlock in Ouro Preto and was biracial. His mother was African and his father an "indigent white musician." He was raised in Minas Gerais.

=== Education ===
In the early 1770s, he studied in Rio de Janeiro. Silva Alvarenga was able to attend the University of Coimbra in Portugal in 1776 where he studied law. His father's friends encouraged his poetry and musical talents. After studying in Portugal, he moved back to Brazil, where he was part of the Ouro Preto Arcady. In 1782, he moved to Rio de Janeiro where he taught rhetoric and poetics in the position of Royal Professor.

=== Career ===
He became a founding member of the Sociedade Literária do Rio de Janeiro (Literary Society in Rio de Janeiro) in 1786. The society discussed issues ranging from the French Revolution to religion, where some members challenged religious dogma and claimed that miracles did not exist. Because the society was considered "subversive" he was imprisoned from 1794 to 1797. He died in Rio de Janeiro in 1814.

== Poetry ==
Silva Alvarenga's poetry follows European Neoclassical aesthetics of the eighteenth century and is considered an Arcadian poet. His work is compared to Tomás António Gonzaga and Cláudio Manuel da Costa. Silva Alvarenga, along with other Brazilian Arcadians, have been credited with planting "the roots of a literary culture in a systematic sense" in Brazil.

He was unique among contemporary Brazilian poets in using Brazil's own natural landscape in his work. He rarely included Africans in his own poetry and when he did, his depictions were considered negative by today's standards. Despite his personal background as a person of color, Silva Alvarenga, like many in his time, believed that black people were not "suitable subjects for poetry."

O Desetor das Letras is a satire based on university reforms of 1772.

His series of work, Glaura: poemas eroticos was originally published in Lisbon. Many of the poems are very much part of the pastoral Arcady tradition, however, literary critics have identified "elements which foreshadow Brazilian Romanticism."

- O Desertor das Letras (1774) - heroic-comic poem
- Glaura (1799) – erotic poems
