= Geo Danny Ekra =

Ivorian footballer

Personal information
- Full name: Geo Christ Danny Ekra
- Date of birth: 10 January 1999 (age 27)
- Place of birth: Abidjan, Ivory Coast
- Height: 1.84 m (6 ft 0 in)
- Position: Midfielder

Team information
- Current team: Kaisar
- Number: 55

Senior career*
Years	Team	Apps	(Gls)
2018	Saxan	10	(4)
2019	Artsakh	4	(0)
2020	Tambov	0	(0)
2021	Olimpik Donetsk	2	(0)
2021–2022	Akron Tolyatti	9	(0)
2023–	Kaisar	12	(0)
- * Club domestic league appearances and goals as of 19 November 2023

Geo Christ Danny Ekra (born 10 January 1999) is an Ivorian football player for Kaisar.

== Club career ==
He made his debut in the Russian Football National League for FC Akron Tolyatti on 25 September 2021 in a game against FC Torpedo Moscow.
