= Ihor Snurnitsyn =

Ukrainian footballer

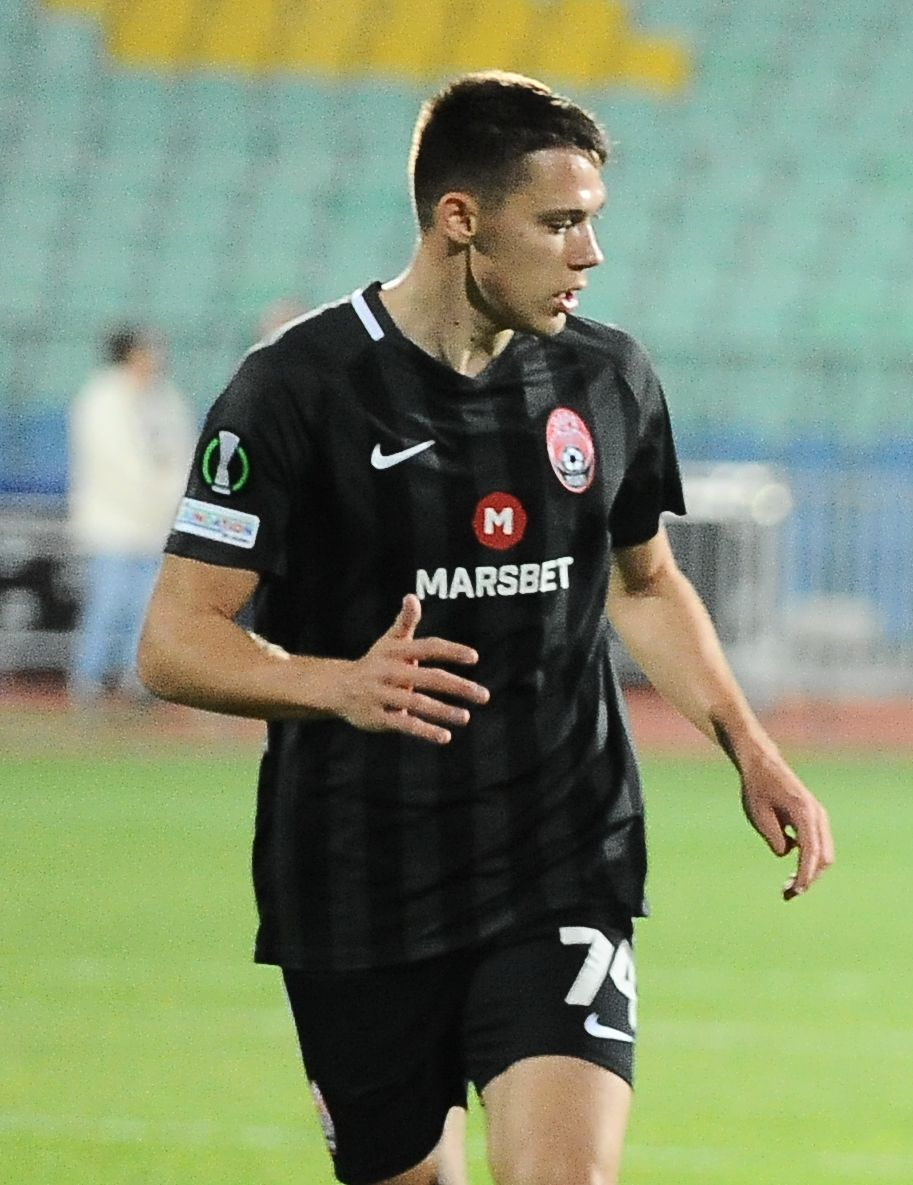

Personal information
- Full name: Ihor Serhiyovych Snurnitsyn
- Date of birth: 7 March 2000 (age 26)
- Place of birth: Dokuchaievsk, Ukraine
- Height: 1.78 m (5 ft 10 in)
- Position: Centre-back

Team information
- Current team: Metalist 1925 Kharkiv
- Number: 74

Youth career
- 2013–2014: Olimpik Donetsk
- 2014–2016: Torpedo Mykolaiv

Senior career*
Years	Team	Apps	(Gls)
2016–2021	Olimpik Donetsk	47	(0)
2021–2024	Zorya Luhansk	37	(0)
2024	Kryvbas Kryvyi Rih	0	(0)
2024–26	Metalist 1925 Kharkiv	14	(0)
2026 -	FC Nyva Ternopil	10	(1)

International career^{‡}
2016	Ukraine U16	3	(0)
2016–2017	Ukraine U17	9	(1)
2017	Ukraine U18	1	(0)
2018–2019	Ukraine U19	13	(1)
2018–2019	Ukraine U20	2	(0)
2020–2021	Ukraine U21	4	(0)
Medal record
Men's football
Representing Ukraine
UEFA European Under-19 Championship
Bronze medal – third place	2018 Finland
FIFA U-20 World Cup
Winner	2019 Poland
- * Club domestic league appearances and goals as of 10 June 2025 ‡ National team caps and goals as of 13 August 2022

Ihor Serhiyovych Snurnitsyn (Ukrainian: Ігор Сергійович Снурніцин; born 7 March 2000) is a Ukrainian professional footballer who plays as a centre-back for Metalist 1925 Kharkiv.

== Club career ==
He made his Ukrainian Premier League debut for FC Olimpik Donetsk on 15 April 2018 in a game against FC Oleksandriya.

On 22 August 2024, Snurnitsyn signed a two-year contract with Metalist 1925 Kharkiv.

== International ==
He represented Ukraine at the 2017 UEFA European Under-17 Championship, Ukraine did not advance from the group stage.

He also appeared in one group-stage game at the 2018 UEFA European Under-19 Championship as Ukraine reached the semifinals. On June 15, 2019 Snurnitsyn won the FIFA U-20 World Cup, being in the squad of Ukraine national U-20 team.

== Honours ==
=== International ===
==== Ukraine U20 ====
- FIFA U-20 World Cup: 2019
