= Carlo Urbina =

Italian painter

Carlo Urbina or Urbini (16th century) was an Italian painter, active in Crema. He painted for the town-hall, and for churches of Milan, including the ceilings of one of the transepts of Santa Maria della Passione. The Brera has a Baptism of Christ by him.

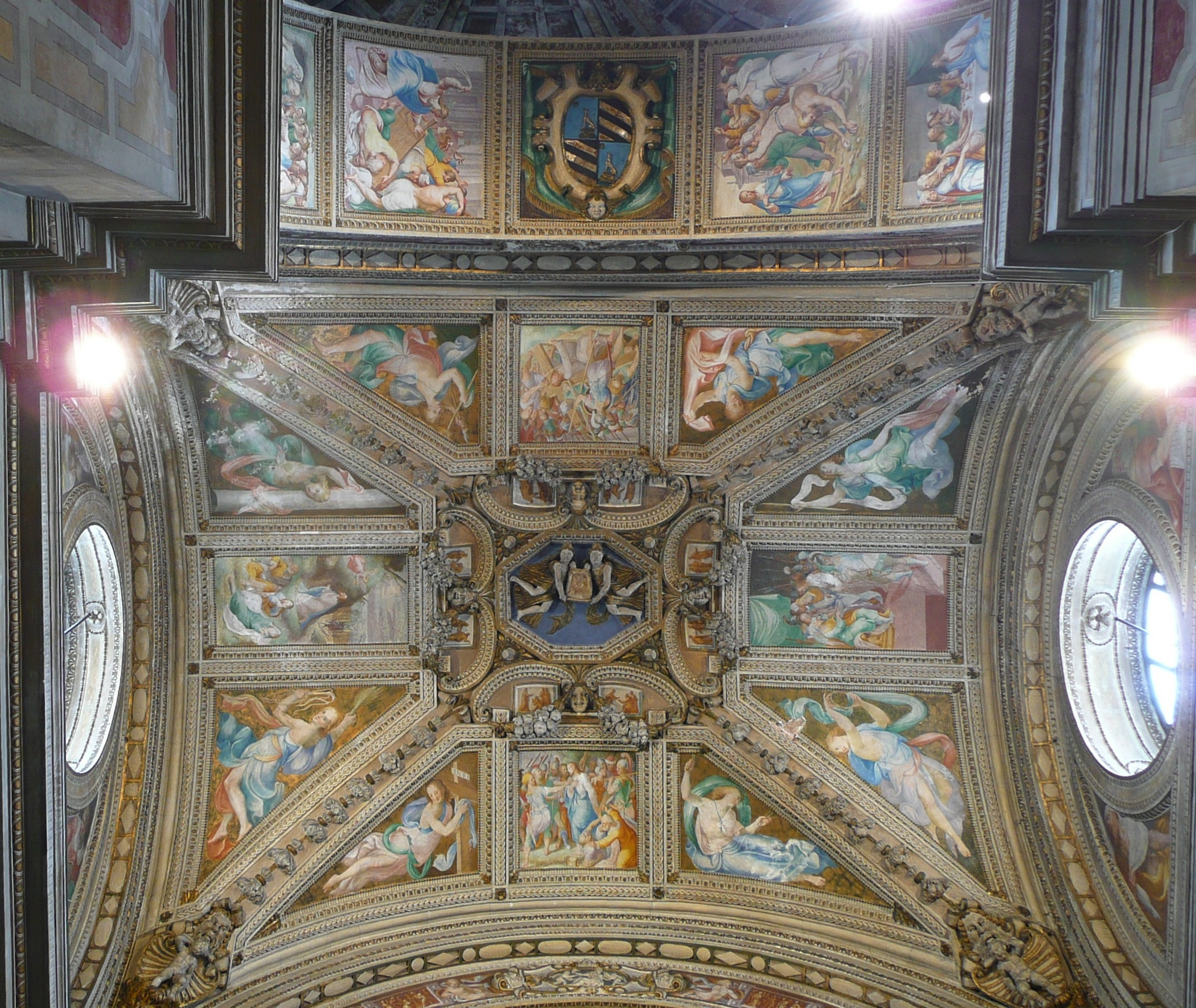
Ceiling at Santa Maria della Passione.
