= Olabiran Muyiwa =

Footballer (born 1998)

Benito
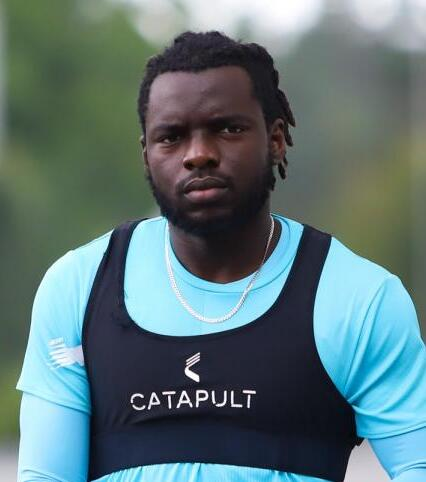

Personal information
- Full name: Olabiran Blessing Muyiwa
- Date of birth: 7 September 1998 (age 28)
- Place of birth: Abidjan, Ivory Coast
- Height: 1.79 m (5 ft 10 in)
- Positions: Midfielder; forward

Team information
- Current team: Kapaz

Senior career*
Years	Team	Apps	(Gls)
2017	Saxan Gagauz Yeri	10	(1)
2017	Lokomotiv Tashkent	5	(1)
2018	Luch Minsk	5	(0)
2018–2019	Tambov	33	(3)
2020–2025	Dynamo Kyiv	30	(3)
2020–2021	→ Olimpik Donetsk (loan)	18	(3)
2021–2022	→ HNK Gorica (loan)	4	(0)
2024	→ Zorya Luhansk (loan)	7	(0)
2025–2026	Akritas Chlorakas	10	(0)
2026–	Kapaz	0	(0)

International career^{‡}
2019	Nigeria U23	1	(0)
- * Club domestic league appearances and goals as of 11 August 2026 ‡ National team caps and goals as of 22 September 2022

Olabiran Blessing Muyiwa (born 7 September 1998), known as Benito, is a professional footballer who plays as a midfielder and forward for Azerbaijan Premier League club Kapaz. Born in Ivory Coast, he represents Nigeria at youth level.

== Club career ==
Benito was released by Russian Premier League club FC Tambov on 1 January 2020, signing a 3.5-year contract with Dynamo Kyiv on 3 January 2020.

On 11 August 2026, Azerbaijan Premier League club Kapaz announced the signing of Benito.
