= Abraham Alvarenga Urbina =

Honduran lawyer and politician

Abraham Alvarenga Urbina (born July 7, 1974) is a Honduran lawyer and politician. A member of the National Party of Honduras, he represented the Lempira Department and was a deputy of the National Congress of Honduras for 2006–2010.
