= Pavlo Lukyanchuk =

Ukrainian footballer

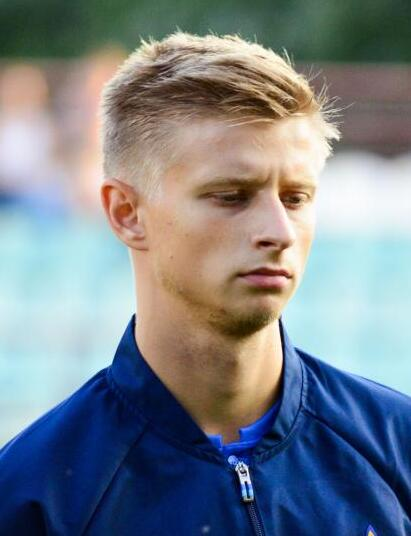

Personal information
- Full name: Pavlo Olehovych Lukyanchuk
- Date of birth: 19 May 1996 (age 30)
- Place of birth: Zaporizhzhia, Ukraine
- Height: 1.80 m (5 ft 11 in)
- Position: Defender

Team information
- Current team: Lokomotiv Kyiv
- Number: 16

Youth career
- 2009–2011: Metalurh Zaporizhzhia
- 2011–2012: Dynamo Kyiv

Senior career*
Years	Team	Apps	(Gls)
2013–2019	Dynamo Kyiv	0	(0)
2017	→ Olimpik Donetsk (loan)	10	(0)
2018	→ Veres Rivne (loan)	7	(0)
2018–2019	→ Kisvárda (loan)	13	(1)
2019–2020	Olimpik Donetsk	12	(1)
2020–2024	Obolon Kyiv	70	(2)
2022	→ GKS Wikielec (loan)	8	(0)
2025	UCSA Tarasivka	4	(0)
2025–	Lokomotiv Kyiv	7	(1)

International career
2012	Ukraine U16	4	(1)
2012–2013	Ukraine U17	13	(1)
2013–2014	Ukraine U18	5	(0)
2013–2015	Ukraine U19	22	(1)
2015–2016	Ukraine U20	2	(0)
2016–2018	Ukraine U21	16	(0)
- * Club domestic league appearances and goals as of 6 June 2026

Pavlo Olehovych Lukyanchuk (Ukrainian: Павло Олегович Лук'янчук; born 19 May 1996) is a Ukrainian professional footballer who plays as a defender for Lokomotiv Kyiv.

== Club career ==
Born in Zaporizhya, Lukyanchuk is a product of the Metalurh Zaporizhya's and Dynamo Kyiv's sportive schools. His first trainer was Mykola Senovalov.

He played for Dynamo in the Ukrainian Premier League Reserves, and in July 2017 he went on a half-year loan to Olimpik Donetsk in the Ukrainian Premier League. He made his top-flight debut for Olimpik on 16 July 2017 in a match against Oleksandriya.

== International career ==
He was called up to the senior Ukraine squad for friendlies against Morocco and Albania in May 2018.
