= Fabricio Alvarenga =

Argentine footballer (born 1996)

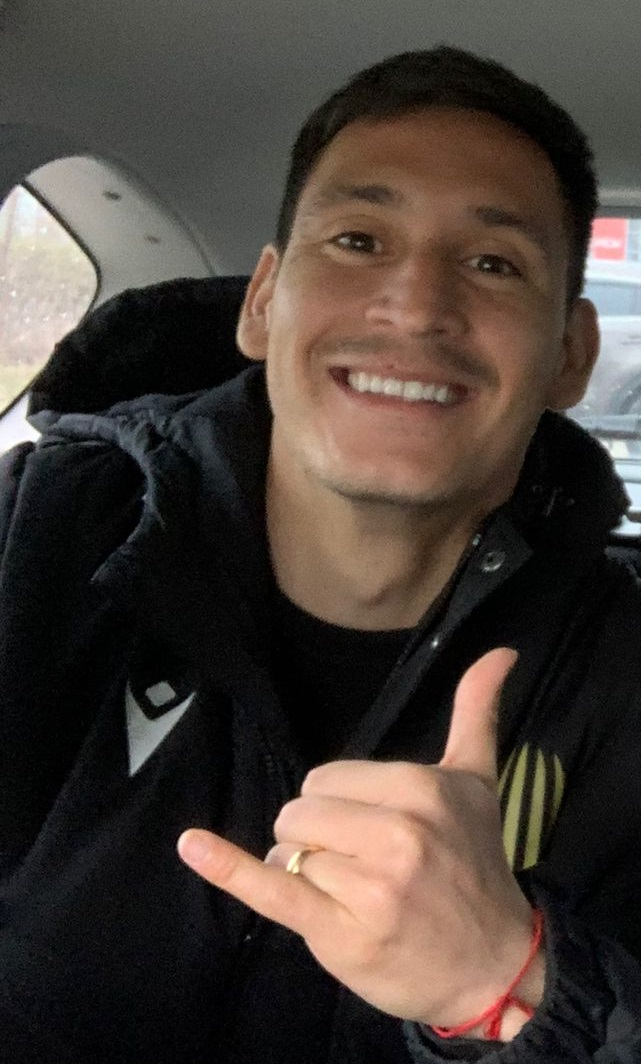
- Alvarenga in Lyiv

Personal information
- Full name: Fabricio Oscar Alvarenga
- Date of birth: 17 January 1996 (age 30)
- Place of birth: Aristóbulo del Valle, Misiones, Argentina
- Height: 1.78 m (5 ft 10 in)
- Position: Right winger

Youth career
- Vélez Sarsfield

Senior career*
Years	Team	Apps	(Gls)
2015–2020	Vélez Sarsfield	43	(2)
2018	→ Coritiba (loan)	5	(0)
2019–2020	→ Deportivo Morón (loan)	27	(3)
2020–2021	Olimpik Donetsk	15	(1)
2021–2023	Rukh Lviv	28	(1)
2024	Chornomorets Odesa	8	(0)
- * Club domestic league appearances and goals as of 02 August 2024

Fabricio Oscar Alvarenga (born 17 January 1996) is an Argentine professional footballer who played as a right winger for Chornomorets Odesa.
