= 2018–19 FC Mariupol season =

FC Mariupol
2018-19 season
- President: Tarik Makhmud Chaudri
- Manager: Oleksandr Babych
- Stadium: Volodymyr Boiko Stadium
- Ukrainian Premier League: 4th
- Ukrainian Cup: Round of 16 (1/8)
- UEFA Europa League: 3Q
- Top goalscorer: League: Oleksandr Zubkov (8); All: Oleksandr Zubkov (8)
Home colours	Away colours

The 2018–19 season was 19th season in the top Ukrainian football league for FC Mariupol. Mariupol competed in Premier League, Ukrainian Cup and UEFA Europa League.

== Players ==
=== Squad information ===
As of 31 May 2019

Squad no.	Name	Nationality	Position	Date of birth (age)
Goalkeepers
1	Yevhen Halchuk	(Ukraine)	GK	5 March 1992 (aged 27)
12	Rustam Khudzhamov (Captain)	(Ukraine)	GK	5 October 1982 (aged 36)
33	Artem Pospelov ^{List B}	(Ukraine)	GK	11 January 1998 (aged 21)
55	Yevhen Hrytsenko (on loan from Shakhtar Donetsk)	(Ukraine)	GK	5 February 1993 (aged 26)
Defenders
2	Oleksiy Bykov ^{List B}	(Ukraine)	DF	29 March 1998 (aged 21)
4	Serhiy Chobotenko ^{List B} (on loan from Shakhtar Donetsk)	(Ukraine)	DF	16 January 1997 (aged 22)
5	Joyskim Dawa	(Cameroon) (France)	DF	9 April 1996 (aged 23)
13	Serhiy Yavorskyi	(Ukraine)	DF	5 July 1989 (aged 29)
23	Besir Demiri	(Albania) (North Macedonia)	DF	1 August 1994 (aged 24)
29	Ihor Kyryukhantsev (on loan from Shakhtar Donetsk)	(Ukraine)	DF	29 January 1996 (aged 23)
Midfielders
6	Yevheniy Bilokin ^{List B}	(Ukraine)	MF	16 June 1998 (aged 20)
8	Pavlo Polehenko	(Ukraine)	MF	6 January 1995 (aged 24)
9	Dmytro Myshnyov	(Ukraine)	MF	26 January 1994 (aged 25)
11	Vyacheslav Churko (on loan from Shakhtar Donetsk)	(Ukraine) (Hungary)	MF	10 May 1993 (aged 26)
17	Serhiy Horbunov	(Ukraine)	MF	14 March 1994 (aged 25)
19	Ihor Tyschenko	(Ukraine)	MF	11 May 1989 (aged 30)
21	Danylo Litovchenko ^{List B}	(Ukraine)	MF	21 July 2000 (aged 18)
22	Oleksandr Zubkov ^{List B} (on loan from Shakhtar Donetsk)	(Ukraine)	MF	3 August 1996 (aged 22)
25	Valeriy Fedorchuk	(Ukraine)	MF	5 October 1988 (aged 30)
27	Ivan Mochevinskyi ^{List B}	(Ukraine)	MF	30 March 1998 (aged 21)
28	Andriy Korobenko ^{List B} (on loan from Shakhtar Donetsk)	(Ukraine)	MF	28 May 1997 (aged 22)
34	Mykyta Peterman ^{List B}	(Ukraine)	MF	12 June 1999 (aged 19)
70	Yevhen Prodanov ^{List B}	(Ukraine)	MF	24 January 1998 (aged 21)
76	Oleksandr Pikhalyonok ^{List B} (on loan from Shakhtar Donetsk)	(Ukraine)	MF	7 May 1997 (aged 22)
97	Danylo Ihnatenko ^{List B} (on loan from Shakhtar Donetsk)	(Ukraine)	MF	13 March 1997 (aged 22)
98	Illya Putrya ^{List B}	(Ukraine)	MF	15 May 1998 (aged 21)
Forwards
7	Andriy Boryachuk (on loan from Shakhtar Donetsk)	(Ukraine)	FW	23 April 1996 (aged 23)
14	Danylo Sikan ^{List B} (on loan from Shakhtar Donetsk)	(Ukraine)	FW	16 April 2001 (aged 18)
77	Vladyslav Buhay ^{List B} (on loan from Shakhtar Donetsk)	(Ukraine)	FW	27 October 1997 (aged 21)
86	Ruslan Fomin	(Ukraine)	FW	2 March 1986 (aged 33)
99	Vladyslav Vakula ^{List B}	(Ukraine)	FW	29 April 1999 (aged 20)

== Transfers ==
=== In ===
Date	Pos.	Player	Age	Moving from	Type	Fee	Source
Summer
18 June 2018	MF	(Ukraine) Pavlo Polehenko	23	(Ukraine) Zirka Kropyvnytskyi	Transfer	Free	
18 June 2018	FW	(Ukraine) Vladyslav Vakula	19	(Ukraine) Stal Kamianske	Transfer	Undisclosed	
8 July 2018	FW	(Ukraine) Ruslan Fomin	32	(Ukraine) Shakhtar Donetsk	Transfer	Free	
20 July 2018	MF	(Ukraine) Ihor Bykovskyi	21	Unattached	Transfer	Free	
13 August 2018	MF	(Ukraine) Valeriy Fedorchuk	29	(Latvia) Riga	Transfer	Free	
30 August 2018	MF	(Ukraine) Kyrylo Matveyev	22	(Ukraine) Arsenal Kyiv	Transfer	Free	
28 June 2018	GK	(Ukraine) Yevhen Hrytsenko	23	(Ukraine) Shakhtar Donetsk	Loan		
28 June 2018	DF	(Ukraine) Serhiy Chobotenko	21	(Ukraine) Shakhtar Donetsk	Loan		
31 August 2018	MF	(Ukraine) Oleksandr Zubkov	22	(Ukraine) Shakhtar Donetsk	Loan		
Winter
31 February 2019	FW	(Ukraine) Danylo Sikan	17	(Ukraine) Shakhtar Donetsk	Loan		

=== Out ===
Date	Pos.	Player	Age	Moving to	Type	Fee	Source
Summer
31 May 2018	MF	(Senegal) Roger Gomis	23	Unattached	Transfer	Free	
4 June 2018	MF	(Ukraine) Denys Dedechko	30	(Russia) SKA-Khabarovsk	Transfer	Free	
13 June 2018	DF	(Ukraine) Yevhen Neplyakh	26	(Ukraine) Volyn Lutsk	Transfer	Free	
5 July 2018	FW	(Ukraine) Anatoliy Didenko	35	(Ukraine) Chornomorets Odesa	Transfer	Free	
18 July 2018	GK	(Ukraine) Ihor Levchenko	27	(Finland) IFK Mariehamn	Transfer	Free	
20 July 2018	DF	(Ukraine) Oleksandr Nasonov	26	(Ukraine) Arsenal Kyiv	Transfer	Free	
31 May 2018	MF	(Ukraine) Serhiy Bolbat	24	(Ukraine) Shakhtar Donetsk	Loan return		
31 May 2018	MF	(Ukraine) Andriy Totovytskyi	25	(Ukraine) Shakhtar Donetsk	Loan return		
31 May 2018	FW	(Ukraine) Denys Arendaruk	22	(Ukraine) Shakhtar Donetsk	Loan return		
Winter
1 January 2019	DF	(Ukraine) Ivan Semenykhyn	20	Unattached	Transfer	Free	
15 January 2019	DF	(Ukraine) Maksym Bilyi	28	(Ukraine) Zorya Luhansk	Transfer	Free	
15 January 2019	DF	(Ukraine) Vladyslav Savin	21	(Ukraine) Avanhard Kramatorsk	Transfer / Loan ?	Undisclosed	
17 January 2019	MF	(Ukraine) Ihor Bykovskyi	22	Unattached	Transfer	Free	
January 2019	MF	(Ukraine) Ihor Bykovskyi	23	(Germany) NTSV Strand 08	Transfer	Free	

== Pre-season and friendlies ==
25 June 2018 Friendly	Zorya Luhansk (Ukraine)	1–1	(Ukraine) FC Mariupol	Zaporizhia
EEST (UTC+03:00)	Hromov 85'	Report	Chobotenko 30'	Stadium: Torpedo Stadium

29 June 2018 Friendly	FC Mariupol (Ukraine)	3–3	(Ukraine) Yarud Mariupol	Mariupol
10:30 EEST (UTC+03:00)	Avahimyan 59'; Buhay 88'; Vakula 90'	Report	Mochevynskyi 34'; Bykovskyi 42' (pen.), 45'	Stadium: Mariupol train base

5 July 2018 Friendly	FC Mariupol (Ukraine)	0–0	Oman U-23	Kartepe, Turkey
17:00 EEST (UTC+03:00)		Report		Stadium: Green Park

6 July 2018 Friendly	FC Mariupol (Ukraine)	9–0	(Ghana) Dreams F.C.	Kartepe, Turkey
EEST (UTC+03:00)	Myshnyov 9'; Ihnatenko 13'; Fomin 41', 43'; Churko 44', 45'; Horbunov 69'; Chobotenko 79', 89'	Report		Stadium: Green Park

10 July 2018 Friendly	İstanbulspor (Turkey)	0–2	(Ukraine) FC Mariupol	Istanbul, Turkey
17:00 EEST (UTC+03:00)		Report	Myshnyov 16'; Fomin 32'	Stadium: Necmi kadıoğlu

12 July 2018 Friendly	FC Mariupol (Ukraine)	1–0	(Iran) Esteghlal	Kartepe, Turkey
17:00 EEST (UTC+03:00)	Churko 78'	Report		Stadium: Green Park

14 July 2018 Friendly	FC Mariupol (Ukraine)	1–1	(Morocco) FUS Rabat	Kartepe, Turkey
16:00 EEST (UTC+03:00)	Vakula 78'	Report	Saâdane 39'	Stadium: Green Park

9 September 2018 Friendly	FC Mariupol (Ukraine)	0–0	(Ukraine) Yarud Mariupol	Mariupol
14:00 EEST (UTC+03:00)		Report		Stadium: Volodymyr Boiko Stadium

18 November 2018 Friendly	FC Mariupol (Ukraine)	6–1	(Ukraine) Yarud Mariupol	Mariupol
12:30 EET (UTC+02:00)	Zubkov 6', 30'; Vakula 11', 33'; Myshnyov 39' (pen.); Pikhalyonok 45'	Report	Kalinin 54' (pen.)	Stadium: Volodymyr Boiko Stadium

20 January 2019 Friendly	FC Mariupol (Ukraine)	2–1	(Romania) Sepsi Sfântu Gheorghe	Side, Turkey
15:00 EET (UTC+02:00)	Boryachuk 12'; Putrya 32'	Report	Hamed 83'	Stadium: Starlight

25 January 2019 Friendly	FC Mariupol (Ukraine)	1–1	(Romania) Gaz Metan Mediaș	Side, Turkey
10:00 EET (UTC+02:00)	Constantin 23'	Report	Boryachuk 82'	Stadium: Starlight

28 January 2019 Friendly	FC Mariupol (Ukraine)	0–2	(Slovakia) Trenčín	Side, Turkey
16:00 EET (UTC+02:00)		Report	Umeh 67', 90'	Stadium: Starlight

5 February 2019 Friendly	FC Mariupol (Ukraine)	3–0	(Bulgaria) Arda Kardzhali	Belek, Turkey
10:00 EET (UTC+02:00)	Churko 13'; Dawa 28'; Vakula 85'	Report		Stadium: IC Santai

5 February 2019 Friendly	FC Mariupol (Ukraine)	0–2	(Armenia) Alashkert	Belek, Turkey
16:30 EET (UTC+02:00)		Report	Mauricio 19'; Stojković 39'	Stadium: IC Santai

9 February 2019 Friendly	FC Mariupol (Ukraine)	2–3	(South Korea) Pohang Steelers	Belek, Turkey
10:00 EET (UTC+02:00)	Dawa 63'; Ihnatenko 66' (pen.)	Report	Lee Do-Hyun 20' (pen.); Jeon Min-Gwang 40'; Kim Chan 78' (pen.)	Stadium: IC Santai

9 February 2019 Friendly	FC Mariupol (Ukraine)	3–1	(Kazakhstan) Aktobe	Belek, Turkey
16:30 EET (UTC+02:00)	Boryachuk 8' (pen.), 86'; Fedorchuk 55'	Report	Radin 68'	Stadium: IC Santai

13 February 2019 Friendly	FC Mariupol (Ukraine)	0–3	(Ukraine) Obolon-Brovar Kyiv	Side, Turkey
11:20 EET (UTC+02:00)		Report	Huskov 55'; Shevchenko 78'; Ostrovskyi 84'

27 March 2019 Friendly	FC Mariupol (Ukraine)	2–2	(Ukraine) Zorya Luhansk	Zaporizhia
15:00 EET (UTC+02:00)	Budkivskyi 52'; Lytvyn 62'	Report	Myshnyov 30'; Fedorchuk 74' (pen.)	Stadium: Torpedo Stadium

== Competitions ==
=== Overall ===
Competition	First match	Last match	Starting round	Final position	Record							
Competition	First match	Last match	Starting round	Final position	Pld	W	D	L	GF	GA	GD	Win %
Premier League	22 July 2018	30 May 2019	Matchday 1	4th	32	12	7	13	36	47	−11	37.50
Cup	31 October 2018	31 October 2018	Round of 16 (1/8)	Round of 16 (1/8)	1	0	0	1	1	3	−2	0.00
Europa League	26 July 2018	16 August 2018	2Q	3Q	4	1	1	2	5	7	−2	25.00
Total					37	13	8	16	42	57	−15	35.14

Last updated: 31 May 2019
Source: Competitions

=== Premier League ===
==== League table ====
Pos	Team	Pld	W	D	L	GF	GA	GD	Pts	Qualification or relegation
2	Dynamo Kyiv	32	22	6	4	54	18	+36	72	Qualification for the Champions League third qualifying round
3	FC Oleksandriya	32	14	7	11	39	34	+5	49	Qualification for the Europa League group stage (Note: Since the winners of the 2018–19 Ukrainian Cup, Shakhtar Donetsk, qualified for European competition based on league position, the spot awarded to the cup winners (Europa League group stage) was passed to the third-placed team, the spot awarded to the third-placed team (Europa League third qualifying round) was passed to the fourth-placed team, and the spot awarded to the fourth-placed team (Europa League second qualifying round) was passed to the fifth-placed team.)
4	FC Mariupol	32	12	7	13	36	47	−11	43 (Note: Head to Head: Mariupol – Zorya +3=0-1, advantage Mariupol.)	Qualification for the Europa League third qualifying round
5	Zorya Luhansk	32	11	10	11	39	34	+5	43	Qualification for the Europa League second qualifying round
6	FC Lviv	32	8	10	14	25	40	−15	34	

Source: Ukrainian Premier League (in Ukrainian), UEFA, Soccerway
Rules for classification: 1) Points; 2) Head-to-head points; 3) Head-to-head goal difference; 4) Head-to-head higher number of goals scored; 5) Goal difference; 6) Higher number of goals scored; 7) Draw or "golden match" if tied for title (Article 22, paragraph 3).
Notes:

Teams that placed 10th and 11th in the 2018–19 Ukrainian Premier League play two-leg play-off with the second and third teams of the 2018–19 Ukrainian First League. The draw for play-offs took place on 24 May 2019 and the games will be played on 4 and 8 June 2019.

Team 1	Agg.	Team 2	1st leg	2nd leg
Chornomorets Odesa	0 – 2	Kolos Kovalivka	0 – 0	0 – 2
Karpaty Lviv	3 – 1	Volyn Lutsk	0 – 0	3 – 1

=== First leg ===
4 June 2019
19:00 UTC+3

Chornomorets Odesa	0 – 0	Kolos Kovalivka
	Report

Chornomorets Stadium, Odesa
Attendance: 5,435
Referee: Anatoliy Abdula (Kharkiv)

4 June 2019
19:00 UTC+3

Karpaty Lviv	0 – 0	Volyn Lutsk
	Report

Ukraina Stadium, Lviv
Attendance: 10,104
Referee: Denys Shurman (Vyshneve)

=== Second leg ===
8 June 2019
17:00 UTC+3

Kolos Kovalivka	2 – 0	Chornomorets Odesa
Havrysh 57', 63' (pen.)	Report

Kolos Stadium, Kovalivka
Attendance: 2,500
Referee: Vitaliy Romanov

Kolos Kovalivka won 2–0 on aggregate and were promoted to the 2019–20 Ukrainian Premier League. Chornomorets Odesa were relegated to the 2019–20 Ukrainian First League

8 June 2019
19:00 UTC+3

Volyn Lutsk	0 – 3 ~~1 – 3~~	Karpaty Lviv
Kozhanov 42'	Report	Klyots 37'; Ponde 82' (pen.); Miroshnichenko 90+5'

Avanhard Stadium, Lutsk
Attendance: 5,200
Referee: Maksym Kozyryatskyi

Karpaty Lviv won 3–0 on aggregate and retained their spot in the 2019–20 Ukrainian Premier League. Volyn Lutsk remained in the 2019–20 Ukrainian First League

Due to fan violence at the game and attack on referee, the original score 1–3 was scratched and replaced with technical score 0–3 loss to Volyn and win for Karpaty. Additionally, the Lutsk department of police started criminal proceedings on the fact of intentional damage to property during the game by the Karpaty fans.

==== Results summary ====
Overall								Home						Away					
Pld	W	D	L	GF	GA	GD	Pts	W	D	L	GF	GA	GD	W	D	L	GF	GA	GD
32	12	7	13	36	47	−11	43	7	4	5	18	19	−1	5	3	8	18	28	−10

Last updated: 31 May 2019.
Source: Competitive matches

==== Results by round ====
Round	1	2	3	4	5	6	7	8	9	10	11	12	13	14	15	16	17	18	19	20	21	22	23	24	25	26	27	28	29	30	31	32
Ground	A	H	A	H	A	H	A	A	H	A	H	H	A	H	A	H	A	H	H	A	H	A	A	H	A	H	A	H	A	H	A	H
Result	L	L	W	L	L	D	L	W	W	W	D	W	L	W	L	W	D	L	W	D	D	D	W	L	L	L	W	W	L	D	L	W
Position	7	11	11	11	11	11	11	11	9	6	6	5	6	5	7	6	6	7	7	5	5	6	4	4	5	5	5	4	4	4	5	4

Updated to match(es) played on 31 May 2019. Source: Competitive matches
A = Away; H = Home; W = Win; D = Draw; L = Loss

==== Matches ====
22 July 2018 1	Zorya Luhansk	2–1	FC Mariupol	Zaporizhia
19:30 EEST (UTC+03:00)	Kamenyuka (yellow card) 8'; Kharatin (yellow card) 38'; Hordiyenko 50'; Karavayev 85'	Report	Churko 9' (pen.); Myshnyov (yellow card) 23'; Tyschenko (yellow card) 45'; Bykov (yellow card) 76'	Stadium: Slavutych-Arena; Attendance: 1,956; Referee: Mykola Balakin

29 July 2018 2	FC Mariupol	1–4	Desna Chernihiv	Mariupol
19:30 EEST (UTC+03:00)	Kyryukhantsev (yellow card) 28'; Vakula 68'	Report	Khlyobas 3', 22'; Filippov 59', 78'	Stadium: Volodymyr Boiko Stadium; Attendance: 1,516; Referee: Serhiy Boyko

5 August 2018 3	Arsenal Kyiv	1–2	FC Mariupol	Kyiv
19:30 EEST (UTC+03:00)	Ngeyitala 22'; Nikolić (yellow card) 35'	Report	Fomin 36' (pen.); Boryachuk 44'; Pikhalyonok (yellow card) 58'	Stadium: Dynamo Stadium; Attendance: 1,620; Referee: Dmytro Bondarenko

18 August 2018 5	Vorskla Poltava	2–1	FC Mariupol	Poltava
19:30 EEST (UTC+03:00)	Kulach 29'; Polehenko 88' (o.g.)	Report	Fomin 21'; Fedorchuk (yellow card) 32'; Churko (yellow card) 53'; Chobotenko (yellow card) 64'	Stadium: Vorskla Stadium; Attendance: 3,360; Referee: Yaroslav Kozyk

26 August 2018 6	FC Mariupol	2–2	FC Lviv	Mariupol
19:30 EEST (UTC+03:00)	Pikhalyonok 49'; Fedorchuk (yellow card) 54' (yellow-red card) 90+4'; Yavorskyi (yellow card) 56'; Churko 59'; Fomin (yellow card) 90+3'	Report	Paramonov 45+1'; Bruno Duarte 51'; Lucas Taylor (yellow card) 73'	Stadium: Volodymyr Boiko Stadium; Attendance: 2,400; Referee: Denys Shurman

1 September 2018 7	Shakhtar Donetsk	2–0	FC Mariupol	Kharkiv
19:30 EEST (UTC+03:00)	Rakitskiy (yellow card) 34'; Moraes 43'; Dawa 56' (o.g.)	Report	Tyschenko (yellow card) 40'	Stadium: OSC Metalist; Attendance: 8,014; Referee: Kateryna Monzul

16 September 2018 8	Olimpik Donetsk	1–3	FC Mariupol	Kyiv
14:00 EEST (UTC+03:00)	Vakulenko 26' (pen.), (yellow card) 86'	Report	Fedorchuk 9', 89', (yellow card) 64'; Zubkov (yellow card) 12'; Bykov (yellow card) 35'; Ihnatenko (yellow card) 59'; Polehenko (yellow card) 66'; Fomin 80'	Stadium: Dynamo Stadium; Attendance: 1,000; Referee: Yuriy Mozharovskyi

22 September 2018 9	FC Mariupol	1–0	FC Oleksandriya	Mariupol
14:00 EEST (UTC+03:00)	Fomin 8', (yellow card) 24'; Ihnatenko (yellow card) 21'; Bykov (yellow card) 90+3'	Report	Zaporozhan (yellow card) 84'	Stadium: Volodymyr Boiko Stadium; Attendance: 25; Referee: Mykola Kryvonosov

26 September 2018 4	FC Mariupol	0–2	Dynamo Kyiv	Mariupol
17:00 EEST (UTC+03:00)	Yavorskyi (yellow card) 24'; Bykov (yellow card) 65'	Report	Verbič 7'; Tsyhankov 25' (pen.); Kędziora (yellow card) 52'	Stadium: Volodymyr Boiko Stadium; Attendance: 5,106; Referee: Ihor Paskhal

30 September 2018 10	Chornomorets Odesa	0–1	FC Mariupol	Odesa
17:00 EEST (UTC+03:00)	Savchenko (yellow card) 49'; Musolitin (yellow card) 50'; Smirnov (yellow card) 74'	Report	Dawa (yellow card) 12'; Myshnyov (yellow card) 14'; Vakula 69'; Ihnatenko (yellow card) 85'	Stadium: Chornomorets Odesa; Attendance: 4,850; Referee: Vitaliy Romanov

6 October 2018 11	FC Mariupol	1–1	Karpaty Lviv	Mariupol
14:00 EEST (UTC+03:00)	Bykov (yellow card) 12'; Demiri (yellow card) 22'; Churko (yellow card) 42'; Boryachuk 52'; Myshnyov (yellow card) 88'; Tyschenko (yellow card) 90+6'	Report	Fedetskyi (yellow card) 9'; Hutsulyak 13'; Erbes (yellow card) 74'	Stadium: Volodymyr Boiko Stadium; Attendance: 2,120; Referee: Denys Shurman

20 October 2018 12	FC Mariupol	3–2	Zorya Luhansk	Mariupol
14:00 EEST (UTC+03:00)	Boryachuk 30', 36'; Fedorchuk (yellow card) 34' (yellow-red card) 65'; Vakula (yellow card) 50'; Bykov (yellow card) 60'; Zubkov 83'	Report	Silas (yellow card) 7'; Pryima (yellow card) 26'; Karavayev (red card) 75'; Hromov 90'; Kocherhin 90+2'	Stadium: Volodymyr Boiko Stadium; Attendance: 2,305; Referee: Ievgenii Aranovskyi

27 October 2018 13	Desna Chernihiv	2–0	FC Mariupol	Chernihiv
14:00 EEST (UTC+03:00)	Bezborodko 5', 47'	Report	Boryachuk (yellow card) 41'	Stadium: Chernihiv Stadium; Attendance: 2,873; Referee: Oleksandr Derdo

3 November 2018 14	FC Mariupol	1–0	Arsenal Kyiv	Mariupol
14:00 EET (UTC+02:00)	Fedorchuk (yellow card) 19'; Vakula 81'	Report	Dubinchak (yellow card) 25'; Ngeyitala (yellow card) 36'; Yermachenko (yellow card) 44'	Stadium: Volodymyr Boiko Stadium; Attendance: 2,200; Referee: Viktor Kopiyevskyi

11 November 2018 15	Dynamo Kyiv	4–0	FC Mariupol	Kyiv
17:00 EET (UTC+02:00)	Shaparenko 33'; Verbič 57'; Chobotenko 62' (o.g.); Morozyuk (yellow card) 67'; Tsyhankov 85' (pen.); Kádár (yellow card) 87'	Report	Tyschenko (yellow card) 21'; Fedorchuk (yellow card) 24'; Boryachuk (yellow card) 35'; Bykov (yellow card) 84'	Stadium: NSC Olimpiyskiy; Attendance: 7,162; Referee: Dmytro Kryvushkin

24 November 2018 16	FC Mariupol	1–0	Vorskla Poltava	Mariupol
14:00 EEST (UTC+03:00)	Vakula (yellow card) 29'; Ihnatenko (yellow card) 47'; Zubkov 57'; Demiri (yellow card) 59'; Yavorskyi (yellow card) 88'	Report	Sapay (yellow card) 51'; Sklyar (yellow card) 65'; Sharpar (yellow card) 68'	Stadium: Volodymyr Boiko Stadium; Attendance: 1,315; Referee: Dmytro Kutakov

2 December 2018 17	FC Lviv	2–2	FC Mariupol	Lviv
14:00 EET (UTC+02:00)	Bruno Duarte 6'; Voronin 24' (pen.); Pryimak (yellow card) 46'; Araujo (yellow card) 75'	Report	Pikhalyonok 22', (yellow card) 38'; Churko (yellow card) 51'; Boryachuk (yellow card) 71'; Vakula (yellow card) 74', (goal) 80'; Tyschenko (yellow card) 83'	Stadium: Arena Lviv; Attendance: 494; Referee: Yaroslav Kozyk

7 December 2018 18	FC Mariupol	0–3	Shakhtar Donetsk	Mariupol
17:00 EEST (UTC+03:00)	Yavorskyi (yellow card) 20'; Khudzhamov (yellow card) 62'; Dawa (yellow card) 64'; Bilyi (yellow card) 67'	Report	Kryvtsov (yellow card) 50'; Stepanenko 62'; Moraes 64'; Marlos 70'	Stadium: Volodymyr Boiko Stadium; Attendance: 5,983; Referee: Anatoliy Abdula

23 February 2019 19	FC Mariupol	2–1	Olimpik Donetsk	Mariupol
14:00 EEST (UTC+03:00)	Fedorchuk (yellow card) 19'; Pikhalyonok 45+1' (pen.); Boryachuk 48' (pen.)	Report	Hennadiy Pasich 25'; Makhnovskyi (yellow card) 45+1'	Stadium: Volodymyr Boiko Stadium; Attendance: 1,214; Referee: Denys Shurman

3 March 2019 20	FC Oleksandriya	1–1	FC Mariupol	Oleksandriya
17:00 EET (UTC+02:00)	Zaporozhan (yellow card) 25'; Banada 90'	Report	Zubkov 14', (yellow card) 19'; Demiri (yellow card) 40'; Ihnatenko (yellow card) 74'	Stadium: CSC Nika Stadium; Attendance: 1,405; Referee: Dmytro Kutakov

9 March 2018 21	FC Mariupol	0–0	Chornomorets Odesa	Mariupol
14:00 EET (UTC+02:00)	Ihnatenko (yellow card) 90+4'	Report	Mischenko (yellow card) 50'; Holikov (yellow card) 90'	Stadium: Volodymyr Boiko Stadium; Attendance: 2,227; Referee: Yuriy Mozharovskyi

17 March 2019 22	Karpaty Lviv	1–1	FC Mariupol	Lviv
17:00 EEST (UTC+03:00)	Ponde 33'; Hutsulyak (yellow card) 44'; Tolochko (yellow card) 51'; Debelko (yellow card) 73'; Di Franco (yellow card) 87'	Report	Zubkov 8', (yellow card) 90+2'; Demiri (yellow card) 14'; Myshnyov (yellow card) 21'; Yavorskyi (yellow card) 41'	Stadium: Ukraina Stadium; Attendance: 3,623; Referee: Viktor Kopiyevskyi

3 April 2019 23	FC Lviv	2–3	FC Mariupol	Lviv
19:30 EEST (UTC+03:00)	Alvaro (yellow card) 19'; Lipe Veloso 22'; Marthã (yellow card) 36' (yellow-red card) 53'; Pryimak 80'	Report	Ihnatenko (yellow card) 21'; Zubkov 55' (pen.), 77'; Boryachuk 70'; Halchuk (yellow card) 90'	Stadium: Ukraina Stadium; Attendance: 1,200; Referee: Mykola Balakin

13 April 2019 24	FC Mariupol	0–1	Dynamo Kyiv	Mariupol
14:00 EEST (UTC+03:00)	Ihnatenko (yellow card) 16'; Demiri (yellow card) 25'	Report	Andriyevskyi (yellow card) 45+1'; Shepelyev (yellow card) 72'; Tsyhankov 73'; Burda (yellow card) 87'; Popov (yellow card) 87'	Stadium: Volodymyr Boiko Stadium; Attendance: 8,069; Referee: Yuriy Mozharovskyi

24 April 2019 25	FC Oleksandriya	2–1	FC Mariupol	Oleksandriya
17:00 EEST (UTC+03:00)	Banada 20'; Hrechyshkin 32' (pen.); Zaporozhan (yellow card) 65'	Report	Yavorskyi (yellow card) 19'; Vakula 23'; Zubkov (yellow card) 62'; Bykov (yellow card) 65'; Pikhalyonok (yellow card) 82'; Boryachuk (yellow card) 84'; Fomin (yellow card) 86'	Stadium: CSC Nika Stadium; Attendance: 1,402; Referee: Anatoliy Abdula

28 April 2019 26	FC Mariupol	0–1	Shakhtar Donetsk	Mariupol
14:00 EEST (UTC+03:00)	Tyschenko (yellow card) 32'; Demiri (yellow card) 40'; Polehenko (red card) 49'; Yavorskyi (yellow card) 55'; Myshnyov (yellow card) 66'; Vakula (yellow card) 80'	Report	Nem 12'; Khocholava (yellow card) 58'	Stadium: Volodymyr Boiko Stadium; Attendance: 8,121; Referee: Yevhen Aranovskyi

4 May 2019 27	Zorya Luhansk	0–1	FC Mariupol	Zaporizhia
14:00 EEST (UTC+03:00)	Vernydub (yellow card) 64'	Report	Zubkov (yellow card) 32'; Fomin 34'; Churko (yellow card) 45+1'	Stadium: Slavutych-Arena; Attendance: 1,728; Referee: Oleksandr Derdo

11 May 2019 28	FC Mariupol	2–0	FC Lviv	Mariupol
14:00 EEST (UTC+03:00)	Ihnatenko (yellow card) 4'; Zubkov (yellow card) 50', (goal) 90+2'; Myshnyov (yellow card) 55'; Chobotenko (yellow card) 67'; Pikhalyonok 74'; Bykov (yellow card) 85'	Report	Vicente (yellow card) 39'; Marthã (yellow card) 51'; Bruno Duarte (yellow card) 85'	Stadium: Volodymyr Boiko Stadium; Attendance: 2,389; Referee: Vitaliy Romanov

18 May 2019 29	Dynamo Kyiv	2–1	FC Mariupol	Kyiv
17:00 EEST (UTC+03:00)	de Pena 32'; Rusyn (yellow card) 73'; Tsyhankov 87'	Report	Ihnatenko (yellow card) 28'; Bykov (yellow card) 37'; Fedorchuk 90+2'	Stadium: NSC Olimpiyskiy; Attendance: 12,142; Referee: Dmytro Kryvushkin

22 May 2019 30	FC Mariupol	1–1	FC Oleksandriya	Mariupol
17:00 EEST (UTC+03:00)	Polehenko (yellow card) 10'; Pikhalyonok 28'; Yavorskyi (red card) 44'	Report	Zaporozhan 45' (pen.); Zaderaka (yellow card) 54'	Stadium: Volodymyr Boiko Stadium; Attendance: 1,987; Referee: Yevhen Aranovskyi

26 May 2019 31	Shakhtar Donetsk	4–0	FC Mariupol	Kharkiv
19:30 EEST (UTC+03:00)	Dentinho 52', 56', 80'; Tetê 78'	Report		Stadium: OSC Metalist; Attendance: 5,297; Referee: Andriy Kovalenko

30 May 2019 32	FC Mariupol	3–1	Zorya Luhansk	Mariupol
17:00 EEST (UTC+03:00)	Zubkov 66'; Vakula 67'; Ihnatenko (yellow card) 90+3'; Boryachuk 90+4'	Report	Pikhalyonok 12' (o.g.); Silas (yellow card) 69'	Stadium: Volodymyr Boiko Stadium; Attendance: 1,712; Referee: Viktor Kopiyevskyi

=== Ukrainian Cup ===
31 October 2018 Round of 16 (1/8)	Inhulets Petrove	3–1	FC Mariupol	Petrove
15:00 EET (UTC+02:00)	Kozak 25' (pen.); Khuchbarov 45'; Kobuladze 61', (red card) 82'	Report	Pospelov (red card) 20'; Bykov (yellow card) 60'; Buhay (yellow card) 64'; Polehenko 83' (pen.)	Stadium: Inhulets Stadium; Attendance: 600; Referee: Volodymyr Novokhatniy

=== UEFA Europa League ===
26 July 2018 2Q	Djurgårdens IF (Sweden)	1–1	(Ukraine) FC Mariupol	Stockholm, Sweden
20:00 EEST (UTC+03:00)	Ring (yellow card) 71'; Walker (yellow card) 75'; Olsson (yellow card) 90'; Badji 90+4'	Report	Yavorskyi 37'; Horbunov (yellow card) 76'; Khudzhamov (yellow card) 90+2'; Pikhalyonok (yellow card) 90+6'	Stadium: Tele2 Arena; Attendance: 11,200; Referee: Miroslav Zelinka

2 August 2018 2Q	FC Mariupol (Ukraine)	2–1	(Sweden) Djurgårdens IF	Odesa
20:00 EEST (UTC+03:00)	Fomin (yellow card) 56', (goal) 97' (pen.); Pikhalyonok (yellow card) 61', (goal) 63'	Report	Badji (yellow card) 56', (goal) 77'; Augustinsson (yellow card) 65'; Karlström (yellow card) 83'; Olsson (yellow card) 96'; Ulvestad (yellow card) 114'; Mrabti (yellow card) 120+2'	Stadium: Chornomorets Stadium; Attendance: 5,077; Referee: Rob Harvey

9 August 2018 3Q	FC Mariupol (Ukraine)	1–3	(France) Bordeaux	Odesa
20:00 EEST (UTC+03:00)	Myshnyov 7'; Churko (yellow card) 41'; Demiri (yellow card) 81'	Report	Laborde 33', 37'; Tchouaméni 49'	Stadium: Chornomorets Stadium; Attendance: 6,587; Referee: Ivan Bebek

16 August 2018 3Q	Bordeaux (France)	2–1	(Ukraine) FC Mariupol	Bordeaux, France
21:45 EEST (UTC+03:00)	Poundjé 54'; Sankharé 56'; Lewczuk (yellow card) 90'	Report	Boryachuk (yellow card) 22'; Fomin 66'; Pikhalyonok (yellow card) 88'	Stadium: Nouveau Stade de Bordeaux; Attendance: 11,375; Referee: Andrew Dallas

== Statistics ==
=== Appearances and goals ===
No.	Pos	Nat	Player	Total		Premier League		Cup		EL	
No.	Pos	Nat	Player	Apps	Goals	Apps	Goals	Apps	Goals	Apps	Goals
Goalkeepers
1	GK	(Ukraine) UKR	Yevhen Halchuk	20	0	18	0	0+1	0	1	0
12	GK	(Ukraine) UKR	Rustam Khudzhamov	17	0	14	0	0	0	3	0
33	GK	(Ukraine) UKR	Artem Pospelov	1	0	0	0	1	0	0	0
Defenders
2	DF	(Ukraine) UKR	Oleksiy Bykov	24	0	20	0	1	0	3	0
4	DF	(Ukraine) UKR	Serhiy Chobotenko	24	0	18+4	0	0	0	0+2	0
5	DF	(Cameroon) CMR	Joyskim Dawa	11	0	7	0	1	0	2+1	0
13	DF	(Ukraine) UKR	Serhiy Yavorskyi	32	1	28	0	0	0	3+1	1
23	DF	(Albania) ALB	Besir Demiri	25	0	19+2	0	0	0	4	0
29	DF	(Ukraine) UKR	Ihor Kyryukhantsev	17	0	11+2	0	1	0	2+1	0
Midfielders
6	MF	(Ukraine) UKR	Yevheniy Bilokin	5	0	1+3	0	1	0	0	0
8	MF	(Ukraine) UKR	Pavlo Polehenko	26	1	17+4	0	1	1	2+2	0
9	MF	(Ukraine) UKR	Dmytro Myshnyov	35	1	29+2	0	0	0	4	1
11	MF	(Ukraine) UKR	Vyacheslav Churko	27	2	17+6	2	0	0	4	0
17	MF	(Ukraine) UKR	Serhiy Horbunov	12	0	5+5	0	0	0	0+2	0
19	MF	(Ukraine) UKR	Ihor Tyschenko	29	0	16+9	0	0	0	4	0
21	MF	(Ukraine) UKR	Danylo Lytovchenko	1	0	0+1	0	0	0	0	0
22	MF	(Ukraine) UKR	Oleksandr Zubkov	22	8	19+3	8	0	0	0	0
25	MF	(Ukraine) UKR	Valeriy Fedorchuk	22	3	20+2	3	0	0	0	0
27	MF	(Ukraine) UKR	Ivan Mochevinskyi	1	0	0	0	0+1	0	0	0
28	MF	(Ukraine) UKR	Andriy Korobenko	2	0	1	0	1	0	0	0
34	MF	(Ukraine) UKR	Mykyta Peterman	1	0	0+1	0	0	0	0	0
70	MF	(Ukraine) UKR	Yevhen Prodanov	2	0	0+1	0	1	0	0	0
76	MF	(Ukraine) UKR	Oleksandr Pikhalyonok	30	6	21+5	5	0	0	4	1
97	MF	(Ukraine) UKR	Danylo Ihnatenko	20	0	15+5	0	0	0	0	0
98	MF	(Ukraine) UKR	Illya Putrya	5	0	2+2	0	1	0	0	0
Forwards
7	FW	(Ukraine) UKR	Andriy Boryachuk	28	7	15+11	7	0	0	1+1	0
14	FW	(Ukraine) UKR	Danylo Sikan	6	0	2+4	0	0	0	0	0
77	FW	(Ukraine) UKR	Vladyslav Buhay	5	0	0+4	0	1	0	0	0
86	FW	(Ukraine) UKR	Ruslan Fomin	22	7	15+3	5	0	0	4	2
99	FW	(Ukraine) UKR	Vladyslav Vakula	33	6	18+12	6	0	0	0+3	0
Players transferred out during the season
30	DF	(Ukraine) UKR	Maksym Bilyi	10	0	4+2	0	1	0	3	0
44	DF	(Ukraine) UKR	Ivan Semenykhyn	1	0	0	0	0+1	0	0	0
96	MF	(Ukraine) UKR	Ihor Bykovskyi	1	0	0+1	0	0	0	0	0

Source: Competitions

Last updated: 31 May 2019

=== Goalscorers ===
Rank	No.	Pos	Nat	Name	Premier League	Cup	EL	Total
1	22	MF	(Ukraine)	Oleksandr Zubkov	8	0	0	8
2	7	FW	(Ukraine)	Andriy Boryachuk	7	0	0	7
2	86	FW	(Ukraine)	Ruslan Fomin	5	0	2	7
4	76	MF	(Ukraine)	Oleksandr Pikhalyonok	5	0	1	6
4	99	FW	(Ukraine)	Vladyslav Vakula	6	0	0	6
6	25	MF	(Ukraine)	Valeriy Fedorchuk	3	0	0	3
7	11	MF	(Ukraine)	Vyacheslav Churko	2	0	0	2
8	8	MF	(Ukraine)	Pavlo Polehenko	0	1	0	1
8	9	MF	(Ukraine)	Dmytro Myshnyov	0	0	1	1
8	13	DF	(Ukraine)	Serhiy Yavorskyi	0	0	1	1
				Own goal	0	0	0	0
				Total	36	1	5	42

Last updated: 31 May 2019

=== Clean sheets ===
Rank	No.	Pos	Nat	Name	Premier League	Cup	EL	Total
1	1	GK	(Ukraine)	Yevhen Halchuk	6	0	0	6
2	12	GK	(Ukraine)	Rustam Khudzhamov	1	0	0	1
				Total	7	0	0	7

Last updated: 31 May 2019

=== Disciplinary record ===
No.	Pos	Nat	Player	Premier League			Cup			EL			Total		
No.	Pos	Nat	Player	Booked	(yellow card) (yellow-red card)	Sent off (straight red)	Booked	(yellow card) (yellow-red card)	Sent off (straight red)	Booked	(yellow card) (yellow-red card)	Sent off (straight red)	Booked	(yellow card) (yellow-red card)	Sent off (straight red)
1	GK	(Ukraine)	Yevhen Halchuk	1	0	0	0	0	0	0	0	0	1	0	0
2	DF	(Ukraine)	Oleksiy Bykov	10	0	0	1	0	0	0	0	0	11	1	0
4	DF	(Ukraine)	Serhiy Chobotenko	2	0	0	0	0	0	0	0	0	2	0	0
5	DF	(Cameroon)	Joyskim Dawa	2	0	0	0	0	0	0	0	0	2	0	0
7	FW	(Ukraine)	Andriy Boryachuk	4	0	0	0	0	0	1	0	0	5	0	0
8	MF	(Ukraine)	Pavlo Polehenko	2	0	1	0	0	0	0	0	0	2	0	1
9	MF	(Ukraine)	Dmytro Myshnyov	6	0	0	0	0	0	0	0	0	6	0	0
11	MF	(Ukraine)	Vyacheslav Churko	4	0	0	0	0	0	1	0	0	5	0	0
12	GK	(Ukraine)	Rustam Khudzhamov	1	0	0	0	0	0	1	0	0	2	0	0
13	DF	(Ukraine)	Serhiy Yavorskyi	7	0	1	0	0	0	0	0	0	7	0	1
17	MF	(Ukraine)	Serhiy Horbunov	0	0	0	0	0	0	1	0	0	1	0	0
19	MF	(Ukraine)	Ihor Tyschenko	6	0	0	0	0	0	0	0	0	6	0	0
22	MF	(Ukraine)	Oleksandr Zubkov	6	0	0	0	0	0	0	0	0	6	0	0
23	DF	(Albania)	Besir Demiri	6	0	0	0	0	0	1	0	0	7	0	0
25	MF	(Ukraine)	Valeriy Fedorchuk	5	2	0	0	0	0	0	0	0	5	2	0
30	DF	(Ukraine)	Maksym Bilyi	1	0	0	0	0	0	0	0	0	1	0	0
29	DF	(Ukraine)	Ihor Kyryukhantsev	1	0	0	0	0	0	0	0	0	1	0	0
33	GK	(Ukraine)	Artem Pospelov	0	0	0	0	0	1	0	0	0	0	0	1
76	MF	(Ukraine)	Oleksandr Pikhalyonok	3	0	0	0	0	0	3	0	0	6	0	0
77	FW	(Ukraine)	Vladyslav Buhay	0	0	0	1	0	0	0	0	0	1	0	0
86	FW	(Ukraine)	Ruslan Fomin	3	0	0	0	0	0	1	0	0	4	0	0
97	MF	(Ukraine)	Danylo Ihnatenko	11	0	0	0	0	0	0	0	0	11	0	0
99	FW	(Ukraine)	Vladyslav Vakula	4	0	0	0	0	0	0	0	0	4	0	0
			Total	85	2	2	2	0	1	9	0	0	96	2	3

Last updated: 31 May 2019
