= 2026–27 Macedonian Football Cup =

Tournament details
- Country: North Macedonia
- Dates: 2 September 2026 – TBD
- Teams: 31

Tournament statistics
- Matches played: 22
- Goals scored: 120 (5.45 per match)

The 2026–27 Macedonian Football Cup is the 34th season of North Macedonia's football knockout competition. Sileks are the defending champions, having won their fourth title in the previous year.

Shkëndija is suspended from this edition of the cup for not showing up for the medal ceremony at last season’s final.

== Competition calendar ==
Round	Date(s)	Fixtures	Clubs	New entries
First Round	2–24 September, 6 and 14 October 2026	15	31 → 16	none
Second Round	28 October and 25 November 2026	8	16 → 8	4
Quarter-finals	TBD	4	8 → 4	none
Semi-finals	TBD	2	4 → 2	none
Final	TBD	1	2 → 1	none

== First round ==
The draw was held on 20 August 2026. The winners from the previous season (Sileks) received bye.

=== Summary ===
Team 1	Score	Team 2
2 September 2026
Pobeda Valandovo (3)	1–10	Struga (1)
Studeniçan (3)	1–6	Pelister (2)
Venec (3)	0–8	AP Brera (2)
Vëllazërimi J 1977 (3)	0–14	Makedonija G.P. (2)
3 September 2026
Ovche Pole (3)	0–5	Vardar (1)
9 September 2026
BVK Konjare (3)	0–5	Bashkimi (1)
Sasa (3)	1–0	Shkupi (2)
Teteks (2)	1–4	Bregalnica (1)
Kozhuf (2)	0–1	Skopje (1)
Detonit Plachkovica (2)	1–3	Shkëndija 77 (1)
Novaci (2)	1–0	Ohrid (2)
Osogovo (2)	1–3	Belasica (2)
24 September 2026
Mogila (3)	0–12	Arsimi (1)
6 October 2026
Kroschu (3)	0–13	Tikvesh (1)
14 October 2026
Vardar Negotino (3)	0–8	Rabotnichki (2)

=== Matches ===
2 September 2026
16:30 CEST

Pobeda Valandovo (3)	1–10	Struga (1)
Shata 59'	Report	Rochi 2', 12', 25', 45'; Aliji 3', 41'; Akinlosotu 32', 79'; Vosha 57'; Demiri 65'

Gradska Plazha, Struga
Referee: Dimitar Leveski (Ohrid)

2 September 2026
16:30 CEST

Studeniçan (3)	1–6	Pelister (1)
Kjani 30'	Report	Stojilevski 11'; Ljamchevski 14'; Sivakov 18'; K. Stojanov 34' (pen.); Talevski 84'; Presilski 86'

Stadion Gorno Lisiche, Skopje
Referee: Bardhilj Ibraimi (Tetovo)

2 September 2026
16:30 CEST

Venec (3)	0–8	AP Brera (1)
	Report	Sejmenov 13', 22', 47', 63'; Ristov 20'; Mitrev 32'; Buchkov 86', 87'

Gradski stadion, Negotino
Referee: Blazhe Petkovski (Miravci)

2 September 2026
16:30 CEST

Vëllazërimi J 1977 (3)	0–14	Makedonija G.P. (1)
	Report	Sulejmani 22'; Gorgiovski 32'; Mitreski 34', 60'; Tanevski 38'; Ismani 44'; Talevski 51', 55', 89'; Mladenovikj 70', 84'; Gjorgjievski 78'; Blazheski 79'

Stadion Golemo Konjari, Golemo Konjari
Referee: Darko Stojanov (Shtip)

3 September 2026
16:30 CEST

Ovche Pole (3)	0–5	Vardar (1)
	Report	Diabate 38'; Omeragikj 55', 67'; Spahiu 58'; B. Nikolov 86'

Gradski stadion, Sveti Nikole
Referee: Krumislav Gjorgiev (Shtip)

9 September 2026
16:00 CEST

BVK Konjare (3)	0–5	Bashkimi (1)
	Report	Aliev 25' (o.g.); Mirchevski 62'; Kapllanaj 69'; Stafa 78'; Ristovski 81'

Stadion Petrovec, Petrovec
Referee: Bobi Velichkov (Veles)

9 September 2026
16:00 CEST

Sasa (2)	1–0	Shkupi (2)
Paunov 36'	Report

Gradski stadion, Makedonska Kamenica
Referee: Ivica Perovski (Brvenica)

9 September 2026
16:00 CEST

Teteks (2)	1–4	Bregalnica (1)
Ristevski 28'	Report	Aleksovski 36'; Lawrenzo 49'; Jovanoski 73' (o.g.); Tasev 77'

Gradski stadion, Shtip
Referee: Aleksandar Vasilevski (Skopje)

9 September 2026
16:00 CEST

Kozhuf (2)	0–1	Skopje (1)
	Report	Angelov 45+1'

Gradski stadion, Gevgelija
Referee: Angelcho Ristov (Negotino)

9 September 2026
16:00 CEST

Detonit Plachkovica (2)	1–3	Shkëndija 77 (1)
Ivanov 54'	Report	Elezi 33'; Simonovski 42'; Demiri 68' (pen.)

Gradski stadion, Radovish
Referee: Blagojche Ralevski (Bitola)

9 September 2026
16:00 CEST

Novaci (2)	1–0	Ohrid (2)
Trajkoski 88'	Report

Stadion Novaci, Novaci
Referee: Nderim Tefiku (Kumanovo)

9 September 2026
16:00 CEST

Osogovo (2)	1–3	Belasica (2)
Trajchov 40'	Report	Emush 47'; B. Stojanov 61'; Memedi 88'

Stadion Nikola Mantov, Kochani
Attendance: 92
Referee: Jordan Jovanovski (Gevgelija)

24 September 2026
16:00 CEST

Mogila (3)	0–12	Arsimi (1)
	Report	Kaba 19', 45+1', 54'; Gaye 27', 60'; Jusufi 44'; Gafuri 58'; Ribaudo 67'; Velija 75'; Selmani 78'; Mustafa 83'; Memeti 88'

Stadion Dimche Sarvanov "Mogilcheto", Mogila
Referee: Nenad Todorovski (Skopje)

6 October 2026
14:00 CEST

Kroschu (3)	0–13	Tikvesh (1)
	Report	Elmas 5'; Lawal 11', 35', 54'; Ackovski 22', 58'; Sylla 37'; Okere 48', 84'; Adeshina 66' (pen.), 75', 77'; Spasov 81'

Gradski stadion, Negotino
Referee: Plarent Salihi (Tetovo)

14 October 2026
15:00 CEST

Vardar Negotino (3)	0–8	Rabotnichki (2)
	Report	Bogdanoski 12', 29'; Zaturoski 14'; Alili 31'; Hasikj 53'; Ganiu 61', 73'; Podgragja 64'

Gradski stadion, Negotino
Referee: Done Ristovski (Gevgelija)

== Second round ==
The draw was held on 15 October 2026.

=== Summary ===
Team 1	Score	Team 2
28 October 2026
Skopje (1)	1–0	Novaci (2)
Struga (1)	2–0	Belasica (2)
Vardar (1)	3–0 (w/o)^{1}	Tikvesh (1)
Rabotnichki (2)	3–2	Sasa (3)
Makedonija G.P. (2)	2–2 (5–4 p)	Bregalnica (1)
Bashkimi (1)	0–2	Shkëndija 77 (1)
Pelister (2)	0–3	Sileks (1)
25 November 2026
AP Brera (2)	–	Arsimi (1)

^{1}The match was originally finished with a score of 1–3 for Tikvesh, but the match was awarded to Vardar because the away team made an administrative error by attaching other player’s medical document on Okere’s profile.

=== Matches ===
28 October 2026
13:30 CET

Skopje (1)	1–0	Novaci (2)
Gordić 67'	Report

Stadion Zhelezarnica, Skopje
Referee: Aleksandar Vasilevski (Skopje)

28 October 2026
13:30 CET

Struga (1)	2–0	Belasica (2)
Radeski 35', 38'	Report

Gradska Plazha, Struga
Referee: Plarent Salihi (Tetovo)

28 October 2026
13:30 CET

Vardar (1)	3–0 (Awarded)	Tikvesh (1)
B. Nikolov 58'	Report	Okere 49'; Sylla 62'; Lawal 75'

Petar Miloshevski Training Centre, Skopje
Referee: Aleksandar Grujoski (Kichevo)

Tikvesh won the match by 1–3, but eventually forfeited due to the away team made an administrative error by attaching other player’s medical document on Okere’s profile.

28 October 2026
13:30 CET

Rabotnichki (2)	3–2	Sasa (3)
Bogdanoski 26', 31', 80'	Report	Nikolovski 15', 55'

Stadion Boris Trajkovski, Skopje
Referee: Marjan Dejanoski (Kichevo)

28 October 2026
13:30 CET

Makedonija G.P. (2)	2–2	Bregalnica (1)
Tomovski 58'; Ismani 89' (pen.)	Report; Penalties	I. Nikolov 26'; Gligorov 36'
Penalties
Tomovski (penalty scored); Ismani (penalty scored); Markovski (penalty scored); Talevski (penalty scored); Blazheski (penalty scored)	5–4	(penalty scored) Stojkoski; (penalty scored) I. Nikolov; (penalty scored) Stojanov; (penalty scored) Rajkov; (penalty missed) Angelov

Stadion Gjorche Petrov, Skopje
Referee: Dimitar Leveski (Ohrid)

28 October 2026
13:30 CET

Bashkimi (1)	0–2	Shkëndija 77 (1)
	Report	Simonovski 11'; Demiri 77' (pen.)

KF Bashkimi Stadium, Kumanovo
Referee: Stojanche Stojanov (Shtip)

28 October 2026
16:30 CET

Pelister (2)	0–3	Sileks (1)
	Report	Hasukić 11', 33'; Manojlov 35'

Stadion Petar Miloshevski, Bitola
Referee: Done Ristovski (Gevgelija)

25 November 2026
13:00 CET

AP Brera (2)	–	Arsimi (1)

Stadion Blagoj Istatov, Strumica

== See also ==
- 2026–27 Macedonian First Football League
- 2026–27 Macedonian Second Football League
