= 2026–27 Macedonian First Football League =

Macedonian First League
- Season: 2026–27
- Dates: 24 July 2026 – 23 May 2027
- Matches: 65
- Goals: 174 (2.68 per match)
- Top goalscorer: N'fanly Sylla (10 goals)
- All statistics correct as of 8 November 2026.

The 2026–27 Macedonian First League is the 35th season of the Macedonian First Football League, the highest football league of North Macedonia. This is the first season with the 10 teams since the 2019–20 season. It began on 24 July 2026 and is scheduled to end on 23 May 2027. Vardar are the defending champions, having won their twelfth title in 2025–26.

== Promotion and relegation ==
At the end of the 2025–26 season

Promoted from 2025–26 Second League

- Bregalnica (winners, promoted after two season absence)
- Skopje (second place; won play-off, promoted after three seasons' absence)
- Shkëndija 77 (Third place; won play-off, promoted for the first time in their history)

Relegated to 2026–27 Second League

- Brera (8th; lost play-off, relegated after a nine seasons spell in the top flight)
- Pelister (9th; lost play-off, relegated after a two seasons spell in the top flight)
- Makedonija G.P. (10th, relegated after a single season spell in top flight)
- Rabotnički (11th, relegated after an 28 seasons spell in top flight)
- Shkupi (12th, relegated after an 11 seasons spell in top flight)

== Participating teams ==
| Arsimi | Bregalnica | Shkëndija | Shkëndija 77 |
|---|---|---|---|
| City Stadium Gostivar | City Stadium Štip | City Stadium Gostivar (temporarily) | Čair Stadium |
| Capacity: 4,000 | Capacity: 8,000 | Capacity: 4,000 | Capacity: 4,500 |
| Sileks | Location of teams in 2026–27 Macedonian First League | | Skopje |
| Sileks Stadium | Location of teams in 2026–27 Macedonian First League | | FFM Training Centre |
| Capacity: 1,800 | Location of teams in 2026–27 Macedonian First League | | Capacity: 2,500 |
| Bashkimi | Struga | Tikvesh | Vardar |
| KF Bashkimi Stadium | Gradska Plaža Stadium | Kavadarci City Stadium | National Arena Todor Proeski; UEFA |
| Capacity: 3,500 | Capacity: 2,000 | Capacity: 7,500 | Capacity: 33,011 |

=== Personnel and kits ===
Note: Flags indicate national team as has been defined under FIFA eligibility rules. Players may hold more than one non-FIFA nationality.

| Team | Manager | Captain | Kit manufacturer | Shirt sponsor |
|---|---|---|---|---|
| Arsimi | (North Macedonia) Vildan Saliu | (North Macedonia) Argjent Gafuri | Sporttex | Ardival AG |
| Bashkimi | (North Macedonia) Gajur Rexhepi | (North Macedonia) Adis Murati | Jako | Prime Group |
| Bregalnica | (North Macedonia) Nikola Kuzmanov | (North Macedonia) Stefan Kocev | Joma | |
| Shkëndija | (North Macedonia) Artim Pollozhani | (North Macedonia) Besart Ibraimi | Macron | Ecolog |
| Shkëndija 77 | (North Macedonia) Berat Imeri | (North Macedonia) Besir Demiri | Sporttex | Franck |
| Sileks | (North Macedonia) Aleksandar Vasoski | (North Macedonia) Darko Angjeleski | Macron | Sileks |
| Skopje | (North Macedonia) Muarem Muarem | (North Macedonia) Kristijan Naumovski | Adidas | Gazi Baba Municipality |
| Struga | (Albania) Bledi Shkëmbi | (North Macedonia) Bunjamin Shabani | Macron | Trim & Lum |
| Tikvesh | (Slovenia) Oliver Bogatinov | (North Macedonia) Aleksandar Varelovski | Hummel | |
| Vardar | (Montenegro) Miodrag Božović | (North Macedonia) Azer Omeragikj | Erima | Novomatic Macedonia |

== League table ==
| Pos | Team | Pld | W | D | L | GF | GA | GD | Pts | Qualification or relegation |
|---|---|---|---|---|---|---|---|---|---|---|
| 1 | Struga | 14 | 10 | 2 | 2 | 30 | 8 | +22 | 32 | Qualification for the Champions League first qualifying round |
| 2 | Tikvesh | 14 | 7 | 6 | 1 | 29 | 10 | +19 | 27 | Qualification for the Conference League first qualifying round |
| 3 | Shkëndija | 13 | 8 | 3 | 2 | 26 | 12 | +14 | 27 | Qualification for the Conference League first qualifying round |
| 4 | Vardar | 14 | 7 | 3 | 4 | 18 | 13 | +5 | 24 | |
| 5 | Shkëndija 77 | 14 | 5 | 3 | 6 | 10 | 16 | −6 | 18 | |
| 6 | Sileks | 13 | 4 | 5 | 4 | 19 | 12 | +7 | 17 | |
| 7 | Bregalnica | 14 | 4 | 2 | 8 | 18 | 25 | −7 | 14 | |
| 8 | Bashkimi | 14 | 4 | 2 | 8 | 14 | 34 | −20 | 14 | Qualification for the Macedonian First Football League play-off |
| 9 | Arsimi | 14 | 2 | 4 | 8 | 13 | 31 | −18 | 10 | Relegation to the Macedonian Second League |
| 10 | Skopje | 14 | 1 | 4 | 9 | 7 | 23 | −16 | 7 | Relegation to the Macedonian Second League |

Updated to match(es) played on 22 November 2026. Source: FFM.mk, MacedonianFootball.com
Rules for classification: 1) Points; 2) Goal difference; 3) Goals scored; 4) Head-to-head points; 5) Head-to-head goal difference; 6) Head-to-head away goals scored (only if two teams); 7) Head-to-head goals scored; 8) Draw; 9) Play-off. (Note: Criteria 2, 3 and 8 is only used if not deciding Champion, teams for UEFA competitions or relegation).

== Results ==
| Home \ Away | ARS | BAS | BRE | SKE | S77 | SIL | SKO | STR | TIK | VAR | ARS | BAS | BRE | SKE | S77 | SIL | SKO | STR | TIK | VAR |
|---|---|---|---|---|---|---|---|---|---|---|---|---|---|---|---|---|---|---|---|---|
| Arsimi | — | 1–0 | 3–4 | 2–2 | 0–2 | 1–1 | 0–0 | | 1–1 | | — | | | | | | | | | |
| Bashkimi | 2–1 | — | 1–1 | | 1–2 | 0–3 | | 2–1 | 0–5 | 3–3 | | — | | | | | | | | |
| Bregalnica | 4–0 | 3–0 | — | 1–2 | 0–1 | | 1–0 | 1–2 | | 0–1 | | | — | | | | | | | |
| Shkëndija | | 4–1 | 4–1 | — | | | 3–0 | 2–1 | 1–3 | 0–0 | | | | — | | | | | | |
| Shkëndija 77 | 0–2 | 0–1 | | 1–1 | — | 1–1 | 1–0 | 0–2 | 1–1 | | | | | | — | | | | | |
| Sileks | | 6–0 | 2–2 | 0–2 | 2–0 | — | 3–0 | | 0–0 | 0–1 | | | | | | — | | | | |
| Skopje | 2–1 | 1–2 | | 1–3 | | 0–0 | — | 1–1 | 1–1 | 1–2 | | | | | | | — | | | |
| Struga | 6–0 | | 4–0 | 1–0 | 3–0 | 1–0 | 4–0 | — | | 1–0 | | | | | | | | — | | |
| Tikvesh | 5–1 | 3–1 | 3–0 | | 0–1 | | 1–0 | 2–2 | — | 1–1 | | | | | | | | | — | |
| Vardar | 2–0 | | 2–0 | 0–2 | 2–0 | 4–1 | | 0–1 | 0–3 | — | | | | | | | | | | — |

Updated to match(es) played on 22 November 2026. Source: FFM.mk, MacedonianFootball.com
Legend: Blue = home team win; Yellow = draw; Red = away team win.
For upcoming matches, an "a" indicates there is an article about the rivalry between the two participants.

== See also ==
- 2026–27 Macedonian Football Cup
- 2026–27 Macedonian Second Football League
