= Oleksandr Pikhalyonok =

Ukrainian footballer

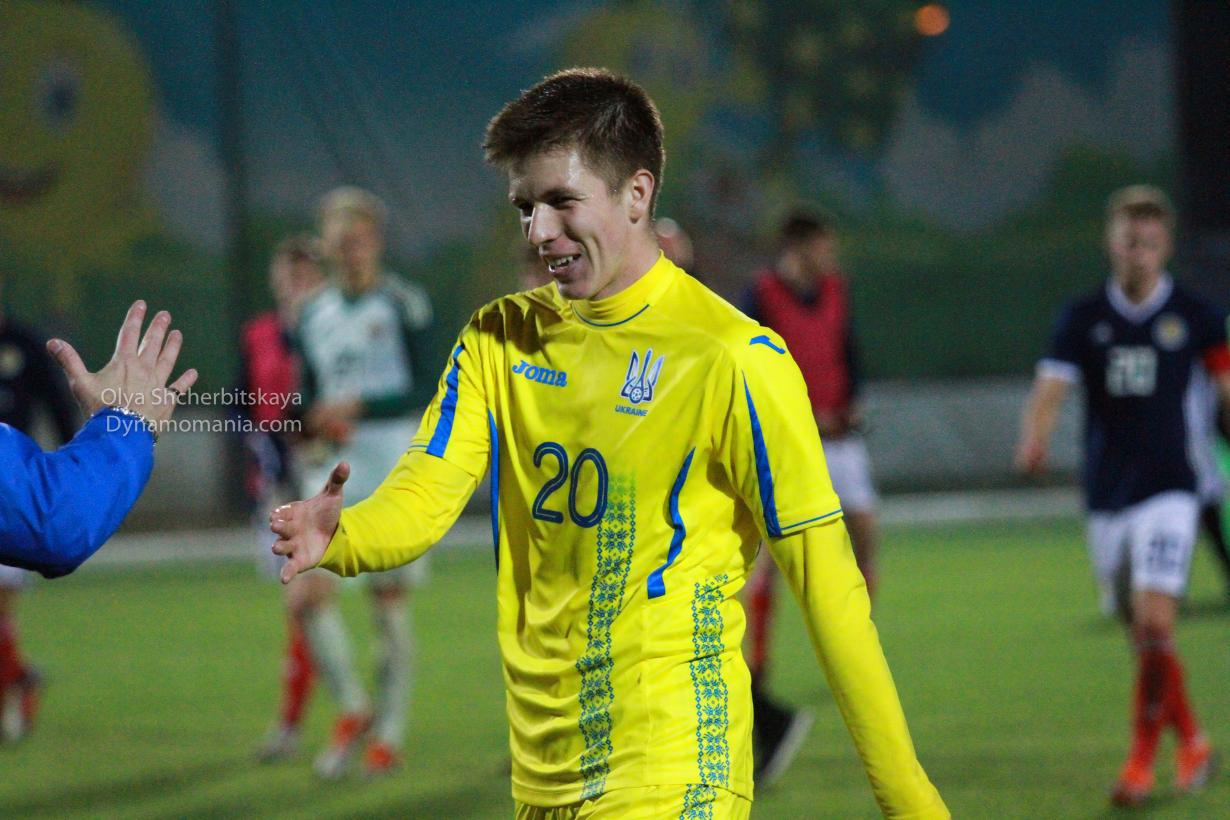

Personal information
- Full name: Oleksandr Oleksandrovych Pikhalyonok
- Date of birth: 7 May 1997 (age 29)
- Place of birth: Donetsk, Ukraine
- Height: 1.81 m (5 ft 11 in)
- Position: Central midfielder

Team information
- Current team: Dynamo Kyiv
- Number: 8

Youth career
- 2010–2014: Shakhtar Donetsk

Senior career*
Years	Team	Apps	(Gls)
2014–2021	Shakhtar Donetsk	7	(0)
2018–2019	→ Mariupol (loan)	36	(5)
2020–2021	→ Dnipro-1 (loan)	14	(0)
2021–2024	Dnipro-1	69	(16)
2024–	Dynamo Kyiv	54	(6)

International career^{‡}
2012–2013	Ukraine U16	16	(1)
2013–2014	Ukraine U17	15	(0)
2014–2015	Ukraine U18	11	(1)
2015–2016	Ukraine U19	11	(3)
2017–2018	Ukraine U21	6	(1)
2022–	Ukraine	15	(0)
- * Club domestic league appearances and goals as of 23 October 2026 ‡ National team caps and goals as of 6 October 2026

Oleksandr Oleksandrovych Pikhalyonok (Ukrainian: Олександр Олександрович Піхальонок; born 7 May 1997) is a Ukrainian professional footballer who plays as a central midfielder for Dynamo Kyiv in the Ukrainian Premier League and the Ukraine national team.

== Career ==
Pikhalyonok is a product of the Shakhtar youth sportive school and signed a contract with Shakhtar Donetsk in the Ukrainian Premier League in 2014.

He played in the Ukrainian Premier League Reserves and made his debut for Shakhtar Donetsk in the Ukrainian Premier League in a match against Oleksandriya on 31 May 2017.

== Career statistics ==
=== Club ===
As of 27 October 2026

Appearances and goals by club, season and competition
Club	Season	League			Cup		Continental		Other		Total	
Club	Season	Division	Apps	Goals	Apps	Goals	Apps	Goals	Apps	Goals	Apps	Goals
Shakhtar Donetsk	2016–17	Ukrainian Premier League	1	0	0	0	0	0	0	0	1	0
Shakhtar Donetsk	2017–18	Ukrainian Premier League	1	0	0	0	0	0	0	0	1	0
Shakhtar Donetsk	2019–20	Ukrainian Premier League	5	0	0	0	0	0	0	0	5	0
Shakhtar Donetsk	Total		7	0	0	0	0	0	0	0	7	0
Mariupol (loan)	2017–18	Ukrainian Premier League	10	0	0	0	—		—		10	0
Mariupol (loan)	2018–19	Ukrainian Premier League	26	5	0	0	4 (Note: Appearance(s) in UEFA Europa League)	1	—		30	6
Mariupol (loan)	Total		36	5	0	0	4	1	—		40	6
Dnipro-1 (loan)	2020–21	Ukrainian Premier League	14	0	1	0	—		—		15	0
Dnipro-1	2021–22	Ukrainian Premier League	14	5	2	1	—		—		16	6
Dnipro-1	2022–23	Ukrainian Premier League	30	6	0	0	10 (Note: Two appearances in UEFA Europa League, eight appearances and two goals in UEFA Conference League)	2	—		40	8
Dnipro-1	2023–24	Ukrainian Premier League	25	5	1	0	5 (Note: One appearance in UEFA Champions League, two appearances in UEFA Europa League, two appearances and one goal in UEFA Conference League)	1	—		31	6
Dnipro-1	Total		83	16	4	1	15	2	—		102	20
Dynamo Kyiv	2024–25	Ukrainian Premier League	19	3	3	1	11 (Note: Six appearances and two goals in UEFA Champions League, five appearances and one goal in UEFA Europa League)	3	—		33	7
Dynamo Kyiv	2025–26	Ukrainian Premier League	29	2	5	2	11 (Note: Three appearances in UEFA Champions League, two appearances in UEFA Europa League, six appearances in UEFA Conference League)	0	—		45	4
Dynamo Kyiv	2026–27	Ukrainian Premier League	6	1	1	0	4 (Note: Three appearances in UEFA Europa League, one appearance in UEFA Conference League)	0	—		11	1
Dynamo Kyiv	Total		54	6	9	3	26	3	—		89	12
Career total			180	27	13	4	45	7	0	0	238	38

=== International ===
As of match played 5 October 2026

National team	Year	Caps	Goals
Ukraine	2022	5	0
Ukraine	2023	3	0
Ukraine	2024	2	0
Ukraine	2025	2	0
Ukraine	2026	3	0
Total		15	0

== Honours ==
Shakhtar

- Ukrainian Premier League: 2019–20

Dynamo Kyiv

- Ukrainian Premier League: 2024–25
- Ukrainian Cup: 2025–26

Individual

- Ukrainian Premier League Top Assists Provider: 2022-23 (10)
