= 2026–27 Macedonian Second Football League =

Macedonian Second League
- Season: 2026–27

The 2025–26 Macedonian Second Football League is the 35th season of the Macedonian Second Football League, the second division in the Macedonian football league system. This is the fifth season since the league was returned to the united league format, for the first time since 2016–17 season. The season began on 15 August 2026 and will be concluded on 22 May 2027.

== Participating teams ==
Location of teams in 2026–27 Macedonian Second League

Club	City	Stadium	Capacity
Belasica	Strumica	Stadion Blagoj Istatov	6,500
AP Brera	Strumica	Stadion Blagoj Istatov	6,500
Detonit Plachkovica	Radovish	Gradski stadion Radovish	2,000
Euromilk	Skopje	Stadion Gorno Lisiche	500
Kamjani	Kamenjane	Stadion Kamjan	899
Kozhuf	Gevgelija	Gradski stadion Gevgelija	1,400
Makedonija G.P.	Skopje	Gjorče Petrov Stadium	3,000
Novaci	Novaci	Stadion Novaci	500
Ohrid	Ohrid	SRC Biljanini Izvori	3,000
Osogovo	Kochani	Stadion Nikola Mantov	5,000
Pelister	Bitola	Petar Miloshevski Stadium	10,000
Rabotnichki	Skopje	National Arena Toshe Proeski	33,011
Shkupi	Skopje	Chair Stadium	7,500
Teteks	Tetovo	AMS Sportski Centar Tetovo	2,000

== League table ==
Pos	Team	Pld	W	D	L	GF	GA	GD	Pts	Promotion, qualification or relegation
1	Ohrid	12	10	1	1	28	7	+21	31	Promotion to the Macedonian First League
2	Pelister	12	8	4	0	24	4	+20	28	Promotion to the Macedonian First League
3	Rabotnički	11	9	0	2	25	6	+19	27	Qualification for the Macedonian First Football League play-off
4	Kamjani	12	6	2	4	15	17	−2	20	
5	Brera	11	5	3	3	19	9	+10	18	
6	Kozhuf	12	4	5	3	15	17	−2	17	
7	Teteks	12	4	4	4	20	17	+3	16	
8	Belasica	12	3	7	2	12	11	+1	16	
9	Makedonija G.P.	12	4	3	5	7	9	−2	15	
10	Detonit Plachkovica	12	3	3	6	9	19	−10	12	
11	Novaci	12	3	2	7	10	19	−9	11	
12	Osogovo	12	2	4	6	8	14	−6	10	Relegation to the Macedonian Third League
13	Euromilk	12	1	4	7	8	16	−8	7	Relegation to the Macedonian Third League
14	Shkupi	12	0	0	12	1	36	−35	0	Relegation to the Macedonian Third League

Updated to match(es) played on 22 November 2026. Source: FFM.mk, MacedonianFootball.com
Rules for classification: 1) Points; 2) Head-to-head points; 3) Head-to-head goal difference; 4) Head-to-head away goals scored

== Results ==
Home \ Away	BEL	APB	DPL	EUR	KAM	KOZ	MGP	NOV	OHR	OSO	PEL	RAB	SKU	TET
Belasica	—		1–1				1–1			1–0			2–0	2–2
Brera	0–0	—		2–0	2–1	0–1	1–0	4–1					7–0	
Detonit Plachkovica		1–0	—	0–0		1–1			0–2	2–1				
Euromilk	0–0			—		1–3	0–1	0–0					4–0	
Kamjani			1–0	2–1	—	1–1		1–0		2–1				3–1
Kozhuf	2–2					—		0–1			1–1		2–0	2–2
Makedonija G.P.			2–0		1–0		—		0–2	0–0	0–1	0–1		1–1
Novaci	0–1		3–1				2–0	—			0–2			1–4
Ohrid	2–1	2–2		2–1	4–0	5–1		2–1	—			1–0		
Osogovo		3–1		1–1		0–1		0–0		—		0–3		
Pelister	0–0	0–0	6–1		1–1				1–0	3–0	—	2–0		3–1
Rabotnički	3–1			1–0	5–1	3–0		4–1				—	4–0	
Shkupi			0–2		0–2		0–1		0–3	0–2	0–4		—	1–3
Teteks			2–0	4–0					0–3	0–0		0–1		—

Updated to match(es) played on 22 November 2026. Source: FFM.mk, MacedonianFootball.com
Legend: Blue = home team win; Yellow = draw; Red = away team win.

== See also ==
- 2026–27 Macedonian Football Cup
- 2026–27 Macedonian First Football League
