= Mevlan Adili =

Macedonian professional footballer

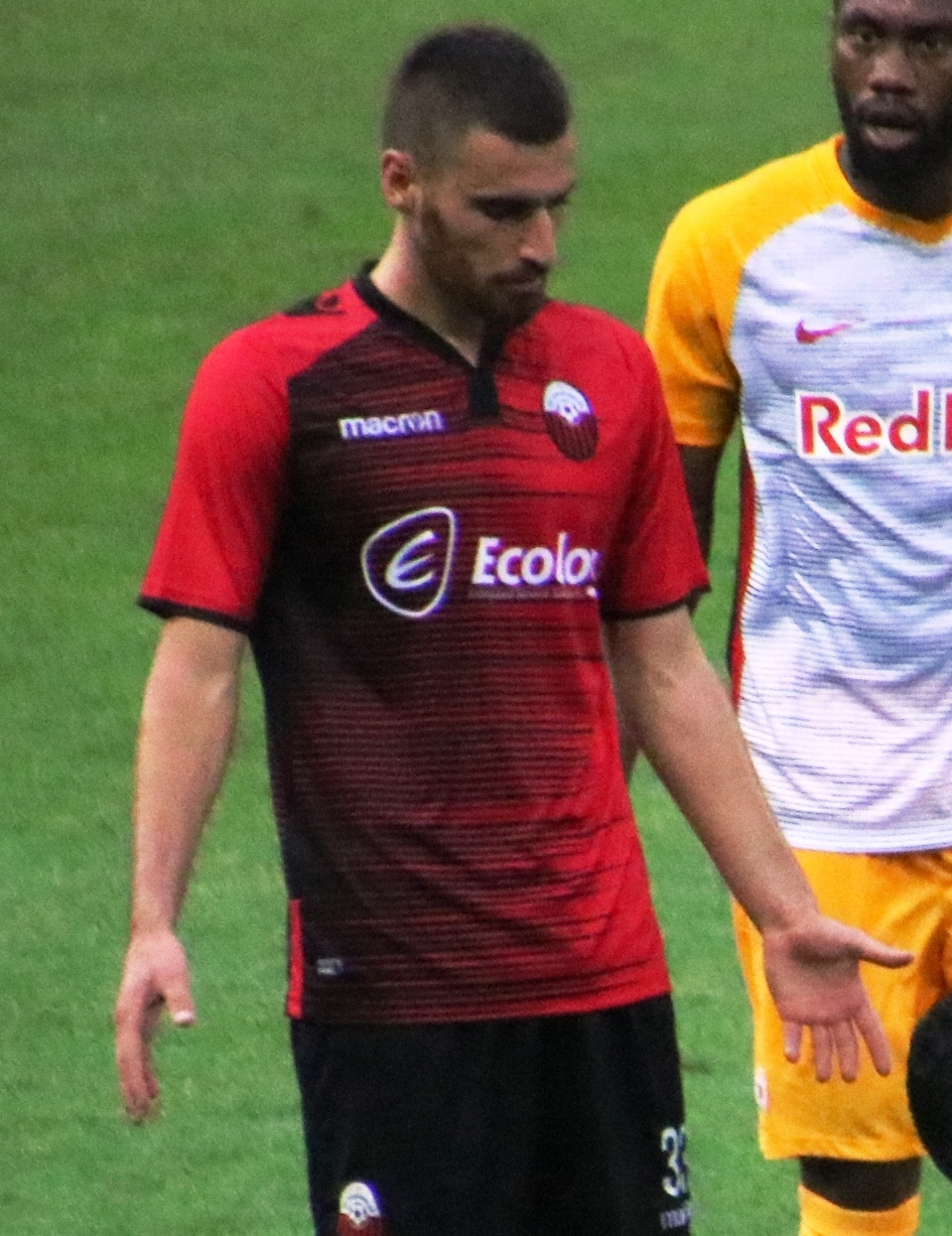

Personal information
- Date of birth: 30 March 1994 (age 32)
- Place of birth: Skopje, Macedonia
- Height: 1.86 m (6 ft 1 in)
- Position: Centre back

Team information
- Current team: Shkëndija Haraçinë

Youth career
- Beshiktash Çair
- –2012: Shkupi

Senior career*
Years	Team	Apps	(Gls)
2012–2015	Shkupi	52	(6)
2014–2015	Shkëndija	2	(0)
2015–2016	Shkupi	45	(2)
2017	UTA Arad	27	(1)
2018–2019	Shkëndija	22	(1)
2019	Žalgiris	9	(0)
2019	→ Žalgiris B	4	(0)
2019–2020	Shkupi	16	(0)
2020–2022	Vllaznia Shkodër	82	(1)
2022	SKA-Khabarovsk	7	(0)
2023	Bylis Ballsh	16	(1)
2023–2025	Shkëndija	54	(1)
2025–2026	Gjilani	33	(1)
2026–	Shkëndija Haraçinë	6	(0)

International career
2013–2014	Macedonia U21	2	(0)
- * Club domestic league appearances and goals as of 15 September 2026

Mevlan Adili (born 30 March 1994) is a Macedonian professional footballer who plays as a centre back for Shkëndija Haraçinë.

== Club career ==
Adili started his career at Albarsa and then continued to play in Macedonia for clubs like Shkëndija and Shkupi. In Romania he played in Liga II for UTA Arad.

== International career ==
He is also a member of the Macedonia U-21 national football team.

== Honours ==
=== Club ===
Shkendija

- Macedonian First League: 2017–18
- Macedonian Football Cup: 2017–18
