= Oleksandr Zubkov =

Ukrainian footballer (born 1996)

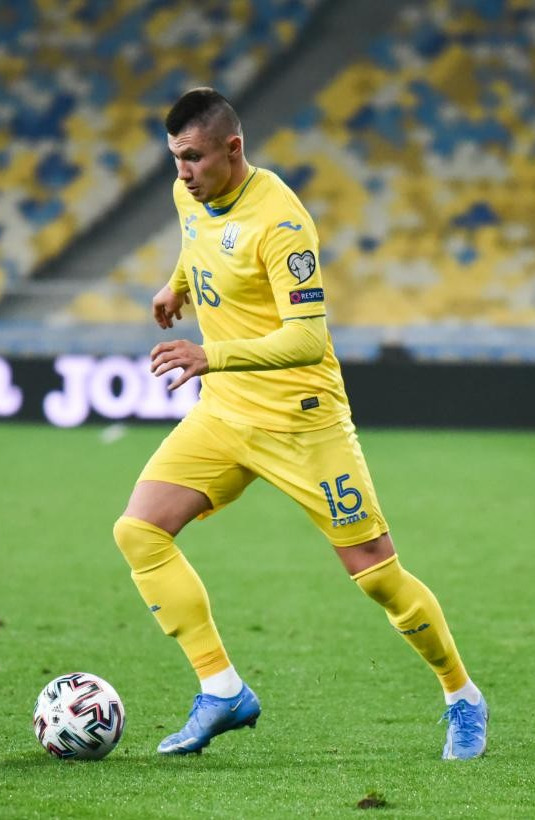
- Zubkov with Ukraine in 2021

Personal information
- Full name: Oleksandr Valeriyovych Zubkov
- Date of birth: 3 August 1996 (age 30)
- Place of birth: Makiivka, Ukraine
- Height: 1.82 m (6 ft 0 in)
- Positions: Winger; attacking midfielder

Team information
- Current team: AEK Athens
- Number: 10

Youth career
- 2009–2011: Olimpik Donetsk
- 2011–2014: Shakhtar Donetsk

Senior career*
Years	Team	Apps	(Gls)
2014–2020	Shakhtar Donetsk	17	(0)
2018–2019	→ Mariupol (loan)	22	(8)
2019–2020	→ Ferencváros (loan)	28	(9)
2020–2022	Ferencváros	45	(6)
2022–2025	Shakhtar Donetsk	54	(15)
2025–2026	Trabzonspor	45	(10)
2026–	AEK Athens	4	(0)

International career^{‡}
2013–2014	Ukraine U18	8	(1)
2014–2015	Ukraine U19	15	(5)
2015–2016	Ukraine U20	2	(2)
2016–2018	Ukraine U21	14	(5)
2020–	Ukraine	47	(3)
- * Club domestic league appearances and goals as of 21:00, 20 September 2026 (UTC) ‡ National team caps and goals as of 2 October 2026

Oleksandr Valeriyovych Zubkov (Ukrainian: Олекса́ндр Вале́рійович Зубко́в; born 3 August 1996) is a Ukrainian professional footballer who plays as a winger or attacking midfielder for Super League Greece club AEK Athens and the Ukraine national team.

== Club career ==
Zubkov is a product of Olimpik Donetsk and Shakhtar Donetsk academies.

=== Shakhtar Donetsk ===
In 2013, he signed a contract with Shakhtar, and played in the Shakhtar Donetsk reserves. Zubkov made his debut as the substituted player in the main-squad team in a match against Zorya Luhansk on 15 May 2016 in the Ukrainian Premier League.

=== Ferencváros ===
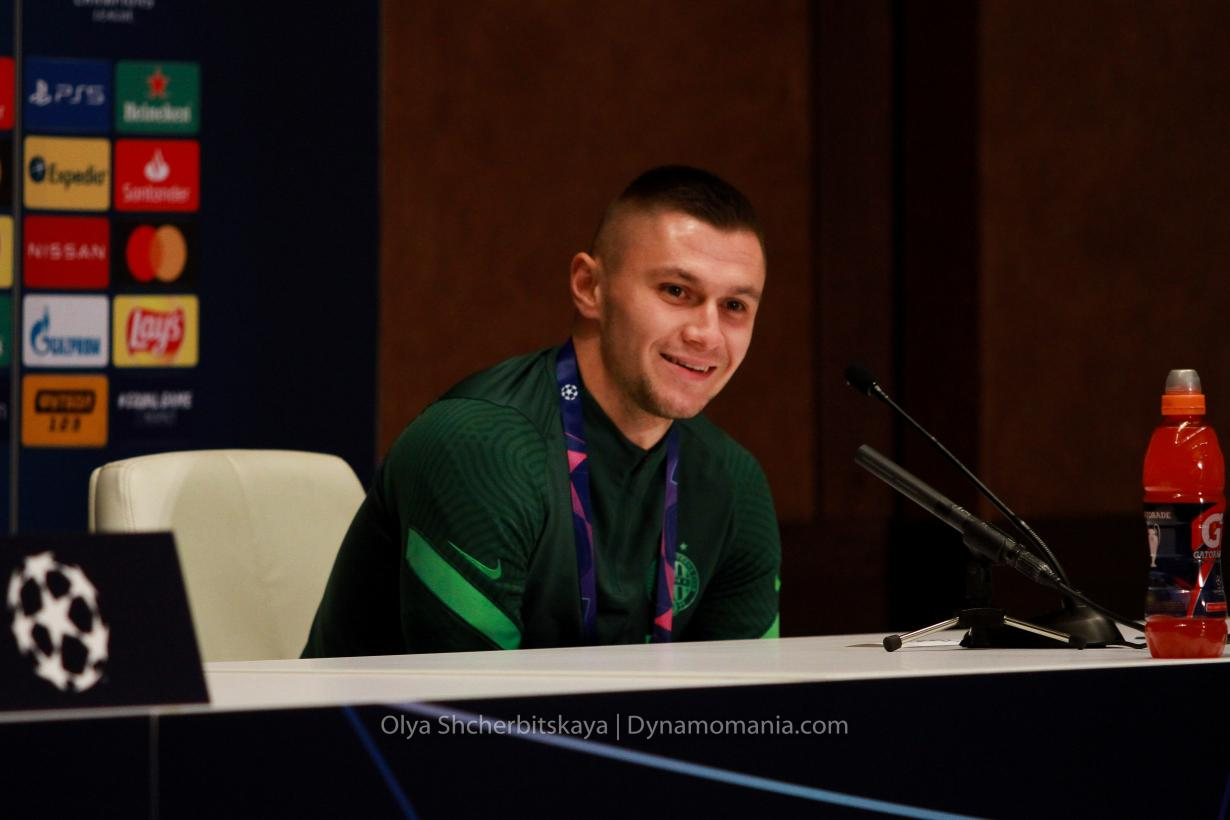
Zubkov during a UEFA Champions League pre-match press conference in 2020

At the end of spring of 2019 Zubkov joined Hungarian club Ferencváros on loan. After the successful loan which saw him become the club's top scorer, Ferencváros exercised the option to sign him permanently. The fee was believed to be around €1.5 million.

On 16 June 2020, he became champion with Ferencváros by beating Budapest Honvéd FC at the Hidegkuti Nándor Stadion on the 30th match day of the 2019–20 Nemzeti Bajnokság I season.

On 29 September 2020, he was member of the Ferencváros team which qualified for the 2020–21 UEFA Champions League group stage after beating Molde FK 3–3 on aggregate (away goals) at the Groupama Aréna.

=== Return to Shakhtar Donetsk ===
On 5 August 2022, Zubkov returned to Shakhtar Donetsk, by signing a contract until the summer of 2027. On 5 October, he scored his first Champions League goal in a 2–1 defeat against Real Madrid. On 11 October, he scored the leading goal for Shakhtar from a header against Real Madrid, before the latter managed to equalize in the 90+5th minute, in a match which ended in a 1–1 draw.

=== Trabzonspor ===
In February 2025, he joined Trabzonspor.

=== AEK Athens ===
On 3 June 2026, Zubkov signed a four-year contract with AEK Athens.

== International career ==
Zubkov made his debut for the Ukraine national team on 7 October 2020 in a friendly against France.

In June 2021, he is on the list of 26 players summoned by Andriy Shevchenko to compete for the UEFA Euro 2020.

In May 2024, he was on the list of 26 players summoned by Serhiy Rebrov for the UEFA Euro 2024.

== Career statistics ==
=== Club ===
As of match played 22 May 2026

Appearances and goals by club, season and competition
Club	Season	League			National cup (Note: Includes Ukrainian Cup, Magyar Kupa, Turkish Cup)		Europe		Other		Total	
Club	Season	Division	Apps	Goals	Apps	Goals	Apps	Goals	Apps	Goals	Apps	Goals
Shakhtar Donetsk	2015–16	Ukrainian Premier League	1	0	1	0	0	0	–		2	0
Shakhtar Donetsk	2016–17	Ukrainian Premier League	8	0	2	0	0	0	–		10	0
Shakhtar Donetsk	2017–18	Ukrainian Premier League	8	0	2	0	1 (Note: Appearance(s) in UEFA Champions League)	0	–		11	0
Shakhtar Donetsk	Total		17	0	5	0	1	0	–		23	0
Mariupol (loan)	2018–19	Ukrainian Premier League	22	8	0	0	0	0	–		22	8
Ferencváros (loan)	2019–20	Nemzeti Bajnokság I	28	9	0	0	14 (Note: Six appearances and one goal in UEFA Champions League, eight appearances in UEFA Europa League)	1	–		42	10
Ferencváros	2020–21	Nemzeti Bajnokság I	25	5	2	1	7	0	–		34	6
Ferencváros	2021–22	Nemzeti Bajnokság I	20	1	3	2	11 (Note: Seven appearances in UEFA Champions League, four appearances and one goal in UEFA Europa League)	1	–		34	4
Ferencváros	Total		45	6	5	3	18	1	–		68	10
Shakhtar Donetsk	2022–23	Ukrainian Premier League	17	5	0	0	9 (Note: Five appearances and two goals in UEFA Champions League, four appearances in UEFA Europa League)	2	–		26	7
Shakhtar Donetsk	2023–24	Ukrainian Premier League	25	5	4	1	8 (Note: Four appearances in UEFA Champions League, two appearances in UEFA Europa League)	0	–		37	6
Shakhtar Donetsk	2024–25	Ukrainian Premier League	12	5	1	0	8	2	–		21	7
Shakhtar Donetsk	Total		54	15	5	1	25	4	–		84	20
Trabzonspor	2024–25	Süper Lig	15	6	5	2	–		–		20	8
Trabzonspor	2025–26	Süper Lig	30	4	6	0	–		1 (Note: Appearance in Turkish Super Cup)	0	37	4
Trabzonspor	Total		45	10	11	2	–		1	0	57	12
Career total			166	38	15	4	58	6	0	0	239	49

=== International ===
As of match played 2 October 2026

Appearances and goals by national team and year
National team	Year	Apps	Goals
Ukraine	2020	5	0
Ukraine	2021	13	1
Ukraine	2022	6	1
Ukraine	2023	5	0
Ukraine	2024	8	0
Ukraine	2025	6	1
Ukraine	2026	4	0
Total		47	3

As of match played 16 November 2025. Ukraine score listed first, score column indicates score after each Zubkov goal.

List of international goals scored by Oleksandr Zubkov
No.	Date	Venue	Cap	Opponent	Score	Result	Competition
1	3 June 2021	Dnipro-Arena, Dnipro, Ukraine	10	Northern Ireland	1–0	1–0	Friendly
2	24 September 2022	Vazgen Sargsyan Republican Stadium, Yerevan, Armenia	23	Armenia	2–0	5–0	2022–23 UEFA Nations League B
3	16 November 2025	Polish Army Stadium, Warsaw, Poland	43	Iceland	1–0	2–0	2026 FIFA World Cup qualification

== Honours ==
Shakhtar Donetsk Youth

- UEFA Youth League runner-up: 2014–15

Shakhtar Donetsk

- Ukrainian Premier League: 2016–17, 2017–18
- Ukrainian Cup: 2015–16, 2016–17, 2017–18
- Ukrainian Super Cup: 2015, 2017

Ferencváros

- Nemzeti Bajnokság I: 2019–20, 2020–21, 2021–22
- Magyar Kupa: 2021–22

Trabzonspor

- Turkish Cup: 2025–26
