= Ihor Bykovskyi =

Ukrainian footballer

Personal information
- Full name: Ihor Ihorovych Bykovskyi
- Date of birth: 5 September 1996 (age 30)
- Place of birth: Mariupol, Ukraine
- Height: 1.77 m (5 ft 10 in)
- Position: Right winger

Team information
- Current team: Mariupol
- Number: 7

Youth career
- 2009–2013: Illichivets Mariupol

Senior career*
Years	Team	Apps	(Gls)
2013–2015	Illichivets Mariupol	1	(0)
2015	Shakhtar Donetsk	0	(0)
2015–2017	Arsenal Kyiv	18	(3)
2017–2018	Yarud Mariupol	15	(6)
2018–2019	Mariupol	1	(0)
2019–2020	Lokomotiv Yerevan	21	(8)
2020	Yarud Mariupol	8	(1)
2021	Hatne	0	(0)
2021–	Mariupol	59	(11)
- * Club domestic league appearances and goals as of 23 October 2024

Ihor Ihorovych Bykovskyi (Ukrainian: Ігор Ігорович Биковський; born 5 September 1996) is a Ukrainian professional footballer who plays as a right winger for Mariupol.

== Career ==
Bykovskyi is a product of the Illichivets Mariupol academy.

He made his début for Illichivets Mariupol as a substituted player in a match against Vorskla Poltava in the Ukrainian Premier League on 16 May 2015.
