= Dashmir Elezi =

Macedonian footballer (born 2004)

Personal information
- Date of birth: 21 November 2004 (age 21)
- Place of birth: Tetovo, Macedonia
- Height: 1.74 m (5 ft 9 in)
- Position: Forward

Team information
- Current team: Shkëndija Haraçinë
- Number: 99

Youth career
- –2020: Shkëndija

Senior career*
| Years | Team | Apps | (Gls) |
| 2020–2023 | Shkëndija | 63 | (10) |
| 2023 | Torpedo Kutaisi | 0 | (0) |
| 2023–2024 | Shkëndija | 18 | (2) |
| 2024 | Lokomotiva | 0 | (0) |
| 2024–2025 | Prishtina | 6 | (0) |
| 2025–2026 | Rabotnicki | 13 | (0) |
| 2026– | Shkëndija Haraçinë | 6 | (1) |

International career
| 2019 | North Macedonia U15 | 4 | (0) |
| 2019–2020 | North Macedonia U17 | 6 | (1) |
| 2022 | North Macedonia U18 | 1 | (0) |
| 2021–2022 | North Macedonia U19 | 10 | (1) |
| 2022– | North Macedonia U21 | 3 | (0) |
- * Club domestic league appearances and goals as of 14 September 2026

Dashmir Elezi (Macedonian: Дашмир Елези; born 21 November 2004) is a Macedonian professional footballer who plays as a forward for Shkëndija Haraçinë.

== Club career ==
Born in Tetovo, North Macedonia, Elezi joined Shkëndija at youth level. He was promoted to the first team squad in November 2020, and became the youngest goal-scorer in the top flight of Macedonian football when he scored on his debut in a 1–1 draw against Shkupi, a day after his sixteenth birthday.

He signed his first professional contract in June 2021. In October of the same year, he was named by English newspaper The Guardian as one of the best players born in 2004 worldwide.

In January 2022, a proposed transfer to Turkish side Gaziantep fell through. However, a year later, in January 2023, Elezi moved to Georgia to join Erovnuli Liga side Torpedo Kutaisi, signing a three-year contract. However 14 days later, Shkëndija announced that Elezi had gone back to North Macedonia due to personal problems and continue playing for Shkëndija.

== International career ==
Elezi has represented North Macedonia at youth international level.

== Personal life ==
Elezi's father, Skender, died in a car accident near Plovdiv, Bulgaria in December 2022.

== Career statistics ==
As of 11 January 2023.

Appearances and goals by club, season and competition
| Club | Season | League | | | Cup | | Continental | | Other | | Total | |
| Club | Season | Division | Apps | Goals | Apps | Goals | Apps | Goals | Apps | Goals | Apps | Goals |
|---|---|---|---|---|---|---|---|---|---|---|---|---|
| Shkëndija | 2020–21 | 1. MFL | 20 | 6 | 1 (Note: Appearances in the Macedonian Cup) | 0 | 0 | 0 | 0 | 0 | 21 | 6 |
| Shkëndija | 2021–22 | 1. MFL | 27 | 3 | 2 | 0 | 3 (Note: Two appearances in UEFA Champions League qualification, one appearance in UEFA Europa Conference League qualification) | 0 | 0 | 0 | 32 | 3 |
| Shkëndija | 2022–23 | 1. MFL | 13 | 1 | 3 | 2 | 3 (Note: Appearances in UEFA Europa Conference League qualification) | 0 | 0 | 0 | 19 | 3 |
| Shkëndija | Total | | 60 | 10 | 6 | 2 | 6 | 0 | 0 | 0 | 72 | 12 |
| Torpedo Kutaisi | 2023 | Erovnuli Liga | 0 | 0 | 0 | 0 | 0 | 0 | 0 | 0 | 0 | 0 |
| Career total | | | 60 | 10 | 2 | 0 | 6 | 0 | 0 | 0 | 68 | 10 |

== Honours ==
FK Shkëndija

- Macedonian First League: 2020–21
