= Yevhen Halchuk =

Ukrainian footballer (born 1992)

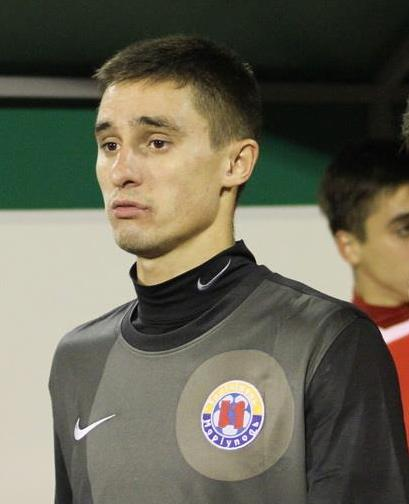

Personal information
- Full name: Yevhen Volodymyrovych Halchuk
- Date of birth: 5 March 1992 (age 34)
- Place of birth: Kramatorsk, Donetsk Oblast, Ukraine
- Height: 1.82 m (6 ft 0 in)
- Position: Goalkeeper

Team information
- Current team: UMF Afturelding
- Number: 1

Youth career
- 2005–2009: Shakhtar Donetsk

Senior career*
| Years | Team | Apps | (Gls) |
| 2009–2012 | Shakhtar Donetsk | 0 | (0) |
| 2009–2011 | → Shakhtar-3 Donetsk | 30 | (0) |
| 2012–2021 | Mariupol | 133 | (0) |
| 2021 | Inhulets Petrove | 12 | (0) |
| 2022 | Mariupol | 0 | (0) |
| 2023– | UMF Afturelding | 25 | (0) |

International career^{‡}
| 2009–2010 | Ukraine U18 | 13 | (0) |
| 2010–2011 | Ukraine U19 | 4 | (0) |
| 2013 | Ukraine U21 | 4 | (0) |
- * Club domestic league appearances and goals as of 10 November 2023 ‡ National team caps and goals as of 26 April 2023

Yevhen Volodymyrovych Halchuk (Ukrainian: Євген Володимирович Гальчук born 5 March 1992) is a Ukrainian professional football goalkeeper who plays for Icelandic club UMF Afturelding.

== Career ==
Halchuk is the member of different Ukrainian national youth football teams. Last time he was called up as member of the Ukraine national under-21 football team by coach Serhiy Kovalets in summer of 2013.
