= Oleksiy Bykov =

Ukrainian football player

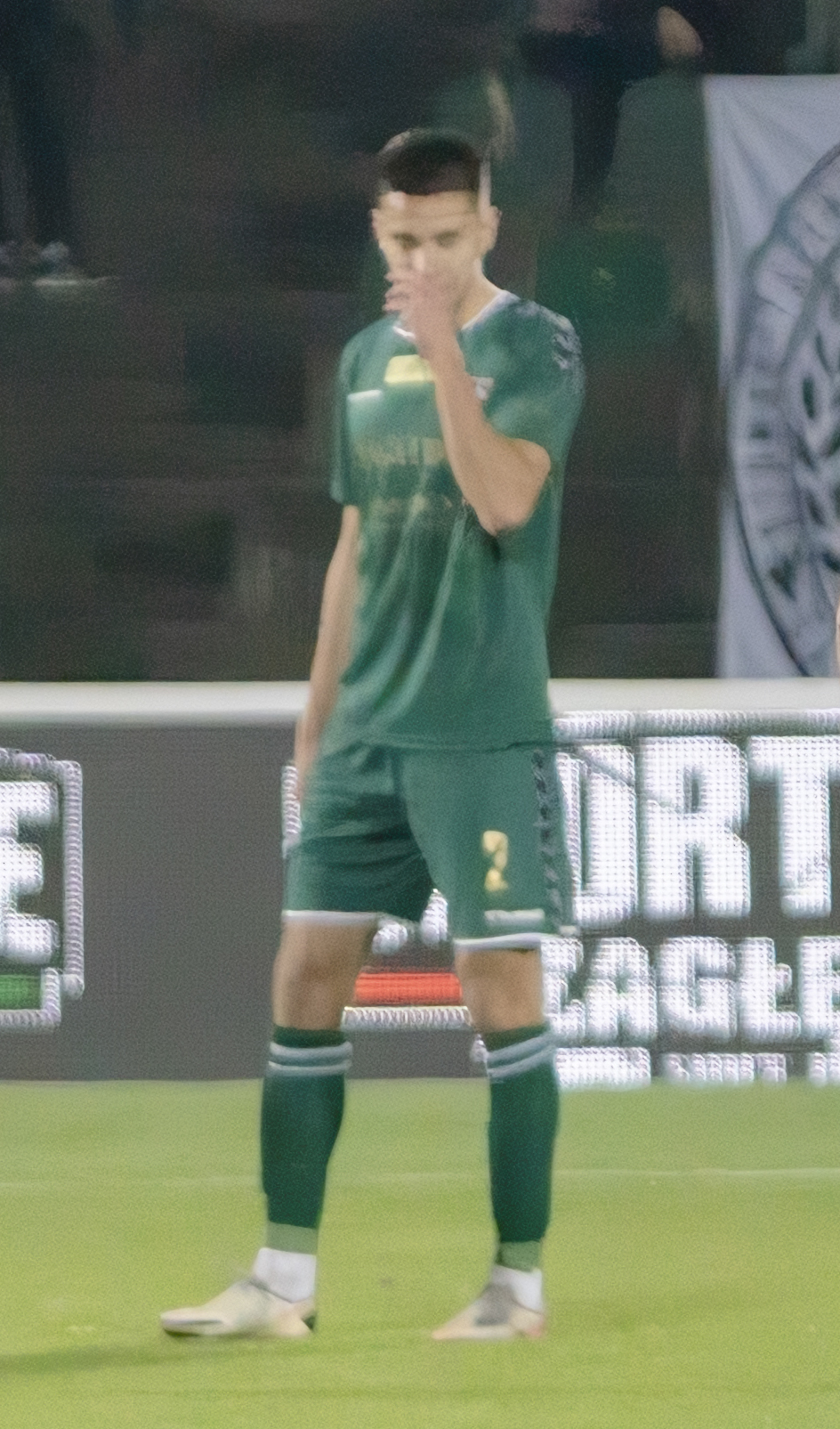
- Bykow with Zagłębie Sosnowiec in 2022

Personal information
- Full name: Oleksiy Oleksiyovych Bykov
- Date of birth: 29 March 1998 (age 28)
- Place of birth: Khartsyzk, Ukraine
- Height: 1.87 m (6 ft 2 in)
- Position: Centre-back

Team information
- Current team: Marsaxlokk

Youth career
- 2010–2015: Shakhtar Donetsk

Senior career*
| Years | Team | Apps | (Gls) |
| 2015–2016 | Shakhtar Donetsk | 0 | (0) |
| 2016–2017 | Oleksandriya | 0 | (0) |
| 2018– | Mariupol | 61 | (0) |
| 2021–2022 | → Lokomotiv Plovdiv (loan) | 15 | (0) |
| 2022 | → KA (loan) | 8 | (0) |
| 2022–2023 | → Zagłębie Sosnowiec (loan) | 19 | (0) |
| 2023–2025 | Zagłębie Sosnowiec | 30 | (4) |
| 2025–2026 | Chojniczanka Chojnice | 27 | (1) |
| 2026– | Marsaxlokk | 0 | (0) |

International career
| 2018–2019 | Ukraine U21 | 9 | (0) |
- * Club domestic league appearances and goals as of 11:07, 31 May 2026 (UTC)

Oleksiy Oleksiyovych Bykov (Ukrainian: Олексій Олексійович Биков; born 29 March 1998) is a Ukrainian professional footballer who plays as a centre-back for Maltese Premier League club Marsaxlokk.

== Club career ==
He made his Ukrainian Premier League debut for Mariupol on 18 March 2018 in a game against Shakhtar Donetsk.

On 18 July 2022, he joined Polish I liga club Zagłębie Sosnowiec on a loan until the end of the season, with an option to buy. He joined the club on a permanent basis on 4 July the following year, signing a one-year contract. In April 2024, he underwent a ligament reconstruction procedure after suffering a PCL injury. In spite of this, and the club's relegation to the third division, Bykov's contract was extended for another year on 15 June 2024. He was released by Zagłębie at the end of June 2025.

On 27 June 2025, Bykov agreed to a season-long deal with II liga club Chojniczanka Chojnice.

In June 2026, Bykov signed with Maltese Premier League club Marsaxlokk.
