= Rustam Khudzhamov =

Ukrainian footballer

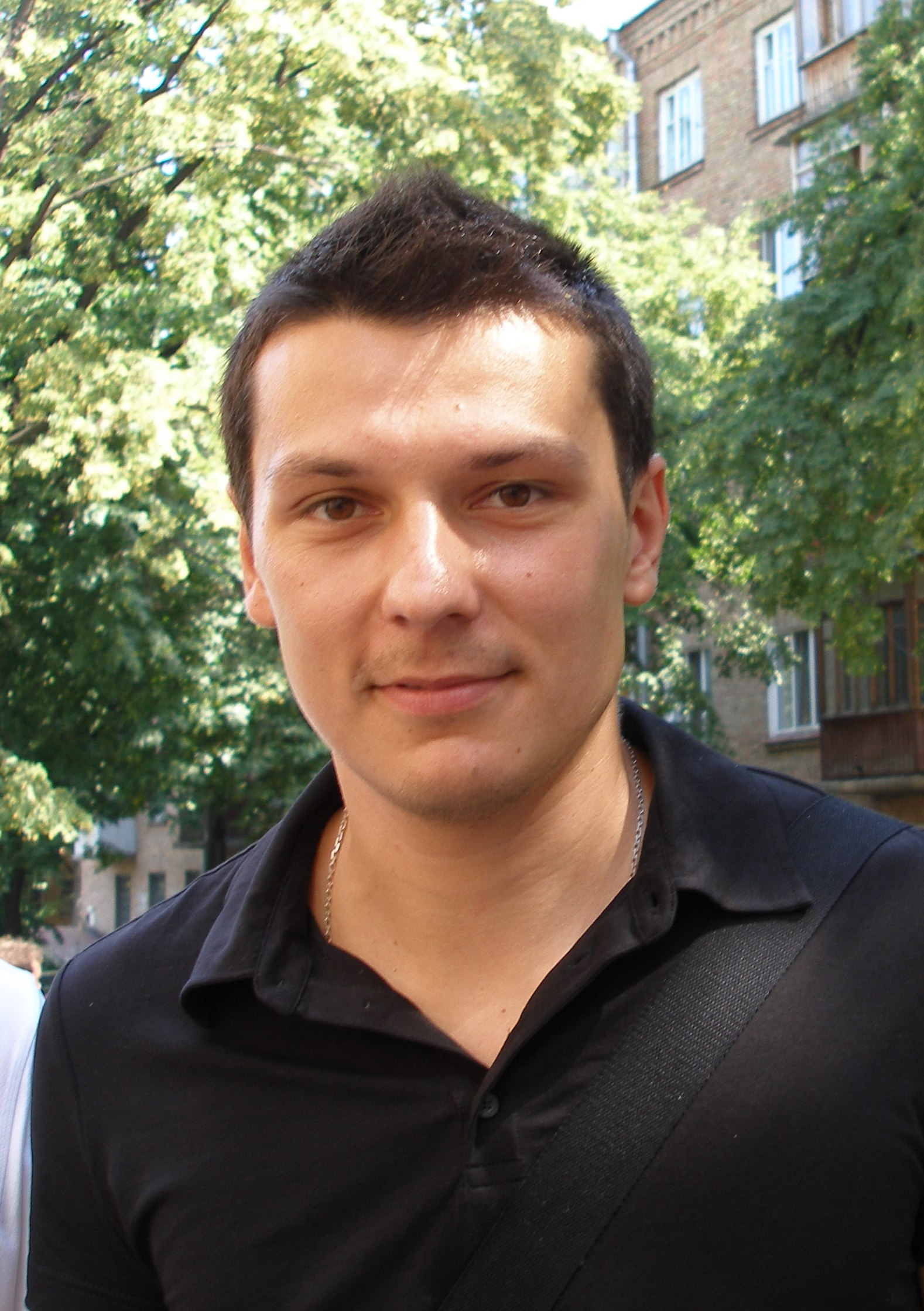
- Khudzhamov in 2009

Personal information
- Full name: Rustam Makhmudkulovych Khudzhamov
- Date of birth: 5 October 1982 (age 44)
- Place of birth: Skvyra, Ukrainian SSR, Soviet Union
- Height: 1.91 m (6 ft 3 in)
- Position: Goalkeeper

Youth career
- Dynamo Kyiv

Senior career*
Years	Team	Apps	(Gls)
1999–2005	Dynamo Kyiv	0	(0)
2000–2004	→ Dynamo-3 Kyiv	31	(0)
2001–2005	→ Dynamo-2 Kyiv	85	(0)
2005	→ Zakarpattya Uzhhorod (loan)	10	(0)
2006–2008	Kharkiv	59	(0)
2008–2012	Shakhtar Donetsk	10	(0)
2011	→ Metalurh Donetsk (loan)	0	(0)
2012	→ Illichivets Mariupol (loan)	10	(0)
2012–2014	Illichivets Mariupol	48	(0)
2014–2016	Shakhtar Donetsk	0	(0)
2015	→ Zorya Luhansk (loan)	1	(0)
2015	→ Metalist Kharkiv (loan)	6	(0)
2016–2019	Mariupol	69	(0)
Total		329	(0)

International career^{‡}
2003	Ukraine-21	2	(0)
2009	Ukraine	1	(0)

Managerial career
- 2022: Polissya Zhytomyr (goalkeeping coach)
- 2023–: Ukraine (goalkeeping coach)
- * Club domestic league appearances and goals as of 1 April 2020 ‡ National team caps and goals as of 30 May 2020

Rustam Makhmudkulovych Khudzhamov (Ukrainian: Рустам Махмудкулович Худжамов; born 5 October 1982, in Skvyra, Ukrainian SSR, Soviet Union) is a Ukrainian retired football goalkeeper.

== Club career ==
On 25 May 2008, Rustam signed a 5-year contract with Shakhtar Donetsk for a fee of 582,000 hryvnia (approximately 80,000 euro). His first action at the club was replacing former No.1 Andriy Pyatov as the starting goalkeeper and saving a penalty in the 5–3 penalty win over Dynamo Kyiv in the Ukrainian Super Cup final. But lost it after conceding two questionable goals versus Premier League new-boys FC Lviv, and is restricted to only cup matches.

In May 2020 he announced his retirement from a playing career due a prolonged knee injury.

== International career ==
Rustam Khudzhamov made his debut for the Ukraine national football team in a friendly on 11 February 2009 against Serbia which Ukraine won 1–0.

== Personal life ==
Khudzhamov is an ethnic Crimean Tatar. His name in Crimean Tatar language is Rüstam Mahmüdkuli Hucamov.

== Honours ==
Shakhtar Donetsk

- Ukrainian Cup: 2011
- Ukrainian Super Cup: 2008
- UEFA Cup: 2008–09
