= Emeka Umeh =

Nigerian footballer (born 1999)

Personal information
- Full name: Chukwuemeka Gozie Umeh
- Date of birth: 24 October 1999 (age 27)
- Place of birth: Kaduna State, Nigeria
- Height: 2.05 m (6 ft 9 in)
- Position: Centre forward

Youth career
- Zico FC (Kaduna)

Senior career*
Years	Team	Apps	(Gls)
2016–2018	Kaduna United	91	(66)
2019	Plateau United	25	(22)
2020–2021	AS Trenčín	14	(2)
- * Club domestic league appearances and goals

Chukwuemeka Gozie Umeh (born 24 October 1999) is a Nigerian professional footballer who last played as a forward for Slovak club AS Trenčín.

== Club career ==
=== Early career ===
Born in Sabo, Nigeria, Umeh started playing football at a young age, with Zico FC a grassroot team in Kaduna State.

=== AS Trenčín ===
In July 2018, Umeh joined Slovak side AS Trenčín. He scored his first goal in the Fortuna liga for AS Trenčín against iClinic Sereď. He was released from the club in the winter of 2020–21, when his contract was not renewed.
