= Dmytro Myshnyov =

Ukrainian footballer

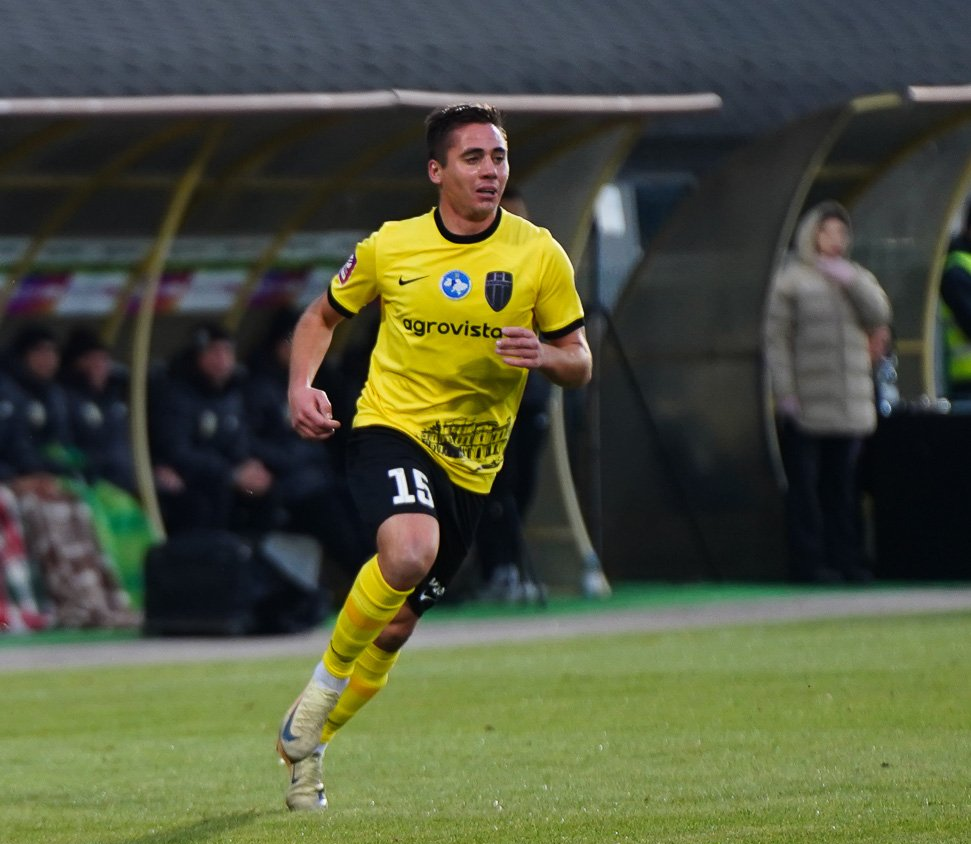
- Myshnyov playing for Oleksandriya in 2024

Personal information
- Full name: Dmytro Oleksandrovych Myshnyov
- Date of birth: 26 January 1994 (age 32)
- Place of birth: Krasnyi Lyman, Ukraine
- Height: 1.68 m (5 ft 6 in)
- Position: Central midfielder

Team information
- Current team: Oleksandriya
- Number: 9

Youth career
- 2007–2009: Monolit Illichivsk
- 2010–2011: Illichivets Mariupol

Senior career*
Years	Team	Apps	(Gls)
2011–2022	Mariupol	211	(16)
2022–2024	Zorya Luhansk	47	(3)
2024–26	Oleksandriya	61	(2)
2026-	Obolon Kyiv	6	(0)

International career^{‡}
2012	Ukraine U18	10	(2)
2012–2013	Ukraine U19	13	(0)
2014	Ukraine U20	1	(0)
2014–2016	Ukraine U21	20	(1)
- * Club domestic league appearances and goals as of 3 June 2026 ‡ National team caps and goals as of 7 October 2021

Dmytro Oleksandrovych Myshnyov (Ukrainian: Дмитро Олександрович Мишньов; born 26 January 1994) is a Ukrainian professional footballer who plays as a central midfielder for the Ukrainian Premier League club Oleksandriya.

== Career ==
He is a product of Mariupol sportive school.

He made his debut for Illichivets Mariupol in the Ukrainian Premier League on 30 November 2013.

On 2022 he signed for Zorya Luhansk.

On 11 July 2024, Myshnyov joined Oleksandriya on a two-year deal.

== Honours ==
Mariupol

- Ukrainian First League: 2016–17
