= KF Shkëndija Haraçinë =

Shkëndija 77
- Full name: KF Shkëndija Haraçinë 77
- Founded: 1977; 49 years ago
- Ground: Čair Stadium, Skopje
- Capacity: 4,500
- Chairman: Sulejman Alimi
- Manager: Berat Imeri
- League: Macedonian First League
- 2025–26: Macedonian Second League, 3rd (promoted)
- Website: shkendija77.com

KF Shkëndija Haraçinë 77 (Macedonian: ФК Шкендија Арачиново 77, romanized: FK Škendija Aračinovo 77) is a football club based in the village of Aračinovo, Skopje, North Macedonia. They currently competing in the Macedonian First League.

== History ==
The club was founded in 1977.

== Honours ==
(North Macedonia) Macedonian Second League:

- Runners-up (1): 1994–95
- Third place (2): 1995–96, 2025–26

(North Macedonia) Macedonian Third League North:

- Champions (1): 2024–25
- Runners-up (1): 2023–24

== Players ==
=== Current squad ===
As of 15 September 2026

Note: Flags indicate national team as defined under FIFA eligibility rules; some limited exceptions apply. Players may hold more than one non-FIFA nationality.

No.	Pos.	Nation	Player
1	GK	MKD	Antonio Stolevski
3	DF	MKD	Martin Todorov
4	MF	MKD	Suhejb Rushiti
5	DF	MKD	Mevlan Adili
6	DF	MKD	Esmin Lichina
7	FW	MKD	Vildan Kerim
8	MF	MKD	Amir Nuhija
9	FW	MKD	Dashmir Elezi
10	MF	MKD	Besir Demiri (captain)
11	FW	MKD	Fikret Livareka
12	GK	MKD	Hadis Velii
13	DF	ALB	Esin Hakaj
14	MF	MKD	Andrej Arizankoski
17	FW	MKD	Bujar Iljazi

No.	Pos.	Nation	Player
19	DF	MKD	Hristijan Dimov
20	MF	MKD	Xhihan Adili
21	MF	MKD	Mile Todorov
22	MF	MKD	Enis Fazlagikj
23	FW	MKD	Ariton Mehmedi
30	DF	MKD	Nikolche Sharkoski
33	FW	MKD	Remzifaik Selmani
70	FW	MKD	Marko Simonovski
77	MF	MKD	Lavdrim Kasami
99	GK	MKD	Behar Shukriji
—	DF	RWA	Abdul Rwatubyaye
—	MF	MKD	Rinor Ajdini
—	MF	MKD	Nijaz Jusufi

=== Youth players ===
Players from the U19 Youth Team that have been summoned with the first team in the current season.

Note: Flags indicate national team as defined under FIFA eligibility rules; some limited exceptions apply. Players may hold more than one non-FIFA nationality.

No.	Pos.	Nation	Player
2	MF	MKD	Abdula Jashari
32	DF	MKD	Visar Sula

=== Current technical staff ===
As of 1 August 2026

Position	Name
Head coach	(North Macedonia) Berat Imeri
Assistant coach	(North Macedonia) Burim Sadiki
Goalkeeper coach	(North Macedonia) Stefan Jakimovski
Goalkeeper coach	(North Macedonia) Erkan Murseli
Fitness coach	(North Macedonia) Tome Arsovski
Physiotherapist	(North Macedonia) Jasir Kaljisi
Doctor	(North Macedonia) Ramush Sali
Security person	(North Macedonia) Avdiraman Isufi
Administrator	(North Macedonia) Bujar Jaji
Club representative	(North Macedonia) Nehat Jusufi

== Notable players ==
- (North Macedonia) Zekirija Ramadani
