= Besir Demiri =

Macedonian professional footballer

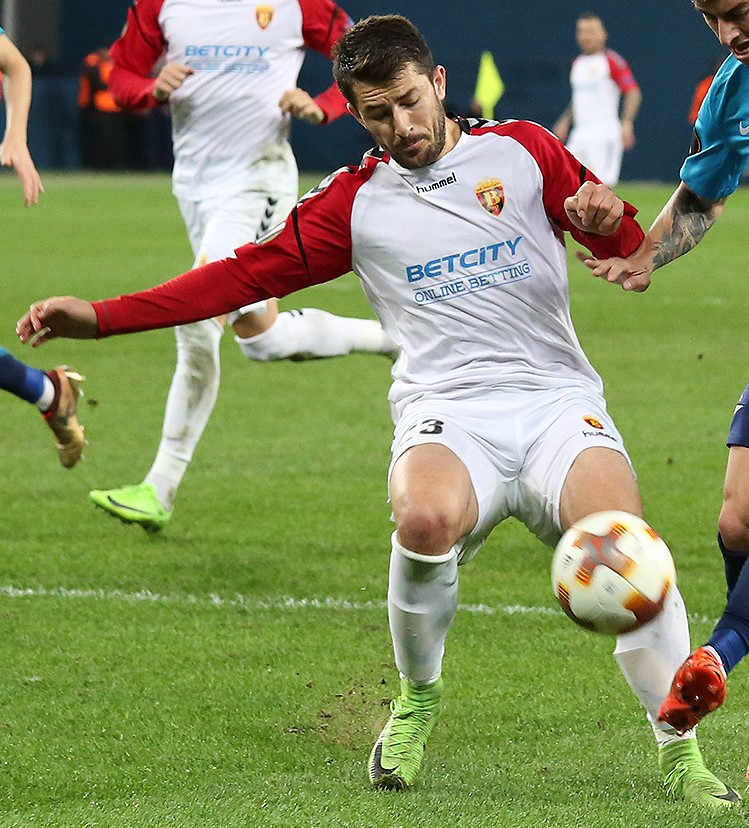

Personal information
- Date of birth: 1 August 1994 (age 32)
- Place of birth: Skopje, Macedonia
- Height: 1.76 m (5 ft 9 1/2 in)
- Positions: Defensive midfielder; left-back

Team information
- Current team: Shkëndija Haraçinë

Youth career
- 2009–2013: Shkupi

Senior career*
Years	Team	Apps	(Gls)
2012–2014	Shkupi		
2014–2016	Shkëndija	52	(3)
2017–2018	Vardar	26	(0)
2018–2019	Mariupol	33	(0)
2019–2020	Žilina	21	(2)
2020–2021	Kukësi	33	(0)
2021–2022	Dinamo Tirana	33	(1)
2022–2023	Shkupi	11	(1)
2023–2024	Gjilani	12	(0)
2024–2026	Rabotnički	54	(4)
2026–	Shkëndija Haraçinë	7	(1)

International career
2014–2017	Macedonia U21	16	(1)
2016	Macedonia	2	(0)
- * Club domestic league appearances and goals as of 16 June 2026

Besir Demiri (born 1 August 1994) is a Macedonian professional footballer who plays as a defensive midfielder or left-back for Shkëndija Haraçinë.

Demiri began his football development at Shkupi, progressing through the club's youth system before making his senior debut in 2012. After spells with Shkupi and Shkëndija, where he established himself as a regular first-team player, he joined Vardar in 2017. He later played abroad for Mariupol in Ukraine and Žilina in Slovakia, before returning to the Balkans with Kukësi and Dinamo Tirana in Albania. Demiri rejoined Shkupi in 2022, spent the 2023–24 season with Gjilani, and signed for Rabotnički in 2024.

At international level, Demiri represented Macedonia at under-21 level between 2014 and 2017, earning 16 caps and scoring once. He made his senior debut for the Macedonia national team in 2016, winning two caps, before declaring his intention to play senior international football for Albania in September 2018.

== Club career ==
Demiri started playing football in the youth club of Shkupi Čair, and in 2013 he also joined their first team to perform in the Macedonian Second Football League. After two years playing for Shkupi, in January 2015 he transferred to Shkendija Tetovo to play in Macedonia's top division. In December 2016 he transferred to Vardar Skopje. In February 2018 he moved to Ukrainian Premier League club FC Mariupol.

== International career ==
=== Macedonia ===
Demiri made his debut for the Macedonia U21 national team in 2014 and he has been a regular player in the following 2 years after that. On 27 June 2016, after his great performance and debut goal in the Euro U21 qualifying match against Ukraine U21, Demiri received an additional call up for the Macedonia A team. Only 2 days later, he already made his debut for the National Team in the 3–1 win against Azerbaijan where he was substituted in for Bojan Najdenov in the 83rd minute.

=== Albania ===
On 2 September 2018, Demiri was called up to Albania national team for 2018–19 UEFA Nations League matches.
