= 2017–18 FC Karpaty Lviv season =

Karpaty Lviv
2017-18 season
- President: Petro Dyminsky
- Manager: Sergio Navarro (until 14 September 2017); Serhiy Zaytsev (until 19 November 2017); Oleh Boychyshyn (since 21 November 2017)
- Stadium: Ukraina Stadium, Lviv
- Premier League: 8th
- Ukrainian Cup: Round of 20 (1/16)
- Top goalscorer: League: Jorge Carrascal & Maryan Shved (6); All: Jorge Carrascal & Maryan Shved (6)
- Highest home attendance: 8,640 vs Veres; 10 September 2017
- Lowest home attendance: 1,241 vs Chornomorets; 31 March 2018

The 2017–18 season was Karpaty Lviv's 25th season in the top Ukrainian football league. Karpaty competed in Premier League and Ukrainian Cup.

== Players ==
=== Squad information ===
As of 31 May 2018

Squad no.	Name	Nationality	Position	Date of birth (age)
Goalkeepers
1	Roman Pidkivka	(Ukraine)	GK	9 May 1995 (aged 23)
23	Roman Mysak	(Ukraine)	GK	9 September 1999 (aged 18)
99	Oleksiy Shevchenko	(Ukraine)	GK	24 February 1992 (aged 26)
Defenders
4	Nika Sandokhadze	(Georgia (country))	DF	20 July 1994 (aged 23)
5	Andriy Nesterov	(Ukraine)	DF	2 July 1990 (aged 27)
24	Volodymyr Senytsya ^{List B}	(Ukraine)	DF	26 April 1997 (aged 21)
44	Artem Fedetskyi (Captain)	(Ukraine)	DF	26 April 1985 (aged 33)
54	Orest Lebedenko ^{List B}	(Ukraine)	DF	23 September 1998 (aged 19)
70	Ivan Lobay ^{List B}	(Ukraine)	DF	21 May 1996 (aged 22)
74	Nazar Vyzdryk ^{List B}	(Ukraine)	DF	27 April 1996 (aged 22)
82	Nazar Stasyshyn ^{List B}	(Ukraine)	DF	5 August 1997 (aged 20)
94	Denys Miroshnichenko	(Ukraine)	DF	11 October 1994 (aged 23)
Midfielders
8	Nazar Verbnyi ^{List B}	(Ukraine)	MF	26 July 1997 (aged 20)
10	Jorge Carrascal (on loan from Sevilla Atlético) ^{List B}	(Colombia)	MF	25 May 1998 (aged 20)
11	Ambrosiy Chachua	(Ukraine)	MF	2 April 1994 (aged 24)
17	Oleh Holodyuk	(Ukraine)	MF	2 January 1988 (aged 30)
21	Cristian Erbes	(Argentina)	MF	6 January 1990 (aged 28)
22	Andriy Busko ^{List B}	(Ukraine)	MF	20 May 1997 (aged 21)
33	Serhiy Myakushko	(Ukraine)	MF	15 April 1993 (aged 25)
40	Ihor Bohach ^{List B}	(Ukraine)	MF	3 May 1996 (aged 22)
48	Dmytro Klyots ^{List B}	(Ukraine)	MF	15 April 1996 (aged 22)
Forwards
7	Yhonatan Bedoya	(Colombia)	FW	17 October 1996 (aged 21)
9	Oleksiy Hutsulyak ^{List B}	(Ukraine)	FW	25 December 1997 (aged 20)
18	Rodrigo Vargas	(Bolivia)	FW	19 October 1994 (aged 23)
19	Maurício Cortés	(Colombia)	FW	9 February 1997 (aged 21)
20	Francisco Di Franco (on loan from Apollon Limassol)	(Argentina)	FW	28 January 1995 (aged 23)
32	Catriel Sánchez ^{List B}	(Argentina)	FW	17 July 1998 (aged 19)
35	Maryan Shved	(Ukraine)	FW	16 July 1997 (aged 20)
77	Viktor Khomchenko	(Ukraine)	FW	11 November 1994 (aged 23)
79	Leonid Akulinin	(Ukraine)	FW	7 March 1993 (aged 25)
81	Andriy Remenyuk ^{List B}	(Ukraine)	FW	3 February 1999 (aged 19)
85	Maksym Salamakha ^{List B}	(Ukraine)	FW	17 July 1996 (aged 21)

== Transfers ==
=== In ===
Date	Pos.	Player	Age	Moving from	Type	Fee	Source
Summer
23 June 2017	DF	(Argentina) Federico Pereyra	28	(Ukraine) Zirka Kropyvnytskyi	Transfer	Free	
28 June 2017	FW	(Ukraine) Roman Debelko	23	(Ukraine) Stal Kamianske	Transfer	Undisclosed	
1 July 2017	MF	(Ukraine) Yuriy Tkachuk	22	(Spain) Atlético Madrid B	Transfer	Undisclosed	
5 July 2017	MF	(Spain) Mario Arqués	25	(Spain) CD Alcoyano	Transfer	Undisclosed	
11 July 2017	FW	(Uruguay) Sebastián Ribas	29	(Mexico) Venados	Transfer	Undisclosed	
12 July 2017	DF	(Argentina) Guido Corteggiano	30	(Italy) Triestina	Transfer	Free	
12 July 2017	MF	(Colombia) Jorge Carrascal	19	(Spain) Sevilla Atlético	Transfer	Free	
1 August 2017	DF	(Ukraine) Artem Fedetskyi	32	(Germany) Darmstadt	Transfer	Free	
17 August 2017	FW	(Ukraine) Redvan Memeshev	24	(Ukraine) Volyn Lutsk	Transfer	Free	
18 August 2017	MF	(Argentina) Fernando Tissone	31	Unattached	Transfer	Free	
30 August 2017	FW	(Ukraine) Maryan Shved	20	(Spain) Sevilla Atlético	Transfer	Undisclosed	
6 September 2017	FW	(Ukraine) Leonid Akulinin	24	(Lithuania) Sūduva Marijampolė	Transfer	Free	
8 September 2017	MF	(Ukraine) Serhiy Myakushko	24	(Ukraine) Dynamo Kyiv	Transfer	Free	
15 September 2017	FW	(Ukraine) Oleksandr Hladkyy	30	(Ukraine) Dynamo Kyiv	Transfer	Free	
1 June 2017	GK	(Ukraine) Oleh Mozil	21	(Ukraine) Bukovyna Chernivtsi	Loan return		
1 June 2017	DF	(Ukraine) Andriy Markovych	21	(Belarus) Naftan Novopolotsk	Loan return		
1 June 2017	DF	(Ukraine) Vasyl Kravets	19	(Spain) CD Lugo	Loan return		
11 June 2017	DF	(Ukraine) Oleksandr Osman	21	(Ukraine) Dynamo Kyiv	Loan		
26 July 2017	FW	(Argentina) Francisco Di Franco	22	(Cyprus) Apollon Limassol	Loan		
Winter
22 January 2018	DF	(Georgia (country)) Nika Sandokhadze	23	(Georgia (country)) Samtredia	Transfer	Undisclosed	
31 January 2018	FW	(Colombia) Yhonatan Bedoya	21	(Spain) RCD Espanyol B	Transfer	Undisclosed	
31 January 2018	FW	(Colombia) Maurício Cortés	20	(Colombia) Independiente Medellín	Loan	Undisclosed	
22 February 2018	GK	(Ukraine) Oleksiy Shevchenko	25	(Ukraine) Zorya Luhansk	Transfer	Free	
23 February 2018	MF	(Argentina) Cristian Erbes	28	(Argentina) Chacarita Juniors	Transfer	Undisclosed	
2 March 2018	FW	(Bolivia) Rodrigo Vargas	23	(Bolivia) The Strongest	Transfer	Undisclosed	
1 January 2018	DF	(Ukraine) Andriy Markovych	22	(Ukraine) Rukh Vynnyky	Loan return		
1 January 2018	MF	(Ukraine) Artem Filimonov	23	(Cyprus) Pafos FC	Loan return		
1 January 2018	MF	(Ukraine) Yuriy Tkachuk	22	(Ukraine) Rukh Vynnyky	Loan return		
1 January 2018	MF	(Ukraine) Nazar Verbnyi	20	(Ukraine) Rukh Vynnyky	Loan return		
1 March 2018	FW	(Argentina) Catriel Sánchez	19	(Argentina) Talleres de Córdoba	Loan		

=== Out ===
Date	Pos.	Player	Age	Moving to	Type	Fee	Source
Summer
12 June 2017	DF	(Ukraine) Vasyl Kravets	19	(Spain) CD Lugo	Transfer	Undisclosed	
13 July 2017	DF	(Ukraine) Yevhen Zubeyko	27	(Ukraine) Chornomorets Odesa	Transfer	Free	
14 July 2017	DF	(Ukraine) Oleksiy Dytyatev	28	(Poland) Cracovia	Transfer	Free	
15 August 2017	GK	(Ukraine) Yevhen Borovyk	32	(Bulgaria) Cherno More Varna	Transfer	Free	
23 November 2017	DF	(Argentina) Guido Corteggiano	30	(Italy) Lecco	Transfer	Undisclosed	
1 June 2017	DF	(Ukraine) Mykola Matviyenko	21	(Ukraine) Shakhtar Donetsk	Loan return		
1 June 2017	FW	(Ukraine) Oleksandr Hladkyy	29	(Ukraine) Dynamo Kyiv	Loan return		
1 July 2017	DF	(Argentina) Cristian Paz	22	(Argentina) Temperley	Loan return		
7 July 2017	MF	(Ukraine) Artem Filimonov	23	(Cyprus) Pafos FC	Loan		
31 August 2017	MF	(Ukraine) Maksym Hrysyo	22	(Ukraine) Rukh Vynnyky	Loan return		
31 August 2017	MF	(Ukraine) Yuriy Tkachuk	22	(Ukraine) Rukh Vynnyky	Loan		
31 August 2017	MF	(Ukraine) Nazar Verbnyi	20	(Ukraine) Rukh Vynnyky	Loan		
31 August 2017	FW	(Uruguay) Sebastián Ribas	29	(Argentina) Patronato	Loan		
Winter
16 January 2018	MF	(Argentina) Fernando Tissone	31	(Portugal) C.D. Aves	Transfer	Undisclosed	
19 January 2018	MF	(Spain) Mario Arqués	26	(Spain) Alcoyano	Transfer	Undisclosed	
27 January 2018	DF	(Argentina) Federico Pereyra	29	(Chile) Huachipato	Transfer	Undisclosed	
February 2018	FW	(Brazil) China	21	Unattached	Transfer	Free	
25 February 2018	MF	(Ukraine) Ihor Khudobyak	32	(Kazakhstan) Akzhayik	Transfer	Free	
23 February 2018	MF	(Ukraine) Pavlo Ksyonz	31	(Poland) Sandecja Nowy Sącz	Transfer	Free	
24 March 2018	FW	(Ukraine) Oleksandr Hladkyy	30	(Ukraine) Chornomorets Odesa	Transfer	Free	
28 March 2018	MF	(Ukraine) Artem Filimonov	23	(Belarus) FC Gomel	Transfer	Free	
24 March 2018	FW	(Ukraine) Redvan Memeshev	24	(Ukraine) SC Dnipro-1	Transfer	Free	
1 January 2018	DF	(Ukraine) Oleksandr Osman	21	(Ukraine) Dynamo Kyiv	Loan return		
15 February 2018	MF	(Ukraine) Roman Debelko	24	(Estonia) Levadia Tallinn	Loan		
15 February 2018	MF	(Ukraine) Yuriy Tkachuk	22	(Estonia) Levadia Tallinn	Loan		
22 February 2018	DF	(Ukraine) Andriy Markovych	22	(Estonia) Nõmme Kalju	Loan		
2 March 2018	GK	(Ukraine) Oleh Mozil	21	(Ukraine) FC Lviv	Loan		
2 March 2018	MF	(Ukraine) Taras Zaviyskyi	22	(Ukraine) FC Lviv	Loan		

== Pre-season and friendlies ==
28 June 2017 Friendly	Karpaty Lviv	1 – 0	(Poland) Puszcza Niepołomice	Poland
18:00 EEST (UTC+03:00)	Khomchenko 51'	Report

1 July 2017 Friendly	Karpaty Lviv	2 – 0	(Poland) Zagłębie Sosnowiec	Poland
18:00 EEST (UTC+03:00)	Miroshnichenko 21'; Chachua 68'	Report

5 July 2017 Friendly	Karpaty Lviv	1 – 0	(Poland) GKS Katowice	Poland
18:00 EEST (UTC+03:00)	Chachua	Report

8 July 2017 Friendly	Karpaty Lviv	1 – 1	(Greece) AEK Athens	Poland
18:00 EEST (UTC+03:00)	Chachua 10'	Report	Giakoumakis 19'

8 October 2017 Friendly	Veres Rivne	2 – 0	Karpaty Lviv	Vynnyky
14:00 EEST (UTC+03:00)	Morozenko 81', 90' (pen.)	Report		Stadium: Bohdan Markevych Stadium

29 January 2018 Friendly	Karpaty Lviv	2 – 1	(Azerbaijan) Keşla	Turkey
16:30 EET (UTC+02:00)	Khudobyak 43'; Shved 58'	Report	Mammadli 57'

1 February 2018 Friendly	Karpaty Lviv	1 – 2	(Poland) Jagiellonia Białystok	Turkey
16:00 EET (UTC+02:00)	Chachua 58'	Report	Guti 19'; Sekulski 87'

4 February 2018 Friendly	Karpaty Lviv	1 – 2	(Bulgaria) Septemvri Sofia	Turkey
16:30 EET (UTC+02:00)	Mederhasov 81'	Report	Dos Reis 39'; Galchev 53'

8 February 2018 Friendly	Karpaty Lviv	1 – 1	(Serbia) Mladost Lučani	Turkey
16:00 EET (UTC+02:00)	Di Franco 22'	Report	Bado 71'

10 February 2018 Friendly	Karpaty Lviv	3 – 0	(Armenia) Shirak Gyumri	Turkey
16:00 EET (UTC+02:00)	Carrascal 47', 49' (pen.); Lobay 58'	Report

11 February 2018 Friendly	Karpaty Lviv	1 – 4	(Hungary) Debrecen	Turkey
16:00 EET (UTC+02:00)	Myakushko 77'	Report	Takács 49', 57', 66'; Bódi 74'

14 February 2018 Friendly	Karpaty Lviv	2 – 0	(Georgia (country)) Samgurali Tskaltubo	Turkey
16:00 EET (UTC+02:00)	Chachua 25'; Shved 45'	Report

24 March 2018 Friendly	Karpaty Lviv	0 – 0	FC Lviv	Lviv
14:00 EET (UTC+02:00)		Report		Stadium: Sokil Stadium

== Competitions ==
=== Overall ===
Competition	First match	Last match	Starting round	Final position	Record							
Competition	First match	Last match	Starting round	Final position	Pld	W	D	L	GF	GA	GD	Win %
Premier League	16 July 2017	19 May 2018	Matchday 1	8	32	8	13	11	28	45	−17	25.00
Cup	20 September 2017	20 September 2017	Round 3 (1/16)	Round 3 (1/16)	1	0	0	1	1	2	−1	0.00
Total					33	8	13	12	29	47	−18	24.24

Last updated: 19 May 2018
Source: Competitions

=== Premier League ===
==== League table ====
Pos	Team	Pld	W	D	L	GF	GA	GD	Pts	Qualification or relegation
8	FC Oleksandriya	22	4	11	7	19	23	−4	23	Qualification for the Relegation round
9	Zirka Kropyvnytskyi	22	4	7	11	13	31	−18	19	Qualification for the Relegation round
10	Karpaty Lviv	22	3	10	9	13	35	−22	19	Qualification for the Relegation round
11	Chornomorets Odesa	22	3	9	10	16	36	−20	18	Qualification for the Relegation round
12	Stal Kamianske	22	3	6	13	15	32	−17	15	Qualification for the Relegation round

Source: Ukrainian Premier League (in Ukrainian), UEFA, Soccerway
Rules for classification: 1) Points; 2) Goal difference; 3) Goals scored; 4) Head-to-head points; 5) Head-to-head goal difference; 6) Head-to-head goals scored; 7) Draw.

Team 1	Agg.	Team 2	1st leg	2nd leg
Zirka Kropyvnytskyi	1–5	Desna Chernihiv	1–1	0–4
Chornomorets Odesa	1–3	FC Poltava	1–0	0–3 (a.e.t.)

==== Relegation round ====
Pos	Team	Pld	W	D	L	GF	GA	GD	Pts	Qualification or relegation
7	FC Oleksandriya	32	10	15	7	32	27	+5	45	
8	Karpaty Lviv	32	8	13	11	28	45	−17	37	
9	Olimpik Donetsk	32	9	9	14	29	38	−9	36	
10	Zirka Kropyvnytskyi (R)	32	7	10	15	22	40	−18	31	Qualification for the Relegation play-offs
11	Chornomorets Odesa (Z)	32	6	11	15	26	49	−23	29	Qualification for the Relegation play-offs

Source: Ukrainian Premier League (in Ukrainian), UEFA, Soccerway
Rules for classification: 1) Points; 2) Goal difference; 3) Goals scored; 4) Head-to-head points; 5) Head-to-head goal difference; 6) Head-to-head goals scored; 7) Draw.
(R) Relegated; (Z) Readmitted in after withdrawal of FC Poltava. see 2017–18 Ukrainian Premier League #Relegation play-offs for more information.

Team 1	Agg.	Team 2	1st leg	2nd leg
Zirka Kropyvnytskyi	1–5	Desna Chernihiv	1–1	0–4
Chornomorets Odesa	1–3	FC Poltava	1–0	0–3 (a.e.t.)

==== Results summary ====
Overall								Home						Away					
Pld	W	D	L	GF	GA	GD	Pts	W	D	L	GF	GA	GD	W	D	L	GF	GA	GD
32	8	13	11	28	45	−17	37	5	4	7	19	27	−8	3	9	4	9	18	−9

Last updated: 19 May 2018.
Source: Competitive matches

==== Results by round ====
Round	1	2	3	4	5	6	7	8	9	10	11	12	13	14	15	16	17	18	19	20	21	22	23	24	25	26	27	28	29	30	31	32
Ground	H	H	A	H	A	H	A	H	A	H	A	A	A	H	A	H	A	H	A	H	A	H	H	A	H	H	A	A	H	A	A	H
Result	D	L	L	W	L	D	D	L	D	D	L	D	W	D	D	L	L	W	D	L	D	L	L	D	W	W	W	W	L	D	D	W
Position	6	10	11	8	9	10	10	10	10	10	11	11	8	9	9	11	11	11	11	10	9	10	11	11	10	9	9	9	9	9	9	8

Updated to match(es) played on 19 May 2018. Source: Competitive matches
A = Away; H = Home; W = Win; D = Draw; L = Loss

==== Matches ====
16 July 2017 1	Karpaty Lviv	1 – 1	Zirka Kropyvnytskyi	Lviv
17:00 EEST (UTC+3)	Chachua 5'; Miroshnichenko (yellow card) 87'; Nesterov (yellow card) 90+4'	Report	Zahalskyi 37' (pen.); Pryadun (yellow card) 79'	Stadium: Ukraina Stadium; Attendance: 7,520; Referee: Mykola Kryvonosov

23 July 2017 2	Karpaty Lviv	1 – 3	Vorskla Poltava	Lviv
17:00 EEST (UTC+3)	Ribas 17'; Pereyra (yellow card) 65'; Arqués (yellow card) 90+3'	Report	Kolomoyets 5'; Chesnakov (yellow card) 15'; Sharpar 49', (yellow card) 62'; Sklyar (yellow card) 80'; Odaryuk (yellow card) 86', (goal) 90+1'	Stadium: Ukraina Stadium; Attendance: 6,893; Referee: Ihor Paskhal

29 July 2017 3	Dynamo Kyiv	5 – 0	Karpaty Lviv	Kyiv
19:30 EEST (UTC+3)	Buyalskyi 8'; Tsyhankov 55', 62', 83'; Mbokani 58'; Khacheridi (yellow card) 71'; Kádár (yellow card) 74'	Report	Lebedenko (yellow card) 77'	Stadium: Olympic Stadium; Attendance: 7,489; Referee: Yaroslav Kozyk

5 August 2017 4	Karpaty Lviv	3 – 1	Stal Kamianske	Lviv
17:00 EEST (UTC+3)	Pidkivka (yellow card) 7'; Miroshnichenko (yellow card) 21'; Khudobyak (yellow card) 25', (goal) 30'; Fedetskyi (yellow card) 45'; Holodyuk (yellow card) 57' (yellow-red card) 73', (goal) 64'; Chachua (yellow card) 62'; Debelko 91' (pen.)	Report	E. Malakyan 8' (pen.); G. Malakyan (yellow card) 63'; Yakymiv (yellow card) 68'; Mykhaylychenko (yellow card) 86'; Khotsyanovskyi (yellow card) 87'	Stadium: Ukraina Stadium; Attendance: 4,372; Referee: Viktor Kopiievskyi

13 August 2017 5	FC Mariupol	3 – 0	Karpaty Lviv	Mariupol
17:00 EEST (UTC+3)	Koltsov (yellow card) 6'; Churko 10'; Lebedenko 18' (o.g.); Fomin (yellow card) 21'; Myshnyov (yellow card) 90'; Bolbat 90+3'	Report	Ribas (yellow card) 67'; Fedetskyi (yellow card) 84'	Stadium: Illichivets Stadium; Attendance: 9,120; Referee: Serhiy Boyko

20 August 2017 6	Karpaty Lviv	0 – 0	FC Oleksandriya	Lviv
17:00 EEST (UTC+3)	Lobay (yellow card) 60'; Pidkivka (yellow card) 60'; Holodyuk (yellow card) 60'; Chachua (yellow card) 60'; Lebedenko (yellow card) 60'	Report	Banada (yellow card) 60'	Stadium: Ukraina Stadium; Attendance: 4,220; Referee: Dmytro Kutakov

26 August 2017 7	Olimpik Donetsk	0 – 0	Karpaty Lviv	Kyiv
19:30 EEST (UTC+3)	Kravchenko (yellow card) 64'	Report	Lebedenko (yellow card) 70'	Stadium: Lobanovsky Dynamo Stadium; Attendance: 800; Referee: Dmytro Bondarenko

10 September 2017 8	Karpaty Lviv	1 – 6	Veres Rivne	Lviv
17:00 EEST (UTC+3)	Fedetskyi (yellow card) 33'; Pidkivka (yellow card) 45'; Lobay (yellow card) 49'; Carrascal (yellow card) 70', (goal) 87'; Corteggiano (yellow card) 75'; Miroshnichenko (yellow card) 75'	Report	Borzenko 34'; Serhiychuk 45' (pen.), 72'; Stepanyuk 53'; Kobin 76' (pen.); H.Pasich 83'	Stadium: Ukraina Stadium; Attendance: 8,640; Referee: Yaroslav Kozyk

17 September 2017 9	Zorya Luhansk	0 – 0	Karpaty Lviv	Zaporizhia
17:00 EEST (UTC+3)	Hrechyshkin (yellow card) 13'; Lunyov (yellow card) 63'; Andriyevskyi (yellow card) 72' (yellow-red card) 88'	Report	Nesterov (yellow card) 5'; Di Franco (yellow card) 32'; Holodyuk (yellow card) 66'; Fedetskyi (yellow card) 68'; Corteggiano (yellow card) 90+6'	Stadium: Slavutych-Arena; Attendance: 2,367; Referee: Vitaliy Romanov

24 September 2017 10	Karpaty Lviv	1 – 1	Chornomorets Odesa	Lviv
19:30 EEST (UTC+3)	Hladkyy 6' (pen.); Myakushko (yellow card) 62'; Nesterov (yellow card) 66'; Memeshev (yellow card) 79'; Ksyonz (yellow card) 89'	Report	Vasin (yellow card) 16'; Khoblenko 30'; N'Diaye (yellow card) 50'; Lyulka (yellow card) 54'; Wagué (yellow card) 57'; Zubeyko (yellow card) 74'	Stadium: Ukraina Stadium; Attendance: 1,262; Referee: Ivan Bondar

1 October 2017 11	Shakhtar Donetsk	2 – 0	Karpaty Lviv	Kharkiv
17:00 EEST (UTC+3)	Ferreyra 7'; Fedetskyi 65' (o.g.); Ordets (yellow card) 75'; Bernard (yellow card) 89'	Report	Fedetskyi (yellow card) 45+1'	Stadium: Metalist Stadium; Attendance: 10,480; Referee: Oleksandr Derdo

15 October 2017 12	Zirka Kropyvnytskyi	0 – 0	Karpaty Lviv	Kropyvnytskyi
14:00 EEST (UTC+3)	Kacharaba (yellow card) 77'; Drachenko (yellow card) 85'; Pryadun (yellow card) 87'; Petrov (yellow card) 90+2'	Report	Myakushko (yellow card) 27'; Holodyuk (yellow card) 43'	Stadium: Zirka Stadium; Attendance: 1,788; Referee: Denys Shurman

21 October 2017 13	Vorskla Poltava	0 – 1	Karpaty Lviv	Poltava
19:30 EEST (UTC+3)	Sharpar (yellow card) 78'; Sklyar (yellow card) 81'	Report	Myakushko 82'	Stadium: Butovskyi Vorskla Stadium; Attendance: 2,010; Referee: Mykola Kryvonosov

29 October 2017 14	Karpaty Lviv	1 – 1	Dynamo Kyiv	Lviv
19:30 EET (UTC+2)	Myakushko 54'	Report	Vida 12'; Korzun (yellow card) 53'	Stadium: Ukraina Stadium; Attendance: 4,125; Referee: Kostyantyn Trukhanov

5 November 2017 15	Stal Kamianske	0 – 0	Karpaty Lviv	Kyiv
17:00 EET (UTC+2)	Mysyk (yellow card) 55'; Tymchyk (yellow card) 69'; E. Malakyan (yellow card) 90+1'	Report	Fedetskyi (yellow card) 30'; Carrascal (yellow card) 57'; Khudobyak (yellow card) 64'	Stadium: Obolon Arena; Attendance: 500; Referee: Volodymyr Novokhatniy

18 November 2017 16	Karpaty Lviv	0 – 1	FC Mariupol	Lviv
17:00 EET (UTC+2)	Carrascal (yellow card) 39'; Fedetskyi (yellow card) 58'; Holodyuk (yellow card) 71'; Tissone (yellow card) 81'; Stasyshyn (yellow card) 83'	Report	Bolbat 20'	Stadium: Ukraina Stadium; Attendance: 0 Referee: Anatoliy Abdula

26 November 2017 17	FC Oleksandriya	3 – 0	Karpaty Lviv	Oleksandria
17:00 EET (UTC+2)	Polyarus 60', (yellow card) 62'; Starenkyi 66'; Dovhyi (yellow card) 76'; Ponomar 78'	Report	Tissone (yellow card) 29'; Khudobyak (yellow card) 75'	Stadium: Nika Stadium; Attendance: 1,007; Referee: Serhiy Boyko

3 December 2017; 21 February 2018^{[a]} 18	Karpaty Lviv	2 – 1	Olimpik Donetsk	Lviv
14:00 EET (UTC+2)	Tissone (yellow card) 7'; Myakushko 43'; Carrascal 56'	Report	Kravchenko 45+3'; Tsymbalyuk (yellow card) 63'; Kisil (yellow card) 69'; Ochigava (yellow card) 76' (yellow-red card) 80'; Bilenkyi (yellow card) 83'	Stadium: Ukraina Stadium; Attendance: 1,935; Referee: Kateryna Monzul'

9 December 2017 19	Veres Rivne	2 – 2	Karpaty Lviv	Lviv
14:00 EET (UTC+2)	Morozenko (yellow card) 8'; Kobin 14', (yellow card) 14'; Serhiychuk 28'; Siminin (yellow card) 56'	Report	Di Franco (yellow card) 26'; Akulinin (yellow card) 44', (goal) 87'; Carrascal (yellow card) 60'; Holodyuk (yellow card) 61'; Chachua (yellow card) 70'; Shved 72'	Stadium: Arena Lviv; Attendance: 1,547; Referee: Viktor Kopiievskyi

18 February 2018 20	Karpaty Lviv	0 – 2	Zorya Luhansk	Lviv
14:00 EET (UTC+2)	Lobay (yellow card) 43'; Nesterov (yellow card) 45'; Fedetskyi (yellow card) 67'	Report	Cheberko (yellow card) 54'; Tymchyk 55'; Iury (yellow card) 57', (goal) 72'; Faupala (yellow card) 63'; Checher (yellow card) 80'; Kabayev (yellow card) 89'	Stadium: Ukraina Stadium; Attendance: 1,853; Referee: Kostyantyn Trukhanov

24 February 2018 21	Chornomorets Odesa	0 – 0	Karpaty Lviv	Odesa
14:00 EET (UTC+2)	Tatarkov (yellow card) 4'; Kovalets (red card) 29'; Wagué (yellow card) 35'; Novak (yellow card) 90+1'	Report	Di Franco (yellow card) 20'; Verbnyi (yellow card) 29'; Sandokhadze (yellow card) 36'; Carrascal (yellow card) 64'; Klyots (yellow card) 69'	Stadium: Chornomorets Stadium; Attendance: 4,124; Referee: Volodymyr Milanych

4 March 2018 22	Karpaty Lviv	0 – 3	Shakhtar Donetsk	Lviv
19:30 EET (UTC+2)	Hutsulyak (yellow card) 29'; Fedetskyi (yellow card) 42'; Shved (yellow card) 90+2'	Report	Bernard 55'; Alan Patrick 70'; Ismaily 82'	Stadium: Ukraina Stadium; Attendance: 2,622; Referee: Kostyantyn Trukhanov

- ^{a} Match suspended after 1st half due to adverse weather conditions. 2nd half played on February 21

==== Relegation round ====
11 March 2018 23	Karpaty Lviv	0 – 3	Olimpik Donetsk	Lviv
14:00 EET (UTC+2)	Akulinin (yellow card) 45+1' (yellow-red card) 63'; Klyots (yellow card) 50'; Verbnyi (yellow card) 55'; Fedetskyi (yellow card) 64'; Hutsulyak (yellow card) 87'	Report	Bilenkyi 45' (pen.); Tsymbalyuk (yellow card) 64'; H.Pasich (yellow card) 66', (goal) 84'; Emmerson (yellow card) 77'; Schedryi 90+2'	Stadium: Ukraina Stadium; Attendance: 3,423; Referee: Mykola Balakin

18 March 2018 24	FC Oleksandriya	1 – 1	Karpaty Lviv	Oleksandria
14:00 EET (UTC+2)	Ponomar 70'; Hitchenko (yellow card) 90+4'	Report	Nesterov (yellow card) 39'; Erbes (yellow card) 42'; Lobay (yellow card) 66'; Shved 77'	Stadium: Nika Stadium; Attendance: 330; Referee: Volodymyr Novokhatniy

31 March 2018 25	Karpaty Lviv	3 – 1	Chornomorets Odesa	Lviv
14:00 EEST (UTC+3)	Carrascal 20'; Fedetskyi (yellow card) 45+3'; Shevchenko (yellow card) 45+3'; Shved 51', (yellow card) 69'; Sánchez 84'	Report	Tretyakov 45+5' (pen.); Smirnov (yellow card) 59'; Chorniy (yellow card) 65' (yellow-red card) 72'	Stadium: Ukraina Stadium; Attendance: 1,241; Referee: Kateryna Monzul'

9 April 2018 26	Karpaty Lviv	2 – 1	Zirka Kropyvnytskyi	Lviv
14:00 EEST (UTC+3)	Hutsulyak 23'; Erbes (yellow card) 37'; Lobay (yellow card) 45+2' (yellow-red card) 54'; Myakushko 65'; Holodyuk (yellow card) 88'	Report	Hovhannisyan (yellow card) 29' (yellow-red card) 58'; Tsyupa (yellow card) 45+1' (yellow-red card) 74'; Guedj (yellow card) 45+2'; Bilonoh 50'; Drachenko (yellow card) 76'	Stadium: Ukraina Stadium; Attendance: 2,715; Referee: Ihor Paskhal

15 April 2018 27	Stal Kamianske	0 – 1	Karpaty Lviv	Kyiv
19:30 EEST (UTC+3)	Hrachov (yellow card) 29' (yellow-red card) 75'; Ebert (yellow card) 44'; Mysyk (yellow card) 51'; Kopytov (yellow card) 53'	Report	Carrascal 34'; Di Franco (yellow card) 66'; Shevchenko (yellow card) 90'	Stadium: Obolon Arena; Attendance: 450; Referee: Mykola Kryvonosov

22 April 2018 28	Olimpik Donetsk	0 – 2	Karpaty Lviv	Kyiv
14:00 EEST (UTC+3)	Y.Pasich (yellow card) 27'; Vakulenko (yellow card) 79'; Tsymbalyuk (yellow card) 90+3'	Report	Carrascal (yellow card) 21', (goal) 58'; Shved 22'; Fedetskyi (yellow card) 28'; Nesterov (yellow card) 56'	Stadium: Lobanovskyi Dynamo Stadium; Attendance: 700; Referee: Denys Shurman

28 April 2018 29	Karpaty Lviv	1 – 2	FC Oleksandriya	Lviv
14:00 EEST (UTC+3)	Nesterov 4'; Lobay (yellow card) 40'; Hutsulyak (yellow card) 81'; Carrascal (yellow card) 89'	Report	Banada 35', (yellow card) 59'; Sitalo 52'; Dovhyi (yellow card) 58'	Stadium: Ukraina Stadium; Attendance: 6,725; Referee: Yaroslav Kozyk

5 May 2018 30	Chornomorets Odesa	1 – 1	Karpaty Lviv	Odesa
17:00 EEST (UTC+3)	Smirnov (yellow card) 45+1', (goal) 75'; Orikhovskyi (yellow card) 65'; Hladkyy (yellow card) 71'; Bobko (yellow card) 85'	Report	Shved 14', (yellow card) 79'; Erbes (yellow card) 26'; Nesterov (yellow card) 71'; Fedetskyi (yellow card) 71'	Stadium: Chornomorets Stadium; Attendance: 3,658; Referee: Ivan Bondar

12 May 2018 31	Zirka Kropyvnytskyi	1 – 1	Karpaty Lviv	Kropyvnytskyi
14:00 EEST (UTC+3)	Chychykov (yellow card) 15'; Gafaiti (yellow card) 31'; Petrov 38'; Drachenko (yellow card) 45+2'; Guedj (yellow card) 48'	Report	Verbnyi (yellow card) 24'; Lobay (yellow card) 42' (yellow-red card) 87'; Carrascal 45+2' (pen.), (yellow card) 85'; Erbes (yellow card) 50'; Fedetskyi (yellow card) 73'; Sánchez (yellow card) 90+1'	Stadium: Zirka Stadium; Attendance: 3,417; Referee: Yevhen Aranovskyi

19 May 2018 32	Karpaty Lviv	3 – 0	Stal Kamianske	Lviv
17:00 EEST (UTC+3)	Lebedenko 37'; Hutsulyak (yellow card) 44'; Di Franco (yellow card) 52'; Myakushko 61'; Shved 78'; Klyots (yellow card) 90+1'	Report	Oschypko (yellow card) 4'; Johnathan (yellow card) 84' (yellow-red card) 89'	Stadium: Ukraina Stadium; Attendance: 2,121; Referee: Volodymyr Novokhatniy

=== Ukrainian Cup ===
20 September 2017 Round of 20 (1/16)	Prykarpattia Ivano-Frankivsk	2 – 1	Karpaty Lviv	Ivano-Frankivsk
18:00 EEST (UTC+03:00)	Boryshkevych 41'; Derbakh 65'; Vepryk (yellow card) 76'; Dytko (yellow card) 90+27'	Report	Lobay (yellow card) 76'; Hutsulyak (yellow card) 76'; Memeshev 90+38'	Stadium: MCS Rukh; Attendance: 10,000; Referee: Oleksandr Solovyan

== Statistics ==
=== Appearances and goals ===
No.	Pos	Nat	Player	Total		Premier League		Cup	
No.	Pos	Nat	Player	Apps	Goals	Apps	Goals	Apps	Goals
Goalkeepers
1	GK	(Ukraine) UKR	Roman Pidkivka	16	0	16	0	0	0
23	GK	(Ukraine) UKR	Roman Mysak	7	0	6	0	1	0
99	GK	(Ukraine) UKR	Oleksiy Shevchenko	10	0	10	0	0	0
Defenders
4	DF	(Georgia (country)) GEO	Nika Sandokhadze	4	0	4	0	0	0
5	DF	(Ukraine) UKR	Andriy Nesterov	20	1	18+1	1	1	0
24	DF	(Ukraine) UKR	Volodymyr Senytsya	2	0	2	0	0	0
44	DF	(Ukraine) UKR	Artem Fedetskyi	25	0	25	0	0	0
54	DF	(Ukraine) UKR	Orest Lebedenko	11	1	7+3	1	1	0
70	DF	(Ukraine) UKR	Ivan Lobay	22	0	20+1	0	1	0
82	DF	(Ukraine) UKR	Nazar Stasyshyn	2	0	0+2	0	0	0
94	DF	(Ukraine) UKR	Denys Miroshnichenko	31	0	26+4	0	1	0
Midfielders
8	MF	(Ukraine) UKR	Nazar Verbnyi	14	0	12+2	0	0	0
10	MF	(Colombia) COL	Jorge Carrascal	22	6	18+4	6	0	0
11	MF	(Ukraine) UKR	Ambrosiy Chachua	15	1	11+4	1	0	0
17	MF	(Ukraine) UKR	Oleh Holodyuk	20	1	14+6	1	0	0
21	MF	(Argentina) ARG	Cristian Erbes	8	0	8	0	0	0
22	MF	(Ukraine) UKR	Andriy Busko	1	0	0+1	0	0	0
33	MF	(Ukraine) UKR	Serhiy Myakushko	25	5	23+1	5	1	0
48	MF	(Ukraine) UKR	Dmytro Klyots	14	0	5+8	0	1	0
81	MF	(Ukraine) UKR	Andriy Remenyuk	7	0	2+5	0	0	0
Forwards
7	FW	(Colombia) COL	Yhonatan Bedoya	1	0	0+1	0	0	0
9	FW	(Ukraine) UKR	Oleksiy Hutsulyak	26	1	23+2	1	0+1	0
18	FW	(Bolivia) BOL	Rodrigo Vargas	3	0	0+3	0	0	0
19	FW	(Colombia) COL	Maurício Cortés	3	0	0+3	0	0	0
20	FW	(Argentina) ARG	Francisco Di Franco	27	0	22+5	0	0	0
32	FW	(Argentina) ARG	Catriel Sánchez	8	1	0+8	1	0	0
35	FW	(Ukraine) UKR	Maryan Shved	18	6	14+4	6	0	0
79	FW	(Ukraine) UKR	Leonid Akulinin	17	1	7+9	1	0+1	0
Players transferred out during the season
3	DF	(Ukraine) UKR	Oleksandr Osman	1	0	1	0	0	0
4	DF	(Argentina) ARG	Federico Pereyra	4	0	4	0	0	0
7	MF	(Ukraine) UKR	Pavlo Ksyonz	6	0	5	0	1	0
14	MF	(Spain) ESP	Mario Arqués	5	0	2+3	0	0	0
16	MF	(Ukraine) UKR	Ihor Khudobyak	16	1	12+3	1	1	0
19	FW	(Ukraine) UKR	Redvan Memeshev	3	1	0+2	0	0+1	1
21	FW	(Ukraine) UKR	Oleksandr Hladkyy	10	1	8+1	1	1	0
28	MF	(Argentina) ARG	Fernando Tissone	13	0	12	0	1	0
45	FW	(Uruguay) URU	Sebastián Ribas	4	1	3+1	1	0	0
47	MF	(Ukraine) UKR	Maksym Hrysyo	2	0	0+2	0	0	0
87	DF	(Argentina) ARG	Guido Corteggiano	9	0	7+2	0	0	0
93	MF	(Ukraine) UKR	Roman Debelko	6	1	3+3	1	0	0
95	MF	(Ukraine) UKR	Yuriy Tkachuk	2	0	2	0	0	0

Source: Competitions

Last updated: 19 May 2018

=== Goalscorers ===
Rank	No.	Pos	Nat	Name	Premier League	Cup	Total
1	10	MF	(Colombia)	Jorge Carrascal	6	0	6
1	35	FW	(Ukraine)	Maryan Shved	6	0	6
3	33	MF	(Ukraine)	Serhiy Myakushko	5	0	5
4	11	MF	(Ukraine)	Ambrosiy Chachua	1	0	1
4	45	FW	(Uruguay)	Sebastián Ribas	1	0	1
4	16	MF	(Ukraine)	Ihor Khudobyak	1	0	1
4	17	MF	(Ukraine)	Oleh Holodyuk	1	0	1
4	93	MF	(Ukraine)	Roman Debelko	1	0	1
4	19	FW	(Ukraine)	Redvan Memeshev	0	1	1
4	21	FW	(Ukraine)	Oleksandr Hladkyy	1	0	1
4	79	FW	(Ukraine)	Leonid Akulinin	1	0	1
4	32	FW	(Argentina)	Catriel Sánchez	1	0	1
4	9	FW	(Ukraine)	Oleksiy Hutsulyak	1	0	1
4	5	DF	(Ukraine)	Andriy Nesterov	1	0	1
4	54	DF	(Ukraine)	Orest Lebedenko	1	0	1
				Total	28	1	29

Last updated: 19 May 2018

=== Clean sheets ===
Rank	No.	Pos	Nat	Name	Premier League	Cup	Total
1	1	GK	(Ukraine)	Roman Pidkivka	6	0	6
2	99	GK	(Ukraine)	Oleksiy Shevchenko	3	0	3
3	23	GK	(Ukraine)	Roman Mysak	1	0	1
				Total	10	0	10

Last updated: 19 May 2018

=== Disciplinary record ===
No.	Pos	Nat	Player	Premier League			Cup			Total		
No.	Pos	Nat	Player	Yellow card	(yellow card) (yellow-red card)	Red card	Yellow card	(yellow card) (yellow-red card)	Red card	Yellow card	(yellow card) (yellow-red card)	Red card
1	GK	(Ukraine)	Roman Pidkivka	3	0	0	0	0	0	3	0	0
4	DF	(Argentina)	Federico Pereyra	1	0	0	0	0	0	1	0	0
4	DF	(Georgia (country))	Nika Sandokhadze	1	0	0	0	0	0	1	0	0
5	DF	(Ukraine)	Andriy Nesterov	7	0	0	0	0	0	7	0	0
7	MF	(Ukraine)	Pavlo Ksyonz	1	0	0	0	0	0	1	0	0
8	MF	(Ukraine)	Nazar Verbnyi	3	0	0	0	0	0	3	0	0
9	FW	(Ukraine)	Oleksiy Hutsulyak	4	0	0	1	0	0	5	0	0
10	MF	(Colombia)	Jorge Carrascal	8	0	0	0	0	0	8	0	0
11	MF	(Ukraine)	Ambrosiy Chachua	3	0	0	0	0	0	3	0	0
14	MF	(Spain)	Mario Arqués	1	0	0	0	0	0	1	0	0
16	MF	(Ukraine)	Ihor Khudobyak	3	0	0	0	0	0	3	0	0
17	MF	(Ukraine)	Oleh Holodyuk	6	1	0	0	0	0	6	1	0
19	FW	(Ukraine)	Redvan Memeshev	1	0	0	0	0	0	1	0	0
20	FW	(Argentina)	Francisco Di Franco	5	0	0	0	0	0	5	0	0
21	MF	(Argentina)	Cristian Erbes	4	0	0	0	0	0	4	0	0
28	MF	(Argentina)	Fernando Tissone	3	0	0	0	0	0	3	0	0
32	FW	(Argentina)	Catriel Sánchez	1	0	0	0	0	0	1	0	0
33	MF	(Ukraine)	Serhiy Myakushko	2	0	0	0	0	0	2	0	0
35	FW	(Ukraine)	Maryan Shved	3	0	0	0	0	0	3	0	0
44	DF	(Ukraine)	Artem Fedetskyi	14	0	0	0	0	0	14	0	0
45	FW	(Uruguay)	Sebastián Ribas	1	0	0	0	0	0	1	0	0
48	MF	(Ukraine)	Dmytro Klyots	3	0	0	0	0	0	3	0	0
54	DF	(Ukraine)	Orest Lebedenko	3	0	0	0	0	0	3	0	0
70	DF	(Ukraine)	Ivan Lobay	5	2	0	1	0	0	6	2	0
79	FW	(Ukraine)	Leonid Akulinin	1	1	0	0	0	0	1	1	0
82	DF	(Ukraine)	Nazar Stasyshyn	1	0	0	1	0	0	1	0	0
87	DF	(Argentina)	Guido Corteggiano	2	0	0	0	0	0	2	0	0
94	DF	(Ukraine)	Denys Miroshnichenko	3	0	0	0	0	0	3	0	0
99	GK	(Ukraine)	Oleksiy Shevchenko	2	0	0	0	0	0	2	0	0
			Total	91	4	0	2	0	0	93	4	0

Last updated: 19 May 2018

== Hudyma vs Karpaty ==
Back in 2014 a former player of Karpaty Volodymyr Hudyma filed a case against FC Karpaty Lviv to the FFU Chamber of Disputes for failing the club to pay his salary and won it. Since 2017 Karpaty filed three counter cases against Hudyma and FFU (accusing the later of siding with the player) through regular local court. Karpaty continuously ignore the FIFA and the UEFA norms where it is prohibited of handling the cases in sport nature in courts of general jurisdiction. In 2017 FFU in ultimatum form forced Karpaty to withdraw one of its cases or the club would have been stripped of professional status. At first Karpaty withdrew its appeal, but later filed it again. On 21 April 2017 the FFU Appeals Committee stated that the club has to pay its player the debt until 15 May 2017. On 24 November 2017 Karpaty lost its case against Hudyma in the Court of Arbitration for Sport. On 21 December 2017 the FFU Control and Disciplinary Committee stripped Karpaty of three tournament points, but the initiative was never implemented by the Ukrainian Premier League.

Volodymyr Hudyma is not the only victim whom Karpaty never paid salary in full. Among other players is the Karpaty's caps leader Ihor Khudobyak whom the club did not even allowed to leave.

On 6 March 2018 it was announced that with mediation from the president of FC Rukh Vynnyky Hryhoriy Kozlovskyi, Volodymyr Hudyma withdrew all his grievances against Karpaty Lviv and personally asked the Football Federation of Ukraine not to impose sanctions against the Lviv's club.
