= 2017–18 NK Veres Rivne season =

Veres Rivne
2017-18 season
- President: Oleksiy Khakhlyov (until 23 March 2018); Borys Kopytko (since 23 March 2018)
- Manager: Yuriy Virt (until 29 December 2017); Yury Svirkov (from 30 December 2017 to 25 April 2018); Andriy Demchenko (since 26 April 2018)
- Stadium: Arena Lviv, Lviv
- Ukrainian Premier League: 6th
- Ukrainian Cup: Quarterfinal
- Top goalscorer: League: Mykhaylo Serhiychuk (6); All: Mykhaylo Serhiychuk (6)
Home colours	Away colours

The 2017–18 season was Veres Rivne's 4th season in the top Ukrainian football league. Veres competed in Premier League and Ukrainian Cup. Despite finishing in third place in 2016–17 Ukrainian First League club was promoted after the controversial decision of the Ukrainian Premier League which denied Desna Chernihiv who finished in second place a licence to participate in the league, indicating that the club was not able to guarantee for an adequate financing of their infrastructure.

== Players ==
=== Squad information ===
As of 31 May 2018

Squad no.	Name	Nationality	Position	Date of birth (age)
Goalkeepers
1	Dmytro Fastov ^{List B}	(Ukraine)	GK	25 July 1997 (aged 20)
23	Bohdan Sarnavskyi	(Ukraine)	GK	29 January 1995 (aged 23)
31	Oleksandr Bandura	(Ukraine)	GK	30 May 1986 (aged 32)
Defenders
3	Volodymyr Adamyuk	(Ukraine)	DF	17 July 1991 (aged 26)
4	Vladyslav Pryimak ^{List B}	(Ukraine)	DF	30 August 1996 (aged 21)
5	Volodymyr Skotarenko ^{List B}	(Ukraine)	DF	17 March 1997 (aged 21)
8	Serhiy Siminin	(Ukraine)	DF	9 October 1987 (aged 30)
13	Volodymyr Domnitsak	(Ukraine)	DF	24 December 1995 (aged 22)
16	Pavlo Lukyanchuk (on loan from Dynamo Kyiv) ^{List B}	(Ukraine)	DF	19 May 1996 (aged 22)
20	Pepi ^{List B}	(Brazil)	DF	14 April 1996 (aged 22)
33	Serhiy Borzenko (Captain)	(Ukraine)	DF	22 June 1986 (aged 31)
43	Artur Zapadnya	(Ukraine)	DF	4 June 1990 (aged 27)
53	Pavlo Myahkov	(Ukraine)	DF	30 December 1992 (aged 25)
	Volodymyr Zavaliak ^{List B}	(Ukraine)	DF	24 July 1996 (aged 21)
Midfielders
2	Mykyta Kamenyuka (on loan from Zorya Luhansk)	(Ukraine)	MF	3 June 1985 (aged 32)
6	Maksym Kalenchuk	(Ukraine)	MF	5 December 1989 (aged 28)
10	Yevhen Morozenko	(Ukraine)	MF	16 December 1991 (aged 26)
22	Rostyslav Voloshynovych	(Ukraine)	MF	23 May 1991 (aged 27)
27	Maksym Khimchyak ^{List B}	(Ukraine)	MF	13 February 2000 (aged 18)
29	Denys Kozhanov	(Ukraine)	MF	13 June 1987 (aged 30)
91	Roman Karasyuk	(Ukraine)	MF	27 March 1991 (aged 27)
	Oleh Horin ^{List B}	(Ukraine)	MF	2 February 2000 (aged 18)
	Yuriy Berdey ^{List B}	(Ukraine)	MF	3 May 1996 (aged 22)
Forwards
7	Ruslan Stepanyuk	(Ukraine)	FW	16 January 1992 (aged 26)
11	Stanislav Kulish	(Ukraine)	FW	8 February 1989 (aged 29)
18	Vitaliy Mykytyn ^{List B}	(Ukraine)	FW	4 November 1998 (aged 19)
95	Julio Cesar	(Brazil)	FW	18 April 1995 (aged 23)

== Transfers ==
=== In ===
Date	Pos.	Player	Age	Moving from	Type	Fee	Source
Summer
25 June 2017	DF	(Ukraine) Serhiy Siminin	29	(Ukraine) FC Oleksandriya	Transfer	Free	
1 July 2017	GK	(Ukraine) Oleksandr Bandura	31	(Ukraine) Stal Kamianske	Transfer	Free	
1 July 2017	MF	(Ukraine) Roman Karasyuk	26	(Ukraine) Stal Kamianske	Transfer	Free	
3 July 2017	DF	(Ukraine) Mykola Ischenko	34	(Ukraine) Stal Kamianske	Transfer	Free	
3 July 2017	MF	(Ukraine) Hennadiy Pasich	23	(Ukraine) Naftovyk-Ukrnafta	Transfer	Free	
3 July 2017	MF	(Ukraine) Yevhen Pasich	23	(Ukraine) Naftovyk-Ukrnafta	Transfer	Free	
11 July 2017	DF	(Ukraine) Volodymyr Adamyuk	25	(Ukraine) Dnipro	Transfer	Free	
11 July 2017	FW	(Ukraine) Mykhaylo Serhiychuk	25	(Ukraine) Olimpik Donetsk	Transfer	Free	
28 July 2017	DF	(Ukraine) Ihor Chenakal	20	(Ukraine) FC Lviv	Transfer	Undisclosed	
3 August 2017	DF	(Ukraine) Vasyl Kobin	32	(Ukraine) Shakhtar Donetsk	Transfer	Free	
3 August 2017	MF	(Ukraine) Valeriy Fedorchuk	28	(Ukraine) Dynamo Kyiv	Transfer	Free	
10 August 2017	MF	(Spain) Edgar Caparrós	20	Unattached	Transfer	Free	
19 September 2017	FW	(Ukraine) Vasyl Palahnyuk	26	Unattached	Transfer	Free	
13 July 2017	MF	(Ukraine) Serhiy Hryn	23	(Ukraine) Shakhtar Donetsk	Loan		
Winter
1 January 2018	DF	(Ukraine) Vladyslav Pryimak	21	(Ukraine) Prykarpattia Ivano-Frankivsk	Transfer	Free	
1 January 2018	MF	(Ukraine) Maksym Kalenchuk	28	(Ukraine) FC Oleksandriya	Transfer	Free	
11 January 2018	MF	(Ukraine) Denys Kozhanov	30	(Ukraine) FC Mariupol	Transfer	Free	
20 January 2018	FW	(Ukraine) Stanislav Kulish	28	(Ukraine) FC Oleksandriya	Transfer	Free	
9 February 2018	GK	(Ukraine) Bohdan Sarnavskyi	23	(Ukraine) Vorskla Poltava	Transfer	Free	
9 February 2018	DF	(Ukraine) Pavlo Myahkov	25	(Ukraine) FC Minsk	Transfer	Free	
12 January 2018	MF	(Ukraine) Mykyta Kamenyuka	32	(Ukraine) Zorya Luhansk	Loan		
9 February 2018	DF	(Ukraine) Pavlo Lukyanchuk	21	(Ukraine) Dynamo Kyiv	Loan		

=== Out ===
Date	Pos.	Player	Age	Moving to	Type	Fee	Source
Summer
31 May 2017	DF	(Ukraine) Yarema Kavatsiv	31	Unattached	Transfer	Free	
28 June 2017	DF	(Ukraine) Vasyl Bilyi	27	(Ukraine) Rukh Vynnyky	Transfer	Free	
June 2017	DF	(Ukraine) Serhiy Herasymets	28	(Ukraine) MFC Mykolaiv	Transfer	Free	
June 2017	FW	(Ukraine) Ihor Sikorskyi	28	(Ukraine) MFC Mykolaiv	Transfer	Free	
4 July 2017	FW	(Ukraine) Dmytro Kozban	27	(Poland) Motor Lublin	Transfer	Free	
5 July 2017	MF	(Ukraine) Vadym Strashkevych	23	(Ukraine) FC Poltava	Transfer	Free	
8 July 2017	MF	(Ukraine) Taras Koblyuk	23	(Ukraine) FC Lviv	Transfer	Undisclosed	
13 July 2017	DF	(Ukraine) Vyacheslav Lukhtanov	22	(Ukraine) Olimpik Donetsk	Transfer	Free	
13 July 2017	DF	(Ukraine) Oleksiy Zozulya	25	(Ukraine) Kolos Kovalivka	Transfer	Free	
14 July 2017	GK	(Ukraine) Roman Chopko	24	(Ukraine) FC Ternopil	Transfer	Free	
17 August 2017	GK	(Ukraine) Oleksandr Ilyuschenkov	27	(Ukraine) Rukh Vynnyky	Transfer	Free	
25 August 2017	MF	(Ghana) Barnor Bright	23	(Ukraine) MFC Mykolaiv	Transfer	Free	
1 September 2017	MF	(Ukraine) Valeriy Lebed	28	(Ukraine) PFC Sumy	Transfer	Free	
8 September 2017	MF	(Ukraine) Volodymyr Dmytrenko	22	(Ukraine) Arsenal Kyiv	Transfer	Free	
22 September 2017	MF	(Ukraine) Borys Orlovskyi	24	(Ukraine) FC Lviv	Transfer	Free	
20 October 2017	MF	(Ukraine) Valeriy Fedorchuk	29	Unattached	Transfer	Free	
1 June 2017	DF	(Ukraine) Serhiy Petko	23	(Ukraine) Chornomorets Odesa	Loan return		
Winter
1 January 2018	MF	(Spain) Edgar Caparrós	20	Unattached	Transfer	Free	
1 January 2018	MF	(Ukraine) Valeriy Kucherov	24	Unattached	Transfer	Free	
1 January 2018	FW	(Ukraine) Vasyl Palahnyuk	26	Unattached	Transfer	Free	
29 January 2018	GK	(Ukraine) Bohdan Kohut	30	(Ukraine) Volyn Lutsk	Transfer	Free	
1 February 2018	MF	(Ukraine) Hennadiy Pasich	24	(Ukraine) Olimpik Donetsk	Transfer	Free	
1 February 2018	MF	(Ukraine) Yevhen Pasich	24	(Ukraine) Olimpik Donetsk	Transfer	Free	
7 February 2018	DF	(Ukraine) Vasyl Kobin	32	(Kazakhstan) Tobol	Transfer	Free	
11 February 2018	DF	(Ukraine) Mykola Ischenko	34	(Ukraine) Chornomorets Odesa	Transfer	Free	
13 February 2018	MF	(Ukraine) Anton Kotlyar	24	(Ukraine) Helios Kharkiv	Transfer	Free	
5 March 2018	FW	(Ukraine) Mykhaylo Serhiychuk	26	(Ukraine) Vorskla Poltava	Transfer	Free	
1 January 2018	DF	(Ukraine) Serhiy Hryn	23	(Ukraine) Shakhtar Donetsk	Loan return		

== Pre-season and friendlies ==
27 June 2017 Friendly	Veres Rivne (Ukraine)	4–1	(Ukraine) MFC Mykolaiv	Slavske
17:00 EEST (UTC+03:00)	Kotlyar 9'; Voloshynovych 22'; 77', 84'	Report	Goal

30 June 2017 Friendly	Rukh Vynnyky (Ukraine)	0–1	(Ukraine) Veres Rivne	Vynnyky
17:00 EEST (UTC+03:00)		Report	Hennadiy Pasich 45'	Stadium: Bohdan Markevych Stadium

2 July 2017 Friendly	Veres Rivne (Ukraine)	5–1	(Ukraine) Zirka Kropyvnytskyi	Uzhhorod
17:00 EEST (UTC+03:00)	Stepanyuk 54', 91'; Hennadiy Pasich 60'; Kotlyar 80'; Yevhen Pasich 84'	Report	48'	Stadium: HC "Kamelot"

7 July 2017 Friendly	Veres Rivne (Ukraine)	6–0	(Ukraine) Karpaty Lviv U-21	Vynnyky
17:00 EEST (UTC+03:00)	Stepanyuk 7'; Ischenko 16'; Zapadnya 18'; 23'; Hennadiy Pasich 49'; Morozenko 83'	Report

10 July 2017 Friendly	Veres Rivne (Ukraine)	3–0	(Ukraine) Volyn Lutsk	Vynnyky
17:00 EEST (UTC+03:00)	Stepanyuk 58'; Serhiychuk 72' (pen.), 76'	Report

31 August 2017 Friendly	Mezőkövesd (Hungary)	0–2	(Ukraine) Veres Rivne	Hungary
EEST (UTC+03:00)		Report	Adamyuk 44'; Karasyuk 87'

2 September 2017 Friendly	Debrecen (Hungary)	5–2	(Ukraine) Veres Rivne	Hungary
11:30 EEST (UTC+03:00)	Takács 61', 65'; Bényei 74'; Tisza 78' (pen.), 90' (pen.)	Report	Morozenko 48'; Stepanyuk 84'

8 October 2017 Friendly	Veres Rivne (Ukraine)	2–0	(Ukraine) Karpaty Lviv	Vynnyky
14:00 EEST (UTC+03:00)	Morozenko 81', 90' (pen.)	Report		Stadium: Bohdan Markevych Stadium

24 January 2018 Friendly	Veres Rivne (Ukraine)	1–3	(Romania) Gaz Metan Mediaș	Side, Turkey
14:00 EET (UTC+02:00)	Serhiychuk 66' (pen.)	Report	21' (pen.); 87'; 87'

30 January 2018 Friendly	Veres Rivne (Ukraine)	1–2	(Bulgaria) Beroe Stara Zagora	Turkey
EET (UTC+02:00)	Kozhanov 17'	Report	Pedro Eugénio 69', 73'

30 January 2018 Friendly	Veres Rivne (Ukraine)	0–0	(Slovakia) Železiarne Podbrezová	Turkey
EET (UTC+02:00)		Report

4 February 2018 Friendly	Veres Rivne (Ukraine)	Cancelled	(Georgia (country)) FC Samtredia	Turkey
EET (UTC+02:00)		Report

4 February 2018 Friendly	Veres Rivne (Ukraine)	0–0	(Kazakhstan) Zhetysu	Turkey
16:00 EET (UTC+02:00)		Report

6 February 2018 Friendly	Veres Rivne (Ukraine)	Cancelled	(Czech Republic) Vysočina Jihlava	Turkey
EET (UTC+02:00)		Report

6 February 2018 Friendly	Veres Rivne (Ukraine)	1–0	(Slovakia) Slovan Bratislava	Belek, Turkey
15:30 EET (UTC+02:00)	Serhiychuk 90'	Report

10 February 2018 Friendly	Veres Rivne (Ukraine)	Cancelled	(Belarus) Dinamo Minsk	Turkey
EET (UTC+02:00)		Report

10 February 2018 Friendly	Veres Rivne (Ukraine)	0–0	(Ukraine) Desna Chernihiv	Side, Turkey
16:00 EET (UTC+02:00)		Report

== Competitions ==
=== Overall ===
Competition	First match	Last match	Starting round	Final position	Record							
Competition	First match	Last match	Starting round	Final position	Pld	W	D	L	GF	GA	GD	Win %
Premier League	16 July 2017	20 May 2018	Matchday 1	6th	32	7	14	11	28	30	−2	21.88
Cup	20 September 2017	29 November 2017	Round 3 (1/16)	Quarterfinal	3	2	0	1	3	5	−2	66.67
Total					35	9	14	12	31	35	−4	25.71

Last updated: 20 May 2018
Source: Competitions

=== Premier League ===
==== League table ====
Pos	Team	Pld	W	D	L	GF	GA	GD	Pts	Qualification or relegation
2	Dynamo Kyiv	32	22	7	3	64	25	+39	73	Qualification for the Champions League third qualifying round
3	Vorskla Poltava	32	14	7	11	37	35	+2	49	Qualification for the Europa League group stage (Note: Since the winners of the 2017–18 Ukrainian Cup, Shakhtar Donetsk, qualified for European competition based on league position, the spot awarded to the cup winners (Europa League group stage) was passed to the third-placed team, the spot awarded to the third-placed team (Europa League third qualifying round) was passed to the fourth-placed team, and the spot awarded to the fourth-placed team (Europa League second qualifying round) was passed to the fifth-placed team.)
4	Zorya Luhansk	32	11	10	11	44	44	0	43	Qualification for the Europa League third qualifying round
5	FC Mariupol	32	10	9	13	38	41	−3	39	Qualification for the Europa League second qualifying round
6	Veres Rivne (D)	32	7	14	11	28	30	−2	35	Club suspended after the season

Source: Ukrainian Premier League (in Ukrainian), UEFA, Soccerway
Rules for classification: 1) Points; 2) Goal difference; 3) Goals scored; 4) Head-to-head points; 5) Head-to-head goal difference; 6) Head-to-head goals scored; 7) Draw.
(D) Disqualified
Notes:

Team 1	Agg.	Team 2	1st leg	2nd leg
Zirka Kropyvnytskyi	1–5	Desna Chernihiv	1–1	0–4
Chornomorets Odesa	1–3	FC Poltava	1–0	0–3 (a.e.t.)

==== Results summary ====
Overall								Home						Away					
Pld	W	D	L	GF	GA	GD	Pts	W	D	L	GF	GA	GD	W	D	L	GF	GA	GD
32	7	14	11	28	30	−2	35	3	8	5	15	18	−3	4	6	6	13	12	+1

Last updated: 20 May 2018.
Source: Competitive matches

==== Results by round ====
Round	1	2	3	4	5	6	7	8	9	10	11	12	13	14	15	16	17	18	19	20	21	22	23	24	25	26	27	28	29	30	31	32
Ground	A	H	A	A	H	A	H	A	H	A	H	H	A	H	H	A	H	A	H	A	H	A	A	H	A	H	A	H	A	H	A	H
Result	D	D	D	W	L	W	L	W	W	D	D	D	D	D	D	D	W	L	D	L	W	W	L	L	D	L	L	L	L	D	D	D
Position	7	8	7	5	6	5	6	5	5	5	5	6	5	5	4	5	3	4	5	5	5	5	6	6	5	5	6	6	6	6	6	6

Updated to match(es) played on 20 May 2018. Source: Competitive matches
A = Away; H = Home; W = Win; D = Draw; L = Loss

==== Matches ====
16 July 2017 1	FC Mariupol	0–0	Veres Rivne	Mariupol
17:00 EEST (UTC+03:00)	Kisil (yellow card) 38'; Myshnyov (yellow card) 73'; Rudyka (yellow card) 82'; Yavorskyi (yellow card) 90+1'; Vakulenko (yellow card) 90+1'	Report	Bandura (yellow card) 87'; Hryn (yellow card) 90+3'	Stadium: Volodymyr Boiko Stadium; Attendance: 8,500; Referee: Vitaliy Romanov

22 July 2017 2	Veres Rivne	0–0	FC Oleksandriya	Lviv
17:00 EEST (UTC+03:00)	Yevhen Pasich (yellow card) 71'	Report	Chebotayev (yellow card) 60'	Stadium: Arena Lviv; Attendance: 1,715; Referee: Mykola Balakin

30 July 2017 3	Olimpik Donetsk	0–0	Veres Rivne	Kyiv
19:30 EEST (UTC+03:00)	Brikner (yellow card) 16'; Fedoriv (yellow card) 34'; Illoy-Ayyet (yellow card) 45+2'; Bohdanov (yellow card) 83'	Report	Siminin (yellow card) 20'	Stadium: Dynamo Stadium; Attendance: 753; Referee: Denys Shurman

6 August 2017 4	Zirka Kropyvnytskyi	1–3	Veres Rivne	Kropyvnytskyi
19:30 EEST (UTC+03:00)	Zahalskyi 30', (yellow card) 85'; Kacharaba (yellow card) 43' (yellow-red card) 81'; Pryadun (yellow card) 45'; Polehenko (yellow card) 67'; Chychykov (yellow card) 90'	Report	Ischenko (yellow card) 28'; Adamyuk (yellow card) 42'; Siminin 45+1'; Fedorchuk (yellow card) 58'; Voloshynovych 83'; Serhiychuk 90+2'	Stadium: Zirka Stadium; Attendance: 1,770; Referee: Ihor Paskhal

12 August 2017 5	Veres Rivne	0–1	Zorya Luhansk	Lviv
17:00 EEST (UTC+03:00)	Stepanyuk (yellow card) 31'	Report	Sukhotskyi (yellow card) 51'; Pryima (yellow card) 62'; Kharatin (yellow card) 68'; Kalitvintsev 76'; Iury (yellow card) 83'	Stadium: Arena Lviv; Attendance: 1,847; Referee: Mykola Kryvonosov

19 August 2017 6	Chornomorets Odesa	0–1	Veres Rivne	Odesa
19:30 EEST (UTC+03:00)	Antonov (yellow card) 28'; Vasin (yellow card) 87'	Report	Fedorchuk (yellow card) 71'; Kobin (yellow card) 74'; Karasyuk (yellow card) 86'; Adamyuk 90+2'	Stadium: Chornomorets Stadium; Attendance: 4,952; Referee: Viktor Kopiyevskyi

27 August 2017 7	Veres Rivne	1–2	Shakhtar Donetsk	Lviv
17:00 EEST (UTC+03:00)	Fedorchuk 2'; Stepanyuk (yellow card) 36'; Voloshynovych (yellow card) 68'	Report	Marlos 55', (yellow card) 66'; Rakitskiy (yellow card) 57'; Fred (yellow card) 80'; Dentinho 88'; Taison (yellow card) 90+5'	Stadium: Arena Lviv; Attendance: 7,027; Referee: Vitaliy Romanov

10 September 2017 8	Karpaty Lviv	1–6	Veres Rivne	Lviv
17:00 EEST (UTC+03:00)	Fedetskyi (yellow card) 33'; Pidkivka (yellow card) 45'; Lobay (yellow card) 49'; Carrascal (yellow card) 70', (goal) 87'; Corteggiano (yellow card) 75'; Miroshnichenko (yellow card) 75'	Report	Borzenko 34'; Serhiychuk 45' (pen.), 72'; Stepanyuk 53'; Kobin 76' (pen.); Hennadiy Pasich 83'	Stadium: Ukraina Stadium; Attendance: 8,640; Referee: Yaroslav Kozyk

16 September 2017 9	Veres Rivne	1–0	Vorskla Poltava	Lviv
17:00 EEST (UTC+03:00)	Yevhen Pasich 65'; Voloshynovych (yellow card) 67'; Bandura (yellow card) 90+4'	Report	Chyzhov (yellow card) 26'; Kolomoyets (yellow card) 50'; Perduta (yellow card) 77'	Stadium: Arena Lviv; Attendance: 1,138; Referee: Denys Shurman

23 September 2017 10	Dynamo Kyiv	0–0	Veres Rivne	Kyiv
19:30 EEST (UTC+03:00)	Sydorchuk (yellow card) 75'	Report	Serhiychuk (yellow card) 90'	Stadium: NSC Olimpiyskiy; Attendance: 0 Referee: Kostyantyn Trukhanov

1 October 2017 11	Veres Rivne	1–1	Stal Kamianske	Lviv
17:00 EEST (UTC+03:00)	Fedorchuk (yellow card) 56'; Karasyuk (yellow card) 87'; Adamyuk 88'	Report	Mysyk (yellow card) 31'; Kuzyk 42'; Hrachov (yellow card) 54'; Klymchuk (yellow card) 63'; Edgar Malakyan (yellow card) 75'	Stadium: Arena Lviv; Attendance: 780; Referee: Dmytro Kutakov

14 October 2017 12	Veres Rivne	1–1	FC Mariupol	Lviv
17:00 EEST (UTC+03:00)	Voloshynovych (yellow card) 19'; Borzenko 65'; Siminin (yellow card) 76'	Report	Tankovskyi (yellow card) 24'; Yavorskyi (red card) 68'; Tyschenko (yellow card) 73'; Totovytskyi 80'	Stadium: Arena Lviv; Attendance: 1,060; Referee: Serhiy Boyko

21 October 2017 13	FC Oleksandriya	1–1	Veres Rivne	Oleksandriya
17:00 EEST (UTC+03:00)	Sitalo (yellow card) 15'; Polyarus (yellow card) 31' (yellow-red card) 86'; Starenkyi (yellow card) 60', (goal) 77'; Zaporozhan (yellow card) 79'; Tsurikov (yellow card) 83'	Report	Morozenko (yellow card) 52', (goal) 63'; Serhiychuk (yellow card) 84'; Kobin (yellow card) 90+4'	Stadium: CSC Nika Stadium; Attendance: 1,100; Referee: Kateryna Monzul

29 October 2017 14	Veres Rivne	1–1	Olimpik Donetsk	Lviv
17:00 EET (UTC+02:00)	Serhiychuk 10' (pen.); Morozenko (yellow card) 28'; Siminin (yellow card) 51'; Adamyuk (yellow card) 65'; Borzenko (yellow card) 80'; Zapadnya (yellow card) 83'	Report	Bohdanov (yellow card) 16'; Moha 51'; Fedoriv (yellow card) 90+2'	Stadium: Arena Lviv; Attendance: 738; Referee: Vitaliy Romanov

4 November 2017 15	Veres Rivne	0–0	Zirka Kropyvnytskyi	Lviv
14:00 EET (UTC+02:00)	Siminin (yellow card) 80'; Adamyuk (yellow card) 90+3'	Report	Petrov (yellow card) 34'; Kacharaba (yellow card) 45+2'; Drachenko (yellow card) 85'	Stadium: Ukraina Stadium; Attendance: 710; Referee: Dmytro Bondarenko

18 November 2017 16	Zorya Luhansk	1–1	Veres Rivne	Zaporizhia
14:00 EET (UTC+02:00)	Hromov 28'; Iury (yellow card) 90+3'	Report	Serhiychuk (yellow card) 24'; Ischenko (yellow card) 36' (yellow-red card) 58'; Adamyuk 61'; Bandura (yellow card) 87'; Kobin (yellow card) 90+3'	Stadium: Slavutych-Arena; Attendance: 1,850; Referee: Mykola Kryvonosov

26 November 2017 17	Veres Rivne	3–1	Chornomorets Odesa	Lviv
14:00 EET (UTC+02:00)	Karasyuk 25'; Voloshynovych 45'; Serhiychuk 54'	Report	Wagué (yellow card) 19'; Orikhovskyi (yellow card) 29'; Tatarkov (yellow card) 35'; Khoblenko 68'	Stadium: Arena Lviv; Attendance: 1,080; Referee: Kostyantyn Trukhanov

2 December 2017 18	Shakhtar Donetsk	2–0	Veres Rivne	Kharkiv
17:00 EET (UTC+02:00)	Marlos 50' (pen.), (yellow card) 90'; Ferreyra (yellow card) 65', (goal) 75'; Bernard (yellow card) 69'; Fred (yellow card) 90+1'	Report	Ischenko (yellow card) 48'; Voloshynovych (yellow card) 64'; Borzenko (yellow card) 66'; Siminin (yellow card) 82'	Stadium: OSC Metalist; Attendance: 1,956; Referee: Denys Shurman

9 December 2017 19	Veres Rivne	2–2	Karpaty Lviv	Lviv
14:00 EET (UTC+02:00)	Morozenko (yellow card) 8'; Kobin 14', (yellow card) 14'; Serhiychuk 28'; Siminin (yellow card) 56'	Report	Di Franco (yellow card) 26'; Akulinin (yellow card) 44'; Carrascal (yellow card) 60'; Holodyuk (yellow card) 61'; Chachua (yellow card) 70'; Shved 72'	Stadium: Arena Lviv; Attendance: 1,547; Referee: Viktor Kopiyevskyi

17 February 2018 20	Vorskla Poltava	1–0	Veres Rivne	Poltava
17:00 EET (UTC+02:00)	Chesnakov (yellow card) 47'; Kulach 58', (yellow card) 59'; Sapay (yellow card) 80'	Report	Kalenchuk (yellow card) 30'; Kamenyuka (yellow card) 73'; Borzenko (yellow card) 76'; Serhiychuk (yellow card) 87'	Stadium: Vorskla Stadium; Attendance: 700; Referee: Mykola Balakin

25 February 2018 21	Veres Rivne	3–1	Dynamo Kyiv	Lviv
17:00 EET (UTC+02:00)	Kulish 13'; Siminin 23' (pen.), (yellow card) 65' (yellow-red card) 72'; Bandura (yellow card) 57'; Stepanyuk 82', (yellow card) 82'	Report	Rotan (red card) 22'; Tsyhankov 42'; Kádár (yellow card) 48'; Morozyuk (yellow card) 55'; Burda (yellow card) 57' (yellow-red card) 67'	Stadium: Arena Lviv; Attendance: 2,721; Referee: Oleksandr Derdo

4 March 2018 22	Stal Kamianske	0–1	Veres Rivne	Kyiv
14:00 EET (UTC+03:00)	Danielyan (yellow card) 56'	Report	Kulish 30'; Kalenchuk (yellow card) 56'; Lukyanchuk (yellow card) 89'	Stadium: Obolon Arena; Attendance: 250; Referee: Yaroslav Kozyk

11 March 2018 23	Dynamo Kyiv	1–0	Veres Rivne	Kyiv
19:30 EET (UTC+02:00)	Moraes 14'; Shaparenko (yellow card) 70'	Report	Siminin (yellow card) 22'; Morozenko (yellow card) 48'; Adamyuk (yellow card) 51'	Stadium: NSC Olimpiyskiy; Attendance: 4,756; Referee: Kostyantyn Trukhanov

18 March 2018 24	Veres Rivne	0–1	Zorya Luhansk	Lviv
17:00 EET (UTC+02:00)	Lukyanchuk (yellow card) 27'; Karasyuk (yellow card) 64'; Kalenchuk (yellow card) 87'	Report	Kharatin (yellow card) 19'; Checher (yellow card) 28'; Lunyov (yellow card) 45'; Iury 51' (pen.)	Stadium: Arena Lviv; Attendance: 413; Referee: Dmytro Kutakov

31 March 2018 25	Vorskla Poltava	0–0	Veres Rivne	Poltava
17:00 EEST (UTC+03:00)	Kulach (yellow card) 36'; Rebenok (yellow card) 52'; Serhiychuk (yellow card) 67'; Sapay (yellow card) 86'	Report	Kalenchuk (yellow card) 28'	Stadium: Vorskla Stadium; Attendance: 811; Referee: Anatoliy Abdula

7 April 2018 26	Veres Rivne	0–2	Shakhtar Donetsk	Lviv
14:00 EET (UTC+02:00)		Report	Taison 24'; Khocholava 79'	Stadium: Arena Lviv; Attendance: 2,764; Referee: Yuriy Mozharovskyi

14 April 2018 27	FC Mariupol	2–0	Veres Rivne	Mariupol
14:00 EEST (UTC+03:00)	Churko 6'; Yavorskyi (yellow card) 45'; Dawa (yellow card) 49'; Totovytskyi 61'; Ihnatenko (yellow card) 85'; Demiri (yellow card) 86'	Report	Zapadnya (yellow card) 72'	Stadium: Volodymyr Boiko Stadium; Attendance: 3,274; Referee: Dmytro Bondarenko

22 April 2018 28	Veres Rivne	1–4	Dynamo Kyiv	Lviv
17:00 EEST (UTC+03:00)	Julio Cesar 51'	Report	Harmash 14'; Buyalskyi (yellow card) 17'; Burda (yellow card) 28'; Besyedin 47', 53'; González 90+3'	Stadium: Arena Lviv; Attendance: 6,224; Referee: Vitaliy Romanov

29 April 2018 29	Zorya Luhansk	1–0	Veres Rivne	Zaporizhia
14:00 EEST (UTC+03:00)	Checher (yellow card) 8'; Iury (yellow card) 18', (goal) 59'; Andriyevskyi (yellow card) 88'; Kabayev (yellow card) 90+1'	Report	Siminin (yellow card) 31'; Pepi (yellow card) 41'; Adamyuk (red card) 50'; Myahkov (yellow card) 81'	Stadium: Slavutych-Arena; Attendance: 2,081; Referee: Denys Shurman

5 May 2018 30	Veres Rivne	0–0	Vorskla Poltava	Lviv
14:00 EET (UTC+02:00)	Kalenchuk (yellow card) 10'; Lukyanchuk (yellow card) 16'; Pryimak (yellow card) 65'; Morozenko (yellow card) 88'	Report	Giorgadze (yellow card) 13'; Perduta (yellow card) 27'; Sharpar (yellow card) 49'; Kulach (yellow card) 63'	Stadium: Arena Lviv; Attendance: 1,112; Referee: Dmytro Kutakov

13 May 2018 31	Shakhtar Donetsk	1–0	Veres Rivne	Kharkiv
19:30 EET (UTC+02:00)	Marlos 4' (pen.); Kryvtsov (yellow card) 44'; Fred (yellow card) 67'	Report		Stadium: OSC Metalist; Attendance: 4,660; Referee: Yaroslav Kozyk

20 May 2018 32	Veres Rivne	1–1	FC Mariupol	Lviv
17:00 EET (UTC+02:00)	Stepanyuk (yellow card) 57'; Kozhanov 61'; Siminin (yellow card) 69' (yellow-red card) 86'; Kalenchuk (yellow card) 81'	Report	Totovytskyi (yellow card) 43'; Ihnatenko (yellow card) 57'; Boryachuk (yellow card) 71'; Didenko 79'	Stadium: Ukraina Stadium; Attendance: 1,100; Referee: Yuriy Mozharovskyi

=== Ukrainian Cup ===
20 September 2017 Round 3 (1/16)	Ahrobiznes Volochysk	1–2	Veres Rivne	Volochysk
16:00 EEST (UTC+03:00)	Dubchak (yellow card) 104'; Dumanyuk 118'	[ Report]	Morozenko 101'; Skotarenko 111'	Stadium: Yunist Stadium; Referee: Oleksandr Kalyonov

25 October 2017 Round of 16 (1/8)	Arsenal Kyiv	0–1	Veres Rivne	Shchaslyve
13:00 EEST (UTC+03:00)	Shevchenko (yellow card) 72'	Report	Morozenko 19'; Serhiychuk (yellow card) 82'	Stadium: Arsenal-Arena; Referee: Yuriy Hrysyo

29 November 2017 Quarterfinal	Shakhtar Donetsk	4–0	Veres Rivne	Kharkiv
19:30 EET (UTC+02:00)	Ferreyra 7'; Bernard 45'; Khocholava (yellow card) 50'; Petryak (yellow card) 54'; Fred (yellow card) 59'; Marlos 63'; Blanco Leschuk 83'	Report	Zapadnya (yellow card) 27'; Hennadiy Pasich (yellow card) 90+1'	Stadium: OSC Metalist; Referee: Vitaliy Romanov

== Statistics ==
=== Appearances and goals ===
No.	Pos	Nat	Player	Total		Premier League		Cup	
No.	Pos	Nat	Player	Apps	Goals	Apps	Goals	Apps	Goals
Goalkeepers
23	GK	(Ukraine) UKR	Bohdan Sarnavskyi	2	0	2	0	0	0
31	GK	(Ukraine) UKR	Oleksandr Bandura	31	0	30	0	0+1	0
Defenders
3	DF	(Ukraine) UKR	Volodymyr Adamyuk	32	3	30	3	2	0
4	DF	(Ukraine) UKR	Vladyslav Pryimak	8	0	6+2	0	0	0
5	DF	(Ukraine) UKR	Volodymyr Skotarenko	2	1	0	0	2	1
8	DF	(Ukraine) UKR	Serhiy Siminin	30	2	29	2	1	0
16	DF	(Ukraine) UKR	Pavlo Lukyanchuk	7	0	7	0	0	0
20	DF	(Brazil) BRA	Pepi	8	0	3+5	0	0	0
33	DF	(Ukraine) UKR	Serhiy Borzenko	28	2	27	2	1	0
43	DF	(Ukraine) UKR	Artur Zapadnya	18	0	12+3	0	3	0
53	DF	(Ukraine) UKR	Pavlo Myahkov	10	0	6+4	0	0	0
	DF	(Ukraine) UKR	Volodymyr Zavalyak	1	0	0	0	1	0
Midfielders
2	MF	(Ukraine) UKR	Mykyta Kamenyuka	8	0	7+1	0	0	0
6	MF	(Ukraine) UKR	Maksym Kalenchuk	12	0	12	0	0	0
10	MF	(Ukraine) UKR	Yevhen Morozenko	28	3	10+15	1	2+1	2
22	MF	(Ukraine) UKR	Rostyslav Voloshynovych	20	2	13+7	2	0	0
27	MF	(Ukraine) UKR	Maksym Khimchak	1	0	0	0	0+1	0
29	MF	(Ukraine) UKR	Denys Kozhanov	10	1	10	1	0	0
91	MF	(Ukraine) UKR	Roman Karasyuk	34	1	32	1	1+1	0
	MF	(Ukraine) UKR	Oleh Horin	1	0	0	0	0+1	0
	MF	(Ukraine) UKR	Yuriy Berdey	1	0	0	0	0+1	0
Forwards
7	FW	(Ukraine) UKR	Ruslan Stepanyuk	33	2	32	2	0+1	0
11	FW	(Ukraine) UKR	Stanislav Kulish	11	2	10+1	2	0	0
18	FW	(Ukraine) UKR	Vitaliy Mykytyn	2	0	1+1	0	0	0
95	FW	(Brazil) BRA	Julio Cesar	8	1	3+5	1	0	0
Players transferred out during the season
5	MF	(Ukraine) UKR	Valeriy Kucherov	11	0	1+7	0	3	0
9	FW	(Ukraine) UKR	Mykhaylo Serhiychuk	21	6	15+5	6	0+1	0
11	MF	(Ukraine) UKR	Serhiy Hryn	6	0	5+1	0	0	0
16	FW	(Ukraine) UKR	Vasyl Palahnyuk	8	0	0+5	0	3	0
17	MF	(Ukraine) UKR	Anton Kotlyar	15	0	3+9	0	3	0
19	MF	(Spain) ESP	Edgar Caparrós	3	0	0	0	3	0
25	MF	(Ukraine) UKR	Valeriy Fedorchuk	9	1	9	1	0	0
32	DF	(Ukraine) UKR	Mykola Ischenko	11	0	11	0	0	0
41	MF	(Ukraine) UKR	Hennadiy Pasich	17	1	3+11	1	3	0
42	MF	(Ukraine) UKR	Yevhen Pasich	13	1	9+3	1	1	0
47	GK	(Ukraine) UKR	Bohdan Kohut	3	0	0	0	3	0
77	DF	(Ukraine) UKR	Vasyl Kobin	18	2	14+2	2	1+1	0

Source: Competitions

Last updated: 20 May 2018

=== Goalscorers ===
Rank	No.	Pos	Nat	Name	Premier League	Cup	Total
1	9	FW	(Ukraine)	Mykhaylo Serhiychuk	6	0	6
2	3	DF	(Ukraine)	Volodymyr Adamyuk	3	0	3
2	10	MF	(Ukraine)	Yevhen Morozenko	1	2	3
4	7	FW	(Ukraine)	Ruslan Stepanyuk	2	0	2
4	8	DF	(Ukraine)	Serhiy Siminin	2	0	2
4	11	FW	(Ukraine)	Stanislav Kulish	2	0	2
4	22	MF	(Ukraine)	Rostyslav Voloshynovych	2	0	2
4	33	DF	(Ukraine)	Serhiy Borzenko	2	0	2
4	77	DF	(Ukraine)	Vasyl Kobin	2	0	2
10	25	MF	(Ukraine)	Valeriy Fedorchuk	1	0	1
10	29	MF	(Ukraine)	Denys Kozhanov	1	0	1
10	41	MF	(Ukraine)	Hennadiy Pasich	1	0	1
10	42	MF	(Ukraine)	Yevhen Pasich	1	0	1
10	91	MF	(Ukraine)	Roman Karasyuk	1	0	1
10	95	FW	(Brazil)	Julio Cesar	1	0	1
10		DF	(Ukraine)	Volodymyr Skotarenko	0	1	1
				Total	28	3	31

Last updated: 20 May 2018

=== Clean sheets ===
Rank	No.	Pos	Nat	Name	Premier League	Cup	Total
1	31	GK	(Ukraine)	Oleksandr Bandura	9	1	10
1	23	GK	(Ukraine)	Bohdan Sarnavskyi	1	0	1
1	47	GK	(Ukraine)	Bohdan Kohut	0	1	1
				Total	10	2	12

Last updated: 20 May 2017

=== Disciplinary record ===
No.	Pos	Nat	Player	Premier League			Cup			Total		
No.	Pos	Nat	Player	Yellow card	(yellow card) (yellow-red card)	Red card	Yellow card	(yellow card) (yellow-red card)	Red card	Yellow card	(yellow card) (yellow-red card)	Red card
2	MF	(Ukraine)	Mykyta Kamenyuka	1	0	0	0	0	0	1	0	0
3	DF	(Ukraine)	Volodymyr Adamyuk	4	0	1	0	0	0	4	0	1
4	DF	(Ukraine)	Vladyslav Pryimak	1	0	0	0	0	0	1	0	0
6	MF	(Ukraine)	Maksym Kalenchuk	6	0	0	0	0	0	6	0	0
7	FW	(Ukraine)	Ruslan Stepanyuk	4	0	0	0	0	0	4	0	0
8	DF	(Ukraine)	Serhiy Siminin	8	2	0	0	0	0	8	2	0
9	FW	(Ukraine)	Mykhaylo Serhiychuk	4	0	0	1	0	0	5	0	0
10	MF	(Ukraine)	Yevhen Morozenko	5	0	0	0	0	0	5	0	0
11	MF	(Ukraine)	Serhiy Hryn	1	0	0	0	0	0	1	0	0
16	DF	(Ukraine)	Pavlo Lukyanchuk	3	0	0	0	0	0	3	0	0
20	DF	(Brazil)	Pepi	1	0	0	0	0	0	1	0	0
22	MF	(Ukraine)	Rostyslav Voloshynovych	4	0	0	0	0	0	4	0	0
25	MF	(Ukraine)	Valeriy Fedorchuk	3	0	0	0	0	0	3	0	0
31	GK	(Ukraine)	Oleksandr Bandura	4	0	0	0	0	0	4	0	0
32	DF	(Ukraine)	Mykola Ischenko	2	1	0	0	0	0	2	1	0
33	DF	(Ukraine)	Serhiy Borzenko	3	0	0	0	0	0	3	0	0
41	MF	(Ukraine)	Hennadiy Pasich	0	0	0	1	0	0	1	0	0
42	MF	(Ukraine)	Yevhen Pasich	1	0	0	0	0	0	1	0	0
43	DF	(Ukraine)	Artur Zapadnya	2	0	0	1	0	0	3	0	0
53	DF	(Ukraine)	Pavlo Myahkov	1	0	0	0	0	0	1	0	0
77	DF	(Ukraine)	Vasyl Kobin	3	0	0	0	0	0	3	0	0
91	MF	(Ukraine)	Roman Karasyuk	3	0	0	0	0	0	3	0	0
			Total	64	3	1	3	0	0	67	3	1

Last updated: 20 May 2018
