= Caparrós =

Caparrós may refer to:

- Alonso Caparrós, Spanish TV host
- Edgar Caparrós, Spanish footballer
- Joaquín Caparrós, Spanish football coach
- Mabel Caparrós, Argentine politician
- Martín Caparrós, Argentine writer
