= Rostyslav Voloshynovych =

Ukrainian footballer

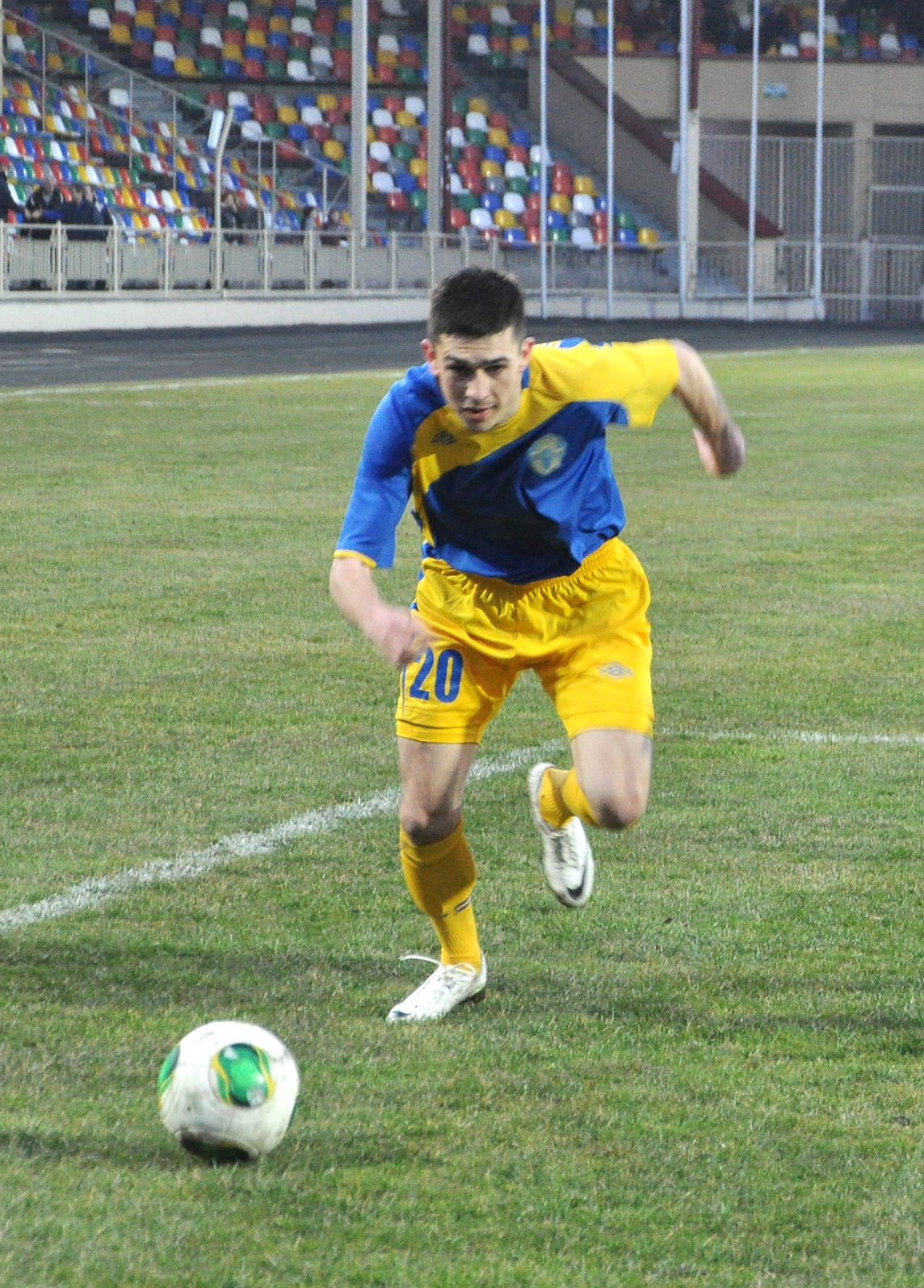
- Rostyslav Voloshynovych in 2015.

Personal information
- Full name: Rostyslav Zinoviyovych Voloshynovych
- Date of birth: 23 May 1991 (age 35)
- Place of birth: Broshniv-Osada, Ukrainian SSR
- Height: 1.78 m (5 ft 10 in)
- Position: Midfielder

Team information
- Current team: Probiy Horodenka

Youth career
- FC Karpaty Broshniv-Osada

Senior career*
Years	Team	Apps	(Gls)
2011–2014	Krono-Karpaty Broshniv-Osada	75	(42)
2014–2015	Ternopil	28	(1)
2015	Nyva Ternopil	14	(4)
2016–2018	Veres Rivne	52	(10)
2018	Lviv	5	(0)
2019–2020	Volyn Lutsk	29	(8)
2020–2023	Prykarpattia Ivano-Frankivsk	36	(6)
2023–	Probiy Horodenka		
- * Club domestic league appearances and goals

Rostyslav Zinoviyovych Voloshynovych (Ukrainian: Ростислав Зіновійович Волошинович; born 23 May 1991) is a Ukrainian football midfielder who plays for Probiy Horodenka.

== Career ==
Voloshynovych is a product of his native FC Karpaty Broshniv-Osada sportive school.

He spent his career as player in the amateur level and in July 2014 signed a contract with the Ukrainian First League team FC Ternopil and subsequently with another team from Ternopil – Nyva.
