= Nazar Stasyshyn =

Ukrainian footballer

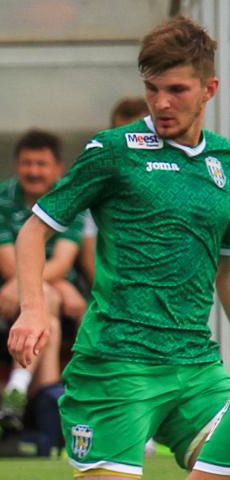
- Stasyshyn playing for Karpaty U-21 in 2017

Personal information
- Full name: Nazar Zenonovych Stasyshyn
- Date of birth: 5 August 1997 (age 29)
- Place of birth: Ukraine
- Height: 1.79 m (5 ft 10 1/2 in)
- Position: Defender

Team information
- Current team: Ahrobiznes Volochysk
- Number: 4

Youth career
- 2011–2014: Skala Stryi

Senior career*
Years	Team	Apps	(Gls)
2014–2015	Skala Stryi	0	(0)
2016	Zorya Truskavets (amateurs)	8	(0)
2016	Skala Stryi	11	(0)
2017–2019	Karpaty Lviv	2	(0)
2018	→ Volyn Lutsk (loan)	0	(0)
2019	Ahrobiznes Volochysk	2	(0)
2020	Mykolaiv		
- * Club domestic league appearances and goals as of 27 July 2019

Nazar Stasyshyn (Ukrainian: Назар Зенонович Стасишин; born 5 August 1997 in Ukraine) is a professional Ukrainian footballer, who plays as a defender.

== Career ==
Stasyshyn is a product of the Skala Stryi Sportive School System.

He spent a half-season as a player in the Ukrainian First League for FC Skala, and in February 2017 signed a contract with the Ukrainian Premier League's FC Karpaty Lviv.
