= Orest Lebedenko =

Ukrainian footballer

Personal information
- Full name: Orest Zinoviyovych Lebedenko
- Date of birth: 23 September 1998 (age 28)
- Place of birth: Lviv, Ukraine
- Height: 1.74 m (5 ft 9 in)
- Position: Left-back

Team information
- Current team: Arouca
- Number: 18

Youth career
- 2012: Pokrova Lviv
- 2013–2015: Karpaty Lviv

Senior career*
Years	Team	Apps	(Gls)
2015–2018	Karpaty Lviv	23	(1)
2019–2023	Lugo	54	(0)
2020–2021	→ Olimpik Donetsk (loan)	33	(0)
2023	Deportivo La Coruña	15	(1)
2023–2025	Vizela	54	(5)
2025–2026	Vitória de Guimarães	14	(0)
2026–	Arouca	4	(0)

International career^{‡}
2018–2020	Ukraine U21	6	(0)
- * Club domestic league appearances and goals as of 29 August 2026 ‡ National team caps and goals as of 14 August 2023

Orest Zinoviyovych Lebedenko (Ukrainian: Орест Зіновійович Лебеденко; born 23 September 1998) is a Ukrainian professional footballer who plays as a left-back for Primeira Liga club Arouca.

== Club career ==
Lebedenko is a product of the FC Pokrova Lviv and FC Karpaty Lviv's Sportive School Systems. He made his debut for Karpaty playing as a start squad player in a match against FC Dynamo Kyiv on 29 July 2017 in the Ukrainian Premier League.

On 21 January 2019, Segunda División side CD Lugo reached an agreement with Karpaty for the transfer of Lebedenko, who signed a four-and-a-half-year contract with the club. His release clause amounts to €3.2 million and his contract is valid until 2023. On 31 January 2020, he was loaned to FC Olimpic Donetsk.

On 21 January 2023, Lebedenko signed for Primera Federación Group 1 club Deportivo de La Coruña on a two-and-a-half-year contract.

On 7 July 2023, Primeira Liga side Vizela announced the signing of Lebedenko on a two-year contract.

On 30 June 2025, Lebedenko moved to Vitória de Guimarães in Primeira Liga on a three-year deal. On 10 January 2026, Lebedenko was on the bench in the Portuguese Taça da Liga final against Braga in which Vitória Guimarães won 2-1.

== Honours ==
Vitória SC

- Taça da Liga: 2025–26
