= Jorge Carrascal =

Colombian footballer (born 1998)

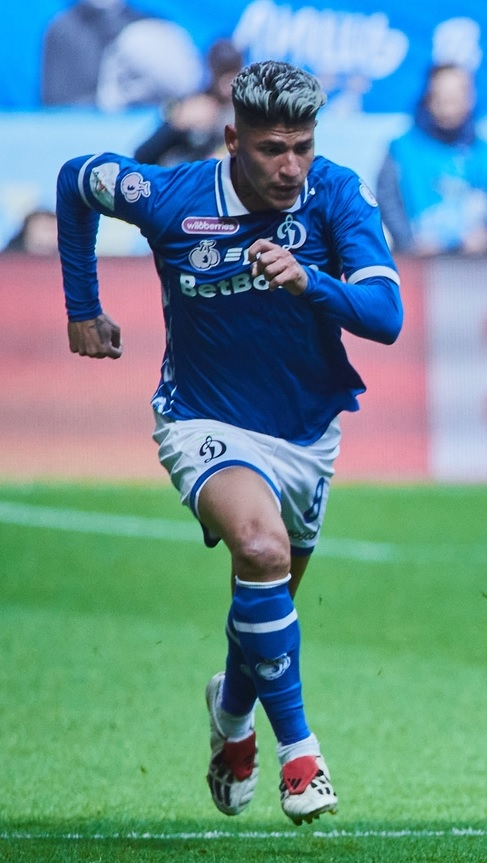
- Carrascal with Dynamo Moscow in 2025

Personal information
- Full name: Jorge Andrés Carrascal Guardo
- Date of birth: 25 May 1998 (age 28)
- Place of birth: Cartagena, Colombia
- Height: 1.80 m (5 ft 11 in)
- Position: Attacking midfielder

Team information
- Current team: Flamengo
- Number: 15

Youth career
- Heroicos
- Millonarios

Senior career*
Years	Team	Apps	(Gls)
2014–2016	Millonarios	2	(0)
2016–2018	Sevilla B	1	(0)
2017–2018	→ Karpaty Lviv (loan)	22	(6)
2018–2019	Karpaty Lviv	16	(0)
2019	→ River Plate (loan)	10	(2)
2020–2022	River Plate	44	(3)
2022	→ CSKA Moscow (loan)	11	(1)
2022–2023	CSKA Moscow	26	(6)
2023–2025	Dynamo Moscow	49	(7)
2025–	Flamengo	35	(5)

International career^{‡}
2013	Colombia U15		
2015	Colombia U17	5	(1)
2020	Colombia U23	7	(3)
2022–	Colombia	24	(2)
Medal record
Men's football
Representing Colombia
Copa América
Runner-up	2024 United States
- * Club domestic league appearances and goals as of 23 May 2026 ‡ National team caps and goals as of 7 June 2026

Jorge Andrés Carrascal Guardo (born 25 May 1998) is a Colombian professional footballer who plays as an attacking midfielder for Campeonato Brasileiro Série A club Flamengo and the Colombia national team.

== Club career ==
Born in Cartagena, Carrascal was a Millonarios youth graduate, after starting it out at CD Heroicos. He made his professional – and Categoría Primera A – debut on 9 November 2014 at the age of only 16, coming on as a late substitute for Luis Hernán Mosquera in a 1–0 away loss against Deportes Tolima.

Carrascal only appeared again 7 November 2015, again from the bench in a 2–0 loss at Independiente Medellín. His first (and only) start for the club came on 17 March 2016, in a 2–0 Copa Colombia home win against Bogotá.

On 25 May 2016, Carrascal moved abroad, signing a five-year deal with Spanish La Liga side Sevilla FC, being immediately assigned to the reserves in Segunda División.

On 13 July 2017, he transferred to Karpaty Lviv in Ukraine at first on loan for a year. In April 2018 Carrascal was recognized as a player of the month in the Ukrainian Premier League.

In 2021, Carrascal won the Argentine Primera División with River Plate.

On 18 February 2022, Carrascal joined CSKA Moscow on loan from River Plate for the remainder of the 2021–22 season. On 20 May 2022, CSKA confirmed that the purchase clause in the loan contract had been activated and Carrascal will be under contract with CSKA from the 2022–23 season until 2026.

On 27 August 2023, Carrascal moved to Dynamo Moscow and signed a four-year contract, with an optional fifth year. He was voted player of the month by Dynamo's fans for March 2024.

On 2 August 2025, Carrascal signed a four-year contract with Flamengo in Brazil.

== International career ==
On 15 September 2022, he received his first call-up to the Colombia national team ahead of the international friendlies scheduled for that month.

He made his debut on 24 September, providing an assist in a 4–1 victory over Guatemala after coming on as a substitute for James Rodríguez.

He scored his first international goal in a 2–2 draw against South Korea in a friendly match.

On 25 May 2026, he was named in head coach Néstor Lorenzo's final 26-man squad for the 2026 FIFA World Cup.

== Personal life ==
In September 2026, he made his relationship with Brazilian model Evellin Nicomedes public.

== Career statistics ==
=== Club ===
As of match played 2 September 2026

Appearances and goals by club, season and competition
Club	Season	League			State League		Cup		Continental		Other		Total	
Club	Season	Division	Apps	Goals	Apps	Goals	Apps	Goals	Apps	Goals	Apps	Goals	Apps	Goals
Millonarios	2014	Categoría Primera A	1	0	—		0	0	0	0	—		1	0
Millonarios	2015	Categoría Primera A	1	0	—		0	0	—		—		1	0
Millonarios	2016	Categoría Primera A	1	0	—		3	0	—		—		4	0
Millonarios	Total		3	0	—		3	0	—		—		6	0
Sevilla Atlético	2016–17	Segunda División	1	0	—		—		—		—		1	0
Karpaty Lviv	2017–18	Ukrainian Premier League	22	6	—		0	0	—		—		22	6
Karpaty Lviv	2018–19	Ukrainian Premier League	16	0	—		2	0	—		—		18	0
Karpaty Lviv	Total		38	6	—		2	0	—		—		40	6
River Plate	2018–19	Argentine Primera División	2	0	—		2	0	0	0	—		4	0
River Plate	2019–20	Argentine Primera División	8	2	—		1 (Note: Appearance in 2019–20 Copa Argentina, played in 2021)	0	3 (Note: Appearances in Copa Libertadores)	0	1 (Note: Appearance in 2019 Supercopa Argentina, played in 2021)	0	13	2
River Plate	2020–21	Argentine Primera División	—		—		—		10	3	10 (Note: Appearances in 2020 Copa de la Liga Profesional)	0	20	3
River Plate	2021	Argentine Primera División	34	3	—		0	0	9	0	1 (Note: Appearance in Trofeo de Campeones de la Liga Profesional)	0	44	3
River Plate	Total		44	5	—		3	0	22	3	12	0	81	8
CSKA Moscow (loan)	2021–22	Russian Premier League	11	1	—		2	0	—		—		13	1
CSKA Moscow	2022–23	Russian Premier League	26	6	—		8	0	—		—		34	6
Dynamo Moscow	2023–24	Russian Premier League	23	0	—		6	1	—		—		29	1
Dynamo Moscow	2024–25	Russian Premier League	26	7	—		8	1	—		—		34	7
Dynamo Moscow	Total		49	7	—		14	1	—		—		63	8
Flamengo	2025	Série A	16	2	0	0	0	0	4	1	3 (Note: Appearances in FIFA Intercontinental Cup)	0	23	3
Flamengo	2026	Série A	20	5	7	1	1	0	7	0	3 (Note: Two appearances in Recopa Sudamericana, one appearance in Supercopa do Brasil)	0	38	5
Flamengo	Total		36	7	7	1	1	0	11	0	6	0	61	8
Career total			208	32	7	1	33	2	33	4	18	0	299	39

=== International ===
As of match played 7 June 2026

Appearances and goals by national team and year
National team	Year	Apps	Goals
Colombia	2022	3	0
Colombia	2023	8	1
Colombia	2024	7	1
Colombia	2025	3	0
Colombia	2026	3	0
Total		24	2

No.	Date	Venue	Opponent	Score	Result	Competition
1	24 March 2023	Ulsan Munsu Football Stadium, Ulsan, South Korea	South Korea	2–2	2–2	Friendly
2	8 June 2024	Commanders Field, Maryland, U.S.A	United States	4–1	5–1	Friendly

== Honours ==
River Plate

- Argentine Primera División: 2021
- Copa Argentina: 2018–19
- Recopa Sudamericana: 2019
- Supercopa Argentina: 2019
- Trofeo de Campeones: 2021

CSKA Moscow

- Russian Cup: 2022–23

Flamengo

- FIFA Challenger Cup: 2025
- FIFA Derby of the Americas: 2025
- Copa Libertadores: 2025
- Campeonato Brasileiro Série A: 2025, 2026
- Campeonato Carioca: 2026
- FIFA Intercontinental Cup runner-up: 2025

Individual

- Ukrainian Premier League Player of the Month: April 2018
- Copa Libertadores Team of the Tournament: 2025
