= Yhonatan Bedoya =

Colombian footballer (born 1996)

Personal information
- Full name: Yhonatan Fernando Bedoya Quintero
- Date of birth: 17 October 1996 (age 30)
- Place of birth: Medellín, Colombia
- Height: 1.77 m (5 ft 9 1/2 in)
- Position: Striker

Youth career
- 2014–2015: Espanyol B

Senior career*
| Years | Team | Apps | (Gls) |
| 2015–2017 | Espanyol B | 48 | (4) |
| 2018–2019 | Karpaty Lviv | 1 | (0) |
- * Club domestic league appearances and goals as of 3 May 2019

Yhonatan Fernando Bedoya Quintero (born 17 October 1996) is a Colombian professional footballer who plays as a striker.

== Club career ==
Born in Medellín, Bedoya was transferred to Spain in 2014 to play for RCD Espanyol and two seasons he played for its reserves team in the Segunda División B.

In January 2018 Bedoya moved to Ukraine, signing a deal with Ukrainian Premier League side FC Karpaty Lviv.
