= Volodymyr Senytsya =

Ukrainian footballer

Personal information
- Full name: Volodymyr Andriyovych Senytsya
- Date of birth: 26 April 1997 (age 29)
- Place of birth: Kalush, Ivano-Frankivsk Oblast, Ukraine
- Height: 1.88 m (6 ft 2 in)
- Position: Centre-back

Youth career
- –2010: Youth Sportive School Kalush
- 2010–2014: UFK Lviv

Senior career*
Years	Team	Apps	(Gls)
2014–2018	Karpaty Lviv	2	(0)
2018–2019	Bałtyk Koszalin	8	(0)
2019	Kalush	23	(0)
2020	Inhulets Petrove	5	(0)
2020	Epitsentr Dunaivtsi	6	(0)
2021	Krystal Kherson	13	(0)
2021	Epitsentr Dunaivtsi	16	(0)

International career
2015	Ukraine U18	2	(0)
2015	Ukraine U19	8	(0)
- * Club domestic league appearances and goals as of 21:14, 2 February 2023 (UTC)

Volodymyr Senytsya (Ukrainian: Володимир Андрійович Сениця; born 26 April 1997) is a Ukrainian professional footballer who plays as a centre-back.

== Career ==
Senytsya is the product of the Kalush and UFK Lviv School Systems. He made his debut for FC Karpaty playing full-time in a match against FC Mariupol on 18 November 2017 in the Ukrainian Premier League.

He also played for the Ukrainian under-18 national football team and was called up for other age level representations.
