= Catriel Sánchez =

Argentine footballer (born 1998)

Personal information
- Full name: Catriel Ignacio Sánchez
- Date of birth: 17 July 1998 (age 28)
- Place of birth: Las Varillas, Córdoba Province, Argentina
- Height: 1.78 m (5 ft 10 in)
- Position: Striker

Team information
- Current team: Defensores Unidos

Youth career
- 200?–2017: Talleres

Senior career*
Years	Team	Apps	(Gls)
2017–2023	Talleres	2	(0)
2018	→ Karpaty Lviv (loan)	9	(1)
2019–2021	→ Villa Dálmine (loan)	21	(6)
2021	→ Atenas (loan)	20	(6)
2022	→ Estudiantes BA (loan)	8	(0)
2022	→ Instituto (loan)	6	(0)
2023	→ Flandria (loan)	21	(4)
2024	San Miguel	11	(1)
2025–	Defensores Unidos	2	(0)
- * Club domestic league appearances and goals as of 18:01, 30 July 2025 (UTC)

Catriel Ignacio Sánchez (born 17 July 1998) is an Argentine professional footballer who plays as a striker for Defensores Unidos.

== Career ==
Sánchez is a product of Talleres de Córdoba youth sportive system and made his debut for this club in the Argentine Primera División in June 2017. In February 2018, was announced that he was close for signing of a contract with the Ukrainian Premier League club FC Karpaty Lviv. He signed contract with Ukrainian club on 1 March 2018.
