= Nazar Verbnyi =

Ukrainian footballer (born 1997)

Personal information
- Full name: Nazar Bohdanovych Verbnyi
- Date of birth: 26 July 1997 (age 29)
- Place of birth: Lviv, Ukraine
- Height: 1.80 m (5 ft 11 in)
- Position: Midfielder

Team information
- Current team: Wiki Sanok

Youth career
- 2006–2014: Karpaty Lviv

Senior career*
Years	Team	Apps	(Gls)
2014–2019	Karpaty Lviv	49	(0)
2017	→ Rukh Vynnyky (loan)	10	(3)
2019	→ Rukh Vynnyky (loan)	9	(0)
2020	Olimpik Donetsk	5	(0)
2020–2021	Karpaty Halych	19	(3)
2021–2022	Ahrobiznes Volochysk	20	(0)
2022–2023	SK Bischofshofen	30	(4)
2023	Korona Rzeszów	0	(0)
2023–2026	Cosmos Nowotaniec	82	(39)
2026	JKS Jarosław	17	(2)
2026–	Wiki Sanok	0	(0)

International career
2012	Ukraine U16	2	(0)
- * Club domestic league appearances and goals as of 21:28, 25 June 2026 (UTC)

Nazar Bohdanovych Verbnyi (Ukrainian: Назар Богданович Вербний; born 26 July 1997) is a Ukrainian professional footballer who plays as a midfielder for regional league club Wiki Sanok.

== Club career ==
Verbnyi is a product of the FC Karpaty Lviv School System. His first coach was Vasyl Leskiv. He made his first-team debut for Karpaty in a league match against Chornomorets Odesa on 17 September 2016.

== International career ==
He also played for Ukraine national under-16 football team.

== Personal life ==
His older brother Volodymyr is also a footballer.

== Honours ==
Cosmos Nowotaniec

- Polish Cup (Krosno regionals): 2024–25

JKS Jarosław

- IV liga Subcarpathia: 2025–26
