= Guido Corteggiano =

Argentine footballer

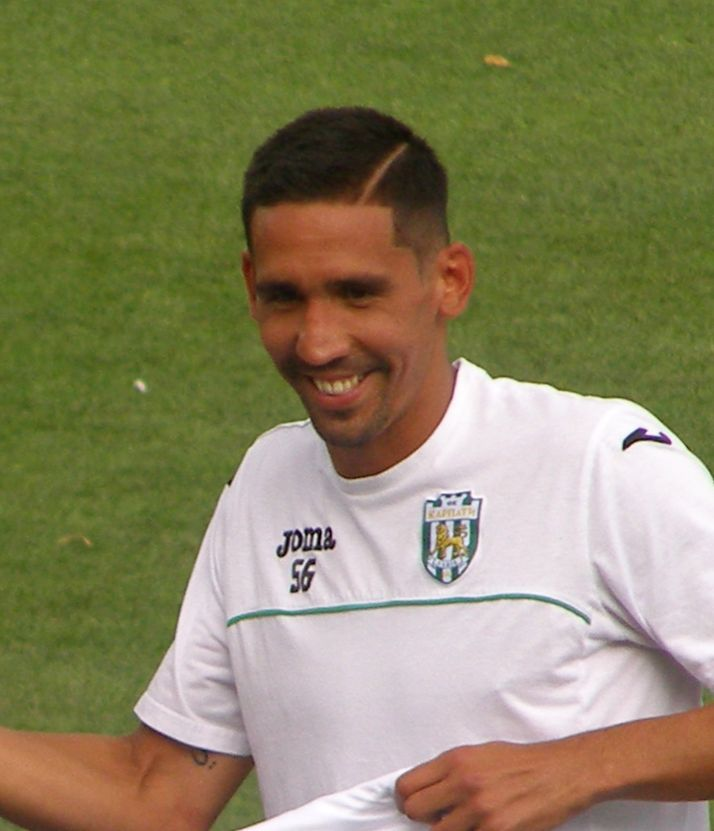
- Corteggiano in 2017

Personal information
- Full name: Guido Sebastian Corteggiano
- Date of birth: 23 June 1987 (age 39)
- Place of birth: Buenos Aires, Argentina
- Height: 1.83 m (6 ft 0 in)
- Positions: Midfielder; left back

Team information
- Current team: SSD Union Vis Lendinara

Senior career*
Years	Team	Apps	(Gls)
2006–2007	Brera		
2007–2009	Valle d'Aosta	41	(4)
2009–2010	Borgosesia	13	(0)
2011–2012	Borgomanero	30	(5)
2012–2013	Voghera	34	(0)
2013–2014	RapalloBogliasco	28	(0)
2014–2015	Cuneo	34	(2)
2015	Bra	16	(0)
2015–2016	Lecco	20	(5)
2016–2017	Triestina	25	(1)
2017	Karpaty Lviv	9	(0)
2017–2018	Lecco	5	(0)
2018–2023	Mestre	122	(14)
2023	United Borgoricco Campetra		
2023–2024	Darfo Boario		
2024	Rovigo Calcio		
2024–	SSD Union Vis Lendinara		
- * Club domestic league appearances and goals as of 10 November 2026

Guido Sebastian Corteggiano (born 23 June 1987) is an Argentine professional footballer who plays as a midfielder for SSD Union Vis Lendinara.

== Career ==
During his professional career he mainly played for Italian Serie D clubs, where he capped 211 matches and scored 12 goals. He also spent one season in Eccellenza (fifth level in Italian football), where he capped 30 matches and scored 5 goals.

In July 2017 he signed a 1-year deal with the Ukrainian Premier League side Karpaty Lviv. He made his debut in the Ukrainian Premier League for Karpaty Lviv on 16 July 2017, playing in a match against Zirka Kropyvnytskyi.

On 22 September 2018, A.C. Mestre announced the signing of Corteggiano.
