= Roman Pidkivka =

Ukrainian footballer

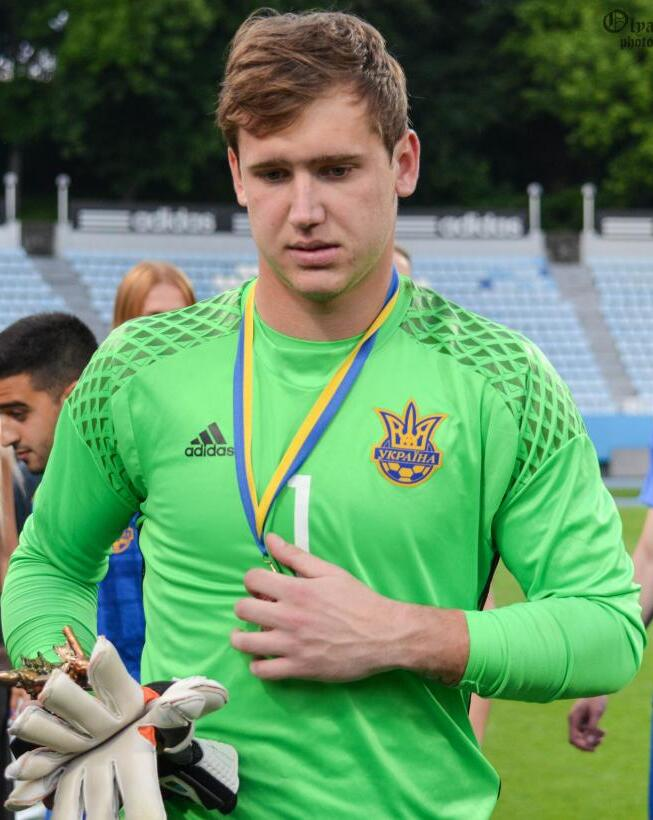

Personal information
- Full name: Roman Yuriyovych Pidkivka
- Date of birth: 9 May 1995 (age 31)
- Place of birth: Lviv, Ukraine
- Height: 1.90 m (6 ft 3 in)
- Position: Goalkeeper

Team information
- Current team: Ahrobiznes Volochysk
- Number: 77

Youth career
- 2008–2009: Karpaty Lviv
- 2009: Volyn Lutsk
- 2009–2012: Karpaty Lviv

Senior career*
Years	Team	Apps	(Gls)
2012–2018	Karpaty Lviv	47	(0)
2019	Arsenal Kyiv	14	(0)
2019	Karpaty Lviv	10	(0)
2020–2021	Chornomorets Odesa	14	(0)
2022–2024	Inhulets Petrove	1	(0)
2024–	Ahrobiznes Volochysk	36	(0)

International career^{‡}
2014	Ukraine U19	1	(0)
2014–2015	Ukraine U20	4	(0)
2016	Ukraine U21	10	(0)
- * Club domestic league appearances and goals as of 3 June 2026 ‡ National team caps and goals as of 22 February 2019

Roman Yuriyovych Pidkivka (Ukrainian: Роман Юрійович Підківка; born 9 May 1995) is a Ukrainian professional footballer who plays as a goalkeeper for Ahrobiznes Volochysk.

== Career ==
Pidkivka is the product of the Karpaty Lviv Youth School System.

He made his debut for FC Karpaty playing against FC Vorskla Poltava on 14 July 2013 in Ukrainian Premier League.

In February 2019, Pidkivka moved to Arsenal Kyiv on a free transfer. He made his league debut for the club on 24 February 2019 in a 2–0 away defeat to FC Desna.
