= Edgar Caparrós =

Spanish footballer (born 1997)

Personal information
- Full name: Edgar Caparrós Ruiz
- Date of birth: 19 March 1997 (age 29)
- Place of birth: Palafolls, Spain
- Height: 1.82 m (6 ft 0 in)
- Positions: Defender; midfielder

Team information
- Current team: Budoni

Youth career
- Fundació Calella
- Badalona
- –2015: Girona
- 2015–2016: Trenčín

Senior career*
| Years | Team | Apps | (Gls) |
| 2016 | Zugdidi | 2 | (0) |
| 2017–2018 | Veres Rivne | 0 | (0) |
| 2018 | Rieti | 0 | (0) |
| 2018–2019 | Socuéllamos | 3 | (0) |
| 2019–2020 | Torrijos | 10 | (0) |
| 2020 | Mynai | 0 | (0) |
| 2021–2022 | FAVL Cimini | | |
| 2022– | Budoni | 4 | (0) |
- * Club domestic league appearances and goals as of 8 October 2023

Edgar Caparrós Ruiz (born 19 March 1997) is a Spanish footballer who plays for Italian Serie D club Budoni.

== Career ==
In 2017, he signed for Ukrainian top flight outfit Veres Rivne, making 3 Cup appearances there.

In 2018, he signed for Rieti in the Italian third division, failing to make an appearance there, before playing for Spanish fourth division teams Socuéllamos and Torrijos.

In 2020, Caparrós returned to the Ukrainian top flight with FC Mynai. On 16 December 2020 he left FC Mynai.
