= Yevhen Morozenko =

Ukrainian footballer

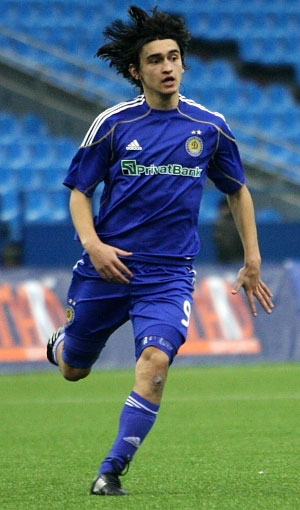

Personal information
- Full name: Yevhen Serhiyovych Morozenko
- Date of birth: 16 December 1991 (age 34)
- Place of birth: Kyiv, Ukraine
- Height: 1.78 m (5 ft 10 in)
- Position: Midfielder

Team information
- Current team: Lisne
- Number: 10

Youth career
- 2004–2007: Vidradnyi Kyiv
- 2007–2008: Dynamo Kyiv

Senior career*
Years	Team	Apps	(Gls)
2008–2015	Dynamo Kyiv	0	(0)
2008–2012	→ Dynamo-2 Kyiv	110	(12)
2012	→ Slovan Liberec (loan)	4	(0)
2013	→ Dynamo-2 Kyiv	14	(2)
2013	→ Hoverla Uzhhorod (loan)	0	(0)
2014–2015	→ Dynamo-2 Kyiv	24	(0)
2015	Oleksandriya	4	(0)
2016	Guria Lanchkhuti	27	(5)
2017–2018	Veres Rivne	38	(2)
2018	Olimpik Donetsk	2	(0)
2019	Chornomorets Odesa	9	(0)
2019	Veres Rivne	9	(0)
2020–2021	Cherkashchyna	20	(0)
2021–2023	Livyi Bereh Kyiv	0	(0)
2023–2024	Shturm Ivankiv	0	(0)
2024–	Lisne	10	(0)

International career
2007	Ukraine-16	5	(0)
2007–2008	Ukraine-17	9	(0)
2008–2009	Ukraine-18	8	(3)
2008–2010	Ukraine-19	16	(2)
- * Club domestic league appearances and goals as of 22 June 2025

Yevhen Morozenko (Ukrainian: Євген Сергійович Морозенко; born 16 December 1991 in Kyiv) is a Ukraine football midfielder who plays for Lisne.

Morozenko is a product of Dynamo Kyiv football academy.
