= 2019–20 FC Kolos Kovalivka season =

Kolos Kovalivka
2019–20 season
- President: Andriy Zasukha
- Manager: Ruslan Kostyshyn
- Stadium: Obolon Arena, Kyiv
- Ukrainian Premier League: 6th
- Ukrainian Cup: Round of 16 (1/8)
- Top goalscorer: League: Volodymyr Lysenko (6); All: Volodymyr Lysenko (6)
- Highest home attendance: 5,073 (vs FC Mariupol, 29 July 2020)
- Lowest home attendance: 0 (all home matches were played behind closed doors starting 21 June until 25 July)
- Average home league attendance: 2,156
Home colours	Away colours	Third colours

The 2019–20 season was a debut season in the top Ukrainian football league for Kolos Kovalivka. Kolos competed in Premier League and Ukrainian Cup. After winning play-off matches in Premier League Kolos qualified for European club tournament for the next season for the first time in club's history.

== Players ==
=== Squad information ===
As of 29 July 2020

Squad no.	Name	Nationality	Position	Date of birth (age)
Goalkeepers
1	Anton Yashkov	(Ukraine)	GK	30 January 1992 (aged 28)
25	Yevhen Volynets	(Ukraine)	GK	26 August 1993 (aged 26)
71	Yevhen Kucherenko ^{List B}	(Ukraine)	GK	27 August 1999 (aged 20)
Defenders
3	Illya Kovalenko ^{List B}	(Ukraine)	DF	23 July 2001 (aged 19)
5	Kyrylo Petrov	(Ukraine)	DF	22 June 1990 (aged 30)
6	Maksym Maksymenko	(Ukraine)	DF	28 May 1990 (aged 30)
15	Oleksandr Chornomorets	(Ukraine)	DF	5 April 1993 (aged 27)
24	Oleksiy Zozulya	(Ukraine)	DF	15 April 1992 (aged 28)
67	Vadym Paramonov	(Ukraine)	DF	18 March 1991 (aged 29)
80	Yevhen Yefremov	(Ukraine)	DF	17 January 1994 (aged 26)
Midfielders
8	Yevhen Smyrnyi ^{List B} (on loan from Dynamo Kyiv)	(Ukraine)	MF	18 August 1998 (aged 21)
9	Denys Antyukh	(Ukraine)	MF	21 February 1997 (aged 23)
10	Yevhen Morozko	(Ukraine)	MF	15 February 1993 (aged 27)
11	Oleh Kozhushko ^{List B} (on loan from SC Dnipro-1)	(Ukraine)	MF	17 February 1998 (aged 22)
13	Vitaliy Havrysh (Captain)	(Ukraine)	MF	18 March 1986 (aged 34)
14	Vadym Milko	(Ukraine)	MF	22 August 1986 (aged 33)
18	Denys Kostyshyn	(Ukraine)	MF	31 August 1997 (aged 22)
19	Stanislav Sorokin ^{List B}	(Ukraine)	MF	3 May 2000 (aged 20)
29	Vladyslav Yemets (on loan from Zorya Luhansk)	(Ukraine)	MF	9 September 1997 (aged 22)
48	Pavlo Orikhovskyi	(Ukraine)	MF	13 May 1996 (aged 24)
69	Oleh Ilyin	(Ukraine)	MF	8 June 1997 (aged 23)
81	Vladislavs Soloveičiks	(Latvia)	MF	25 May 1999 (aged 21)
89	Oleksandr Volkov (on loan from Desna Chernihiv)	(Ukraine)	MF	7 February 1989 (aged 31)
90	Andriy Bohdanov	(Ukraine)	MF	21 January 1990 (aged 30)
94	Mamadou Danfa	(Senegal)	MF	6 March 2001 (aged 19)
99	Yevhen Zadoya	(Ukraine)	MF	5 January 1991 (aged 29)
Forwards
7	Volodymyr Lysenko	(Ukraine)	FW	20 April 1988 (aged 32)
17	Oleksandr Bondarenko	(Ukraine)	FW	28 July 1989 (aged 31)
27	Kyrylo Senko ^{List B}	(Ukraine)	FW	19 November 2002 (aged 17)
77	Árni Vilhjálmsson	(Iceland)	FW	4 May 1994 (aged 26)

== Transfers ==
=== In ===
Date	Pos.	Player	Age	Moving from	Type	Fee	Source
Summer
11 July 2019	DF	(Ukraine) Vadym Paramonov	28	(Ukraine) FC Lviv	Transfer	Free	
23 July 2019	DF	(Ukraine) Illya Malyshkin	19	(Ukraine) Dynamo Kyiv	Transfer	Undisclosed	
23 July 2019	FW	(Ukraine) Oleh Osypenko	17	(Ukraine) Arsenal Kyiv	Transfer	Undisclosed	
4 August 2019	MF	(Ukraine) Kamil Khuchbarov	19	(Ukraine) SC Dnipro-1	Transfer	Undisclosed	
4 August 2019	MF	(Ukraine) Pavlo Orikhovskyi	23	(Ukraine) Dynamo Kyiv	Transfer	Undisclosed	
22 November 2019	FW	(Iceland) Árni Vilhjálmsson	25	(Poland) Termalica Nieciecza	Transfer	Free	
2 July 2019	MF	(Ukraine) Yehor Demchenko	22	(Ukraine) Avanhard Kramatorsk	Loan		
11 July 2019	MF	(Ukraine) Yevhen Smyrnyi	20	(Ukraine) Dynamo Kyiv	Loan		
26 July 2019	FW	(Ukraine) Oleh Kozhushko	21	(Ukraine) SC Dnipro-1	Loan		
22 August 2019	MF	(Ukraine) Oleksandr Volkov	30	(Ukraine) Desna Chernihiv	Loan		
Winter
16 January 2020	DF	(Ukraine) Kyrylo Petrov	29	(Azerbaijan) Neftçi Baku	Transfer	Free	
16 January 2020	DF	(Ukraine) Yevhen Yefremov	26	(Ukraine) Obolon-Brovar Kyiv	Transfer	Free	
16 January 2020	MF	(Ukraine) Andriy Bohdanov	29	(Ukraine) Desna Chernihiv	Transfer	Free	
16 January 2020	MF	(Latvia) Vladislavs Soloveičiks	20	(Latvia) Valmieras FK	Transfer	Free	
20 February 2020	GK	(Ukraine) Yevhen Kucherenko	20	(Portugal) Leiria	Transfer	Free	
3 June 2020	MF	(Senegal) Mamadou Danfa	19	(Senegal) Casa Sports	Transfer	Undisclosed	
31 December 2019	DF	(Ukraine) Vladyslav Okhronchuk	22	(Ukraine) Podillya Khmelnytskyi	Loan return		
31 December 2019	MF	(Ukraine) Denys Antyukh	22	(Ukraine) Balkany Zorya	Loan return		
16 January 2020	MF	(Ukraine) Vladyslav Yemets	22	(Ukraine) Zorya Luhansk	Loan		

=== Out ===
Date	Pos.	Player	Age	Moving to	Type	Fee	Source
Summer
31 May 2019	GK	(Ukraine) Serhiy Sitalo	32	Unattached	Transfer	Free	
9 July 2019	DF	(Ukraine) Artem Terekhov	27	(Ukraine) Obolon-Brovar Kyiv	Transfer	Free	
31 May 2019	MF	(Ukraine) Maksym Banasevych	24	(Ukraine) Desna Chernihiv	Loan return		
3 September 2019	MF	(Ukraine) Yehor Demchenko	22	(Ukraine) Avanhard Kramatorsk	Loan return		
1 August 2019	DF	(Ukraine) Vladyslav Okhronchuk	22	(Ukraine) Podillya Khmelnytskyi	Loan		
26 August 2019	MF	(Ukraine) Denys Antyukh	22	(Ukraine) Balkany Zorya	Loan		
26 August 2019	MF	(Ukraine) Arsentiy Doroshenko	19	(Ukraine) Podillya Khmelnytskyi	Loan		
Winter
1 January 2020	DF	(Ukraine) Vladyslav Okhronchuk	22	Unattached	Transfer	Free	
24 January 2020	FW	(Ukraine) Vladyslav Nekhtiy	28	(Ukraine) Avanhard Kramatorsk	Transfer	Free	
27 January 2020	MF	(Ukraine) Oleksandr Pozdeyev	33	Retired	Transfer	Free	
9 February 2020	DF	(Ukraine) Andriy Sakhnevych	30	(Latvia) Ventspils	Transfer	Free	
14 February 2020	MF	(Ukraine) Dzhemal Kyzylatesh	25	(Ukraine) Volyn Lutsk	Transfer	Free	
26 February 2020	MF	(Ukraine) Vyacheslav Ryabov	30	(Ukraine) Hirnyk Kryvyi Rih	Transfer	Free	
27 February 2020	MF	(Ukraine) Kamil Khuchbarov	20	(Ukraine) VPK-Ahro Shevchenkivka	Transfer / Loan ?	Undisclosed	
2 March 2020	MF	(Ukraine) Illya Malyshkin	19	(Ukraine) Hirnyk-Sport Horishni Plavni	Transfer / Loan ?	Undisclosed	
7 March 2020	DF	(Ukraine) Oleksandr Mihunov	25	(Belarus) Rukh Brest	Transfer	Free	
20 February 2020	FW	(Ukraine) Rustam Akhmedzade	19	(Ukraine) Podillya Khmelnytskyi	Loan		

== Pre-season and friendlies ==
3 July 2019 Friendly	Kolos Kovalivka	2–0	Balkany Zorya	Uman
17:00 EEST (UTC+03:00)	Bondarenko 69', 77'	Report		Attendance: 200

6 July 2019 Friendly	Kolos Kovalivka	2–3	Kremin Kremenchuk	Mala Soltanivka
11:00 EEST (UTC+03:00)	Pozdeyev 41' (pen.); Morozko 45'	Report	15'; 71', 88'	Stadium: Saltik; Attendance: 50

6 July 2019 Friendly	Kolos Kovalivka	2–1	Balkany Zorya	Kyiv
17:00 EEST (UTC+03:00)	Ilyin 39'; Fedorov 49'	Report	55'	Stadium: Dynamo Training Center; Attendance: 50

10 July 2019 Friendly	Obolon-Brovar Kyiv	0–1	Kolos Kovalivka	Kyiv
18:00 EEST (UTC+03:00)		Report	Nekhtiy 55'	Stadium: Obolon Arena; Attendance: 150

13 July 2019 Friendly	Kolos Kovalivka	6–0	MFC Mykolaiv	Bucha
EEST (UTC+03:00)	Morozko 7', 23', 29'; Smyrnyi 21'; Bondarenko 34'; Ilyin 45'	Report		Stadium: Yuvileynyi; Attendance: 50

16 July 2019 Friendly	Kolos Kovalivka	1–0	Karpaty Lviv	Kyiv
EEST (UTC+03:00)	Zadoya 34'	Report		Stadium: Dynamo Training Center; Attendance: 50

19 July 2019 Friendly	Shakhtar Donetsk	2–0	Kolos Kovalivka	Kyiv
EEST (UTC+03:00)	Fernando 22'; Sikan 65'	Report		Stadium: Svyatoshin olympic complex

21 July 2019 Friendly	Dynamo Kyiv	1–3	Kolos Kovalivka	Kyiv
16:00 EEST (UTC+03:00)	Besyedin 58'	Report	Havrysh 55' (pen.); Nekhtiy 75'; Chornomorets 92'	Stadium: Dynamo Stadium; Attendance: 1,500

5 September 2019 Friendly	Shakhtar Donetsk	1–1	Kolos Kovalivka	Kyiv
11:00 EEST (UTC+03:00)	Muravskyi 85'	Report	Lysenko 52'	Stadium: Svyatoshin olympic complex Attendance: 100

13 October 2019 Friendly	Olimpik Donetsk	2–0	Kolos Kovalivka	Shchaslyve
15:00 EEST (UTC+03:00)	Zahedi 37', 81'	Report		Stadium: Olimpik training facility

20 January 2020 Friendly	Kolos Kovalivka (Ukraine)	3–0	(Romania) Academica Clinceni	Side, Turkey
15:30 EET (UTC+02:00)	20'; Kozhushko 58'; Morozko 73'	Report		Stadium: Kamelya Collections Hotels

23 January 2020 Friendly	Kolos Kovalivka (Ukraine)	2–1	(Romania) Astra Giurgiu	Antalya, Turkey
16:00 EET (UTC+02:00)	Bohdanov 21'; Antyukh 89'	Report	Gheorghe 33'	Stadium: Lara hotel

26 January 2020 Friendly	Kolos Kovalivka (Ukraine)	1–1	(Kosovo) FC Prishtina	Belek, Turkey
15:00 EET (UTC+02:00)	Smyrnyi 6'	Report	17' (o.g.)	Stadium: Titanic

28 January 2020 Friendly	Kolos Kovalivka (Ukraine)	4–2	(South Korea) Ansan Greeners	Belek, Turkey
10:00 EET (UTC+02:00)	Antyukh 18', 40', 59'; Volkov 43'	Report	40'; 45'	Stadium: Limak Atlantis

28 January 2020 Friendly	Kolos Kovalivka (Ukraine)	2–0	(Austria) Vorwärts Steyr	Belek, Turkey
15:30 EET (UTC+02:00)	Ilyin 45'; Antyukh 77'	Report		Stadium: Limak Atlantis

7 February 2020 Friendly	Kolos Kovalivka (Ukraine)	2–2	(Uzbekistan) Nasaf Qarshi	Belek, Turkey
15:00 EET (UTC+02:00)	Havrysh (pen.); Volkov	Report	Goal

8 February 2020 Friendly	Kolos Kovalivka (Ukraine)	1–2	(Slovakia) Spartak Trnava	Belek, Turkey
14:00 EET (UTC+02:00)	Vilhjálmsson 60'	Report	20'; 54'

11 February 2020 Friendly	Kolos Kovalivka (Ukraine)	0–1	(Kazakhstan) Zhetysu	Belek, Turkey
16:00 EET (UTC+02:00)		Report	25'	Stadium: Sueno Hotels Deluxe

12 February 2020 Friendly	Kolos Kovalivka (Ukraine)	0–0	(Uzbekistan) Navbahor Namangan	Belek, Turkey
EET (UTC+02:00)		Report

15 February 2020 Friendly	Kolos Kovalivka (Ukraine)	2–0	(Poland) Podbeskidzie Bielsko-Biała	Belek, Turkey
10:00 EET (UTC+02:00)	Bondarenko; Kozhushko	Report

15 February 2020 Friendly	Kolos Kovalivka (Ukraine)	1–2	(Belarus) Shakhtyor Soligorsk	Belek, Turkey
16:00 EET (UTC+02:00)	Smyrnyi 19'	Report	Kendysh 17'; Diasamidze 37'	Stadium: Titanic Delux

23 May 2020 Friendly	Kolos Kovalivka	1–2	Olimpik Donetsk	Mala Soltanivka
17:00 EEST (UTC+03:00)	Maksymenko 105'	Report	Do Couto 73'; Lebedenko 85'	Stadium: Saltik; Referee: Serhiy Boyko

20 July 2020 Friendly	Kolos Kovalivka	0–3	Veres Rivne	Demydiv
EEST (UTC+03:00)		Report	Shestakov 36', 45'; Yaremenko 84'

== Competitions ==
=== Overall ===
Competition	First match	Last match	Starting round	Final position	Record							
Competition	First match	Last match	Starting round	Final position	Pld	W	D	L	GF	GA	GD	Win %
Premier League	31 July 2019	29 July 2020	Matchday 1	6th	34	12	2	20	38	60	−22	35.29
Cup	30 October 2019	30 October 2019	Round of 16 (1/8)	Round of 16 (1/8)	1	0	0	1	0	1	−1	0.00
Total					35	12	2	21	38	61	−23	34.29

Last updated: 29 July 2020
Source: Competitions

=== Premier League ===
==== League table ====
Pos	Team	Pld	W	D	L	GF	GA	GD	Pts	Qualification or relegation
2	Dynamo Kyiv	32	18	5	9	65	35	+30	59	Qualification for the Champions League third qualifying round
3	Zorya Luhansk	32	17	7	8	50	29	+21	58	Qualification for the Europa League group stage
4	Desna Chernihiv	32	17	5	10	59	33	+26	56	Qualification for the Europa League third qualifying round
5	FC Oleksandriya	32	14	7	11	49	47	+2	49	Qualification for the playoff for Europa League second qualifying round
6	Kolos Kovalivka (O)	32	10	2	20	33	59	−26	32	Qualification for the playoff for Europa League second qualifying round

Source: Ukrainian Premier League, UEFA, Soccerway
Rules for classification: 1) Points; 2) Head-to-head points; 3) Head-to-head goal difference; 4) Head-to-head higher number of goals scored; 5) Goal difference; 6) Higher number of goals scored; 7) Draw or "golden match" if tied for title (Article 22, paragraph 3).
(O) Play-off winners

==== Results summary ====
Overall								Home						Away					
Pld	W	D	L	GF	GA	GD	Pts	W	D	L	GF	GA	GD	W	D	L	GF	GA	GD
34	12	2	20	38	60	−22	38	9	1	8	26	26	0	3	1	12	12	34	−22

Last updated: 29 July 2020.
Source: Competitive matches

==== Results by round ====
Round	1	2	3	4	5	6	7	8	9	10	11	12	13	14	15	16	17	18	19	20	21	22	23	24	25	26	27	28	29	30	31	32
Ground	H	A	H	A	H	A	H	H	A	H	A	A	H	A	H	A	H	A	A	H	A	H	A	H	A	H	A	H	A	H	A	H
Result	W	W	L	D	L	L	W	D	W	L	L	L	L	L	W	L	W	L	W	W	L	L	L	L	L	L	L	W	L	L	L	W
Position	4	3	5	4	6	8	5	7	6	6	6	7	8	8	8	9	6	7	6	6	6	6	6	6	6	6	6	6	6	6	6	6

Updated to match(es) played on 19 July 2020. Source: Competitive matches
A = Away; H = Home; W = Win; D = Draw; L = Loss

==== Matches ====
30 July 2019 1	Kolos Kovalivka	2–1	FC Mariupol	Kyiv
19:00 EEST (UTC+03:00)	Smyrnyi 41'; Maksymenko (yellow card) 56' (yellow-red card) 84'; Havrysh 67'; Ilyin (yellow card) 70'	Report	Vakula (yellow card) 12'; Fomin 15', (yellow card) 90+3'; Putrya (yellow card) 64'; Yavorskyi (yellow card) 65'	Stadium: Obolon Arena; Attendance: 2,993; Referee: Oleksandr Derdo

4 August 2019 2	Olimpik Donetsk	0–1	Kolos Kovalivka	Kyiv
17:00 EEST (UTC+03:00)	Fabinho (yellow card) 48'; Penkov (red card) 66'; Zaviyskyi (yellow card) 70'; Zahedi (yellow card) 85'; Abubakar (red card) 90+3'	Report	Smyrnyi (yellow card) 8' (yellow-red card) 43'; Zadoya (yellow card) 49'; Havrysh 68' (pen.)	Stadium: Dynamo Stadium; Attendance: 2,360; Referee: Dmytro Kryvushkin

11 August 2019 3	Kolos Kovalivka	1–3	Zorya Luhansk	Kyiv
17:00 EEST (UTC+03:00)	Zadoya (yellow card) 1'; Milko (yellow card) 26'; Kostyshyn 34'; Morozko (yellow card) 56'; Zozulya (yellow card) 80'	Report	Lyednyev 27', (yellow card) 90+2'; Rusyn 45+1'; Kabayev 46'	Stadium: Obolon Arena; Attendance: 4,420; Referee: Oleksandr Omelchenko

17 August 2019 4	Desna Chernihiv	0–0	Kolos Kovalivka	Chernihiv
17:00 EEST (UTC+03:00)	Denys Favorov (yellow card) 22'; Hitchenko (yellow card) 35'; Mostovyi (yellow card) 49'; Bohdanov (yellow card) 66'; Ohirya (yellow card) 86'	Report	Maksymenko (yellow card) 39'; Milko (yellow card) 55'	Stadium: Chernihiv Stadium; Attendance: 4,087; Referee: Andriy Kovalenko

24 August 2019 5	Kolos Kovalivka	0–3	Vorskla Poltava	Kyiv
14:00 EEST (UTC+03:00)	Nekhtiy (yellow card) 7'; Zozulya (yellow card) 35'; Smyrnyi (yellow card) 41'	Report	Perduta 4', 54'; Artur (yellow card) 70'; Kolomoyets 73'	Stadium: Obolon Arena; Attendance: 2,002; Referee: Kateryna Monzul

31 August 2019 6	SC Dnipro-1	2–1	Kolos Kovalivka	Dnipro
EEST (UTC+03:00)	Romanyuk (yellow card) 53'; Polyovyi (yellow card) 54'; Nazarenko 59'; Kohut 90+3', (yellow card) 90+3'	Report	Morozko 18'; Kostyshyn (yellow card) 39'; Orikhovskyi (yellow card) 56'; Zozulya (yellow card) 72'; Chornomorets (yellow card) 90+1'	Stadium: Dnipro-Arena; Attendance: 3,290; Referee: Yuriy Ivanov

15 September 2019 7	Kolos Kovalivka	1–0	FC Lviv	Kyiv
19:30 EEST (UTC+03:00)	Lysenko (yellow card) 33'; Milko (yellow card) 38'; Kostyshyn 87'	Report	Rafael Sabino (yellow card) 2'; Lyulka (yellow card) 44'; Alvaro (yellow card) 60'; Bratkov (yellow card) 85'	Stadium: Obolon Arena; Attendance: 3,250; Referee: Oleksandr Omelchenko

22 September 2019 8	Kolos Kovalivka	1–1	FC Oleksandriya	Kyiv
EEST (UTC+03:00)	Volkov (yellow card) 13'; Milko (yellow card) 39'; Kostyshyn 45' (pen.); Orikhovskyi (yellow card) 47'	Report	Stetskov (yellow card) 25'; Shendrik (yellow card) 45+4'; Babohlo 68'	Stadium: Obolon Arena; Attendance: 2,100; Referee: Dmytro Kryvushkin

28 September 2019 9	Karpaty Lviv	1–2	Kolos Kovalivka	Lviv
17:00 EEST (UTC+03:00)	Klyots (yellow card) 2'; João Diogo (yellow card) 27'; Nazaryna 28'; Vakulenko (yellow card) 71'	Report	Orikhovskyi (yellow card) 4'; Kostyshyn (yellow card) 6'; Smyrnyi 8'; Volkov 44'; Paramonov (yellow card) 67'; Kyzylatesh (yellow card) 73'; Chornomorets (yellow card) 74'; Nekhtiy (yellow card) 83'	Stadium: Ukraina Stadium; Attendance: 1,651; Referee: Ivan Bondar

6 October 2019 10	Kolos Kovalivka	0–4	Dynamo Kyiv	Kyiv
17:00 EEST (UTC+03:00)	Ilyin (yellow card) 53'; Maksymenko (red card) 54'; Orikhovskyi (yellow card) 62'; Milko (yellow card) 75'; Paramonov (yellow card) 87'	Report	Sydorchuk (yellow card) 19'; Shepelyev (yellow card) 45' (yellow-red card) 49'; Tsyhankov 56' (pen.); Besyedin 66', 81', (yellow card) 87'; Verbič (yellow card) 85', (goal) 90+5' (pen.)	Stadium: Obolon Arena; Attendance: 4,892; Referee: Andriy Kovalenko

18 October 2019 11	Shakhtar Donetsk	6–0	Kolos Kovalivka	Kharkiv
19:00 EEST (UTC+03:00)	Moraes 5', 61'; Konoplyanka 26'; Dodô 32'; Taison 43', 45'; Cipriano (yellow card) 62'; Bondar (yellow card) 64'; Marcos Antônio (yellow card) 70'	Report	Chornomorets (yellow card) 49'; Milko (yellow card) 57'	Stadium: OSC Metalist; Attendance: 4,549; Referee: Yaroslav Kozyk

26 October 2019 12	FC Mariupol	2–0	Kolos Kovalivka	Mariupol
14:00 EEST (UTC+03:00)	Kyryukhantsev 39'; Topalov 86'	Report	Orikhovskyi (yellow card) 58'; Maksymenko (yellow card) 78' (yellow-red card) 90'	Stadium: Volodymyr Boiko Stadium; Attendance: 3,150; Referee: Yuriy Mozharovskyi

3 November 2019 13	Kolos Kovalivka	1–2	Olimpik Donetsk	Kyiv
19:30 EET (UTC+02:00)	Paramonov (yellow card) 28'; Kostyshyn (yellow card) 41'; Ilyin (yellow card) 51'; Orikhovskyi 70'; Chornomorets (yellow card) 87'	Report	Yevhen Pasich 59'; Tsymbalyuk (yellow card) 69'; Balashov 88' (pen.); Chinedu (yellow card) 90+1'	Stadium: Obolon Arena; Attendance: 1,276; Referee: Ivan Bondar

10 November 2019 14	Zorya Luhansk	2–0	Kolos Kovalivka	Zaporizhia
14:00 EET (UTC+02:00)	Yurchenko 31' (pen.); Kabayev (yellow card) 61'; Kocherhin 90+1'	Report	Havrysh (yellow card) 30' (yellow-red card) 55'; Morozko (red card) 77'	Stadium: Slavutych-Arena; Attendance: 2,411; Referee: Yuriy Ivanov

24 November 2019 15	Kolos Kovalivka	2–0	Desna Chernihiv	Kyiv
14:00 EET (UTC+02:00)	Zadoya (yellow card) 4'; Paramonov (yellow card) 22'; Lysenko 29'; Vilhjálmsson 71'; Ilyin (yellow card) 76'	Report	Artem Favorov (yellow card) 34'; Imerekov (yellow card) 75'; Hitchenko (yellow card) 77'; Kalitvintsev (yellow card) 85'	Stadium: Obolon Arena; Attendance: 1,369; Referee: Oleksandr Derdo

30 November 2019 16	Vorskla Poltava	1–0	Kolos Kovalivka	Poltava
17:00 EET (UTC+02:00)	Artur (yellow card) 1'; Vasin 38' (pen.); Ndiaye (yellow card) 90+3'	Report	Zadoya (yellow card) 30'; Lysenko (yellow card) 90+3'	Stadium: Vorskla Stadium; Attendance: 1,156; Referee: Kostiantyn Trukhanov

7 December 2019 17	Kolos Kovalivka	4–0	SC Dnipro-1	Kyiv
17:00 EET (UTC+02:00)	Vilhjálmsson 14' (pen.), 52'; Volynets (yellow card) 49'; Ilyin 57'; Milko (yellow card) 60'; Smyrnyi (yellow card) 66', (goal) 78'	Report	Korkishko (yellow card) 19' (yellow-red card) 40'; Shapoval (yellow card) 74'; Vakulko (yellow card) 90'	Stadium: Obolon Arena; Attendance: 1,798; Referee: Maksym Kozyryatskyi

14 December 2019 18	FC Lviv	3–2	Kolos Kovalivka	Lviv
14:00 EET (UTC+02:00)	Renan 13'; Tatarkov 32' (pen.); Bohunov (yellow card) 38'; Alvaro (yellow card) 55', (goal) 73'; Lyulka (yellow card) 57'; Sarnavskyi (red card) 60'	Report	Ilyin (yellow card) 7'; Paramonov 29'; Mihunov (yellow card) 30'; Vilhjálmsson (yellow card) 59'; Zozulya (yellow card) 88'; Lysenko 90+4'	Stadium: Ukraina Stadium; Attendance: 740; Referee: Yaroslav Kozyk

23 February 2020 19	FC Oleksandriya	1–2	Kolos Kovalivka	Oleksandriya
14:00 EET (UTC+02:00)	Babohlo (yellow card) 31'; Dovhyi (yellow card) 53'; Sitalo 61', (yellow card) 77'	Report	Smyrnyi 46', 90+2', (yellow card) 90+2'; Petrov (yellow card) 64'; Bondarenko (yellow card) 76'; Volynets (yellow card) 76'	Stadium: CSC Nika Stadium; Attendance: 1,197; Referee: Yuriy Ivanov

29 February 2020 20	Kolos Kovalivka	2–1	Karpaty Lviv	Kyiv
EET (UTC+02:00)	Ilyin 11'; Yemets (yellow card) 25'; Petrov 42'; Smyrnyi (yellow card) 84'	Report	Boiciuc (yellow card) 45'; Giorgadze (yellow card) 47'; Pasich (yellow card) 65'; Prytula (yellow card) 77'; Kozak 78'; Nazaryna (yellow card) 90+3'	Stadium: Obolon Arena; Attendance: 2,780; Referee: Maksym Kozyryatskyi

3 March 2020 21	Dynamo Kyiv	2–0	Kolos Kovalivka	Kyiv
19:30 EET (UTC+02:00)	Shaparenko (yellow card) 11'; Shabanov (yellow card) 28'; Fran Sol 41', (yellow card) 44'; Tsyhankov 54'	Report	Petrov (yellow card) 22'; Yemets (yellow card) 32'; Zadoya (red card) 45+2'; Yefremov (yellow card) 62'	Stadium: NSC Olimpiyskiy; Attendance: 8,434; Referee: Vitaliy Romanov

8 March 2020 22	Kolos Kovalivka	3–4	Shakhtar Donetsk	Kyiv
17:00 EET (UTC+02:00)	Petrov (yellow card) 11'; Yemets (yellow card) 31'; Yefremov (yellow card) 33'; Milko 37', 76', (yellow card) 56'; Havrysh 67' (pen.)	Report	Taison 12' (pen.); Moraes 31', 81', (yellow card) 41'; Tetê (yellow card) 45+1', (goal) 60'; Kryvtsov (yellow card) 66'; Marcos Antônio (yellow card) 85' (yellow-red card) 90+5'; Ismaily (yellow card) 90+4'	Stadium: Obolon Arena; Attendance: 3,950; Referee: Yaroslav Kozyk

14 March 2020 23	FC Oleksandriya	4–2	Kolos Kovalivka	Oleksandriya
17:00 EET (UTC+02:00)	Bezborodko (yellow card) 6'; Hrechyshkin 45+1'; Hrytsuk 54' (pen.); Babohlo (yellow card) 61'; Kovalets 64'; Zaderaka 90'; Luchkevych (yellow card) 90+3'	Report	Orikhovskyi (yellow card) 3'; Vilhjálmsson (yellow card) 24'; Sorokin 35', (yellow card) 45'; Maksymenko (yellow card) 54'; Lysenko 80'; Yefremov (yellow card) 84'	Stadium: CSC Nika Stadium; Attendance: 0 Referee: Ihor Paskhal
Note: Match was played behind closed doors due to quarantine in Ukraine during COVID-19 pandemic.

30 May 2020 24	Kolos Kovalivka	0–2	Desna Chernihiv	Kyiv
14:00 EET (UTC+02:00)	Milko (yellow card) 63'; Petrov (yellow card) 73'; Yemets (yellow card) 78'	Report	Hutsulyak (yellow card) 8'; Imerekov (yellow card) 18'; Denys Favorov 64', (yellow card) 66'; Budkivskyi (yellow card) 69'; Kartushov 84'	Stadium: Obolon Arena; Attendance: 0 Referee: Yuriy Ivanov
Note: Match was played behind closed doors due to quarantine in Ukraine during COVID-19 pandemic.

6 June 2020 25	Zorya Luhansk	1–0	Kolos Kovalivka	Zaporizhia
17:00 EEST (UTC+03:00)	Kabayev 13'; Ivanisenya (yellow card) 28'; Lyednyev (yellow card) 75'; Cvek (yellow card) 83'	Report	Vilhjálmsson (yellow card) 15'; Havrysh (yellow card) 21'; Smyrnyi (yellow card) 45+1'; Kozhushko (yellow card) 50' (yellow-red card) 66'	Stadium: Slavutych-Arena; Attendance: 0 Referee: Anatoliy Abdula
Note: Match was played behind closed doors due to quarantine in Ukraine during COVID-19 pandemic.

14 June 2020 26	Kolos Kovalivka	0–1	Shakhtar Donetsk	Kyiv
17:00 EEST (UTC+03:00)	Ilyin (yellow card) 56'	Report	Moraes 49'; Patrick (yellow card) 84'	Stadium: NSC Olimpiyskiy; Attendance: 0 Referee: Viktor Kopievskyi
Note: Match was played behind closed doors due to quarantine in Ukraine during COVID-19 pandemic.

22 June 2020 27	Dynamo Kyiv	2–1	Kolos Kovalivka	Kyiv
19:30 EEST (UTC+03:00)	Tsitaishvili (yellow card) 19'; Popov (yellow card) 52'; Tsyhankov 64' (pen.); De Pena 87' (pen.)	Report	Milko (yellow card) 40'; Petrov (yellow card) 49' (yellow-red card) 62'; Yemets (yellow card) 61'; Vilhjálmsson 69' (pen.); Yefremov (yellow card) 86'	Stadium: NSC Olimpiyskiy; Attendance: 0 Referee: Serhiy Boyko
Note: Match was played behind closed doors due to quarantine in Ukraine during COVID-19 pandemic.

27 June 2020 28	Kolos Kovalivka	2–1	FC Oleksandriya	Kyiv
17:00 EEST (UTC+03:00)	Lysenko 20', 29'; Morozko (yellow card) 49'; Zozulya (yellow card) 79'; Bohdanov (yellow card) 89'	Report	Miroshnichenko (yellow card) 23'; Kovalets 47', (yellow card) 83'; Banada (yellow card) 77'; Tretyakov (yellow card) 82'	Stadium: Obolon Arena; Attendance: 0 Referee: Dmytro Bondarenko
Note: Match was played behind closed doors due to quarantine in Ukraine during COVID-19 pandemic.

5 July 2020 29	Desna Chernihiv	5–1	Kolos Kovalivka	Chernihiv
17:00 EEST (UTC+03:00)	Budkivskyi 9'; Denys Favorov (yellow card) 31', (goal) 37', 78' (pen.); Totovytskyi (yellow card) 85', (goal) 90+1'; Starenkyi 87'	Report	Morozko (yellow card) 21'; Bohdanov (yellow card) 43'; Zozulya (yellow card) 77'; Kozhushko 89'; Kostyshyn (yellow card) 89'	Stadium: Chernihiv Stadium; Attendance: 0 Referee: Ihor Paskhal
Note: Match was played behind closed doors due to quarantine in Ukraine during COVID-19 pandemic.

11 July 2020 30	Kolos Kovalivka	0–2	Zorya Luhansk	Kyiv
17:00 EEST (UTC+03:00)	Lysenko (yellow card) 44'; Bohdanov (yellow card) 62'; Chornomorets (yellow card) 73'	Report	Kocherhin 9', 45+1'; Lyednyev (yellow card) 54'; Khomchenovskyi (yellow card) 65'	Stadium: Obolon Arena; Attendance: 0 Referee: Maksym Kozyryatskyi
Note: Match was played behind closed doors due to quarantine in Ukraine during COVID-19 pandemic.

15 July 2020 31	Shakhtar Donetsk	2–0	Kolos Kovalivka	Kharkiv
19:00 EEST (UTC+03:00)	Cipriano 49'; Khocholava (yellow card) 70'; Moraes (yellow card) 81', (goal) 90+4'	Report	Antyukh (yellow card) 60'; Sorokin (yellow card) 78'	Stadium: OSC Metalist; Attendance: 0 Referee: Oleksandr Shandor
Note: Match was played behind closed doors due to quarantine in Ukraine during COVID-19 pandemic.

19 July 2020 32	Kolos Kovalivka	2–0	Dynamo Kyiv	Kyiv
19:30 EEST (UTC+03:00)	Chornomorets (yellow card) 30'; Lysenko 54'; Vilhjálmsson 71' (pen.); Milko (yellow card) 84' (yellow-red card) 90+4'	Report	Shepelyev (yellow card) 74'; Kędziora (yellow card) 82'	Stadium: NSC Olimpiyskiy; Attendance: 0 Referee: Maksym Kozyryatskyi
Note: Match was played behind closed doors due to quarantine in Ukraine during COVID-19 pandemic.

==== Play-off round ====
25 July 2020 Play-off	Kolos Kovalivka	4–1	SC Dnipro-1	Kyiv
17:00 EEST (UTC+03:00)	Morozko (yellow card) 15', (goal) 88'; Orikhovskyi 22'; Zadoya (yellow card) 23'; Antyukh 24', 50'; Maksymenko (yellow card) 35'; Smyrnyi (yellow card) 90+4'	Report	Tsurikov (yellow card) 6'; Di Franco (yellow card) 44'; Supriaha 48'	Stadium: NSC Olimpiyskiy; Attendance: 2,915; Referee: Kateryna Monzul

29 July 2020 Play-off final	Kolos Kovalivka	1–0	FC Mariupol	Kyiv
19:30 EEST (UTC+03:00)	Zadoya (yellow card) 11'; Bondarenko (yellow card) 74'; Antyukh 95'; Kostyshyn (yellow card) 113'	Report	Myshnyov (yellow card) 7'; Tyschenko (yellow card) 46'; Chobotenko (yellow card) 68'; Ihnatenko (yellow card) 84'; Chekh (yellow card) 101'	Stadium: NSC Olimpiyskiy; Attendance: 5,073; Referee: Yevhen Aranovskyi

=== Ukrainian Cup ===
30 October 2019 Round of 16 (1/8)	Kolos Kovalivka	0–1	Vorskla Poltava	Kyiv
17:00 EET (UTC+02:00)	Sakhnevych (yellow card) 27'; Volkov (yellow card) 54'	Report	Sapay (yellow card) 26'; Vasin (yellow card) 40'; Perduta (yellow card) 57'; Kozyrenko 68'; Kravchenko (yellow card) 90+4'	Stadium: Obolon Arena; Attendance: 628; Referee: Mykola Kozyryatskyi

== Statistics ==
=== Appearances and goals ===
No.	Pos	Nat	Player	Total		Premier League		Cup	
No.	Pos	Nat	Player	Apps	Goals	Apps	Goals	Apps	Goals
Goalkeepers
1	GK	(Ukraine) UKR	Anton Yashkov	8	0	8	0	0	0
25	GK	(Ukraine) UKR	Yevhen Volynets	26	0	25	0	1	0
71	GK	(Ukraine) UKR	Yevhen Kucherenko	1	0	1	0	0	0
Defenders
5	DF	(Ukraine) UKR	Kyrylo Petrov	11	1	9+2	1	0	0
6	DF	(Ukraine) UKR	Maksym Maksymenko	21	0	19+1	0	1	0
15	DF	(Ukraine) UKR	Oleksandr Chornomorets	19	0	16+3	0	0	0
24	DF	(Ukraine) UKR	Oleksiy Zozulya	20	0	19+1	0	0	0
67	DF	(Ukraine) UKR	Vadym Paramonov	23	1	17+5	1	1	0
80	DF	(Ukraine) UKR	Yevhen Yefremov	10	0	10	0	0	0
Midfielders
8	MF	(Ukraine) UKR	Yevhen Smyrnyi	25	5	21+4	5	0	0
9	MF	(Ukraine) UKR	Denys Antyukh	8	3	4+4	3	0	0
10	MF	(Ukraine) UKR	Yevhen Morozko	29	2	18+10	2	0+1	0
11	MF	(Ukraine) UKR	Oleh Kozhushko	23	1	4+18	1	0+1	0
13	MF	(Ukraine) UKR	Vitaliy Havrysh	20	3	20	3	0	0
14	MF	(Ukraine) UKR	Vadym Milko	29	2	25+3	2	1	0
18	MF	(Ukraine) UKR	Denys Kostyshyn	24	3	11+12	3	1	0
19	MF	(Ukraine) UKR	Stanislav Sorokin	4	1	1+2	1	0+1	0
29	MF	(Ukraine) UKR	Vladyslav Yemets	12	0	12	0	0	0
48	MF	(Ukraine) UKR	Pavlo Orikhovskyi	20	2	17+3	2	0	0
69	MF	(Ukraine) UKR	Oleh Ilyin	24	2	20+3	2	1	0
89	MF	(Ukraine) UKR	Oleksandr Volkov	11	1	8+2	1	1	0
90	MF	(Ukraine) UKR	Andriy Bohdanov	14	0	13+1	0	0	0
94	MF	(Senegal) SEN	Mamadou Danfa	1	0	0+1	0	0	0
99	MF	(Ukraine) UKR	Yevhen Zadoya	20	0	16+3	0	1	0
Forwards
7	FW	(Ukraine) UKR	Volodymyr Lysenko	28	6	20+7	6	1	0
17	FW	(Ukraine) UKR	Oleksandr Bondarenko	13	0	5+8	0	0	0
27	FW	(Ukraine) UKR	Kyrylo Senko	1	0	0+1	0	0	0
77	FW	(Iceland) ISL	Árni Vilhjálmsson	15	5	11+4	5	0	0
Players transferred out during the season
2	DF	(Ukraine) UKR	Andriy Sakhnevych	6	0	5	0	1	0
5	MF	(Ukraine) UKR	Oleksandr Pozdeyev	1	0	1	0	0	0
9	MF	(Ukraine) UKR	Yehor Demchenko	2	0	0+2	0	0	0
21	MF	(Ukraine) UKR	Vyacheslav Ryabov	6	0	2+4	0	0	0
23	MF	(Ukraine) UKR	Dzhemal Kyzylatesh	6	0	1+5	0	0	0
26	DF	(Ukraine) UKR	Oleksandr Mihunov	7	0	6	0	1	0
33	FW	(Ukraine) UKR	Vladyslav Nekhtiy	14	0	11+3	0	0	0

Source: Competitions

Last updated: 29 July 2020

=== Goalscorers ===
Rank	No.	Pos	Nat	Name	Premier League	Cup	Total
1	7	FW	(Ukraine)	Volodymyr Lysenko	6	0	6
2	8	MF	(Ukraine)	Yevhen Smyrnyi	5	0	5
2	77	FW	(Iceland)	Árni Vilhjálmsson	5	0	5
4	9	MF	(Ukraine)	Denys Antyukh	3	0	3
4	13	MF	(Ukraine)	Vitaliy Havrysh	3	0	3
4	18	MF	(Ukraine)	Denys Kostyshyn	3	0	3
7	10	MF	(Ukraine)	Yevhen Morozko	2	0	2
7	14	MF	(Ukraine)	Vadym Milko	2	0	2
7	48	MF	(Ukraine)	Pavlo Orikhovskyi	2	0	2
7	69	MF	(Ukraine)	Oleh Ilyin	2	0	2
11	5	DF	(Ukraine)	Kyrylo Petrov	1	0	1
11	11	MF	(Ukraine)	Oleh Kozhushko	1	0	1
11	19	MF	(Ukraine)	Stanislav Sorokin	1	0	1
11	67	DF	(Ukraine)	Vadym Paramonov	1	0	1
11	89	MF	(Ukraine)	Oleksandr Volkov	1	0	1
				Total	38	0	38

Last updated: 29 July 2020

=== Clean sheets ===
Rank	No.	Pos	Nat	Name	Premier League	Cup	Total
1	25	GK	(Ukraine)	Yevhen Volynets	5	0	5
2	1	GK	(Ukraine)	Anton Yashkov	2	0	2
				Total	7	0	7

Last updated: 29 July 2020

=== Disciplinary record ===
No.	Pos	Nat	Player	Premier League			Cup			Total		
No.	Pos	Nat	Player	Booked	(yellow card) (yellow-red card)	Sent off (straight red)	Booked	(yellow card) (yellow-red card)	Sent off (straight red)	Booked	(yellow card) (yellow-red card)	Sent off (straight red)
2	DF	(Ukraine)	Andriy Sakhnevych	0	0	0	1	0	0	1	0	0
5	DF	(Ukraine)	Kyrylo Petrov	4	1	0	0	0	0	4	1	0
6	DF	(Ukraine)	Maksym Maksymenko	2	2	1	0	0	0	2	2	1
7	FW	(Ukraine)	Volodymyr Lysenko	3	0	0	0	0	0	3	0	0
8	MF	(Ukraine)	Yevhen Smyrnyi	7	1	0	0	0	0	7	1	0
9	MF	(Ukraine)	Denys Antyukh	1	0	0	0	0	0	1	0	0
10	MF	(Ukraine)	Yevhen Morozko	4	0	1	0	0	0	4	0	1
11	MF	(Ukraine)	Oleh Kozhushko	0	1	0	0	0	0	0	1	0
13	MF	(Ukraine)	Vitaliy Havrysh	1	1	0	0	0	0	1	1	0
14	MF	(Ukraine)	Vadym Milko	10	1	0	0	0	0	10	1	0
15	DF	(Ukraine)	Oleksandr Chornomorets	6	0	0	0	0	0	6	0	0
17	FW	(Ukraine)	Oleksandr Bondarenko	2	0	0	0	0	0	2	0	0
18	MF	(Ukraine)	Denys Kostyshyn	5	0	0	0	0	0	5	0	0
19	MF	(Ukraine)	Stanislav Sorokin	2	0	0	0	0	0	2	0	0
23	MF	(Ukraine)	Dzhemal Kyzylatesh	1	0	0	0	0	0	1	0	0
24	DF	(Ukraine)	Oleksiy Zozulya	4	0	0	0	0	0	4	0	0
25	GK	(Ukraine)	Yevhen Volynets	2	0	0	0	0	0	2	0	0
26	DF	(Ukraine)	Oleksandr Mihunov	1	0	0	0	0	0	1	0	0
29	MF	(Ukraine)	Vladyslav Yemets	5	0	0	0	0	0	5	0	0
33	DF	(Ukraine)	Vladyslav Nekhtiy	2	0	0	0	0	0	2	0	0
48	MF	(Ukraine)	Pavlo Orikhovskyi	6	0	0	0	0	0	6	0	0
67	DF	(Ukraine)	Vadym Paramonov	4	0	0	0	0	0	4	0	0
69	MF	(Ukraine)	Oleh Ilyin	6	0	0	0	0	0	6	0	0
77	FW	(Iceland)	Árni Vilhjálmsson	3	0	0	0	0	0	3	0	0
80	DF	(Ukraine)	Yevhen Yefremov	4	0	0	0	0	0	4	0	0
89	MF	(Ukraine)	Oleksandr Volkov	1	0	0	1	0	0	2	0	0
90	MF	(Ukraine)	Andriy Bohdanov	3	0	0	0	0	0	3	0	0
99	MF	(Ukraine)	Yevhen Zadoya	6	0	1	0	0	0	6	0	1
			Total	95	7	3	2	0	0	97	7	3

Last updated: 29 July 2020

=== Attendances ===
	Matches	Attendances	Average	High	Low
Premier League	18	38,818	2,156	5,073	0
Cup	1	628	628	628	628
Total	19	39,446	1,392	5,073	0

Last updated: 29 July 2020
