= 2019–20 FC Desna Chernihiv season =

FC Desna Chernihiv
2019–20 season
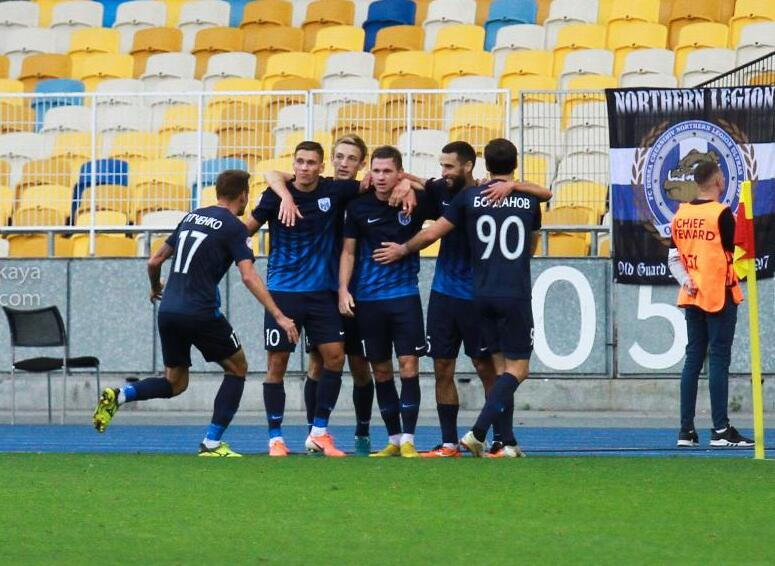
- President: Volodymyr Levin
- Manager: Oleksandr Ryabokon
- Stadium: Chernihiv Stadium
- Ukrainian Premier League: 4th
- Ukrainian Cup: Quarter-finals
- Top goalscorer: League: Oleksandr Filippov (16); All: Oleksandr Filippov (18)
- Highest home attendance: 5,500 (vs Shakhtar Donetsk, 22 September 2019)
- Lowest home attendance: 0 (all home matches were played behind closed doors starting 21 June 2020)
- Average home league attendance: 2,695
Home colours	Away colours

The 2019–20 season was the second season for FC Desna Chernihiv in the Ukrainian Premier League. Desna also competed in the Ukrainian Cup.

== Players ==
=== Squad information ===
As of 19 July 2020

Squad no.	Name	Nationality	Position	Date of birth (age)
Goalkeepers
35	Maksym Tatarenko ^{List B}	(Ukraine)	GK	7 May 1999 (aged 21)
44	Yevhen Past	(Ukraine)	GK	16 March 1988 (aged 32)
72	Ihor Lytovka	(Ukraine)	GK	5 June 1988 (aged 32)
Defenders
4	Joonas Tamm	(Estonia)	DF	2 February 1992 (aged 28)
5	Vitaliy Yermakov	(Ukraine)	DF	7 June 1992 (aged 28)
17	Andriy Hitchenko	(Ukraine)	DF	2 October 1984 (aged 35)
22	Andriy Mostovyi	(Ukraine)	DF	24 January 1988 (aged 32)
26	Yukhym Konoplya ^{List B} (on loan from Shakhtar Donetsk)	(Ukraine)	DF	26 August 1999 (aged 20)
32	Maksym Imerekov	(Ukraine)	DF	23 January 1991 (aged 29)
43	Artur Zapadnya	(Ukraine)	DF	4 June 1990 (aged 30)
45	Denys Favorov (Captain)	(Ukraine)	DF	1 April 1991 (aged 29)
Midfielders
7	Vladyslav Ohirya	(Ukraine)	MF	3 April 1990 (aged 30)
8	Andriy Dombrovskyi	(Ukraine)	MF	12 August 1995 (aged 24)
9	Levan Arveladze	(Ukraine) (Georgia (country))	MF	6 April 1993 (aged 27)
11	Vladyslav Kalitvintsev	(Ukraine)	MF	4 January 1993 (aged 27)
12	Yehor Kartushov	(Ukraine)	MF	5 January 1991 (aged 29)
14	Andriy Yakymiv ^{List B}	(Ukraine)	MF	15 June 1997 (aged 23)
16	Yevheniy Belych ^{List B}	(Ukraine)	MF	9 January 2001 (aged 19)
20	Andriy Totovytskyi	(Ukraine)	MF	20 January 1993 (aged 27)
25	Oleksiy Hutsulyak	(Ukraine)	MF	25 December 1997 (aged 22)
27	Serhiy Starenkyi	(Ukraine)	MF	20 September 1984 (aged 35)
77	Orest Kuzyk	(Ukraine)	MF	17 May 1995 (aged 25)
Forwards
10	Oleksandr Filippov	(Ukraine)	FW	23 October 1992 (aged 27)
13	Dmytro Khlyobas	(Ukraine)	FW	9 May 1994 (aged 26)
28	Pylyp Budkivskyi	(Ukraine)	FW	10 March 1992 (aged 28)

== Transfers ==
=== In ===
Date	Pos.	Player	Age	Moving from	Type	Fee	Source
Summer
6 June 2019	MF	(Ukraine) Vladyslav Kalitvintsev	26	(Ukraine) Arsenal Kyiv	Transfer	Free	
8 June 2019	DF	(Ukraine) Vitaliy Pryndeta	26	(Russia) SKA-Khabarovsk	Transfer	Free	
27 June 2019	DF	(Ukraine) Artur Zapadnya	29	(Ukraine) Volyn Lutsk	Transfer	Free	
15 July 2019	MF	(Ukraine) Orest Kuzyk	24	(Greece) PAS Giannina	Transfer	Undisclosed	
25 July 2019	DF	(Ukraine) Andriy Dombrovskyi	23	(Ukraine) Arsenal Kyiv	Transfer	Undisclosed	
28 July 2019	FW	(Ukraine) Illya Shevtsov	19	(Ukraine) Shakhtar Donetsk	Transfer	Undisclosed	
1 June 2019	GK	(Ukraine) Kostyantyn Makhnovskyi	30	(Ukraine) Olimpik Donetsk	Loan return		
1 June 2019	DF	(Ukraine) Vitaliy Yermakov	27	(Ukraine) Avanhard Kramatorsk	Loan return		
1 June 2019	MF	(Ukraine) Maksym Banasevych	24	(Ukraine) Kolos Kovalivka	Loan return		
9 September 2019	FW	(Ukraine) Ihor Kirienko	33	(Ukraine) Avanhard Kramatorsk	Loan return		
28 June 2019	DF	(Ukraine) Yukhym Konoplya	19	(Ukraine) Shakhtar Donetsk	Loan		
18 July 2019	FW	(Ukraine) Maksym Dehtyarov	26	(Ukraine) Olimpik Donetsk	Loan		
Winter
3 January 2020	MF	(Ukraine) Levan Arveladze	26	(Ukraine) Zorya Luhansk	Transfer	Undisclosed	
6 January 2020	FW	(Ukraine) Pylyp Budkivskyi	27	(Ukraine) Zorya Luhansk	Transfer	Undisclosed	
21 January 2020	FW	(Ukraine) Oleksiy Hutsulyak	22	(Ukraine) Karpaty Lviv	Transfer	Undisclosed	
22 January 2020	MF	(Ukraine) Andriy Totovytskyi	27	(Ukraine) Shakhtar Donetsk	Transfer	Undisclosed	
24 January 2020	DF	(Estonia) Joonas Tamm	27	(Estonia) Flora Tallinn	Transfer	Undisclosed	

=== Out ===
Date	Pos.	Player	Age	Moving to	Type	Fee	Source
Summer
6 June 2019	DF	(Ukraine) Temur Partsvania	28	Unattached	Transfer	Free	
17 June 2019	FW	(Ukraine) Mykhaylo Serhiychuk	27	(Latvia) Ventspils	Transfer	Free	
17 June 2019	GK	(Ukraine) Kostyantyn Makhnovskyi	30	(Latvia) Ventspils	Transfer	Free	
20 July 2019	MF	(Ukraine) Mykhaylo Kozak	28	(Georgia (country)) Shevardeni-1906 Tbilisi	Transfer	Free	
24 July 2019	DF	(Ukraine) Dmytro Nyemchaninov	29	(Ukraine) Rukh Lviv	Transfer	Free	
25 July 2019	DF	(Ukraine) Andriy Slinkin	28	(Ukraine) MFC Mykolaiv	Transfer	Free	
31 July 2019	MF	(Ukraine) Andriy Yakymiv	22	(Hungary) Kaposvári Rákóczi	Transfer	Free	
10 August 2019	DF	(Ukraine) Maksym Banasevych	24	(Ukraine) Rukh Lviv	Transfer	Free	
12 September 2019	DF	(Ukraine) Serhiy Lyulka	29	(Ukraine) FC Lviv	Transfer	Free	
1 June 2019	FW	(Ukraine) Denys Bezborodko	28	(Ukraine) Shakhtar Donetsk	Loan return		
22 July 2019	MF	(Ukraine) Vadym Bovtruk	27	(Ukraine) Dinaz Vyshhorod	Loan		
22 August 2019	MF	(Ukraine) Oleksandr Volkov	30	(Ukraine) Kolos Kovalivka	Loan		
Winter
3 January 2020	MF	(Ukraine) Artem Favorov	25	(Hungary) Puskás Akadémia	Transfer	470k euro	
16 January 2020	MF	(Ukraine) Andriy Bohdanov	29	(Ukraine) Kolos Kovalivka	Transfer	Free	
27 January 2020	MF	(Ukraine) Vitaliy Pryndeta	27	(Ukraine) Volyn Lutsk	Transfer	Undisclosed	
8 March 2020	MF	(Ukraine) Renat Mochulyak	22	(Moldova) Sfântul Gheorghe Suruceni	Transfer / Loan ?	Undisclosed	
1 January 2020	FW	(Ukraine) Maksym Dehtyarov	26	(Ukraine) Olimpik Donetsk	Loan return		

== Pre-season and friendlies ==
25 June 2019 Friendly	Desna Chernihiv (Ukraine)	0–1	Ukraine SFT
EEST (UTC+03:00)		Report	Nechyporenko 72'

26 June 2019 Friendly	Desna Chernihiv (Ukraine)	2–0	(Ukraine) Cherkashchyna-Akademiya
EEST (UTC+03:00)	Filippov 54', 76'	Report

1 July 2019 Friendly	Desna Chernihiv (Ukraine)	0–0	Ararat-Armenia	Belarus
EEST (UTC+03:00)		Report

2 July 2019 Friendly	Energetik-BGU Minsk (Belarus)	2–3	(Ukraine) Desna Chernihiv	Belarus
EEST (UTC+03:00)		Report	Denys Favorov 56', 81'; Filippov 75'

5 July 2019 Friendly	Desna Chernihiv (Ukraine)	1–0	(Ukraine) Obolon-Brovar Kyiv
EEST (UTC+03:00)	Khlyobas 59'	Report

12 July 2019 Friendly	Desna Chernihiv (Ukraine)	16–0	(Moldova) FC Ungheni	Tiraspol, Moldova
EEST (UTC+03:00)	Khlyobas, Kiriyenko, Filippov, Banasevych; Belych; Konoplya; Kartushov; Favorov; Bohdanov; Mostovyi; Volkov; Hitchenko			Stadium: Sheriff training facility

15 July 2019 Friendly	Chornomorets Odesa (Ukraine)	0–0	(Ukraine) Desna Chernihiv	Odesa
EEST (UTC+03:00)		Report

16 July 2019 Friendly	Desna Chernihiv (Ukraine)	1–0	(Ukraine) Balkany Zorya
EEST (UTC+03:00)	Khlyobas 58'	Report

19 July 2019 Friendly	Desna Chernihiv (Ukraine)	2–0	(Moldova) Dinamo-Auto Tiraspol	Tiraspol, Moldova
EEST (UTC+03:00)	Artem Favorov 30'; Filippov 75'	Report		Stadium: Sheriff training facility

20 July 2019 Friendly	Sfântul Gheorghe Suruceni (Moldova)	1–2	(Ukraine) Desna Chernihiv	Moldova
EEST (UTC+03:00)	Goal	Report	Kartushov 25'; Denys Favorov 70'

8 September 2019 Friendly	Ankaragücü (Turkey)	0–3	(Ukraine) Desna Chernihiv	Turkey
EEST (UTC+03:00)		Report	Bohdanov 19'; Kalitvintsev 61'; Khlyobas 85'

12 October 2019 Friendly	Antalyaspor (Turkey)	2–1	(Ukraine) Desna Chernihiv	Turkey
EEST (UTC+03:00)	Öztürk 13'; Özkan 65' (pen.)	Report	Khlyobas 25'

13 October 2019 Friendly	Alanyaspor (Turkey)	2–2	(Ukraine) Desna Chernihiv	Turkey
EEST (UTC+03:00)	Cissé 24', 29'	Report	Starenkyi 7'; Bohdanov 49'

16 November 2019 Friendly	Dinamo Minsk (Belarus)	2–2	(Ukraine) Desna Chernihiv	Belarus
EET (UTC+02:00)	Goal	Report	Kalitvintsev; Filippov

17 January 2020 Friendly	Sputnik Rechitsa (Belarus)	0–5	(Ukraine) Desna Chernihiv	Belarus
EET (UTC+02:00)		Report	Budkivskyi; Filippov; Kuzyk; Demyanenko; Starenkyi

24 January 2020 Friendly	Desna Chernihiv (Ukraine)	2–1	(Azerbaijan) Neftçi Baku	Turkey
EET (UTC+02:00)	Mahmudov 39' (o.g.); Kalitvintsev 45'	Report	Goal

28 January 2020 Friendly	TSV Hartberg (Austria)	1–1	(Ukraine) Desna Chernihiv	Turkey
EET (UTC+02:00)	Goal	Report	Filippov 57'

2 February 2020 Friendly	Sarajevo (Bosnia and Herzegovina)	0–0	(Ukraine) Desna Chernihiv	Turkey
EET (UTC+02:00)		Report

4 February 2020 Friendly	Desna Chernihiv (Ukraine)	1–2	(Czech Republic) Slovan Liberec	Turkey
EET (UTC+02:00)	Kalitvintsev 7'	Report	Rondić 17', 37'

13 February 2020 Friendly	Desna Chernihiv (Ukraine)	3–2	(China) Zhejiang Greentown	Turkey
10:00 EET (UTC+02:00)	Yermakov 44', 89'; Budkivskyi 79' (pen.)	Report	Goal

13 February 2020 Friendly	Desna Chernihiv (Ukraine)	1–0	(Latvia) Valmiera	Turkey
17:30 EET (UTC+02:00)	Hutsulyak 61'	Report

16 February 2020 Friendly	Desna Chernihiv (Ukraine)	2–0	(Denmark) Viborg	Turkey
EET (UTC+02:00)	Kalitvintsev 44'; Filippov 72'	Report

24 May 2020 Friendly	Obolon-Brovar Kyiv (Ukraine)	1–4	(Ukraine) Desna Chernihiv	Bucha
17:00 EEST (UTC+03:00)	Guttiner	Report	Budkivskyi; Shevtsov; Filippov	Stadium: Obolon-Brovar training facility Referee: Denys Shurman

25 May 2020 Friendly	Desna Chernihiv (Ukraine)	4–0	(Ukraine) FC Cherkashchyna	Chernihiv
14:00 EEST (UTC+03:00)	Denys Favorov; Budkivskyi; Shevtsov	Report		Stadium: Chernihiv Stadium

== Competitions ==
=== Overall ===
Competition	First match	Last match	Starting round	Final position	Record							
Competition	First match	Last match	Starting round	Final position	Pld	W	D	L	GF	GA	GD	Win %
Premier League	30 July 2019	19 July 2020	Matchday 1	4th	32	17	5	10	59	33	+26	53.13
Cup	30 October 2019	12 March 2020	Round of 16 (1/8)	Quarterfinal	2	1	0	1	4	3	+1	50.00
Total					34	18	5	11	63	36	+27	52.94

Last updated: 19 July 2020
Source: Competitions

=== Premier League ===
==== League table ====
Pos	Team	Pld	W	D	L	GF	GA	GD	Pts	Qualification or relegation
2	Dynamo Kyiv	32	18	5	9	65	35	+30	59	Qualification for the Champions League third qualifying round
3	Zorya Luhansk	32	17	7	8	50	29	+21	58	Qualification for the Europa League group stage
4	Desna Chernihiv	32	17	5	10	59	33	+26	56	Qualification for the Europa League third qualifying round
5	FC Oleksandriya	32	14	7	11	49	47	+2	49	Qualification for the playoff for Europa League second qualifying round
6	Kolos Kovalivka (O)	32	10	2	20	33	59	−26	32	Qualification for the playoff for Europa League second qualifying round

Source: Ukrainian Premier League, UEFA, Soccerway
Rules for classification: 1) Points; 2) Head-to-head points; 3) Head-to-head goal difference; 4) Head-to-head higher number of goals scored; 5) Goal difference; 6) Higher number of goals scored; 7) Draw or "golden match" if tied for title (Article 22, paragraph 3).
(O) Play-off winners

==== Results summary ====
Overall								Home						Away					
Pld	W	D	L	GF	GA	GD	Pts	W	D	L	GF	GA	GD	W	D	L	GF	GA	GD
32	17	5	10	59	33	+26	56	7	3	6	24	17	+7	10	2	4	35	16	+19

Last updated: 19 July 2020.
Source: Competitive matches

==== Results by round ====
Round	1	2	3	4	5	6	7	8	9	10	11	12	13	14	15	16	17	18	19	20	21	22	23	24	25	26	27	28	29	30	31	32
Ground	H	H	A	H	A	H	A	H	A	H	A	A	A	H	A	H	A	H	A	H	A	H	A	A	A	A	H	H	H	H	H	A
Result	L	W	W	D	W	D	W	L	W	W	L	W	W	D	L	W	W	L	L	W	W	W	D	W	L	W	L	W	W	L	L	D
Position	7	8	4	3	2	2	2	2	2	2	3	3	3	3	4	4	3	4	4	4	4	4	4	3	4	3	4	4	2	4	4	4

Updated to match(es) played on 19 July 2020. Source: Competitive matches
A = Away; H = Home; W = Win; D = Draw; L = Loss

==== Matches ====
30 July 2019 1	Desna Chernihiv	1–2	FC Lviv	Chernihiv
19:00 EEST (UTC+03:00)	Denys Favorov 30'; Filippov (yellow card) 42'; Hitchenko (yellow card) 88'	Report	Kvasnyi (yellow card) 8'; Pryimak (yellow card) 25'; Pernambuco 53'; Alvaro 85', (yellow card) 85'; Adamyuk (yellow card) 90'; Marthã (yellow card) 90+1'	Stadium: Chernihiv Stadium; Attendance: 4,037; Referee: Denys Shurman

3 August 2019 2	Desna Chernihiv	2–0	Vorskla Poltava	Chernihiv
19:30 EEST (UTC+03:00)	Kalitvintsev 19'; Mostovyi (yellow card) 22'; Ohirya (yellow card) 53'; Filippov 79'; Past (yellow card) 85'	Report	Šehić (yellow card) 31'; Perduta (yellow card) 39'; Vasin (yellow card) 90+2'; Martynenko (yellow card) 90+4'	Stadium: Chernihiv Stadium; Attendance: 3,288; Referee: Yuriy Ivanov

11 August 2019 3	SC Dnipro-1	0–1	Desna Chernihiv	Dnipro
17:00 EEST (UTC+03:00)	Safronov (yellow card) 46'; Korkishko (yellow card) 57'; Vakulko (yellow card) 60'; Kohut (yellow card) 81'	Report	Kalitvintsev (yellow card) 24'; Dehtyarov (yellow card) 44'; Filippov 67'	Stadium: Dnipro-Arena; Attendance: 6,097; Referee: Dmytro Bondarenko

17 August 2019 4	Desna Chernihiv	0–0	Kolos Kovalivka	Chernihiv
17:00 EEST (UTC+03:00)	Denys Favorov (yellow card) 22'; Hitchenko (yellow card) 35'; Mostovyi (yellow card) 49'; Bohdanov (yellow card) 66'; Ohirya (yellow card) 86'	Report	Maksymenko (yellow card) 39'; Milko (yellow card) 55'	Stadium: Chernihiv Stadium; Attendance: 4,087; Referee: Andriy Kovalenko

24 August 2019 5	FC Oleksandriya	0–3	Desna Chernihiv	Oleksandriya
17:00 EEST (UTC+03:00)	Miroshnichenko (yellow card) 16' (yellow-red card) 48'; Luchkevych (yellow card) 30'; Banada (yellow card) 42'; Shastal (yellow card) 89'	Report	Denys Favorov (yellow card) 33', (goal) 50' (pen.); Bohdanov (yellow card) 45+1'; Kuzyk 69'; Imerekov (yellow card) 83'; Filippov 90'	Stadium: CSC Nika Stadium; Attendance: 1,612; Referee: Ivan Bondar

30 August 2019 6	Desna Chernihiv	0–0	Karpaty Lviv	Chernihiv
19:00 EEST (UTC+03:00)	Bohdanov (yellow card) 14'; Denys Favorov (yellow card) 54'; Hitchenko (yellow card) 59'	Report	Kovtun (yellow card) 37'; Dubinchak (yellow card) 38' da Graça (yellow card) 57'; Kozak (yellow card) 90+4'	Stadium: Chernihiv Stadium; Attendance: 4,463; Referee: Volodymyr Novokhatniy

15 September 2019 7	Dynamo Kyiv	1–2	Desna Chernihiv	Kyiv
17:00 EEST (UTC+03:00)	de Pena (yellow card) 45+2'; Besyedin 49'	Report	Kalitvintsev 40'; Filippov 56'; Ohirya (yellow card) 75'; Past (yellow card) 90+4'	Stadium: NSC Olimpiyskiy; Attendance: 15,452; Referee: Viktor Kopiyevskyi

22 September 2019 8	Desna Chernihiv	0–1	Shakhtar Donetsk	Chernihiv
14:00 EEST (UTC+03:00)	Bohdanov (yellow card) 88'	Report	Marlos 22'; Taison (yellow card) 53'; Moraes (yellow card) 64'; Bolbat (yellow card) 90'	Stadium: Chernihiv Stadium; Attendance: 5,500; Referee: Kateryna Monzul

29 September 2019 9	FC Mariupol	0–4	Desna Chernihiv	Mariupol
14:00 EEST (UTC+03:00)		Report	Khlyobas 20', 67'; Filippov 21', 81'	Stadium: Volodymyr Boiko Stadium; Attendance: 4,072; Referee: Yaroslav Kozyk

5 October 2019 10	Desna Chernihiv	1–0	Olimpik Donetsk	Chernihiv
17:00 EEST (UTC+03:00)	Khlyobas (yellow card) 35'; Mostovyi (yellow card) 37'; Artem Favorov 90', (yellow card) 90+1'	Report	Hennadiy Pasich (yellow card) 52'; Zaviyskyi (red card) 65'	Stadium: Chernihiv Stadium; Attendance: 3,682; Referee: Yuriy Mozharovskyi

19 October 2019 11	Zorya Luhansk	2–1	Desna Chernihiv	Zaporizhia
17:00 EEST (UTC+03:00)	Kabayev (yellow card) 23'; Vernydub (yellow card) 50'; Lyednyev 80'; Yurchenko 85' (pen.)	Report	Artem Favorov (yellow card) 13'; Dehtyarov 17'; Kalitvintsev (yellow card) 84'	Stadium: Slavutych-Arena; Attendance: 2,375; Referee: Oleksandr Omelchenko

27 October 2019 12	FC Lviv	1–4	Desna Chernihiv	Lviv
14:00 EET (UTC+02:00)	Alvaro (yellow card) 38'; Renan (yellow card) 57' (yellow-red card) 80'; Pernambuco 61'; Bohunov (yellow card) 65'	Report	Denys Favorov 2' (pen.); Khlyobas 9', 46'; Konoplya (yellow card) 20'; Dehtyarov 41'; Kartushov (yellow card) 83'	Stadium: Ukraina Stadium; Attendance: 712; Referee: Yaroslav Kozyk

2 November 2019 13	Vorskla Poltava	0–1	Desna Chernihiv	Poltava
14:00 EET (UTC+02:00)	Petrović (yellow card) 41'; Chesnakov (yellow card) 63'	Report	Dehtyarov (yellow card) 68'; Imerekov 76'	Stadium: Vorskla Stadium; Attendance: 2,005; Referee: Dmytro Kutakov

9 November 2019 14	Desna Chernihiv	1–1	SC Dnipro-1	Chernihiv
14:00 EET (UTC+02:00)	Khlyobas 48'; Mostovyi (yellow card) 61'	Report	Shapoval 45+2', (yellow card) 90+2'; Gueye (yellow card) 53'; Zahalskyi (yellow card) 66'; Polyovyi (yellow card) 79'	Stadium: Chernihiv Stadium; Attendance: 2,745; Referee: Viktor Kopiyevskyi

24 November 2019 15	Kolos Kovalivka	2–0	Desna Chernihiv	Kyiv
14:00 EET (UTC+02:00)	Zadoya (yellow card) 4'; Paramonov (yellow card) 22'; Lysenko 29'; Vilhjálmsson 71'; Ilyin (yellow card) 76'	Report	Artem Favorov (yellow card) 34'; Imerekov (yellow card) 75'; Hitchenko (yellow card) 77'; Kalitvintsev (yellow card) 85'	Stadium: Obolon Arena; Attendance: 1,369; Referee: Oleksandr Derdo

1 December 2019 16	Desna Chernihiv	2–0	FC Oleksandriya	Chernihiv
14:00 EET (UTC+02:00)	Filippov (yellow card) 27', (goal) 60'; Khlyobas 46'	Report	Banada (yellow card) 12'; Stetskov (yellow card) 63'	Stadium: Chernihiv Stadium; Attendance: 2,081; Referee: Yevhen Aranovskyi

8 December 2019 17	Karpaty Lviv	2–6	Desna Chernihiv	Lviv
14:00 EET (UTC+02:00)	da Graça (yellow card) 15'; Nazaryna 17' (pen.); Kudryk (red card) 57'; Boiciuc 64'; Dubinchak (yellow card) 74'; Veremiyenko (yellow card) 85'	Report	Imerekov 3'; Filippov 16' (pen.), 89'; Artem Favorov (yellow card) 37'; Kalitvintsev 51', 80'; Khlyobas 77'	Stadium: Ukraina Stadium; Attendance: 923; Referee: Denys Shurman

15 December 2019 18	Desna Chernihiv	0–1	Dynamo Kyiv	Chernihiv
14:00 EET (UTC+02:00)	Ohirya (yellow card) 9'; Kalitvintsev (yellow card) 42'; Konoplya (yellow card) 90+5'	Report	Tsyhankov 25'; Buyalskyi (yellow card) 81'; Bushchan (yellow card) 90+2'	Stadium: Chernihiv Stadium; Attendance: 5,243; Referee: Viktor Kopiyevskyi

23 February 2020 19	Shakhtar Donetsk	1–0	Desna Chernihiv	Kharkiv
17:00 EET (UTC+02:00)	Marlos 90+5'	Report	Kartushov (yellow card) 18'; Totovytskyi (yellow card) 52'; Dombrovskyi (yellow card) 90'; Mostovyi (yellow card) 90+6'	Stadium: OSC Metalist; Attendance: 3,469; Referee: Yevhen Aranovskyi

29 February 2020 20	Desna Chernihiv	4–0	FC Mariupol	Chernihiv
14:00 EET (UTC+02:00)	Totovytskyi 11', 20'; Filippov 58' (pen.); Kalitvintsev 90+2'	Report	Chobotenko (yellow card) 5'; Dawa (yellow card) 20'; Ihnatenko (yellow card) 52'; Muravskyi (yellow card) 57'	Stadium: Chernihiv Stadium; Attendance: 3,417; Referee: Andriy Kovalenko

4 March 2020 21	Olimpik Donetsk	1–2	Desna Chernihiv	Kyiv
17:00 EET (UTC+02:00)	Dehtyarov 4', (yellow card) 40'; Kravchenko (yellow card) 33'; Lytvyn (yellow card) 50'	Report	Filippov 6', (yellow card) 10'; Tamm (yellow card) 70'; Arveladze 76'; Budkivskyi (yellow card) 84'; Past (yellow card) 90+3'	Stadium: Dynamo Stadium; Attendance: 320; Referee: Viktor Kopiyevskyi

7 March 2020 22	Desna Chernihiv	1–0	Zorya Luhansk	Chernihiv
14:00 EET (UTC+02:00)	Hutsulyak (red card) 20'; Filippov 37'; Budkivskyi (yellow card) 49'; Denys Favorov (yellow card) 69'	Report	Lunyov (red card) 45+3'; Mykhaylychenko (yellow card) 88'; Cigaņiks (yellow card) 90+3'	Stadium: Chernihiv Stadium; Attendance: 4,573; Referee: Kateryna Monzul

15 March 2020 23	Dynamo Kyiv	1–1	Desna Chernihiv	Kyiv
17:00 EET (UTC+02:00)	Rusyn (yellow card) 23', (goal) 69'	Report	Starenkyi (yellow card) 48'; Filippov 80'	Stadium: NSC Olimpiyskiy; Attendance: 0 Referee: Serhiy Boyko
Note: Match was played behind closed doors due to quarantine in Ukraine during COVID-19 pandemic.

30 May 2020 24	Kolos Kovalivka	0–2	Desna Chernihiv	Kyiv
14:00 EET (UTC+02:00)	Milko (yellow card) 63'; Petrov (yellow card) 73'; Yemets (yellow card) 78'	Report	Hutsulyak (yellow card) 8'; Imerekov (yellow card) 18'; Denys Favorov 64', (yellow card) 66'; Budkivskyi (yellow card) 69'; Kartushov 84'	Stadium: Obolon Arena; Attendance: 0 Referee: Yuriy Ivanov
Note: Match was played behind closed doors due to quarantine in Ukraine during COVID-19 pandemic.

6 June 2020 25	Shakhtar Donetsk	3–2	Desna Chernihiv	Kyiv
17:00 EEST (UTC+03:00)	Fernando 4'; Marlos 25', 51'; Matviyenko (yellow card) 31'; Antônio (yellow card) 87'	Report	Dombrovskyi (yellow card) 28'; Favorov 32' (pen.); Kalitvintsev (yellow card) 82'; Budkivskyi (yellow card) 84', (goal) 88'	Stadium: NSC Olimpiyskiy; Attendance: 0 Referee: Serhiy Boyko
Note: Match was played behind closed doors due to quarantine in Ukraine during COVID-19 pandemic.

14 June 2020 26	FC Oleksandriya	1–5	Desna Chernihiv	Oleksandriya
19:30 EEST (UTC+03:00)	Bukhal (yellow card) 43'; Tretyakov 46'; Babohlo (yellow card) 55' (yellow-red card) 60'; Vantukh (yellow card) 69'	Report	Filippov 29', 79' (pen.); Kalitvintsev 44'; Hitchenko 56'; Totovytskyi 90+5'	Stadium: CSC Nika Stadium; Attendance: 0 Referee: Anatoliy Aranovskyi
Note: Match was played behind closed doors due to quarantine in Ukraine during COVID-19 pandemic.

21 June 2020 27	Desna Chernihiv	1–2	Zorya Luhansk	Chernihiv
19:30 EEST (UTC+03:00)	Mostovoy (yellow card) 10'; Imerekov (yellow card) 43'; Hitchenko (yellow card) 53'; Arveladze (yellow card) 66'; Khlyobas (yellow card) 86'; Tamm (yellow card) 90+1'; Favorov 90+8' (pen.)	Report	Kocherhin 6'; Vernydub (yellow card) 24'; Cheberko (yellow card) 32' (yellow-red card) 90+8'; Mykhaylichenko 55'; Lunyov (yellow card) 89'; Hromov (yellow card) 90+3'	Stadium: Chernihiv Stadium; Attendance: 0 Referee: Vitaliy Romanov
Note: Match was played behind closed doors due to quarantine in Ukraine during COVID-19 pandemic.

28 June 2020 28	Desna Chernihiv	3–2	Dynamo Kyiv	Chernihiv
19:30 EEST (UTC+03:00)	Kartushov 12', (yellow card) 27'; Kargbo 25' (o.g.); Ohirya (yellow card) 34'; Hitchenko 90+1'	Report	Tsyhankov 3', 86'; Shepelyev (yellow card) 28'; Shabanov (yellow card) 62'; Kadiri (yellow card) 90+3'	Stadium: Chernihiv Stadium; Attendance: 0 Referee: Kateryna Monzul
Note: Match was played behind closed doors due to quarantine in Ukraine during COVID-19 pandemic.

5 July 2020 29	Desna Chernihiv	5–1	Kolos Kovalivka	Chernihiv
17:00 EEST (UTC+03:00)	Budkivskyi 9'; Denys Favorov (yellow card) 31', (goal) 37', 78' (pen.); Totovytskyi (yellow card) 85', (goal) 90+1'; Starenkyi 87'	Report	Morozko (yellow card) 21'; Bohdanov (yellow card) 43'; Zozulya (yellow card) 77'; Kozhushko 89'; Kostyshyn (yellow card) 89'	Stadium: Chernihiv Stadium; Attendance: 0 Referee: Ihor Paskhal
Note: Match was played behind closed doors due to quarantine in Ukraine during COVID-19 pandemic.

12 July 2020 30	Desna Chernihiv	2–4	Shakhtar Donetsk	Chernihiv
19:30 EEST (UTC+03:00)	Hitchenko 29'; Filippov 62'; Mostovoy (yellow card) 71'	Report	Solomon 25'; Tetê 26'; Maycon 60'; Patrick 69' (pen.)	Stadium: Chernihiv Stadium; Attendance: 0 Referee: Anatoliy Abdula
Note: Match was played behind closed doors due to quarantine in Ukraine during COVID-19 pandemic.

16 July 2020 31	Desna Chernihiv	1–3	FC Oleksandriya	Chernihiv
19:00 EEST (UTC+03:00)	Tamm 8'; Zapadnya (yellow card) 37'	Report	Shastal 32', (yellow card) 54'; Myshenko 57'; Zaderaka 61'	Stadium: Chernihiv Stadium; Attendance: 0 Referee: Maksym Kozyriatskyi
Note: Match was played behind closed doors due to quarantine in Ukraine during COVID-19 pandemic.

19 July 2020 32	Zorya Luhansk	1–1	Desna Chernihiv	Zaporizhia
19:30 EEST (UTC+03:00)	Mykhaylychenko (yellow card) 10'; Khomchenovskyi 53'; Kocherhin (yellow card) 65'; Shevchenko (yellow card) 90+5'	Report	Budkivskyi (yellow card) 1', (goal) 20'; Arveladze (yellow card) 30'; Ohirya (yellow card) 37'; Tamm (yellow card) 45+1'; Imerekov (yellow card) 63'	Stadium: Slavutych-Arena; Attendance: 0 Referee: Vitaliy Romanov
Note: Match was played behind closed doors due to quarantine in Ukraine during COVID-19 pandemic.

=== Ukrainian Cup ===
30 October 2019 Round of 16 (1/8)	MFC Mykolaiv	2–4	Desna Chernihiv	Mykolaiv
14:00 EEST (UTC+03:00)	Sondey 18'; Kravchenko (yellow card) 42' (yellow-red card) 90+1'; Voytsekhovskyi 61'; Berko (yellow card) 90+3'	Report	Kartushov 20', 90+1', (yellow card) 84'; Filippov 32', 64'; Bohdanov (yellow card) 43'; Dombrovskyi (yellow card) 45+2'; Yermakov (yellow card) 90+3'	Stadium: Tsentralnyi Stadion; Attendance: 1,000; Referee: Oleksandr Shandor

12 March 2020 Quarterfinal	Desna Chernihiv	0–1	Vorskla Poltava	Chernihiv
19:00 EET (UTC+02:00)	Kuzyk (yellow card) 41'; Tamm (yellow card) 63'; Yermakov (yellow card) 76'	Report	Kane (yellow card) 34'; Vasin (yellow card) 39', (goal) 64' (pen.); Luizão (yellow card) 41'; Yakubu (yellow card) 55'; Bayenko (yellow card) 60'; Sklyar (yellow card) 76'	Stadium: Chernihiv Stadium; Attendance: 0 Referee: Yevhen Aranovskyi
Note: Match was played behind closed doors due to quarantine in Ukraine during COVID-19 pandemic

== Statistics ==
=== Appearances and goals ===
No.	Pos	Nat	Player	Total		Premier League		Cup	
No.	Pos	Nat	Player	Apps	Goals	Apps	Goals	Apps	Goals
Goalkeepers
35	GK	(Ukraine) UKR	Maksym Tatarenko	0	0	0	0	0	0
44	GK	(Ukraine) UKR	Yevhen Past	31	0	30	0	1	0
72	GK	(Ukraine) UKR	Ihor Lytovka	3	0	2	0	1	0
Defenders
4	DF	(Estonia) EST	Joonas Tamm	14	1	12+1	1	1	0
5	DF	(Ukraine) UKR	Vitaliy Yermakov	12	0	1+9	0	2	0
17	DF	(Ukraine) UKR	Andriy Hitchenko	32	3	29+2	3	1	0
22	DF	(Ukraine) UKR	Andriy Mostovyi	30	0	23+6	0	1	0
26	DF	(Ukraine) UKR	Yukhym Konoplya	24	0	12+10	0	2	0
32	DF	(Ukraine) UKR	Maksym Imerekov	26	2	25	2	1	0
43	DF	(Ukraine) UKR	Artur Zapadnya	7	0	6+1	0	0	0
45	DF	(Ukraine) UKR	Denys Favorov	33	8	31	8	2	0
Midfielders
7	MF	(Ukraine) UKR	Vladyslav Ohirya	28	0	27+1	0	0	0
8	MF	(Ukraine) UKR	Andriy Dombrovskyi	17	0	12+4	0	1	0
9	MF	(Ukraine) UKR	Levan Arveladze	12	1	8+3	1	1	0
11	MF	(Ukraine) UKR	Vladyslav Kalitvintsev	27	6	21+4	6	0+2	0
12	MF	(Ukraine) UKR	Yehor Kartushov	33	4	15+16	2	2	2
20	MF	(Ukraine) UKR	Andriy Totovytskyi	13	4	6+6	4	1	0
25	MF	(Ukraine) UKR	Oleksiy Hutsulyak	4	0	3+1	0	0	0
27	MF	(Ukraine) UKR	Serhiy Starenkyi	9	1	1+7	1	1	0
77	MF	(Ukraine) UKR	Orest Kuzyk	21	1	15+5	1	1	0
Forwards
10	FW	(Ukraine) UKR	Oleksandr Filippov	32	18	26+4	16	1+1	2
13	FW	(Ukraine) UKR	Dmytro Khlyobas	21	7	10+10	7	1	0
28	FW	(Ukraine) UKR	Pylyp Budkivskyi	14	3	5+8	3	0+1	0
Players transferred out during the season
18	DF	(Ukraine) UKR	Vitaliy Pryndeta	2	0	0+1	0	0+1	0
19	MF	(Ukraine) UKR	Artem Favorov	17	1	15+1	1	0+1	0
77	FW	(Ukraine) UKR	Maksym Dehtyarov	14	2	6+8	2	0	0
90	MF	(Ukraine) UKR	Andriy Bohdanov	12	0	11	0	1	0

Source: Competitions

Last updated: 19 July 2020

=== Goalscorers ===
Rank	No.	Pos	Nat	Name	Premier League	Cup	Total
1	10	FW	(Ukraine)	Oleksandr Filippov	16	2	18
2	45	DF	(Ukraine)	Denys Favorov	8	0	8
3	13	FW	(Ukraine)	Dmytro Khlyobas	7	0	7
4	11	MF	(Ukraine)	Vladyslav Kalitvintsev	6	0	6
5	12	MF	(Ukraine)	Yehor Kartushov	2	2	4
5	20	MF	(Ukraine)	Andriy Totovytskyi	4	0	4
7	17	DF	(Ukraine)	Andriy Hitchenko	3	0	3
7	28	FW	(Ukraine)	Pylyp Budkivskyi	3	0	3
9	32	DF	(Ukraine)	Maksym Imerekov	2	0	2
9	77	FW	(Ukraine)	Maksym Dehtyarov	2	0	2
11	4	DF	(Estonia)	Joonas Tamm	1	0	1
11	9	MF	(Ukraine)	Levan Arveladze	1	0	1
11	19	MF	(Ukraine)	Artem Favorov	1	0	1
11	27	MF	(Ukraine)	Serhiy Starenkyi	1	0	1
11	77	MF	(Ukraine)	Orest Kuzyk	1	0	1
				Own goal	1	0	1
				Total	59	4	63

Last updated: 19 July 2020

=== Clean sheets ===
Rank	No.	Pos	Nat	Name	Premier League	Cup	Total
1	44	GK	(Ukraine)	Yevhen Past	11	0	11
1	72	GK	(Ukraine)	Ihor Lytovka	1	0	1
				Total	12	0	12

Last updated: 19 July 2020

=== Disciplinary record ===
No.	Pos	Nat	Player	Premier League			Cup			Total		
No.	Pos	Nat	Player	Yellow card	(yellow card) (yellow-red card)	Red card	Yellow card	(yellow card) (yellow-red card)	Red card	Yellow card	(yellow card) (yellow-red card)	Red card
4	DF	(Estonia)	Joonas Tamm	3	0	0	1	0	0	4	0	0
5	DF	(Ukraine)	Vitaliy Yermakov	0	0	0	2	0	0	2	0	0
7	MF	(Ukraine)	Vladyslav Ohirya	6	0	0	0	0	0	6	0	0
8	MF	(Ukraine)	Andriy Dombrovskyi	2	0	0	1	0	0	3	0	0
9	MF	(Ukraine)	Levan Arveladze	2	0	0	0	0	0	2	0	0
10	FW	(Ukraine)	Oleksandr Filippov	3	0	0	0	0	0	3	0	0
11	MF	(Ukraine)	Vladyslav Kalitvintsev	5	0	0	0	0	0	5	0	0
12	MF	(Ukraine)	Yehor Kartushov	3	0	0	1	0	0	4	0	0
13	FW	(Ukraine)	Dmytro Khlyobas	2	0	0	0	0	0	2	0	0
17	DF	(Ukraine)	Andriy Hitchenko	5	0	0	0	0	0	5	0	0
19	MF	(Ukraine)	Artem Favorov	4	0	0	0	0	0	4	0	0
20	MF	(Ukraine)	Andriy Totovytskyi	2	0	0	0	0	0	2	0	0
22	DF	(Ukraine)	Andriy Mostovyi	7	0	0	0	0	0	7	0	0
25	MF	(Ukraine)	Oleksiy Hutsulyak	1	1	0	0	0	0	1	1	0
26	DF	(Ukraine)	Yukhym Konoplya	2	0	0	0	0	0	2	0	0
27	MF	(Ukraine)	Serhiy Starenkyi	1	0	0	0	0	0	1	0	0
28	FW	(Ukraine)	Pylyp Budkivskyi	5	0	0	0	0	0	5	0	0
32	DF	(Ukraine)	Maksym Imerekov	5	0	0	0	0	0	5	0	0
43	DF	(Ukraine)	Artur Zapadnya	1	0	0	0	0	0	1	0	0
44	GK	(Ukraine)	Yevhen Past	3	0	0	0	0	0	3	0	0
45	DF	(Ukraine)	Denys Favorov	7	0	0	0	0	0	7	0	0
77	FW	(Ukraine)	Maksym Dehtyarov	2	0	0	0	0	0	2	0	0
77	MF	(Ukraine)	Orest Kuzyk	0	0	0	1	0	0	1	0	0
90	MF	(Ukraine)	Andriy Bohdanov	4	0	0	1	0	0	5	0	0
			Total	75	0	1	7	0	0	82	0	1

Last updated: 19 July 2020

=== Attendances ===
	Matches	Attendances	Average	High	Low
Premier League	16	43,125	2,695	5,500	0
Cup	1	0	0	0	0
Total	17	43,125	1,347	5,500	0

Last updated: 19 July 2020
