= Kyrylo Senko =

Ukrainian footballer

Personal information
- Full name: Kyrylo Serhiyovych Senko
- Date of birth: 19 November 2002 (age 23)
- Place of birth: Kyiv, Ukraine
- Height: 1.77 m (5 ft 10 in)
- Position: Left winger

Team information
- Current team: Radnik Križevci
- Number: 19

Youth career
- 2009–2019: Atlet Kyiv
- 2019–2021: Kolos Kovalivka

Senior career*
Years	Team	Apps	(Gls)
2019–2022	Kolos Kovalivka	1	(0)
2023	Radnik Križevci	11	(5)
2023–2024	Cosmos Nowotaniec	12	(5)
2024	KSZO Ostrowiec Świętokrzyski	13	(1)
2024–	Radnik Križevci	12	(2)
- * Club domestic league appearances and goals as of 18 November 2024

Kyrylo Serhiyovych Senko (Ukrainian: Кирило Сергійович Сенько; born 19 November 2002) is a Ukrainian professional footballer who plays as a left winger for Croatian club Radnik Križevci.
