= Denys Antyukh =

Ukrainian footballer

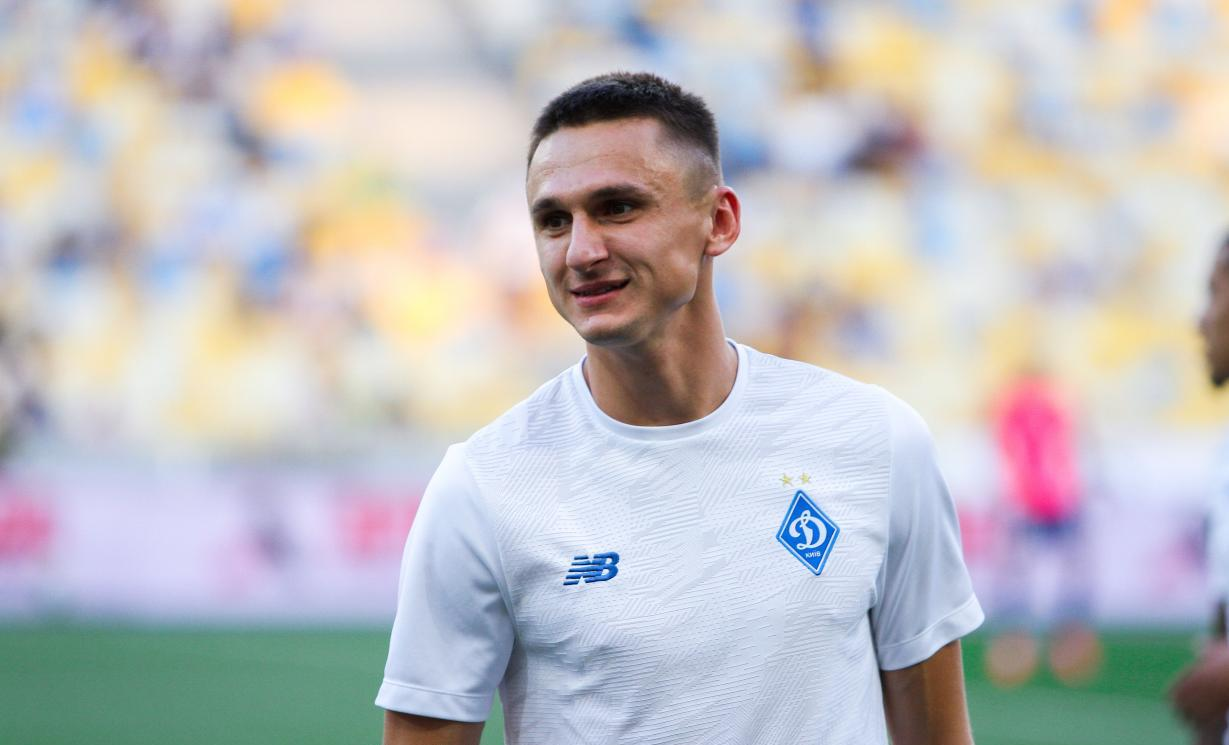

Personal information
- Full name: Denys Mykolayovych Antyukh
- Date of birth: 30 July 1997 (age 29)
- Place of birth: Okhtyrka, Ukraine
- Height: 1.83 m (6 ft 0 in)
- Position: Midfielder

Team information
- Current team: Metalist 1925 Kharkiv
- Number: 15

Youth career
- 2010–2013: Naftovyk-Ukrnafta Okhtyrka
- 2013–2014: UFK-1 Kharkiv

Senior career*
Years	Team	Apps	(Gls)
2014–2018	Naftovyk-Ukrnafta Okhtyrka	49	(0)
2014–2015	→ Naftovyk-Ukrnafta-2 Okhtyrka	6	(6)
2018–2021	Kolos Kovalivka	43	(4)
2019	→ Balkany Zorya (loan)	13	(2)
2021–2022	Dynamo Kyiv	3	(0)
2022–2025	Zorya Luhansk	69	(8)
2025–	Metalist 1925 Kharkiv	37	(6)
- * Club domestic league appearances and goals as of 21/9/26 @ 13:25(AEST)

Denys Mykolayovych Antyukh (Ukrainian: Денис Миколайович Антюх; born 30 July 1997) is a Ukrainian professional footballer who plays as a midfielder for Metalist 1925 Kharkiv.

== Career ==
Born in Okhtyrka, Antyukh is a product of the local Naftovyk-Ukrnafta Okhtyrka and UFK Kharkiv youth sportive schools. He began his career in the amateur level (Naftovyk-Ukrnafta-2 in Sumy Oblast), but in a short time was joined to the main team squad and played in the Ukrainian First League.

In July 2018 he signed his next contract with another Ukrainian First League side Kolos Kovalivka. He made his debut in the Ukrainian Premier League for Kolos (after this team was promoted) on 11 August 2019, playing as the second half-time substituted player in a losing home match against Zorya Luhansk.
