= Oleh Kozhushko =

Ukrainian footballer

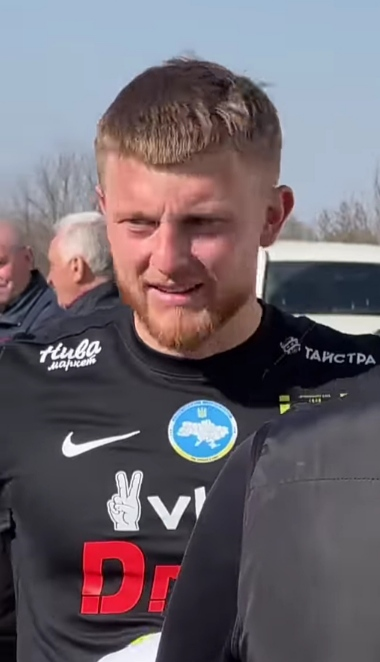

Personal information
- Full name: Oleh Oleksandrovych Kozhushko
- Date of birth: 17 February 1998 (age 28)
- Place of birth: Mykolaiv, Ukraine
- Height: 1.73 m (5 ft 8 in)
- Position: Midfielder

Team information
- Current team: Bukovyna Chernivtsi
- Number: 7

Youth career
- 2010–2012: Torpedo Mykolaiv
- 2012–2015: Dnipro Dnipropetrovsk

Senior career*
Years	Team	Apps	(Gls)
2015–2017	Dnipro	14	(0)
2017–2020	Dnipro-1	32	(11)
2019–2020	→ Kolos Kovalivka (loan)	22	(1)
2020	Chornomorets Odesa	10	(1)
2021	Pyunik Yerevan	13	(2)
2021–2023	Oleksandriya	41	(2)
2023–2025	Kryvbas Kryvyi Rih	38	(10)
2025–	Bukovyna Chernivtsi	32	(9)

International career^{‡}
2014	Ukraine U16	3	(0)
2014–2015	Ukraine U17	9	(1)
2016	Ukraine U18	1	(0)
2017	Ukraine U19	2	(0)
2019	Ukraine U21	4	(1)
- * Club domestic league appearances and goals as of 3 June 2026 ‡ National team caps and goals as of 3 July 2023

Oleh Oleksandrovych Kozhushko (Ukrainian: Олег Олександрович Кожушко; born 17 February 1998) is a Ukrainian professional footballer who plays as a midfielder for Bukovyna Chernivtsi.

== Career ==
Kozhushko is a product of the Torpedo Mykolaiv and FC Dnipro academies. His first trainers were Ivan Dzyaba (in FC Torpedo) and Ihor Khomenko (in FC Dnipro).

In 2015, he signed a contract with FC Dnipro, and played in the FC Dnipro Dnipropetrovsk reserves. He made his senior debut against FC Olimpik Donetsk on 15 May 2016 in the Ukrainian Premier League.

On 20 February 2021, Kozhushko signed for FC Pyunik, leaving the club on 4 June when his contract was terminated.

== Career statistics ==
As of 25 November 2021

Appearances and goals by club, season and competition
Club	Season	League			Cup		Continental		Other		Total	
Club	Season	Division	Apps	Goals	Apps	Goals	Apps	Goals	Apps	Goals	Apps	Goals
Dnipro	2015–16	Ukrainian Premier League	1	0	0	0	0	0	—		1	0
Dnipro	2016–17	Ukrainian Premier League	13	0	2	0	—		—		15	0
Dnipro	Total		14	0	2	0	0	0	—		16	0
Dnipro-1	2017–18	Ukrainian Second League	13	9	2	1	—		—		15	10
Dnipro-1	2018–19	Ukrainian First League	19	2	2	0	—		—		21	2
Dnipro-1	Total		32	11	4	1	—		—		36	12
Kolos Kovalivka (loan)	2019–20	Ukrainian Premier League	22	1	1	0	—		0	0	23	1
Chornomorets Odesa	2020–21	Ukrainian First League	10	1	1	0	—		—		11	1
Pyunik	2020–21	Armenian Premier League	13	2	1	0	—		—		14	2
Oleksandriya	2021–22	Ukrainian Premier League	11	1	2	1	—		—		13	2
Career total			102	16	11	2	0	0	0	0	113	18
