= Dzhemal Kyzylatesh =

Turkish-born Ukrainian footballer

Personal information
- Full name: Dzhemal Ali Kyzylatesh
- Date of birth: 14 March 1994 (age 32)
- Place of birth: Istanbul, Turkey
- Height: 1.78 m (5 ft 10 in)
- Position: Midfielder

Team information
- Current team: Sebatspor
- Number: 14

Youth career
- 2007–2008: KSDYSOR Kyiv
- 2008–2009: Youth Sportive School #15 Kyiv
- 2009–2011: FC Zirka Kyiv

Senior career*
Years	Team	Apps	(Gls)
2011–2013	FC Volodarka (amateur)		
2013–2015	Arsenal-Kyivshchyna Bila Tserkva	34	(4)
2014–2015	→ Vorskla Poltava (loan)	1	(0)
2015–2016	Vorskla Poltava	0	(0)
2016–2018	Arsenal Kyiv	59	(6)
2018–2019	Kolos Kovalivka	31	(2)
2020	Volyn Lutsk	17	(2)
2021–2022	Balıkesirspor	17	(1)
2022–2024	Isparta 32 SK	76	(9)
2024–2026	Muğlaspor	63	(8)
2026–	Sebatspor	11	(1)
- * Club domestic league appearances and goals as of 14 November 2026

Dzhemal Kyzylatesh (Ukrainian: Джемаль Алієвич Кизилатеш; Turkish: Cemâl Ali Kizilateş; born 14 March 1994) is a Turkish-born Ukrainian midfielder who plays for TFF 2. Lig club Sebatspor.

== Career ==
Of ethnic Turkish origin, Kyzylatesh was born in Turkey and moved to Ukraine with his parents at the age of seven years. He is a product of the different Youth Sportive Schools from Kyiv, and his first trainer was Oleksiy Yakovenko.

Kyzylatesh's professional career continued, when he was promoted from Arsenal-Kyivshchyna on loan to FC Vorskla Poltava in the Ukrainian Premier League in July 2014. From July 2015 he signed full contract with Vorskla Poltava.
