= Oleksandr Pozdeyev =

Ukrainian footballer

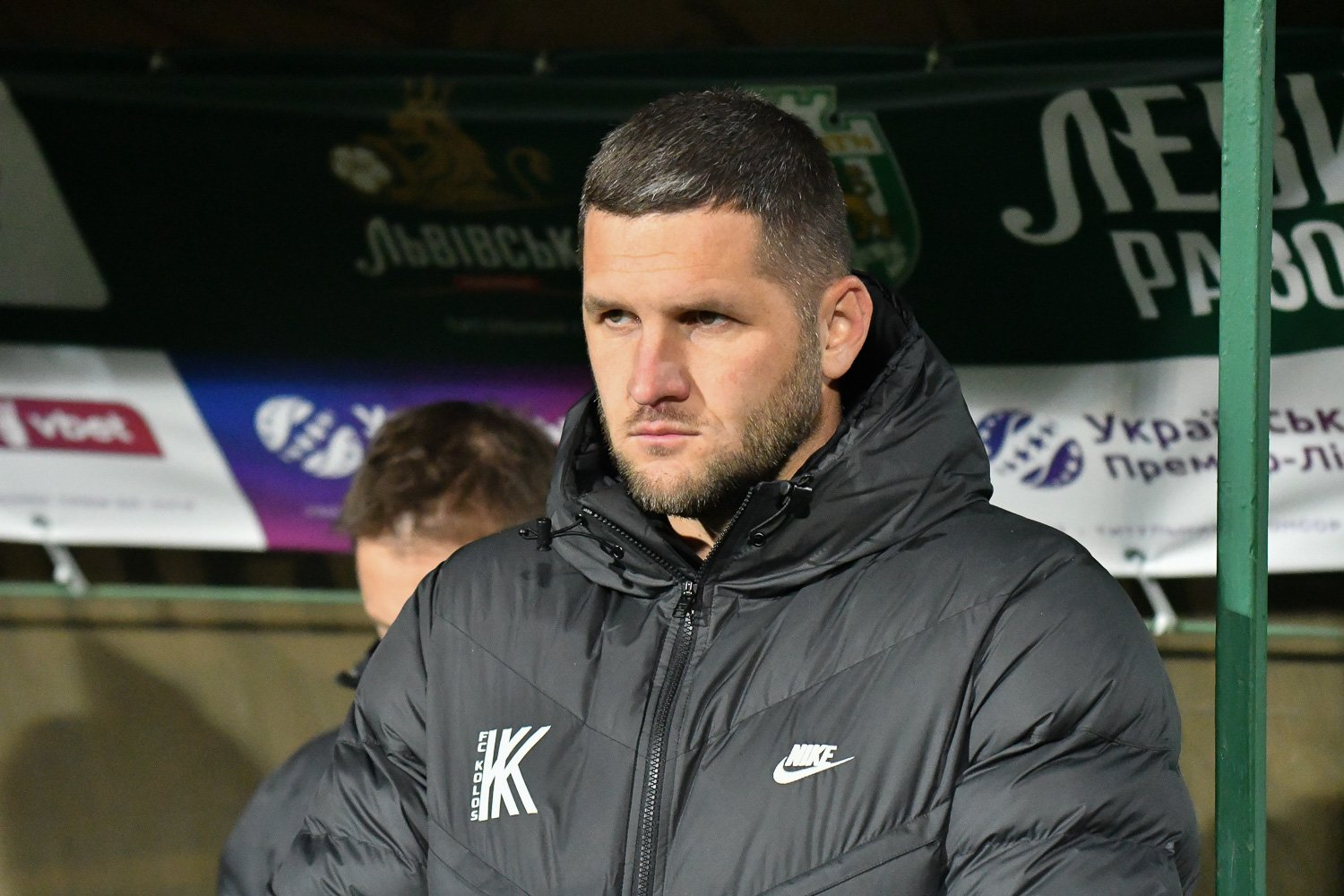

Personal information
- Full name: Oleksandr Serhiyovych Pozdeyev
- Date of birth: 14 June 1986 (age 40)
- Place of birth: Kyiv, Ukrainian SSR, Soviet Union
- Height: 1.87 m (6 ft 2 in)
- Position: Midfielder

Youth career
- 2000–2001: CSKA Kyiv
- 2001: ATEK Kyiv
- 2002–2003: CSKA/Arsenal Kyiv

Senior career*
Years	Team	Apps	(Gls)
2003–2005	Arsenal Kyiv	0	(0)
2003–2004	→ Arsenal-2 Kyiv	23	(4)
2004	→ Zirka Kirovohrad (loan)	7	(0)
2007	Yednist Plysky	24	(5)
2008	Prykarpattya Ivano-Frankivsk	16	(0)
2008	Nafkom Brovary	20	(4)
2009	CSKA Kyiv	12	(2)
2009	Veres Rivne	8	(0)
2010	AGMK Almalyk	7	(0)
2012–2015	Kolos Kovalivka (amateur)	?	(?)
2015–2019	Kolos Kovalivka	107	(20)

Managerial career
- 2020–2024: Kolos Kovalivka (U19)
- 2024: Kolos Kovalivka (caretaker)
- 2024–2025: Kolos Kovalivka
- * Club domestic league appearances and goals

Oleksandr Serhiyovych Pozdeyev (Ukrainian: Олександр Сергійович Поздеєв; born 14 June 1986) is a Ukrainian professional football coach and a former midfielder.

== Playing career ==
Pozdeyev is a product of couple of the Kyiv city football academy Arsenal and ATEK. For short period of time in 2010-2012 he fell out of traceable football competition after FC Veres Rivne went bankrupt back in 2009. Pozdeyev became noticeable sometime later after 2012 joining FC Kolos Kovalivka when during the 2016-17 Ukrainian First League season he scored 10 goals.
