= Oleksandr Bondarenko (footballer, born 1989) =

Ukrainian footballer

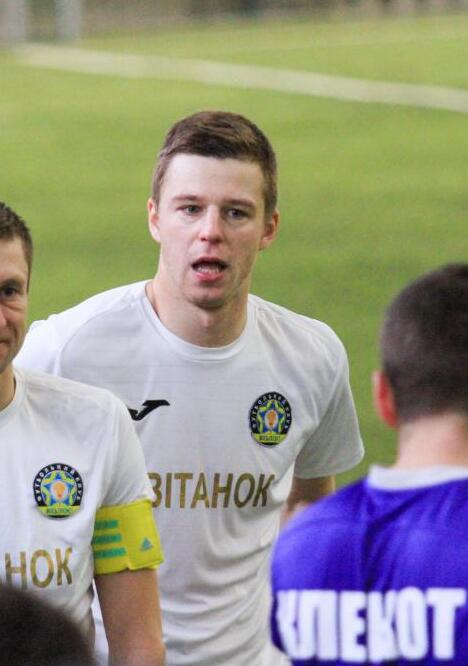

Personal information
- Full name: Oleksandr Ihorovych Bondarenko
- Date of birth: 28 July 1989 (age 37)
- Place of birth: Kyiv, Ukrainian SSR, Soviet Union
- Height: 1.83 m (6 ft 0 in)
- Position: Forward

Youth career
- 2002–2003: Zmina-Obolon Kyiv
- 2006: Sports school 15 (Kyiv)

Senior career*
Years	Team	Apps	(Gls)
2008–2012	Obolon Kyiv	26	(0)
2008–2012	→ Obolon-2 Kyiv	34	(4)
2009	→ Nyva Vinnytsia (loan)	10	(4)
2013–2014	Aqvital Csákvári TK	12	(6)
2014–2020	Kolos Kovalivka	127	(48)
2020	→ Volyn Lutsk (loan)	8	(1)
2021	Juniors Shpytki (amateur)	0	(0)
2022–2023	Shturm Ivankiv (amateur)	0	(0)
2025–2026	VIVAD Romaniv (amateur)	0	(0)
2026	Druzhba-Kozaky	0	(0)
2026–	Bucha	0	(0)
- * Club domestic league appearances and goals as of 6 September 2026

Oleksandr Ihorovych Bondarenko (Ukrainian: Олександр Ігорович Бондаренко; born 28 July 1989) is a professional Ukrainian football midfielder who played for FC Volyn Lutsk in the Ukrainian First League.

Oleksandr Bondarenko is a product of the FC Obolon Kyiv football academy. He became noticeable in 2015 averaging a goal per game after the first eight rounds of the 2015–16 season in the Ukrainian Second League with whom the newly promoted Kolos secured leading positions in the league.
