= Yevhen Yefremov =

Ukrainian footballer

Personal information
- Full name: Yevhen Serhiyovych Yefremov
- Date of birth: 17 January 1994 (age 32)
- Place of birth: Donetsk, Ukraine
- Height: 1.81 m (5 ft 11 in)
- Position: Right-back

Youth career
- 2007–2011: Shakhtar Donetsk

Senior career*
Years	Team	Apps	(Gls)
2011–2015	Shakhtar Donetsk	0	(0)
2015	Illichivets Mariupol	7	(0)
2016	Kramfors-Alliansen		
2017	Härnösand	19	(1)
2018–2019	Obolon-Brovar Kyiv	46	(3)
2020	Kolos Kovalivka	10	(0)
2020–2021	Sūduva	39	(3)
2022	Mynai	0	(0)
2022	Sūduva	4	(0)
2023–2025	FA Šiauliai	53	(2)

International career^{‡}
2010	Ukraine U16	4	(0)
2009	Ukraine U17	3	(0)
- * Club domestic league appearances and goals as of 3 December 2025 ‡ National team caps and goals as of 9 February 2018

Yevhen Serhiyovych Yefremov (Ukrainian: Євген Сергійович Єфремов; born 17 January 1994) is a Ukrainian professional footballer who plays as a right-back for FA Šiauliai.

== Career ==
Yevfremov was born in Donetsk. Yefremov is a product of the FC Shakhtar youth sportive school.

In July 2015 he signed a contract with the Ukrainian First League club FC Illichivets Mariupol.
