= Andriy Sakhnevych =

Ukrainian footballer

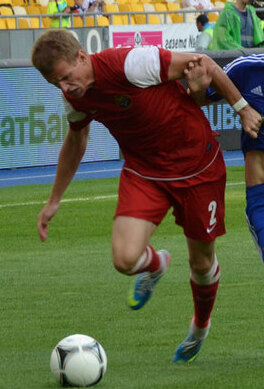
- Sakhnevych playing for Metalurh Zaporizhzhia in 2013

Personal information
- Full name: Andriy Volodymyrovych Sakhnevych
- Date of birth: 17 April 1989 (age 37)
- Place of birth: Zhytomyr, Soviet Union (now Ukraine)
- Height: 1.82 m (6 ft 0 in)
- Position: Defender

Youth career
- 2002–2003: Polissya Zhytomyr
- 2003–2006: Dynamo Kyiv

Senior career*
Years	Team	Apps	(Gls)
2006–2010	Dynamo Kyiv	0	(0)
2006–2008	Dynamo-3 Kyiv	35	(2)
2006–2010	Dynamo-2 Kyiv	15	(2)
2011–2013	Oleksandriya	13	(0)
2013–2014	Metalurh Zaporizhzhia	36	(1)
2015–2016	KAMAZ Naberezhnye Chelny	11	(1)
2017	Hirnyk-Sport Horishni Plavni	18	(0)
2017–2019	Kolos Kovalivka	57	(0)
2020–2021	Ventspils	31	(0)
2021–2022	Polissya Zhytomyr	12	(0)
2023–	Ilpar (Ilyinsky)		

International career
2005	Ukraine U17	3	(0)
2006–2007	Ukraine U18	3	(1)
2009	Ukraine U21	4	(0)
- * Club domestic league appearances and goals as of 26 August 2022

Andriy Volodymyrovych Sakhnevych (Ukrainian: Андрій Володимирович Сахневич; Russian: Андрей Владимирович Сахневич; born 17 April 1989) is a Ukrainian and Russian professional footballer, who currently plays as a defender for Ilpar (Ilyinsky) in the Ural and Western Siberia division of the Russian Amateur Football League (regionalised fourth tier in the Russian football pyramid).
