= Stanislav Sorokin (footballer) =

Ukrainian footballer

Personal information
- Full name: Stanislav Yuriyovych Sorokin
- Date of birth: 3 May 2000 (age 26)
- Place of birth: Kyiv, Ukraine
- Height: 1.74 m (5 ft 9 in)
- Position: Midfielder

Youth career
- 2008–2013: Troyeshchyna Kyiv
- 2013–2019: Dynamo Kyiv

Senior career*
Years	Team	Apps	(Gls)
2019–2022	Kolos Kovalivka	6	(1)
2020	→ Kremin Kremenchuk (loan)	16	(6)
2021	→ Lviv (loan)	2	(0)
2022	Shevardeni-1906 Tbilisi	10	(1)
2022–2024	Dainava	79	(14)
2025	Hibernians	10	(0)

International career^{‡}
2016	Ukraine U16	4	(1)
- * Club domestic league appearances and goals as of 26 June 2025 ‡ National team caps and goals as of 28 August 2020

Stanislav Yuriyovych Sorokin (Ukrainian: Станіслав Юрійович Сорокін; born 3 May 2000) is a professional Ukrainian football midfielder who plays for the Maltese Premier League club Hibernians.

== Career ==
Sorokin is a product of the FC Dynamo Kyiv Youth Sportive School system and competed for this team in the Ukrainian Youth Football League.

In July 2019, he joined the newly promoted Ukrainian Premier League side FC Kolos Kovalivka and made his debut in an away losing match against FC Oleksandriya on 14 March 2020, in the Ukrainian Premier League, appearing as a main-squad player.
