= Oleksandr Chornomorets =

Ukrainian footballer

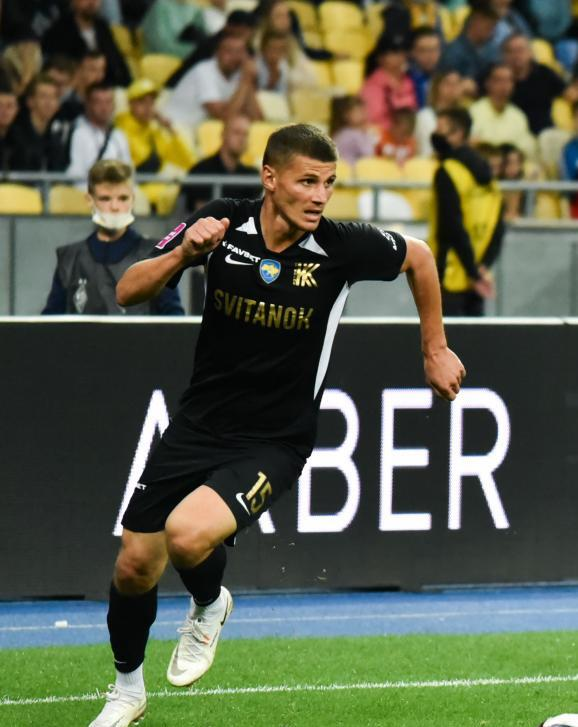

Personal information
- Full name: Oleksandr Serhiyovych Chornomorets
- Date of birth: 5 April 1993 (age 33)
- Place of birth: Zelenodolsk, Ukraine
- Height: 1.85 m (6 ft 1 in)
- Position: Defender

Team information
- Current team: Feniks Mariupol
- Number: 5

Youth career
- 2006–2007: Inter Dnipropetrovsk
- 2007–2009: RVUFK Kyiv
- 2009–2010: BRW-ВІК Volodymyr-Volynskyi

Senior career*
Years	Team	Apps	(Gls)
2010	Skala Morshyn	9	(0)
2011–2015	Dynamo Kyiv	0	(0)
2012–2015	→ Dynamo-2 Kyiv	87	(0)
2015–2018	Desna Chernihiv	51	(0)
2018	Volyn Lutsk	12	(1)
2018–2024	Kolos Kovalivka	110	(3)
2024–	Vorskla Poltava	13	(0)
2025	→ Metalist 1925 Kharkiv (loan)	3	(0)
2025–	Feniks Mariupol	11	(0)

International career^{‡}
2010–2011	Ukraine U18	5	(0)
2010–2012	Ukraine U19	20	(0)
- * Club domestic league appearances and goals as of 4 June 2026 ‡ National team caps and goals as of 19 July 2018

Oleksandr Chornomorets (Ukrainian: Олександр Сергійович Чорноморець; born 5 April 1993) is a Ukrainian professional footballer who plays as a defender for Feniks Mariupol in the Ukrainian First League.

== Career ==
Chornomorets is a product of the different Ukrainian youth sportive schools and then played in FC Morshyn in the Ukrainian Second League. In 2011, he signed a contract with FC Dynamo in the Ukrainian Premier League and from June 2012 he played in the Ukrainian First League.

On 13 July 2024, Chornomorets joined Vorskla Poltava on a one-season contract.

On 25 January 2026, he signed for Feniks Mariupol.

== Hounours ==
Kolos Kovalivka

- Ukrainian First League: 2018–19
