= Vyacheslav Ryabov =

Ukrainian footballer

Personal information
- Full name: Vyacheslav Heorhiyovych Ryabov
- Date of birth: 21 June 1989 (age 37)
- Place of birth: Kryvyi Rih, Ukrainian SSR
- Height: 1.81 m (5 ft 11 1/2 in)
- Position: Midfielder

Team information
- Current team: Kryvbas Kryvyi Rih
- Number: 2

Youth career
- –2007: Kryvbas Kryvyi Rih

Senior career*
Years	Team	Apps	(Gls)
2007–2012	Kryvbas Kryvyi Rih	1	(0)
2012	→ Hirnyk Kryvyi Rih (loan)	9	(0)
2012–2016	Hirnyk Kryvyi Rih	110	(9)
2016–2020	Kolos Kovalivka	73	(7)
2020–2024	Kryvbas Kryvyi Rih	53	(4)
2022	→ Unia Solec Kujawski (loan)		
- * Club domestic league appearances and goals as of 15 March 2024

Vyacheslav Ryabov (Ukrainian: В'ячеслав Георгійович Рябов; born 21 June 1989) was a Ukrainian professional footballer who played as a midfielder.

== Career ==
Born in Kryvyi Rih, Dnipropetrovsk Oblast, Ukrainian SSR, Ryabov is a product of his native FC Kryvbas Kryvyi Rih Youth Sportive School.

He signed contract with FC Kryvbas in 2007, but made only one appearance in the Ukrainian Premier League, as substituted player in the game against FC Dnipro Dnipropetrovsk on 16 May 2009. Then he played for football clubs in the Ukrainian Second League or in the Ukrainian First League.
