= Maksym Imerekov =

Ukrainian footballer

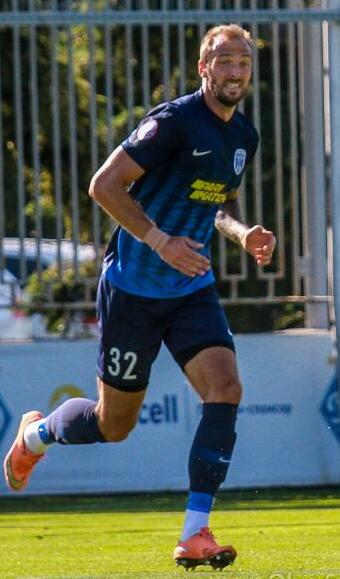

Personal information
- Full name: Maksym Ihorovych Imerekov
- Date of birth: 23 January 1991 (age 35)
- Place of birth: Makiivka, Ukrainian SSR
- Height: 1.85 m (6 ft 1 in)
- Position: Defender

Team information
- Current team: Metalist 1925 Kharkiv
- Number: 32

Youth career
- 2005–2008: Shakhtar Donetsk

Senior career*
Years	Team	Apps	(Gls)
2008–2011	Shakhtar Donetsk	0	(0)
2008–2010	→ Shakhtar-3 Donetsk	13	(1)
2011–2013	Metalurh Zaporizhzhia	10	(0)
2011–2012	→ Metalurh-2 Zaporizhzhia	9	(0)
2013	Belshina Bobruisk	0	(0)
2014–2016	Oleksandriya	38	(3)
2016–2017	Torpedo-BelAZ Zhodino	27	(2)
2017–2018	Ermis Aradippou	26	(2)
2018–2021	Desna Chernihiv	61	(4)
2021–2023	Zorya Luhansk	46	(5)
2023–2024	Atromitos	7	(0)
2024–	Metalist 1925 Kharkiv	35	(4)

International career^{‡}
2008–2009	Ukraine U17	4	(0)
2008–2009	Ukraine U18	7	(1)
2008–2010	Ukraine U19	3	(0)
2010	Ukraine U20	4	(0)
2010	Ukraine U21	1	(0)
- * Club domestic league appearances and goals as of 10 June 2025 ‡ National team caps and goals as of 15 October 2021

Maksym Ihorovych Imerekov (Ukrainian: Максим Ігорович Імереков; born 23 January 1991) is a Ukrainian professional footballer who plays as a defender for Metalist 1925 Kharkiv.

== Career ==
Imerekov is a product of youth team system FC Shakhtar Donetsk.

In July 2011 he signed a contract with FC Metalurh of the Ukrainian First League.

=== Desna Chernihiv ===
In 2018 he moved to Desna Chernihiv in Ukraine. In May 2021, he was released by the club.

== Honours ==
Oleksandriya

- Ukrainian First League: 2014–15
