= Oleksiy Zozulya =

Ukrainian footballer

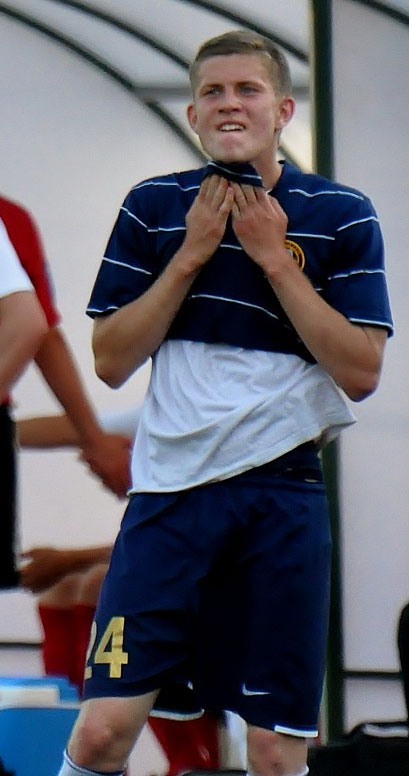
- Oleksiy Zozulya in 2011.

Personal information
- Full name: Oleksiy Volodymyrovych Zozulya
- Date of birth: 15 April 1992 (age 34)
- Place of birth: Kyiv, Ukraine
- Height: 1.77 m (5 ft 9 1/2 in)
- Position: Defender

Team information
- Current team: UCSA Tarasivka
- Number: 24

Youth career
- 2005–2009: Dynamo Kyiv

Senior career*
Years	Team	Apps	(Gls)
2010–2012	Metalurh Zaporizhzhia	0	(0)
2010–2011	→ Metalurh-2 Zaporizhzhia	22	(1)
2012–2015	Poltava	77	(4)
2012–2013	→ Poltava-2 Karlivka	13	(1)
2016	Hoverla Uzhhorod	0	(0)
2016–2017	Veres Rivne	39	(1)
2017–2023	Kolos Kovalivka	73	(0)
2021–2022	→ Lviv (loan)	12	(0)
2023–2024	Viktoriya Sumy	10	(0)
2024	Druzhba Myrivka	4	(0)
2024–	UCSA Tarasivka	16	(1)

International career^{‡}
2014	Ukraine-21	2	(0)
- * Club domestic league appearances and goals as of 10 June 2025 ‡ National team caps and goals as of 20 June 2021

Oleksiy Zozulya (Ukrainian: Олексій Володимирович Зозуля; born 15 April 1992) is a professional Ukrainian football defender who plays for UCSA Tarasivka in the Ukrainian First League.

Zozulya is the product of the FC Dynamo Kyiv School System. He signed a contract with the Ukrainian Premier League club FC Metalurh Zaporizhzhia, but did not appear for the main team. In March 2012 he signed a deal with the Ukrainian First League club FC Poltava.
