= Maksym Maksymenko =

Ukrainian footballer (born 1990)

Personal information
- Full name: Maksym Oleksandrovych Maksymenko
- Date of birth: 28 May 1990 (age 36)
- Place of birth: Kramatorsk, Ukrainian SSR
- Height: 1.81 m (5 ft 11 in)
- Position: Centre-back

Team information
- Current team: TSV Grein

Youth career
- 2003–2007: Shakhtar Donetsk

Senior career*
Years	Team	Apps	(Gls)
2007–2010	Shakhtar Donetsk	0	(0)
2007–2010	→ Shakhtar-3 Donetsk	61	(1)
2009	→ Krymteplytsia Molodizhne (loan)	2	(0)
2010–2013	Tiraspol	55	(3)
2013–2014	Stal Alchevsk	39	(0)
2015	Spartaks Jūrmala	24	(0)
2016–2017	Desna Chernihiv	37	(2)
2017–2020	Kolos Kovalivka	68	(0)
2021–2024	AEL	43	(0)
2024–2026	Dainava	62	(3)
2026–	TSV Grein	0	(0)

International career^{‡}
2005–2006	Ukraine U16	12	(1)
2006–2007	Ukraine U17	23	(0)
2008–2009	Ukraine U18	14	(0)
- * Club domestic league appearances and goals as of 29 July 2026 (UTC) ‡ National team caps and goals as of 23 September 2020

Maksym Maksymenko (Ukrainian: Максим Олександрович Максименко; born 28 May 1990) is a Ukrainian professional footballer who last played as a centre-back for TSV Grein.

== Career ==
Maksymenko is a product of FC Shakhtar youth sportive school . He began his professional career in 2007 with FC Shakhtar-3 Donetsk.

=== Krymteplytsia Molodizhne ===
In the summer of 2009 he played at Krymteplytsia Molodizhne on loan.

=== Tiraspol ===
In 2010 he moved to the Moldovan club FC Tiraspol. As part of the team, he became the owner of the Moldavian Cup and the bronze medalist of the Moldovan National Division. In the summer of 2013 he returned to Ukraine, where he played for FC Stal Alchevsk. After Stal stopped playing in the Ukrainian championship, he moved to Latvia. Took part in the qualifying matches of the Europa League against the clubs FK Budućnost Podgorica (3–1, 0–0) and FK Vojvodina (0–3, 1–1).

=== Desna Chernihiv ===
In 2016, he signed a contract with Desna Chernihiv, the main club in Chernihiv in which he spent a season and a half, winning silver medals in the Ukrainian First League.

=== Kolos Kovalivka ===
In July 2017 he moved to FC Kolos Kovalivka in Ukrainian First League. In the season 2018–19 with the team he got promoted to Ukrainian Premier League.

=== AEL ===
In January 2021 he moved to AEL in Super League Greece. He played his first match with the new club in Greek Cup against PAOK in the season 2020–21.

== Career statistics ==
=== Club ===
As of match played 14 March 2025

Appearances and goals by club, season and competition
Club	Season	League			Cup		Europe		Other		Total	
Club	Season	Division	Apps	Goals	Apps	Goals	Apps	Goals	Apps	Goals	Apps	Goals
Shakhtar-3 Donetsk	2007–08	Ukrainian Second League	19	0	0	0	0	0	0	0	19	0
Shakhtar-3 Donetsk	2008–09	Ukrainian Second League	26	1	0	0	0	0	0	0	26	1
Krymteplytsia Molodizhne (loan)	2009–10	Ukrainian First League	2	0	1	0	0	0	0	0	3	0
Shakhtar-3 Donetsk	2009–10	Ukrainian Second League	16	0	0	0	0	0	0	0	16	0
Tiraspol	2010–11	Moldovan National Division	17	1	0	0	0	0	0	0	17	1
Tiraspol	2011–12	Moldovan National Division	13	0	0	0	0	0	0	0	13	0
Tiraspol	2012–13	Moldovan National Division	25	2	1	0	0	0	0	0	26	2
Stal Alchevsk	2013–14	Ukrainian First League	24	0	1	0	0	0	0	0	25	0
Stal Alchevsk	2014–15	Ukrainian First League	15	0	0	0	0	0	0	0	15	0
Spartaks Jūrmala	2015	Latvian Higher League	22	0	2	0	4	0	0	0	28	0
Desna Chernihiv	2015–16	Ukrainian First League	11	0	0	0	0	0	0	0	11	0
Desna Chernihiv	2016–17	Ukrainian First League	26	2	2	0	0	0	0	0	28	2
Kolos Kovalivka	2017–18	Ukrainian First League	17	0	1	0	0	0	0	0	18	0
Kolos Kovalivka	2018–19	Ukrainian First League	25	0	2	0	0	0	0	0	27	0
Kolos Kovalivka	2019–20	Ukrainian Premier League	20	0	1	0	0	0	0	0	21	0
Kolos Kovalivka	2020–21	Ukrainian Premier League	6	0	2	0	0	0	0	0	8	0
AEL	2020–21	Super League Greece	13	0	1	0	0	0	0	0	14	0
AEL	2021–22	Super League Greece 2	18	0	1	0	0	0	0	0	19	0
AEL	2022–23	Super League Greece 2	5	0	0	0	0	0	0	0	5	0
Dainava	2024	A Lyga	30	2	1	0	0	0	0	0	31	2
Dainava	2025	A Lyga	3	0	0	0	0	0	0	0	3	0
Career total			353	8	15	0	4	0	0	0	379	8

== Honours ==
Kolos Kovalivka

- Ukrainian First League: 2018–19

Desna Chernihiv

- Ukrainian First League: 2016–17

FC Tiraspol

- Moldovan Cup: 2012–13
