= Oleksandr Volkov (footballer, born 1989) =

Ukrainian footballer

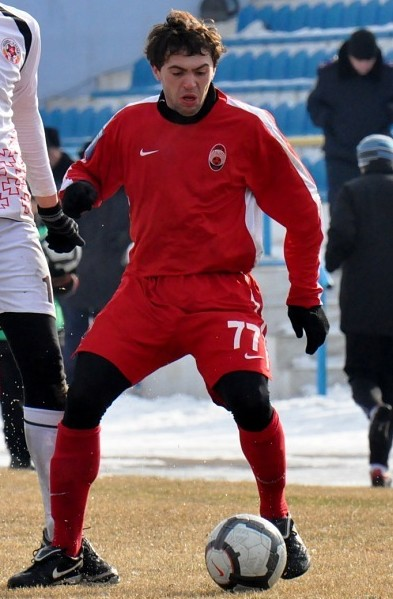

Personal information
- Full name: Oleksandr Mykolayovych Volkov
- Date of birth: 7 February 1989 (age 37)
- Place of birth: Kyiv, Ukrainian SSR
- Height: 1.82 m (5 ft 11 1/2 in)
- Position: Midfielder

Team information
- Current team: Rebel Kyiv
- Number: 89

Youth career
- 2002–2003: Obolon Kyiv
- 2004–2006: Dynamo Kyiv

Senior career*
Years	Team	Apps	(Gls)
2006–2008	Dynamo Kyiv	0	(0)
2006–2008	→ Dynamo-3 Kyiv	18	(0)
2008–2009	Mykolaiv	12	(1)
2009–2012	Zorya Luhansk	5	(0)
2011–2012	→ Olimpik Donetsk (loan)	43	(3)
2012–2014	Olimpik Donetsk	29	(4)
2014	Belshina Bobruisk	14	(0)
2015	Poltava	9	(0)
2016	Olimpik Donetsk	3	(0)
2016–2021	Desna Chernihiv	78	(12)
2019–2020	→ Kolos Kovalivka (loan)	10	(1)
2021	LNZ Cherkasy	7	(0)
2022–2024	Shturm Ivankiv	15	(0)
2024–2025	Kolos-2 Kovalivka	0	(0)
2025–	Rebel Kyiv	6	(0)

International career^{‡}
2004	Ukraine-15	1	(0)
2004–2005	Ukraine-16	13	(3)
2005–2006	Ukraine-17	10	(2)
- * Club domestic league appearances and goals as of 10 May 2026 ‡ National team caps and goals as of 25 December 2020

Oleksandr Mykolayovych Volkov (Ukrainian: Олександр Миколайович Волков; born 7 February 1989) is a professional Ukrainian football midfielder who plays for Rebel Kyiv.

== Career ==
He is a product of the FC Obolon Kyiv and FC Dynamo Kyiv sportive schools. He spent time with different Ukrainian teams that played in the Ukrainian First League. In November 2009, he signed a contract with the Ukrainian Premier League FC Zorya Luhansk.

=== Desna Chernihiv ===
In 2016-2017 he played Desna Chernihiv, the main club in Chernihiv. With the club, he got promoted in Ukrainian Premier League, after the season 2017–18 in Ukrainian First League.

=== Kolos Kovalivka (On Loan) ===
In summer 2019 we moved on loan to Kolos Kovalivka, where he played 10 matches and scored 1 goal against Karpaty Lviv giving the victory for 2-1 for his club. On 29 July 2020, with FC Kolos in overtime beat FC Mariupol 1–0 and qualified for the European competitions.

=== Desna Chernihiv ===
In summer 2020 he return to Desna Chernihiv and he made his debut in Ukrainian Premier League for the season 2020-21 in the match against Vorskla Poltava at the Stadion Yuri Gagarin. On 31 January 2021, he played in the friendly match against PFC Lokomotiv Tashkent. On 17 April 2021 he played against FC Mynai replacing Levan Arveladze at the 54 minute of the second half. In summer 2021 his contract was ended with the club of Desna Chernihiv, becoming the club with most appearances in his career.

=== LNZ Cherkasy ===
On 4 July 2021, he moved to LNZ Cherkasy, just promoted in Ukrainian Second League. On 30 August 2021 he made his debut with the new team against AFSC Kyiv replacing Oleksandr Nasonov at the 85 minute. On 31 August 2021 he played in the Third preliminary round, of Ukrainian Cup against Olimpik Donetsk in the season 2021–22 and qualified for the 63 round of the ukrainian cup. On 11 September 2021 he played against FC Chernihiv in Ukrainian Second League in the season 2021-22. On 22 September 2021 he played in Ukrainian Cup against Inhulets Petrove getting into the quarterfinal of the competition for the first time in the history of the club. On 1 December 2021 he played in the eight final of Ukrainian Cup against Dnipro-1 in the season 2021–22.

== Honours ==
Desna Chernihiv

- Ukrainian First League: 2017–18

Olimpik Donetsk

- Ukrainian First League: 2013–14
