= Vadym Milko =

Ukrainian footballer

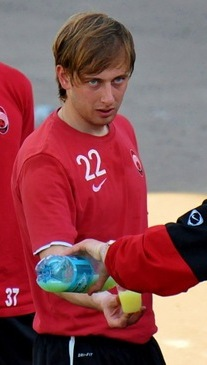

Personal information
- Birth name: Vadym Ivanovych Milko
- Date of birth: 22 August 1986 (age 40)
- Place of birth: Pervomaisk, Soviet Union (now Ukraine)
- Height: 1.83 m (6 ft 0 in)
- Position: Central midfielder

Senior career*
Years	Team	Apps	(Gls)
2002–2008	Dynamo Kyiv	2	(0)
2002–2003	→ Dynamo-3 Kyiv	27	(0)
2004–2008	→ Dynamo-2 Kyiv	76	(12)
2008–2009	Kharkiv	39	(0)
2009–2012	Zorya Luhansk	44	(1)
2012	Vorskla Poltava	2	(0)
2013	Belshina Bobruisk	28	(3)
2014–2016	Slutsk	71	(0)
2017	Veres Rivne	1	(0)
2017–2024	Kolos Kovalivka	169	(13)

International career
2002	Ukraine U16	4	(0)
2002–2003	Ukraine U17	9	(1)
2003–2004	Ukraine U18	7	(1)
2004–2005	Ukraine U19	15	(1)
2007	Ukraine U21	3	(0)
- * Club domestic league appearances and goals as of 31 May 2024

Vadym Ivanovych Milko (Ukrainian: Вадим Іванович Мілько; born 22 August 1986) is a Ukrainian retired professional footballer who played as a central midfielder.
