= Maksym Banasevych =

Ukrainian footballer (born 1995)

Personal information
- Full name: Maksym Valeriyovych Banasevych
- Date of birth: 31 January 1995 (age 31)
- Place of birth: Kyiv, Ukraine
- Height: 1.81 m (5 ft 11 1/2 in)
- Position: Midfielder

Youth career
- 200?–2008: FC Skhid Kyiv
- 2008–2010: Knyazha Schaslyve
- 2010: Youth Sportive School #15 Kyiv
- 2011: FC Obolon-Zmina Kyiv

Senior career*
Years	Team	Apps	(Gls)
2012	Obolon Kyiv	0	(0)
2012	→ Obolon-2 Kyiv	5	(0)
2013–2017	Zorya Luhansk	0	(0)
2016	→ Desna Chernihiv (loan)	11	(0)
2017–2019	Desna Chernihiv	49	(5)
2019	→ Kolos Kovalivka (loan)	10	(0)
2019	Rukh Lviv	6	(0)
2020	Metalist 1925 Kharkiv	11	(1)
2020–2021	Dinaz Vyshhorod	38	(3)
2022	Livyi Bereh Kyiv	0	(0)
2022	FC Continentals		

International career
2010	Ukraine U17	3	(2)
2013–2014	Ukraine U19	10	(1)
2014–2015	Ukraine U20	2	(0)
- * Club domestic league appearances and goals as of 10 May 2022

Maksym Valeriyovych Banasevych (Ukrainian: Максим Валерійович Банасевич; born 31 January 1995) is a Ukrainian professional footballer who plays as a midfielder.

== Career ==
=== Early career ===
Banasevych is a product of several different youth academies around Kyiv. He would sign his first professional contract with FC Obolon Kyiv in 2012. He primarily saw action in the Ukrainian Second League with Obolon's reserve squad. The following season, he was transferred to Zorya Luhansk due to the financial issues Obolon experienced after the season.

=== Desna Chernihiv ===
In his debut season with Zorya, he made two appearances in the 2014–15 Ukrainian Cup. After failing to break into the senior team, he was loaned out to Desna Chernihiv in the Ukrainian First League. He ultimately signed a permanent deal with Chernihiv after becoming a free agent in 2017. In his second season in the second tier, he made 18 appearances and recorded 3 goals. He helped Chernihiv secure promotion to the Ukrainian Premier League during his third season with the club. The following season, he re-signed with Chernihiv and debuted in the country's top tier.

=== First League ===
After making 11 appearances in the premier league he returned to the second tier by being loaned to Kolos Kovalivka. After the conclusion of the season, his contract with Desna was terminated. In 2019, he remained in the first league to sign with Rukh Lviv. His tenure with the western Ukrainian club was brief as he secured a move to Metalist 1925 Kharkiv. After a season in Kharkiv, his contract was terminated on mutual terms.

In 2020, he landed in the third tier by signing with Dinaz Vyshhorod in 2020. Following his two-year stint with Dinaz, he secured a deal with Livyi Bereh Kyiv.

=== Canada ===
In the summer of 2022, he played abroad in southern Ontario in the Canadian Soccer League with FC Continentals. Throughout the season, he helped the club secure a postseason berth by finishing fourth in the standings. He featured in the CSL Championship final, where the Continentals defeated Scarborough SC for the title.

== Honours ==
Dinaz Vyshhorod

- Ukrainian Second League: Runner-Up 2020–21

Rukh Lviv

- Ukrainian First League: 2019–20

Kolos Kovalivka

- Ukrainian First League: 2018–19

Desna Chernihiv

- Ukrainian First League: 2017–18

FC Continentals

- CSL Championship: 2022
