= Vladyslav Yemets =

Ukrainian footballer

Personal information
- Full name: Vladyslav Yevheniyovych Yemets
- Date of birth: 9 September 1997 (age 29)
- Place of birth: Kharkiv, Ukraine
- Height: 1.78 m (5 ft 10 in)
- Position: Defender

Team information
- Current team: Kolos Kovalivka
- Number: 29

Youth career
- 200?–2014: SCPC-1 Kharkiv

Senior career*
Years	Team	Apps	(Gls)
2015	Syla Derhachi (amateurs)	11	(0)
2015–2022	Zorya Luhansk	1	(0)
2018–2019	→ Avanhard Kramatorsk (loan)	54	(1)
2020	→ Kolos Kovalivka (loan)	18	(0)
2022–	Kolos Kovalivka	26	(0)
- * Club domestic league appearances and goals as of 20 June 2024

Vladyslav Yevheniyovych Yemets (Ukrainian: Владислав Євгенійович Ємець; born 9 September 1997) is a Ukrainian professional footballer who plays as a defender for Kolos Kovalivka.

== Career ==
Yemets is a product of the Kharkiv State College of Physical Culture 1 sportive school. He began his career in the amateur level, but in a short time was signed by the Ukrainian Premier League side FC Zorya Luhansk. However he only participated in the games for under 21 team and played on loan in the Ukrainian First League. In January 2020 he signed his next on loan contract with FC Kolos Kovalivka.
