= Yevheniy Morozko =

Ukrainian footballer

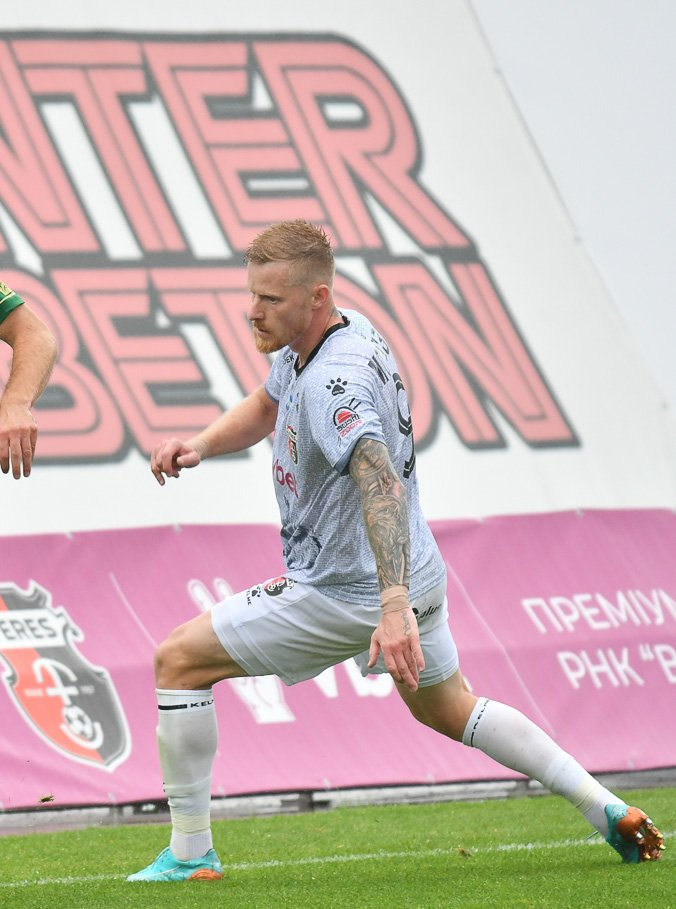

Personal information
- Full name: Yevheniy Heorhiyovych Morozko
- Date of birth: 15 February 1993 (age 33)
- Place of birth: Kyiv, Ukraine
- Height: 1.75 m (5 ft 9 in)
- Position: Midfielder

Team information
- Current team: FC Obolon Kyiv

Youth career
- 2004–2005: Vidradnyi Kyiv
- 2005–2008: Kyiv
- 2008–2009: Arsenal Kyiv
- 2009: Atlet Kyiv
- 2009–2011: Arsenal Kyiv

Senior career*
Years	Team	Apps	(Gls)
2011–2012	Arsenal Kyiv	0	(0)
2012–2013	Sevastopol-2	17	(0)
2013–2015	Dinaz Vyshhorod	0	(0)
2015–2022	Kolos Kovalivka	136	(18)
2021–2022	→ Polissya Zhytomyr (loan)	12	(0)
2022–2024	Polissya Zhytomyr	25	(1)
2024	→ Veres Rivne (loan)	11	(1)
2024	Veres Rivne	3	(0)
2025–2026	Kudrivka	23	(2)
2026-	Obolon Kyiv	4	(0)
- * Club domestic league appearances and goals as of 5 October 2026 @ 15:32(AEST)

Yevheniy Heorhiyovych Morozko (Ukrainian: Євгеній Георгійович Морозко; born 15 February 1993) is a Ukrainian professional footballer who plays as a midfielder.

== Career ==
Morozko is a product of the Kyiv's youth sportive schools. He began his career in the Ukrainian Premier League Reserves and Under 19 and amateur levels. Also spent one and a half seasons in the Ukrainian Second League with Sevastopol-2.

In March 2015 he signed his next contract with another amateur side FC Kolos Kovalivka. Morozko was promoted with the team to the third and second tiers of the Ukrainian football and made his debut in the Ukrainian Premier League for Kolos on 30 July 2019, playing as the start squad player in a winning home match against FC Mariupol. On 28 July 2025 he signed for Kudrivka in Ukrainian Premier League. On 26 July 2026, he left the club on mututal agreement.

== Honours ==
Polissya Zhytomyr

- Ukrainian First League: (1) 2022–23

Kolos Kovalivka

- Ukrainian Second Leagueː (1) 2015–16
- Kyiv Oblast Football Championshipː (2) 2013, 2014
- Football cup of Kyiv Oblastː (1) 2014
- Ukrainian First League Runners-up (1): 2018–19
