= Yevhen Zadoya =

Ukrainian footballer

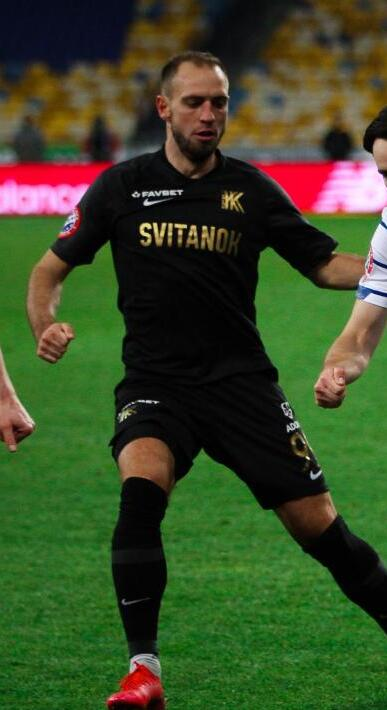

Personal information
- Full name: Yevhen Ihorovych Zadoya
- Date of birth: 5 January 1991 (age 35)
- Place of birth: Zaporizhzhia, Soviet Union (now Ukraine)
- Height: 1.77 m (5 ft 10 in)
- Position: Midfielder

Youth career
- 2004–2008: Metalurh Zaporizhzhia

Senior career*
Years	Team	Apps	(Gls)
2007–2013	Metalurh Zaporizhzhia	3	(0)
2007–2008	→ Metalurh-2 Zaporizhzhia	29	(0)
2011–2012	→ Helios Kharkiv (loan)	24	(0)
2013–2016	Helios Kharkiv	79	(2)
2016	Veres Rivne	0	(0)
2016–2021	Kolos Kovalivka	123	(10)
2022	Aksu	4	(0)
2022	Kolos Kovalivka	6	(0)
2023	Chornomorets Odesa	2	(0)
2023	Podillya Khmelnytskyi	15	(3)
2024	FSC Mariupol	23	(0)
2024–2026	Kalynivka	0	(0)
Total		308	(15)

International career
2007–2008	Ukraine U17	13	(0)
2008–2010	Ukraine U19	19	(0)
- * Club domestic league appearances and goals

Yevhen Ihorovych Zadoya (Ukrainian: Євген Ігорович Задоя; born 5 January 1991) is a retired Ukrainian professional footballer who played as a midfielder. He lasted played for FSC Mariupol.

== Career ==
Zadoya is a product of the FC Metalurh Zaporizhzhia football academy. After being promoted out of the club's academy in 2007, for a long time played he played for the club's reserve and under-21 teams.

In 2011 Zadoya was loaned away to one of the Kharkiv teams playing in Persha Liha and since then continues to play in that league. In a summer of 2016 he was listed for few games as a player of NK Veres Rivne, but never actually played a single minute for the club. After that transferred to FC Kolos Kovalivka.
