= Oleh Ilyin =

Ukrainian footballer

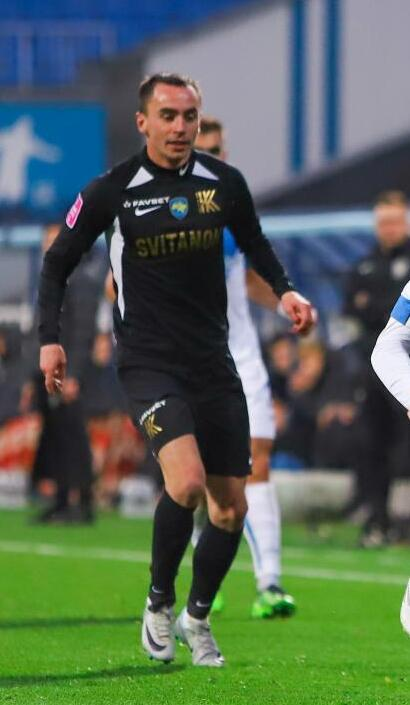

Personal information
- Full name: Oleh Andriyovych Ilyin
- Date of birth: 8 June 1997 (age 29)
- Place of birth: Odesa, Ukraine
- Height: 1.75 m (5 ft 9 in)
- Position: Midfielder

Team information
- Current team: Bukovyna Chernivtsi
- Number: 97

Youth career
- 2010–2014: Chornomorets Odesa
- 2015–2017: Dnipro

Senior career*
Years	Team	Apps	(Gls)
2017	Dnipro	22	(2)
2018–2025	Kolos Kovalivka	158	(15)
2025	→ Obolon Kyiv (loan)	22	(1)
2026–	Bukovyna Chernivtsi	0	(0)
- * Club domestic league appearances and goals as of 3 June 2026

Oleh Andriyovych Ilyin (Ukrainian: Олег Андрійович Ільїн; born 8 June 1997) is a Ukrainian professional footballer who plays as a midfielder for Bukovyna Chernivtsi.

== Career ==
Ilyin is a product of the FC Chornomorets Odesa and Dnipro Youth Sportive School systems. In June 2017 he was promoted to the main-team squad of FC Dnipro and made his debut for this team in the Ukrainian Second League.

In February 2018 he joined the Ukrainian First League side FC Kolos Kovalivka.
