= 2020–21 FC Kolos Kovalivka season =

FC Kolos Kovalivka
2020–21 season
- Chairman: Andriy Zasukha
- Head coach: Ruslan Kostyshyn
- Stadium: Kolos Stadium
- Ukrainian Premier League: 6th
- Ukrainian Cup: Quarterfinal
- UEFA Europa League: Third qualifying round
- Top goalscorer: League: Volodymyr Lysenko, Yevhen Seleznyov (5); All: Pavlo Orikhovskyi (7)
- Highest home attendance: 2,478 (vs Rukh Lviv, 27 February 2021)
- Lowest home attendance: 0
- Average home league attendance: 635
| Home colours | Away colours | Third colours |

The 2020–21 season was FC Kolos Kovalivka's 9th season in existence and the club's second consecutive season in the top flight of Ukrainian football. In addition to the domestic league, Kolos Kovalivka participated in this season's editions of the Ukrainian Cup and the UEFA Europa League. The season covers the period from August 2020 to 30 June 2021. After finishing the seaston on the 4th place in Premier League Kolos qualified to play in European competitions in season 2021–22.

== Players ==
=== Squad information ===
As of 30 June 2021

| Squad no. | Name | Nationality | Position | Date of birth (age) |
Goalkeepers
| 25 | Yevhen Volynets | (Ukraine) | GK | 26 August 1993 (aged 27) |
| 31 | Vladyslav Kucheruk ^{List B} (on loan from Dynamo Kyiv) | (Ukraine) | MF | 14 February 1999 (aged 22) |
| 71 | Yevhen Kucherenko ^{List B} | (Ukraine) | GK | 27 August 1999 (aged 21) |
Defenders
| 2 | Matija Rom | (Slovenia) | DF | 1 November 1998 (aged 22) |
| 3 | Illya Kovalenko ^{List B} | (Ukraine) | DF | 23 July 2001 (aged 19) |
| 5 | Kyrylo Petrov | (Ukraine) | DF | 22 June 1990 (aged 31) |
| 13 | Vitaliy Havrysh (Captain) | (Ukraine) | DF | 18 March 1986 (aged 35) |
| 15 | Oleksandr Chornomorets | (Ukraine) | DF | 5 April 1993 (aged 28) |
| 21 | Yevhen Novak | (Ukraine) | DF | 1 February 1989 (aged 32) |
| 24 | Oleksiy Zozulya | (Ukraine) | DF | 15 April 1992 (aged 29) |
| | Yevhen Kostyuk | (Ukraine) | DF | 28 January 2002 (aged 19) |
Midfielders
| 8 | Yevhen Smyrnyi ^{List B} (on loan from Dynamo Kyiv) | (Ukraine) | MF | 18 August 1998 (aged 22) |
| 9 | Denys Antyukh | (Ukraine) | MF | 21 February 1997 (aged 24) |
| 10 | Yevhen Morozko | (Ukraine) | MF | 15 February 1993 (aged 28) |
| 14 | Vadym Milko | (Ukraine) | MF | 22 August 1986 (aged 34) |
| 18 | Denys Kostyshyn | (Ukraine) | MF | 31 August 1997 (aged 23) |
| 20 | Vyacheslav Churko (on loan from Shakhtar Donetsk) | (Ukraine) | MF | 10 May 1993 (aged 28) |
| 23 | Mykyta Kravchenko ^{List B} (on loan from Dynamo Kyiv) | (Ukraine) | MF | 14 June 1997 (aged 24) |
| 30 | Anton Salabay ^{List B} | (Ukraine) | MF | 12 June 2002 (aged 19) |
| 35 | Nikolay Zolotov | (Belarus) | MF | 11 November 1994 (aged 26) |
| 38 | Alvaro Ngamba | (Cameroon) | MF | 15 December 1998 (aged 22) |
| 48 | Pavlo Orikhovskyi | (Ukraine) | MF | 13 May 1996 (aged 25) |
| 69 | Oleh Ilyin | (Ukraine) | MF | 8 June 1997 (aged 24) |
| 70 | Stanislav Morarenko ^{List B} | (Ukraine) | MF | 3 August 2001 (aged 19) |
| 77 | Stanislav Sorokin ^{List B} | (Ukraine) | MF | 3 May 2000 (aged 21) |
| 90 | Andriy Bohdanov | (Ukraine) | MF | 21 January 1990 (aged 31) |
| 94 | Mamadou Danfa ^{List B} | (Senegal) | MF | 6 March 2001 (aged 20) |
| 99 | Yevhen Zadoya | (Ukraine) | MF | 5 January 1991 (aged 30) |
Forwards
| 7 | Volodymyr Lysenko | (Ukraine) | FW | 20 April 1988 (aged 33) |
| 11 | Yevhen Seleznyov | (Ukraine) | FW | 20 July 1985 (aged 35) |
| 17 | Dmytro Khlyobas | (Ukraine) | FW | 9 May 1994 (aged 27) |
| 19 | Yevhen Isayenko ^{List B} (on loan from Dynamo Kyiv) | (Ukraine) | FW | 7 August 2000 (aged 20) |
| 27 | Kyrylo Senko ^{List B} | (Ukraine) | FW | 19 November 2002 (aged 18) |

== Transfers ==
=== In ===
| Date | Pos. | Player | Age | Moving from | Type | Fee | Source |
Summer
| 4 August 2020 | DF | (Ukraine) Yevhen Novak | 31 | (North Macedonia) Vardar | Transfer | Free | |
| 2 September 2020 | FW | (Ukraine) Yevhen Seleznyov | 35 | (Turkey) Bursaspor | Transfer | Free | |
| 1 December 2020 | DF | (Slovenia) Matija Rom | 22 | Unattached | Transfer | Free | |
| 31 July 2020 | MF | (Ukraine) Arsentiy Doroshenko | 20 | (Ukraine) Podillya Khmelnytskyi | Loan return | | |
| 4 August 2020 | DF | (Ukraine) Mykyta Kravchenko | 23 | (Ukraine) Dynamo Kyiv | Loan | | |
| 1 September 2020 | GK | (Ukraine) Vladyslav Kucheruk | 21 | (Ukraine) Dynamo Kyiv | Loan | | |
| 1 September 2020 | FW | (Ukraine) Yevhen Isayenko | 20 | (Ukraine) Dynamo Kyiv | Loan | | |
Winter
| 8 January 2021 | FW | (Ukraine) Dmytro Khlyobas | 26 | (Ukraine) Desna Chernihiv | Transfer | Free | |
| 12 January 2021 | MF | (Cameroon) Alvaro Ngamba | 22 | (Ukraine) Podillya Khmelnytskyi | Transfer | Undisclosed | |
| 14 January 2021 | DF | (Ukraine) Yevhen Kostyuk | 18 | (Ukraine) Nyva Vinnytsia | Transfer | Undisclosed | |
| 5 February 2021 | DF | (Belarus) Nikolay Zolotov | 26 | (Russia) Ural Yekaterinburg | Transfer | Free | |
| 31 December 2020 | GK | (Ukraine) Anton Yashkov | 28 | (Ukraine) Polissya Zhytomyr | Loan return | | |
| 31 December 2020 | MF | (Ukraine) Oleksandr Bondarenko | 31 | (Ukraine) Volyn Lutsk | Loan return | | |
| 31 December 2020 | MF | (Ukraine) Oleksiy Lobov | 23 | (Ukraine) Avanhard Kramatorsk | Loan return | | |
| 31 December 2020 | MF | (Ukraine) Stanislav Sorokin | 20 | (Ukraine) Kremin Kremenchuk | Loan return | | |
| 5 February 2021 | MF | (Ukraine) Vyacheslav Churko | 27 | (Ukraine) Shakhtar Donetsk | Loan | | |

=== Out ===
| Date | Pos. | Player | Age | Moving to | Type | Fee | Source |
Summer
| 12 August 2020 | DF | (Ukraine) Yevhen Yefremov | 26 | (Lithuania) Sūduva Marijampolė | Transfer | Undisclosed | |
| 20 August 2020 | DF | (Ukraine) Vadym Paramonov | 29 | (Ukraine) Rukh Lviv | Transfer | Undisclosed | |
| 28 August 2020 | MF | (Latvia) Vladislavs Soloveičiks | 21 | (Latvia) Jelgava | Transfer | Undisclosed | |
| 28 August 2020 | MF | (Ukraine) Stanislav Sorokin | 20 | (Ukraine) Kremin Kremenchuk | Transfer | Undisclosed | |
| 2 September 2020 | MF | (Ukraine) Arsentiy Doroshenko | 20 | (Ukraine) Avanhard Kramatorsk | Transfer | Undisclosed | |
| 4 September 2020 | FW | (Iceland) Árni Vilhjálmsson | 26 | Unattached | Transfer | Free | |
| 31 July 2020 | FW | (Ukraine) Oleh Kozhushko | 22 | (Ukraine) SC Dnipro-1 | Loan return | | |
| 31 July 2020 | MF | (Ukraine) Oleksandr Volkov | 31 | (Ukraine) Desna Chernihiv | Loan return | | |
| 4 September 2020 | MF | (Ukraine) Oleksandr Bondarenko | 31 | (Ukraine) Volyn Lutsk | Loan | | |
| 8 September 2020 | GK | (Ukraine) Anton Yashkov | 28 | (Ukraine) Polissya Zhytomyr | Loan | | |
Summer
| 1 January 2021 | MF | (Ukraine) Oleksandr Bondarenko | 31 | Unattached | Transfer | Free | |
| 5 January 2021 | MF | (Ukraine) Oleksiy Lobov | 23 | (Ukraine) Obolon Kyiv | Transfer | Undisclosed | |
| 19 January 2021 | DF | (Ukraine) Maksym Maksymenko | 30 | (Greece) AEL Larissa | Transfer | Undisclosed | |
| 5 February 2021 | GK | (Ukraine) Anton Yashkov | 28 | (Ukraine) Polissya Zhytomyr | Transfer | Free | |
| 31 December 2020 | DF | (Ukraine) Vladyslav Yemets | 23 | (Ukraine) Zorya Luhansk | Loan return | | |
| 19 February 2021 | FW | (Ukraine) Stanislav Koval | 18 | (Ukraine) Polissya Zhytomyr | Loan | | |

== Pre-season and friendlies ==
Win Draw Loss

| 29 August 2020 Friendly | Kolos Kovalivka (Ukraine) | 3–1 | (Ukraine) Olimpik Donetsk | Kovalivka |
| 18:00 EEST (UTC+03:00) | Seleznyov 50'; Novak 55'; Antyukh 79' | Report | Kirilenko 74' | Stadium: Kolos training facility |

| 4 September 2020 Friendly | Kolos Kovalivka (Ukraine) | 3–1 | (Ukraine) Obolon Kyiv | Kyiv |
| EEST (UTC+03:00) | Isayenko; Orikhovskyi | Report | Goal | Stadium: Bannikov Stadium |

| 17 January 2021 Friendly | Kolos Kovalivka (Ukraine) | 1–0 | (Serbia) Proleter Novi Sad | Antalya, Turkey |
| 17:00 EET (UTC+02:00) | Orikhovskyi 89' (pen.) | Report | | Stadium: Miracle Sport Center |

| 23 January 2021 Friendly | Kolos Kovalivka (Ukraine) | 2–1 | (North Macedonia) Sileks Kratovo | Antalya, Turkey |
| 16:30 EET (UTC+02:00) | Lysenko 64'; Milko 80' | Report | 48' |

| 24 January 2021 Friendly | Kolos Kovalivka (Ukraine) | 2–0 | (Serbia) Voždovac | Antalya, Turkey |
| 18:00 EET (UTC+02:00) | Sorokin 54', 89' (pen.) | Report |

| 28 January 2021 Friendly | Kolos Kovalivka (Ukraine) | 2–3 | (Slovenia) Maribor | Turkey |
| 17:30 EET (UTC+02:00) | Orikhovskyi 6'; Seleznyov 75' (pen.) | Report | Bajde 27', 36' (pen.); Martinović 40' |

| 29 January 2021 Friendly | Kolos Kovalivka (Ukraine) | 1–1 | (Georgia (country)) Dinamo Tbilisi | Turkey |
| 17:30 EET (UTC+02:00) | Orikhovskyi 90+3' | Report | Sporkslede 18' |

| 31 January 2021 Friendly | Kolos Kovalivka (Ukraine) | 2–2 | (Belarus) Rukh Brest | Turkey |
| 16:30 EET (UTC+02:00) | Lysenko 13' (pen.); Milko 48' | Report | Savitski 17'; Bakaj 23' |

| 2 February 2021 Friendly | Kolos Kovalivka (Ukraine) | 3–2 | (Kazakhstan) Atyrau | Turkey |
| 16:30 EET (UTC+02:00) | Havrysh 49'; Orikhovskyi 60', 90' (pen.) | Report | Grzelczak 7'; Dzhumatov 68' |

| 28 March 2021 Friendly | Kolos Kovalivka (Ukraine) | 3–0 | (Ukraine) Juniors Shpytki | Kovalivka |
| 11:00 EEST (UTC+03:00) | Havrysh; Ilyin; Khlyobas | Report | | Stadium: Kolos training facility |

== Competitions ==
=== Overview ===
| Competition | First match | Last match | Starting round | Final position | Record | | | | | | | |
| Competition | First match | Last match | Starting round | Final position | Pld | W | D | L | GF | GA | GD | Win % |
|---|---|---|---|---|---|---|---|---|---|---|---|---|
| Ukrainian Premier League | 21 August 2020 | 9 May 2021 | Matchday 1 | 4th | 26 | 10 | 11 | 5 | 36 | 26 | +10 | 38.46 |
| Ukrainian Cup | 30 September 2020 | 3 March 2021 | Round of 32 (1/16) | Quarterfinal | 3 | 2 | 1 | 0 | 5 | 0 | +5 | 66.67 |
| Europa League | 17 September 2020 | 24 September 2020 | Second qualifying round | Third qualifying round | 2 | 1 | 0 | 1 | 2 | 3 | −1 | 50.00 |
| Total | | | | | 31 | 13 | 12 | 6 | 43 | 29 | +14 | 41.94 |

Last updated: 9 May 2021
Source: Competitions

=== Ukrainian Premier League ===
==== League table ====
| Pos | Team | Pld | W | D | L | GF | GA | GD | Pts | Qualification or relegation |
|---|---|---|---|---|---|---|---|---|---|---|
| 2 | Shakhtar Donetsk | 26 | 16 | 6 | 4 | 54 | 19 | +35 | 54 | Qualification for the Champions League third qualifying round |
| 3 | Zorya Luhansk | 26 | 15 | 5 | 6 | 44 | 22 | +22 | 50 | Qualification for the Europa League play-off round |
| 4 | Kolos Kovalivka | 26 | 10 | 11 | 5 | 36 | 26 | +10 | 41 | Qualification for the Europa Conference League third qualifying round |
| 5 | Vorskla Poltava | 26 | 11 | 8 | 7 | 37 | 30 | +7 | 41 | Qualification for the Europa Conference League second qualifying round |
| 6 | Desna Chernihiv | 26 | 10 | 8 | 8 | 38 | 32 | +6 | 38 | |

Source: Ukrainian Premier League
Rules for classification: 1) Points; 2) Head-to-head points; 3) Head-to-head goal difference; 4) Head-to-head higher number of goals scored; 5) Goal difference; 6) Higher number of goals scored; 7) Draw or "Golden match" if two teams tied for title (Article 22, paragraph 3).

==== Results summary ====
| Overall | | | | | | | | Home | | | | | | Away | | | | | |
| Pld | W | D | L | GF | GA | GD | Pts | W | D | L | GF | GA | GD | W | D | L | GF | GA | GD |
|---|---|---|---|---|---|---|---|---|---|---|---|---|---|---|---|---|---|---|---|
| 26 | 10 | 11 | 5 | 36 | 26 | +10 | 41 | 4 | 6 | 3 | 16 | 12 | +4 | 6 | 5 | 2 | 20 | 14 | +6 |

Last updated: 9 May 2021.

==== Results by round ====
| Round | 1 | 2 | 3 | 4 | 5 | 6 | 7 | 8 | 9 | 10 | 11 | 12 | 13 | 14 | 15 | 16 | 17 | 18 | 19 | 20 | 21 | 22 | 23 | 24 | 25 | 26 |
|---|---|---|---|---|---|---|---|---|---|---|---|---|---|---|---|---|---|---|---|---|---|---|---|---|---|---|
| Ground | A | H | A | H | H | A | H | H | A | A | H | H | A | H | A | H | A | A | H | A | A | H | H | A | A | H |
| Result | L | W | W | D | W | D | D | L | W | L | D | D | D | D | W | L | D | W | W | D | W | D | W | D | W | L |
| Position | 11 | 8 | 3 | 5 | 3 | 4 | 5 | 6 | 5 | 5 | 5 | 6 | 6 | 7 | 7 | 7 | 7 | 6 | 6 | 6 | 6 | 6 | 4 | 4 | 4 | 4 |

Updated to match(es) played on 9 May 2021. Source:
A = Away; H = Home; W = Win; D = Draw; L = Loss

==== Matches ====
| 21 August 2020 1 | Shakhtar Donetsk | 3–1 | Kolos Kovalivka | Kyiv |
| 19:00 EEST (UTC+03:00) | Alan Patrick 60' (pen.), 69'; Volynets 72' (o.g.) | Report | Yemets (yellow card) 31'; Volynets (yellow card) 45'; Zadoya (yellow card) 52'; Maksymenko (yellow card) 59'; Bondarenko (yellow card) 60'; Kostyshyn 77' | Stadium: NSC Olimpiyskiy; Attendance: 0 Referee: Ihor Paskhal |
Note: Match was played behind closed doors due to quarantine in Ukraine during COVID-19 pandemic.

| 12 September 2020 2 | Kolos Kovalivka | 4–0 | FC Lviv | Kovalivka |
| 17:00 EEST (UTC+03:00) | Lysenko 28', 47'; Antyukh (yellow card) 33'; Havrysh 69'; Zadoya (yellow card) 79'; Novak (yellow card) 84'; Isayenko 90+4' | Report | Bohunov (yellow card) 32'; Mihoubi (yellow card) 58'; Hrysyo (yellow card) 87' | Stadium: Kolos Stadium; Attendance: 1,261; Referee: Yaroslav Kozyk |

| 20 September 2020 3 | Rukh Lviv | 1–2 | Kolos Kovalivka | Lviv |
| 19:30 EEST (UTC+03:00) | Stamenković (yellow card) 29'; Zastavnyi (yellow card) 62'; Rusyn 90+4'; Kukharevych (yellow card) 90+7' | Report | Morozko 4', 20'; Milko (yellow card) 10'; Orikhovskyi (yellow card) 73'; Chornomorets (yellow card) 90'; Havrysh (yellow card) 90+4'; Kostyshyn (yellow card) 90+5' | Stadium: Arena Lviv; Attendance: 2,952; Referee: Dmytro Bondarenko |

| 27 September 2020 4 | Kolos Kovalivka | 0–0 | Inhulets Petrove | Kovalivka |
| 19:30 EEST (UTC+03:00) | Seleznyov (yellow card) 20' | Report | Lupashko (yellow card) 83'; Kvasnyi (yellow card) 85' | Stadium: Kolos Stadium; Attendance: 1,248; Referee: Oleksandr Derdo |

| 3 October 2020 5 | Kolos Kovalivka | 1–0 | FC Mariupol | Kovalivka |
| 19:30 EEST (UTC+03:00) | Petrov (yellow card) 30'; Orikhovskyi 90+4' (pen.) | Report | Chekh (yellow card) 40' | Stadium: Kolos Stadium; Attendance: 1,256; Referee: Viktor Kopiyevskyi |

| 17 October 2020 6 | Zorya Luhansk | 1–1 | Kolos Kovalivka | Zaporizhia |
| 19:30 EEST (UTC+03:00) | Favorov (yellow card) 29'; Kocherhin 44'; Abu Hanna (yellow card) 44'; Yurchenko (yellow card) 46' (yellow-red card) 90+2'; Cvek (yellow card) 59' | Report | Seleznyov 90+3' (pen.) | Stadium: Slavutych-Arena; Attendance: 0 Referee: Anatoliy Abdula |
Note: Match was played behind closed doors due to quarantine in Ukraine during COVID-19 pandemic.

| 25 October 2020 7 | Kolos Kovalivka | 2–2 | FC Mynai | Kovalivka |
| 17:00 EET (UTC+02:00) | Milko 19', (yellow card) 40'; Lysenko (yellow card) 31'; Danfa 63'; Ilyin (yellow card) 77'; Seleznyov (yellow card) 79'; Kravchenko (yellow card) 82' | Report | Nuriyev 17' (pen.), (yellow card) 86'; Matić (yellow card) 28'; Shynder 62', (yellow card) 77'; Knysh (yellow card) 74'; Mayembe (yellow card) 84' | Stadium: Kolos Stadium; Attendance: 0 Referee: Oleksandr Shandor |
Note: Match was played behind closed doors due to quarantine in Ukraine during COVID-19 pandemic.

| 31 October 2020 8 | Kolos Kovalivka | 1–2 | Olimpik Donetsk | Kovalivka |
| 14:00 EET (UTC+02:00) | Zadoya (yellow card) 8'; Danfa (yellow card) 25'; Havrysh (yellow card) 61'; Ilyin (yellow card) 65'; Seleznyov 86' (pen.) | Report | Benito (yellow card) 15', (goal) 17'; Babenko (yellow card) 20'; Zahedi 62' (pen.); Dramé (yellow card) 64'; Politylo (yellow card) 74' | Stadium: Kolos Stadium; Attendance: 0 Referee: Maksym Kozyryatskyi |
Note: Match was played behind closed doors due to quarantine in Ukraine during COVID-19 pandemic.

| 6 November 2020 9 | SC Dnipro-1 | 0–2 | Kolos Kovalivka | Dnipro |
| 19:00 EET (UTC+02:00) | Lohinov (yellow card) 24'; Kohut (yellow card) 26'; Khoblenko (yellow card) 30' | Report | Petrov (yellow card) 20'; Seleznyov 25' (pen.); Smyrnyi (yellow card) 39', (goal) 58'; Kravchenko (yellow card) 85'; Ilyin (yellow card) 90' | Stadium: Dnipro-Arena; Attendance: 0 Referee: Viktor Kopiyevskyi |
Note: Match was played behind closed doors due to quarantine in Ukraine during COVID-19 pandemic.

| 22 November 2020 10 | Vorskla Poltava | 3–0 | Kolos Kovalivka | Poltava |
| 19:30 EET (UTC+02:00) | Sklyar 31', (yellow card) 78'; Puclin (yellow card) 52'; Chesnakov (yellow card) 55'; Shcherbak 58'; Yavorskyi 65' | Report | Havrysh (yellow card) 14'; Novak (yellow card) 19'; Lysenko (yellow card) 38'; Petrov (yellow card) 64'; Zozulya (yellow card) 76' | Stadium: Vorskla Stadium; Attendance: 0 Referee: Dmytro Kryvushkin |
Note: Match was played behind closed doors due to quarantine in Ukraine during COVID-19 pandemic.

| 29 November 2020 11 | Kolos Kovalivka | 1–1 | Desna Chernihiv | Kovalivka |
| 17:00 EET (UTC+02:00) | Lysenko 12' (pen.); Smyrnyi (yellow card) 24'; Bohdanov (yellow card) 67' | Report | Budkivskyi 27' (pen.); Imerekov (yellow card) 56' (yellow-red card) 90+5'; Konoplya (yellow card) 67'; Mostovyi (yellow card) 88'; Tamm (yellow card) 90+4' | Stadium: Kolos Stadium; Attendance: 0 Referee: Vitaliy Romanov |
Note: Match was played behind closed doors due to quarantine in Ukraine during COVID-19 pandemic.

| 6 December 2020 12 | Kolos Kovalivka | 1–1 | FC Oleksandriya | Kovalivka |
| 19:30 EET (UTC+02:00) | Seleznyov (yellow card) 8', (goal) 26' (pen.); Antyukh (yellow card) 83' | Report | Hrechyshkin (yellow card) 16'; Pashayev (yellow card) 52'; Shastal 54'; Myshenko (yellow card) 57'; Babohlo (yellow card) 69' | Stadium: Kolos Stadium; Attendance: 0 Referee: Yuriy Mozharovskyi |
Note: Match was played behind closed doors due to quarantine in Ukraine during COVID-19 pandemic.

| 12 December 2020 13 | Dynamo Kyiv | 2–2 | Kolos Kovalivka | Kyiv |
| 17:00 EET (UTC+02:00) | Mykolenko (yellow card) 48'; Shepelyev (red card) 53'; Shaparenko (yellow card) 62'; Tsyhankov 74' (pen.), 84'; Boyko (yellow card) 90+3' | Report | Kostyshyn (yellow card) 27'; Seleznyov (yellow card) 31', (goal) 48' (pen.); Ilyin (yellow card) 50'; Chornomorets (yellow card) 67'; Milko (yellow card) 68'; Maksymenko (red card) 73'; Antyukh 88'; Volynets (yellow card) 89' | Stadium: Dynamo Stadium; Attendance: 0 Referee: Ihor Paskhal |
Note: Match was played behind closed doors due to quarantine in Ukraine during COVID-19 pandemic.

| 14 February 2021 14 | Kolos Kovalivka | 0–0 | Shakhtar Donetsk | Kyiv |
| 14:00 EET (UTC+02:00) | Petrov (yellow card) 31'; Antyukh (yellow card) 44'; Bohdanov (yellow card) 60'; Chornomorets (yellow card) 64'; Kostyshyn (yellow card) 87'; Kravchenko (yellow card) 89' | Report | | Stadium: Dynamo Stadium; Attendance: 0 Referee: Ihor Paskhal |
Note: Match was played behind closed doors due to quarantine in Ukraine during COVID-19 pandemic.

| 20 February 2021 15 | FC Lviv | 0–2 | Kolos Kovalivka | Lviv |
| 19:30 EET (UTC+02:00) | Alvaro (yellow card) 21'; Mahmutovic (yellow card) 64'; Nych (yellow card) 66'; Hrysyo (yellow card) 79' | Report | Orikhovskyi 33', 74' (pen.); Churko (yellow card) 45+5'; Ilyin (yellow card) 78'; Lysenko (yellow card) 88' | Stadium: Arena Lviv; Attendance: 573; Referee: Viktor Kopiyevskyi |

| 27 February 2021 16 | Kolos Kovalivka | 1–2 | Rukh Lviv | Kovalivka |
| 19:30 EET (UTC+02:00) | Zadoya (yellow card) 12'; Mysak 34' (o.g.); Kostyshyn (yellow card) 86' (yellow-red card) 90+1' | Report | Zec (yellow card) 22'; Bilyi (yellow card) 35'; Kondrakov 48'; Mysyk (yellow card) 63' (yellow-red card) 89'; Kukharevych 90+6' | Stadium: Kolos Stadium; Attendance: 2,478; Referee: Oleksandr Omelchenko |

| 7 March 2021 17 | Inhulets Petrove | 0–0 | Kolos Kovalivka | Kropyvnytskyi |
| 19:30 EET (UTC+02:00) | Kovalenko (yellow card) 15'; Zaporozhets (yellow card) 59'; Kozak (yellow card) 69' | Report | Churko (yellow card) 3'; Orikhovskyi (yellow card) 25' | Stadium: Zirka Stadium; Attendance: 148; Referee: Oleksandr Derdo |

| 14 March 2021 18 | FC Mariupol | 1–4 | Kolos Kovalivka | Kovalivka |
| 14:00 EET (UTC+02:00) | Kulakov (yellow card) 41'; Bondarenko 45+1'; Chobotenko (yellow card) 58' | Report | Churko 5'; Kostyshyn 29'; Novak 48'; Lysenko 61'; Ngamba (yellow card) 75'; Antyukh (yellow card) 90+1'; Zolotov (yellow card) 90+3' | Stadium: Kolos Stadium; Attendance: 2,348; Referee: Oleksandr Shandor |

| 21 March 2021 19 | Kolos Kovalivka | 1–0 | Zorya Luhansk | Kovalivka |
| 19:30 EET (UTC+02:00) | Kostyshyn (yellow card) 38'; Lysenko 42'; Zolotov (yellow card) 61'; Volynets (yellow card) 90+3'; Smyrnyi (yellow card) 90+3' | Report | Kocherhin (yellow card) 35'; Nazaryna (yellow card) 50'; Sayyadmanesh (yellow card) 86' | Stadium: Kolos Stadium; Attendance: 0 Referee: Dmytro Kryvushkin |
Note: Match was played behind closed doors due to quarantine in Ukraine during COVID-19 pandemic.

| 4 April 2021 20 | FC Mynai | 0–0 | Kolos Kovalivka | Uzhhorod |
| 14:00 EEST (UTC+03:00) | Nuriyev (yellow card) 69'; Oduenyi (yellow card) 86' | Report | Ilyin (yellow card) 29'; Petrov (yellow card) 49'; Danfa (yellow card) 79' | Stadium: Avanhard Stadium; Attendance: 0 Referee: Dmytro Bondarenko |
Note: Match was played behind closed doors due to quarantine in Ukraine during COVID-19 pandemic.

| 11 April 2021 21 | Olimpik Donetsk | 1–2 | Kolos Kovalivka | Kovalivka |
| 19:30 EEST (UTC+03:00) | Benito (yellow card) 22'; Kargbo 30'; Ekra (yellow card) 50' (yellow-red card) 56'; Babenko (yellow card) 60'; Nkeng (yellow card) 65'; Kychak (yellow card) 84' | Report | Zolotov (yellow card) 42'; Kostyshyn 68' (pen.); Antyukh (yellow card) 78'; Milko 87' | Stadium: Kolos Stadium; Attendance: 0 Referee: Oleksandr Derdo |
Note: Match was played behind closed doors due to quarantine in Ukraine during COVID-19 pandemic.

| 18 April 2021 22 | Kolos Kovalivka | 1–1 | SC Dnipro-1 | Kovalivka |
| 19:30 EEST (UTC+03:00) | Milko 27'; Lysenko (yellow card) 62'; Churko (yellow card) 67'; Zolotov (yellow card) 70'; Havrysh (yellow card) 86' | Report | Ćuže 43'; Ihnatenko (yellow card) 75' | Stadium: Kolos Stadium; Attendance: 0 Referee: Maksym Kozyryatskyi |
Note: Match was played behind closed doors due to quarantine in Ukraine during COVID-19 pandemic.

| 24 April 2021 23 | Kolos Kovalivka | 3–0 | Vorskla Poltava | Kovalivka |
| 17:00 EEST (UTC+03:00) | Kostyshyn (yellow card) 24', (goal) 47'; Churko 66'; Smyrnyi 87' | Report | Sklyar (yellow card) 37'; Yavorskyi (yellow card) 65'; Ndiaye (yellow card) 84' | Stadium: Kolos Stadium; Attendance: 0 Referee: Ihor Paskhal |
Note: Match was played behind closed doors due to quarantine in Ukraine during COVID-19 pandemic.

| 1 May 2021 24 | Desna Chernihiv | 2–2 | Kolos Kovalivka | Chernihiv |
| 14:00 EEST (UTC+03:00) | Konoplya (yellow card) 45+1'; Ohirya (yellow card) 47' (yellow-red card) 66'; Kalitvintsev 59'; Kartushov 84' | Report | Bohdanov (yellow card) 27'; Petrov 30', (yellow card) 47'; Churko 53', (yellow card) 63'; Chornomorets (yellow card) 58'; Kucheruk (yellow card) 81' | Stadium: Chernihiv Stadium; Attendance: 0 Referee: Yuriy Ivanov |
Note: Match was played behind closed doors due to quarantine in Ukraine during COVID-19 pandemic.

| 5 May 2021 25 | FC Oleksandriya | 0–2 | Kolos Kovalivka | Oleksandriya |
| 19:00 EET (UTC+02:00) | Shastal (yellow card) 23'; Dryshlyuk (yellow card) 44'; Ustymenko (yellow card) 45'; Stetskov (yellow card) 55'; Banada (yellow card) 66'; Bondarenko (yellow card) 90+3' | Report | Petrov 42' (pen.); Milko (yellow card) 49'; Orikhovskyi 57', (yellow card) 60'; Bohdanov (yellow card) 66' | Stadium: CSC Nika Stadium; Attendance: 630; Referee: Oleksandr Shandor |

| 9 May 2021 26 | Kolos Kovalivka | 0–3 | Dynamo Kyiv | Kovalivka |
| 14:00 EEST (UTC+03:00) | Havrysh (yellow card) 56'; Ngamba (yellow card) 66'; Zolotov (yellow card) 87' | Report | Sydorchuk (yellow card) 44'; Harmash 45'; Shaparenko 57'; Mykolenko 64'; Popov (yellow card) 87' | Stadium: Kolos Stadium; Attendance: 2,463; Referee: Oleksandr Omelchenko |

=== Ukrainian Cup ===
| 30 September 2020 Round of 32 (1/16) | Prykarpattia Ivano-Frankivsk | 0–1 | Kolos Kovalivka | Ivano-Frankivsk |
| 17:30 EEST (UTC+03:00) | Vorobchak (yellow card) 18'; Sikach (yellow card) 89' | Report | Kostyshyn (yellow card) 41'; Bohdanov (yellow card) 45+1'; Ilyin (yellow card) 47'; Orikhovskyi 89' (pen.) | Stadium: MCS Rukh; Attendance: 1,100; Referee: Oleksandr Shandor |

| 2 December 2020 Round of 16 (1/8) | Nyva Vinnytsia | 0–4 | Kolos Kovalivka | Vinnytsia |
| 13:00 EEST (UTC+03:00) | Pidopryhora (yellow card) 22'; Hromok (yellow card) 76'; Osmolovskyi (yellow card) 82' | Report | Chornomorets (yellow card) 29'; Orikhovskyi 40', 67'; Koval (yellow card) 72', (goal) 90+1'; Morarenko (yellow card) 81'; Kostyshyn 83' (pen.) | Stadium: Tsentralnyi Stadion; Attendance: 0 Referee: Oleksandr Shandor |
Note: Match was played behind closed doors due to quarantine in Ukraine during COVID-19 pandemic.

| 3 March 2021 Quarter-final | Dynamo Kyiv | 0–0 (4 – 3 p) | Kolos Kovalivka | Kyiv |
| 17:00 EET (UTC+02:00) | de Pena (yellow card) 63'; Rodrigues (yellow card) 75' | Report | Zolotov (yellow card) 54'; Kostyshyn (yellow card) 72'; Bohdanov (yellow card) 90+2'; Chornomorets (yellow card) 100' | Stadium: NSC Olimpiyskiy; Attendance: 3,421; Referee: Denys Shurman |
| | Penalties |
| | Shaparenko (penalty scored); Supriaha (penalty scored); Rodrigues (penalty scored); Lyednyev (penalty missed); Karavayev (penalty missed); Andriyevskyi (penalty scored) | | Orikhovskyi (penalty scored); Petrov (penalty scored); Milko (penalty scored); Zadoya (penalty missed); Havrysh (penalty missed); Ilyin (penalty missed) |

=== UEFA Europa League ===
| 17 September 2020 2Q | Aris Thessaloniki (Greece) | 1–2 | (Ukraine) Kolos Kovalivka | Thessaloniki, Greece |
| 21:00 EEST (UTC+03:00) | Bruno Gama 55', (yellow card) 57'; Rose (yellow card) 68' | Report | Bohdanov (yellow card) 35'; Zadoya (yellow card) 37'; Novak 47'; Antyukh 63'; Morozko (yellow card) 76'; Havrysh (yellow card) 86' | Stadium: Kleanthis Vikelidis Stadium; Attendance: 0 Referee: Lionel Tschudi |

| 24 September 2020 3Q | Rijeka (Croatia) | 2–0 | (Ukraine) Kolos Kovalivka | Rijeka, Croatia |
| 21:45 EEST (UTC+03:00) | Escoval 102'; Raspopović (yellow card) 105'; Kulenović (yellow card) 105+2'; Smolčić (yellow card) 107'; Andrijašević 115'; Lepinjica (yellow card) 120+2' | Report | Kravchenko (yellow card) 3'; Zadoya (yellow card) 37'; Bohdanov (yellow card) 105+3' | Stadium: Stadion Rujevica; Attendance: 0 Referee: Tiago Martins |

== Statistics ==
=== Appearances and goals ===
| No. | Pos | Nat | Player | Total | | Premier League | | Cup | | EL | |
| No. | Pos | Nat | Player | Apps | Goals | Apps | Goals | Apps | Goals | Apps | Goals |
Goalkeepers
| 25 | GK | (Ukraine) UKR | Yevhen Volynets | 23 | 0 | 20 | 0 | 1 | 0 | 2 | 0 |
| 31 | GK | (Ukraine) UKR | Vladyslav Kucheruk | 8 | 0 | 6 | 0 | 2 | 0 | 0 | 0 |
Defenders
| 2 | DF | (Slovenia) SLO | Matija Rom | 2 | 0 | 1 | 0 | 1 | 0 | 0 | 0 |
| 5 | DF | (Ukraine) UKR | Kyrylo Petrov | 25 | 2 | 19+1 | 2 | 3 | 0 | 2 | 0 |
| 13 | DF | (Ukraine) UKR | Vitaliy Havrysh | 21 | 1 | 18 | 1 | 1 | 0 | 2 | 0 |
| 15 | DF | (Ukraine) UKR | Oleksandr Chornomorets | 22 | 0 | 19+1 | 0 | 2 | 0 | 0 | 0 |
| 21 | DF | (Ukraine) UKR | Yevhen Novak | 18 | 2 | 14+2 | 1 | 0 | 0 | 2 | 1 |
| 24 | DF | (Ukraine) UKR | Oleksiy Zozulya | 7 | 0 | 4+1 | 0 | 0+1 | 0 | 1 | 0 |
Midfielders
| 8 | MF | (Ukraine) UKR | Yevhen Smyrnyi | 19 | 2 | 10+6 | 2 | 0+1 | 0 | 2 | 0 |
| 9 | MF | (Ukraine) UKR | Denys Antyukh | 27 | 2 | 17+5 | 1 | 2+1 | 0 | 2 | 1 |
| 10 | MF | (Ukraine) UKR | Yevhen Morozko | 11 | 1 | 5+3 | 1 | 1 | 0 | 0+2 | 0 |
| 14 | MF | (Ukraine) UKR | Vadym Milko | 23 | 3 | 13+8 | 3 | 1+1 | 0 | 0 | 0 |
| 18 | MF | (Ukraine) UKR | Denys Kostyshyn | 24 | 5 | 11+8 | 4 | 3 | 1 | 0+2 | 0 |
| 20 | MF | (Ukraine) UKR | Vyacheslav Churko | 11 | 3 | 11 | 3 | 0 | 0 | 0 | 0 |
| 23 | MF | (Ukraine) UKR | Mykyta Kravchenko | 20 | 0 | 19 | 0 | 0 | 0 | 1 | 0 |
| 30 | MF | (Ukraine) UKR | Anton Salabay | 1 | 0 | 0+1 | 0 | 0 | 0 | 0 | 0 |
| 35 | MF | (Belarus) BLR | Nikolay Zolotov | 8 | 0 | 7 | 0 | 1 | 0 | 0 | 0 |
| 38 | MF | (Cameroon) CMR | Alvaro Ngamba | 7 | 0 | 0+6 | 0 | 0+1 | 0 | 0 | 0 |
| 48 | MF | (Ukraine) UKR | Pavlo Orikhovskyi | 25 | 7 | 16+5 | 4 | 1+2 | 3 | 0+1 | 0 |
| 69 | MF | (Ukraine) UKR | Oleh Ilyin | 26 | 0 | 8+15 | 0 | 1+2 | 0 | 0 | 0 |
| 70 | MF | (Ukraine) UKR | Stanislav Morarenko | 1 | 0 | 0 | 0 | 0+1 | 0 | 0 | 0 |
| 77 | MF | (Ukraine) UKR | Stanislav Sorokin | 2 | 0 | 0+2 | 0 | 0 | 0 | 0 | 0 |
| 90 | MF | (Ukraine) UKR | Andriy Bohdanov | 22 | 0 | 15+3 | 0 | 2 | 0 | 2 | 0 |
| 94 | MF | (Senegal) SEN | Mamadou Danfa | 12 | 1 | 2+7 | 1 | 3 | 0 | 0 | 0 |
| 99 | MF | (Ukraine) UKR | Yevhen Zadoya | 21 | 0 | 12+5 | 0 | 2 | 0 | 2 | 0 |
Forwards
| 7 | FW | (Ukraine) UKR | Volodymyr Lysenko | 27 | 5 | 18+5 | 5 | 2 | 0 | 2 | 0 |
| 11 | FW | (Ukraine) UKR | Yevhen Seleznyov | 12 | 5 | 5+5 | 5 | 0 | 0 | 0+2 | 0 |
| 17 | FW | (Ukraine) UKR | Dmytro Khlyobas | 6 | 0 | 2+4 | 0 | 0 | 0 | 0 | 0 |
| 19 | FW | (Ukraine) UKR | Yevhen Isayenko | 16 | 1 | 1+13 | 1 | 1+1 | 0 | 0 | 0 |
Players transferred out during the season
| 6 | DF | (Ukraine) UKR | Maksym Maksymenko | 8 | 0 | 6 | 0 | 2 | 0 | 0 | 0 |
| 17 | FW | (Ukraine) UKR | Oleksandr Bondarenko | 1 | 0 | 1 | 0 | 0 | 0 | 0 | 0 |
| 29 | DF | (Ukraine) UKR | Vladyslav Yemets | 9 | 0 | 6 | 0 | 1 | 0 | 2 | 0 |
| 33 | FW | (Ukraine) UKR | Stanislav Koval | 1 | 1 | 0 | 0 | 0+1 | 1 | 0 | 0 |

Source: Competitions

Last updated: 9 May 2021

=== Goalscorers ===
| Rank | No. | Pos | Nat | Name | Premier League | Cup | Europa League | Total |
|---|---|---|---|---|---|---|---|---|
| 1 | 48 | MF | (Ukraine) | Pavlo Orikhovskyi | 4 | 3 | 0 | 7 |
| 2 | 7 | FW | (Ukraine) | Volodymyr Lysenko | 5 | 0 | 0 | 5 |
| 2 | 11 | FW | (Ukraine) | Yevhen Seleznyov | 5 | 0 | 0 | 5 |
| 2 | 18 | MF | (Ukraine) | Denys Kostyshyn | 4 | 1 | 0 | 5 |
| 5 | 14 | MF | (Ukraine) | Vadym Milko | 3 | 0 | 0 | 3 |
| 5 | 20 | MF | (Ukraine) | Vyacheslav Churko | 3 | 0 | 0 | 3 |
| 7 | 5 | DF | (Ukraine) | Kyrylo Petrov | 2 | 0 | 0 | 2 |
| 7 | 8 | MF | (Ukraine) | Yevhen Smyrnyi | 2 | 0 | 0 | 2 |
| 7 | 9 | MF | (Ukraine) | Denys Antyukh | 1 | 0 | 1 | 2 |
| 7 | 10 | MF | (Ukraine) | Yevhen Morozko | 2 | 0 | 0 | 2 |
| 7 | 21 | DF | (Ukraine) | Yevhen Novak | 1 | 0 | 1 | 2 |
| 12 | 13 | DF | (Ukraine) | Vitaliy Havrysh | 1 | 0 | 0 | 1 |
| 12 | 19 | FW | (Ukraine) | Yevhen Isayenko | 1 | 0 | 0 | 1 |
| 12 | 33 | FW | (Ukraine) | Stanislav Koval | 0 | 1 | 0 | 1 |
| 12 | 94 | MF | (Senegal) | Mamadou Danfa | 1 | 0 | 0 | 1 |
| | | | | Own goal | 1 | 0 | 0 | 1 |
| | | | | Total | 36 | 5 | 2 | 43 |

Last updated: 9 May 2021

=== Clean sheets ===
| Rank | No. | Pos | Nat | Name | Premier League | Cup | Europa League | Total |
|---|---|---|---|---|---|---|---|---|
| 1 | 25 | GK | (Ukraine) | Yevhen Volynets | 10 | 1 | 0 | 1 |
| 2 | 31 | GK | (Ukraine) | Vladyslav Kucheruk | 1 | 2 | 0 | 3 |
| | | | | Total | 11 | 3 | 0 | 14 |

Last updated: 9 May 2021

=== Disciplinary record ===
| No. | Pos | Nat | Player | Premier League | | | Cup | | | Europa League | | | Total | | |
| No. | Pos | Nat | Player | Booked | (yellow card) (yellow-red card) | Sent off (straight red) | Booked | (yellow card) (yellow-red card) | Sent off (straight red) | Booked | (yellow card) (yellow-red card) | Sent off (straight red) | Booked | (yellow card) (yellow-red card) | Sent off (straight red) |
| 5 | DF | (Ukraine) | Kyrylo Petrov | 6 | 0 | 0 | 0 | 0 | 0 | 0 | 0 | 0 | 6 | 0 | 0 |
| 6 | DF | (Ukraine) | Maksym Maksymenko | 1 | 0 | 1 | 0 | 0 | 0 | 0 | 0 | 0 | 1 | 0 | 1 |
| 7 | FW | (Ukraine) | Volodymyr Lysenko | 4 | 0 | 0 | 0 | 0 | 0 | 0 | 0 | 0 | 4 | 0 | 0 |
| 8 | MF | (Ukraine) | Yevhen Smyrnyi | 3 | 0 | 0 | 0 | 0 | 0 | 0 | 0 | 0 | 3 | 0 | 0 |
| 9 | MF | (Ukraine) | Denys Antyukh | 5 | 0 | 0 | 0 | 0 | 0 | 0 | 0 | 0 | 5 | 0 | 0 |
| 10 | MF | (Ukraine) | Yevhen Morozko | 0 | 0 | 0 | 0 | 0 | 0 | 1 | 0 | 0 | 1 | 0 | 0 |
| 11 | FW | (Ukraine) | Yevhen Seleznyov | 4 | 0 | 0 | 0 | 0 | 0 | 0 | 0 | 0 | 4 | 0 | 0 |
| 13 | DF | (Ukraine) | Vitaliy Havrysh | 5 | 0 | 0 | 0 | 0 | 0 | 1 | 0 | 0 | 6 | 0 | 0 |
| 14 | MF | (Ukraine) | Vadym Milko | 4 | 0 | 0 | 0 | 0 | 0 | 0 | 0 | 0 | 4 | 0 | 0 |
| 15 | DF | (Ukraine) | Oleksandr Chornomorets | 4 | 0 | 0 | 2 | 0 | 0 | 0 | 0 | 0 | 6 | 0 | 0 |
| 17 | FW | (Ukraine) | Oleksandr Bondarenko | 1 | 0 | 0 | 0 | 0 | 0 | 0 | 0 | 0 | 1 | 0 | 0 |
| 18 | MF | (Ukraine) | Denys Kostyshyn | 5 | 1 | 0 | 2 | 0 | 0 | 0 | 0 | 0 | 7 | 1 | 0 |
| 20 | MF | (Ukraine) | Vyacheslav Churko | 4 | 0 | 0 | 0 | 0 | 0 | 0 | 0 | 0 | 4 | 0 | 0 |
| 21 | DF | (Ukraine) | Yevhen Novak | 2 | 0 | 0 | 0 | 0 | 0 | 0 | 0 | 0 | 2 | 0 | 0 |
| 23 | MF | (Ukraine) | Mykyta Kravchenko | 3 | 0 | 0 | 0 | 0 | 0 | 1 | 0 | 0 | 4 | 0 | 0 |
| 24 | DF | (Ukraine) | Oleksiy Zozulya | 1 | 0 | 0 | 0 | 0 | 0 | 0 | 0 | 0 | 1 | 0 | 0 |
| 25 | GK | (Ukraine) | Yevhen Volynets | 3 | 0 | 0 | 0 | 0 | 0 | 0 | 0 | 0 | 3 | 0 | 0 |
| 29 | MF | (Ukraine) | Vladyslav Yemets | 1 | 0 | 0 | 0 | 0 | 0 | 0 | 0 | 0 | 1 | 0 | 0 |
| 31 | GK | (Ukraine) | Vladyslav Kucheruk | 1 | 0 | 0 | 0 | 0 | 0 | 0 | 0 | 0 | 1 | 0 | 0 |
| 33 | FW | (Ukraine) | Stanislav Koval | 0 | 0 | 0 | 1 | 0 | 0 | 0 | 0 | 0 | 1 | 0 | 0 |
| 35 | DF | (Belarus) | Nikolay Zolotov | 5 | 0 | 0 | 1 | 0 | 0 | 0 | 0 | 0 | 6 | 0 | 0 |
| 38 | MF | (Cameroon) | Alvaro Ngamba | 2 | 0 | 0 | 0 | 0 | 0 | 0 | 0 | 0 | 2 | 0 | 0 |
| 48 | MF | (Ukraine) | Pavlo Orikhovskyi | 3 | 0 | 0 | 0 | 0 | 0 | 0 | 0 | 0 | 3 | 0 | 0 |
| 69 | MF | (Ukraine) | Oleh Ilyin | 6 | 0 | 0 | 1 | 0 | 0 | 0 | 0 | 0 | 7 | 0 | 0 |
| 70 | MF | (Ukraine) | Stanislav Morarenko | 0 | 0 | 0 | 1 | 0 | 0 | 0 | 0 | 0 | 1 | 0 | 0 |
| 90 | MF | (Ukraine) | Andriy Bohdanov | 4 | 0 | 0 | 2 | 0 | 0 | 2 | 0 | 0 | 8 | 0 | 0 |
| 94 | MF | (Senegal) | Mamadou Danfa | 2 | 0 | 0 | 0 | 0 | 0 | 0 | 0 | 0 | 2 | 0 | 0 |
| 99 | MF | (Ukraine) | Yevhen Zadoya | 4 | 0 | 0 | 0 | 0 | 0 | 2 | 0 | 0 | 6 | 0 | 0 |
| | | | Total | 83 | 1 | 1 | 10 | 0 | 0 | 7 | 0 | 0 | 100 | 1 | 1 |

Last updated: 9 May 2021

=== Attendances ===
| | Matches | Attendances | Average | High | Low |
|---|---|---|---|---|---|
| Premier League | 13 | 8,256 | 635 | 2,478 | 0 |
| Cup | 0 | 0 | 0 | 0 | 0 |
| Total | 13 | 8,256 | 635 | 2,478 | 0 |

Last updated: 9 May 2021
