= 2020–21 Ukrainian Premier League =

30th season of top-tier football league in Vyshcha Liha

FavBet Liha (UPL)
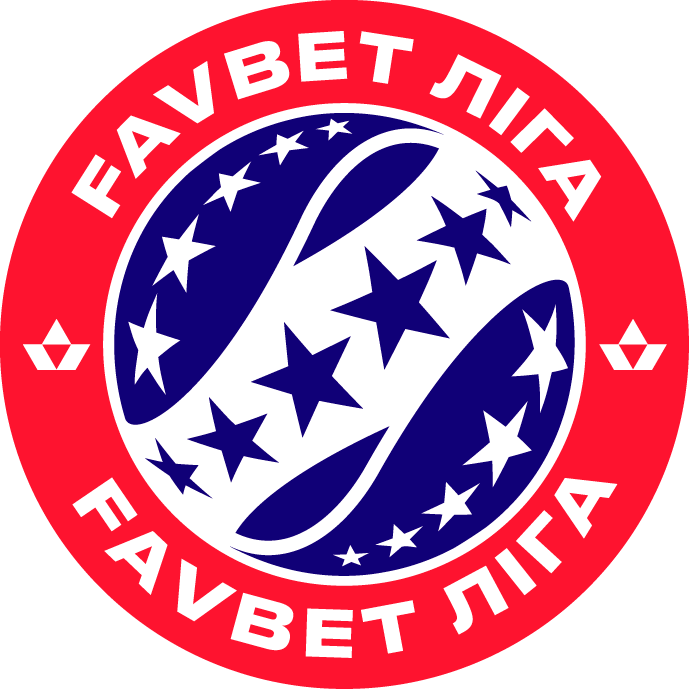
- Official logo
- Season: 2020–21
- Dates: 21 August 2020 – 9 May 2021 (winter break 13 December 2020 – 13 February 2021)
- Teams: 14
- Champions: Dynamo Kyiv; 16th Ukrainian league title 29th domestic league title
- Relegated: Olimpik
- Champions League: Dynamo Kyiv; Shakhtar Donetsk
- Europa League: Zorya Luhansk
- Europa Conference League: Kolos Kovalivka; Vorskla Poltava
- Matches: 182
- Goals: 481 (2.64 per match)
- Top goalscorer: 15 – Vladyslav Kulach (Vorskla Poltava)
- Biggest home win: 5 – Dynamo 5–0 Inhulets (Round 23)
- Biggest away win: 5 – Lviv 0–5 Zorya (Round 4)
- Highest scoring: 7 – Vorskla 5–2 Rukh (Round 1), Oleksandriya 4–3 Inhulets (Round 6), Mariupol 4–3 Inhulets (Round 20)
- Highest attendance: 7,953 – Rukh 1–1 Shakhtar (Round 2) (Note: All matches with spectators have attendance restrictions of 25% stadium capacity due to the COVID-19 pandemic.)
- Total attendance: 106713
- Average attendance: 1694
- All statistics correct as of 9 May 2021.

The 2020–21 Ukrainian Premier League season was the 30th top-level football club competition since the dissolution of the Soviet Union and the 13th since the establishment of the Ukrainian Premier League.

The 13-time winner Shakhtar Donetsk were the four-time defending champions. On 25 April 2021, Dynamo Kyiv won the record-extending 16th title with three matches remaining, after the victory over Inhulets Petrove in the Round 23 home game.

The season started on 21 August 2020 and was initially set to end on 15 May 2021. On 7 April 2021 it was announced that most of clubs voted to end competitions a week early on 9 May 2021.

== Summary ==
This season was the first since the 2015–16, when the league consisted of double round-robin tournament, without the second stage and division to the two groups. This season also had the latest start of the competition in history.

A season, that usually starts in July, was postponed for a month due to the COVID-19 pandemic situation in Ukraine. From 10 September to 13 October 2020, attendance restrictions were lifted and stadiums were allowed some spectators not to exceed about 25% of stadium capacity.

At least four managers of the UPL openly expressed their opinion not to postpone any games due to the COVID-19 cases. Nevertheless, two games of the season's fall half were postponed to spring.

For the next 2021–22 season, the league is expected to expand again to 16 teams as part of the league's expansion plan. As a consequence, this season the lowest-ranked team from Ukrainian Premier League got relegated to Ukrainian First League, and at the same time the top three teams from the First League will gain promotion to the Premier League next season.

== Teams ==
This season, as it was announced earlier, the Ukrainian Premier League has been expanded to 14 teams, which includes 11 teams from the previous season and the top three teams from the 2019–20 Ukrainian First League.

=== Promoted teams ===
- FC Mynai – the champion of the 2019–20 Ukrainian First League (debut)
- Rukh Lviv – runner-up of the 2019–20 Ukrainian First League (debut)
- Inhulets Petrove – third place of the 2019–20 Ukrainian First League (debut)

=== Location map ===
The following displays the location of teams.

Home venues of teams in the 2020–21 Ukrainian Premier League.
Teams in italics are from a conflict zone of the War in Donbas and are playing their home games in different cities.

=== Stadiums ===
Three of the qualified to the date teams play their matches outside of home towns. The minimum threshold for the stadium's capacity in the UPL is 5,000 (Article 10, paragraph 7.2).

The following stadiums are regarded as home grounds:

Rank	Stadium	Place	Club	Capacity	Notes
1	NSC Olimpiyskiy	Kyiv	Dynamo Kyiv	70,050	
1	NSC Olimpiyskiy	Kyiv	Shakhtar Donetsk	70,050	used as home ground during the season
1	NSC Olimpiyskiy	Kyiv	FC Mynai	70,050	used as home ground in round 4
2	OSC Metalist	Kharkiv	FC Lviv	40,003	used as home ground in round 19
2	OSC Metalist	Kharkiv	FC Mariupol	40,003	used as home ground in rounds 20, 22, 23
3	Arena Lviv	Lviv	Rukh Lviv	34,915	
3	Arena Lviv	Lviv	FC Lviv	34,915	
4	Dnipro-Arena	Dnipro	SC Dnipro-1	31,003	
4	Dnipro-Arena	Dnipro	Inhulets Petrove	31,003	used as home ground in round 1
5	Ukraina Stadium	Lviv	FC Lviv	28,051	used as home ground in rounds 1-4
6	Butovsky Vorskla Stadium	Poltava	Vorskla Poltava	24,795	
6	Butovsky Vorskla Stadium	Poltava	Inhulets Petrove	24,795	used as home ground in round 15
7	Lobanovsky Dynamo Stadium	Kyiv	Olimpik Donetsk	16,873	used as home ground during the season
7	Lobanovsky Dynamo Stadium	Kyiv	FC Mariupol	16,873	used as home ground in round 12
7	Lobanovsky Dynamo Stadium	Kyiv	Dynamo Kyiv	16,873	used as home ground in rounds 13, 14
7	Lobanovsky Dynamo Stadium	Kyiv	Kolos Kovalivka	16,873	used as home ground in round 14
7	Lobanovsky Dynamo Stadium	Kyiv	Desna Chernihiv	16,873	used as home ground in round 15, 16
8	Zirka Stadium	Kropyvnytskyi	Inhulets Petrove	14,628	used as home ground during the season
9	Volodymyr Boiko Stadium	Mariupol	FC Mariupol	12,680	Mariupol returned to home stadium in round 19 due to renovations during the first half
10	Avanhard Stadium	Lutsk	FC Lviv	12,080	used as home ground in round 1
11	Avanhard Stadium	Uzhhorod	FC Mynai	12,000	used as home ground during the season
12	Slavutych-Arena	Zaporizhzhia	Zorya Luhansk	12,000	used as home ground during the season
12	Slavutych-Arena	Zaporizhzhia	FC Mariupol	12,000	used as home ground in rounds 14, 15
13	CSC Nika Stadium	Oleksandriya	FC Oleksandriya	7,000	
14	Chernihiv Stadium	Chernihiv	Desna Chernihiv	5,500	
14	Chernihiv Stadium	Chernihiv	Olimpik Donetsk	5,500	used as home ground in round 10, 24
15	Obolon Arena	Kyiv	Desna Chernihiv	5,100	used as home ground in round 9
16	Kolos Stadium	Kovalivka	Kolos Kovalivka	5,000	Opened before Round 2
17	Skif Stadium	Lviv	Rukh Lviv	3,742	used as home ground in round 17

Notes

1. INH–DN1: The Round 1 game Inhulets – Dnipro-1 was played at Dnipro-Arena and Inhulets was selected as a formal host, instead the Round 14 game with Dnipro-1 as formal host will be played at Zirka Stadium, which is the home stadium of Inhulets during the first half of the season. Before the start of the season, there was uncertainty where Inhulets would be hosting its home games in the UPL if get promoted. Since Petrove is located about halfway between Dnipro and Kropyvnytskyi, Inhulets had some intentions to play at better stadium in Dnipro where it used to play at amateur level previously, but such arrangements go against certain administrative rules. The game Dnipro-1 – Inulets did not take place in Kropyvnytskyi as it was planned earlier and without additional announcements and/or explanation was also played in Dnipro.
2. MYN–DYN: The Round 4 game Mynai – Dynamo was played at NSC Olimpiyskiy and Mynai was selected as a formal host, instead the Round 17 game with Dynamo as formal host will be played at Avanhard Stadium. On March 5, 2021 it was decided that the game of Round 17 also will be played in Kyiv due to supposedly the epidemiological situation in Zakarpattia Oblast.

=== Personnel and sponsorship ===
Team	President	Head coach	Captain	Kit manufacturer	Shirt sponsor
Desna Chernihiv	Volodymyr Levin	(Ukraine) Oleksandr Ryabokon	(Ukraine) Vladyslav Ohirya	Nike	Parimatch
SC Dnipro-1	Yuriy Bereza	(Croatia) Igor Jovićević	(Ukraine) Serhiy Lohinov	Nike	—
Dynamo Kyiv	Ihor Surkis	(Romania) Mircea Lucescu	(Ukraine) Serhiy Sydorchuk	New Balance	A-Bank
Inhulets Petrove	Oleksandr Povoroznyuk	(Ukraine) Serhiy Lavrynenko	(Croatia) Mladen Bartulović	Joma	etg.ua
Kolos Kovalivka	Andriy Zasukha	(Ukraine) Ruslan Kostyshyn	(Ukraine) Vitaliy Havrysh	Nike	Svitanok
FC Lviv	Bohdan Kopytko	(Ukraine) Anatoliy Bezsmertnyi	(Brazil) Rafael Sabino	Jako	Parimatch
FC Mariupol	Tariq Mehmood Chaudhry	(Ukraine) Ostap Markevych	(Ukraine) Dmytro Myshnyov	Nike	Favorite Sport
FC Mynai	Valeriy Peresolyak	(Ukraine) Mykola Tsymbal	(Azerbaijan) Andrey Popovich	Nike	FavBet
FC Oleksandriya	Serhiy Kuzmenko	(Ukraine) Volodymyr Sharan	(Ukraine) Yuriy Pankiv	Nike	AhroVista
Olimpik Donetsk	Vladyslav Helzin	(Ukraine) Roman Sanzhar	(Ukraine) Serhiy Politylo	Joma	Parimatch
Rukh Lviv	Hryhoriy Kozlovskyi	(Ukraine) Ivan Fedyk	(Ukraine) Yaroslav Martynyuk	Puma	Grand Hotel
Shakhtar Donetsk	Rinat Akhmetov	(Portugal) Luís Castro	(Ukraine) Andriy Pyatov	Nike	Parimatch
Vorskla Poltava	Kostyantyn Zhevago	(Ukraine) Yuriy Maksymov	(Ukraine) Volodymyr Chesnakov	Nike	Ferrexpo
Zorya Luhansk	Yevhen Heller	(Ukraine) Viktor Skrypnyk	(Ukraine) Mykyta Shevchenko	Nike	Favorite Sport

=== Managerial changes ===
Team	Outgoing manager	Manner of departure	Date of vacancy	Table	Incoming manager	Date of appointment	Table
Dynamo Kyiv	(Ukraine) Oleksiy Mykhaylychenko	Mutual agreement	20 July 2020	Pre-season	(Romania) Mircea Lucescu	23 July 2020	Pre-season
Olimpik Donetsk	(Ukraine) Ihor Klymovskyi (interim)	Made permanent	20 July 2020	Pre-season	(Ukraine) Ihor Klymovskyi	20 July 2020	Pre-season
FC Mariupol	(Ukraine) Oleksandr Babych	End of contract	30 July 2020	Pre-season	(Ukraine) Ostap Markevych	3 August 2020	Pre-season
SC Dnipro-1	(Ukraine) Dmytro Mykhaylenko	Resigned	18 September 2020	11th	(Croatia) Igor Jovićević	22 September 2020	11th
FC Lviv	(Georgia (country)) Giorgi Tsetsadze	Resigned	24 October 2020	14th	(Ukraine) Vitaliy Shumskyi (interim)	28 October 2020	14th
Olimpik Donetsk	(Ukraine) Ihor Klymovskyi	Mutual consent	25 February 2021	8th	(Ukraine) Yuriy Kalitvintsev	25 February 2021	8th
FC Lviv	(Ukraine) Vitaliy Shumskyi (interim)	Mutual consent	1 March 2021	14th	(Ukraine) Anatoliy Bezsmertnyi	2 March 2021	14th
FC Mynai	(Ukraine) Vasyl Kobin	Resigned	24 March 2021	13th	(Ukraine) Mykola Tsymbal	26 March 2021	13th
Olimpik Donetsk	(Ukraine) Yuriy Kalitvintsev	Mutual consent	3 May 2021	13th	(Ukraine) Roman Sanzhar	4 May 2021	13th

== League table ==
=== Standings ===
Pos	Team	Pld	W	D	L	GF	GA	GD	Pts	Qualification or relegation
1	Dynamo Kyiv (C)	26	20	5	1	59	15	+44	65	Qualification for the Champions League group stage
2	Shakhtar Donetsk	26	16	6	4	54	19	+35	54	Qualification for the Champions League third qualifying round
3	Zorya Luhansk	26	15	5	6	44	22	+22	50	Qualification for the Europa League play-off round
4	Kolos Kovalivka	26	10	11	5	36	26	+10	41	Qualification for the Europa Conference League third qualifying round
5	Vorskla Poltava	26	11	8	7	37	30	+7	41	Qualification for the Europa Conference League second qualifying round
6	Desna Chernihiv	26	10	8	8	38	32	+6	38	
7	SC Dnipro-1	26	8	6	12	36	38	−2	30	
8	FC Lviv	26	8	5	13	25	51	−26	29 (Note: Head-to-head goal difference: Lviv +1, Oleksandriya -1)	
9	FC Oleksandriya	26	8	5	13	33	37	−4	29	
10	Rukh Lviv	26	6	10	10	27	39	−12	28	
11	FC Mariupol	26	6	8	12	27	41	−14	26 (Note: Head-to-head points: Mariupol 4, Inhulets 1)	
12	Inhulets Petrove	26	5	11	10	24	39	−15	26	
13	Olimpik Donetsk (R)	26	6	4	16	28	48	−20	22	Relegation to Ukrainian First League
14	FC Mynai	26	4	6	16	16	47	−31	18	Readmitted

Source: Ukrainian Premier League
Rules for classification: 1) Points; 2) Head-to-head points; 3) Head-to-head goal difference; 4) Head-to-head higher number of goals scored; 5) Goal difference; 6) Higher number of goals scored; 7) Draw or "Golden match" if two teams tied for title (Article 22, paragraph 3).
(C) Champions; (R) Relegated

=== Results ===
Teams play each other twice on a home and away basis.

Home \ Away	DES	DN1	DYN	INH	KOL	LVI	MAR	MYN	OLK	OLD	RUX	SHA	VOR	ZOR
Desna Chernihiv		0–2	1–1	3–0	2–2	0–1	2–0	1–0	4–1	2–0	3–1	2–2	1–0	3–1
SC Dnipro-1	2–0		1–2	2–0	0–2	5–1	1–2	3–0	0–0	1–3	1–1	0–1	2–2	0–1
Dynamo Kyiv	0–0	2–0		5–0	2–2	3–1	0–0	3–0	1–0	3–1	3–0	0–3	2–0	1–1
Inhulets Petrove	1–1	1–1	0–2		0–0	1–0	1–1	1–1	1–0	2–1	0–0	0–3 (Note: In accordance with the UAF CDC decision of 12 December 2020 decision [it was decided that] FC Inhulets Petrove have been handed a 0:3 forfeit defeat, and FC Shakhtar Donetsk have been handed a 3:0 win.)	2–2	1–1
Kolos Kovalivka	1–1	1–1	0–3	0–0		4–0	1–0	2–2	1–1	1–2	1–2	0–0	3–0	1–0
FC Lviv	1–0	1–3	1–4	1–1	0–2		1–3	1–0	3–1	1–1	1–1	3–2	1–0	0–5
FC Mariupol	4–1	2–2	1–2	4–3	1–4	1–2		0–0	0–1	1–1	0–3	0–3	0–1	0–1
FC Mynai	3–1	3–2	0–4	0–1	0–0	1–2	0–1		1–0	2–1	0–0	0–4	1–2	0–3
FC Oleksandriya	2–2	4–1	1–2	4–3	0–2	1–0	4–1	3–0		2–0	0–0	2–0	0–2	0–2
Olimpik Donetsk	0–2	0–2	1–4	0–3	1–2	1–1	3–3	3–0	3–2		3–1	0–1	0–1	2–1
Rukh Lviv	0–4	4–1	0–2	2–2	1–2	0–0	0–0	2–0	2–1	3–0		1–1	1–1	0–2
Shakhtar Donetsk	4–0	2–1	0–1	1–0	3–1	5–1	4–1	5–1	1–1	2–0	2–0		1–1	0–1
Vorskla Poltava	1–1	0–1	1–5	2–0	3–0	2–1	0–0	1–1	3–1	3–0	5–2	0–2		4–2
Zorya Luhansk	2–1	3–1	0–2	2–0	1–1	4–0	0–1	1–0	2–1	2–1	4–0	2–2	0–0	

Source: UPL calendar
Legend: Blue = home team win; Yellow = draw; Red = away team win.

== Season statistics ==
=== Top goalscorers ===
As of 9 May 2021

Rank	Scorer	Team	Goals (Pen.)
1	(Ukraine) Vladyslav Kulach	Vorskla Poltava	15 (5)
2	(Ukraine) Viktor Tsyhankov	Dynamo Kyiv	12 (4)
3	(Iran) Shahab Zahedi	Olimpik / Zorya	10 (2)
3	(Azerbaijan) Anatoliy Nuriyev	FC Mynai	10 (6)
5	(Ukraine) Oleksandr Hladkyy	Zorya Luhansk	9
5	(Israel) Manor Solomon	Shakhtar Donetsk	9
5	(Ukraine) Andriy Totovytskyi	Desna Chernihiv	9 (2)
8	(Ukraine) Artem Bondarenko	FC Mariupol	8 (3)
9	(Ukraine) Ruslan Stepanyuk	Vorskla Poltava	7
9	(Croatia) Mario Ćuže	SC Dnipro-1	7 (1)
9	(Ukraine) Pylyp Budkivskyi	Desna Chernihiv	7 (2)
9	(Croatia) Mladen Bartulović	Inhulets Petrove	7 (5)

=== Assists ===
As of 9 May 2021

Rank	Scorer	Team	Assists
1	(Brazil) Alan Patrick	Shakhtar Donetsk	8
2	(Ukraine) Oleksiy Hutsuliak	Desna Chernihiv	7
3	(Ukraine) Andriy Bohdanov	Kolos Kovalivka	6
3	(Croatia) Frane Čirjak	FC Lviv	6
3	(Brazil) Dodô	Shakhtar Donetsk	6
3	(Ukraine) Vladyslav Kabayev	Zorya Luhansk	6
3	(Ukraine) Vladyslav Kalitvintsev	Desna Chernihiv	6
3	(Ukraine) Kyrylo Kovalets	FC Oleksandriya	6
3	(Ukraine) Oleksandr Pikhalyonok	SC Dnipro-1	6

=== Hat-tricks ===
Player	For	Against	Result	Date
(Ukraine) Artem Bondarenko	FC Mariupol	Inhulets Petrove	4–3	3 April 2021
(Ukraine) Vladyslav Kulach	Vorksla Poltava	Zorya Luhansk	4–2	17 April 2021
(Ukraine) Vitaliy Buyalskyi	Dynamo Kyiv	Vorskla Poltava	5–1	1 May 2021

Away win
Home win
Draw

== Awards ==
=== Monthly awards ===
Month	Player of the Month		Coach of the Month		Ref.
Month	Player	Club	Coach	Club	Ref.
September 2020	(Ukraine) Ruslan Stepanyuk	Vorskla Poltava	(Ukraine) Yuriy Maksymov	Vorskla Poltava	
October 2020	(Ukraine) Vladyslav Kulach	Vorskla Poltava	(Croatia) Igor Jovićević	SC Dnipro-1	
November 2020	(Ukraine) Vladyslav Kocherhin	Zorya Luhansk	(Ukraine) Serhiy Lavrynenko	Inhulets Petrove	
December 2020	(Ukraine) Dmytro Ivanisenya	Zorya Luhansk	(Ukraine) Ivan Fedyk	Rukh Lviv	
February 2021	(Iran) Allahyar Sayyadmanesh	Zorya Luhansk	(Ukraine) Viktor Skrypnyk	Zorya Luhansk	
March 2021	(Brazil) China	FC Lviv	(Romania) Mircea Lucescu	Dynamo Kyiv	
April 2021	(Ukraine) Illya Zabarnyi	Dynamo Kyiv	(Romania) Mircea Lucescu	Dynamo Kyiv	
May 2021	(Ukraine) Yehor Nazaryna	Zorya Luhansk	(Romania) Mircea Lucescu	Dynamo Kyiv	

=== Round awards ===
Round	Player			Coach		
Round	Player	Club	Reference	Coach	Club	Reference
Round 1	(Ukraine) Yevhen Volynets	Kolos Kovalivka		(Ukraine) Oleksandr Ryabokon	Desna Chernihiv	
Round 2	(Ukraine) Volodymyr Lysenko	Kolos Kovalivka		(Ukraine) Ihor Klymovskyi	Olimpik Donetsk	
Round 3	(Iran) Shahab Zahedi	Olimpik Donetsk		(Ukraine) Yuriy Maksymov	Vorskla Poltava	
Round 4	(Ukraine) Oleksandr Hladkyi	Zorya Luhansk		(Ukraine) Volodymyr Sharan	FC Oleksandriya	
Round 5	(Ukraine) Oleksiy Hutsulyak	Desna Chernihiv		(Ukraine) Ihor Klymovskyi	Olimpik Donetsk	
Round 6	(Ukraine) Viktor Kovalenko	Shakhtar Donetsk		(Croatia) Igor Jovićević	SC Dnipro-1	
Round 7	(Ukraine) Dmytro Riznyk	Vorskla Poltava		(Ukraine) Viktor Skrypnyk	Zorya Luhansk	
Round 8	(Ukraine) Viktor Tsyhankov	Dynamo Kyiv		(Ukraine) Vitaliy Shumskyi	FC Lviv	
Round 9	(Ukraine) Taras Stepanenko	Shakhtar Donetsk		(Ukraine) Ruslan Kostyshyn	Kolos Kovalivka	
Round 10	(Ukraine) Anatoliy Nuriyev	FC Mynai		(Ukraine) Yuriy Maksymov	Vorskla Poltava	
Round 11	(Slovenia) Benjamin Verbič	Dynamo Kyiv		(Ukraine) Serhiy Lavrynenko	Inhulets Petrove	
Round 12	(Ukraine) Artem Hromov	Zorya Luhansk		(Ukraine) Viktor Skrypnyk	Zorya Luhansk	
Round 13	(Ukraine) Valeriy Fedorchuk	Rukh Lviv		(Ukraine) Ivan Fedyk	Rukh Lviv	
winter break
Round 14	(Ukraine) Oleksandr Hladkyy	Zorya Luhansk		(Ukraine) Vitaliy Shumskyi	FC Lviv	
Round 15	(Ukraine) Pavlo Orikhovskyi	Kolos Kovalivka		(Croatia) Igor Jovićević	SC Dnipro-1	
Round 16	(Iran) Allahyar Sayyadmanesh	Zorya Luhansk		(Ukraine) Viktor Skrypnyk	Zorya Luhansk	
Round 17	(Ukraine) Oleksandr Hladkyy	Zorya Luhansk		(Ukraine) Oleksandr Ryabokon	Desna Chernihiv	
Round 18	(Ukraine) Serhiy Sydorchuk	Dynamo Kyiv		(Romania) Mircea Lucescu	Dynamo Kyiv	
Round 19	(Brazil) China	FC Lviv		(Ukraine) Anatoliy Bezsmertnyi	FC Lviv	
Round 20	(Ukraine) Artem Bondarenko	FC Mariupol		(Romania) Mircea Lucescu	Dynamo Kyiv	
Round 21	(Ukraine) Andriy Totovytskyi	Desna Chernihiv		(Ukraine) Oleksandr Ryabokon	Desna Chernihiv	
Round 22	(Ukraine) Vladyslav Kulach	Vorskla Poltava		(Romania) Mircea Lucescu	Dynamo Kyiv	
Round 23	(Ukraine) Illya Zabarnyi	Dynamo Kyiv		(Ukraine) Volodymyr Sharan	FC Oleksandriya	
Round 24	(Ukraine) Vitaliy Buyalskyi	Dynamo Kyiv		(Ukraine) Serhiy Lavrynenko	Inhulets Petrove	
Round 25	(Ukraine) Andriy Boryachuk	Rukh Lviv		(Ukraine) Viktor Skrypnyk	Zorya Luhansk	
Round 26	(Ukraine) Danylo Sikan	FC Mariupol		(Romania) Mircea Lucescu	Dynamo Kyiv	

== See also ==
- 2020–21 Ukrainian First League
- 2020–21 Ukrainian Second League
- 2020–21 Ukrainian Football Amateur League
- 2020–21 Ukrainian Cup
- List of Ukrainian football transfers summer 2020
- List of Ukrainian football transfers winter 2020–21
