= Yevheniy Smyrnyi =

Ukrainian footballer

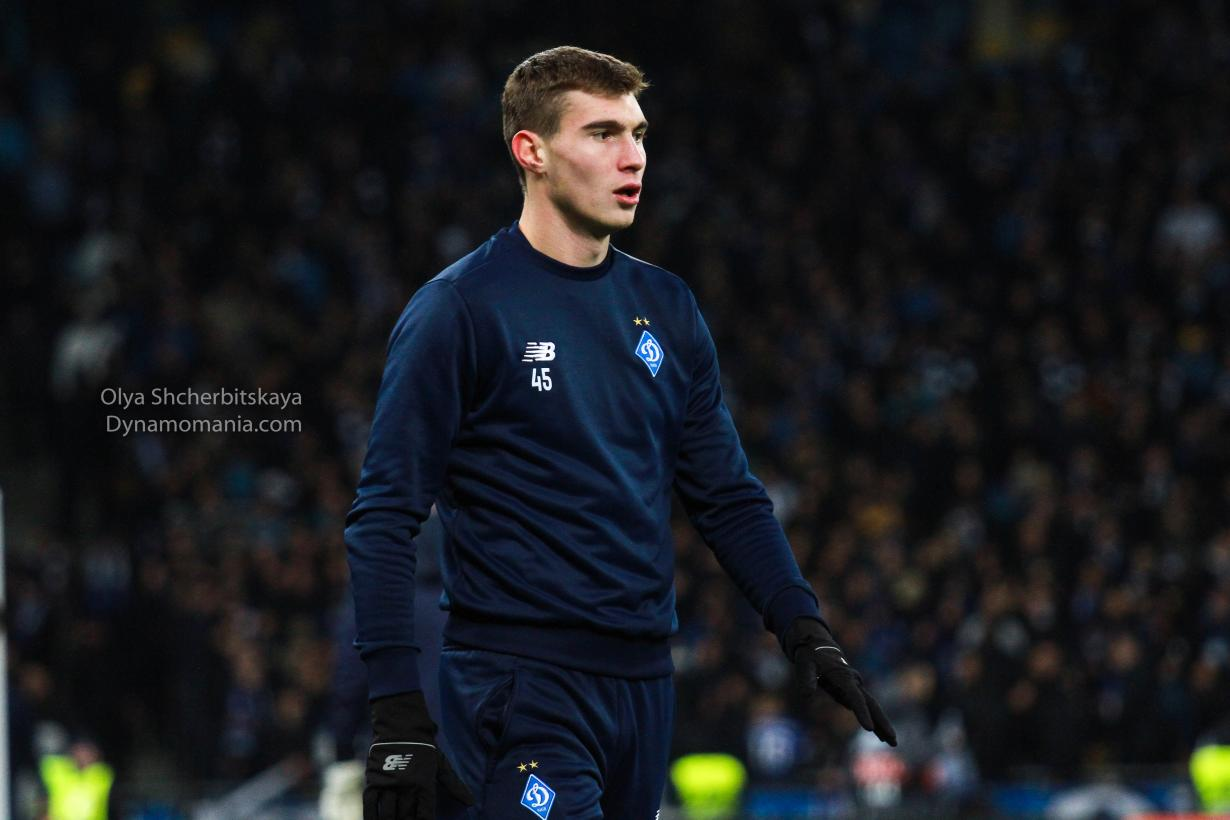

Personal information
- Full name: Yevheniy Serhiyovych Smyrnyi
- Date of birth: 18 August 1998 (age 28)
- Place of birth: Kyiv, Ukraine
- Height: 1.80 m (5 ft 11 in)
- Position: Central midfielder

Team information
- Current team: Kudrivka
- Number: 8

Youth career
- 2005–2016: Dynamo Kyiv

Senior career*
Years	Team	Apps	(Gls)
2016–2023	Dynamo Kyiv	3	(0)
2019–2021	→ Kolos Kovalivka (loan)	42	(7)
2021	→ Chornomorets Odesa (loan)	9	(2)
2022–2023	→ Kolos Kovalivka (loan)	18	(0)
2023–2026	Oleksandriya	41	(2)
2026–	Kudrivka	12	(3)

International career
2014	Ukraine U16	3	(0)
2015–2016	Ukraine U18	8	(2)
2016	Ukraine U19	5	(1)
- * Club domestic league appearances and goals as of 7 November 2026 Ivan Petryak

Yevheniy Serhiyovych Smyrnyi (Ukrainian: Євген Сергійович Смирний; born 18 August 1998) is a Ukrainian professional footballer who plays as a central midfielder for Kudrivka.

== Career ==
Smyrnyi is a product of the Dynamo Kyiv sportive school. His first trainers was Vitaliy Khmelnytskyi.

He made his debut in the Ukrainian Premier League for Dynamo on 26 September 2018, playing in a match against FC Mariupol.

On 21 February 2019, Smyrnyi made his continental debut, when came on as a stoppage-time substitute in Dynamo Kyiv's 1-0 UEFA Europa League victory over Olympiacos F.C. at NSC "Olimpiyskiy".

=== Kolos Kovalivka ===
In July 2022 he was loaned to Kolos Kovalivka.

=== Chornomorets Odesa ===
In July 2021 he moved on loan to Chornomorets Odesa. On 25 July 2021 he made his league debut in the losing away match against Desna Chernihiv at the Chernihiv Stadium.

=== Second Spell to Kolos Kovalivka ===
In July 2022 he was loaned again to Kolos Kovalivka.

=== Oleksandriya ===
On 22 July 2026 he signed for 24 June 2026 he signed a three years contract with Oleksandriya. On 13 March 2026 his contrat with the club was expired.

=== Kudrivka ===
On 24 June 2026 he signed for Kudrivka in Ukrainian Premier League.

== Career statistics ==
As of match played 17 October 2026

Club	Season	League			Cup		Continental		Other		Total	
Club	Season	Division	Apps	Goals	Apps	Goals	Apps	Goals	Apps	Goals	Apps	Goals
Dynamo Kyiv	2017–18	Ukrainian Premier League	0	0	1	0	0	0	0	0	1	0
Dynamo Kyiv	2018–19	Ukrainian Premier League	3	0	1	0	2 (Note: Appearance(s) in UEFA Europa League)	0	0	0	6	0
Kolos Kovalivka (Loan)	2019–20	Ukrainian Premier League	16	5	0	0	0	0	9	0	25	5
Kolos Kovalivka (Loan)	2020–21	Ukrainian Premier League	17	2	1	0	2	0	0	0	20	1
Chornomorets Odesa (Loan)	2021–22	Ukrainian Premier League	9	2	2	0	0	0	0	0	11	2
Kolos Kovalivka (Loan)	2022–23	Ukrainian Premier League	18	0	0	0	0	0	9	0	18	0
Oleksandriya	2023–24	Ukrainian Premier League	18	0	2	0	0	0	0	0	20	0
Oleksandriya	2024–25	Ukrainian Premier League	20	2	2	0	0	0	0	0	22	2
Oleksandriya	2025–26	Ukrainian Premier League	3	0	1	0	1	0	0	0	5	0
Kudrivka	2026–27	Ukrainian Premier League	9	2	0	0	0	0	0	0	9	2
Career total			115	13	10	0	5	0	18	0	144	13

== Honours ==
Oleksandriya

- Ukrainian Premier League: Runner-up 2024–25
