= Stanislav Morarenko =

Ukrainian footballer

Personal information
- Full name: Stanislav Vyacheslavovych Morarenko
- Date of birth: 3 August 2001 (age 25)
- Place of birth: Starokozache, Odesa Oblast, Ukraine
- Height: 1.78 m (5 ft 10 in)
- Position: Central midfielder

Team information
- Current team: FK Grobiņa
- Number: 70

Youth career
- 2014: DYuSSh Bilhorod-Dnistrovskyi
- 2014: Metalurh Donetsk
- 2015: Mykolaiv
- 2015–2016: DYuSSh Bilhorod-Dnistrovskyi
- 2016: Mykolaiv
- 2016–2018: Chornomorets Odesa

Senior career*
Years	Team	Apps	(Gls)
2018–2019	Chornomorets Odesa	0	(0)
2019	Dnistrovets Bilhorod-Dnistrovskyi	0	(0)
2020–2023	Kolos Kovalivka	0	(0)
2021–2022	→ Podillya Khmelnytskyi (loan)	30	(4)
2022–2023	→ Dinaz Vyshhorod (loan)	18	(4)
2023	Metalist Kharkiv	15	(0)
2024–2025	Dinaz Vyshhorod	21	(4)
2025–	FK Grobiņa	7	(0)
- * Club domestic league appearances and goals as of 17 November 2025

Stanislav Vyacheslavovych Morarenko (Ukrainian: Станіслав В'ячеславович Мораренко; born 3 August 2001) is a Ukrainian professional footballer who plays as a central midfielder for FK Grobiņa.
