= Mykyta Kravchenko =

Ukrainian footballer

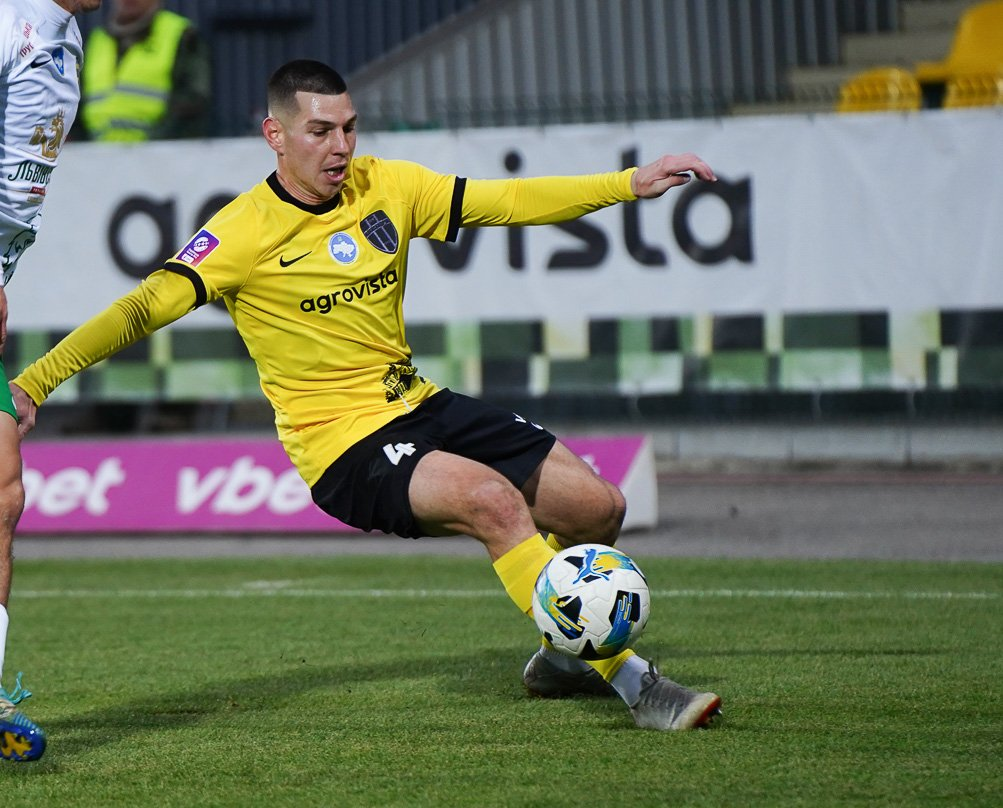

Personal information
- Full name: Mykyta Yakovych Kravchenko
- Date of birth: 14 June 1997 (age 29)
- Place of birth: Zuhres, Ukraine
- Height: 1.81 m (5 ft 11 in)
- Position: Midfielder

Team information
- Current team: Polissya Zhytomyr
- Number: 4

Youth career
- 2010–2011: Shakhtar Donetsk
- 2011–2014: Illichivets Mariupol

Senior career*
Years	Team	Apps	(Gls)
2014–2015	Illichivets Mariupol	2	(0)
2015–2024	Dynamo Kyiv	6	(0)
2020	→ Olimpik Donetsk (loan)	12	(0)
2020–2021	→ Kolos Kovalivka (loan)	19	(0)
2021–2022	→ Dnipro-1 (loan)	14	(0)
2023	→ Kolos Kovalivka (loan)	13	(0)
2023–2024	→ Polissya Zhytomyr (loan)	14	(0)
2024–2025	Oleksandriya	27	(0)
2025–	Polissya Zhytomyr	14	(0)

International career^{‡}
2016	Ukraine U20	1	(0)
- * Club domestic league appearances and goals as of 3 June 2026 ‡ National team caps and goals as of 25 June 2023

Mykyta Yakovych Kravchenko (Ukrainian: Микита Якович Кравченко; born 14 June 1997) is a Ukrainian professional footballer who plays as a midfielder for Polissya Zhytomyr in the Ukrainian Premier League.

== Career ==
He is a product of the FC Illichivets Mariupol sportive school.

Kravchenko made his debut for FC Illichivets Mariupol against FC Metalurh Donetsk in the Ukrainian Premier League on 18 April 2015.

In July 2015 he signed a contract with FC Dynamo Kyiv. On 26 April 2017, he made his Dynamo debut in a 4-0 Ukrainian Cup victory over FC Mykolaiv at Tsentralnyi Stadion, when he came on as a substitute for Vitorino Antunes on the 69th minute.
