= Matija Rom =

Slovenian footballer (born 1998)

Personal information
- Date of birth: 1 November 1998 (age 28)
- Place of birth: Ljubljana, Slovenia
- Height: 1.84 m (6 ft 0 in)
- Position: Right-back

Team information
- Current team: Khorazm
- Number: 25

Youth career
- –2017: Domžale

Senior career*
Years	Team	Apps	(Gls)
2016–2020	Domžale	48	(1)
2020	Inter Zaprešić	11	(0)
2020–2022	Kolos Kovalivka	12	(0)
2022–2023	Šibenik	4	(0)
2023	Telavi	24	(0)
2024–2026	Zhenis	49	(0)
2026–	Khorazm	14	(0)

International career
2013	Slovenia U15	1	(0)
2013	Slovenia U16	2	(0)
2014–2015	Slovenia U17	16	(0)
2015–2016	Slovenia U18	16	(0)
2016	Slovenia U19	6	(0)
2017–2020	Slovenia U21	10	(0)
- * Club domestic league appearances and goals as of 29 July 2026

Matija Rom (born 1 November 1998) is a Slovenian footballer who plays as a right-back for Uzbekistan Super League club Khorazm.

== Club career ==
In 2016, Rom was promoted to Domžale's senior team. On 10 December 2016, he made his senior team debut in the Slovenian PrvaLiga match against Maribor.
