= Serhiy Lavrynenko =

Ukrainian footballer and coach

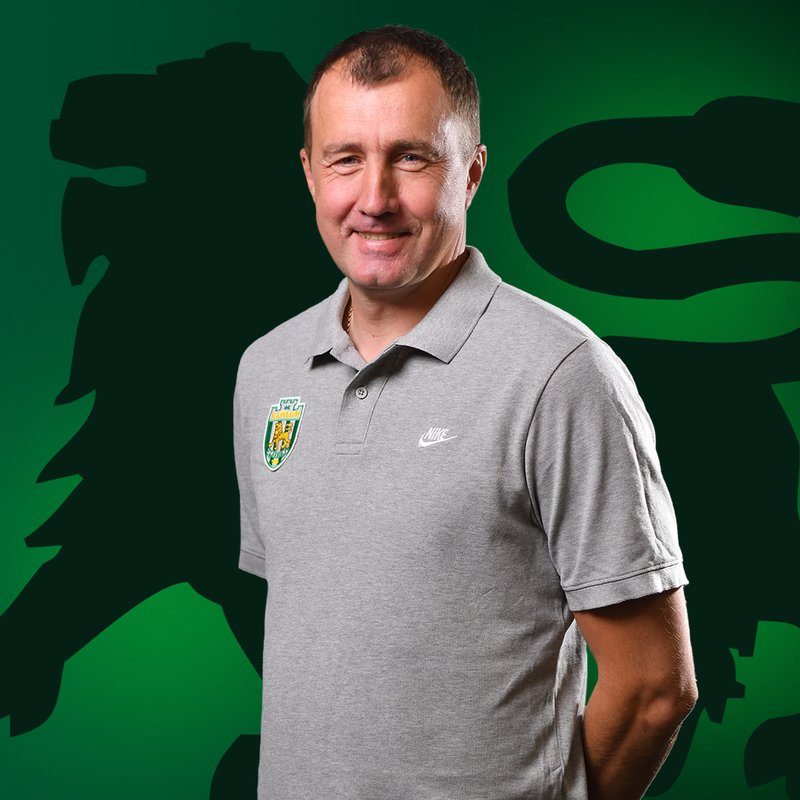

Personal information
- Full name: Serhiy Dmytrovych Lavrynenko
- Date of birth: 17 February 1975 (age 51)
- Place of birth: Ordzhonikidze, Soviet Union (now Ukraine)
- Height: 1.87 m (6 ft 2 in)
- Position: Defender

Youth career
- Ordzhonikidze sports school

Senior career*
Years	Team	Apps	(Gls)
1993–2000	Zirka Kirovohrad	176	(1)
1993	→ Sirius Zhovti Vody (loan)	3	(0)
1997–2000	→ Zirka-2 Kirovohrad	13	(0)
2000–2003	Metalurh Zaporizhzhia	21	(0)
2000–2003	→ Metalurh-2 Zaporizhzhia	33	(4)
2000	→ SSSOR-Metalurh Zaporizhzhia	1	(0)
2002	→ Mykolaiv (loan)	13	(0)
2004	Zirka Kirovohrad	9	(0)
2004	Olimpiya FC AES Yuzhnoukrayinsk	1	(0)
2010–2012	Lokomotyv Znamyanka (amateurs)	19	(0)

Managerial career
- 2014–2015: Zirka Kirovohrad (caretaker)
- 2015–2016: Zirka Kirovohrad
- 2016–2022: Inhulets Petrove
- 2023: Veres Rivne
- 2024: Karpaty Lviv U-19 (assistant)
- * Club domestic league appearances and goals

Serhiy Dmytrovych Lavrynenko (Ukrainian: Сергій Дмитрович Лавриненко; born 17 February 1975) is a Ukrainian professional football coach and former player.

== Career ==
Since 2015 till August 2016 he worked a head coach of FC Zirka Kirovohrad, while in late 2014 Lavrynenko performed functions of an acting head coach.

== Honours ==
Individual

- Ukrainian Premier League Manajer of the Month: 2020-21(November),
