= Vitaliy Shumskyi =

Ukrainian footballer and coach

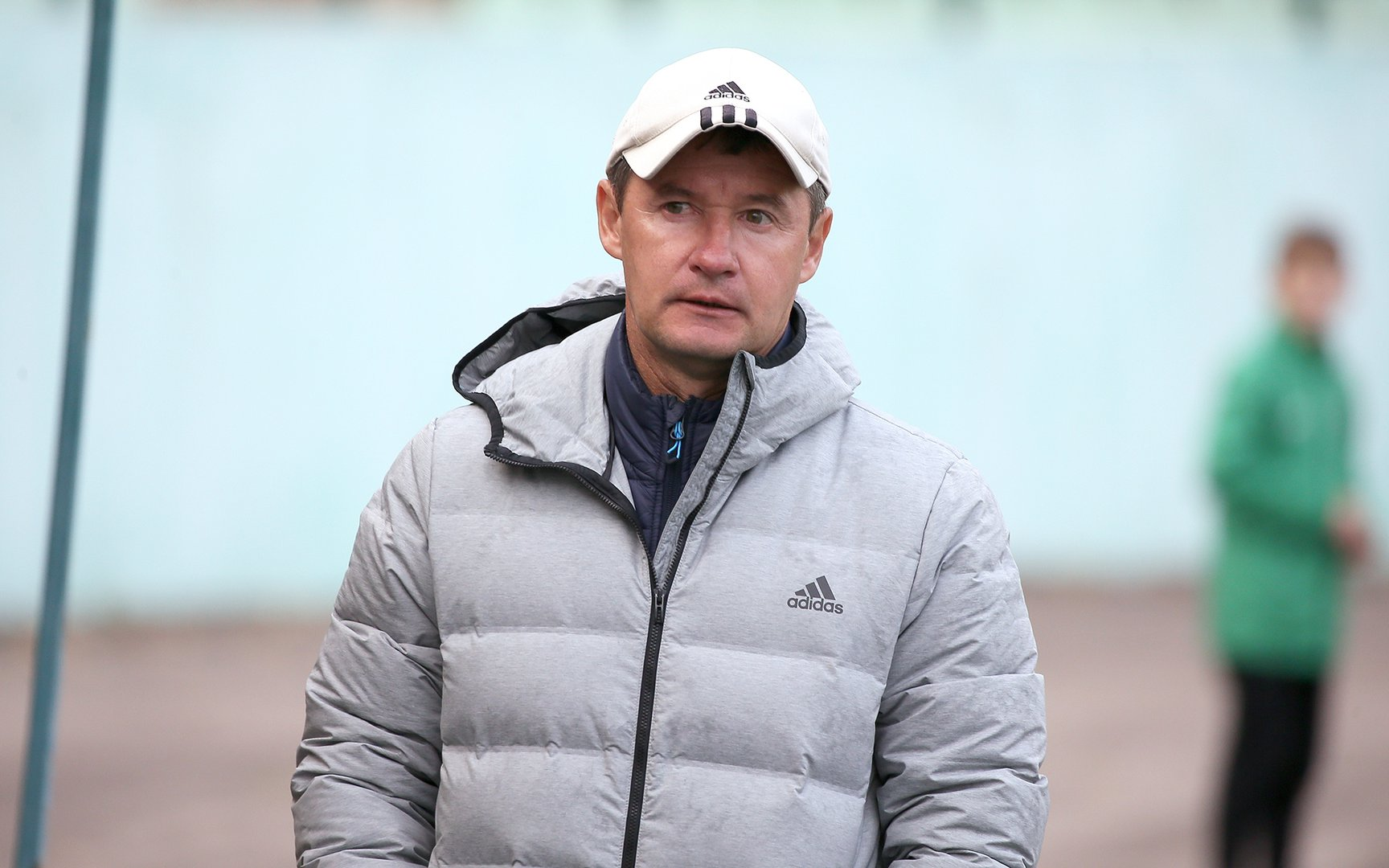

Personal information
- Date of birth: 17 May 1972 (age 54)
- Place of birth: Zolochiv, Ukrainian SSR
- Height: 1.74 m (5 ft 8 1/2 in)
- Position: Defender

Team information
- Current team: Munkach Mukachevo (manager)

Senior career*
Years	Team	Apps	(Gls)
1991–1992	Karpaty/Skala Stryi	21	(1)
1992–1993	Hazovyk Komarno	13	(2)
1993–1994	Nyva Ternopil	35	(1)
1994–1996	Karpaty Lviv	59	(1)
1996	Dnipro Dnipropetrovsk	8	(1)
1997	Nyva Ternopil	4	(0)
1997–1998	Prykarpattia Ivano-Frankivsk	44	(7)
1998	→ Tysmenytsia (loan)	1	(0)
1999	Dynamo Lviv	8	(2)
2000–2007	KFC Sint-Lenaarts	?	(?)
2008	Sokil Zolochiv	4	(1)
2010	FC Buh Busk	?	(?)
2012	Rava Rava-Ruska	9	(2)
2012–2013	FC Khimik Novyi Rozdol	10	(3)

Managerial career
- –2018: Sports school Karpaty (coach)
- 2018: Nyva Ternopil
- 2020: Lviv (assistant)
- 2020–2021: Lviv (interim)
- 2021–2022: Munkach Mukachevo
- * Club domestic league appearances and goals

Vitaliy Shumskyi (Ukrainian: Віталій Іванович Шумський; born 17 May 1972) is a Ukrainian professional football coach and a former player.

== Playing career ==
After playing in Belgium Shumskyi moved to Spain, where he worked in the construction industry. In Madrid, he was the playing coach of the Ukrainian diaspora team - FC Lviv.

== Managerial career ==
Joined FC Lviv for the 2020–21 Ukrainian Premier League and following resignation of Giorgi Tsetsadze as an interim manager gained the club's first win in the season and honored as the best manager of the round by the league.
