= Stanislav Koval =

Ukrainian footballer

Personal information
- Full name: Stanislav Ivanovych Koval
- Date of birth: 1 May 2002 (age 24)
- Place of birth: Uzhhorod, Ukraine
- Height: 1.77 m (5 ft 10 in)
- Position: Striker

Youth career
- 2015–2019: Youth Sportive School Uzhhorod

Senior career*
Years	Team	Apps	(Gls)
2019–2023	Kolos Kovalivka	0	(0)
2021	→ Polissya Zhytomyr (loan)	15	(4)
2021–2023	→ Podillya Khmelnytskyi (loan)	12	(1)
2023	St. Louis City 2	4	(0)
- * Club domestic league appearances and goals as of 3 January 2024

Stanislav Ivanovych Koval (Ukrainian: Станіслав Іванович Коваль; born 1 May 2002) is a Ukrainian professional footballer who plays as a striker.

== Career ==
Born in Uzhhorod, Koval is a product of the Youth Sportive School in his native city and competed for this team in the Ukrainian Youth Football League.

In July 2019 he joined the newly promoted Ukrainian Premier League side FC Kolos Kovalivka, but never made his debut for its, instead playing in the Ukrainian First League clubs on loan.
