= Vladyslav Kucheruk =

Ukrainian footballer

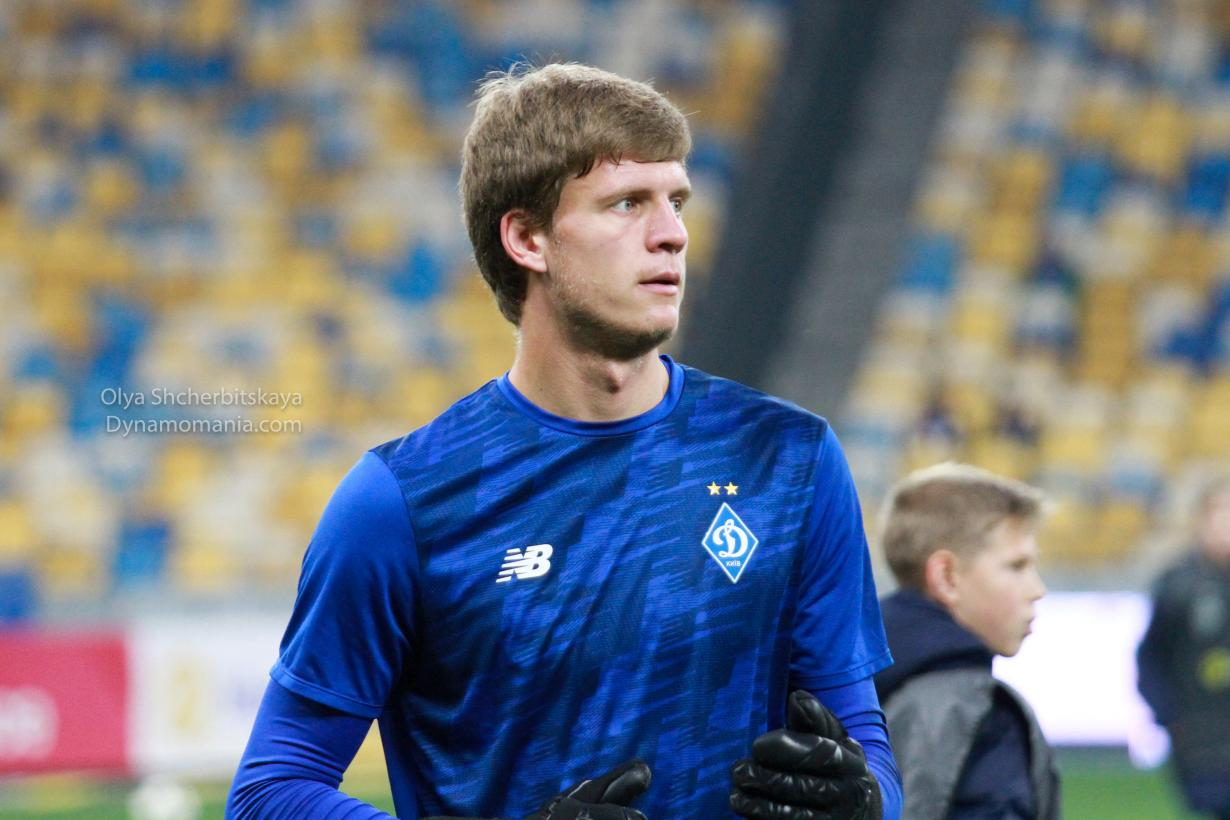

Personal information
- Full name: Vladyslav Viktorovych Kucheruk
- Date of birth: 14 February 1999 (age 27)
- Place of birth: Vinnytsia, Ukraine
- Height: 1.91 m (6 ft 3 in)
- Position: Goalkeeper

Team information
- Current team: Viktoriya Sumy
- Number: 31

Youth career
- 2010–2011: Podillya Khmelnytskyi
- 2012–2016: Dynamo Kyiv

Senior career*
Years	Team	Apps	(Gls)
2016–2022	Dynamo Kyiv	0	(0)
2020–2021	→ Kolos Kovalivka (loan)	6	(0)
2021	→ Chornomorets Odesa (loan)	15	(0)
2023	Zorya Luhansk	0	(0)
2024–2025	Prykarpattia	27	(0)
2025–	Viktoriya Sumy	18	(0)

International career^{‡}
2017	Ukraine U18	1	(0)
2017–2018	Ukraine U19	13	(0)
2018–2019	Ukraine U20	3	(0)
2019	Ukraine U21	2	(0)
Medal record
Men's football
Representing Ukraine
UEFA European Under-19 Championship
Bronze medal – third place	2018 Finland
- * Club domestic league appearances and goals as of 4 June 2026 ‡ National team caps and goals as of 13 August 2023

Vladyslav Viktorovych Kucheruk (Ukrainian: Владислав Вікторович Кучерук; born 14 February 1999) is a Ukrainian professional footballer who plays as a goalkeeper for Viktoriya Sumy in the Ukrainian First League.

== Career ==
=== Early career ===
Kucheruk is a product of the Podillya Khmelnytskyi and Dynamo Kyiv sportive school systems.

=== Dynamo Kyiv ===
==== Loan to Kolos Kovalivka ====
In September 2020 he went on loan to Kolos Kovalivka and made his debut in the Ukrainian Premier League on 17 October 2020, playing as the start squad player in an away losing match against Zorya Luhansk.

==== Loan to Chornomorets Odesa ====
In July 2021 he moved on loan to Chornomorets Odesa. On 25 July 2021 he made his league debut in the losing away match against Desna Chernihiv at the Chernihiv Stadium.

=== Zorya Luhansk ===
On 10 January 2023, Kucheruk signed for Zorya Luhansk.

== International career ==
In 2019, Kucheruk was a member of the Ukraine national under-20 football team first ever FIFA U-20 World Cup title and spent match against Colombia national under-20 football team in the winning quarter-final on 7 June 2019.

== Honours ==
=== International ===
==== Ukraine U20 ====
- FIFA U-20 World Cup: 2019
