= Kolos Stadium (Kovalivka) =

Football stadium in Kovalivka, Kyiv Oblast, Ukraine

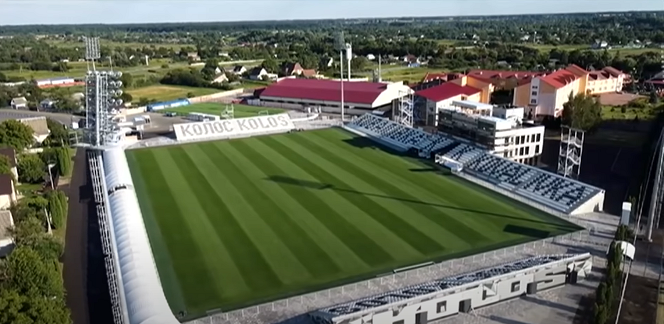
- Interactive map of Kolos Stadium
- Location: Kovalivka, Bila Tserkva Raion, Ukraine
- Coordinates: 49°59′09″N 30°00′30″E
- Owner: Kovalivka village
- Capacity: 5,000
- Surface: Grass

Construction
- Opened: 2014
- Renovated: 2020 (major)

Tenant
- FC Kolos Kovalivka

Kolos Stadium is a football venue located in Kovalivka, Kyiv Oblast, Ukraine. Currently, the Ukrainian Premier League football club FC Kolos Kovalivka plays their home games at the stadium.

== History ==
In 2014 the stadium was rebuilt anew in place of a half ruined stadium located at the same location. Previously, in 2011-2014, the senior team played in Terezyne, Bila Tserkva Raion and Mala Soltanivka, Vasylkiv Raion.

The official opening of the renovated stadium was announced for 2 September 2020. The new construction of the stadium allows it to be used for European competitions. The new stadium allows for up to 5,000 seats for spectators. The pitch is heated with an automated sprinkler system. The first fixture after renovation was on 5 September 2020, with a friendly match against Dynamo Kyiv. The first official match on the new stadium was the Ukrainian Premier League round 2 game against FC Lviv, which was won by Kolos 4–0, with Volodymyr Lysenko scoring the first-ever official goal at the new stadium.
