= Yevhen Yevseyev (footballer, born May 1987) =

Ukrainian footballer

Personal information
- Full name: Yevhen Kostiantynovych Yevseyev
- Date of birth: 9 May 1987 (age 39)
- Place of birth: Dushanbe, Tajik SSR, Soviet Union
- Position: Defender

Team information
- Current team: FC Kolos Kovalivka

Senior career*
Years	Team	Apps	(Gls)
2006–2009	Yednist Plysky	60	(6)
2009	CSKA Kyiv	2	(1)
2010	Veres Rivne	8	(0)
2010–2011	Naftovyk Okhtyrka	24	(2)
2011	FC Putrivka	11	(2)
2012–2015	Kolos Kovalivka	28	(8)
2015	Dinaz Vyshhorod	1	(0)
2016	Liubomyr Stavyshche		
2017	FC Vasylkiv		
- * Club domestic league appearances and goals

Yevhen Yevseyev (born 9 May 1987) is a Ukrainian footballer who is a football functionary for Ukrainian Premier League club FC Kolos Kovalivka. .
