= Alvaro Ngamba =

Cameroonian footballer (born 1998)

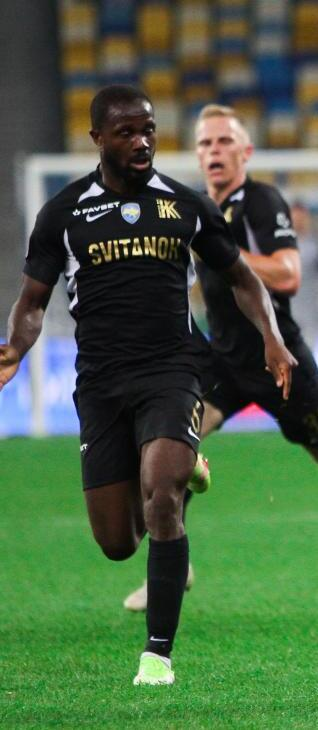

Personal information
- Full name: Thadee Alvaro Ngamba
- Date of birth: 15 December 1998 (age 27)
- Place of birth: Yaoundé, Cameroon
- Height: 1.72 m (5 ft 8 in)
- Position: Midfielder

Team information
- Current team: Cairese

Youth career
- –2016: OGC Nice

Senior career*
Years	Team	Apps	(Gls)
2016–2017	Nice II	4	(0)
2017–2019	Paganese	30	(0)
2020	La Louvière Centre	2	(0)
2020	Podillya Khmelnytskyi	7	(0)
2021–2024	Kolos Kovalivka	11	(0)
2022–2023	→ IFK Mariehamn (loan)	46	(3)
2024	Novara	7	(0)
2024–	Cairese	0	(0)
- * Club domestic league appearances and goals as of 3 May 2024

Thadee Alvaro Ngamba (born 15 December 1998) is a Cameroonian professional footballer who plays as a midfielder for Italian Serie D club Cairese.

== Club career ==
He was born in the Cameroonian capital of Yaoundé. At a young age Ngamba went abroad and is a product of the French OGC Nice youth system. At the professional level he played for Paganese Calcio 1926 in the Italian Serie C. In February 2020 he moved to the Belgian club La Louvière Centre, but could not gain a foothold in the team, and in early October 2020 signed a one-year contract with Ukrainian Second League Podillya Khmelnytskyi. He made his Podillya debut on 10 October 2020 in the home match of the 6th round of Group A of the Second League against FC Uzhhorod.

In January 2021 he signed a 2.5 years contract with the Ukrainian Premier League club Kolos.

On 25 January 2022, he joined Mariehamn in Finland on loan for the 2022 season.
