= Yevhen Volynets =

Ukrainian footballer

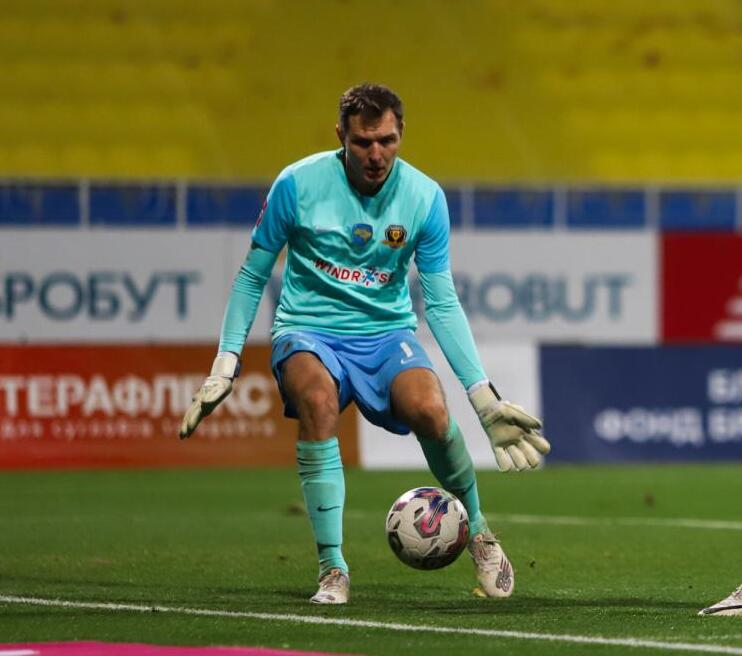

Personal information
- Full name: Yevhen Valeriyovych Volynets
- Date of birth: 26 August 1993 (age 33)
- Place of birth: Kaniv, Ukraine
- Height: 1.88 m (6 ft 2 in)
- Position: Goalkeeper

Team information
- Current team: Polissya Zhytomyr
- Number: 23

Youth career
- 2000–2010: Dynamo Kyiv
- 2004–2007: → Vidradnyi Kyiv

Senior career*
Years	Team	Apps	(Gls)
2010–2016	Dynamo-2 Kyiv	36	(0)
2016–2017	Helios Kharkiv	19	(0)
2017–2023	Kolos Kovalivka	92	(0)
2023–2024	Dnipro-1	22	(0)
2024–	Polissya Zhytomyr	46	(0)

International career^{‡}
2009	Ukraine U16	1	(0)
2010	Ukraine U17	2	(0)
2010–2011	Ukraine U18	7	(0)
2011–2012	Ukraine U19	5	(0)
- * Club domestic league appearances and goals as of 3 June 2026 ‡ National team caps and goals as of 29 July 2020

Yevhen Valeriyovych Volynets (Ukrainian: Євген Валерійович Волинець; born 26 August 1993) is a Ukrainian professional footballer who plays as a goalkeeper for Polissya Zhytomyr in the Ukrainian Premier League.

== Career ==
Volynets was born in Kaniv, but in age of 5 he moved with his family to the capital. He began to play football in Kyiv, where he joined the Dynamo Kyiv youth sportive school system.

Despite being a part of Dynamo's sportive system, Volynets never make his debut for the main team and in summer 2016 transferred to the Ukrainian First League side Helios Kharkiv.
