= Nikolai Zolotov =

Belarusian footballer

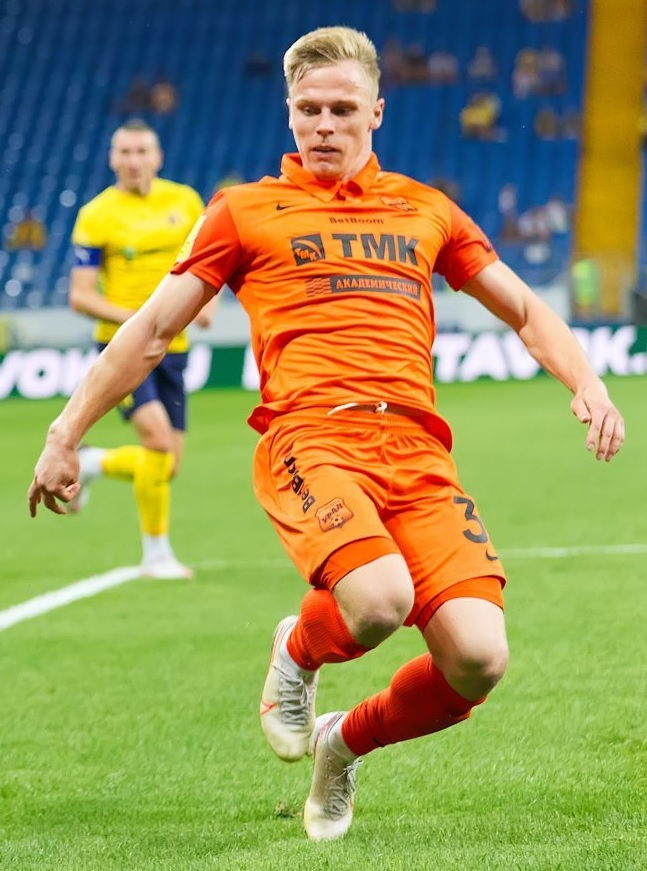
- Zolotov with Ural Yekaterinburg in 2020

Personal information
- Full name: Nikolai Aleksandrovich Zolotov
- Date of birth: 11 November 1994 (age 32)
- Place of birth: Vitebsk, Belarus
- Height: 1.77 m (5 ft 10 in)
- Position: Defender

Team information
- Current team: Zimbru Chișinău
- Number: 35

Youth career
- 2011–2012: Vitebsk
- 2013–2014: Shakhtyor Soligorsk

Senior career*
Years	Team	Apps	(Gls)
2012	Vitebsk-2	27	(1)
2014–2017	Shakhtyor Soligorsk	0	(0)
2015	→ Vitebsk (loan)	16	(0)
2016	→ Vitebsk (loan)	23	(0)
2017–2019	Vitebsk	75	(2)
2020	Ural Yekaterinburg	15	(0)
2021–2023	Kolos Kovalivka	47	(0)
2022	→ Bastia (loan)	1	(0)
2024	Yelimay	5	(0)
2024–2025	Maxline Vitebsk	2	(0)
2025–	Zimbru Chișinău	27	(0)

International career^{‡}
2014–2016	Belarus U21	20	(0)
2019–2021	Belarus	14	(0)
- * Club domestic league appearances and goals as of 1 June 2026 ‡ National team caps and goals as of 2 January 2024

Nikolai Aleksandrovich Zolotov (Belarusian: Мікалай Аляксандравіч Золатаў; Russian: Николай Александрович Золотов; born 11 November 1994) is a Belarusian professional footballer who plays as a defender for Moldovan Liga club Zimbru Chișinău. In 2019–2021, he represented the Belarus national team.

== Club career ==
On 23 December 2019, Zolotov signed a long-term contract with Russian Premier League club FC Ural Yekaterinburg. On 18 January 2021, his Ural contract was terminated by mutual consent.

On 14 April 2022, Zolotov joined Bastia on loan until the end of the season.
