= Yevheniy Novak =

Ukrainian footballer (born 1989)

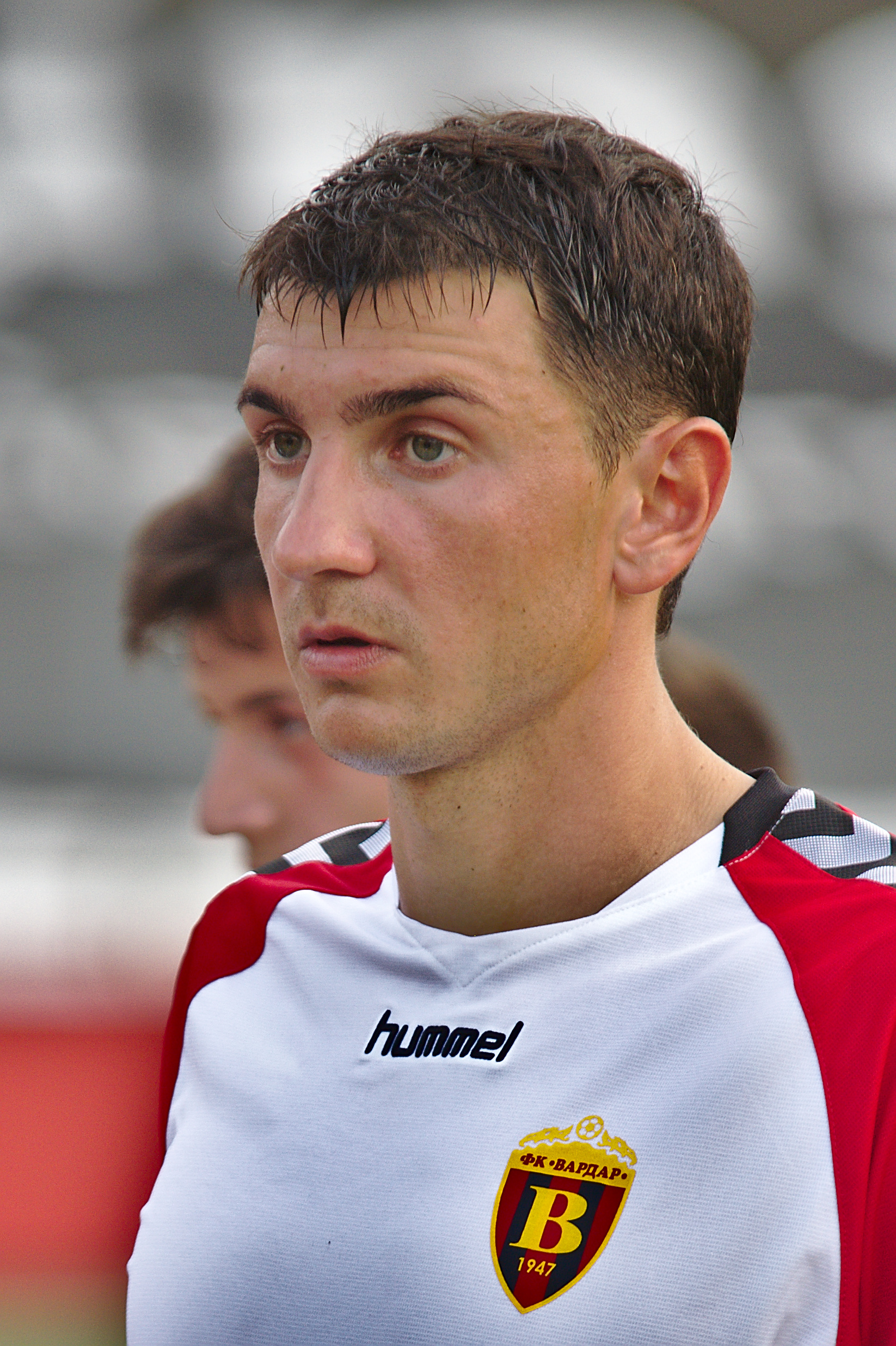
- Novak with Vardar in June 2017

Personal information
- Full name: Yevheniy Anatoliyovych Novak
- Date of birth: 1 February 1989 (age 37)
- Place of birth: Drabiv, Ukrainian SSR
- Height: 1.87 m (6 ft 2 in)
- Position: Centre-back

Team information
- Current team: Kolos Kovalivka (assistant)

Youth career
- 2000–2007: Dynamo Kyiv

Senior career*
Years	Team	Apps	(Gls)
2007–2008	Dynamo-3 Kyiv	36	(6)
2008–2012	Dynamo-2 Kyiv	112	(12)
2012–2014	Sevastopol	43	(1)
2014–2015	Volyn Lutsk	7	(0)
2015–2020	Vardar	112	(5)
2020–2023	Kolos Kovalivka	41	(2)

International career
2009	Ukraine U21	1	(0)

Managerial career
- 2023–: Kolos Kovalivka (assistant)
- * Club domestic league appearances and goals

Yevheniy Anatoliyovych Novak (Ukrainian: Євгеній Анатолійович Новак; born 1 February 1989) is a Ukrainian retired professional footballer who played as a centre-back and current manager, who works as an assistant for Ukrainian club Kolos Kovalivka.

== Club career ==
=== Dynamo Kyiv ===
Novak is a product of Dynamo Kyiv, he made his debut with Dynamo-3 Kyiv on 28 April 2007 in a 0–0 home draw against Knyazha Shchaslyve and after more than a year, Novak made his debut with Dynamo-2 Kyiv on 10 August 2008 in a 2–2 away draw against Knyazha Shchaslyve.

=== Sevastopol ===
On 24 June 2012, Novak joined Ukrainian First League side Sevastopol. On 14 July 2012, he made his debut in a 2–2 home draw against Naftovyk-Ukrnafta Okhtyrka after being named in the starting line-up.

=== Volyn Lutsk ===
On 5 July 2014, Novak joined Ukrainian Premier League side Volyn Lutsk. On 11 August 2014, he made his debut in a 0–1 away defeat against Chornomorets Odesa after coming on as a substitute at 45th minute in place of Roman Hodovanyi.

=== Vardar ===
On 1 September 2015, Novak joined Macedonian First Football League side Vardar after agreeing to a one-year deal with the option of continuation for two years. On 13 September 2015, he made his debut in a 5–1 home win against Horizont Turnovo after coming on as a substitute at 82nd minute in place of Nikola Gligorov.

== International career ==
=== Ukraine ===
==== Under-21 ====
On 28 March 2009, Novak made his debut with Ukraine U21 in a friendly match against Serbia U21 after coming on as a substitute at last minutes in place of Roman Zozulya, he was planned to be called up again from Ukraine U21 in February 2011 for friendly match against Switzerland U21, but due to injury, could not be part of the national team.

=== North Macedonia ===
Večer announced that Novak from 1 September 2020 will officially fulfill the main condition for receive the North Macedonia passport and will be available of North Macedonia national team for UEFA Euro 2020 qualifying play-offs that to be scheduled to take place in October and November 2020.

== Coaching career ==
In June 2023 was announced, that Novak retired from the professional football playing and was appointed as an assisatant manager to Yaroslav Vyshnyak in Kolos Kovalivka.

== Personal life ==
In March 2014, Novak received a call-up from Armed Forces of Ukraine, but stated that he was not going to join the army.
