= Pavlo Orikhovskyi =

Ukrainian footballer

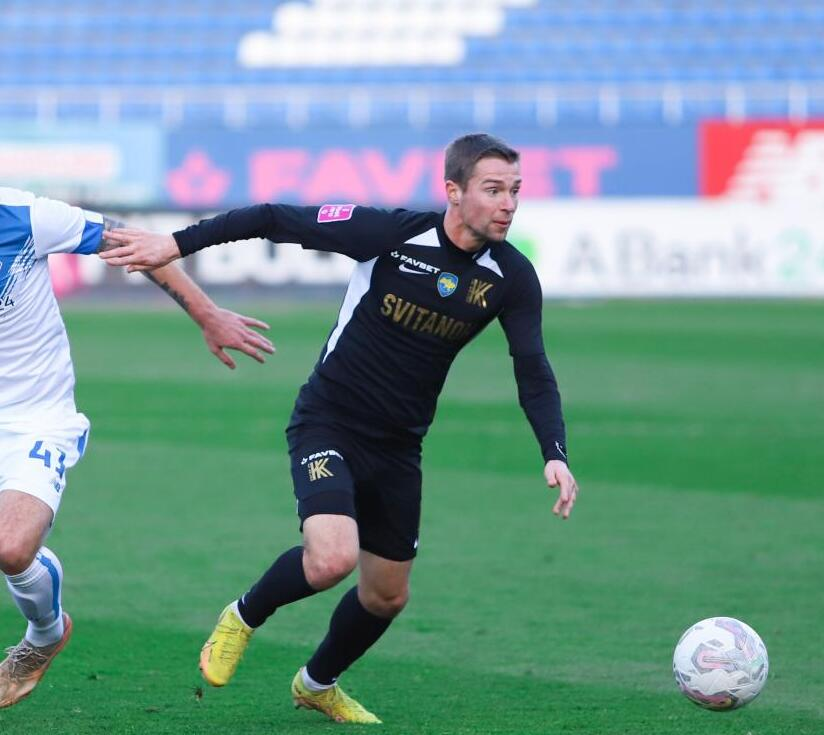

Personal information
- Full name: Pavlo Borysovych Orikhovskyi
- Date of birth: 13 May 1996 (age 30)
- Place of birth: Chervonoarmiisk, Ukraine
- Height: 1.81 m (5 ft 11 1/2 in)
- Position: Midfielder

Team information
- Current team: Feniks-Mariupol
- Number: 10

Youth career
- 2009–2010: FC BRW-BIK Volodymyr-Volynskyi
- 2010–2013: Dynamo Kyiv

Senior career*
Years	Team	Apps	(Gls)
2013–2019	Dynamo Kyiv	4	(1)
2017–2018	→ Chornomorets Odesa (loan)	13	(0)
2018–2019	→ Arsenal Kyiv (loan)	24	(3)
2019–2021	Kolos Kovalivka	42	(6)
2021	Rukh Lviv	5	(0)
2022–2025	Kolos Kovalivka	76	(11)
2026–	Feniks-Mariupol	10	(3)

International career
2012	Ukraine U16	9	(0)
2011–2013	Ukraine U17	12	(1)
2016	Ukraine U21	1	(0)
- * Club domestic league appearances and goals as of 4 June 2026

Pavlo Orikhovskyi (Ukrainian: Павло Борисович Оріховський; born 13 May 1996) is a Ukrainian professional footballer who plays as a midfielder for Ukrainian First League club Feniks-Mariupol.

== Career ==
Orikhovskyi is a product of the BRW-BIK Volodymyr-Volynskyi and FC Dynamo youth sportive schools. His first trainer was Viktor Muntyan.

He spent his career in the Ukrainian Premier League Reserves and in February 2016 was promoted to the main-squad team. Orikhovskyi made his debut in the Ukrainian Premier League for club FC Dynamo Kyiv in a match against FC Karpaty Lviv entraining in the second half-time on 11 March 2016.
