= Mamadou Danfa =

Senegalese footballer

Personal information
- Full name: Mamadou Lamine Danfa
- Date of birth: 6 March 2001 (age 25)
- Place of birth: Senegal
- Height: 1.90 m (6 ft 3 in)
- Position: Forward

Team information
- Current team: Lincoln Red Imps
- Number: 17

Youth career
- 201?–2019: Casa Sports

Senior career*
Years	Team	Apps	(Gls)
2019–2020	Casa Sports	0	(0)
2020–2021	Kolos Kovalivka	12	(1)
2022–2023	Shkupi	32	(4)
2023–2024	FC Ballkani	16	(2)
2025–	Lincoln Red Imps	6	(1)

International career^{‡}
2019	Senegal U20	3	(0)
2019–	Senegal	1	(0)
- * Club domestic league appearances and goals as of 2 May 2025 ‡ National team caps and goals as of 10 June 2021

Mamadou Lamine Danfa (born 6 March 2001) is a Senegalese professional footballer who plays as a forward for Lincoln Red Imps.

== Club career ==
Danfa started playing football at his homeland and is a product of the Casa Sports youth sportive system.

In March 2020 he signed contract with the Ukrainian Premier League club Kolos Kovalivka. Danfa made his debut in the Ukrainian Premier League for FC Kolos as the second half-time substituted player in the losing home match against FC Shakhtar Donetsk on 14 June 2020.

== International career ==
He was involved in the Senegal national under-20 football team, in which in 2019 he became a finalist of the Africa U-20 Cup of Nations. This result allowed the team to qualify for the 2019 FIFA U-20 World Cup in Poland, where he also participated, reaching the quarterfinals with the team.

Danfa made his debut for the Senegal national football team on 3 August 2019 in the winning (3:0) qualification match of the African Nations Championship against the Liberia national football team.
