= Kovalivka, Bila Tserkva Raion, Kyiv Oblast =

Kovalivka Ковалівка
- Village
- Kovalivka
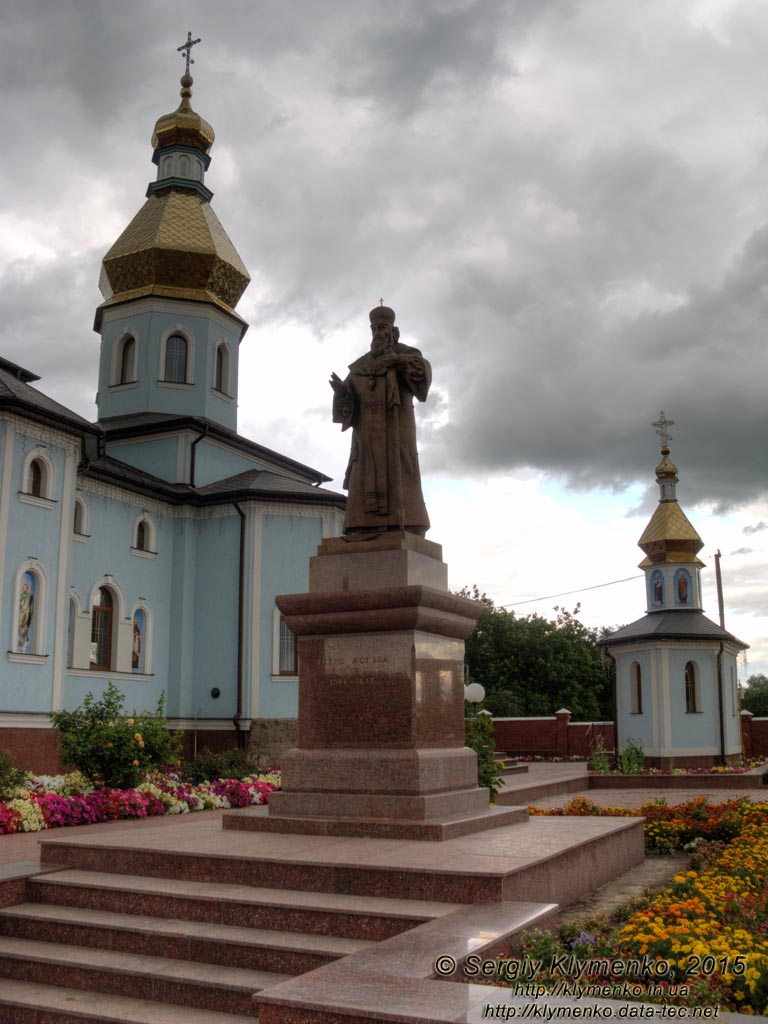
- Monument to Petro Mohyla in the village

- Location within Kyiv Oblast Location within Ukraine
- Coordinates: 49°59′05″N 30°00′47″E
- Oblast: Kyiv Oblast
- Raion: Bila Tserkva Raion
- Established: 1501

Population
  - Total: 1,500
- Postal code: 08652
- Area code: +380 4571

Kovalivka (Ukrainian: Ковалівка) is a village in Bila Tserkva Raion, Kyiv Oblast, Ukraine. It hosts the administration of Kovalivka rural hromada, one of the hromadas of Ukraine. The village is administered by its own rural council. The population is approximately 1,500.

== Geography ==
The village is located over a pond that was created on the Kamianka River which is a tributary of Ros River.

== History ==
The village was established in 1501 by a legendary blacksmith Myna Nazarenko in Kiev Voivodeship of the Polish-Lithuanian Commonwealth. In 1753 here was built a wooden church of St. Volodymyr dedicated to Vladimir the Great. Following the Second Partition of Poland in 1793, the village was taken over the Russian Empire. In 1797 Kovalivka became a center of volost within the Vasilkov uezd.

During the Soviet period, the village housed the Shchors collective farm (kolkhoz) which after dissolution of the Soviet Union was reorganized into an agro firm "Svitanok".

Since 1985 Kovalivka is dominated by a local agrarian company "Svitanok" (meaning "Dawn"), formerly "Kolhosp imeni Shchorsa" which is controlled by the Zasukha family (Anatoliy and Tetiana). In 1996 in the village was built a Church of Nativity of the Theotokos (Ukrainian Orthodox Church). In 2007 in Kovalivka started to be built a convent of St.Anastasia dedicated to the Russian Grand Duchess Alexandra Petrovna of Oldenburg (Ukrainian Orthodox Church (Moscow Patriarchate), UOC-MP). Since 2009 Kovalivka hosts ethnic festival "Zhnyva" (Reaping). In 2014 in the village was opened the Church of St.Tetiana dedicated to Tatiana of Rome (UOC-MP).

Until 18 July 2020, Kovalivka belonged to Vasylkiv Raion. The raion was abolished that day as part of the administrative reform of Ukraine, which reduced the number of raions of Kyiv Oblast to seven. The area of Vasylkiv Raion was split between Bila Tserkva, Fastiv, and Obukhiv Raions, with Kovalivka being transferred to Bila Tserkva Raion.

== Points of interest ==
- Kolos Stadium, home stadium of the local football club FC Kolos Kovalivka
