= Volodymyr Lysenko =

Ukrainian footballer (born 1988)

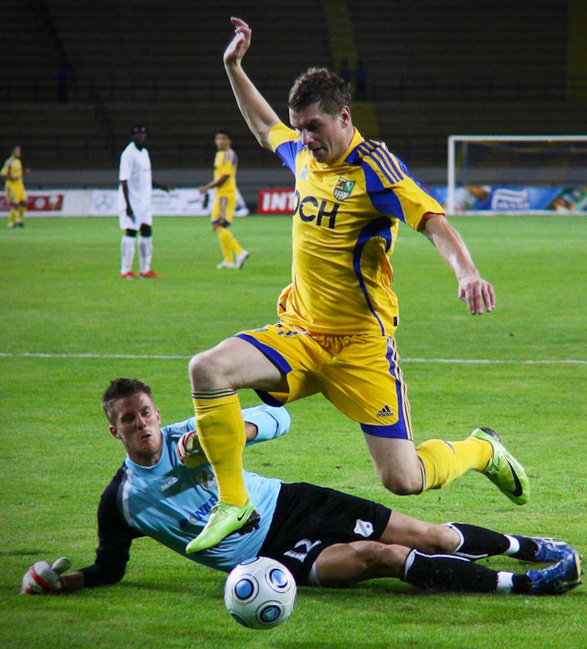

Personal information
- Full name: Volodymyr Volodymyrovych Lysenko
- Date of birth: 20 April 1988 (age 38)
- Place of birth: Kyiv, Soviet Union (now Ukraine)
- Height: 1.83 m (6 ft 0 in)
- Position: Striker

Youth career
- 2001–2002: CSKA Kyiv
- 2003–2004: Dynamo Kyiv

Senior career*
Years	Team	Apps	(Gls)
2004–2007	Dynamo-2 Kyiv	27	(7)
2007–2009	Dynamo Kyiv	3	(0)
2008–2009	→ Arsenal Kyiv (loan)	35	(7)
2009–2014	Metalist Kharkiv	17	(1)
2011	→ Volyn Lutsk (loan)	7	(0)
2011–2012	→ Kryvbas Kryvyi Rih (loan)	18	(0)
2013	→ Hoverla Uzhhorod (loan)	25	(3)
2014	Sevastopol	6	(0)
2014–2016	Olimpik Donetsk	43	(8)
2017	Desna Chernihiv	11	(4)
2017–2023	Kolos Kovalivka	131	(26)
2023–2024	Shturm Ivankiv		

International career
2007	Ukraine U17	33	(12)
2007–2009	Ukraine U19	17	(3)
2008–2010	Ukraine U21	14	(3)
- * Club domestic league appearances and goals

Volodymyr Volodymyrovych Lysenko (Ukrainian: Володимир Володимирович Лисенко; born 20 April 1988) is a Ukrainian retired professional footballer who played as a striker.

== Career ==
=== Club career ===
Lysenko started to play football fo↦r FC CSKA Kyiv, later joined to Dynamo Kyiv, he was finally promoted to the main team in 2006, but he almost never able to play on a game. He was loaned to Arsenal Kyiv for the 2007–08 season and once again for the 2008–09 season. On 22 July 2009 FC Metalist Kharkiv buy his contract from Dynamo Kyiv for €1.5 million.

In June 2023 was announced, that Lysenko is retired from the professional football playing and was appointed as a scout in Kolos Kovalivka structure.

=== International career ===
He played for Ukraine's under-17 and under-19 teams. On 21 August 2007 he debuted for the Ukraine national under-21 football team in a what ended to be 1:1 at home draw with Israel. Since then, Lysenko has played 13 games and netted 3 goals.
