= FC Kolos Kovalivka =

Association football club in Ukraine

Kolos Kovalivka
- Full name: FC Kolos Kovalivka
- Founded: 2012; 14 years ago
- Ground: Kolos Stadium
- Capacity: 5,000
- President: Andriy Zasukha
- General Director: Yevhen Yevseyev
- Head coach: Ruslan Kostyshyn (interim)
- League: Ukrainian Premier League
- 2025–26: Ukrainian Premier League, 6th of 16
- Website: koloskovalivka.com
Home colours	Away colours

FC Kolos Kovalivka (Ukrainian: Колос Ковалівка) is a Ukrainian professional football club from the village of Kovalivka, Kyiv Oblast which competes in the Ukrainian Premier League, having been promoted from the Ukrainian First League on the 8 June 2019 for the first time in their history. The club colors are white and black. The club has three football teams including women and youth.

The club has been described as having a cinderella story in 2020, transforming in five years from an amateur team into a continental challengers by advancing through the full league pyramid (4 tiers). Outside of the league pyramid, the club also holds several honours of regional competitions for Kyiv Oblast which it represents.

The club is named after the Ukrainian sports society Kolos (Agro-Industrial Complex trade unions) that has existed since after World War II. The main sponsor of the club is the Svitanok agrarian company (firm), formerly the Shchors collective farm (kolkhoz).

== History ==
=== Previous team ===
Before establishment of Kolos, the village of Kovalivka had a team Svitanok Kovalivka. In 2008 it made appearance in the Ukrainian Amateur Cup and was eliminated in Round of 16.

=== Current club ===
The club was established in 2012 and until 2015 it participated in championship of Kyiv Oblast playing its games in a neighboring town of Hlevakha. The team were champions three times from 2012 to 2014.

The club in 2014 made their debut in the Ukrainian Football Amateur League. Later that year after winning the Oleh Makarov Memorial Tournament, which is played in winter the head coach Ruslan Kostyshyn announced that the club intended to go into professional football. That year in 2015 after finishing third in the Ukrainian Football Amateur League, the club obtained professional status and joined the PFL entering into the Ukrainian Second League.

In their first season the club won the championship and were promoted to the Ukrainian First League.

On 29 July 2020, FC Kolos in overtime beat FC Mariupol 1–0 and qualified for the European competitions. The head coach Ruslan Kostyshyn was merely shocked stating that did not expect his club to place higher the 8th place.

== Honours ==
Club emblem (2012–18)

- Ukrainian First League
  - Runners-up (1): 2018–19
- Ukrainian Second League
  - Winners (1): 2015–16
- Kyiv Oblast Football Championship
  - Winners (3): 2012, 2013, 2014
- Football cup of Kyiv Oblast
  - Winners (1): 2014

== Squad ==
As of 8 September 2026

Note: Flags indicate national team as defined under FIFA eligibility rules; some limited exceptions apply. Players may hold more than one non-FIFA nationality.

No.	Pos.	Nation	Player
1	GK	UKR	Dmytro Matsapura
2	DF	GEO	Zurab Rukhadze
3	DF	UKR	Eduard Kozik (on loan from Shakhtar Donetsk)
6	DF	UKR	Mykyta Burda
7	MF	UKR	Oleksandr Demchenko
9	DF	UKR	Andriy Tsurikov
10	MF	MKD	Luka Stankovski
11	FW	KOS	Ardit Tahiri
14	MF	MLI	Ibrahim Kane
15	FW	UKR	Artem Husol
17	FW	UKR	Anton Salabay
19	MF	UKR	Oleksiy Bezruchuk
20	MF	GEO	Nika Gagnidze
22	DF	UKR	Vitaliy Katrych

No.	Pos.	Nation	Player
30	FW	UKR	Denys Ndukve
31	GK	UKR	Ivan Pakholyuk
33	DF	UKR	Roman Honcharenko
42	DF	UKR	Oleksandr Savchuk
44	DF	UKR	Vladyslav Shershen
45	DF	UKR	Daniil Khrypchuk
47	MF	UKR	Daniil Denysenko
51	GK	UKR	Valentyn Morhun
55	MF	BRA	Elias Telles
70	FW	UKR	Yuriy Klymchuk
77	DF	UKR	Andriy Ponyedyelnik
81	DF	UKR	Yehor Popravka
90	MF	ALB	Irgi Kasalla
99	MF	ALB	Arinaldo Rrapaj

=== Out on loan ===
Note: Flags indicate national team as defined under FIFA eligibility rules; some limited exceptions apply. Players may hold more than one non-FIFA nationality.

No. / Pos. / Nation / Player; — / DF / UKR / Maksym Sasovskyi (at Kulykiv-Bilka until 30 June 2027)	No. / Pos. / Nation / Player

== Notable players ==
Had international caps for their respective countries. Players whose name is listed in bold represented their countries while playing for Kolos Kovalivka.

Ukraine

- (Ukraine) Andriy Bohdanov
- (Ukraine) Serhiy Bolbat
- (Ukraine) Mykyta Burda
- (Ukraine) Ihor Kharatin
- (Ukraine) Vitaliy Lysytskyi
- (Ukraine) Serhiy Myakushko
- (Ukraine) Yevhen Seleznyov
- (Ukraine) Taras Stepanenko
- (Ukraine) Vladyslav Veleten

Europe

- (Albania) Arinaldo Rrapaj
- (Azerbaijan) Rustam Akhmedzade
- (Azerbaijan) **Anatoliy Nuriyev**
- (Belarus) Aleksandr Pavlovets
- (Belarus) **Nikolay Zolotov**
- (Georgia (country)) **Nika Gagnidze**
- (Iceland) Árni Vilhjálmsson
- (Kosovo) **Ilir Krasniqi**
- (Lithuania) **Gytis Paulauskas**
- (North Macedonia) **Luka Stankovski**

Africa

- (Mali) Ibrahim Kane
- (Senegal) Mamadou Danfa

South America

- (Venezuela) **Jovanny Bolívar**

== Coaches and administration ==
Administration	Coaching (senior team)	Coaching (U-19 team)
President – Andriy Zasukha; General director – Yevhen Yevseyev; Sporting director – Vitaliy Lysytskyi; First Vice-President – Irina (Faizutdinova) Zasukha	Head coach – Oleksandr Pozdeyev; Assistant coach – Serhiy Kozyr; Assistant coach – Andriy Hyrcha; Goalkeeping coach – Vyacheslav Kernozenko; Fitness coach – Vitaliy Mandzyuk	Senior coach – Vitaliy Havrysh; Assistant coach – Yevheniy Novak; Assistant coach – Vadym Milko; Goalkeeper coach U19 - Serhiy Sitalo

== League and cup history ==
Season	Div.	Pos.	Pl.	W	D	L	GS	GA	P	Ukrainian Cup	Other		Notes
2014	**4th** (Championship among amateurs)	**2**	10	6	3	1	19	5	**21**		AC	1/2 finals	
2014	**4th** (Championship among amateurs)	**2**	3	1	1	1	2	4	**4**				
2015	**4th** (Championship among amateurs)	**1**	6	6	0	0	26	3	**18**				
2015	**4th** (Championship among amateurs)	**2**	10	5	1	4	17	5	**16**				**joined the Second League**
2015–16	**3rd** (Second League)	**1**	26	19	3	4	62	22	**60**	1/32 finals			**Promoted**
2016–17	**2nd** (First League)	**5**	34	16	9	9	52	38	**57**	1/32 finals			
2017–18	**2nd** (First League)	**5**	34	19	4	11	39	30	**61**	1/16 finals			
2018–19	**2nd** (First League)	**2**	28	15	9	4	45	18	**54**	1/32 finals			**Promoted**
2019–20	**1st** (Premier League)	**6**	32	10	2	20	33	59	**32**	1/8 finals			
2020–21	**1st** (Premier League)	**4**(Best result)	26	10	11	5	36	26	**41**	**1/4 finals** (Best result)	EL	3QR	
2021–22 was terminated	**1st** (Premier League)	**8**	18/30	7	3	8	14	23	**24**	1/16 finals	ECL	3QR	began on 24.02.2022 Russian invasion of Ukraine
2022–23	**1st** (Premier League)	**8**	30	10	6	14	23	36	**36**	None			
2023–24	**1st** (Premier League)	**11**	30	7	11	12	22	31	**32**	1/16 finals			
2024–25	**1st** (Premier League)	**10**	30	8	12	10	27	25	**36**	1/16 finals			
2025–26	**1st** (Premier League)	**6**	30	13	10	7	30	25	**49**	1/32 finals	-	-	-
2026–27	**1st** (Premier League)	15	2	0	0	2	1	4	0	1/16 finals	-	-	TBD

== European record ==
Kolos Kovalivka has participated in European competition since 2020, playing its first game against Aris Thessaloniki in the 2020–21 UEFA Europa League. Participating in only two European seasons, Kolos played only at the qualification stage.

Season	Competition	Round	Club	Home	Away	Aggregate
2020–21	UEFA Europa League	2Q	(Greece) Aris	—N/a	**2–1**	—N/a
2020–21	UEFA Europa League	3Q	(Croatia) Rijeka	—N/a	**0–2 (a.e.t.)**	—N/a
2021–22	UEFA Europa Conference League	3Q	(Kazakhstan) Shakhter Karagandy	0–0	0–0 (a.e.t.)	**0–0 (1–3 p)**

Only two players scored for Kolos at the European competitions, Yevheniy Novak and Denys Antyukh.

== Reserves and academy ==
=== Kolos-2 ===
Kolos fielded its reserve team in the 2024–25 Ukrainian Second League.

Season	Div.	Pos.	Pl.	W	D	L	GS	GA	P	Ukrainian Cup	Europe		Notes
2024–25	**3rd** (Second League "B")	**1**_{/10}	18	12	3	3	30	14	**39**	-	-	-	The league's play-offs: Probiy Horodenka 0-1 3-2 (3 – 4 p); Promotion play-offs: Podillya Khmelnytskyi 0-2 0-1
2025–26	**3rd** (Second League "B")	**2**_{/11}	30	21	6	3	64	22	**69**	-	-	-	**Promoted to Ukrainian First League**
2026–27	**2nd** (First League)	14_{/16}	4	1	0	3	4	7	3	-	-	-	TBD

=== Youth squads ===
Since 2017 Kolos fields its under-19 squad in youth competitions. Also, in 2019–2021 there existed Kolos U-21 which competed in respective competitions of the Ukrainian Premier League (UPL under-21).

=== Academy and junior squads ===
In 2017 there were formed first junior squads of the Academy. At first there were under-17 and under-15 squads which expanded substantially by 2021.

== Managers ==
- (Ukraine) Kostyantyn Sakharov (2012 – 2014)
- (Ukraine) Ruslan Kostyshyn (6 February 2014 – 29 August 2021)
- (Belarus) Syarhey Kuznyatsow (interim) (29 August 2021 – 28 November 2021)
- (Ukraine) Yaroslav Vyshnyak (28 November 2021 – 28 April 2024)
- (Ukraine) Oleksandr Pozdeyev (28 April 2024 – 10 March 2025)
- (Ukraine) Ruslan Kostyshyn (10 March 2025 – present)
