= 2019–20 FC Oleksandriya season =

FC Oleksandriya
2019–20 season
- President: Serhiy Kuzmenko
- Manager: Volodymyr Sharan
- Stadium: CSC Nika
- Ukrainian Premier League: 5th
- Ukrainian Cup: Quarterfinal
- UEFA Europa League: Group stage
- Top goalscorer: League: Maksym Tretyakov (10); All: Maksym Tretyakov (10)
- Highest home attendance: 7,558 (vs Gent, 3 October 2019)
- Lowest home attendance: 0 (all home matches were played behind closed doors starting 14 March 2020 until 25 July 2020)
- Average home league attendance: 1,167
Home colours	Away colours	Third colours

The 2019–20 season was 8th season in the top Ukrainian football league for FC Oleksandriya. Oleksandriya competed in Premier League, Ukrainian Cup and UEFA Europa League.

== Players ==
=== Squad information ===
As of 25 July 2020

Squad no.	Name	Nationality	Position	Date of birth (age)
Goalkeepers
21	Dmytro Rudyk	(Ukraine)	GK	26 August 1992 (aged 27)
31	Oleh Bilyk ^{List B}	(Ukraine)	GK	11 January 1998 (aged 22)
79	Yuriy Pankiv	(Ukraine)	GK	3 November 1984 (aged 35)
Defenders
2	Oleksandr Melnyk ^{List B}	(Ukraine)	DF	10 February 2000 (aged 20)
3	Artem Hordiyenko	(Ukraine)	DF	4 March 1991 (aged 29)
4	Vladyslav Babohlo ^{List B}	(Ukraine)	DF	14 November 1998 (aged 21)
5	Tymur Stetskov ^{List B}	(Ukraine)	DF	27 January 1998 (aged 22)
11	Denys Miroshnichenko	(Ukraine)	DF	11 October 1994 (aged 25)
13	Hlib Bukhal	(Ukraine)	DF	12 November 1995 (aged 24)
20	Pavel Pashayev	(Azerbaijan) (Ukraine)	DF	4 January 1988 (aged 32)
26	Anton Shendrik	(Ukraine)	DF	26 May 1986 (aged 34)
47	Roman Vantukh (on loan from Dynamo Kyiv)	(Ukraine)	DF	4 July 1998 (aged 22)
55	Kyrylo Prokopchuk ^{List B}	(Ukraine)	DF	14 February 1998 (aged 22)
90	Kaspars Dubra	(Latvia)	DF	20 December 1990 (aged 29)
Midfielders
6	Kyrylo Kovalets	(Ukraine)	MF	2 July 1993 (aged 27)
7	Yevhen Protasov ^{List B}	(Ukraine)	MF	23 July 1997 (aged 23)
8	Oleksiy Dovhyi	(Ukraine)	MF	2 November 1989 (aged 30)
10	Maksym Tretyakov (on loan from DAC 1904 Dunajská Streda)	(Ukraine)	MF	6 March 1996 (aged 24)
17	Valeriy Luchkevych	(Ukraine)	MF	11 January 1996 (aged 24)
22	Vasyl Hrytsuk	(Ukraine)	MF	1 November 1987 (aged 32)
23	Dmytro Shastal	(Ukraine)	MF	30 December 1995 (aged 24)
27	Dmytro Hrechyshkin	(Ukraine)	MF	22 September 1991 (aged 28)
44	Yevhen Banada	(Ukraine)	MF	29 February 1992 (aged 28)
57	João Teixeira	(Portugal) (France)	MF	7 May 1996 (aged 24)
77	Bohdan Myshenko	(Ukraine)	MF	29 December 1994 (aged 25)
94	Maksym Zaderaka	(Ukraine)	MF	7 September 1994 (aged 25)
	Andriy Hloba ^{List B}	(Ukraine)	MF	24 January 1999 (aged 21)
	Maksym Ivakhno ^{List B}	(Ukraine)	MF	17 February 2000 (aged 20)
Forwards
9	Denys Bezborodko	(Ukraine)	FW	31 May 1994 (aged 26)
18	Artem Sitalo	(Ukraine)	FW	1 August 1989 (aged 30)
74	Victor César ^{List B}	(Brazil)	FW	30 March 2000 (aged 20)
99	Denys Ustymenko ^{List B}	(Ukraine)	FW	12 April 1999 (aged 21)
	Andriy Novikov ^{List B}	(Ukraine)	FW	20 April 1999 (aged 21)

== Transfers ==
=== In ===
Date	Pos.	Player	Age	Moving from	Type	Fee	Source
Summer
20 June 2019	DF	(Ukraine) Denys Miroshnichenko	24	(Ukraine) Karpaty Lviv	Transfer	Free	
20 June 2019	FW	(Ukraine) Denys Bezborodko	25	(Ukraine) Shakhtar Donetsk	Transfer	Undisclosed	
22 June 2019	MF	(Ukraine) Valeriy Luchkevych	23	(Belgium) Standard Liège	Transfer	€0.25m	
16 August 2019	DF	(Latvia) Kaspars Dubra	28	(Kazakhstan) Irtysh Pavlodar	Transfer	Free	
2 September 2019	MF	(Portugal) João Teixeira	23	(Romania) Politehnica Iași	Transfer	Undisclosed	
20 June 2019	MF	(Ukraine) Maksym Tretyakov	23	(Slovakia) Dunajská Streda	Loan		
Winter
13 January 2020	MF	(Ukraine) Artem Hordiyenko	28	(Moldova) Sheriff Tiraspol	Transfer	Free	
13 January 2020	MF	(Ukraine) Bohdan Myshenko	25	(Belarus) Torpedo-BelAZ Zhodino	Transfer	Free	
13 January 2020	MF	(Ukraine) Roman Vantukh	21	(Ukraine) Dynamo Kyiv	Loan		
1 January 2020	MF	(Ukraine) Dmytro Semenov	20	(Ukraine) MFC Mykolaiv	Loan return		

=== Out ===
Date	Pos.	Player	Age	Moving to	Type	Fee	Source
Summer
31 May 2019	MF	(Ukraine) Serhiy Rusyan	19	Unattached	Transfer	Free	
31 May 2019	FW	(Ukraine) Orest Tkachuk	21	Unattached	Transfer	Free	
31 May 2019	FW	(Ukraine) Yevhen Verkholantsev	21	Unattached	Transfer	Free	
7 June 2019	DF	(Ukraine) Andriy Tsurikov	29	(Czech Republic) Jablonec	Transfer	Undisclosed	
20 June 2019	MF	(Ukraine) Artem Polyarus	26	(Russia) Khimki	Transfer	Free	
5 July 2019	DF	(Ukraine) Stanislav Mykytsey	29	(Latvia) Jelgava	Transfer	Free	
8 June 2019	MF	(Ukraine) Denys Dedechko	31	(Armenia) Ararat Yerevan	Transfer	Free	
22 July 2019	GK	(Ukraine) Vladyslav Levanidov	26	(Ukraine) Volyn Lutsk	Transfer	Free	
22 July 2019	FW	(Ukraine) Vitaliy Ponomar	29	(Ukraine) Volyn Lutsk	Transfer	Free	
27 July 2019	FW	(Ukraine) Vadym Hranchar	21	(Ukraine) Balkany Zorya	Transfer	Free	
12 September 2019	DF	(Ukraine) Vladyslav Shkinder	20	(Ukraine) FC Uzhhorod	Transfer	Free	
31 May 2019	MF	(Ukraine) Valeriy Luchkevych	23	(Belgium) Standard Liège	Loan return		
31 May 2019	MF	(Ukraine) Vladyslav Kulach	26	(Ukraine) Shakhtar Donetsk	Loan return		
27 July 2019	DF	(Ukraine) Dmytro Semenov	19	(Ukraine) MFC Mykolaiv	Loan		
Winter
31 December 2019	DF	(Ukraine) Maksym Dubenkov	21	Unattached	Transfer	Free	
31 December 2019	DF	(Ukraine) Oleh Sokolov	20	Unattached	Transfer	Free	
31 December 2019	MF	(Ukraine) Maksym Kulish	21	Unattached	Transfer	Free	
31 December 2019	MF	(Ukraine) Bohdan Lytvyak	22	Unattached	Transfer	Free	
22 February 2020	MF	(Ukraine) Stanislav Vasylenko	18	(Ukraine) Obolon-Brovar Kyiv	Transfer	Free	
31 May 2020	MF	(Ukraine) Andriy Zaporozhan	37	Retired	Transfer	Free	
13 March 2020	DF	(Ukraine) Dmytro Semenov	20	(Latvia) FK Jelgava	Transfer		
March 2020	MF	(Ukraine) Kyrylo Dryshlyuk	20	(Latvia) Spartaks Jūrmala	Loan		

== Pre-season and friendlies ==
26 June 2019 Friendly	FC Oleksandriya (Ukraine)	3–4	(Germany) Uerdingen	Tegelen, Netherlands
19:00 EEST (UTC+03:00)	Dovhyi; Bezborodko; Zaderaka	Report	Rodríguez 32'; Beister 57'; Pflücke; Evina	Stadium: Irene sport club

28 June 2019 Friendly	Anderlecht (Belgium)	1–2	(Ukraine) FC Oleksandriya	Brussels, Belgium
19:00 EEST (UTC+03:00)	Amuzu 15' (pen.)	Report	Kovalets; Miroshnichenko	Stadium: Anderlecht training base

29 June 2019 Friendly	AZ Alkmaar (Netherlands)	0–3	(Ukraine) FC Oleksandriya	Alkmaar, Netherlands
17:00 EEST (UTC+03:00)		Report	Hrechyshkin 21' (pen.); Dovhyi 56'; Kovalets 82'	Stadium: AZ training base

2 July 2019 Friendly	FC Oleksandriya (Ukraine)	2–1	(Germany) MSV Duisburg	Tegelen, Netherlands
19:00 EEST (UTC+03:00)	Prokopchuk 84'; Shastal 86'	Report	64'	Stadium: Irene sport club

6 July 2019 Friendly	FC Oleksandriya (Ukraine)	2–2	(Belgium) Standard Liège	Tegelen, Netherlands
15:30 EEST (UTC+03:00)	Dovhyi 18'; Tretyakov 34'	Report	Carcela 12'; Lestienne 64'	Stadium: Irene sport club

14 July 2019 Friendly	FC Oleksandriya (Ukraine)	1–0	(North Macedonia) FK Borec	Bansko, Bulgaria
12:00 EEST (UTC+03:00)	Zaporozhan (pen.)	Report		Stadium: Evima football

16 July 2019 Friendly	FC Oleksandriya (Ukraine)	0–2	(Cyprus) AEL Limassol	Sofia, Bulgaria
16:00 EEST (UTC+03:00)		Report	Aganovic 38'; Jurado 63'	Stadium: Bulgaria national team training facility

19 July 2019 Friendly	FC Oleksandriya (Ukraine)	5–0	(Turkmenistan) Altyn Asyr	Bansko, Bulgaria
17:00 EEST (UTC+03:00)	Kovalets 13'; Hrechyshkin 18' (pen.); Luchkevych 20'; Ustymenko 67'; Alibekov 88'	Report		Stadium: Evima football

25 July 2019 Friendly	FC Oleksandriya (Ukraine)	2–1	(Ukraine) SC Dnipro-1	Oleksandriya
18:00 EEST (UTC+03:00)	Shastal 48'; Zaderaka 55'	Report	Korkishko 64' (pen.)	Stadium: CSC Nika Stadium; Referee: Viktor Kopiyevskyi

13 October 2019 Friendly	SC Dnipro-1 (Ukraine)	2–1	(Ukraine) FC Oleksandriya	Dnipro
14:00 EEST (UTC+03:00)	Buletsa 26', 50'	Report	Bezborodko 12'	Stadium: Dnipro-Arena; Referee: Maksym Kozyryatskyi

18 January 2020 Friendly	FC Oleksandriya (Ukraine)	4–0	(Bulgaria) Botev Plovdiv	Turkey
16:00 EET (UTC+02:00)	Ustymenko 28'; Shastal 51'; Zaderaka 66'; Luchkevych 81'	Report

19 January 2020 Friendly	FC Oleksandriya (Ukraine)	2–2	(Bulgaria) Slavia Sofia	Alanya, Turkey
16:00 EET (UTC+02:00)	Hrytsuk 34' (pen.); Bezborodko 71'	Report	Kirilov 38'; Tasevski 59'	Stadium: Goldsity

21 January 2020 Friendly	FC Oleksandriya (Ukraine)	3–1	(Bulgaria) Cherno More Varna	Alanya, Turkey
15:30 EET (UTC+02:00)	Ustymenko 98', 102'; Shastal 110'	Report	Angelov 36'	Stadium: Goldsity

24 January 2020 Friendly	FC Oleksandriya (Ukraine)	5–0	(North Macedonia) Makedonija Gjorče Petrov	Alanya, Turkey
16:00 EET (UTC+02:00)	Vantukh 13'; Hrytsuk 55' (pen.); Shastal 69', 86'; Bezborodko 90+1' (pen.)	Report		Stadium: Goldsity

26 January 2020 Friendly	FC Oleksandriya (Ukraine)	5–2	(Armenia) Pyunik Yerevan	Alanya, Turkey
16:00 EET (UTC+02:00)	Ustymenko 11'; Bezborodko 23'; Sitalo 47', 70'; Tretyakov 61' (pen.)	Report	Shendrik 29' (o.g.); Yedigaryan 68'	Stadium: Goldsity

3 February 2020 Friendly	FC Oleksandriya (Ukraine)	1–0	(Kazakhstan) Kaysar Kyzylorda	Belek, Turkey
16:00 EET (UTC+02:00)	Protasov 37'	Report

6 February 2020 Friendly	FC Oleksandriya (Ukraine)	2–1	(Bulgaria) Levski Sofia	Belek, Turkey
14:00 EET (UTC+02:00)	Sitalo 33'; Zaderaka 60'	Report	Kostov 76' (pen.)

9 February 2020 Friendly	FC Oleksandriya (Ukraine)	0–2	(Kazakhstan) Atyrau	Turkey
11:00 EET (UTC+02:00)		Report	Tastanbekov 26' (pen.); Alex Bruno 38'

9 February 2020 Friendly	FC Oleksandriya (Ukraine)	2–0	(Kazakhstan) Kyzylzhar	Turkey
16:00 EET (UTC+02:00)	Tretyakov 63'; Myshenko 71'	Report

12 February 2020 Friendly	FC Oleksandriya (Ukraine)	0–1	(Georgia (country)) Dinamo Tbilisi	Turkey
16:00 EET (UTC+02:00)		Report	87'

12 February 2020 Friendly	FC Oleksandriya (Ukraine)	1–2	(Ukraine) SC Dnipro-1	Belek, Turkey
18:30 EET (UTC+02:00)	Hrytsuk 30'	Report	Supriaha 10'; Buletsa 56'	Stadium: Susesi Luxury Resort

12 February 2020 Friendly	FC Oleksandriya (Ukraine)	1–2	(Ukraine) SC Dnipro-1	Belek, Turkey
18:30 EET (UTC+02:00)	Hrytsuk 30'	Report	Supriaha 10'; Buletsa 56'	Stadium: Susesi Luxury Resort

22 May 2020 Friendly	FC Oleksandriya (Ukraine)	4–2	(Ukraine) Vorskla Poltava	Oleksandriya
14:00 EEST (UTC+03:00)	Bukhal 20', 30'; Ustymenko 83', 88'	Report	Rebenok 17'; Opanasenko 81'	Stadium: CSC Nika Stadium; Referee: Viktor Kopiyevskyi

26 May 2020 Friendly	FC Oleksandriya (Ukraine)	5–0	(Ukraine) FC Cherkashchyna	Oleksandriya
17:00 EEST (UTC+03:00)	Hrechyshkin 34'; Kovalets 37'; Zaderaka 65'; Melnyk 80'; Bezborodko 83'	Report		Stadium: CSC Nika Stadium; Referee: Viktor Kopiyevskyi

10 June 2020 Friendly	FC Oleksandriya (Ukraine)	2–0	(Ukraine) FC Cherkashchyna	Oleksandriya
EEST (UTC+03:00)	Bezborodko; Myshenko	Report		Stadium: CSC Nika Stadium

== Competitions ==
=== Overall ===
Competition	First match	Last match	Starting round	Final position	Record							
Competition	First match	Last match	Starting round	Final position	Pld	W	D	L	GF	GA	GD	Win %
Ukrainian Premier League	31 July 2019	25 July 2020	Matchday 1	5th	33	14	7	12	50	49	+1	42.42
Ukrainian Cup	25 September 2019	11 March 2020	Third Preliminary round (1/16)	Quarterfinal	3	1	1	1	2	2	+0	33.33
UEFA Europa League	19 September 2019	12 December 2019	Group stage	4th	6	0	3	3	6	10	−4	0.00
Total					42	15	11	16	58	61	−3	35.71

Last updated: 25 July 2020
Source: Competitions

=== Premier League ===
==== League table ====
Pos	Team	Pld	W	D	L	GF	GA	GD	Pts	Qualification or relegation
2	Dynamo Kyiv	32	18	5	9	65	35	+30	59	Qualification for the Champions League third qualifying round
3	Zorya Luhansk	32	17	7	8	50	29	+21	58	Qualification for the Europa League group stage
4	Desna Chernihiv	32	17	5	10	59	33	+26	56	Qualification for the Europa League third qualifying round
5	FC Oleksandriya	32	14	7	11	49	47	+2	49	Qualification for the playoff for Europa League second qualifying round
6	Kolos Kovalivka (O)	32	10	2	20	33	59	−26	32	Qualification for the playoff for Europa League second qualifying round

Source: Ukrainian Premier League, UEFA, Soccerway
Rules for classification: 1) Points; 2) Head-to-head points; 3) Head-to-head goal difference; 4) Head-to-head higher number of goals scored; 5) Goal difference; 6) Higher number of goals scored; 7) Draw or "golden match" if tied for title (Article 22, paragraph 3).
(O) Play-off winners

==== Results summary ====
Overall								Home						Away					
Pld	W	D	L	GF	GA	GD	Pts	W	D	L	GF	GA	GD	W	D	L	GF	GA	GD
33	14	7	12	50	49	+1	49	9	2	6	29	27	+2	5	5	6	21	22	−1

Last updated: 25 July 2020.
Source: Competitive matches

==== Results by round ====
Round	1	2	3	4	5	6	7	8	9	10	11	12	13	14	15	16	17	18	19	20	21	22	23	24	25	26	27	28	29	30	31	32
Ground	H	A	H	A	H	A	H	A	H	H	A	A	H	A	H	A	H	A	H	A	A	H	H	H	A	H	A	A	A	H	A	H
Result	L	L	W	W	L	W	W	D	W	W	L	D	W	D	W	L	W	W	L	D	W	L	W	W	L	L	L	L	D	D	W	D
Position	10	9	9	6	8	4	3	3	4	4	4	5	5	5	5	5	5	5	5	5	5	5	5	5	5	5	5	5	5	5	5	5

Updated to match(es) played on 19 July 2020. Source: Competitive matches
A = Away; H = Home; W = Win; D = Draw; L = Loss

==== Matches ====
31 July 2019 1	FC Oleksandriya	1–3	Shakhtar Donetsk	Oleksandriya
19:00 EEST (UTC+03:00)	Tretyakov 42'; Zaporozhan (yellow card) 76'	Report	Bukhal 58' (o.g.); Stepanenko (yellow card) 71'; Taison 73'; Alan Patrick (yellow card) 86'; Dentinho 90+1'	Stadium: CSC Nika Stadium; Attendance: 4,004; Referee: Anatoliy Abdula

3 August 2019 2	FC Mariupol	2–1	FC Oleksandriya	Mariupol
19:00 EEST (UTC+03:00)	Vakula (yellow card) 19', (goal) 83'; Fomin 77' (pen.)	Report	Miroshnichenko (yellow card) 11'; Babohlo (yellow card) 45'; Bezborodko (yellow card) 56'; Kovalets (yellow card) 79'; Sitalo 90+5'	Stadium: Volodymyr Boiko Stadium; Attendance: 3,173; Referee: Yuriy Mozharovskyi

10 August 2019 3	FC Oleksandriya	2–1	Olimpik Donetsk	Oleksandriya
19:30 EEST (UTC+03:00)	Bezborodko (yellow card) 29', (goal) 61'; Shendrik 43'; Bukhal (yellow card) 51' (yellow-red card) 74'; Banada (yellow card) 66'; Pashayev (yellow card) 90+3'	Report	Zahedi (yellow card) 15'; Vantukh (yellow card) 33' (yellow-red card) 59'; Salou (yellow card) 48'; Dieye 56'; Yevhen Pasich (yellow card) 72'	Stadium: CSC Nika Stadium; Attendance: 1,602; Referee: Andriy Kovalenko

18 August 2019 4	Zorya Luhansk	1–2	FC Oleksandriya	Zaporizhia
19:30 EEST (UTC+03:00)	Tymchyk (yellow card) 31'; Cheberko (yellow card) 59'; Rusyn (yellow card) 71'; Abu Hanna (yellow card) 83'; Lyednyev 88'	Report	Banada (yellow card) 22'; Luchkevych (yellow card) 36'; Kovalets 57', 75', (yellow card) 80'; Pashayev (yellow card) 70'	Stadium: Slavutych-Arena; Attendance: 1,974; Referee: Mykola Balakin

24 August 2019 5	FC Oleksandriya	0–3	Desna Chernihiv	Oleksandriya
17:00 EEST (UTC+03:00)	Miroshnichenko (yellow card) 16' (yellow-red card) 48'; Luchkevych (yellow card) 30'; Banada (yellow card) 42'; Shastal (yellow card) 89'	Report	Denys Favorov (yellow card) 33', (goal) 50' (pen.); Bohdanov (yellow card) 45+1'; Kuzyk 69'; Imerekov (yellow card) 83'; Filippov 90'	Stadium: CSC Nika Stadium; Attendance: 1,612; Referee: Ivan Bondar

31 August 2019 6	Vorskla Poltava	0–1	FC Oleksandriya	Poltava
17:00 EEST (UTC+03:00)	Bayenko (yellow card) 24'; Petrović (yellow card) 54'; Luizão (yellow card) 74'	Report	Shastal 23'; Pashayev (yellow card) 34'; Dubra (yellow card) 47'; Dovhyi (yellow card) 90+2'; Bukhal (yellow card) 90+3'	Stadium: Vorskla Stadium; Attendance: 6,075; Referee: Yaroslav Kozyk

14 September 2019 7	FC Oleksandriya	2–0	SC Dnipro-1	Oleksandriya
14:00 EEST (UTC+03:00)	Tretyakov (yellow card) 42'; Dovhyi 54'; Hrechyshkin (yellow card) 71'; Sitalo 76'	Report	Buletsa (yellow card) 74'	Stadium: CSC Nika Stadium; Attendance: 1,373; Referee: Andriy Kovalenko

22 September 2019 8	Kolos Kovalivka	1–1	FC Oleksandriya	Kyiv
EEST (UTC+03:00)	Volkov (yellow card) 13'; Milko (yellow card) 39'; Kostyshyn 45' (pen.); Orikhovskyi (yellow card) 47'	Report	Stetskov (yellow card) 25'; Shendrik (yellow card) 45+4'; Babohlo 68'	Stadium: Obolon Arena; Attendance: 2,100; Referee: Dmytro Kryvushkin

28 September 2019 9	FC Oleksandriya	2–0	FC Lviv	Oleksandriya
19:30 EEST (UTC+03:00)	Banada 35', (yellow card) 54'; Miroshnichenko (yellow card) 40'; Hrechyshkin (yellow card) 72'; Bezborodko 90+2'	Report	Pedro Vitor (yellow card) 8'; Marthã (yellow card) 72'	Stadium: CSC Nika Stadium; Attendance: 1,297; Referee: Vitaliy Romanov

6 October 2019 10	FC Oleksandriya	2–1	Karpaty Lviv	Oleksandriya
19:30 EEST (UTC+03:00)	Stetskov (yellow card) 7'; Hrechyshkin 50'; Babohlo 82'; Bezborodko (yellow card) 83'; Miroshnichenko (yellow card) 90+2'	Report	Hall 58', (yellow card) 90+2'; Dubinchak (yellow card) 64'; Verbnyi (yellow card) 75'	Stadium: CSC Nika Stadium; Attendance: 1,132; Referee: Yuriy Ivanov

20 October 2019 11	Dynamo Kyiv	1–0	FC Oleksandriya	Kyiv
17:00 EEST (UTC+03:00)	Mykolenko 32'; Tsyhankov (yellow card) 37'	Report	Bezborodko (yellow card) 25'	Stadium: NSC Olimpiyskiy; Attendance: 16,447; Referee: Mykola Balakin

27 October 2019 12	Shakhtar Donetsk	0–0	FC Oleksandriya	Kharkiv
17:00 EET (UTC+02:00)	Tetê (yellow card) 53'; Stepanenko (yellow card) 58'; Alan Patrick (red card) 75'; Khocholava (yellow card) 82'	Report	Hrechyshkin (yellow card) 45'; Banada (yellow card) 75'; Shastal (yellow card) 77' (yellow-red card) 84'; Babohlo (yellow card) 78'; Dovhyi (yellow card) 89'	Stadium: OSC Metalist; Attendance: 5,741; Referee: Vitaliy Romanov

3 November 2019 13	FC Oleksandriya	3–1	FC Mariupol	Oleksandriya
14:00 EET (UTC+02:00)	Babohlo (yellow card) 38'; Bezborodko 55'; Kovalets 57'; Korniyenko 69' (o.g.)	Report	Bykov (yellow card) 28' (yellow-red card) 32'; Dawa (yellow card) 43'; Vakula (yellow card) 49'; Churko 71'; Chobotenko (yellow card) 78'	Stadium: CSC Nika Stadium; Attendance: 935; Referee: Dmytro Bondarenko

10 November 2019 14	Olimpik Donetsk	0–0	FC Oleksandriya	Kyiv
19:30 EET (UTC+02:00)	Zotko (yellow card) 28'; Hryshko (yellow card) 84'; Fabinho (yellow card) 90+3'	Report	Pankiv (red card) 79'; Kovalets (yellow card) 55'; Babohlo (yellow card) 58'; Dovhyi (yellow card) 66'; Bilyk (yellow card) 90+3'	Stadium: Dynamo Stadium; Attendance: 350; Referee: Serhiy Boyko

23 November 2019 15	FC Oleksandriya	1–0	Zorya Luhansk	Oleksandriya
14:00 EET (UTC+02:00)	Banada (yellow card) 37', (goal) 60'; Bukhal (yellow card) 51'; Zaderaka (yellow card) 84'	Report	Mykhaylychenko (yellow card) 22'; Abu Hanna (yellow card) 90+2'	Stadium: CSC Nika Stadium; Attendance: 937; Referee: Dmytro Kutakov

1 December 2019 16	Desna Chernihiv	2–0	FC Oleksandriya	Chernihiv
14:00 EET (UTC+02:00)	Filippov (yellow card) 27', (goal) 60'; Khlyobas 46'	Report	Banada (yellow card) 12'; Stetskov (yellow card) 63'	Stadium: Chernihiv Stadium; Attendance: 2,081; Referee: Yevhen Aranovskyi

7 December 2019 17	FC Oleksandriya	3–0	Vorskla Poltava	Oleksandriya
14:00 EET (UTC+02:00)	Pashayev (yellow card) 17'; Luchkevych (yellow card) 54'; Zaporozhan 59' (pen.); Kovalets 75', 85'	Report	Vasin (yellow card) 48'; Kolomoyets (yellow card) 62'; Artur (yellow card) 67'; Ndiaye (yellow card) 84'; Ochigava (yellow card) 89'	Stadium: CSC Nika Stadium; Attendance: 911; Referee: Yuriy Mozharovskyi

15 December 2019 18	SC Dnipro-1	1–2	FC Oleksandriya	Dnipro
17:00 EET (UTC+02:00)	Kravchenko (yellow card) 14'; Vakulko (yellow card) 28'; Kohut (yellow card) 35'; Lopyryonok (yellow card) 70' (yellow-red card) 79'; Gueye (yellow card) 87'; Kulish 90' (pen.); Nazarenko (red card) 90+1'	Report	Zaporozhan (yellow card) 20'; Stetskov (yellow card) 30'; Miroshnichenko (yellow card) 62'; Tretyakov 80' (pen.), 90+3' (pen.); Luchkevych (yellow card) 88'	Stadium: Dnipro-Arena; Attendance: 1,937; Referee: Mykola Balakin

23 February 2020 19	FC Oleksandriya	1–2	Kolos Kovalivka	Oleksandriya
14:00 EET (UTC+02:00)	Babohlo (yellow card) 31'; Dovhyi (yellow card) 53'; Sitalo 61', (yellow card) 77'	Report	Smyrnyi 46', 90+2', (yellow card) 90+2'; Petrov (yellow card) 64'; Bondarenko (yellow card) 76'; Volynets (yellow card) 76'	Stadium: CSC Nika Stadium; Attendance: 1,197; Referee: Yuriy Ivanov

29 February 2020 20	FC Lviv	1–1	FC Oleksandriya	Lviv
14:00 EET (UTC+02:00)	Tatarkov (yellow card) 20' (yellow-red card) 53'; Bopesu (yellow card) 64'; Alvaro 87'; Rafael Sabino (yellow card) 90+2'	Report	Myshenko 10', (yellow card) 15'; Shendrik (yellow card) 69'	Stadium: Ukraina Stadium; Attendance: 920; Referee: Anatoliy Abdula

4 March 2020 21	Karpaty Lviv	0–4	FC Oleksandriya	Lviv
19:30 EET (UTC+02:00)	Kozak (yellow card) 13'; Hall (yellow card) 31'; Nazaryna (yellow card) 59'	Report	Tretyakov 37' (pen.), 58'; Miroshnichenko (yellow card) 50'; Sitalo 73'; Banada 90'; Dovhyi (yellow card) 90+1'	Stadium: Ukraina Stadium; Attendance: 1,116; Referee: Dmytro Kryvushkin

7 March 2020 22	FC Oleksandriya	1–3	Dynamo Kyiv	Oleksandriya
17:00 EET (UTC+02:00)	Zaderaka (yellow card) 17'; Stetskov (yellow card) 32'; Dovhyi (yellow card) 36' (yellow-red card) 47'; Pankiv (yellow card) 45'; Hrechyshkin 62' (pen.)	Report	Shabanov 45'; Sydorchuk (yellow card) 49'; Mykolenko (yellow card) 51', (goal) 85'; Buyalskyi 60'; Karavayev (yellow card) 79'	Stadium: CSC Nika Stadium; Attendance: 3,780; Referee: Yuriy Mozharovskyi

14 March 2020 23	FC Oleksandriya	4–2	Kolos Kovalivka	Oleksandriya
17:00 EET (UTC+02:00)	Bezborodko (yellow card) 6'; Hrechyshkin 45+1'; Hrytsuk 54' (pen.); Babohlo (yellow card) 61'; Kovalets 64'; Zaderaka 90'; Luchkevych (yellow card) 90+3'	Report	Orikhovskyi (yellow card) 3'; Vilhjálmsson (yellow card) 24'; Sorokin 35', (yellow card) 45'; Maksymenko (yellow card) 54'; Lysenko 80'; Yefremov (yellow card) 84'	Stadium: CSC Nika Stadium; Attendance: 0 Referee: Ihor Paskhal
Note: Match was played behind closed doors due to quarantine in Ukraine during COVID-19 pandemic.

30 May 2020 24	FC Oleksandriya	1–0	Zorya Luhansk	Oleksandriya
17:00 EET (UTC+02:00)	Pashayev (yellow card) 45+1'; Hrechyshkin 90+4' (pen.)	Report	Lyednyev (yellow card) 70'; Lunyov (yellow card) 76'; Mykhaylychenko (yellow card) 81' (yellow-red card) 84'; Vernydub (yellow card) 89'	Stadium: CSC Nika Stadium; Attendance: 0 Referee: Yevhen Aranovskyi
Note: Match was played behind closed doors due to quarantine in Ukraine during COVID-19 pandemic.

7 June 2020 25	Dynamo Kyiv	5–1	FC Oleksandriya	Kyiv
17:00 EEST (UTC+03:00)	Sydorchuk (yellow card) 7'; Buyalskyi 14', 83'; Rusyn 21' (pen.); Kadiri (yellow card) 31'; Shepelyev (yellow card) 45+2'; Andriyevskyi (yellow card) 50'; Mykolenko 65'; De Pena 81'	Report	Dubra (yellow card) 20' (yellow-red card) 55'; Banada (yellow card) 25'; Hrechyshkin 31' (pen.)	Stadium: NSC Olimpiyskiy; Attendance: 0 Referee: Vitaliy Romanov
Note: Match was played behind closed doors due to quarantine in Ukraine during COVID-19 pandemic.

14 June 2020 26	FC Oleksandriya	1–5	Desna Chernihiv	Oleksandriya
19:30 EEST (UTC+03:00)	Bukhal (yellow card) 43'; Tretyakov 46'; Babohlo (yellow card) 55' (yellow-red card) 60'; Vantukh (yellow card) 69'	Report	Filippov 29', 79' (pen.); Kalitvintsev 44'; Hitchenko 56'; Totovytskyi 90+5'	Stadium: CSC Nika Stadium; Attendance: 0 Referee: Yevhen Aranovskyi
Note: Match was played behind closed doors due to quarantine in Ukraine during COVID-19 pandemic.

20 June 2020 27	Shakhtar Donetsk	3–2	FC Oleksandriya	Kyiv
19:30 EEST (UTC+03:00)	Taison 13' (pen.); Dodô (yellow card) 45'; Tetê 59', 79'	Report	Shendrik (yellow card) 12'; Banada 47'; Tretyakov 51' (pen.); Pashayev (yellow card) 59'; Shastal (yellow card) 65'	Stadium: NSC Olimpiyskiy; Attendance: 0 Referee: Ihor Paskhal
Note: Match was played behind closed doors due to quarantine in Ukraine during COVID-19 pandemic.

27 June 2020 28	Kolos Kovalivka	2–1	FC Oleksandriya	Kyiv
17:00 EEST (UTC+03:00)	Lysenko 20', 29'; Morozko (yellow card) 49'; Zozulya (yellow card) 79'; Bohdanov (yellow card) 89'	Report	Miroshnichenko (yellow card) 23'; Kovalets 47', (yellow card) 83'; Banada (yellow card) 77'; Tretyakov (yellow card) 82'	Stadium: Obolon Arena; Attendance: 0 Referee: Dmytro Bondarenko
Note: Match was played behind closed doors due to quarantine in Ukraine during COVID-19 pandemic.

5 July 2020 29	Zorya Luhansk	2–2	FC Oleksandriya	Zaporizhia
19:30 EEST (UTC+03:00)	Cheberko (yellow card) 16'; Khomchenovskyi 45'; Yurchenko 54' (pen.); Abu Hanna (yellow card) 76'	Report	Bezborodko (yellow card) 14'; Luchkevych 19'; Banada (yellow card) 67'; Tretyakov 76' (pen.); Pankiv (yellow card) 90+4'	Stadium: Slavutych-Arena; Attendance: 0 Referee: Kateryna Monzul
Note: Match was played behind closed doors due to quarantine in Ukraine during COVID-19 pandemic.

12 July 2020 30	FC Oleksandriya	2–2	Dynamo Kyiv	Oleksandriya
19:30 EEST (UTC+03:00)	Babohlo (yellow card) 8'; Tretyakov 23' (pen.), 89' (pen.); Kovalets (yellow card) 90'	Report	Syrota (yellow card) 1'; Sydorchuk (yellow card) 15'; Tsyhankov (yellow card) 49'; Verbič 64', 75'; Andriyevskyi (yellow card) 84'; Karavayev (yellow card) 90'	Stadium: CSC Nika Stadium; Attendance: 0 Referee: Vitaliy Romanov
Note: Match was played behind closed doors due to quarantine in Ukraine during COVID-19 pandemic.

16 July 2020 31	Desna Chernihiv	1–3	FC Oleksandriya	Chernihiv
19:00 EEST (UTC+03:00)	Tamm 8'; Zapadnya (yellow card) 37'	Report	Shastal 32', (yellow card) 54'; Myshenko 57'; Zaderaka 61'	Stadium: Chernihiv Stadium; Attendance: 0 Referee: Maksym Kozyriatskyi
Note: Match was played behind closed doors due to quarantine in Ukraine during COVID-19 pandemic.

19 July 2020 32	FC Oleksandriya	2–2	Shakhtar Donetsk	Oleksandriya
19:30 EEST (UTC+03:00)	Bezborodko (yellow card) 58'; Dovhyi 89'; Banada 90'	Report	Sikan (yellow card) 21'; Tetê 24'; Solomon 32'; Dentinho (yellow card) 83'; Mudryk (yellow card) 85'	Stadium: CSC Nika Stadium; Attendance: 0 Referee: Dmytro Bondarenko
Note: Match was played behind closed doors due to quarantine in Ukraine during COVID-19 pandemic.

==== Play-off round ====
25 July 2020 Play-off	FC Oleksandriya	1–2	FC Mariupol	Oleksandriya
19:30 EEST (UTC+03:00)	Bezborodko 35'	Report	Polehenko 28'; Fomin (yellow card) 69'; Kashchuk 83'; Halchuk (yellow card) 90+2'	Stadium: CSC Nika Stadium; Attendance: 1,070; Referee: Anatoliy Abdula

=== Ukrainian Cup ===
25 September 2019 3rd preliminary round	Dinaz Vyshhorod	0–1	FC Oleksandriya	Demydiv
15:00 EET (UTC+02:00)	Dmytrenko (yellow card) 8'; Harbar (yellow card) 83' (yellow-red card) 113'; Petrenko (yellow card) 90'	Report	Dubenkov (yellow card) 92'; Hloba 104'; Ivakhno (yellow card) 113'; Prokopchuk (yellow card) 116'; Novikov (yellow card) 118'	Stadium: Dinaz Stadium; Attendance: 350; Referee: Yuriy Ivanov

30 October 2019 Round of 16 (1/8)	FC Oleksandriya	1–1 (5 – 4 p)	Zorya Luhansk	Oleksandriya
18:00 EET (UTC+02:00)	Kovalets (yellow card) 20'; Ivanisenya 78' (o.g.); Babohlo (yellow card) 88'; Bezborodko (yellow card) 117'	Report	Mykhaylychenko (yellow card) 26'; Lyednyev 29'; Tymchyk (yellow card) 32'; Cheberko (yellow card) 110'	Stadium: CSC Nika Stadium; Attendance: 1,061; Referee: Ihor Paskhal
	Penalties
	Bukhal (penalty scored); Hrechyshkin (penalty scored); Miroshnichenko (penalty missed); Babohlo (penalty scored); Stetskov (penalty scored); Bezborodko (penalty scored)		Vernydub (penalty scored); Lyednyev (penalty scored); Yurchenko (penalty scored); Ivanisenya (penalty scored); Kocherhin (penalty missed); Kabayev (penalty missed)

11 March 2020 Quarterfinal	Dynamo Kyiv	1–0	FC Oleksandriya	Kyiv
19:30 EET (UTC+02:00)	Kadiri (yellow card) 45' (yellow-red card) 55'; Sydorchuk (yellow card) 55'; Popov (yellow card) 84'; Tsyhankov 106'	Report	Bukhal (yellow card) 58'; Dovhyi (yellow card) 74'; Miroshnichenko (yellow card) 105'; Hrechyshkin (yellow card) 120+3'; Shendrik (yellow card) 120+3'	Stadium: NSC Olimpiyskiy; Attendance: 9,567; Referee: Vitaliy Romanov

=== UEFA Europa League ===
==== Group stage ====
Pos	Team	Pld	W	D	L	GF	GA	GD	Pts	Qualification	GNT	WLF	STE	OLE
1	(Belgium) Gent	6	3	3	0	11	7	+4	12	Advance to knockout phase	—	2–2	3–2	2–1
2	(Germany) VfL Wolfsburg	6	3	2	1	9	7	+2	11	Advance to knockout phase	1–3	—	1–0	3–1
3	(France) Saint-Étienne	6	0	4	2	6	8	−2	4		0–0	1–1	—	1–1
4	(Ukraine) Oleksandriya	6	0	3	3	6	10	−4	3		1–1	0–1	2–2	—

Source: UEFA
Rules for classification: Group stage tiebreakers

19 September 2019 1	VfL Wolfsburg (Germany)	3–1	(Ukraine) FC Oleksandriya	Wolfsburg, Germany
22:00 EEST (UTC+03:00)	Arnold 20'; Mehmedi 24'; Brekalo 67'	Report	Banada 66', (yellow card) 81'; Dubra (yellow card) 89'	Stadium: Volkswagen Arena; Attendance: 10,112; Referee: Halis Özkahya

3 October 2019 2	FC Oleksandriya (Ukraine)	1–1	(Belgium) KAA Gent	Lviv
20:00 EEST (UTC+03:00)	Sitalo 60'	Report	Depoitre 6'	Stadium: Arena Lviv; Attendance: 7,588; Referee: Jens Maae

24 October 2019 3	Saint-Étienne (France)	1–1	(Ukraine) FC Oleksandriya	Saint-Étienne, France
20:00 EEST (UTC+03:00)	Gabriel Silva 8', (yellow card) 49'	Report	Gabriel Silva 14' (o.g.); Miroshnichenko (yellow card) 40'; Shastal (yellow card) 90+3'	Stadium: Stade Geoffroy-Guichard; Attendance: 28,573; Referee: Espen Eskås

7 November 2019 4	FC Oleksandriya (Ukraine)	2–2	(France) Saint-Étienne	Lviv
22:00 EET (UTC+02:00)	Pankiv (yellow card) 23'; Bezborodko 84'; Zaderaka 90+1'	Report	Khazri 24' (pen.); Fofana (yellow card) 43'; Youssouf (yellow card) 68'; Camara 73'	Stadium: Arena Lviv; Attendance: 6,361; Referee: João Pinheiro

28 November 2019 5	FC Oleksandriya (Ukraine)	0–1	(Germany) VfL Wolfsburg	Lviv
20:00 EET (UTC+02:00)	Pashayev (yellow card) 45'; Bezborodko (yellow card) 71'	Report	Bruma (yellow card) 19'; Weghorst 45+1' (pen.); Roussillon (yellow card) 69'; William (yellow card) 88'	Stadium: Arena Lviv; Attendance: 7,118; Referee: Manuel Schuettengruber

12 December 2019 6	KAA Gent (Belgium)	2–1	(Ukraine) FC Oleksandriya	Ghent, Belgium
22:00 EET (UTC+02:00)	Depoitre 7', 16'; Castro-Montes (yellow card) 70'; Kums (yellow card) 90+1'	Report	Miroshnichenko 54'; Kovalets (yellow card) 79'	Stadium: Ghelamco Arena; Attendance: 13,156; Referee: Radu Petrescu

== Statistics ==
=== Appearances and goals ===
No.	Pos	Nat	Player	Total		Premier League		Cup		Europa League	
No.	Pos	Nat	Player	Apps	Goals	Apps	Goals	Apps	Goals	Apps	Goals
Goalkeepers
31	GK	(Ukraine) UKR	Oleh Bilyk	9	0	6+1	0	2	0	0	0
79	GK	(Ukraine) UKR	Yuriy Pankiv	34	0	27	0	1	0	6	0
Defenders
2	DF	(Ukraine) UKR	Oleksandr Melnyk	2	0	1	0	1	0	0	0
3	DF	(Ukraine) UKR	Artem Hordiyenko	9	0	4+5	0	0	0	0	0
4	DF	(Ukraine) UKR	Vladyslav Babohlo	22	2	16+2	2	1	0	2+1	0
5	DF	(Ukraine) UKR	Tymur Stetskov	16	0	9+4	0	2	0	0+1	0
11	DF	(Ukraine) UKR	Denys Miroshnichenko	35	1	25+2	0	2	0	6	1
13	DF	(Ukraine) UKR	Hlib Bukhal	28	0	17+5	0	2	0	4	0
20	DF	(Azerbaijan) AZE	Pavel Pashayev	27	0	16+5	0	0	0	6	0
26	DF	(Ukraine) UKR	Anton Shendrik	11	1	7+3	1	0+1	0	0	0
47	DF	(Ukraine) UKR	Roman Vantukh	7	0	5+2	0	0	0	0	0
55	DF	(Ukraine) UKR	Kyrylo Prokopchuk	2	0	0+1	0	1	0	0	0
90	DF	(Latvia) LVA	Kaspars Dubra	34	0	27	0	1	0	6	0
Midfielders
6	MF	(Ukraine) UKR	Kyrylo Kovalets	30	7	18+5	7	1	0	5+1	0
7	MF	(Ukraine) UKR	Yevhen Protasov	7	0	2+3	0	1	0	0+1	0
8	MF	(Ukraine) UKR	Oleksiy Dovhyi	22	2	11+5	2	1+1	0	1+3	0
10	MF	(Ukraine) UKR	Maksym Tretyakov	37	10	27+3	10	1	0	5+1	0
16	MF	(Ukraine) UKR	Kyrylo Dryshlyuk	2	0	0	0	2	0	0	0
17	MF	(Ukraine) UKR	Valeriy Luchkevych	37	1	29+1	1	1	0	6	0
22	MF	(Ukraine) UKR	Vasyl Hrytsuk	17	1	5+11	1	0+1	0	0	0
23	MF	(Ukraine) UKR	Dmytro Shastal	25	2	8+11	2	1	0	2+3	0
27	MF	(Ukraine) UKR	Dmytro Hrechyshkin	38	5	29+1	5	1+1	0	6	0
44	MF	(Ukraine) UKR	Yevhen Banada	36	6	22+7	5	2	0	5	1
57	MF	(Portugal) POR	João Teixeira	5	0	0+2	0	2	0	0+1	0
77	MF	(Ukraine) UKR	Bohdan Myshenko	8	2	4+3	2	1	0	0	0
94	MF	(Ukraine) UKR	Maksym Zaderaka	30	3	11+14	2	0+2	0	0+3	1
	MF	(Ukraine) UKR	Andriy Hloba	1	1	0	0	0+1	1	0	0
	MF	(Ukraine) UKR	Maksym Ivakhno	1	0	0	0	0+1	0	0	0
Forwards
9	FW	(Ukraine) UKR	Denys Bezborodko	30	5	16+8	4	1+1	0	1+3	1
18	FW	(Ukraine) UKR	Artem Sitalo	28	5	14+9	4	1+1	0	3	1
99	FW	(Ukraine) UKR	Denys Ustymenko	3	0	0+2	0	1	0	0	0
	FW	(Ukraine) UKR	Andriy Novikov	1	0	0	0	0+1	0	0	0
Players transferred out during the season
15	MF	(Ukraine) UKR	Andriy Zaporozhan	10	1	7+1	1	0	0	2	0
	DF	(Ukraine) UKR	Maksym Dubenkov	1	0	0	0	0+1	0	0	0
	DF	(Ukraine) UKR	Oleh Sokolov	1	0	0	0	1	0	0	0
	MF	(Ukraine) UKR	Maksym Kulish	1	0	0	0	1	0	0	0
	MF	(Ukraine) UKR	Bohdan Lytvyak	1	0	0	0	1	0	0	0

Source: Competitions

Last updated: 25 July 2020

=== Goalscorers ===
Rank	No.	Pos	Nat	Name	Premier League	Cup	Europa League	Total
1	10	MF	(Ukraine)	Maksym Tretyakov	10	0	0	10
2	6	MF	(Ukraine)	Kyrylo Kovalets	7	0	0	7
3	44	MF	(Ukraine)	Yevhen Banada	5	0	1	6
4	9	FW	(Ukraine)	Denys Bezborodko	4	0	1	5
4	18	FW	(Ukraine)	Artem Sitalo	4	0	1	5
4	27	MF	(Ukraine)	Dmytro Hrechyshkin	5	0	0	5
7	94	MF	(Ukraine)	Maksym Zaderaka	2	0	1	3
8	4	DF	(Ukraine)	Vladyslav Babohlo	2	0	0	2
8	8	MF	(Ukraine)	Oleksiy Dovhyi	2	0	0	2
8	23	MF	(Ukraine)	Dmytro Shastal	2	0	0	2
8	77	MF	(Ukraine)	Bohdan Myshenko	2	0	0	2
12	11	DF	(Ukraine)	Denys Miroshnichenko	0	0	1	1
12	15	MF	(Ukraine)	Andriy Zaporozhan	1	0	0	1
12	17	MF	(Ukraine)	Valeriy Luchkevych	1	0	0	1
12	22	MF	(Ukraine)	Vasyl Hrytsuk	1	0	0	1
12	26	DF	(Ukraine)	Anton Shendrik	1	0	0	1
12		MF	(Ukraine)	Andriy Hloba	0	1	0	1
				Own goal	1	1	1	3
				Total	50	2	6	68

Last updated: 25 July 2020

=== Clean sheets ===
Rank	No.	Pos	Nat	Name	Premier League	Cup	Europa League	Total
1	79	GK	(Ukraine)	Yuriy Pankiv	8	0	0	8
2	31	GK	(Ukraine)	Oleh Bilyk	2	1	0	3
				Total	10	1	0	11

Last updated: 25 July 2020

=== Disciplinary record ===
No.	Pos	Nat	Player	Premier League			Cup			Europa League			Total		
No.	Pos	Nat	Player	Booked	(yellow card) (yellow-red card)	Sent off (straight red)	Booked	(yellow card) (yellow-red card)	Sent off (straight red)	Booked	(yellow card) (yellow-red card)	Sent off (straight red)	Booked	(yellow card) (yellow-red card)	Sent off (straight red)
4	DF	(Ukraine)	Vladyslav Babohlo	7	1	0	1	0	0	0	0	0	8	1	0
5	DF	(Ukraine)	Tymur Stetskov	5	0	0	0	0	0	0	0	0	5	0	0
6	MF	(Ukraine)	Kyrylo Kovalets	5	0	0	1	0	0	1	0	0	7	0	0
8	MF	(Ukraine)	Oleksiy Dovhyi	5	1	0	1	0	0	0	0	0	6	1	0
9	FW	(Ukraine)	Denys Bezborodko	7	0	0	1	0	0	0	0	0	8	0	0
10	MF	(Ukraine)	Maksym Tretyakov	2	0	0	0	0	0	0	0	0	2	0	0
11	DF	(Ukraine)	Denys Miroshnichenko	6	1	0	1	0	0	1	0	0	8	1	0
13	DF	(Ukraine)	Hlib Bukhal	3	1	0	1	0	0	0	0	0	4	1	0
15	MF	(Ukraine)	Andriy Zaporozhan	2	0	0	0	0	0	0	0	0	2	0	0
17	MF	(Ukraine)	Valeriy Luchkevych	5	0	0	0	0	0	0	0	0	5	0	0
18	FW	(Ukraine)	Artem Sitalo	1	0	0	0	0	0	0	0	0	1	0	0
20	DF	(Azerbaijan)	Pavel Pashayev	7	0	0	0	0	0	0	0	0	7	0	0
23	MF	(Ukraine)	Dmytro Shastal	3	1	0	0	0	0	1	0	0	4	1	0
26	DF	(Ukraine)	Anton Shendrik	3	0	0	1	0	0	0	0	0	4	0	0
27	MF	(Ukraine)	Dmytro Hrechyshkin	3	1	0	1	0	0	0	0	0	4	1	0
31	GK	(Ukraine)	Oleh Bilyk	1	0	0	0	0	0	0	0	0	1	0	0
44	MF	(Ukraine)	Yevhen Banada	9	0	0	0	0	0	1	0	0	10	0	0
47	DF	(Ukraine)	Roman Vantukh	1	0	0	0	0	0	0	0	0	1	0	0
55	DF	(Ukraine)	Anton Shendrik	0	0	0	1	0	0	0	0	0	1	0	0
77	MF	(Ukraine)	Bohdan Myshenko	1	0	0	0	0	0	0	0	0	1	0	0
79	GK	(Ukraine)	Yuriy Pankiv	1	0	1	0	0	0	1	0	0	2	0	1
90	DF	(Latvia)	Kaspars Dubra	1	1	0	0	0	0	1	0	0	2	1	0
94	MF	(Ukraine)	Maksym Zaderaka	2	0	0	0	0	0	0	0	0	2	0	0
	DF	(Ukraine)	Maksym Dubenkov	0	0	0	1	0	0	0	0	0	1	0	0
	MF	(Ukraine)	Maksym Ivakhno	0	0	0	1	0	0	0	0	0	1	0	0
	FW	(Ukraine)	Andriy Novikov	0	0	0	1	0	0	0	0	0	1	0	0
			Total	85	6	1	7	0	0	6	0	0	98	6	1

Last updated: 19 July 2020

=== Attendances ===
	Matches	Attendances	Average	High	Low
Premier League	17	19,846	1,167	4,004	0
Cup	1	1,061	1,061	1,061	1,061
Europa League	2	13,949	6,974	7,588	6,361
Total	20	34,856	3,067	7,588	0

Last updated: 25 July 2020
