= Bila =

Bila or Bílá may refer to:

== Places ==
- Bila, Ethiopia, formerly known as Billo and Billa, or its eponymous Bila Seyo region
- Bila, Livno, a village in Bosnia and Herzegovina
- Bila, Vitez, a village in Bosnia and Herzegovina
- Bila, a village in Schitu Commune, Romania
- Bila River (disambiguation)
- Bílá (Frýdek-Místek District), a municipality and village in the Czech Republic
- Bílá (Liberec District), a municipality and village in the Czech Republic
- Bílá, a village and part of Číměř (Jindřichův Hradec District) in the Czech Republic

== Surname ==
- Bílá, the feminine form of the Czech surname Bílý
- Bila, the feminine form of the Ukrainian surname Bilyi
- Jedediah Bila, American TV host, author and columnist
- Abdoul Bila, Burkinabé footballer
- Vonani Bila, South African author and poet

== Other ==
- Bila (sun), the solar deity of the Adnyamathanha people
- Bila language, a Bantu language spoken by the Mbuti Pygmies
- Bila' language, the name for several extinct Mon–Khmer languages of Malaya
- Battalions of Light Infantry of Africa (BILA)
