= Číměř =

Číměř may refer to places in the Czech Republic:

- Číměř (Jindřichův Hradec District), a municipality and village in the South Bohemian Region
- Číměř (Třebíč District), a municipality and village in the Vysočina Region
