= Bilyk =

Bilyk (Ukrainian: Білик) is a Ukrainian surname derived from a word meaning "white" (білий). It may refer to:

- Alfred Bilyk (1889–1939), Polish lawyer, military officer, and politician
- Catryna Bilyk (born 1959), Australian politician
- Jeff Bilyk (born 1977), American association football player
- Iryna Bilyk (born 1970), Ukrainian singer
- Iryney Bilyk (born 1950), Ukrainian Greek-Catholic hierarch
- Luke Bilyk (born 1994), Canadian actor
- Nikola Bilyk (born 1996), Austrian handball player
- Oleh Bilyk (born 1998), Ukrainian football player
- Vera Belik (Ukrainian Bilyk)

== See also ==
- Bilyi
- Biłyk
