= Bílý =

Bílý (feminine: Bílá) is a Czech surname, meaning 'white'. Notable people with the surname include:

- Josef Bílý (1872–1941), Czech general
- Laurence Bily (born 1963), French sprinter
- Lucie Bílá, real name Hana Zaňáková (born 1966), Czech singer
- Sydir Bily (1716–1788), Ukrainian Cossack
- Věra Bílá (1954–2019), Czech singer

== See also ==
- Bila (disambiguation)
- Billy (disambiguation)
- Bilyi, Ukrainian surname
