= Bilyi =

Bilyi or Bilyy (Ukrainian: Білий) is a Ukrainian surname derived from a word meaning "white" (білий). Feminine form: Bila (Біла). Russian equivalent: Bely. It may refer to:

- Ivan Bilyi (born 1988), Ukrainian footballer
- Maksym Bilyi (disambiguation), multiple people
- Mykhailo Bilyi (1922–2001), Ukrainian Soviet politician
- Oleh Bilyi (born 1993), Ukrainian footballer
- Oleksii Bilyi (born 1961), Ukrainian politician
- Vasyl Bilyi (born 1990), Ukrainian footballer
- Vladyslav Bilyi (born 1997), Ukrainian Paralympic athlete

== See also ==
- Bilyk
- Bila (disambiguation)
