= 2019–20 Ukrainian Premier League =

29th season of top-tier football league in Vyshcha Liha

FavBet Liha (UPL)
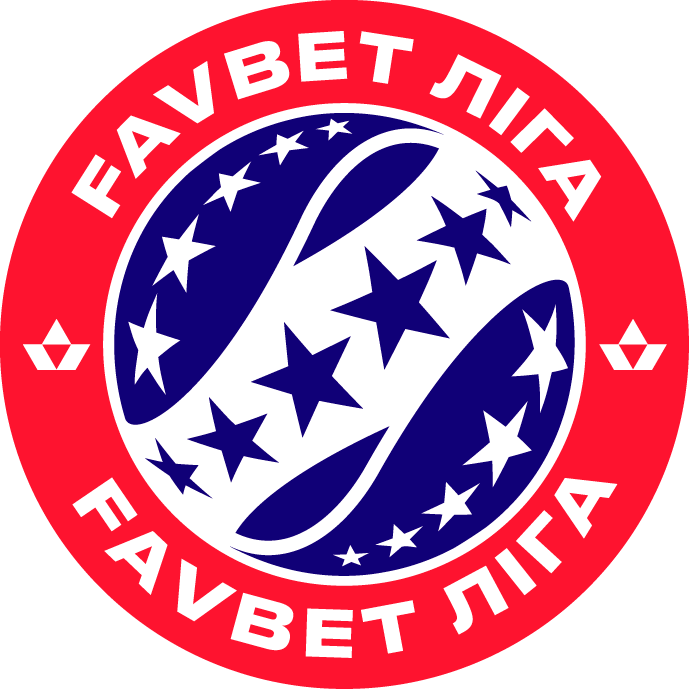
- Official logo
- Season: 2019–20
- Dates: 28 July 2019 – 19 July 2020 (winter break 15 December 2019 – 22 February 2020) (emergency 18 March 2020 – 30 May 2020)
- Champions: Shakhtar Donetsk; 13th Ukrainian title
- Relegated: Karpaty Lviv
- Champions League: Shakhtar Donetsk; Dynamo Kyiv
- Europa League: Zorya Luhansk; Desna Chernihiv; Kolos Kovalivka
- Matches: 184
- Goals: 511 (2.78 per match)
- Top goalscorer: 20 – Júnior Moraes (Shakhtar)
- Biggest home win: 6 – Shakhtar 6–0 Kolos (Round 11)
- Biggest away win: 5 – Vorskla 0–5 Dynamo (Round 8), Olimpik 0–5 Zorya (Round 9)
- Highest scoring: 8 – Karpaty 2–6 Desna (Round 17)
- Longest winning run: 11 – Shakhtar (Round 1–11)
- Longest unbeaten run: 19 – Shakhtar (Round 1–19)
- Longest winless run: 17 – Karpaty (Round 8–23, 28)
- Longest losing run: 7 – Olimpik (Round 16–22); Kolos (Round 21–27)
- Highest attendance: 41,203 – Dynamo 1–2 Shakhtar (Round 3)
- Lowest attendance: 0 – Dynamo 2–1 Vorskla (Round 19)
- Total attendance: 552941
- Average attendance: 4221
- All statistics correct as of 19 July 2020.

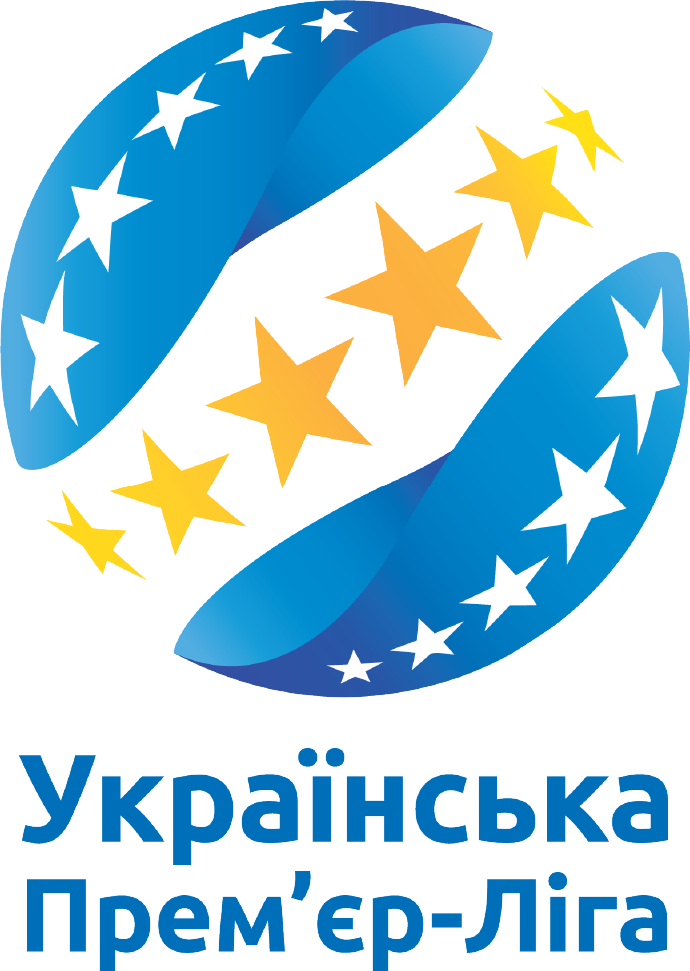
Official logo of Premier Liha in August 2019 was changed

The 2019–20 Ukrainian Premier League season was the 29th top-level football club competitions since the fall of the Soviet Union and the 12th since the establishment of the Ukrainian Premier League.

The tournament has been set to start on 28 July 2019. The same day there took place the game for the Ukrainian Super Cup. The UPL General Assembly also adopted a post season play-off mini-tournament for the last fifth berth of Ukraine in the 2020–21 UEFA Europa League competition which would involve the best team(s) of the relegation group. The assembly also agreed to implement the Video assistant referee (VAR) position in 2020. With the ongoing competition, on 7 August 2019 the league adopted new name FavBet Liha after its main sponsor as well as its new logo. For promotional purpose, the Ukrainian Premier League introduced an own copy of virtual fantasy league on the Real Manager game platform.

The defending champion was the 12-times winner Shakhtar Donetsk. On 20 June 2020, Shakhtar won the league again by beating Oleksandriya in the Round 27 home game gaining its 13th title record five rounds before the finish.

Competition prolongation caused by the emergency break introduced due to the COVID-19 pandemic made the season the longest in history, lasting 1 year and 1 day in total. The season also has set a record as a highest-scoring season in the history of the competition, with an average of 2.78 goals scored per game.

== Summary ==
For next 2020–21 season, Ukrainian Premier League will expand to 14 teams. The lowest ranked team from Ukrainian Premier League will get relegated to Ukrainian First League. However, the top three teams from Ukrainian First League will gain promotion to Ukrainian Premier League next season.

Due to the COVID-19 pandemic in Ukraine and based on resolutions of the Cabinet of Ukraine and the UAF Executive Committee, on 11 March 2020 the UPL adopted a decision to conduct games of the league's championship as well as under-21 and under-19 championships without spectators until 3 April 2020 (the first two rounds of the season's second stage).

On 17 March 2020, the Ukrainian Association of Football adopted its decision to pause all football competitions in the country since 18 March 2020 for unspecified period of time (until adaptation of its next decision to resume all football events) due to the coronavirus pandemic. On 14 May 2020 in the House of Football took place a working conference between leaders of UAF and UPL with representatives of the UPL club where it was decided not to renew competitions among U-21 and U-19 teams. The decision was approved on 27 May 2020 by the UAF Executive Committee. On 26 May 2020 the Ministry of Healthcare granted its permission to conduct games of the Favbet Liha and the Ukrainian Cup without spectators starting 30 May 2020 and the UAF Executive Committee supported the decision to renew the Championship and the Ukrainian Cup from 30 May 2020. Next day the Ministry of Health Care updated some of its restricting recommendations in regards to coordination of competitions among professional clubs.

On 22 July 2020 Ministry of Healthcare granted the permission to allow spectators on the Europa League play-off matches in a test mode, with up to 25% of stadium capacity open for attending.

The term of the UPL president expired on 5 April 2020. Due to pandemic situation worldwide, the election of the League's president was postponed to 27 April 2020. The current president Thomas Grimm stated that he will not run for the post as the members of the league are not interested to work together. On 4 May 2020 the league's executive director Yevhen Dykyi announced that there were registered three candidates for elections of the UPL president. On 18 May 2020 the league announced that elections for the league's president were postponed and their date will be announced later. Until then as the UPL president is acting the league's executive director Yevhen Dykyi.

== Teams ==
=== Promoted teams ===
- SC Dnipro-1 – the champion of the 2018–19 Ukrainian First League (debut)
- Kolos Kovalivka – 2nd place of the 2018–19 Ukrainian First League, play-off winners (debut)

=== Other issues ===
- Olimpik Donetsk's participation in the season was under question because both of its youth teams (U-21 and U-19) were expelled from the Ukrainian Premier League due to match fixing, and are banned from competitions until the end of 2019–20 season.

=== Location map ===
The following displays the location of teams.

Home venues of teams in the 2019–20 Ukrainian Premier League.
Teams in italics are from the conflict zone of the War in Donbas and are playing their home games in different cities.
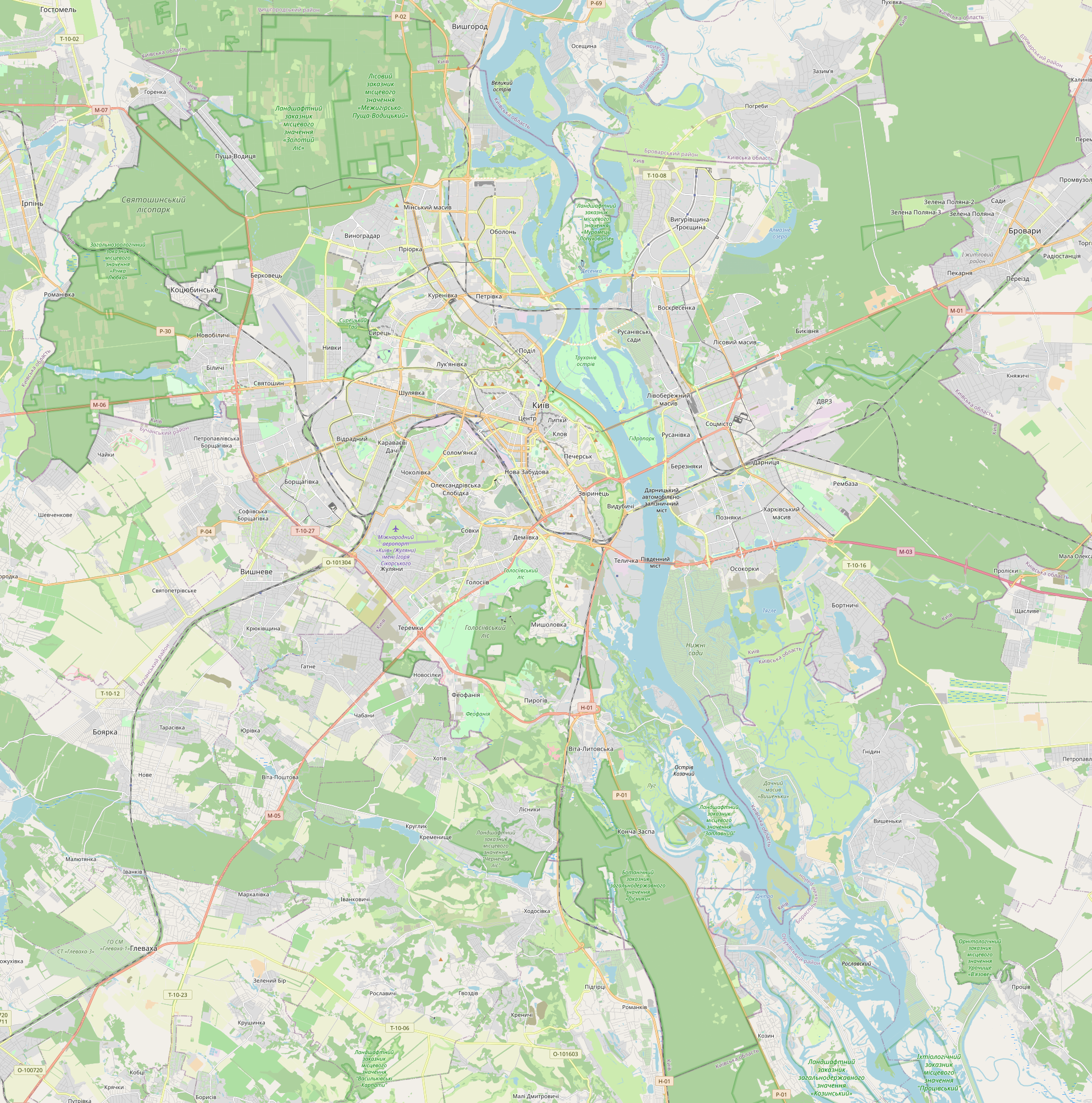
Kyiv city home venues of teams in the League. In italics identified clubs that are not from Kyiv.
Lviv city home venues of teams in the League

=== Stadiums ===
Three teams play their matches outside of home towns. The minimum threshold for the stadium's capacity in the UPL is 5,000 (Article 10, paragraph 7.2).

Due to COVID-19 restrictions, after quarantine break clubs from Lviv were forced to conduct all their home matches in the other regions until the Round 30.

The following stadiums are regarded as home grounds (clubs in bold indicate that the respective stadium was their main home ground during the season):

Rank	Stadium	Place	Club	Capacity	Notes
1	NSC Olimpiyskiy	Kyiv	**Dynamo Kyiv**	70,050	
1	NSC Olimpiyskiy	Kyiv	**Shakhtar Donetsk**	70,050	used as home ground following COVID-19 quarantine
1	NSC Olimpiyskiy	Kyiv	Kolos Kovalivka	70,050	used as home ground in Rounds 26, 32 and playoff
2	OSC Metalist	Kharkiv	**Shakhtar Donetsk**	40,003	used as home ground before COVID-19 pandemic
3	Arena Lviv	Lviv	FC Lviv	34,915	used as home ground in Rounds 2 and 4
4	Dnipro-Arena	Dnipro	**SC Dnipro-1**	31,003	
4	Dnipro-Arena	Dnipro	FC Lviv	31,003	used as home ground in Round 25
5	Ukraina Stadium	Lviv	**Karpaty Lviv**	28,051	
5	Ukraina Stadium	Lviv	**FC Lviv**	28,051	
6	Vorskla Stadium	Poltava	**Vorskla Poltava**	24,795	
7	Lobanovsky Dynamo Stadium	Kyiv	**Olimpik Donetsk**	16,873	used as home ground during the season
7	Lobanovsky Dynamo Stadium	Kyiv	Dynamo Kyiv	16,873	used as home ground in Round 19
8	Ternopilsky Misky Stadion	Ternopil	FC Lviv	15,150	used as home ground in Round 29
8	Ternopilsky Misky Stadion	Ternopil	SC Dnipro-1	15,150	used as home ground in Round 30
9	Volodymyr Boiko Stadium	Mariupol	**FC Mariupol**	12,680	
10	Avanhard Stadium	Lutsk	Karpaty Lviv	12,080	used as home ground in Round 28
11	Chernihiv Stadium	Chernihiv	**Desna Chernihiv**	12,060	
12	Slavutych-Arena	Zaporizhzhia	**Zorya Luhansk**	12,000	used as home ground during the season
13	CSC Nika Stadium	Oleksandriya	**FC Oleksandriya**	7,000	
14	Obolon Arena	Kyiv	**Kolos Kovalivka**	5,100	used as home ground during the season

Notes:

- The Round 19 game between Dynamo and Vorskla was played on February 22, 2020, at the Dynamo Stadium imeni Lobanovskoho becoming a historical mark when there first was implemented the system of video assistant referee (VAR).
- Due to critical situation in the city of Lviv with the ongoing COVID-19 pandemic, the Lviv city club's do not play at home from Round 24 till Round 30.

=== Personnel and sponsorship ===
Team	President	Head coach	Captain	Kit manufacturer	Shirt sponsor
Desna Chernihiv	Volodymyr Levin	(Ukraine) Oleksandr Ryabokon	(Ukraine) Denys Favorov	Nike	Parimatch
SC Dnipro-1	Yuriy Bereza	(Ukraine) Dmytro Mykhaylenko	(Ukraine) Serhiy Kravchenko	Nike	—
Dynamo Kyiv	Ihor Surkis	(Ukraine) Oleksiy Mykhaylychenko	(Ukraine) Serhiy Sydorchuk	New Balance	—
Karpaty Lviv	Oleh Smaliychuk (Note: Oleh Smaliychuk bought out control package of ownership in stock in the club from Petro Dyminskyi.)	(Ukraine) Roman Sanzhar	(Ukraine) Dmytro Klyots	Joma	Marathonbet
Kolos Kovalivka	Andriy Zasukha	(Ukraine) Ruslan Kostyshyn	(Ukraine) Vitaliy Havrysh	Nike	Svitanok
FC Lviv	Bohdan Kopytko	(Georgia (country)) Giorgi Tsetsadze	(Ukraine) Serhiy Borzenko	Nike	LIMO
FC Mariupol	Tariq Mehmood Chaudhry	(Ukraine) Oleksandr Babych	(Ukraine) Serhiy Yavorskyi	Nike	Favorite Sport
FC Oleksandriya	Serhiy Kuzmenko	(Ukraine) Volodymyr Sharan	(Ukraine) Yuriy Pankiv	Nike	AgroVista
Olimpik Donetsk	Vladyslav Helzin	(Ukraine) Ihor Klymovskyi (interim)	(Ukraine) Dmytro Hryshko	Joma	Parimatch
Shakhtar Donetsk	Rinat Akhmetov	(Portugal) Luís Castro	(Ukraine) Andriy Pyatov	Nike	Parimatch
Vorskla Poltava	Kostyantyn Zhevago	(Ukraine) Yuriy Maksymov	(Ukraine) Volodymyr Chesnakov	Nike	Ferrexpo
Zorya Luhansk	Yevhen Heller	(Ukraine) Viktor Skrypnyk	(Ukraine) Mykyta Kamenyuka	Nike	Favorite Sport

=== Managerial changes ===
Team	Outgoing manager	Manner of departure	Date of vacancy	Table	Incoming manager	Date of appointment
Zorya Luhansk	(Ukraine) Yuriy Vernydub	Mutual consent	31 May 2019	Pre-season	(Ukraine) Viktor Skrypnyk	3 June 2019
Vorskla Poltava	(Ukraine) Vitaliy Kosovskyi (caretaker)	Change of contract	4 June 2019	Pre-season	(Ukraine) Vitaliy Kosovskyi	4 June 2019
Shakhtar Donetsk	(Portugal) Paulo Fonseca	Signed with A.S. Roma	11 June 2019	Pre-season	(Portugal) Luís Castro	12 June 2019
Karpaty Lviv	(Ukraine) Oleksandr Chyzhevskyi (caretaker)	Change of contract	18 June 2019	Pre-season	(Ukraine) Oleksandr Chyzhevskyi	18 June 2019
Olimpik Donetsk	(Ukraine) Ihor Klymovskyi (interim)	End of interim term	1 July 2019	Pre-season	(Brazil) Júlio César Correia	1 July 2019
Dynamo Kyiv	(Belarus) Alyaksandr Khatskevich	Sacked	14 August 2019	3rd	(Ukraine) Oleksiy Mykhaylychenko	15 August 2019
Olimpik Donetsk	(Brazil) Júlio César Correia	Sacked	19 August 2019	12th	(Ukraine) Ihor Klymovskyi (interim)	19 August 2019
Olimpik Donetsk	(Ukraine) Ihor Klymovskyi (interim)	End of interim	2 September 2019	12th	(Spain) Vicente Gómez	2 September 2019
Karpaty Lviv	(Ukraine) Oleksandr Chyzhevskyi	Sacked	3 September 2019	11th	(Ukraine) Roman Sanzhar	3 September 2019
FC Lviv	(Ukraine) Bohdan Blavatskyi	Mutual consent	10 September 2019	10th	(Ukraine) Volodymyr Mazyar	10 September 2019
FC Lviv	(Ukraine) Volodymyr Mazyar	Mutual consent	31 October 2019	12th	(Armenia) Yegishe Melikyan	31 October 2019
Vorskla Poltava	(Ukraine) Vitaliy Kosovskyi	Change of contract	14 November 2019	12th	(Ukraine) Yuriy Maksymov	15 November 2019
Olimpik Donetsk	(Spain) Vicente Gómez	Mutual consent	13 March 2020	11th	(Ukraine) Ihor Klymovskyi (interim)	13 March 2020
FC Lviv	(Armenia) Yegishe Melikyan	End of contract	21 June 2020	9th	(Georgia (country)) Giorgi Tsetsadze	22 June 2020

== First stage ==
=== First stage table ===
Pos	Team	Pld	W	D	L	GF	GA	GD	Pts	Qualification or relegation (Note: Teams play each other twice (22 matches), before the league split into two groups (the top six and the bottom six) for the last 10 matches.)
1	Shakhtar Donetsk	22	19	2	1	59	14	+45	59	Qualification for the Championship round
2	Dynamo Kyiv	22	14	3	5	44	17	+27	45	Qualification for the Championship round
3	Zorya Luhansk	22	13	4	5	39	18	+21	43	Qualification for the Championship round
4	Desna Chernihiv	22	13	3	6	36	15	+21	42	Qualification for the Championship round
5	FC Oleksandriya	22	11	4	7	30	23	+7	37	Qualification for the Championship round
6	Kolos Kovalivka	22	8	2	12	25	39	−14	26	Qualification for the Championship round
7	SC Dnipro-1	22	7	4	11	26	34	−8	25 (Note: Dnipro-1 is ahead of Mariupol on head-to-head goal difference: Dnipro-1 3, Mariupol 1)	Qualification for the Relegation round
8	FC Mariupol	22	6	7	9	21	35	−14	25	Qualification for the Relegation round
9	FC Lviv	22	5	5	12	16	35	−19	20 (Note: Lviv is ahead of Vorskla on head-to-head goal difference: Lviv 4, Vorskla 3)	Qualification for the Relegation round
10	Vorskla Poltava	22	6	2	14	15	38	−23	20	Qualification for the Relegation round
11	Olimpik Donetsk	22	5	3	14	17	37	−20	18	Qualification for the Relegation round
12	Karpaty Lviv	22	2	7	13	17	40	−23	13	Qualification for the Relegation round

Source: Ukrainian Premier League, Soccerway
Rules for classification: 1) Points; 2) Head-to-head points; 3) Head-to-head goal difference; 4) Head-to-head higher number of goals scored; 5) Goal difference; 6) Higher number of goals scored; 7) Draw or "golden match" if tied for title (Article 22, paragraph 3).

=== First stage results ===
Teams play each other twice on a home and away basis, before the league split into two groups – the top six and the bottom six.

Home \ Away	DES	DNI	DYN	KAR	KOL	LVI	MAR	OLK	OLD	SHA	VOR	ZOR
Desna Chernihiv		1–1	0–1	0–0	0–0	1–2	4–0	2–0	1–0	0–1	2–0	1–0
SC Dnipro-1	0–1		3–1	2–0	2–1	2–3	3–0	1–2	2–0	0–2	1–0	1–4
Dynamo Kyiv	1–2	2–0		1–1	2–0	4–0	3–0	1–0	1–1	1–2	2–1	1–2
Karpaty Lviv	2–6	1–1	0–2		1–2	0–0	1–1	0–4	1–2	0–3	2–1	0–1
Kolos Kovalivka	2–0	4–0	0–4	2–1		1–0	2–1	1–1	1–2	3–4	0–3	1–3
FC Lviv	1–4	0–2	0–3	0–0	3–2		0–1	1–1	0–1	0–2	2–0	0–0
FC Mariupol	0–4	1–0	0–1	2–2	2–0	0–0		2–1	1–1	1–1	3–0	1–2
FC Oleksandriya	0–3	2–0	1–3	2–1	1–2	2–0	3–1		2–1	1–3	3–0	1–0
Olimpik Donetsk	1–2	3–2	1–3	1–3	0–1	0–1	1–2	0–0		0–4	2–0	0–5
Shakhtar Donetsk	1–0	4–1	1–0	3–0	6–0	4–1	5–1	0–0	3–0		4–0	4–3
Vorskla Poltava	0–1	1–1	0–5	2–1	1–0	3–2	1–1	0–1	1–0	1–0		0–1
Zorya Luhansk	2–1	1–1	2–2	2–0	2–0	2–0	0–0	1–2	1–0	1–2	4–0	

Source: UPL calendar, uafootball.net.ua
Legend: Blue = home team win; Yellow = draw; Red = away team win.

=== First stage positions by round ===
The following table represents the teams position after each round in the competition played chronologically.

Team ╲ Round	1	2	3	4	5	6	7	8	9	10	11	12	13	14	15	16	17	18	19	20	21	22
Shakhtar Donetsk	1	1	1	1	1	1	1	1	1	1	1	1	1	1	1	1	1	1	1	1	1	1
Dynamo Kyiv	2	2	3	5	5	5	6	3	3	3	2	2	2	4	2	2	4	2	2	3	3	2
Zorya Luhansk	6	5	2	2	3	3	4	5	5	5	5	4	4	2	3	3	2	3	3	2	2	3
Desna Chernihiv	7	8	4	3	2	2	2	2	2	2	3	3	3	3	4	4	3	4	4	4	4	4
FC Oleksandriya	10	9	8	6	8	4	3	4	4	4	4	5	5	5	5	5	5	5	5	5	5	5
Kolos Kovalivka	4	3	5	4	6	8	5	7	6	6	6	7	8	8	8	9	6	7	6	6	6	6
SC Dnipro-1	3	4	6	7	9	6	9	6	7	7	8	8	9	9	9	7	8	8	8	8	8	7
FC Mariupol	8	7	7	8	10	9	7	8	8	8	7	6	6	6	7	6	7	6	7	7	7	8
FC Lviv	5	6	10	11	7	10	11	11	11	11	12	12	12	11	11	11	10	10	10	9	9	9
Vorskla Poltava	9	10	9	9	4	7	10	10	10	10	11	11	11	12	12	12	12	11	11	11	11	10
Olimpik Donetsk	12	11	12	12	12	12	12	12	12	12	10	9	7	7	6	8	9	9	9	10	10	11
Karpaty Lviv	11	12	11	10	11	11	8	9	9	9	9	10	10	10	10	10	11	12	12	12	12	12

== Championship round ==
=== Championship round table ===
Pos	Team	Pld	W	D	L	GF	GA	GD	Pts	Qualification or relegation
1	Shakhtar Donetsk (C)	32	26	4	2	80	26	+54	82	Qualification for the Champions League group stage
2	Dynamo Kyiv	32	18	5	9	65	35	+30	59	Qualification for the Champions League third qualifying round
3	Zorya Luhansk	32	17	7	8	50	29	+21	58	Qualification for the Europa League group stage
4	Desna Chernihiv	32	17	5	10	59	33	+26	56	Qualification for the Europa League third qualifying round
5	FC Oleksandriya	32	14	7	11	49	47	+2	49	Qualification for the playoff for Europa League second qualifying round
6	Kolos Kovalivka (O)	32	10	2	20	33	59	−26	32	Qualification for the playoff for Europa League second qualifying round

Source: Ukrainian Premier League, UEFA, Soccerway
Rules for classification: 1) Points; 2) Head-to-head points; 3) Head-to-head goal difference; 4) Head-to-head higher number of goals scored; 5) Goal difference; 6) Higher number of goals scored; 7) Draw or "golden match" if tied for title (Article 22, paragraph 3).
(C) Champions; (O) Play-off winners

=== Championship round results ===
Home \ Away	DES	DYN	KOL	OLK	SHA	ZOR
Desna Chernihiv	—	3–2	5–1	1–3	2–4	1–2
Dynamo Kyiv	1–1	—	2–1	5–1	2–3	3–1
Kolos Kovalivka	0–2	2–0	—	2–1	0–1	0–2
FC Oleksandriya	1–5	2–2	4–2	—	2–2	1–0
Shakhtar Donetsk	3–2	3–1	2–0	3–2	—	0–0
Zorya Luhansk	1–1	1–3	1–0	2–2	1–0	—

Source: UPL calendar (in Ukrainian)
Legend: Blue = home team win; Yellow = draw; Red = away team win.
For upcoming matches, an "a" indicates there is an article about the rivalry between the two participants.

=== Championship round positions by round ===
Team ╲ Round	23	24	25	26	27	28	29	30	31	32
Shakhtar Donetsk	1	1	1	1	1	1	1	1	1	1
Dynamo Kyiv	3	4	3	2	2	2	3	3	2	2
Zorya Luhansk	2	2	2	4	3	3	4	2	3	3
Desna Chernihiv	4	3	4	3	4	4	2	4	4	4
FC Oleksandriya	5	5	5	5	5	5	5	5	5	5
Kolos Kovalivka	6	6	6	6	6	6	6	6	6	6

== Relegation round ==
=== Relegation round table ===
Pos	Team	Pld	W	D	L	GF	GA	GD	Pts	Qualification or relegation
7	SC Dnipro-1	32	15	4	13	42	42	0	49	Qualification for the playoff for Europa League second qualifying round
8	FC Mariupol	32	12	9	11	40	46	−6	45	Qualification for the playoff for Europa League second qualifying round
9	Olimpik Donetsk	32	10	6	16	32	47	−15	36	
10	Vorskla Poltava	32	9	7	16	23	48	−25	34	
11	FC Lviv	32	5	9	18	25	57	−32	24	
12	Karpaty Lviv (Note: Karpaty Lviv was expelled from the league for failing to appear to two games.)	32	2	9	21	19	48	−29	15	Expelled from the league

Source: Ukrainian Premier League, UEFA, Soccerway
Rules for classification: 1) Points; 2) Head-to-head points; 3) Head-to-head goal difference; 4) Head-to-head higher number of goals scored; 5) Goal difference; 6) Higher number of goals scored; 7) Draw or "golden match" if tied for title (Article 22, paragraph 3).

=== Relegation round results ===
Home \ Away	DN1	KAR	LVI	MAR	OLD	VOR
SC Dnipro-1	—	+/- (Note: The UPL administration decided not to conduct the game Karpaty – Mariupol on 31 May 2020 as in the Lviv's team camp were found positive test results on COVID-19. FC Mariupol that was already on the way to the game was forced to turn around. On 2 June 2020 FC Karpaty Lviv released its official statement announcing that the club goes on 2 weeks self-isolation due to mass spread of the illness among players. The upcoming games with SC Dnipro-1 and Vorskla Poltava will not take place as previously scheduled. On 26 June 2020 were announced new rescheduled dates for the Karpaty's games against Mariupol and Dnipro-1. On 30 June 2020 the Ukrainian Premier League filed a document to the UAF Control and Disciplinary Committee informing that FC Karpaty Lviv were not able to show up for the game in Mariupol on 1 July 2020. The Mariupol–Karpaty game scheduled on 4 July will not take place. As it was the second failure to appear to the match for FC Karpaty Lviv, according to regulations the club was expelled from the championship by the UAF Control-Disciplinary Committee on 9 July 2020. The club was counted two technical defeats for two matches against FC Mariupol as 3:0 and 0:3. For all other remaining games that were due to play the club was counted -:+.)	3–2	2–0	3–1	3–0
Karpaty Lviv	-/+	—	1–1	0–3	-/+	-/+
FC Lviv	1–2	1–1	—	0–2	1–5	2–2
FC Mariupol	2–1	3–0	3–0	—	1–4	1–1
Olimpik Donetsk	0–2	+/-	2–0	2–2	—	1–1
Vorskla Poltava	2–0	+/-	1–1	1–2	0–0	—

Source: UPL calendar (in Ukrainian)
Legend: Blue = home team win; Yellow = draw; Red = away team win.
For upcoming matches, an "a" indicates there is an article about the rivalry between the two participants.

=== Relegation round positions by round ===
Team ╲ Round	23	24	25	26	27	28	29	30	31	32
SC Dnipro-1	7	7	7	7	7	7	7	7	7	7
FC Mariupol	8	8	8	8	8	8	8	8	8	8
Olimpik Donetsk	11	11	11	9	10	10	10	10	9	9
Vorskla Poltava	10	10	10	10	9	9	9	9	10	10
FC Lviv	9	9	9	11	11	11	11	11	11	11
Karpaty Lviv	12	12	12	12	12	12	12	12	12	12

== Play-offs for qualification to the UEFA Europa League ==
Teams that placed 5th and 6th in the Championship group with the teams placed 7th and 8th in the Relegation group played the one-leg play-off for one more berth in the Europa League second qualifying round. Winners of the semi-final pairs contested in one-leg final game the last berth to the UEFA Europa League. If the winners of the 2019–20 Ukrainian Cup Dynamo Kyiv hadn't already clinched the berth to the European competitions by the league performance, the play-off would have been set among teams placed 4th, 5th and 6th in the Championship group and 7th in the Relegation group in the same way.

Kolos Kovalivka won the play-off on 29 July 2020 after defeating FC Mariupol 1–0 after the extra time in the final.

Semi-finals; 25 July 2020
6th	Kolos Kovalivka	4
7th	SC Dnipro-1	1
5th	FC Oleksandriya	1
8th	FC Mariupol	2

Final; 29 July 2020
6th	Kolos Kovalivka (a.e.t.)	1
8th	FC Mariupol	0

=== Semi-finals ===
Team 1	Score	Team 2
Kolos Kovalivka	4–1	SC Dnipro-1
FC Oleksandriya	1–2	FC Mariupol

25 July 2020
17:00 UTC+3

Kolos Kovalivka	4–1	SC Dnipro-1
Orikhovskyi 22'; Antyukh 24', 50'; Morozko 87'	Report	Supriaha 48'

Olimpiyskiy NSC, Kyiv
Attendance: 2,915 (Note: Played with attendance restrictions due to the COVID-19 pandemic in Ukraine.)
Referee: Kateryna Monzul, Kharkiv

25 July 2020
19:30 UTC+3

FC Oleksandriya	1–2	FC Mariupol
Bezborodko 35'	Report	Polehenko 28'; Kashchuk 83'

CSC Nika, Oleksandriya
Attendance: 1,070
Referee: Anatoliy Abdula, Kharkiv

=== Final ===
Team 1	Score	Team 2
Kolos Kovalivka	1–0 (a.e.t.)	FC Mariupol

29 July 2020
19:30 UTC+3

Kolos Kovalivka	1–0 (a.e.t.)	FC Mariupol
Antyukh 95'	Report

Olimpiyskiy NSC, Kyiv
Attendance: 5,073
Referee: Yevhen Aranovskyi, Kyiv

== Season statistics ==
=== Top goalscorers ===
As of 19 July 2020

Rank	Scorer	Team	Goals (Pen.)
1	(Ukraine) Júnior Moraes	Shakhtar Donetsk	20 (1)
2	(Ukraine) Oleksandr Filippov	Desna Chernihiv	16 (3)
3	(Ukraine) Vladyslav Supriaha	SC Dnipro-1	14 (2)
3	(Ukraine) Viktor Tsyhankov	Dynamo Kyiv	14 (4)
5	(Ukraine) Marlos	Shakhtar Donetsk	13 (1)
6	(Ukraine) Bohdan Lyednyev	Zorya Luhansk	11 (1)
6	(Slovenia) Benjamin Verbič	Dynamo Kyiv	11 (2)
8	(Brazil) Taison	Shakhtar Donetsk	10 (4)
8	(Ukraine) Maksym Tretyakov	Oleksandriya	10 (7)
10	(Ukraine) Vitaliy Buyalskyi	Dynamo Kyiv	9 (1)
10	(Uruguay) Carlos de Pena	Dynamo Kyiv	9 (1)

=== Top assistants ===
As of 21 July 2020

Rank	Scorer	Team	Assists
1	(Brazil) Taison	Shakhtar Donetsk	10
2	(Ukraine) Yehor Kartushov	Desna Chernihiv	8
2	(Ukraine) Vladyslav Kocherhin	Zorya Luhansk	8
2	(Ukraine) Júnior Moraes	Shakhtar Donetsk	8
5	(Ukraine) Dmytro Myshnyov	FC Mariupol	6
5	(Ukraine) Volodymyr Shepelyev	Dynamo Kyiv	6

=== Clean sheets ===
As of 16 July 2020

Rank	Player	Club	Clean sheets
1	(Ukraine) Yevhen Past	Desna Chernihiv	11
1	(Ukraine) Andriy Pyatov	Shakhtar Donetsk	11
3	(Ukraine) Mykyta Shevchenko	Zorya Luhansk	8
3	(Ukraine) Heorhiy Bushchan	Dynamo Kyiv	8
3	(Ukraine) Yuriy Pankiv	FC Oleksandriya	8

=== Hat-tricks ===
Player	For	Against	Result	Date
(Ukraine) Júnior Moraes	Shakhtar Donetsk	FC Lviv	4–1	22 November 2019
(Ukraine) Vladyslav Supriaha	SC Dnipro-1	Dynamo Kyiv	3–1	28 February 2020
(Iran) Shahab Zahedi	Olimpik Donetsk	FC Lviv	5–1	16 July 2020

Away win
Home win
Draw

== Attendance ==
The ranking is sorted by average attendance, while "Pos" column indicates position of each team in tournament standings.

Pos	Team	Total	High	Low	Average	Change
2	Dynamo Kyiv	141,468	41,203	5,085	14,147	−6.8%^{4}
1	Shakhtar Donetsk	73,503	21,907	2,372	6,682	−10.5%^{1}
7	Dnipro-1	51,556	9,982	1,937	4,687	+58.4%^{3}
10	Vorskla Poltava	43,194	11,399	1,117	3,927	+70.4%
4	Desna Chernihiv	43,125	5,500	2,081	3,920	+20.0%
8	Mariupol	43,035	8,425	689	3,912	+23.3%
12	Karpaty Lviv	38,979	12,135	754	3,544	−11.7%
6	Kolos Kovalivka	30,830	4,892	1,276	2,803	+128.8%^{2,3}
3	Zorya Luhansk	30,449	6,352	1,515	2,768	−26.5%^{1}
11	Lviv	24,904	7,103	540	2,264	−15.3%
5	Oleksandriya	18,780	4,004	911	1,707	−20.7%
9	Olimpik Donetsk	13,118	4,500	254	1,193	+23.9%^{1}
	League total	552,941	41,203	254	4,221	+0.9%

Source: UA-Football, Footboom
Notes:
1: Team plays its matches outside of home city.
2: Team plays its matches outside of home city due to stadium reconstruction.
3: Team played last season in the First League.
4: Dynamo Kyiv played 1 additional match behind closed doors.
5: All matches starting from the round 23 to the end of second stage were played behind closed doors due to the COVID-19 pandemic.
6: The figures do not take into account three games of the Europa League play-offs, which were held with attendance restrictions due to health measures related to the COVID-19 pandemic.

== Awards ==
=== Monthly awards ===
Month	Player of the Month		Coach of the Month		Ref.
Month	Player	Club	Coach	Club	Ref.
August 2019	(Ukraine) Nazariy Rusyn	Zorya Luhansk	(Ukraine) Viktor Skrypnyk	Zorya Luhansk	
September 2019	(Ukraine) Bohdan Mykhaylichenko	Zorya Luhansk	(Ukraine) Oleksandr Ryabokon	Desna Chernihiv	
October 2019	(Ukraine) Bohdan Lyednyev	Zorya Luhansk	(Ukraine) Viktor Skrypnyk	Zorya Luhansk	
November 2019	(Ukraine) Yehor Nazaryna	Karpaty Lviv	(Spain) Vicente Gómez	Olimpik Donetsk	
December 2019	(Ukraine) Bohdan Mykhaylichenko	Zorya Luhansk	(Ukraine) Viktor Skrypnyk	Zorya Luhansk	
February 2020	(Ukraine) Vladyslav Supriaha	SC Dnipro-1	(Ukraine) Yuriy Maksymov	Vorskla Poltava	
March 2020	(Ukraine) Bohdan Mykhaylichenko	Zorya Luhansk	(Ukraine) Oleksandr Ryabokon	Desna Chernihiv	
June 2020	(Ukraine) Vitaliy Buyalskyi	Dynamo Kyiv	(Ukraine) Oleksandr Ryabokon	Desna Chernihiv	
July 2020	(Slovenia) Benjamin Verbič	Dynamo Kyiv	(Ukraine) Ruslan Kostyshyn	Kolos Kovalivka	

=== Round awards ===
Round	Player			Coach		
Round	Player	Club	Reference	Coach	Club	Reference
Round 1	(Brazil) Taison	Shakhtar Donetsk		(Ukraine) Ruslan Kostyshyn	Kolos Kovalivka	
Round 2	(Ukraine) Vitaliy Buyalskyi	Dynamo Kyiv		(Ukraine) Oleksandr Ryabokon	Desna Chernihiv	
Round 3	(Ukraine) Nazariy Rusyn	Zorya Luhansk		(Portugal) Luís Castro	Shakhtar Donetsk	
Round 4	(Ukraine) Kyrylo Kovalets	FC Oleksandriya		(Ukraine) Volodymyr Sharan	FC Oleksandriya	
Round 5	(Ukraine) Ihor Perduta	Vorskla Poltava		(Ukraine) Bohdan Blavatskyi	FC Lviv	
Round 6	(Ukraine) Bohdan Mykhaylichenko	Zorya Luhansk		(Ukraine) Viktor Skrypnyk	Zorya Luhansk	
Round 7	(Ukraine) Vladyslav Kalitvintsev	Desna Chernihiv		(Ukraine) Oleksandr Ryabokon	Desna Chernihiv	
Round 8	(Uruguay) Carlos de Pena	Dynamo Kyiv		(Ukraine) Oleksiy Mykhaylychenko	Dynamo Kyiv	
Round 9	(Ukraine) Oleksandr Filippov	Desna Chernihiv		(Ukraine) Oleksandr Ryabokon	Desna Chernihiv	
Round 10	(Ukraine) Artem Besyedin	Dynamo Kyiv		(Ukraine) Volodymyr Sharan	FC Oleksandriya	
Round 11	(Ukraine) Vitalii Mykolenko	Dynamo Kyiv		(Ukraine) Viktor Skrypnyk	Zorya Luhansk	
Round 12	(Ukraine) Bohdan Lyednyev	Zorya Luhansk		(Ukraine) Oleksandr Ryabokon	Desna Chernihiv	
Round 13	(Ukraine) Kyrylo Kovalets	FC Oleksandriya		(Spain) Vicente Gómez	Olimpik Donetsk	
Round 14	(Ukraine) Yehor Nazaryna	Karpaty Lviv		(Portugal) Luís Castro	Shakhtar Donetsk	
Round 15	(Ukraine) Júnior Moraes	Shakhtar Donetsk		(Ukraine) Ruslan Kostyshyn	Kolos Kovalivka	
Round 16	(Ukraine) Artem Besyedin	Dynamo Kyiv		(Ukraine) Oleksandr Ryabokon	Desna Chernihiv	
Round 17	(Ukraine) Bohdan Mykhaylichenko	Zorya Luhansk		(Ukraine) Viktor Skrypnyk	Zorya Luhansk	
Round 18	(Ukraine) Júnior Moraes	Shakhtar Donetsk		(Armenia) Yegishe Melikyan	FC Lviv	
winter break
Round 19	(Ukraine) Yevhen Smyrnyi	Kolos Kovalivka		(Ukraine) Viktor Skrypnyk	Zorya Luhansk	
Round 20	(Ukraine) Vladyslav Supriaha	SC Dnipro-1		(Ukraine) Dmytro Mykhaylenko	SC Dnipro-1	
Round 21	(Ukraine) Maksym Tretyakov	FC Oleksandriya		(Ukraine) Volodymyr Sharan	FC Oleksandriya	
Round 22	(Ukraine) Vadym Milko	Kolos Kovalivka		(Ukraine) Oleksandr Ryabokon	Desna Chernihiv	
Round 23	(Ukraine) Bohdan Mykhaylichenko	Zorya Luhansk		(Ukraine) Viktor Skrypnyk	Zorya Luhansk	
Round 24	(Ukraine) Marlos	Shakhtar Donetsk		(Portugal) Luís Castro	Shakhtar Donetsk	
Round 25	(Ukraine) Vitalii Mykolenko	Dynamo Kyiv		(Ukraine) Oleksiy Mykhaylychenko	Dynamo Kyiv	
Round 26	(Ukraine) Oleksandr Filippov	Desna Chernihiv		(Ukraine) Oleksandr Ryabokon	Desna Chernihiv	
Round 27	(Brazil) Tetê	Shakhtar Donetsk		(Ukraine) Viktor Skrypnyk	Zorya Luhansk	
Round 28	(Ukraine) Andriy Hitchenko	Desna Chernihiv		(Ukraine) Oleksandr Ryabokon	Desna Chernihiv	
Round 29	(Ukraine) Denys Favorov	Desna Chernihiv		(Ukraine) Oleksandr Ryabokon	Desna Chernihiv	
Round 30	(Ukraine) Vladyslav Kocherhin	Zorya Luhansk		(Ukraine) Viktor Skrypnyk	Zorya Luhansk	
Round 31	(Ukraine) Viktor Tsyhankov	Dynamo Kyiv		(Ukraine) Oleksiy Mykhaylychenko	Dynamo Kyiv	
Round 32	(Ukraine) Dmytro Khomchenovskyi	Zorya Luhansk		(Ukraine) Ruslan Kostyshyn	Kolos Kovalivka	

=== Season awards ===
The laureates of the 2019–20 UPL season were:

- Best player: (Brazil) Taison (Shakhtar Donetsk)
- Best coach: (Ukraine) Viktor Skrypnyk (Zorya Luhansk)
- Best goalkeeper: (Ukraine) Andriy Pyatov (Shakhtar Donetsk)
- Best arbiter: (Ukraine) Kateryna Monzul (Kharkiv)
- Best young player: (Ukraine) Vladyslav Supriaha (Dynamo Kyiv)
- Best goalscorer: (Ukraine) Júnior Moraes (Shakhtar Donetsk)
- Fair Play award: Desna Chernihiv

== See also ==
- 2019–20 Ukrainian First League
- 2019–20 Ukrainian Second League
- 2019–20 Ukrainian Football Amateur League
- 2019–20 Ukrainian Cup
- List of Ukrainian football transfers summer 2019
- List of Ukrainian football transfers winter 2019–20
