= João Teixeira (footballer, born May 1996) =

French/Portuguese footballer

Personal information
- Full name: João Teixeira Almeida
- Date of birth: 7 May 1996 (age 30)
- Place of birth: Forbach, France
- Height: 1.74 m (5 ft 9 in)
- Position: Midfielder

Team information
- Current team: Jeunesse Esch
- Number: 17

Youth career
- 2008–2015: Metz

Senior career*
Years	Team	Apps	(Gls)
2014–2016	Metz B	37	(3)
2016–2017	Sarre-Union	21	(4)
2017–2018	Sarreguemines	21	(1)
2018–2019	Zimbru Chișinău	13	(3)
2019	Politehnica Iași	13	(3)
2019–2020	Oleksandriya	2	(0)
2022–2023	Swift Hesperange	10	(2)
2023–	Jeunesse Esch	76	(11)

International career^{‡}
2014–2015	Portugal U19	3	(0)
- * Club domestic league appearances and goals as of 13 June 2026 ‡ National team caps and goals as of 15 February 2016

João Teixeira Almeida (born 7 May 1996) is a professional footballer who plays as a midfielder for Luxembourgish side Jeunesse Esch. Born in France, Teixeira represents Portugal internationally.

== Club career ==
=== Metz ===
Teixeira is a youth product of Metz, joining the French club when he was twelve years old. He started his football career at the French club's second team, in the summer of 2014. In 2016, after two seasons with Metz B, he terminated his contract by mutual consent.

Later that summer, Teixeira joined fellow Championnat de France Amateur 2 club Sarre-Union, and in the summer of 2017 he moved to Sarreguemines. In August 2018, he moved to Moldovan National Division side Zimbru Chișinău. On 26 August, Teixeira scored his first goal for Zimbru in a 1–0 victory over Speranța Nisporeni.

=== Politehnica Iași ===
In February 2019, after only half a year with Zimbru Chișinău, Teixeira moved to Romanian Liga I club Politehnica Iași. On 10 March, he made his debut for Politehnica Iași in a 2–0 league loss against Voluntari.

=== Oleksandriya ===
In the summer of 2019, Teixeira moved to Ukrainian Premier League club Oleksandriya.

=== Jeunesse Esch ===
On 27 June 2023, João Teixeira signed a contract with Jeunesse Esch in the BGL Ligue.

== Career statistics ==
=== Club ===
As of 19 March 2021

Club statistics
Club	Season	League			Cup		Europe		Other		Total	
Club	Season	Division	Apps	Goals	Apps	Goals	Apps	Goals	Apps	Goals	Apps	Goals
Metz B	2014–15	Championnat de France Amateur	11	0	0	0	—		—		11	0
Metz B	2015–16	Championnat de France Amateur 2	26	3	0	0	—		—		26	3
Metz B	Total		37	3	0	0	—		—		37	3
Sarre-Union	2016–17	Championnat de France Amateur 2	21	4	1	0	—		—		22	4
Sarreguemines	2017–18	Championnat National 3	21	1	0	0	—		—		21	1
Zimbru Chișinău	2018	Moldovan National Division	13	3	2	3	—		—		15	6
Politehnica Iași	2018–19	Liga I	10	3	—		—		—		10	3
Politehnica Iași	2019–20	Liga I	3	0	0	0	—		—		3	0
Politehnica Iași	Total		13	3	0	0	—		—		13	3
Oleksandriya	2019–20	Ukrainian Premier League	2	0	2	0	1	0	—		5	0
Career total			107	14	5	3	1	0	—		113	17
