= Denys Bezborodko =

Ukrainian footballer (born 1994)

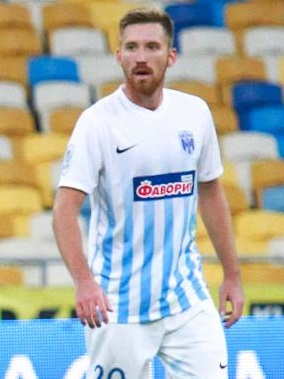

Personal information
- Full name: Denys Olehovych Bezborodko
- Date of birth: 31 May 1994 (age 32)
- Place of birth: Chernihiv, Ukraine
- Height: 1.85 m (6 ft 1 in)
- Position: Forward

Team information
- Current team: Chernihiv
- Number: 21

Youth career
- 2007–2009: Desna Chernihiv
- 2009–2010: Shakhtar Donetsk

Senior career*
Years	Team	Apps	(Gls)
2010–2019	Shakhtar Donetsk	0	(0)
2011–2013	Shakhtar-3 Donetsk	62	(22)
2015	→ Illichivets Mariupol (loan)	15	(4)
2016–2017	→ Zorya Luhansk (loan)	10	(1)
2017–2019	→ Desna Chernihiv (loan)	49	(14)
2019–2020	Oleksandriya	35	(6)
2021–2022	Desna Chernihiv	28	(8)
2022	→ Gyirmót (loan)	3	(0)
2022	→ Zorya Luhansk (loan)	1	(2)
2022–2024	Kolos Kovalivka	61	(4)
2025	Chornomorets Odesa	8	(0)
2025–2026	Kudrivka	3	(0)
2026–	Chernihiv	23	(3)

International career^{‡}
2013	Ukraine U19	4	(1)
2015–2016	Ukraine U21	20	(5)
- * Club domestic league appearances and goals as of 1 November 2026 ‡ National team caps and goals as of 18 October 2021

Denys Olehovych Bezborodko (Ukrainian: Денис Олегович Безбородько; born 31 May 1994) is a Ukrainian professional footballer last played as a forward for Ukrainian side Chernihiv.

== Club career ==
From July 2015, he went on loan for the Ukrainian First League club FC Illichivets Mariupol.

=== Desna Chernihiv ===
In summer 2017 he signed for Desna Chernihiv in the Ukrainian First League on loan from Shakhtar Donetsk. In the 2017–18 season, he scored 9 goals and was named Best Player of Rounds 32 and 34. In the 2018–19 season he helped the team stay up in the Ukrainian Premier League by scoring 5 goals. He ended his contract with Desna Chernihiv, having scored 27 goals in 45 appearances.

=== Oleksandriya ===
In summer 2019 he moved to Oleksandriya in the Ukrainian Premier League. He helped the team to a 5th place finish in the 2019–20 season. He left the club in January 2021.

=== Return to Desna Chernihiv ===
On 16 December 2020, he returned to Desna Chernihiv in the Ukrainian First League. He made his league debut against Dynamo Kyiv on 21 February 2021. On 3 April, he scored his first goal for Desna Chernihiv against Olimpik Donetsk.

He opened his 2021–22 account for Chernihiv on 9 August, scoring two goals against Inhulets Petrove and earning Player of the Week plaudits. On 14 August, he scored again, this time against SC Dnipro-1.

=== Loan to Gyirmót ===
On 26 March 2022 he moved on loan to Gyirmót in Nemzeti Bajnokság I for three months. On 9 April 2022, he made his debut with the new club against Puskás Akadémia.

=== Loan to Zorya Luhansk ===
On 29 July 2022 he signed a loan deal with Zorya Luhansk. On 4 and 11 August he played in 2022–23 UEFA Europa Conference League qualifying matches against Universitatea Craiova.

=== Kolos Kovalivka ===
In August 2022 he moved to Kolos Kovalivka. In January 2025 his contract was expired and not extended by mutual consent of the parties.

=== Chornomorets Odesa ===
In January 2025 he signed for Chornomorets Odesa in Ukrainian Premier League. He made his debut against Kolos Kovalivka on 21 February 2025.

=== Kudrivka ===
Following the summer training session with FC Chernihiv, on 29 July 2025, Denys moved to Kudrivka just promoted in Ukrainian Premier League. In October, he was suspended from the first team and sent to the reserve team.

=== FC Chernihiv ===
On 7 March 2026, he signed for Chernihiv in Ukrainian First League. On 18 March 2026 he made his debut for the new club in the Ukrainian Cup against Feniks-Mariupol helping the club qualify for the semi-finals of the competition. On 29 March 2026, he scored his first goal with the club against Livyi Bereh Kyiv at the Chernihiv Arena. On 2 May 2026, he scored against UCSA Tarasivka at the Stadion Yuvileinyi and due to his performance, he was included in the Best XI of Round 26 of the 2025–26 Ukrainian First League. On 9 May 2026, he scored against Chornomorets Odesa, his ex team, at the Chernihiv Arena. On 20 May 2026, he plays in Ukrainian Cup final against Dynamo Kyiv.

== International career ==
He was a member of the Ukraine under-20 side in November 2013.

== Outside of professional football ==
On 15 June 2025, on the occasion of the 65th anniversary of the foundation of Desna Chernihiv, he scored in the match between Desna Chernihiv stars and the football stars of the Chernihiv's region at the Chernihiv Arena, with the specific goal of raising 1,000,000 hryvnias to support the public organization EVUM, which has been working with children with cancer for over 12 years.

== Career statistics ==
=== Club ===
As of match played 1 November 2026

Appearances and goals by club, season and competition
Club	Season	League			Cup		Continental		Other		Total	
Club	Season	Division	Apps	Goals	Apps	Goals	Apps	Goals	Apps	Goals	Apps	Goals
Shakhtar-3 Donetsk	2010–11	Ukrainian Second League	7	1	0	0	0	0	0	0	7	1
Shakhtar-3 Donetsk	2011–12	Ukrainian Second League	25	8	0	0	0	0	0	0	25	8
Shakhtar-3 Donetsk	2012–13	Ukrainian Second League	30	13	0	0	0	0	0	0	30	13
Shakhtar-3 Donetsk	Total		62	22	0	0	0	0	0	0	62	22
Illichivets Mariupol (loan)	2015–16	Ukrainian First League	15	4	1	0	0	0	0	0	16	4
Illichivets Mariupol (loan)	Total		15	4	1	0	0	0	0	0	16	4
Zorya Luhansk (loan)	2015–16	Ukrainian Premier League	3	0	2	0	0	0	0	0	5	0
Zorya Luhansk (loan)	2016–17	Ukrainian Premier League	6	1	0	0	1 (Note: Appearance(s) in UEFA Europa League)	0	0	0	7	1
Zorya Luhansk (loan)	2017–18	Ukrainian Premier League	1	0	0	0	0	0	0	0	1	0
Zorya Luhansk (loan)	Total		10	1	2	0	1	0	0	0	13	1
Desna Chernihiv (loan)	2017–18	Ukrainian First League	26	9	2	0	0	0	2 (Note: Appearance(s) in Ukrainian First League promotion play-offs)	0	30	9
Desna Chernihiv (loan)	2018–19	Ukrainian Premier League	23	5	1	1	0	0	0	0	24	6
Desna Chernihiv (loan)	Total		49	14	3	1	0	0	2	0	54	15
Oleksandriya	2019–20	Ukrainian Premier League	24	4	2	0	4	1	0	0	30	5
Oleksandriya	2020–21	Ukrainian Premier League	11	2	0	0	0	0	0	0	11	2
Oleksandriya	Total		35	6	2	0	4	1	0	0	41	7
Desna Chernihiv	2020–21	Ukrainian Premier League	10	1	0	0	0	0	0	0	10	1
Desna Chernihiv	2021–22	Ukrainian Premier League	18	7	1	0	0	0	0	0	19	7
Desna Chernihiv	Total		28	8	1	0	0	0	0	0	29	8
Gyirmót (Loan)	2021–22	Nemzeti Bajnokság I	3	0	0	0	0	0	0	0	3	0
Zorya Luhansk (Loan)	2022–23	Ukrainian Premier League	1	2	0	0	2 (Note: two appearances in 2022–23 UEFA Europa Conference League Third qualifying round)	0	0	0	3	2
Kolos Kovalivka	2022–23	Ukrainian Premier League	24	2	0	0	0	0	0	0	24	2
Kolos Kovalivka	2023–24	Ukrainian Premier League	26	2	1	0	0	0	0	0	27	2
Kolos Kovalivka	2024–25	Ukrainian Premier League	11	0	1	0	0	0	0	0	12	0
Chornomorets Odesa	2024–25	Ukrainian Premier League	8	0	0	0	0	0	0	0	8	0
Kudrivka	2025–26	Ukrainian Premier League	3	0	1	0	0	0	0	0	4	0
Chernihiv	2025–26	Ukrainian First League	13	3	3	0	0	0	0	0	16	3
Chernihiv	2026–27	Ukrainian First League	10	0	3	1	0	0	0	0	13	1
Career total			298	64	19	2	7	1	2	0	325	67

=== International ===
As of match played 9 April 2022

Appearances and goals by national team and year
National team	Year	Apps	Goals
Ukraine U21
Ukraine U21	2015	10	2
Ukraine U21	2016	10	3
Total		20	5

Appearances and goals by national team and year
National team	Year	Apps	Goals
Ukraine U19
Ukraine U19	2013	4	1
Total		4	1

== Honours ==
Chernihiv

- Ukrainian Cup runner-up: 2025–26

Zorya Luhansk

- Ukrainian Cup runner-up: 2015–16

Desna Chernihiv

- Ukrainian First League: 2017–18

Individual

- Desna Chernihiv Player of the Year: (2) 2018, 2022
- Top Scorer Ukrainian youth championship: Runner Up 2014–15 (10 goals)
- Top Scorer Ukrainian Second League: Runner-up 2012–13 (13 goals)
- Best player round 3 Ukrainian Premier League: 2021-22
- Best player round 13 Ukrainian Premier League: 2018–19
- Best player round 32 Ukrainian First League: 2017–18
- Best Player round 34 Ukrainian First League: 2017–18
- Honoured Master of Sport of Ukraine

== Gallery ==
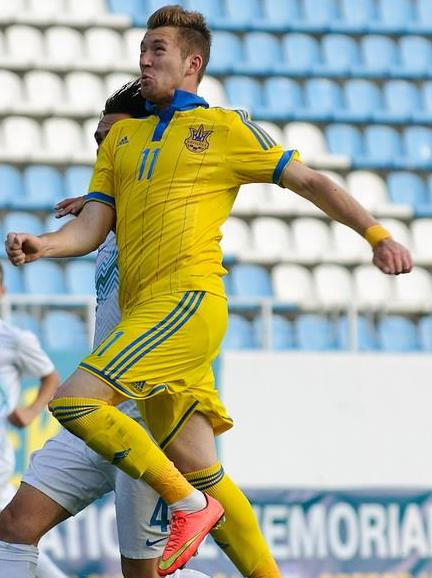
Bezborodko playing for Ukraine U21

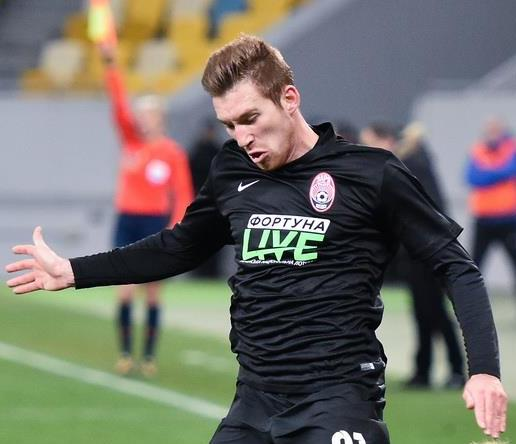
Bezborodko playing for Zorya Luhansk

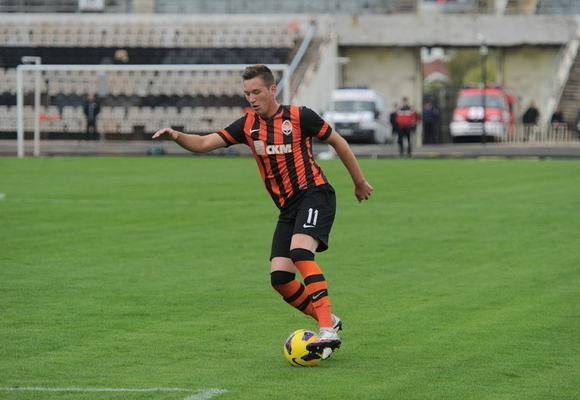
Bezborodko playing for Shakhtar Donetsk

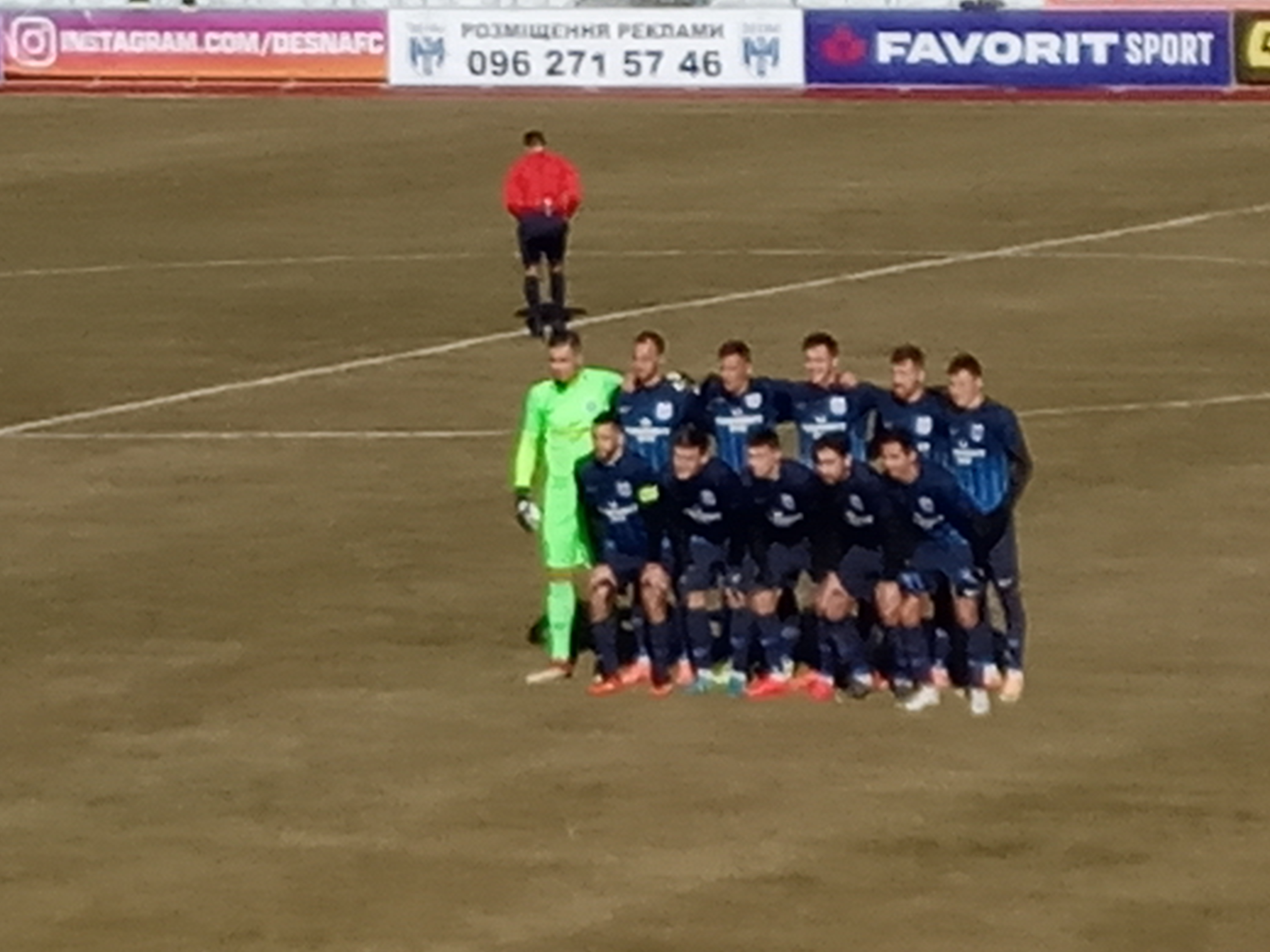
Denys Bezborodko with Desna Chernihiv
