= Bohdan Mykhaylichenko =

Ukrainian footballer

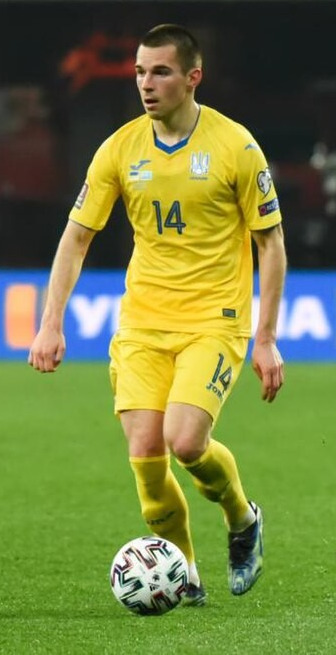

Personal information
- Full name: Bohdan Vasyliovych Mykhaylichenko
- Date of birth: 21 March 1997 (age 29)
- Place of birth: Boryspil, Ukraine
- Height: 1.75 m (5 ft 9 in)
- Position: Left-back

Team information
- Current team: Polissya Zhytomyr
- Number: 15

Youth career
- 2009–2010: Knyazha Shchaslyve
- 2010–2014: Dynamo Kyiv

Senior career*
Years	Team	Apps	(Gls)
2014–2019	Dynamo Kyiv	1	(0)
2017	→ Stal Kamianske (loan)	16	(0)
2018–2019	→ Zorya Luhansk (loan)	21	(0)
2019–2020	Zorya Luhansk	29	(3)
2020–2023	Anderlecht	41	(1)
2022–2023	→ Shakhtar Donetsk (loan)	25	(2)
2023–2024	Dinamo Zagreb	6	(0)
2024–	Polissya Zhytomyr	68	(1)

International career^{‡}
2012–2013	Ukraine U16	18	(3)
2013–2014	Ukraine U17	13	(3)
2015	Ukraine U18	3	(1)
2014–2015	Ukraine U19	9	(0)
2016	Ukraine U20	1	(0)
2016–2018	Ukraine U21	6	(0)
2020–	Ukraine	15	(0)
- * Club domestic league appearances and goals as of 3 June 2026 ‡ National team caps and goals as of 28 September 2026

Bohdan Vasyliovych Mykhaylichenko (Ukrainian: Богда́н Васи́льович Михайліче́нко; born 21 March 1997) is a Ukrainian professional footballer who plays as a left-back for Polissya Zhytomyr and the Ukraine national team.

== Club career ==
Born in Boryspil, Kyiv Oblast, Ukraine, Mykhaylichenko is a product of the Dynamo Kyiv and Knyazha Shaslyve sportive schools. His first trainer was Oleksandr Kurylko.

=== Dynamo Kyiv ===
He made his debut in the Ukrainian Premier League for Dynamo on 24 May 2015 against Karpaty Lviv.

=== Anderlecht ===
On 21 July 2020, acting general director of FC Zorya Luhansk, Stanyslav Ohanov, announced that Mykhaylichenko was moving to Belgian club Anderlecht on 1 August 2020. On 3 August 2020 he was officially presented as an Anderlecht player.

==== Shakhtar Donetsk (loan) ====
On 27 July 2022, Anderlecht announced that they had loaned Mykhaylichenko to Shakhtar Donetsk with an option to buy.

== International career ==
Mykhaylichenko made his professional debut with the Ukraine in a 2-1 UEFA Nations League win over Switzerland on 3 September 2020.

In May 2024, he was on the list of 26 players summoned by Serhiy Rebrov for the UEFA Euro 2024.

== Honours ==
Dynamo Kyiv

- Ukrainian Premier League: 2014–15

Individual

- Ukrainian Premier League player of the Month (3): 2019–20 (September), 2019–20 (December), 2019–20 (March)
