= Bohdan Lytvyak =

Ukrainian footballer

Personal information
- Full name: Bohdan Olehovych Lytvyak
- Date of birth: 5 May 1998 (age 28)
- Place of birth: Kryvyi Rih, Dnipropetrovsk Oblast, Ukraine
- Height: 1.83 m (6 ft 0 in)
- Position: Midfielder

Youth career
- 2009–2015: Kryvbas Kryvyi Rih

Senior career*
Years	Team	Apps	(Gls)
2015–2020	Oleksandriya	0	(0)
2020	Kremin Kremenchuk	10	(0)
2020	Inhulets Petrove	2	(0)
2021	Hirnyk-Sport Horishni Plavni	3	(0)
2021	Peremoha Dnipro	20	(4)
- * Club domestic league appearances and goals as of 5 January 2022

Bohdan Lytvyak (Ukrainian: Богдан Олегович Литвяк; born 5 May 1998) is a Ukrainian football midfielder.

== Career ==
Lytvyak is a product of his native Kryvbas Kryvyi Rih youth sportive system.

He made his debut in the Ukrainian Premier League for Inhulets Petrove as a second half-time substituted player in a home drawing match against FC Mariupol on 25 October 2020.
