= Maksym Bilyi =

Maksym Bilyi is the name of two Ukrainian football players:

- Maksym Bilyi (footballer, born 1989) (1989–2013), Ukrainian football midfielder
- Maksym Bilyi (footballer, born 1990), Ukrainian football defender
