= Bila River =

Bila River may refer to:

- Bila River (Bosnia and Herzegovina), a river in Bosnia and Herzegovina
- Bila River (Indonesia), a river in Indonesia
- Bila River (Romania), a river in Romania

== See also ==
- Bila, A River Cycle, an Indigenous Australian poem, and cancelled book.
