= Číměř (Třebíč District) =

- Municipality
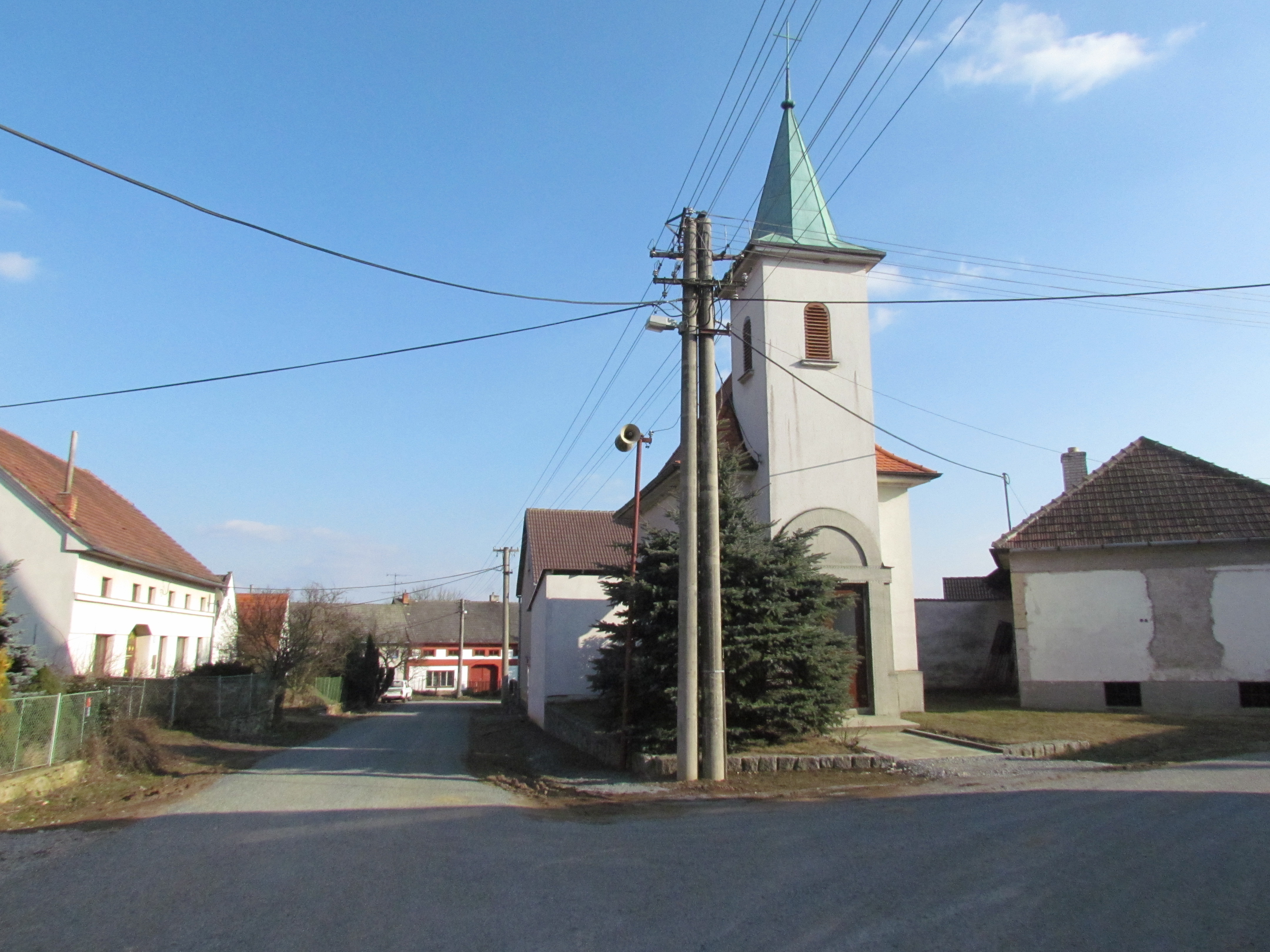
- Centre of Číměř

- Flag Coat of arms

- Location in the Czech Republic
- Coordinates: 49°12′0″N 15°59′54″E
- Country: Czech Republic
- Region: Vysočina
- District: Třebíč
- First mentioned: 1115

Area
  - Total: 4.34 km^{2} (1.68 sq mi)
- Elevation: 450 m (1,480 ft)

Population (2026-01-01)
  - Total: 238
  - Density: 54.8/km^{2} (142/sq mi)
- Time zone: UTC+1 (CET)
  - Summer (DST): UTC+2 (CEST)
- Postal code: 675 01
- Website: www.cimer.cz

Číměř is a municipality and village in Třebíč District in the Vysočina Region of the Czech Republic. It has about 200 inhabitants.

Číměř lies approximately 10 kilometres (6 mi) east of Třebíč, 37 km (23 mi) south-east of Jihlava, and 150 km (93 mi) south-east of Prague.

== Demographics ==
Historical population
Year	Pop.	±%
1869	192	—
1880	196	+2.1%
1890	184	−6.1%
1900	191	+3.8%
1910	189	−1.0%
1921	213	+12.7%
1930	218	+2.3%
1950	176	−19.3%
1961	171	−2.8%
1970	217	+26.9%
1980	210	−3.2%
1991	214	+1.9%
2001	215	+0.5%
2011	215	+0.0%
2021	191	−11.2%
Source: Censuses
