= Oleksii Bilyi =

Ukrainian politician

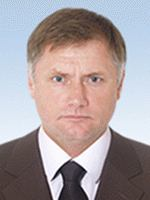
Image of Oleksii Bilyi

Oleksii Petrovych Bilyi (Ukrainian: Білий Олексій Петрович; born 1 May 1961) is a Ukrainian businessman and politician. Hwas a Head of the Mariupol Iron & Steel Works (until 2006). He is a member of the Ukrainian parliament (since November 2007), and a member of the Economic Policy Committee (since December 2007).

== Biography ==
Bilyi was born on 1 May 1961 in the village of Kamyanka, Apostolove Raion, Dnipropetrovsk Oblast, Ukrainian SSR, Soviet Union. Family: wife Irina (b. 1971) a teacher at Donetsk National University; two sons, Oleksandr (b. 1998) and Arseniy (b. 2003), daughter Amelia (b.2003).

=== Education ===
Bilyi attended Dnipropetrovsk Metallurgical Institute (1988) with a major in "Chemical technology of fuel," and Donetsk National University (2001), majoring in Business Economics. From 1979 to 1981 he served in the Soviet Army.

=== Career ===
- 1981–1988 – worked as a fitter, site supervisor, senior master, and Deputy Chief of coke workshop at Kryvyi Rih coke plant.
- 1988–1990 – Chief of the coke workshop, Chief engineer.
- 1990–1996 — Director of the Yenakiieve coke plant.
- 1996–1998 – Chairman of the management board, JSC "Yenakiieve Coke Plant," Head of the plant.
- 1998–2000 – Chairman of the management board, JSC "Yenakiieve Metallurgical Plant".
- 2000–2002 – Deputy Chairman of Donetsk State Regional Administration on primary industries and energy.
- 2002–2006 – CEO of Mariupol Iron & Steel Works.

In November 2007, Oleksii was elected to the Verkhovna Rada with the Party of Regions, No.33 in the list.

- Chairman of the Subcommittee on government policy on the consumption of waste and scrap iron, Verkhovna Rada committee on economic policy.
- Member of the Permanent Delegation of the Parliamentary Assembly of GUAM.

In the 2014 Ukrainian parliamentary election, he was re-elected into parliament; this time being placed 5th on the electoral list of the Opposition Bloc.

== Awards ==
- Order of Merit, III class (2011), for personal contribution to nation-building, long-term legislative and political activity.
- Merited Worker of Industry of Ukraine (title) (2003).
- Medal "10 Years of Independence of Ukraine" (2001).
- "Miner's Glory" badge, III class (2002).

== See also ==
- 2007 Ukrainian parliamentary election
- List of Ukrainian Parliament Members 2007
- Verkhovna Rada
