= Číměř (Jindřichův Hradec District) =

- Municipality
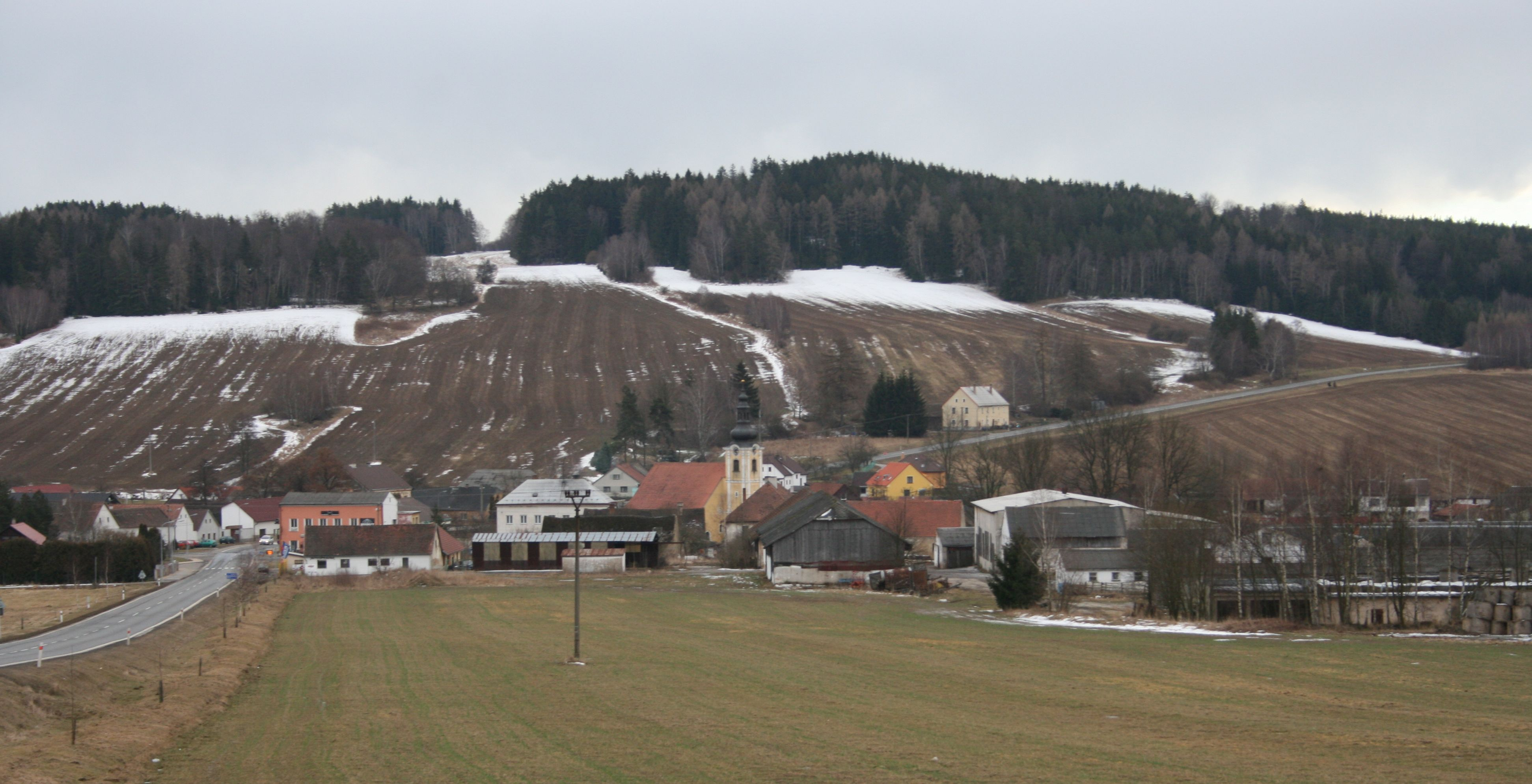
- View from the northwest

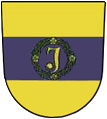
- Flag Coat of arms

- Location in the Czech Republic
- Coordinates: 49°3′38″N 15°4′25″E
- Country: Czech Republic
- Region: South Bohemian
- District: Jindřichův Hradec
- First mentioned: 1359

Area
  - Total: 45.78 km^{2} (17.68 sq mi)
- Elevation: 519 m (1,703 ft)

Population (2026-01-01)
  - Total: 679
  - Density: 14.8/km^{2} (38.4/sq mi)
- Time zone: UTC+1 (CET)
  - Summer (DST): UTC+2 (CEST)
- Postal codes: 378 02, 378 32, 378 33
- Website: www.obeccimer.cz

Číměř is a municipality and village in Jindřichův Hradec District in the South Bohemian Region of the Czech Republic. It has about 700 inhabitants.

Číměř lies approximately 11 kilometres (7 mi) south-east of Jindřichův Hradec, 46 km (29 mi) east of České Budějovice, and 123 km (76 mi) south-east of Prague.

== Administrative division ==
Číměř consists of seven municipal parts (in brackets population according to the 2021 census):

- Číměř (383)
- Bílá (15)
- Dobrá Voda (41)
- Lhota (50)
- Nová Ves (47)
- Potočná (43)
- Sedlo (106)

== Demographics ==
Historical population
Year	Pop.	±%
1869	2,623	—
1880	2,658	+1.3%
1890	2,505	−5.8%
1900	2,418	−3.5%
1910	2,226	−7.9%
1921	2,066	−7.2%
1930	1,982	−4.1%
1950	1,372	−30.8%
1961	1,006	−26.7%
1970	896	−10.9%
1980	821	−8.4%
1991	665	−19.0%
2001	652	−2.0%
2011	693	+6.3%
2021	685	−1.2%
Source: Censuses
