= Kyrylo Kovalets =

Ukrainian footballer

Personal information
- Full name: Kyrylo Serhiyovych Kovalets
- Date of birth: 2 July 1993 (age 33)
- Place of birth: Kyiv, Ukraine
- Height: 1.78 m (5 ft 10 in)
- Position: Midfielder

Team information
- Current team: Epitsentr Kamianets-Podilskyi
- Number: 6

Youth career
- 2003–2007: Lokomotyv Kyiv
- 2007–2010: Metalist Kharkiv

Senior career*
Years	Team	Apps	(Gls)
2010–2012	Obolon Kyiv	3	(0)
2013–2015	Shakhtar-3 Donetsk	50	(9)
2015–2018	Chornomorets Odesa	70	(4)
2018–2025	Oleksandriya	154	(26)
2026–	Epitsentr Kamianets-Podilskyi	11	(1)

International career^{‡}
2013	Ukraine U21	3	(0)
- * Club domestic league appearances and goals as of 3 June 2026 ‡ National team caps and goals as of 20 June 2018

Kyrylo Serhiyovych Kovalets (Ukrainian: Кирило Сергійович Ковалець; born 2 July 1993) is a Ukrainian professional footballer who plays as a midfielder for Ukrainian club Epitsentr Kamianets-Podilskyi.

== Career ==
Kyrylo Kovalets is product of youth team systems of FC Metalist Kharkiv. Made his debut for FC Obolon entering as a substituted player in game against FC Illichivets Mariupol on 22 October 2011 in Ukrainian Premier League.

On 9 July 2015, Kovalets joined Chornomorets Odesa.

On 1 July 2018, Kyrylo Kovalets joined FC Oleksandriya, after leaving Chornomorets Odesa.

On 27 January 2026, Kovalets joined Epitsentr Kamianets-Podilskyi after leaving FC Oleksandriya. As a player for Epitsentr, he made his debut against LNZ Cherkasy on 21 February 2026.

== Personal life ==
His father Serhiy Kovalets, a native of Crimea, is a former international Ukrainian football midfielder, and current football manager.

He is married to Olena, a sister of another Ukrainian football player Roman Zozulya, and has two children.
