= Maksym Tretyakov =

Ukrainian footballer

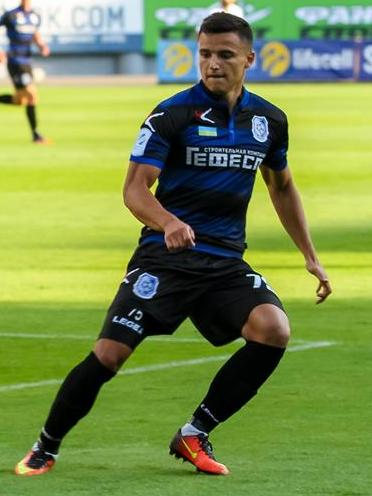
- Tretyakov in 2017

Personal information
- Full name: Maksym Vyacheslavovych Tretyakov
- Date of birth: 6 March 1996 (age 30)
- Place of birth: Troitsko-Safonove, Mykolaiv Oblast, Ukraine
- Height: 1.75 m (5 ft 9 in)
- Position: Midfielder

Team information
- Current team: Obolon Kyiv
- Number: 75

Youth career
- 2006–2012: Dnipro Dnipropetrovsk

Senior career*
Years	Team	Apps	(Gls)
2012–2016	Dnipro Dnipropetrovsk	0	(0)
2016	→ Metalist Kharkiv (loan)	8	(0)
2016–2018	Chornomorets Odesa	48	(4)
2018–2020	DAC Dunajská Streda	17	(1)
2019–2020	→ Oleksandriya (loan)	30	(10)
2020–2023	Oleksandriya	61	(15)
2023–2024	Dnipro-1	6	(1)
2024–2025	Kolos Kovalivka	33	(2)
2026	Obolon Kyiv	11	(1)
2026 -	FC Oleksandriya	14	(3)

International career^{‡}
2012	Ukraine U16	3	(1)
2011–2013	Ukraine U17	20	(2)
2014–2015	Ukraine U18	4	(0)
2014–2016	Ukraine U19	12	(0)
2016–2018	Ukraine U21	13	(0)
- * Club domestic league appearances and goals as of 25/10/26 @ 15:14(AEST) ‡ National team caps and goals as of 19 August 2020

Maksym Vyacheslavovych Tretyakov (Ukrainian: Максим В'ячеславович Третьяков; born 6 March 1996) is a Ukrainian professional footballer who plays as a midfielder for Ukrainian club Obolon Kyiv.

== Career ==
Tretyakov is a product of the FC Dnipro School System from age 10.

He spent his career in the Ukrainian Premier League Reserves club FC Dnipro. In February 2016 Tretyakov went on loan in FC Metalist and was promoted to the Ukrainian Premier League's squad. He made his debut for Metalist Kharkiv in the Ukrainian Premier League in a match against FC Volyn Lutsk on 6 March 2016.

On 13 July 2024, Tretyakov signed with Kolos Kovalivka.

On 27 February 2026, Tretyakov has left Kolos Kovalivka and joined Obolon Kyiv. On 1 March 2026 in the 18th round match of Ukrainian Premier League 2025–26 between FC Obolon and Rukh Lviv he made his official debut as player of Obolon.
