= Oleh Bilyk =

Ukrainian footballer

Personal information
- Full name: Oleh Stepanovych Bilyk
- Date of birth: 11 January 1998 (age 28)
- Place of birth: Pidvolochysk, Ternopil Oblast, Ukraine
- Height: 1.87 m (6 ft 2 in)
- Position: Goalkeeper

Team information
- Current team: Epitsentr Kamianets-Podilskyi
- Number: 31

Youth career
- 2008–2011: DYuSSh Pidvolochysk
- 2011–2012: Ternopil
- 2012–2015: Skala Stryi

Senior career*
Years	Team	Apps	(Gls)
2015–2019	Skala Stryi	31	(0)
2019–2023	Oleksandriya	43	(0)
2023	Inhulets Petrove	8	(0)
2023–2024	Chornomorets Odesa	2	(0)
2024–	Epitsentr Kamianets-Podilskyi	49	(0)

International career^{‡}
2016	Ukraine U19	3	(0)
2019–2020	Ukraine U21	8	(0)
- * Club domestic league appearances and goals as of 3 June 2026 ‡ National team caps and goals as of 6 September 2019

Oleh Stepanovych Bilyk (Ukrainian: Олег Степанович Білик; born 11 January 1998) is a Ukrainian professional footballer who plays as a goalkeeper for Epitsentr Kamianets-Podilskyi.

== Career ==
Bilyk is a product of Youth Sportive School from his native Pidvolochysk in Ternopil Oblast, FC Ternopil and Skala Stryi Sportive Systems. In July 2016 he was promoted to the Skala main squad to compete in the Ukrainian First League.

He made his debut for FC Skala in a game against FC Poltava on 30 October 2016 in the Ukrainian First League.

In February 2019 Bilyk signed a contract with the Ukrainian Premier League FC Oleksandriya.

In January 2023 he moved to Inhulets Petrove.
