= List of Ukrainian football transfers winter 2019–20 =

This is a list of Ukrainian football transfers winter 2019–20. Only clubs in 2019–20 Ukrainian Premier League and 2019–20 Ukrainian First League are included.

== Ukrainian Premier League ==
=== Desna Chernihiv ===
In:

No.	Pos.	Nation	Player
—	DF	EST	Joonas Tamm (from (Estonia) Flora Tallinn)
—	MF	UKR	Levan Arveladze (from Zorya Luhansk)
—	MF	UKR	Andriy Totovytskyi (from Shakhtar Donetsk)
—	FW	UKR	Pylyp Budkivskyi (from Zorya Luhansk)
—	FW	UKR	Oleksiy Hutsulyak (from Karpaty Lviv)

Out:

No.	Pos.	Nation	Player
—	DF	UKR	Vitaliy Pryndeta (to Volyn Lutsk)
—	MF	UKR	Andriy Bohdanov (to Kolos Kovalivka)
—	MF	UKR	Artem Favorov (to (Hungary) Puskás Akadémia)
—	MF	UKR	Renat Mochulyak (to (Moldova) Sfântul Gheorghe Suruceni)
—	FW	UKR	Maksym Dehtyarov (loan return to Olimpik Donetsk)

=== Dnipro-1 ===
In:

No.	Pos.	Nation	Player
—	DF	UKR	Volodymyr Adamyuk (from FC Lviv)
—	DF	BRA	Lucas Taylor (from (Portugal) Estoril)
—	DF	UKR	Oleksandr Svatok (from (Croatia) Hajduk Split)
—	DF	UKR	Andriy Tsurikov (from (Czech Republic) Jablonec)
—	MF	UKR	Nazariy Bohomaz (on loan from Volyn Lutsk)
—	FW	ARG	Francisco Di Franco (from Karpaty Lviv)
—	FW	UKR	Oleksiy Khoblenko (from (Belarus) Dynamo Brest)

Out:

No.	Pos.	Nation	Player
—	DF	UKR	Oleksandr Safronov (on loan to (Estonia) Levadia Tallinn)
—	MF	UKR	Oleksandr Byelyayev (to (Georgia (country)) Saburtalo Tbilisi)
—	MF	GEO	Aleksandre Kobakhidze (to (Georgia (country)) Locomotive Tbilisi)
—	MF	UKR	Yuriy Romanyuk (to Rukh Lviv)
—	MF	UKR	Ihor Zahalskyi (to Inhulets Petrove)
—	FW	CAN	Aramis Kouzine (to (Denmark) Aalborg)
—	FW	UKR	Stanislav Kulish (to Volyn Lutsk)

=== Dynamo Kyiv ===
In:

No.	Pos.	Nation	Player
—	DF	UKR	Vladyslav Dubinchak (loan return from Karpaty Lviv)
—	DF	GEO	Luka Lochoshvili (loan return from (Slovakia) Žilina)
—	DF	UKR	Roman Vantukh (loan return from Olimpik Donetsk)
—	MF	NGA	Benito (from (Russia) Tambov)
—	MF	PAR	Derlis González (loan return from (Brazil) Santos)
—	FW	BEL	Ibrahim Kargbo Jr. (from (Belgium) Roeselare)
—	FW	LUX	Gerson Rodrigues (loan return from (Turkey) Ankaragücü)
—	FW	UKR	Nazariy Rusyn (loan return from Zorya Luhansk)

Out:

No.	Pos.	Nation	Player
—	GK	UKR	Volodymyr Makhankov (to Karpaty Lviv)
—	DF	UKR	Taras Dmytruk (to Vorskla Poltava)
—	DF	HUN	Tamás Kádár (to (China) Shandong Luneng)
—	DF	UKR	Mykyta Kravchenko (on loan to Olimpik Donetsk)
—	DF	GEO	Luka Lochoshvili (to (Georgia (country)) Dinamo Tbilisi)
—	DF	BRA	Sidcley (on loan to (Brazil) Corinthians)
—	DF	UKR	Roman Vantukh (on loan to FC Oleksandriya)
—	DF	PER	Carlos Zambrano (to (Argentina) Boca Juniors)
—	MF	PAR	Derlis González (to (Paraguay) Club Olimpia)
—	MF	UKR	Denys Harmash (on loan to (Turkey) Rizespor)
—	MF	UKR	Artem Kulakovskyi (to Vorskla Poltava)
—	MF	UKR	Denys Yanakov (on loan to Chornomorets Odesa)
—	FW	LUX	Gerson Rodrigues (on loan to (Turkey) Ankaragücü)

=== Karpaty Lviv ===
In:

No.	Pos.	Nation	Player
—	GK	UKR	Anton Kanibolotskiy (free agent)
—	GK	UKR	Volodymyr Makhankov (from Dynamo Kyiv)
—	DF	GEO	Andro Giorgadze (from (Czech Republic) Fastav Zlín)
—	DF	UKR	Vasyl Pryima (from (Belarus) Shakhtyor Soligorsk)
—	MF	COL	Jorge Carrascal (loan return from (Argentina) River Plate)
—	MF	UKR	Oleksiy Khakhlyov (free agent)
—	MF	UKR	Hennadiy Pasich (from Olimpik Donetsk)
—	MF	UKR	Volodymyr Tanchyk (from Chornomorets Odesa)
—	FW	SEN	Matar Dieye (on loan from Olimpik Donetsk)

Out:

No.	Pos.	Nation	Player
—	GK	UKR	Andriy Artym (on loan to Ahrobiznes Volochysk)
—	GK	UKR	Roman Pidkivka
—	DF	LUX	Marvin da Graça
—	DF	UKR	Vladyslav Dubinchak (loan return to Dynamo Kyiv)
—	DF	LUX	Tim Hall
—	DF	UKR	Oleksandr Kucher (retired)
—	DF	UKR	Oleksiy Kovtun (to (Belarus) Rukh Brest)
—	DF	UKR	Vasyl Pryima
—	DF	UKR	Serhiy Vakulenko (to Ararat-Armenia)
—	DF	UKR	Bohdan Veklyak (to Hirnyk-Sport Horishni Plavni)
—	MF	UKR	Andriy Busko (to FC Lviv)
—	MF	COL	Jorge Carrascal (to (Argentina) River Plate)
—	MF	UKR	Maksym Hrysyo (to FC Cherkashchyna)
—	MF	UKR	Artem Kozak
—	MF	UGA	Melvyn Lorenzen
—	MF	UKR	Yehor Nazaryna (loan return to (Belgium) Royal Antwerp)
—	MF	UKR	Roman Tolochko (on loan to FC Kalush)
—	MF	UKR	Nazar Verbnyi (to Olimpik Donetsk)
—	MF	CRO	Frane Vojković (to (Croatia) Lokomotiva Zagreb)
—	FW	BRA	João Diogo (loan return to (Brazil) Figueirense)
—	FW	ARG	Francisco Di Franco (to SC Dnipro-1)
—	FW	SEN	Matar Dieye (loan return to Olimpik Donetsk)
—	FW	UKR	Oleksiy Hutsulyak (to Desna Chernihiv)
—	FW	BLR	Kirill Kirilenko
—	FW	POR	Cristian Ponde

=== Kolos Kovalivka ===
In:

No.	Pos.	Nation	Player
—	GK	UKR	Yevhen Kucherenko (from (Portugal) Leiria)
—	DF	UKR	Vladyslav Okhronchuk (loan return from Podillya Khmelnytskyi)
—	DF	UKR	Kyrylo Petrov (from (Azerbaijan) Neftçi Baku)
—	DF	UKR	Yevhen Yefremov (from Obolon-Brovar Kyiv)
—	DF	UKR	Vladyslav Yemets (on loan from Zorya Luhansk)
—	MF	UKR	Andriy Bohdanov (from Desna Chernihiv)
—	MF	SEN	Mamadou Danfa (from (Senegal) Casa Sports)
—	MF	LVA	Vladislavs Soloveičiks (from (Latvia) Valmieras)
—	FW	UKR	Denys Antyukh (loan return from Balkany Zorya)
—	FW	UKR	Rustam Akhmedzade (loan return to Podillya Khmelnytskyi)

Out:

No.	Pos.	Nation	Player
—	DF	UKR	Oleksandr Mihunov (to (Belarus) Rukh Brest)
—	DF	UKR	Vladyslav Okhronchuk (to MFC Mykolaiv)
—	DF	UKR	Andriy Sakhnevych (to (Latvia) Ventspils)
—	MF	UKR	Kamil Khuchbarov (to VPK-Ahro Shevchenkivka)
—	MF	UKR	Dzhemal Kyzylatesh (to Volyn Lutsk)
—	MF	UKR	Illya Malyshkin (to Hirnyk-Sport Horishni Plavni)
—	MF	UKR	Oleh Osypenko (to (Czech Republic) Viktoria Žižkov)
—	MF	UKR	Oleksandr Pozdeyev (retired)
—	MF	UKR	Dmytro Rozhko (to FC Cherkashchyna)
—	MF	UKR	Vyacheslav Ryabov (to Hirnyk Kryvyi Rih)
—	MF	UKR	Vladyslav Nekhtiy (to Avanhard Kramatorsk)
—	FW	UKR	Rustam Akhmedzade (on loan to Podillya Khmelnytskyi)
—	FW	UKR	Rustam Akhmedzade ((on loan?) to FC Mynai)

=== Lviv ===
In:

No.	Pos.	Nation	Player
—	GK	UKR	Herman Penkov (from Olimpik Donetsk)
—	DF	FRA	Joël Bopesu (from (Latvia) Riga)
—	DF	UKR	Yehor Klymenchuk (from Olimpik Donetsk)
—	DF	UKR	Yuriy Kravchuk (on loan from Hirnyk-Sport Horishni Plavni)
—	MF	BRA	Araujo (loan return from FC Mynai)
—	MF	UKR	Andriy Busko (from Karpaty Lviv)
—	MF	BRA	Jonatan Lima
—	MF	UKR	Mykyta Khodakovskyi (from Bukovyna Chernivtsi)
—	MF	UKR	Artem Nedolya (from Kremin Kremenchuk)
—	FW	BRA	Matheus Iacovelli (from (Portugal) Estoril)

Out:

No.	Pos.	Nation	Player
—	GK	UKR	Oleksandr Bandura (to Rukh Lviv)
—	DF	UKR	Volodymyr Adamyuk (to SC Dnipro-1)
—	DF	UKR	Mykola Kvasnyi (to Inhulets Petrove)
—	DF	BRA	Vicente (to (Albania) KF Bylis)
—	DF	UKR	Ruslan Zubkov (to Veres Rivne)
—	MF	BRA	Leonardo
—	MF	BRA	Marthã (to (Brazil) Ceará)
—	MF	BRA	Pedro Vitor (on loan to (Finland) Kuopion Palloseura)
—	MF	BRA	Lipe Veloso (on loan to (Belarus) Torpedo-BelAZ Zhodino)
—	FW	BRA	Pernambuco (on loan to (Georgia (country)) Dinamo Tbilisi)

=== Mariupol ===
In:

No.	Pos.	Nation	Player
—	DF	UKR	Nazariy Muravskyi (on loan from Shakhtar Donetsk)
—	DF	UKR	Danylo Sahutkin (on loan from Shakhtar Donetsk)
—	MF	UKR	Danylo Ihnatenko (on loan from Shakhtar Donetsk)
—	FW	UKR	Stanislav Biblyk (on loan from Shakhtar Donetsk)
—	FW	UKR	Artem Dudik (on loan from Shakhtar Donetsk)

Out:

No.	Pos.	Nation	Player
—	GK	UKR	Rustam Khudzhamov (retired)
—	FW	UKR	Vladyslav Vakula (loan return to Shakhtar Donetsk)

=== Oleksandriya ===
In:

No.	Pos.	Nation	Player
—	DF	UKR	Roman Vantukh (on loan from Dynamo Kyiv)
—	MF	UKR	Artem Hordiyenko (from (Moldova) Sheriff Tiraspol)
—	MF	UKR	Bohdan Myshenko (from (Belarus) Torpedo-BelAZ Zhodino)
—	MF	UKR	Dmytro Semenov (loan return from MFC Mykolaiv)

Out:

No.	Pos.	Nation	Player
—	DF	UKR	Maksym Dubenkov
—	DF	UKR	Oleh Sokolov
—	MF	UKR	Kyrylo Dryshlyuk (on loan to (Latvia) Spartaks Jūrmala)
—	MF	UKR	Maksym Kulish
—	MF	UKR	Bohdan Lytvyak
—	MF	UKR	Dmytro Semenov (to (Latvia) FK Jelgava)
—	MF	UKR	Stanislav Vasylenko (to Obolon-Brovar Kyiv)
—	MF	UKR	Andriy Zaporozhan (retired)

=== Olimpik Donetsk ===
In:

No.	Pos.	Nation	Player
—	GK	UKR	Artem Kychak (free agent)
—	DF	UKR	Mykyta Kravchenko (on loan from Dynamo Kyiv)
—	DF	UKR	Dmytro Lytvyn (from Zorya Luhansk)
—	DF	UKR	Orest Lebedenko (on loan from (Spain) CD Lugo)
—	MF	GEO	Temur Chogadze (from (Georgia (country)) Torpedo Kutaisi)
—	MF	UKR	Vitaliy Hoshkoderya (from Chornomorets Odesa)
—	MF	LTU	Daniel Romanovskij (from (Lithuania) Kauno Žalgiris)
—	MF	UKR	Nazar Verbnyi (from Karpaty Lviv)
—	FW	UKR	Denys Balanyuk (free agent)
—	FW	UKR	Maksym Dehtyarov (loan return from Desna Chernihiv)
—	FW	SEN	Matar Dieye (loan return from Karpaty Lviv)

Out:

No.	Pos.	Nation	Player
—	GK	UKR	Herman Penkov (to FC Lviv)
—	DF	UKR	Yehor Klymenchuk (to FC Lviv)
—	DF	UKR	Ivan Trubochkin (to (Georgia (country)) Dinamo Tbilisi)
—	DF	UKR	Roman Vantukh (loan return to Dynamo Kyiv)
—	MF	BRA	Fabinho (to (Latvia) Ventspils)
—	MF	BRA	Luiz Fernando (to Balkany Zorya)
—	MF	UKR	Hennadiy Pasich (to Karpaty Lviv)
—	MF	BFA	Dramane Salou (to (Belarus) FC Slutsk)
—	FW	NGA	Geoffrey Chinedu (on loan to (Estonia) Narva Trans)
—	FW	SEN	Matar Dieye (on loan to Karpaty Lviv)

=== Shakhtar Donetsk ===
In:

No.	Pos.	Nation	Player
—	DF	UKR	Danylo Sahutkin (loan return from (Russia) Yenisey Krasnoyarsk)
—	MF	BRA	Fernando (loan return from (Portugal) Sporting CP)
—	MF	UKR	Danylo Ihnatenko (loan return from (Hungary) Ferencváros)
—	MF	UKR	Klim Prykhodko (loan return from Vorskla Poltava)
—	MF	UKR	Maksym Voytikhovskyi (from Chornomorets Odesa)
—	FW	UKR	Artem Dudik (loan return from (Belarus) Slutsk)
—	FW	UKR	Vladyslav Kulach (loan return from (Hungary) Honvéd)
—	FW	BRA	Wellington Nem (loan return from (Brazil) Fluminense)
—	FW	UKR	Vladyslav Vakula (loan return from FC Mariupol)

Out:

No.	Pos.	Nation	Player
—	DF	UKR	Bohdan Butko (on loan to (Poland) Lech Poznań)
—	DF	UKR	Nazariy Muravskyi (on loan to FC Mariupol)
—	DF	UKR	Danylo Sahutkin (on loan to FC Mariupol)
—	MF	UKR	Danylo Ihnatenko (on loan to FC Mariupol)
—	MF	UKR	Klim Prykhodko (on loan to Vorskla Poltava)
—	MF	UKR	Andriy Totovytskyi (to Desna Chernihiv)
—	FW	UKR	Stanislav Biblyk (on loan to FC Mariupol)
—	FW	UKR	Andriy Boryachuk (on loan to (Turkey) Çaykur Rizespor)
—	FW	UKR	Artem Dudik (on loan to FC Mariupol)
—	FW	UKR	Vladyslav Kulach (to Vorskla Poltava)

=== Vorskla Poltava ===
In:

No.	Pos.	Nation	Player
—	DF	UKR	Taras Dmytruk (from Dynamo Kyiv)
—	DF	UKR	Myroslav Mazur (loan return from (Moldova) Sfântul Gheorghe Suruceni)
—	DF	UKR	Yevhen Opanasenko (from (Turkey) Konyaspor)
—	MF	UKR	Artem Kulakovskyi (from Dynamo Kyiv)
—	MF	UKR	Klim Prykhodko (on loan from Shakhtar Donetsk)
—	MF	CRO	David Puclin (free agent)
—	MF	UKR	Dmytro Shcherbak (free agent)
—	FW	UKR	Vladyslav Kulach (from Shakhtar Donetsk)
—	FW	UKR	Volodymyr Odaryuk (loan return from Hirnyk-Sport)
—	FW	UKR	Ruslan Stepanyuk (from (Kazakhstan) Zhetysu)

Out:

No.	Pos.	Nation	Player
—	DF	BRA	Artur
—	DF	UKR	Myroslav Mazur (to (Sweden) Umeå FC)
—	DF	UKR	Zurab Ochihava (to (Estonia) Levadia Tallinn)
—	DF	UKR	Viktor Pylypenko (to Kremin Kremenchuk)
—	DF	UKR	Taras Sakiv (to Rukh Lviv)
—	MF	UKR	Dmytro Kravchenko
—	MF	BRA	Luizão (loan return to (Portugal) Porto)
—	MF	TAN	Yohana Mkomola (to Inhulets Petrove)
—	MF	BIH	Todor Petrović (to (Croatia) Inter Zaprešić)
—	MF	UKR	Klim Prykhodko (loan return to Shakhtar Donetsk)
—	MF	BIH	Edin Šehić
—	MF	UKR	Andriy Stryzhak (to Chornomorets Odesa)
—	FW	ALB	Rubin Hebaj (to (Albania) Teuta Durrës)
—	FW	UKR	Yuriy Kolomoyets (to (Estonia) Levadia Tallinn)

=== Zorya Luhansk ===
In:

No.	Pos.	Nation	Player
—	DF	UKR	Vladyslav Yemets (loan return from Avanhard Kramatorsk)
—	MF	LVA	Andrejs Cigaņiks (from (Latvia) RFS)
—	MF	CRO	Lovro Cvek (from (Slovakia) Senica)
—	MF	BRA	Silas (loan return from (Israel) Ironi Kiryat Shmona)
—	FW	MNE	Mihailo Perović (from (Montenegro) Budućnost Podgorica)
—	FW	BRA	Rafael Ratão (loan return from (Slovakia) Slovan Bratislava)

Out:

No.	Pos.	Nation	Player
—	GK	BRA	Luiz Felipe (to (Brazil) Aimoré)
—	DF	UKR	Maksym Bilyi (on loan to Rukh Lviv)
—	DF	BRA	Lazio
—	DF	UKR	Dmytro Lytvyn (to Olimpik Donetsk)
—	DF	UKR	Illya Povaliy (to Polissya Zhytomyr)
—	DF	UKR	Vladyslav Yemets (on loan to Kolos Kovalivka)
—	DF	UKR	Tymofiy Sukhar (on loan to Metalurh Zaporizhya)
—	DF	JPN	Itsuki Urata
—	MF	UKR	Levan Arveladze (to Desna Chernihiv)
—	MF	BRA	Mateus Norton
—	MF	BRA	Silas (to (Belarus) Dinamo Minsk)
—	MF	UKR	Yehor Shalfeyev (on loan to Metalurh Zaporizhya)
—	FW	UKR	Pylyp Budkivskyi (to Desna Chernihiv)
—	FW	BRA	Rafael Ratão (to (Slovakia) Slovan Bratislava)
—	FW	UKR	Nazariy Rusyn (loan return to Dynamo Kyiv)

== Ukrainian First League ==
=== Ahrobiznes Volochysk ===
In:

No.	Pos.	Nation	Player
—	GK	UKR	Andriy Artym (on loan from Karpaty Lviv)
—	GK	UKR	Oleh Mozil (from Polissya Zhytomyr)
—	DF	UKR	Yevhen Zakharchenko (from (Armenia) Lokomotiv Yerevan)
—	MF	UKR	Serhiy Kosovskyi (from (Slovakia) Slávia TU Košice)
—	FW	UKR	Dmytro Kozban (from Kremin Kremenchuk)
—	FW	UKR	Serhiy Petrov (from Metalist 1925 Kharkiv)

Out:

No.	Pos.	Nation	Player
—	GK	UKR	Yevhen Panchenko
—	DF	UKR	Nazar Stasyshyn
—	MF	UKR	Mykola Buy
—	MF	UKR	Bohdan Ivanchenko
—	MF	ESP	Fran Monroy (to (Spain) CD Arenteiro)
—	MF	UKR	Dmytro Verhun
—	MF	UKR	Oleksiy Zinkevych (to Chornomorets Odesa)
—	FW	UKR	Ihor Sikorskyi (to Chornomorets Odesa)

=== Avanhard Kramatorsk ===
In:

No.	Pos.	Nation	Player
14	MF	UKR	Denys Dolinskyi (from Nyva Vinnytsia)
—	MF	UKR	Yevhen Troyanovskyi (loan return from Metalurh Zaporizhya)
—	MF	UKR	Eduard Sukhomlyn (free agent)
—	MF	UKR	Oleksandr Tsybulnyk (from Cherkashchyna)
—	FW	UKR	Vladyslav Nekhtiy (from Kolos Kovalivka)
53	DF	NGA	Alma Abbo Wakili (free agent)
02	DF	UKR	Dmytro Sydorenko (from Enerhiya Nova Kakhovka)
70	MF	UKR	Artur Murza (from Volyn Lutsk)
13	DF	UKR	Dmytro Petryk (free agent)

Out:

No.	Pos.	Nation	Player
—	DF	UKR	Oleksandr Aksyonov (to (Lithuania) Banga Gargždai)
—	DF	UKR	Oleh Boroday (to Obolon-Brovar Kyiv)
—	DF	UKR	Vladyslav Yemets (loan return to Zorya Luhansk)
—	MF	UKR	Valeriy Kutsenko (to FC Sumy)
—	MF	UKR	Oleksiy Moyseyenko (to Hirnyk-Sport Horishni Plavni)
—	MF	UKR	Dmytro Ulyanov (to MFC Mykolaiv)
—	MF	UKR	Yevhen Troyanovskyi (to Metalurh Zaporizhya)
—	FW	UKR	Vadym Shavrin (to FC Sumy)
—	FW	UKR	Vadym Yavorskyi (to MFC Mykolaiv)

=== Balkany Zorya ===
In:

No.	Pos.	Nation	Player
—	GK	UKR	Serhiy Lukash (from Real Pharma Odesa)
—	DF	UKR	Roman Nykolyshyn (from FC Kalush)
—	MF	UKR	Andriy Fayuk (from FC Cherkashchyna)
—	MF	BRA	Dodô (from Metalist 1925 Kharkiv)
—	MF	BRA	Lucas (from (Uzbekistan) Surkhon Termez)
—	MF	BRA	Luiz Fernando (from Olimpik Donetsk)
—	MF	UKR	Vladyslav Shukhovtsev (from Chornomorets Odesa)
—	MF	UKR	Vladyslav Sydorenko (from Kremin Kremenchuk)

Out:

No.	Pos.	Nation	Player
—	GK	UKR	Bohdan Lobodrov
—	GK	UKR	Oleksiy Palamarchuk (to Chornomorets Odesa)
—	GK	UKR	Mykyta Zelenskyi (to Inhulets Petrove)
—	DF	UKR	Bohdan Salamakha (retired)
—	DF	UKR	Mykola Zlatov (retired)
—	MF	UKR	Oleksiy Chernyshov
—	MF	UKR	Viktor Heorhiyev (to FC Cherkashchyna)
—	MF	UKR	Vadym Hranchar
—	MF	UKR	Vitaliy Huzenko
—	MF	UKR	Ruslan Palamar (to MFC Mykolaiv)
—	MF	UKR	Yaroslav Zakharevych (to FC Cherkashchyna)
—	FW	UKR	Denys Antyukh (loan return to Kolos Kovalivka)

=== Cherkashchyna Сherkasy ===
In:

No.	Pos.	Nation	Player
—	GK	UKR	Yevhen Stryzh (from Rubikon Vyshneve)
—	GK	UKR	Anatoliy Tymofeyev (free agent)
—	DF	UKR	Andriy Nesterenko (free agent)
—	DF	UKR	Ivan Sklyarenko (from Dzhuniors Shpytky)
—	MF	SEN	Souleymane Diong (from Podillya Khmelnytskyi)
—	MF	UKR	Oleh Dmytrenko (from FC Mynai)
—	MF	UKR	Anton Dolhyi (from Chaika Petropavlivska Borshchahivka)
—	MF	UKR	Viktor Heorhiyev (from Balkany Zorya)
—	MF	UKR	Maksym Hrysyo (from Karpaty Lviv)
—	MF	UKR	Yevhen Morozenko (free agent)
—	MF	UKR	Ihor Nechay (from Dzhuniors Shpytky)
—	MF	UKR	Dmytro Rozhko (from Kolos Kovalivka)
—	MF	UKR	Yaroslav Zakharevych (from Balkany Zorya)
—	FW	UKR	Vladyslav Kabanyuk (free agent)
—	FW	UKR	Bohdan Kovalenko (from Chornomorets Odesa)
—	FW	UKR	Maksym Skrypnyk (from Dzhuniors Shpytky)
—	FW	UKR	Rostyslav Taranukha (from Kremin Kremenchuk)
—	FW	UKR	Artem Tyshchenko (free agent)
—	FW	UKR	Maksym Tyshchenko (from Rubikon Vyshneve)
—	FW	UKR	Kostyantyn Yatsyk (free agent)

Out:

No.	Pos.	Nation	Player
—	GK	UKR	Andriy Lyenchinkov
—	GK	UKR	Oleksiy Mayboroda (to Hirnyk Kryvyi Rih)
—	GK	UKR	Vladyslav Marchenko
—	DF	UKR	Anatoliy Burlin (to LNZ-Lebedyn)
—	DF	UKR	Oleh Domalchuk
—	DF	UKR	Denys Shurubura
—	DF	UKR	Stanislav Strykal
—	DF	UKR	Yevhen Zadorozhnyuk
—	MF	UKR	Maksym Averyanov
—	MF	UKR	Vitaliy Boyko
—	MF	UKR	Vadym Chornyi
—	MF	UKR	Andriy Fayuk (to Balkany Zorya)
—	MF	UKR	Dmytro Koshelyuk (to FC Sumy)
—	MF	UKR	Oleksandr Medvyed (to FC Kalush)
—	MF	UKR	Stanislav Nikishov
—	MF	UKR	Vyacheslav Orel
—	MF	UKR	Oleksiy Perederiy
—	MF	UKR	Andriy Storchous
—	MF	UKR	Mykhailo Tsebro
—	MF	UKR	Oleksandr Tsybulnyk (to Avanhard Kramatorsk)
—	MF	UKR	Ivan Tyshchenko (to VPK-Ahro Shevchenkivka)
—	FW	UKR	Ivan Antonyuk
—	FW	UKR	Yuriy Malyei (to MFC Mykolaiv)
—	FW	UKR	Vadym Tenzhytskyi (to Enerhiya Nova Kakhovka)
—	FW	UKR	Kyrylo Tsokalo
—	FW	UKR	Maksym Zelenevych (to (Slovakia) SK Nesvady)

=== Chornomorets Odesa ===
In:

No.	Pos.	Nation	Player
—	GK	UKR	Bohdan Kurilko (from Krystal Kherson)
—	GK	UKR	Vitaliy Myrnyi (from (Uzbekistan) Andijon)
—	GK	UKR	Oleksiy Palamarchuk (from Balkany Zorya)
—	DF	UKR	Mykhaylo Kaluhin (from (Belarus) Dnyapro Mogilev)
—	DF	UKR	Viktor Lykhovydko (from Hirnyk-Sport Horishni Plavni)
—	DF	UKR	Stanislav Mykytsey (from (Latvia) Jelgava)
—	DF	UKR	Oleh Ostapenko (from Nyva Vinnytsia)
—	DF	UKR	Andriy Slinkin (from MFC Mykolaiv)
—	DF	UKR	Yevhen Zubeyko (from (Belarus) Minsk)
—	MF	UKR	Artur Avahimyan (from (Armenia) Alashkert)
—	MF	UKR	Stanislav Ivanik (free agent)
—	MF	UKR	Vladyslav Klymenko (from Inhulets Petrove)
—	MF	UKR	Roman Popov (from MFC Mykolaiv)
—	MF	UKR	Kyrylo Silich (from (Lithuania) DFK Dainava)
—	MF	UKR	Andriy Stryzhak (from Vorskla Poltava)
—	MF	UKR	Denys Yanakov (on loan from Dynamo Kyiv)
—	MF	UKR	Oleksiy Zinkevych (from Ahrobiznes Volochysk)
—	FW	UKR	Ihor Sikorskyi (from Ahrobiznes Volochysk)
—	FW	UKR	Roman Yalovenko (from Avanhard Bziv)

Out:

No.	Pos.	Nation	Player
—	GK	UKR	Andriy Kozhukhar (to (Latvia) Valmieras)
—	DF	UKR	Oleksandr Holikov (to Obolon-Brovar Kyiv)
—	DF	UKR	Hlib Hrachov
—	DF	UKR	Oleh Ostapenko (to Nyva Vinnytsia)
—	DF	UKR	Dmytro Ryzhuk (to (Belarus) FC Minsk)
—	DF	UKR	Denys Vasilyev (to (Uzbekistan) Mash'al Mubarek)
—	DF	UKR	Serhiy Voronin
—	MF	UKR	Volodymyr Arzhanov
—	MF	UKR	Vitaliy Hoshkoderya (to Olimpik Donetsk)
—	MF	UKR	Mykola Musolitin (to (Latvia) Valmieras)
—	MF	UKR	Denys Norenkov (to Volyn Lutsk)
—	MF	UKR	Vladyslav Shukhovtsev (to Balkany Zorya)
—	MF	UKR	Volodymyr Tanchyk (to Karpaty Lviv)
—	MF	UKR	Andriy Tkachuk (to FC Mynai)
—	MF	UKR	Maksym Voytikhovskyi (to Shakhtar Donetsk)
—	MF	UKR	Kostyantyn Yaroshenko (to Alians Lypova Dolyna)
—	MF	UKR	Oleksiy Zinkevych
—	FW	UKR	Bohdan Kovalenko (to FC Cherkashchyna)
—	FW	UKR	Oleksandr Kovpak (to Polissya Zhytomyr)
—	FW	UKR	Dmytro Semeniv (to (Latvia) Liepāja)
—	GK	UKR	Dmytro Bezotosnyi
—	FW	RUS	Vasili Pavlov
—	FW	UKR	Mykhaylo Plokhotnyuk (to Inhulets Petrove)

=== Hirnyk-Sport Horishni Plavni ===
In:

No.	Pos.	Nation	Player
—	DF	UKR	Semen Dyachenko (from Metalurh Zaporizhya)
—	DF	UKR	Danylo Karas (free agent)
—	DF	UKR	Illya Malyshkin (from Kolos Kovalivka)
—	DF	UKR	Bohdan Veklyak (from Karpaty Lviv)
—	MF	UKR	Illya Cherednychenko (free agent)
—	MF	UKR	Oleksiy Moyseyenko (from Avanhard Kramatorsk)
—	MF	UKR	Andriy Sorokin (from (Belarus) Slavia Mozyr)
—	MF	UKR	Yehor Tverdokhlib (from Atlet Kyiv)
—	FW	UKR	Oleksiy Boyko (from (Armenia) Lokomotiv Yerevan)

Out:

No.	Pos.	Nation	Player
—	GK	UKR	Ihor Koval
—	DF	UKR	Bohdan Bychkov (to Kremin Kremenchuk)
—	DF	UKR	Andriy Derkach
—	DF	UKR	Oleksandr Holovko (to Kremin Kremenchuk)
—	DF	UKR	Yuriy Kravchuk (on loan to FC Lviv)
—	DF	UKR	Viktor Lykhovydko (to Chornomorets Odesa)
—	DF	UKR	Vadym Shyrokostup
—	MF	UKR	Serhiy Bilous (to Kremin Kremenchuk)
—	MF	UKR	Denys Chernysh (to Kremin Kremenchuk)
—	MF	UKR	Anton Kotlyar
—	MF	UKR	Andriy Ralyuchenko
—	FW	UKR	Artem Khotsyanovskyi (to Veres Rivne)
—	FW	UKR	Artem Kozlov (loan return to Inhulets Petrove)
—	FW	UKR	Volodymyr Odaryuk (loan return to Vorskla Poltava)

=== Inhulets Petrove ===
In:

No.	Pos.	Nation	Player
—	GK	UKR	Mykyta Zelenskyi (from Balkany Zorya)
—	DF	UKR	Mykola Kvasnyi (from Lviv)
—	DF	UKR	Andriy Semenko (from Obolon-Brovar Kyiv)
—	DF	UKR	Volodymyr Senytsya (from FC Kalush)
—	MF	CRO	Mladen Bartulović (from Volyn Lutsk)
—	MF	UKR	Artem Chorniy (free agent)
—	MF	TAN	Yohana Mkomola (from Vorskla Poltava)
—	MF	UKR	Ihor Zahalskyi (from SC Dnipro-1)
—	FW	UKR	Artem Kozlov (loan return from Hirnyk-Sport Horishni Plavni)
—	FW	UKR	Mykhaylo Plokhotnyuk (from Chornomorets Odesa)

Out:

No.	Pos.	Nation	Player
—	DF	UKR	Mykhaylo Pysko (to (Belarus) Belshina Bobruisk)
—	MF	UKR	Artem Chorniy
—	MF	CMR	Armand Ken Ella (to (Uzbekistan) Mash'al Mubarek)
—	MF	UKR	Vladyslav Klymenko (to Chornomorets Odesa)
—	MF	UKR	Oleh Marchuk (to Kremin Kremenchuk)
—	MF	UKR	Stanislav Peredystyi
—	FW	UKR	Oleksandr Akymenko
—	FW	UKR	Vadym Loboda (to Kremin Kremenchuk)
—	FW	UKR	Artem Kozlov (to Kremin Kremenchuk)
—	FW	UKR	Dmytro Sula (to Kremin Kremenchuk)

=== Kremin Kremenchuk ===
In:

No.	Pos.	Nation	Player
—	GK	UKR	Dmytro Fastov (from Obolon-Brovar Kyiv)
—	DF	UKR	Ihor Alantyev
—	DF	UKR	Ernest Astakhov
—	DF	UKR	Bohdan Bychkov (from Hirnyk-Sport Horishni Plavni)
—	DF	UKR	Artem Dmytriyev (from Enerhiya Nova Kakhovka)
—	DF	UKR	Oleksandr Holovko (from Hirnyk-Sport Horishni Plavni)
—	DF	UKR	Anatoliy Klyus (from Atrium Pavlohrad)
—	DF	UKR	Valeriy Kureliekh (free agent)
—	DF	UKR	Viktor Pylypenko (from Vorskla Poltava)
—	DF	UKR	Yehor Smirnov (from VPK-Ahro Shevchenkivka)
—	MF	UKR	Artem Baftalovskyi (from Enerhiya Nova Kakhovka)
—	MF	UKR	Serhiy Bilous (from Hirnyk-Sport Horishni Plavni)
—	MF	UKR	Denys Chernysh (from Hirnyk-Sport Horishni Plavni)
—	MF	UKR	Vladyslav Danylenko
—	MF	UKR	Dzhaba Fkhakadze
—	MF	UKR	Artem Kozlov (from Inhulets Petrove)
—	MF	UKR	Oleh Marchuk (from Inhulets Petrove)
—	MF	UKR	Ivan Yanakov (free agent)
—	FW	UKR	Oleh Barannik (free agent)
—	FW	UKR	Vadym Loboda (from Inhulets Petrove)
—	FW	UKR	Dmytro Sula (from Inhulets Petrove)

Out:

No.	Pos.	Nation	Player
—	GK	UKR	Orest Budyuk (to (Moldova) Speranța Nisporeni)
—	DF	UKR	Ernest Astakhov (to (Belarus) Torpedo-BelAZ Zhodino)
—	DF	UKR	Roman Honcharenko (to Veres Rivne)
—	DF	UKR	Yehor Smirnov
—	DF	UKR	Dmytro Zozulya (to (Uzbekistan) Andijon)
—	MF	UKR	Serhiy Chenbay (to Metalist 1925 Kharkiv)
—	MF	UKR	Vladyslav Danylenko
—	MF	UKR	Andriy Hretsaychuk
—	MF	UKR	Ihor Koshman
—	MF	UKR	Anatoliy Masalov (to Tavriya Simferopol)
—	MF	UKR	Vladyslav Molko
—	MF	UKR	Artem Nedolya (to FC Lviv)
—	MF	UKR	Yuriy Pavlyk (to (Lithuania) Banga Gargždai)
—	MF	UKR	Dmytro Skoblov (to Metalurh Zaporizhya)
—	MF	UKR	Vladyslav Sydorenko (to Balkany Zorya)
—	MF	UKR	Rostyslav Taranukha (to FC Cherkashchyna)
—	MF	UKR	Vadym Voronchenko (to Tavriya Simferopol)
—	MF	UKR	Oleksandr Yermachenko (to (Moldova) Speranța Nisporeni)
—	FW	UKR	Oleh Barannik
—	FW	UKR	Dmytro Kozban (to Ahrobiznes Volochysk)
—	FW	UKR	Ivan Kuts
—	FW	UKR	Mykhaylo Udod (to (Kyrgyzstan) Kaganat)

=== Metalist 1925 Kharkiv ===
In:

No.	Pos.	Nation	Player
—	DF	UKR	Serhiy Chenbay (from Kremin Kremenchuk)
—	MF	UKR	Maksym Banasevych (from Rukh Lviv)
—	FW	UKR	Robert Hehedosh (from FC Mynai)

Out:

No.	Pos.	Nation	Player
—	GK	UKR	Vladyslav Fedak
—	DF	UKR	Vladyslav Kravchenko (to Metalurh Zaporizhya)
—	DF	UKR	Oleksandr Zhdanov (to Podillya Khmelnytskyi)
—	MF	BRA	Dodô (to Balkany Zorya)
—	FW	UKR	Robert Hehedosh
—	FW	UKR	Serhiy Petrov (to Ahrobiznes Volochysk)
—	FW	UKR	Maksym Pryadun (to (Armenia) Lokomotiv Yerevan)

=== Metalurh Zaporizhya ===
In:

No.	Pos.	Nation	Player
—	GK	UKR	Yaroslav Kotlyarov (from Volyn Lutsk)
—	DF	UKR	Vladyslav Bobrov (from (Moldova) Codru Lozova)
—	DF	UKR	Vladyslav Kravchenko (from Metalist 1925 Kharkiv)
—	DF	UKR	Tymofiy Sukhar (on loan from Zorya Luhansk)
—	MF	UKR	Yehor Shalfeyev (on loan from Zorya Luhansk)
—	MF	UKR	Dmytro Skoblov (from Kremin Kremenchuk)
—	MF	UKR	Yevhen Troyanovskyi (from Avanhard Kramatorsk)
—	FW	UKR	Yaroslav Dovhyi (free agent)

Out:

No.	Pos.	Nation	Player
—	GK	UKR	Ihor Levchenko
—	DF	UKR	Valentyn Rudych
—	MF	UKR	Semen Dyachenko (to Hirnyk-Sport Horishni Plavni)
—	MF	UKR	Taras Kovalchuk
—	MF	UKR	Serhiy Rudyka
—	MF	UKR	Yevhen Troyanovskyi (loan return to Avanhard Kramatorsk)
—	FW	UKR	Vadym Petrov

=== MFC Mykolaiv ===
In:

No.	Pos.	Nation	Player
—	GK	UKR	Denys Shelikhov (free agent)
—	DF	UKR	Vladyslav Okhronchuk (from Kolos Kovalivka)
—	DF	UKR	Temur Partsvania (free agent)
—	DF	UKR	Dmytro Ulyanov (from Avanhard Kramatorsk)
—	MF	UKR	Yuriy Malyei (from FC Cherkashchyna)
—	MF	UKR	Ruslan Palamar (to Balkany Zorya)
—	FW	UKR	Yuriy Cherepushchak (from Girnyk Novoyavorivsk)
—	FW	UKR	Vadym Yavorskyi (from Avanhard Kramatorsk)

Out:

No.	Pos.	Nation	Player
—	GK	UKR	Mykyta Kryukov (to (Autonomous Republic of Crimea) Rubin Yalta)
—	GK	UKR	Denys Starchenko (to Krystal Kherson)
—	DF	UKR	Maksym Bilyk (to VPK-Ahro Shevchenkivka)
—	DF	UKR	Oleksandr Horvat (to Hirnyk Kryvyi Rih)
—	DF	UKR	Volodymyr Kirychuk (to (Latvia) Jelgava)
—	DF	UKR	Valeriy Rohozynskyi (to Alians Lypova Dolyna)
—	DF	UKR	Dmytro Sartina (to FC Uzhhorod)
—	DF	UKR	Dmytro Semenov (loan return to FC Oleksandriya)
—	DF	UKR	Andriy Slinkin (to Chornomorets Odesa)
—	MF	UKR	Serhiy Panasenko (to Veres Rivne)
—	MF	UKR	Roman Popov (to Chornomorets Odesa)
—	MF	UKR	Ihor Semenyna (to Krystal Kherson)
—	MF	UKR	Ivan Sondey (to Prykarpattia Ivano-Frankivsk)
—	FW	UKR	Viktor Berko (to Hirnyk Kryvyi Rih)

=== FC Mynai ===
In:

No.	Pos.	Nation	Player
—	GK	UKR	Vladyslav Sydorenko (from Krystal Kherson)
—	DF	UKR	Roman Nykytyuk (from Rukh Lviv)
—	DF	UKR	Vasyl Lutsiv
—	MF	UKR	Oleh Holodyuk (free agent)
—	MF	UKR	Danylo Knysh (from FC Kalush)
—	MF	UKR	Petro Lutsiv
—	MF	UKR	Bohdan Orynchak (on loan from Rukh Lviv)
—	MF	UKR	Oleksiy Shpak (loan return from Podillya Khmelnytskyi)
—	MF	UKR	Andriy Tkachuk (from Chornomorets Odesa)
—	MF	UKR	Serhiy Mashtalir (from FC Uzhhorod)
—	FW	UKR	Rustam Akhmedzade ((on loan?) from FC Kolos Kovalivka)

Out:

No.	Pos.	Nation	Player
—	GK	UKR	Artem Kulinich
—	DF	UKR	Vasyl Betsa
—	DF	UKR	Orkhan Ibadov
—	DF	BRA	Antonio Santos (loan return to (Slovakia) Lokomotíva Košice)
—	MF	BRA	Araújo (loan return to FC Lviv)
—	MF	UKR	Oleh Dmytrenko (to FC Cherkashchyna)
—	MF	UKR	Maksym Havrylenko
—	MF	UKR	Anton Kicha
—	MF	UKR	Yaromyr Loboda
—	MF	UKR	Yevhen Rusyn
—	MF	UKR	Oleksiy Shpak (on loan to Podillya Khmelnytskyi)
—	MF	UKR	Vadym Strashkevych
—	FW	UKR	Robert Hehedosh (to Metalist 1925 Kharkiv)
—	FW	UKR	Ivan Kapustey
—	FW	UKR	Oleh Mayik

=== Obolon-Brovar Kyiv ===
In:

No.	Pos.	Nation	Player
—	GK	UKR	Dmytro Fastov
—	DF	UKR	Vasyl Bilyi (from Nyva Ternopil)
—	DF	UKR	Oleh Boroday (from Avanhard Kramatorsk)
—	DF	UKR	Oleksandr Holikov (from Chornomorets Odesa)
—	MF	UKR	Stanislav Vasylenko (from FC Oleksandriya)
—	FW	UKR	Vladyslav Ryabtsev

Out:

No.	Pos.	Nation	Player
—	GK	UKR	Yevhen Borovyk (retired)
—	GK	UKR	Dmytro Fastov (to Kremin Kremenchuk)
—	DF	UKR	Andriy Semenko (to Inhulets Petrove)
—	DF	UKR	Valeriy Stepanenko (to (Moldova) Sfântul Gheorghe Suruceni)
—	DF	UKR	Yevhen Yefremov (to Kolos Kovalivka)
—	MF	UKR	Denys Ostrovskyi
—	MF	UKR	Stanislav Vasylenko
—	FW	UKR	Oleksandr Derebchynskyi
—	FW	UKR	Taras Puchkovskyi (to FC Kalush)

=== Prykarpattia Ivano-Frankivsk ===
In:

No.	Pos.	Nation	Player
—	DF	UKR	Volodymyr Korzhak
—	DF	UKR	Svyatoslav Lavruk (from FC Kalush)
—	DF	UKR	Mykola Sikach
—	DF	UKR	Andriy Vasyliv
—	MF	UKR	Oleh Pavlyuk
—	MF	UKR	Ivan Sondey (from MFC Mykolaiv)
—	MF	UKR	Andriy Vatseba
—	MF	UKR	Nazariy Vorobchak

Out:

No.	Pos.	Nation	Player
—	GK	UKR	Vasyl Stefyuk
—	DF	UKR	Viktor Danyshchuk
—	DF	UKR	Yaroslav Konkolnyak (to Volyn Lutsk)
—	DF	UKR	Petro Kovalchuk
—	DF	UKR	Viktor Yanevych
—	MF	UKR	Volodymyr Boryshkevych
—	MF	UKR	Bohdan Orynchak (to Rukh Lviv)
—	MF	UKR	Oleksandr Soldatenko
—	FW	UKR	Ihor Khudobyak

=== Rukh Lviv ===
In:

No.	Pos.	Nation	Player
—	GK	UKR	Oleksandr Bandura (from FC Lviv)
—	DF	UKR	Maksym Bilyi (on loan from Zorya Luhansk)
—	DF	UKR	Taras Sakiv (from Vorskla Poltava)
—	MF	GEO	Rati Ardazishvili (from (Georgia (country)) Locomotive Tbilisi)
—	MF	BRA	Gabriel (loan return from FC Kalush)
—	MF	UKR	Maryan Mysyk (loan return from Veres Rivne)
—	MF	UKR	Bohdan Orynchak (from Prykarpattia Ivano-Frankivsk)
—	MF	UKR	Yuriy Romanyuk (from SC Dnipro-1)
—	FW	UKR	Stanislav Bilenkyi (on loan from (Slovakia) Dunajská Streda)
—	FW	UKR	Svyatoslav Kozlovskyi (free agent)
—	FW	UKR	Mykola Kukharevych (from Volyn Lutsk)

Out:

No.	Pos.	Nation	Player
—	DF	BRA	Leandro da Silva
—	DF	BRA	Sidney (on loan to (Armenia) Ararat Yerevan)
—	DF	UKR	Dmytro Nyemchaninov (to (Slovakia) Nitra)
—	DF	UKR	Roman Nykytyuk (to FC Mynai)
—	MF	UKR	Maksym Banasevych (to Metalist 1925 Kharkiv)
—	MF	UKR	Maksym Kalenchuk (to (Belarus) FC Vitebsk)
—	MF	UKR	Andriy Lyashenko (to (Kyrgyzstan) Kaganat)
—	MF	UKR	Bohdan Orynchak (on loan to FC Mynai)

=== Volyn Lutsk ===
In:

No.	Pos.	Nation	Player
—	GK	UKR	Serhiy Litovchenko (from (Georgia (country)) Dinamo Tbilisi)
—	DF	UKR	Yaroslav Konkolnyak (from Prykarpattia Ivano-Frankivsk)
—	DF	UKR	Vitaliy Pryndeta (from Desna Chernihiv)
—	MF	UKR	Dzhemal Kyzylatesh (from Kolos Kovalivka)
—	MF	UKR	Denys Norenkov (from Chornomorets Odesa)
—	MF	UKR	Valeriy Sad (from Veres Rivne)
—	FW	UKR	Stanislav Kulish (from SC Dnipro-1)

Out:

No.	Pos.	Nation	Player
—	GK	UKR	Yaroslav Kotlyarov (to Metalurh Zaporizhya)
—	DF	SVN	Miha Goropevšek (to (Belarus) Dinamo Minsk)
—	DF	UKR	Nazar Melnychuk (to (Poland) Motor Lublin)
—	DF	UKR	Yevhen Neplyakh
—	DF	UKR	Andriy Zin
—	MF	CRO	Mladen Bartulović (to Inhulets Petrove)
—	MF	UKR	Nazariy Bohomaz (to SC Dnipro-1)
—	MF	UKR	Ivan Holovkin
—	MF	UKR	Artur Murza
—	MF	UKR	Andriy Stryzheus
—	MF	UKR	Illya Telikhovskyi
—	FW	UKR	Mykola Kukharevych (to Rukh Lviv)
—	FW	UKR	Vitaliy Ponomar (to (Georgia (country)) Torpedo Kutaisi)

== See also ==
- Summer 2019 transfers
