= List of Ukrainian football transfers winter 2024–25 =

This is a list of Ukrainian football transfers winter 2024–25

== Ukrainian Premier League ==
=== Chornomorets Odesa ===
In:

No.	Pos.	Nation	Player
—	DF	UKR	Magomed Kratov (from Lokomotyv Kyiv)
—	DF	UKR	Yaroslav Rakitskyi (free agent)
—	MF	UKR	Ihor Kohut (on loan from Metalist 1925 Kharkiv)
—	MF	AZE	Emil Mustafayev (on loan from Polissya Zhytomyr)
—	MF	UKR	Bogdan Panchyshyn (on loan from Polissya-2 Zhytomyr)
—	MF	GEO	Giorgi Robakidze (from (Georgia (country)) WIT Georgia)
—	MF	BRA	Ryan (on loan from (Brazil) Bahia)
—	MF	TJK	Khusrav Toirov (on loan from Shakhtar Donetsk)
—	FW	UKR	Denys Bezborodko (from Kolos Kovalivka)

Out:

No.	Pos.	Nation	Player
—	DF	UKR	Borys Lototskyi (Released)
—	MF	UKR	Ivan Petryak (End of loan Shakhtar Donetsk)
—	MF	UKR	Oleksandr Vasylyev (to Bukovyna Chernivtsi)

=== Dynamo Kyiv ===
In:

No.	Pos.	Nation	Player
—	MF	UKR	Valeriy Luchkevych (from Kolos Kovalivka)
—	MF	UKR	Serhiy Buletsa (loan return from (Poland) Lechia Gdańsk)
—	MF	COL	Ángel Torres (free agent)
—	FW	LUX	Gerson Rodrigues (loan return from (China) Guangxi Pingguo)
—	FW	BRA	Vitinho (loan return from (Brazil) Red Bull Bragantino)

Out:

No.	Pos.	Nation	Player
—	GK	UKR	Heorhiy Bushchan (to (Saudi Arabia) Al Shabab)
—	DF	COL	Brayan Ceballos (loan return to (Brazil) Fortaleza)
—	MF	UKR	Oleksandr Andriyevskyi (to Polissya Zhytomyr)
—	MF	UKR	Serhiy Buletsa (to FC Oleksandriya)
—	MF	UKR	Oleksiy Husyev (on loan to Metalist 1925 Kharkiv)
—	MF	UKR	Navin Malysh (on loan to Vorskla Poltava)
—	MF	UKR	Volodymyr Shepelyev (to Oleksandriya)
—	MF	UKR	Oleksandr Shevchenko (Loan to Vorskla Poltava)
—	MF	UKR	Anton Bol (to Oleksandriya)
—	FW	LUX	Gerson Rodrigues (on loan to (Portugal) AVS)
—	FW	BRA	Vitinho (on loan to (Brazil) Internacional)

=== Karpaty Lviv ===
In:

No.	Pos.	Nation	Player
—	DF	UKR	Tymur Stetskov (from Kryvbas Kryvyi Rih)
—	MF	UKR	Oleh Fedor (on loan from Rukh Lviv)
—	MF	UKR	Ihor Krasnopir (loan from Rukh Lviv)
—	MF	UKR	Kyrylo Matvyeyev (loan return from Kudrivka)
—	MF	UKR	Oleksiy Sych (on loan from Rukh Lviv)
—	MF	ARG	Patricio Tanda (on loan from (Argentina) Racing Club)
—	FW	UKR	Illya Kvasnytsya (on loan from Rukh Lviv)
—	FW	BRA	Fabiano (from (Brazil) Botafogo)
—	FW	BRA	Waldemir (from (Brazil) Botafogo)

Out:

No.	Pos.	Nation	Player
—	DF	UKR	Tymofiy Sukhar (to Kolos Kovalivka)
—	MF	UKR	Yehor Kartushov (to Chernihiv)
—	MF	UKR	Artur Ryabov (Released)
—	MF	UKR	Yuriy Tlumak (Released)
—	MF	UKR	Denys Ustymenko (loan return to Kryvbas Kryvyi Rih)

=== Kolos Kovalivka ===
In:

No.	Pos.	Nation	Player
—	DF	UKR	Tymofiy Sukhar (from Karpaty Lviv)
—	DF	ROU	Ștefan Vlădoiu (from (Romania) Universitatea Craiova)
—	MF	BRA	Elias Miguel (from (Slovenia) Primorje)
—	MF	ALB	Arinaldo Rrapaj (from (Albania) Partizani Tirana)
—	FW	UKR	Mykola Kovtalyuk (from Vorskla Poltava)
—	FW	UKR	Oleksiy Sydorov (on loan from Metalist 1925 Kharkiv)

Out:

No.	Pos.	Nation	Player
—	DF	MDA	Cătălin Cucoș (on loan to (Poland) Kotwica Kołobrzeg)
—	MF	UKR	Oleh Ilyin (on loan to Obolon Kyiv)
—	MF	UKR	Ihor Kharatin (to Veres Rivne)
—	MF	UKR	Valeriy Luchkevych (to Dynamo Kyiv)
—	MF	UKR	Anton Salabay (on loan to Vorskla Poltava)
—	FW	UKR	Denys Bezborodko (to Chornomorets Odesa)
—	FW	BRA	Diego Carioca (to (Iran) Chadormalou Ardakan)
—	FW	LTU	Gytis Paulauskas (on loan to (Georgia (country)) Dinamo Batumi)

=== Kryvbas Kryvyi Rih ===
In:

No.	Pos.	Nation	Player
30	MF	NGA	Clement Ikenna (on loan from (Bulgaria) Levski Sofia)
—	MF	CRO	Jan Jurčec (free agent)
—	MF	VEN	Mayken González (on loan from (Venezuela) Deportivo La Guaira)
—	MF	VEN	Gleiker Mendoza (from (Venezuela) Angostura)
—	MF	UKR	Denys Ustymenko (loan return from Karpaty Lviv)
—	FW	UKR	Vladyslav Semotyuk (loan return from Rukh Lviv)

Out:

No.	Pos.	Nation	Player
—	DF	UKR	Tymur Stetskov (to Karpaty Lviv)
—	MF	RWA	Djihad Bizimana (to (Libya) Al Ahli Tripoli)
—	MF	UKR	Oleksandr Drambayev (to LNZ Cherkasy)
—	MF	UKR	Oleh Kozhushko (to Bukovyna Chernivtsi)
—	MF	UKR	Denys Ustymenko (to Obolon Kyiv)
—	FW	CIV	Jean Morel Poé (to (Greece) Iraklis)
—	FW	UKR	Nazar Popov (on loan to Inhulets Petrove)
—	FW	UKR	Vladyslav Semotyuk

=== Inhulets Petrove ===
In:

No.	Pos.	Nation	Player
—	FW	UKR	Nazar Popov (on loan from Kryvbas Kryvyi Rih)

Out:

No.	Pos.	Nation	Player
—	DF	UKR	Maksym Melnychuk (Reliased)
—	MF	UKR	Volodymyr Bilotserkovets (to Zorya Luhansk)
—	MF	UKR	Yuriy Kozyrenko (Reliased)
—	MF	UKR	Maryan Mysyk (to Nyva Ternopil)
—	MF	UKR	Serhiy Petko (Reliased)
—	FW	UKR	Oleksandr Kozak (Reliased)

=== Livyi Bereh Kyiv ===
In:

No.	Pos.	Nation	Player
—	GK	UKR	Illya Karavashchenko (from FSC Mariupol)
—	MF	UKR	Andriy Riznyk (from Nyva Ternopil)
—	FW	UKR	Dmytro Shastal (from Polissya-2 Zhytomyr)

Out:

No.	Pos.	Nation	Player
—	GK	UKR	Vitaliy Chebotaryov (to UCSA Tarasivka)
—	GK	UKR	Dmytro Fastov (to Podillia Khmelnytskyi)
—	DF	UKR	Oleksandr Dudarenko (Kulykiv-Bilka)
—	MF	UKR	Andriy Spivakov (Released)
—	FW	UKR	Ruslan Nepeypiyev (Loan return to Rukh Lviv)

=== LNZ Cherkasy ===
In:

No.	Pos.	Nation	Player
—	DF	UKR	Bohdan Kushnirenko (from Polissya Zhytomyr)
—	MF	UKR	Oleksandr Drambayev (from Kryvbas Kryvyi Rih)
—	MF	UKR	Vyacheslav Tankovskyi (from Polissya Zhytomyr)
—	FW	CRC	Jewison Bennette (from (England) Sunderland)
—	FW	CGO	Béni Makouana (on loan from Polissya Zhytomyr)

Out:

No.	Pos.	Nation	Player
—	MF	MKD	Matej Angelov (loan return to (North Macedonia) Rabotnichki)
—	MF	UKR	Denys Oliynyk (retired)
—	MF	ISR	Osama Khalaila

=== Obolon Kyiv ===
In:

No.	Pos.	Nation	Player
—	MF	UKR	Oleh Ilyin (on loan from Kolos Kovalivka)
—	MF	UKR	Yehor Knyazyev (from Shakhtar Donetsk)
—	MF	UKR	Denys Ustymenko (from Kryvbas Kryvyi Rih)

Out:

No.	Pos.	Nation	Player
—	DF	UKR	Pavlo Lukyanchuk (to UCSA Tarasivka)

=== Oleksandriya ===
In:

No.	Pos.	Nation	Player
—	MF	UKR	Serhiy Buletsa (from Dynamo Kyiv)
—	MF	FRA	Théo Ndicka (from (Switzerland) Grasshopper)
—	MF	UKR	Volodymyr Shepelyev (from Dynamo Kyiv)
—	MF	UKR	Anton Bol (from Dynamo Kyiv)
—	FW	ALB	Tedi Cara (from (Albania) Partizani Tirana)

Out:

No.	Pos.	Nation	Player
—	MF	UKR	Denys Kostyshyn (Released)
—	MF	UKR	Rodion Plaksa (to Bukovyna Chernivtsi)

=== Polissya Zhytomyr ===
In:

No.	Pos.	Nation	Player
—	MF	UKR	Oleksandr Andriyevskyi (from Dynamo Kyiv)
—	MF	ISR	Ofek Bitton (from (Israel) Hapoel Jerusalem)
—	MF	ALB	Andi Hadroj (from (Albania) Partizani Tirana)
—	MF	ISR	Tomer Yosefi (from (Israel) Hapoel Be'er Sheva)
—	FW	URU	Facundo Batista (from (Mexico) Necaxa)
—	FW	POR	André Gonçalves (from (Portugal) Estoril)

Out:

No.	Pos.	Nation	Player
—	DF	UKR	Bohdan Kushnirenko (to LNZ Cherkasy)
—	DF	UKR	Artem Smolyakov (to (United States) Los Angeles FC)
—	MF	AZE	Emil Mustafayev (on loan to Chornomorets Odesa)
—	MF	UKR	Mykhaylo Rasko (on loan to FC Mynai)
—	MF	UKR	Vyacheslav Tankovskyi (to LNZ Cherkasy)
—	MF	MKD	Dimitar Traykov (Loan to (Croatia) Dugopolje)
—	FW	CGO	Béni Makouana (on loan to LNZ Cherkasy)
—	FW	UKR	Daniels Radzenieks (loan to Polissya-2 Zhytomyr)
—	FW	BRA	Wendell (on loan to Veres Rivne)

=== Rukh Lviv ===
In:

No.	Pos.	Nation	Player
—	DF	UGA	Ibrahim Juma (from (Uganda) KCCA FC)
—	MF	UKR	Oleh Horin (free agent)
—	MF	UKR	Artur Remenyak (from Mynai)
—	MF	UKR	Artur Ryabov (from Karpaty Lviv)
—	MF	UKR	Andriy Stolyarchuk (loan return from Podillya Khmelnytskyi)
—	MF	UKR	Yuriy Tlumak (from Karpaty Lviv)
—	FW	KGZ	Beknaz Almazbekov (from (Kosovo) Llapi)
—	FW	GAM	Baboucarr Faal (from (Croatia) Orijent)
—	FW	UKR	Ruslan Nepeypiyev (loan return from Livyi Bereh Kyiv)

Out:

No.	Pos.	Nation	Player
—	MF	UKR	Oleh Fedor (on loan to Karpaty Lviv)
—	MF	UKR	Ihor Krasnopir (on loan to Karpaty Lviv)
—	MF	GLP	Ange-Freddy Plumain (to (Cyprus) Nea Salamina)
—	MF	UKR	Andriy Stolyarchuk
—	MF	UKR	Oleksiy Sych (on loan to Karpaty Lviv)
—	FW	UKR	Illya Kvasnytsya (on loan to Karpaty Lviv)
—	FW	UKR	Ruslan Nepeypiyev
—	FW	UKR	Vladyslav Semotyuk (loan return to Kryvbas Kryvyi Rih)

=== Shakhtar Donetsk ===
In:

No.	Pos.	Nation	Player
—	DF	BOL	Diego Arroyo (from (Bolivia) Club Bolívar)
—	MF	BRA	Alisson (from (Brazil) Atlético Mineiro)
—	MF	UKR	Ivan Petryak (loan return from Chornomorets Odesa)
—	MF	TJK	Khusrav Toirov (loan return from (Kazakhstan) FC Atyrau)
—	FW	BRA	Kauã Elias (from (Brazil) Fluminense)
—	FW	VEN	Kevin Kelsy (loan return from (United States) FC Cincinnati)

Out:

No.	Pos.	Nation	Player
—	DF	CRO	Bartol Franjić (loan return to (Germany) VfL Wolfsburg)
—	MF	UKR	Yehor Knyazyev (to Obolon Kyiv)
—	MF	UKR	Taras Stepanenko (to (Turkey) Eyüpspor)
—	MF	TJK	Khusrav Toirov (on loan to Chornomorets Odesa)
—	MF	UKR	Oleksandr Zubkov (to (Turkey) Trabzonspor)
—	FW	VEN	Kevin Kelsy (to (United States) Portland Timbers)
—	FW	UKR	Danylo Sikan (to (Turkey) Trabzonspor)

=== Veres Rivne ===
In:

No.	Pos.	Nation	Player
—	MF	UKR	Ihor Kharatin (from Kolos Kovalivka)
—	FW	BRA	Wendell (on loan from Polissya Zhytomyr)

Out:

No.	Pos.	Nation	Player
—	GK	UKR	Vadym Yushchyshyn (to Vorskla Poltava)
—	MF	UKR	Oleksandr Melnyk (Released)
—	FW	MNE	Marko Mrvaljević (Loan to (Poland) Łódź)
—	DF	UKR	Denys Balan (to Podillia Khmelnytskyi)
—	MF	BRA	Iago Siqueira (to (Latvia) Riga)
—	FW	UKR	Denys Svityukha (to Kudrivka)

=== Vorskla Poltava ===
In:

No.	Pos.	Nation	Player
—	MF	KOS	Milot Avdila (from (Switzerland) Aarau)
—	MF	CRC	Fernán Faerrón (on loan from (Costa Rica) Herediano)
—	MF	UKR	Illya Krupskyi (on loan from Metalist 1925 Kharkiv)
—	MF	UKR	Vladyslav Kulach (free agent)
—	MF	UKR	Yevhen Pasich (on loan from Metalist 1925 Kharkiv)
—	MF	UKR	Anton Salabay (on loan from Kolos Kovalivka)
—	MF	UKR	Vadym Yushchyshyn (from Veres Rivne)

Out:

No.	Pos.	Nation	Player
—	DF	UKR	Oleksandr Chornomorets (to Metalist 1925 Kharkiv)
—	MF	UKR	Illya Krupskyi (to Metalist 1925 Kharkiv)
—	FW	UKR	Mykola Kovtalyuk (to Kolos Kovalivka)

=== Zorya Luhansk ===
In:

No.	Pos.	Nation	Player
—	MF	BIH	Dejan Popara (from (Bosnia and Herzegovina) Sloga Meridian)
—	MF	UKR	Volodymyr Bilotserkovets (from Inhulets Petrove)

Out:

No.	Pos.	Nation	Player
—	DF	NGA	Christopher Nwaeze (to (Moldova) Milsami Orhei)

== Ukrainian First League ==
=== Ahrobiznes Volochysk ===
In:

No.	Pos.	Nation	Player
—	DF	UKR	Ernest Romanchuk (from Dinaz Vyshhorod)
—	MF	UKR	Artem Syomka (from Prykarpattia Ivano-Frankivsk)
—	MF	UKR	Bohdan Kozak (from Nyva Ternopil)
—	MF	UKR	Andriy Zin (from Nyva Ternopil)
—	DF	UKR	Artem Nyzhnyk (from Horishni Plavni)

Out:

No.	Pos.	Nation	Player
—	DF	UKR	Ruslan Barylyak (Released)

=== Bukovyna Chernivtsi ===
In:

No.	Pos.	Nation	Player
—	MF	UKR	Oleh Kozhushko (from Kryvbas Kryvyi Rih)
—	MF	UKR	Rodion Plaksa (from Oleksandriya)
—	MF	UKR	Kyrylo Prokopchuk (from Mynai)
—	MF	UKR	Oleksandr Vasylyev (from Chornomorets Odesa)

Out:

No.	Pos.	Nation	Player
—	MF	UKR	Davronbek Azizov (from Podillia Khmelnytskyi)

=== Dinaz Vyshhorod ===
In:

No.	Pos.	Nation	Player
—	GK	UKR	Ruslan Karnaushenko

Out:

No.	Pos.	Nation	Player
—	GK	UKR	Oleksandr Bandura (Released)
—	GK	UKR	Vadym Dmytrochenko (Released)
—	DF	UKR	Mykyta Baranov (Released)
—	DF	UKR	Ernest Romanchuk (to Ahrobiznes Volochysk)
—	MF	UKR	Suleyman Seytkhalilov (to Viktoriya Sumy)
—	MF	UKR	Yehor Kartushov (to Chernihiv)
—	MF	UKR	Vladyslav Ohirya (Released)
—	MF	UKR	Yevhen Chepurnenko (Released)
—	FW	UKR	Dmytro Kulyk (to Chernihiv)
—	FW	UKR	Andriy Novikov (to Chernihiv)
—	FW	UKR	Artem Khotsyanovskyi (Released)

=== Epitsentr ===
In:

No.	Pos.	Nation	Player
—	MF	UKR	Yehor Demchenko (from Mariupol)

Out:

No.	Pos.	Nation	Player
—	MF	UKR	Vitaliy Ravlyk (Reliesed)

=== Kremin Kremenchuk ===
In:

No.	Pos.	Nation	Player
—	MF	UKR	Denys Halata (loan return from (Latvia) Grobiņas)

Out:

No.	Pos.	Nation	Player
—	FW	UKR	Myroslav Trofymiuk (to Prykarpattia)

=== Kudrivka ===
In:

No.	Pos.	Nation	Player
—	MF	UKR	Ivan Melnychenko (from Mariupol)
—	MF	UKR	Kyrylo Matvyeyev (From Karpaty Lviv)
—	FW	UKR	Denys Svityukha (From Veres Rivne)
—	MF	UKR	Mykhaylo Shershen (From Inhulets Petrove)

Out:

No.	Pos.	Nation	Player
—	DF	UKR	Illya Cherednychenko (Released)
—	MF	UKR	Kyrylo Matvyeyev (loan return to Karpaty Lviv)
—	MF	UKR	Vladyslav Nekhtiy (Released)
—	MF	UKR	Danylo Volynets (Released)
—	FW	UKR	Yaroslav Kvasov (Released)

=== FSC Mariupol ===
In:

No.	Pos.	Nation	Player

Out:

No.	Pos.	Nation	Player
—	GK	UKR	Illya Karavashchenko (to Livyi Bereh Kyiv)
—	DF	UKR	Dmytro Fatyeyev (to Chernihiv)
—	DF	UKR	Pavlo Shushko (to Chernihiv)
—	MF	UKR	Dmytro Penteleychuk (to Kulykiv-Bilka)
—	MF	UKR	Ivan Melnychenko (to Kudrivka)
—	MF	UKR	Yehor Demchenko (to Epitsentr)

=== Metalist 1925 ===
In:

No.	Pos.	Nation	Player
—	DF	UKR	Oleksandr Chornomorets (from Vorskla Poltava)
—	MF	UKR	Oleksiy Husyev (on loan from Dynamo Kyiv)
—	MF	UKR	Illya Krupskyi (from Vorskla Poltava)
—	MF	BRA	Pedro Arthur (from (Brazil) Concordia)
—	MF	KOS	Ermir Rashica (from (Albania) Skënderbeu)
—	FW	NGA	Christian Mba (from (Albania) Partizani)

Out:

No.	Pos.	Nation	Player
—	DF	UKR	Vadym Chervak (Relisead)
—	MF	UKR	Denys Harmash (Relisead)
—	MF	UKR	Ihor Kohut (on loan to Chornomorets Odesa)
—	MF	UKR	Illya Krupskyi (on loan to Vorskla Poltava)
—	MF	UKR	Yevhen Pasich (on loan to Vorskla Poltava)
—	MF	UKR	Beka Vachiberadze (to (Kazakhstan) Ulytau)
—	FW	UKR	Oleksiy Sydorov (on loan to Kolos Kovalivka)

=== Metalist Kharkiv ===
In:

No.	Pos.	Nation	Player

Out:

No.	Pos.	Nation	Player
—	MF	UKR	Hennadiy Synchuk (to (Canada) CF Montréal)

=== FC Mynai ===
In:

No.	Pos.	Nation	Player
—	MF	UKR	Mykhaylo Rasko (on loan from Polissya Zhytomyr)

Out:

No.	Pos.	Nation	Player
—	GK	UKR	Denys Barchenko (Released)
—	DF	UKR	Vladyslav Dvorovenko (Released)
—	MF	UKR	Danyil Khondak (Released)
—	MF	AZE	Dmitri Naghiyev (Released)
—	MF	UKR	Vladyslav Yeremenko (Released)
—	MF	UKR	Yehor Shalfeyev (to Chernihiv)
—	FW	UKR	Oleh Vyshnevskyi (Released)
—	MF	UKR	Artur Remenyak (to Rukh Lviv)
—	MF	UKR	Kyrylo Prokopchuk (to Bukovyna Chernivtsi)

=== Nyva Ternopil ===
In:

No.	Pos.	Nation	Player
—	DF	UKR	Andriy Demydenko (from UCSA Tarasivka)
—	MF	UKR	Maryan Mysyk (to Inhulets Petrove)

Out:

No.	Pos.	Nation	Player
—	MF	UKR	Bohdan Kozak (to Ahrobiznes Volochysk)
—	MF	UKR	Andriy Kukharuk (to Podillya Khmelnytskyi)
—	MF	UKR	Andriy Riznyk (Released)
—	MF	UKR	Andriy Zin (to Ahrobiznes Volochysk)

=== Podillya Khmelnytskyi ===
In:

No.	Pos.	Nation	Player
—	GK	UKR	Dmytro Fastov (from Livyi Bereh Kyiv)
—	DF	UKR	Denys Balan (from Veres Rivne)
—	MF	UKR	Davronbek Azizov (from Bukovyna Chernivtsi)
—	MF	UKR	Andriy Kukharuk (from Nyva Ternopil)

Out:

No.	Pos.	Nation	Player
—	GK	UKR	Dmytro Nepohodov (to (Kazakhstan) Ulytau)

=== Prykarpattia Ivano-Frankivsk ===
In:

No.	Pos.	Nation	Player
—	MF	UKR	Yuriy Romanyuk (from Karpaty Lviv)
—	MF	UKR	Oleksandr Tsybulnyk (from Podillya Khmelnytskyi)
—	FW	UKR	Myroslav Trofymiuk (from Kremin Kremenchuk)

Out:

No.	Pos.	Nation	Player
—	MF	UKR	Pavlo Zamurenko (Released)
—	FW	UKR	Artem Syomka (to Ahrobiznes Volochysk)
—	MF	UKR	Rodion Plaksa (Released)
—	FW	UKR	Oleh Kos (to Kulykiv-Bilka)

=== UCSA Tarasivka ===
In:

No.	Pos.	Nation	Player
—	GK	UKR	Vitaliy Chebotaryov (from Livyi Bereh Kyiv)
—	DF	UKR	Pavlo Lukyanchuk (from Obolon Kyiv)

Out:

No.	Pos.	Nation	Player
—	DF	UKR	Andriy Demydenko (to Nyva Ternopil)
—	DF	UKR	Dmytro Makhnyev
—	FW	UKR	Aderinsola Eseola (Released)

=== Viktoriya Sumy ===
In:

No.	Pos.	Nation	Player
—	FW	UKR	Oleksandr Chernetskyi (from Polissya Stavky)
—	MF	UKR	Suleyman Seytkhalilov (from Dinaz Vyshhorod)

Out:

No.	Pos.	Nation	Player

== Ukrainian Second League ==
=== SC Chaika ===
In:

No.	Pos.	Nation	Player

Out:

No.	Pos.	Nation	Player
—	DF	UKR	Bohdan Khobta (Released)
—	MF	UKR	Oleksiy Teplyuk (Released)
—	MF	UKR	Vitaliy Shmorgun (Released)
—	MF	UKR	Vladyslav Garnaga (Released)
—	MF	UKR	Oleksiy Sychevskyi (Released)
—	MF	UKR	Dmytro Shakun (Released)

=== FC Chernihiv ===
In:

No.	Pos.	Nation	Player
—	FW	UKR	Dmytro Kulyk (from Dinaz Vyshhorod)
—	MF	UKR	Yehor Kartushov (from Dinaz Vyshhorod)
—	MF	UKR	Yehor Shalfeyev (from Mynai)
—	FW	UKR	Andriy Novikov (from Dinaz Vyshhorod)
—	DF	UKR	Dmytro Fatyeyev (from FSC Mariupol)
—	DF	UKR	Pavlo Shushko (from Mariupol)

Out:

No.	Pos.	Nation	Player
—	MF	UKR	Bogdan Lyanskoronsky (Released)
—	MF	UKR	Andriy Makarenko (Released)
—	MF	UKR	Kyrylo Kryvoborodenko (Released)
—	DF	UKR	Andriy Veresotskyi (Retired)
—	DF	UKR	Andriy Lakeyenko (Retired)
—	MF	UKR	Kyrylo Pinchuk (Released)

=== Hirnyk-Sport Horishni Plavni ===
In:

No.	Pos.	Nation	Player

Out:

No.	Pos.	Nation	Player
—	DF	UKR	Artem Nyzhnyk (to Ahrobiznes Volochysk)

=== Kolos-2 Kovalivka ===
In:

No.	Pos.	Nation	Player

Out:

No.	Pos.	Nation	Player
—	MF	UKR	Ihor Kharatin (to Veres Rivne)
—	MF	UKR	Oleksiy Dytyatyev (retired)

=== Kulykiv-Bilka ===
In:

No.	Pos.	Nation	Player
—	DF	UKR	Mykola Kvasnyi
—	MF	UKR	Daniil Volkov
—	MF	UKR	Edvard Kobak (from Lokomotyv Kyiv)
—	MF	UKR	Oleksandr Dudarenko (from Livyi Bereh Kyiv)
—	MF	UKR	Dmytro Penteleychuk (from Mariupol)
—	MF	UKR	Vitaly Ravlyk
—	FW	UKR	Oleh Kos (from Prykarpattia Ivano-Frankivsk)

Out:

No.	Pos.	Nation	Player
—	FW	UKR	Danylo Pylypchukk (to Metalist 1925-2 Kharkiv)

=== Lokomotyv Kyiv ===
In:

No.	Pos.	Nation	Player

Out:

No.	Pos.	Nation	Player
—	DF	UKR	Magomed Kratov (to Chornomorets Odesa)
—	MF	UKR	Edvard Kobak (to Kulykiv-Bilka)
—	MF	UKR	Danylo Sydorenko (Released)
—	MF	UKR	Vladyslav Blazun (Released)
—	MF	UKR	Danylo Yanyuk (Released)
—	MF	UKR	Bohdan Melnyk (Released)
—	MF	UKR	Yaroslav Dobrokhotov (Released)

=== Metalist 1925-2 Kharkiv ===
In:

No.	Pos.	Nation	Player
—	FW	UKR	Danylo Pylypchuk (from Kulykiv-Bilka)

Out:

No.	Pos.	Nation	Player

=== Sambir-Nyva-2 Ternopil ===
In:

No.	Pos.	Nation	Player

Out:

No.	Pos.	Nation	Player
—	MF	UKR	Yehor Kolomiets (to Nyva Vinnytsia)

=== Nyva Vinnytsia ===
In:

No.	Pos.	Nation	Player
—	MF	UKR	Yehor Kolomiets (from Sambir-Nyva-2 Ternopil)

Out:

No.	Pos.	Nation	Player

=== Polissya Zhytomyr 2 ===
In:

No.	Pos.	Nation	Player
—	FW	UKR	Daniels Radzenieks (loan from Polissya Zhytomyr)

Out:

No.	Pos.	Nation	Player
—	GK	UKR	Artem Pospyelov (Released)
—	FW	UKR	Dmytro Shastal (to Livyi Bereh Kyiv)
—	MF	UKR	Bogdan Panchyshyn (loan to Chornomorets Odesa)

=== Real Pharma Odesa ===
In:

No.	Pos.	Nation	Player
—	MF	UKR	Vladyslav Komunitsky (Loan from Uzhhorod)

Out:

No.	Pos.	Nation	Player
—	MF	UKR	Nikita Ladyka (Released)
—	DF	UKR	Valeriy Hayvanenko (Released)
—	DF	UKR	Andriy Melenchuk (Released)
—	DF	UKR	Artem Movchanyuk (Released)
—	DF	UKR	Artem Andritsa (Released)
—	MF	UKR	Vadym Hranchar (Released)
—	MF	UKR	Yevhen Varban (Released)
—	MF	UKR	Andriy Varenyk (Released)
—	MF	UKR	Mark Shylov (Released)
—	MF	UKR	Kostyantyn Parkhomenko (Released)

=== Uzhhorod ===
In:

No.	Pos.	Nation	Player

Out:

No.	Pos.	Nation	Player
—	MF	UKR	Vladyslav Komunitsky (Loan to Real Pharma Odesa)

=== FC Trostianets ===
In:

No.	Pos.	Nation	Player

Out:

No.	Pos.	Nation	Player
—	DF	UKR	Anatolii Klius (Released)
—	DF	UKR	Roman Zoria (Released)
—	DF	UKR	Pavlo Gavrysh (Released)
—	DF	UKR	Semen Datsenko (Released)
—	MF	UKR	Serhii Kozak (Released)
—	MF	UKR	Mykyta Koshkin (Released)
—	FW	UKR	Yevhen Prodanov (Released)
