= Koval (surname) =

Koval (Ukrainian: Коваль, romanized: Koval') is a Ukrainian surname. The word means "blacksmith", making "Koval" the equivalent of "Smith" in the English-speaking world. Notable people with the name include:

- Anastasia Koval (born 1992), Ukrainian artistic gymnast
- Andriy Koval (born 1983), Ukrainian football player
- Denis Koval (born 1991), Russian speed skater
- George Koval (1913–2006), spy for the Soviet Union in the US
- Ihor Koval (born 1955), Ukrainian historian and political scholar
- Ivan Koval-Samborsky (1893–1962), Ukrainian stage and film actor
- J. J. Koval (born 1992), American soccer player
- Kate Koval (born 2006) Ukrainian basketball player
- Maksym Koval (born 1992), Ukrainian football goalkeeper
- Mykhailo Koval (born 1956), Ukrainian military officer and politician
- Mykola Koval (born 1952), Ukrainian operatic baritone
- Oleksandr Koval (born 1974), Ukrainian football player and coach
- Peter Kovál (born 1965), American photographer
- Ramona Koval (born 1954), Australian reporter
- Robin Koval (born 1955), American businesswoman
- Stanislav Koval (born 2002), Ukrainian football player
- Vera Koval (born 1983), Russian judoka
- Viktor Koval (1947–2021), Russian writer, poet and actor
- Viktoriya Koval (born 1985), Ukrainian archery athlete
- Vital Koval (born 1980), Belarusian ice hockey player
- Vitalina Koval (born 1990), Ukrainian LGBT rights activist
- Vitaliy Koval (born 1981), Ukrainian entrepreneur and politician
- Vlada Koval (born 2001), Russian tennis player
- Vladimir Koval (born 1975), Ukrainian-Canadian football player
- Volodymyr Koval (born 1992), Ukrainian football player
- Yevgeni Koval (born 1973), Russian football player
- Yuriy Koval (born 1958), Ukrainian football player and coach
- Yuriy Koval (born 1980), Ukrainian Greco-Roman wrestler
- Yury Koval (1938–1995), Russian author

== See also ==
- Koval (disambiguation)
