= Kowal =

Kowal may refer to:

- Kowal (surname), a surname
- Kowal (town), a town in Poland
- Kowal (gmina), a gmina (administrative district) in Poland
- 99P/Kowal, a periodic comet

== See also ==
- Koval (disambiguation)
- Kowall, a surname
