= Starchenko =

Starchenko (Ukrainian: Старченко) is a Ukrainian surname. Notable people with the surname include:

- Denys Starchenko (born 1994), Ukrainian footballer
- Roman Starchenko (born 1986), Kazakhstani ice hockey player
- Sergei Starchenko, mathematician
