= Semenko =

Semenko (Ukrainian: Семенко) is a gender-neutral Ukrainian surname that may refer to

- Andriy Semenko (born 1993), Ukrainian football player
- Dave Semenko (1957–2017), Canadian ice hockey scout, coach and player
- Mel Semenko (1937–2023), Canadian football player
- Mykhaylo Semenko (1892–1937), Ukrainian poet
