= Kowal (surname) =

Kowal is a Polish surname meaning "smith", or "blacksmith". It may refer to:

- Andrzej Kowal (born 1971), Polish volleyball coach
- Austin Kowal (born 1985), American artist
- Charles T. Kowal (1940–2011), American astronomer
- Chester A. Kowal (1904–1966), American politician
- Edmund Kowal (1931–1960), Polish footballer
- Emma Kowal, Australian anthropologist, physician and academic
- Frédéric Kowal (born 1970), French rower
- Grzegorz Kowal, Polish diplomat
- Jan Kowal (born 1967), Polish ski jumper
- Joe Kowal (born 1956), Canadian hockey player
- Kristy Kowal (born 1978), American swimmer
- Maksym Kowal (born 1991), Canadian soccer player
- Mandy Kowal (born 1963), American rower
- Marek Kowal (born 1985), Polish footballer
- Mary Robinette Kowal (born 1969), American author
- Matylda Kowal (born 1989), Polish runner
- Mitchell Kowal (1915–1971), American actor
- Paweł Kowal (born 1975), Polish politician
- Stanisław Kowal (1928–2001), Polish triple jumper
- Tom Kowal (born 1967), Canadian hockey referee
- Yoann Kowal (born 1987), French runner

== See also ==
- Kowall
