= Koval =

Koval may refer to:

- Koval (surname)
- Koval Distillery, a craft distillery in Chicago, Illinois

== Fiction ==
- Funky Koval, a 1980s Polish comic book
- Koval, a Romulan in Inter Arma Enim Silent Leges (Star Trek: Deep Space Nine)

== See also ==
- Kowal (disambiguation)
- Kovel, a city in Ukraine
- Kovalan, a character in Tamil epic Silappatikaram
  - Kovalanpottal, place in Madurai, Tamil Nadu, India where he is said to have died
- Kovalam, area in Trivandrum, Kerala, India
