= Vlasivka, Kirovohrad Oblast =

Rural locality in Kirovohrad Oblast, Ukraine

Vlasivka Власівка
- Rural settlement
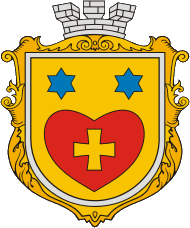
- Flag Coat of arms

- Location in Kirovohrad Oblast Location in Ukraine
- Coordinates: 49°06′40″N 33°17′00″E
- Country: Ukraine
- Oblast: Kirovohrad Oblast
- Raion: Oleksandriia Raion
- Hromada: Svitlovodsk urban hromada

Population (2022)
  - Total: 7,258
- Time zone: UTC+2 (EET)
  - Summer (DST): UTC+3 (EEST)

Vlasivka (Ukrainian: Власівка; Russian: Власовка) is a rural settlement in Oleksandriia Raion of Kirovohrad Oblast in Ukraine. It is located on the left bank of the Dnieper next to the Kremenchuk Hydroelectric Power Plant and close to the city of Kremenchuk. This is the only locality in Kirovohrad Oblast on the left bank of the Dnieper. Vlasivka belongs to Svitlovodsk urban hromada, one of the hromadas of Ukraine. Population: 7,258 (2022 estimate).

== History ==
Until 18 July 2020, Vlasivka belonged to Svitlovodsk Municipality. The municipality was abolished as an administrative unit in July 2020 as part of the administrative reform of Ukraine, which reduced the number of raions of Kirovohrad Oblast to four. The area of Svitlovodsk Municipality was merged into Oleksandriia Raion.

Until 26 January 2024, Vlasivka was designated urban-type settlement. On this day, a new law entered into force which abolished this status, and Vlasivka became a rural settlement.

== Economy ==
=== Transportation ===
Livoberezhna Railway Station is in Vlasivka. This is a terminal station which is connected to Kremenchuk, however, there is no passenger navigation. The closes station with passenger navigation is Nedoharky, where there are infrequent passenger connections with Svitlovodsk across the hydropower plant dam. In Kremenchuk, there is frequent passenger traffic.

The settlement is connected by road with Kremenchuk and, over the dam, with Svitlovodsk.

== People from Vlasivka ==
- Serhiy Bilous (born 1999), Ukrainian footballer
