= Yevgeni Koval =

Russian footballer

Personal information
- Full name: Yevgeni Anatolyevich Koval
- Date of birth: 17 January 1973 (age 53)
- Height: 1.72 m (5 ft 7 1/2 in)
- Positions: Defender; midfielder

Senior career*
| Years | Team | Apps | (Gls) |
| 1990 | FC Signal Izobilny | 9 | (0) |
| 1991–1992 | FC Dynamo Stavropol | 18 | (1) |
| 1992 | FC Dynamo-APK Izobilny | 2 | (0) |
| 1992 | FC Iskra Novoaleksandrovsk | 11 | (0) |
| 1993 | FC Beshtau Lermontov | 34 | (4) |
| 1994 | FC Dynamo-d Stavropol | 28 | (1) |
| 1995–1997 | FC Energiya Pyatigorsk | 90 | (3) |
| 1997 | FC Kavkazkabel Prokhladny | 16 | (0) |
| 1998–1999 | FC Avtodor Vladikavkaz | 67 | (2) |
| 2000–2001 | FC Kavkazkabel Prokhladny | 70 | (0) |
| 2001 | FC Kristall Maysky | | |
| 2002–2003 | FC Kavkazkabel Prokhladny | 68 | (1) |
| 2004 | FC Kavkazkabel Prokhladny (amateur) | | |
| 2005 | FC Dynamo Stavropol (amateur) | | |
| 2011 | FC Gigant Sotnikovskoye | | |
- * Club domestic league appearances and goals

Yevgeni Anatolyevich Koval (Russian: Евгений Анатольевич Коваль; born 17 January 1973) is a former Russian football player.

Koval played in the Russian Premier League with FC Dynamo Stavropol.
