= Yaroslav Zakharevych =

Ukrainian footballer

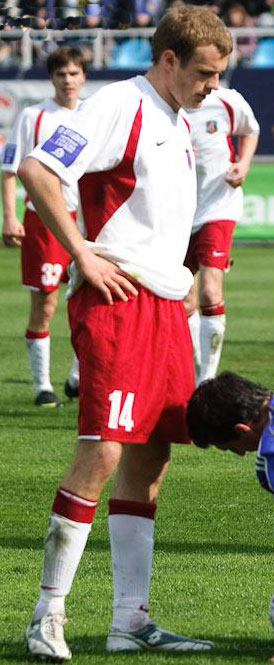
- Yaroslav Zakharevych in 2010.

Personal information
- Full name: Yaroslav Olehovych Zakharevych
- Date of birth: 24 September 1989 (age 37)
- Place of birth: Kyiv, Ukrainian SSR, Soviet Union
- Height: 1.79 m (5 ft 10 1/2 in)
- Position: Midfielder

Team information
- Current team: Nyva Buzova
- Number: 77

Youth career
- 2002–2003: Dynamo Kyiv
- 2003: FC Vidradnyi Kyiv
- 2004: Lokomotyv-MSM-OMIKS Kyiv
- 2004–2006: Arsenal Kyiv

Senior career*
Years	Team	Apps	(Gls)
2006–2011	Arsenal Kyiv	12	(0)
2009	→ Nyva Ternopil (loan)	8	(1)
2011–2012	Kryvbas Kryvyi Rih	2	(0)
2012–2013	Obolon Kyiv	18	(1)
2012	→ Obolon-2 Kyiv	1	(2)
2013–2015	Cherkaskyi Dnipro	58	(15)
2015–2016	Nyva Ternopil	10	(2)
2016	Arsenal Bila Tserkva	8	(5)
2016	Obolon-Brovar Kyiv	8	(1)
2017	Sumy	8	(2)
2017–2018	Cherkaskyi Dnipro	25	(3)
2018–2019	Polissya Zhytomyr	21	(2)
2019	Balkany Zorya	14	(0)
2020	Cherkashchyna	11	(1)
2020–2023	Nyva Buzova	14	(0)
2023	Druzhba Myrivka	12	(2)
2024–	Nyva Buzova	7	(0)

International career
2009	Ukraine-21	1	(0)
- * Club domestic league appearances and goals as of 20 June 2024

Yaroslav Zakharevych (Ukrainian: Ярослав Олегович Захаревич; born 24 September 1989) is a Ukrainian professional football midfielder who plays for Nyva Buzova.

== Career ==
He played for FC Nyva Ternopil and for FC Obolon Kyiv which dissolved itself in February 2013.
