= Serhiy Bilous =

Ukrainian footballer

Personal information
- Full name: Serhiy Andriyovych Bilous
- Date of birth: 18 June 1999 (age 27)
- Place of birth: Vlasivka, Ukraine
- Height: 1.75 m (5 ft 9 in)
- Position: Right winger

Youth career
- 2013–2015: Kremin Kremenchuk
- 2014–2015: → Kremin-2 Kremenchuk
- 2015–2016: Piddubny Olympic College

Senior career*
Years	Team	Apps	(Gls)
2016	Druzhba Ocheretuvate		
2017	Zirka Kropyvnytskyi	0	(0)
2017	Hlobyne	6	(0)
2018–2020	Hirnyk-Sport Horishni Plavni	15	(0)
2020–2021	Kremin Kremenchuk	37	(1)
- * Club domestic league appearances and goals as of 17 February 2022

Serhiy Andriyovych Bilous (Ukrainian: Сергій Андрійович Білоус; born 18 June 1999) is a Ukrainian professional footballer who plays as a right winger.
