= Mykola Koval (baritone) =

Belarusian-born Ukrainian opera singer

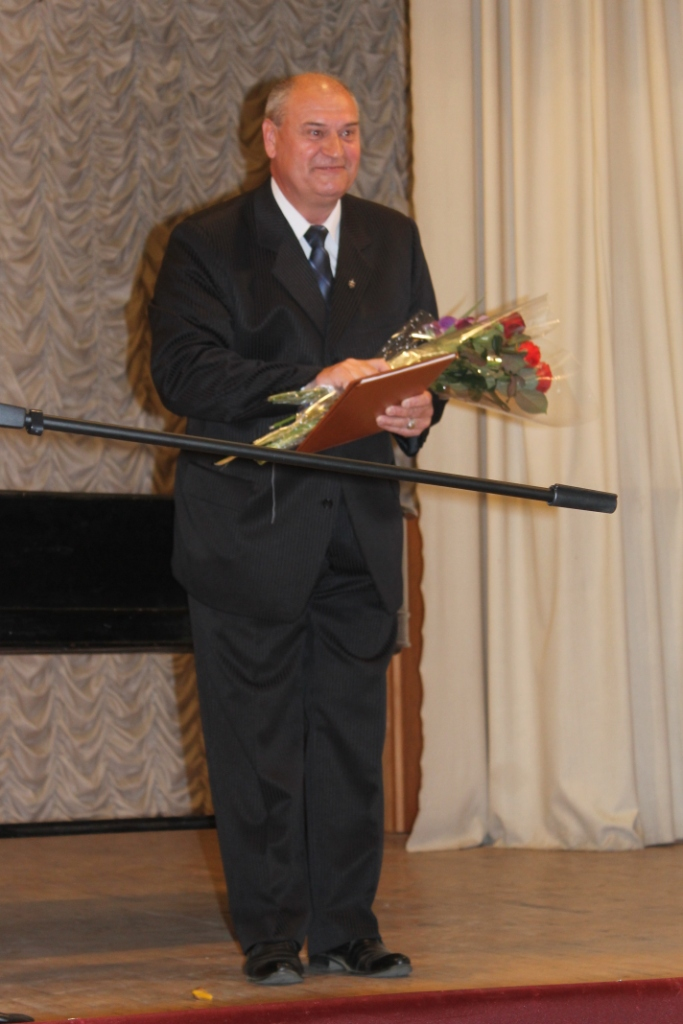
Mykola Koval, 2013

Mykola Koval (Ukrainian: Микола Олексійович Коваль; born 1 February 1952) is a Belarusian-born operatic baritone. He was born in Brest Region and studied solo singing in Minsk Conservatory and then in Moscow Conservatory. Since 1981, he has been a singer at the Kyiv Opera and Ballet Theatre. People's Artist of Ukraine. Since 1995, he has been a professor of Kyiv University of National Culture and Art.
