= Kowall =

Kowall is a surname. Notable bearers include:

- Eileen Kowall (born 1952), American politician, wife of Mike
- Mike Kowall (born 1951), American politician, husband of Eileen

== See also ==
- Kowal (disambiguation)
- Kowalski
- Cowell (surname)
