= Oleksandr Holovko (footballer, born 1995) =

Ukrainian footballer

Personal information
- Full name: Oleksandr Oleksandrovych Holovko
- Date of birth: 11 March 1995 (age 31)
- Place of birth: Kyiv, Ukraine
- Height: 1.83 m (6 ft 0 in)
- Position: Defender

Team information
- Current team: Raon-l'Étape

Youth career
- 2009: Dynamo Kyiv
- 2009–2010: Zirka Kyiv
- 2010–2011: Dynamo Kyiv
- 2011–2012: RVUFK Kyiv

Senior career*
Years	Team	Apps	(Gls)
2012	Arsenal Kyiv	0	(0)
2013–2016	Dynamo Kyiv	0	(0)
2015–2016	→ Dynamo-2 Kyiv	10	(0)
2016–2018	Desna Chernihiv	15	(1)
2019	Hirnyk-Sport Horishni Plavni	10	(1)
2020–2021	Kremin Kremenchuk	40	(0)
2022	Prykarpattia Ivano-Frankivsk	0	(0)
2022–	Raon-l'Étape	35	(0)
- * Club domestic league appearances and goals as of 9 April 2026

Oleksandr Oleksandrovych Holovko (Ukrainian: Олександр Олександрович Головко; born 11 March 1995) is a Ukrainian professional football defender who plays for Raon-l'Étape.

== Career ==
Holovko is a product of the different youth sportive schools in his native Kiev. He signed a three-year contract with FC Dynamo Kyiv in the Ukrainian Premier League in February 2013, but did not debut for the first-squad team. In October 2016, Holovko signed a contract with the Ukrainian First League FC Desna Chernihiv.

== Personal life ==
Holovko is the eldest son of the retired Ukrainian international footballer and current manager Oleksandr Holovko. He has also a brother Andriy and sister Arina.

== Honours ==
=== Desna Chernihiv ===
- Ukrainian First League: 2017–18
