= Ruslan Nepeypiyev =

Ukrainian footballer

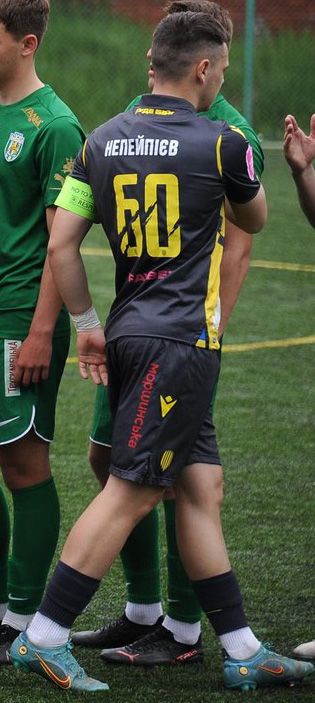
- Ruslan Nepeypiev playing for Rukh-2 Lviv in 2023

Personal information
- Full name: Ruslan Oleksiyovych Nepeypiyev
- Date of birth: 3 June 2003 (age 23)
- Place of birth: Banyliv Pidhirnyi, Ukraine
- Height: 1.78 m (5 ft 10 in)
- Position: Striker

Team information
- Current team: Hebar
- Number: 88

Youth career
- Youth Sportive School Storozhynets
- 2016–2019: Bukovyna Chernivtsi
- 2019–2020: UFK-Karpaty Lviv

Senior career*
Years	Team	Apps	(Gls)
2020–2024	Rukh Lviv	2	(0)
2023	→ Rukh-2 Lviv	25	(5)
2024	→ Livyi Bereh Kyiv (loan)	4	(0)
2025	FSC Mariupol	20	(2)
2026–	Hebar	14	(2)

International career^{‡}
2021	Ukraine U19	1	(0)
- * Club domestic league appearances and goals as of 11 June 2026 ‡ National team caps and goals as of 1 September 2022

Ruslan Oleksiyovych Nepeypiyev (Ukrainian: Руслан Олексійович Непейпієв; born 3 June 2003) is a Ukrainian professional footballer who plays as a striker for Bulgarian club Hebar Pazardzhik.

== Career ==
=== Early years ===
Born in Banyliv Pidhirnyi, Nepeypiyev began his career in the neighbouring Storozhynets youth sportive school, where his first trainer was Vasyl Heshko and then continued in the Bukovyna Chernivtsi and the UFK-Karpaty Lviv youth sportive school systems.

=== Rukh Lviv ===
In September 2020 he signed a contract with the Ukrainian Premier League side Rukh Lviv, but only played in the Ukrainian Premier League Reserves and made his debut in the Ukrainian Premier League as a second half-time substituted player in an away losing match against Kolos Kovalivka on 28 August 2022.
