= Peter Kovál =

American photographer and artist (born 1965)

Peter Koval
- Born: Peter Kowaleszyn; August 11, 1965 (age 60); U.S.
- Education: San Francisco Art Institute
- Known for: Photography
- Website: peterkoval.com

Peter Kovál, usually spelled Koval, is a professional photographer and artist.

== Background ==
Peter Koval attended the San Francisco Art Institute and graduated with a fine-arts degree. He studied photography, painting, and performance with notable artists such as Linda Connor, Jock Sturges. Kathy Acker, George Kuchar, Lynn Hershman Leeson and Henry Wessel Jr. His artwork was exhibited in numerous galleries as he gained national recognition.

In the early 1990s, Peter Koval became an Art Director for a number of well-known music and internet magazines in the San Francisco Bay area. After redesigning a publication started by TED Talks curator Chris Anderson (entrepreneur) called 'The Net', he started his own award-winning design firm specializing in brand identity and publication design called MBD ("Murder By Design").

In the mid-1990s and moved to New York City to pursue his photography career. He currently resides in New York City, Los Angeles and Seattle.

== Art career ==
His iconic images have appeared in international magazines and billboards, including Harper's Bazaar, Vogue China, Elle, Götland Vodka, Nestle, L.A. Confidential, Ocean Drive, Cosmopolitan and numerous others. He has also photographed supermodels Milla Jovovich, Ève Salvail, and Iman. He was also commissioned by Apl.de.ap of the Black Eyed Peas for a photoshoot to help launch a solo album and Apl's charity This Time Foundation to help children in the Philippines. .

Koval has also made television appearances. His first cameo appearance was on Sex and the City coincidentally he played a photographer. Later that year he was on stage with rapper Eminem in the 2003 live performance of the MTV Video Music Awards at Radio City Music Hall. He played a background performer during Eminem's songs, "White America", and "Cleaning Out My Closet".

In addition to photography, Koval continues to paint in the watercolor medium. His impressionist paintings try to capture an older, grittier New York city which is rapidly being renovated and cleaned up.

== Personal life ==
Peter Koval's father is a holocaust survivor and escapee. In his personal life Koval is active in martial arts, specifically Wing Tsun Kung Fu, and strong supporter of Transcendental Meditation.
