= Oleksandr Dudarenko =

Ukrainian footballer

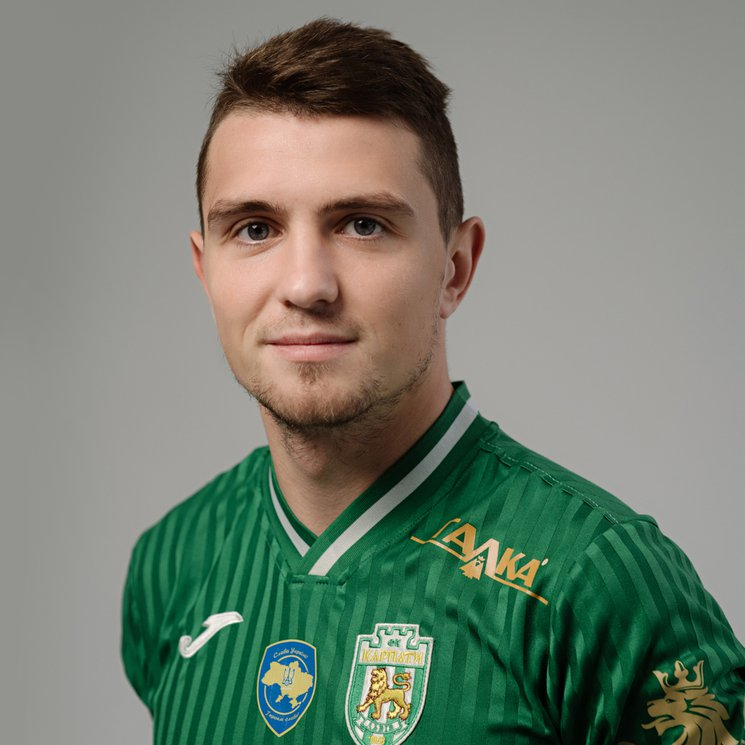

Personal information
- Full name: Oleksandr Serhiyovych Dudarenko
- Date of birth: 10 May 1995 (age 31)
- Place of birth: Lviv, Ukraine
- Height: 1.74 m (5 ft 9 in)
- Position: Centre-back

Youth career
- 2008–2014: Karpaty Lviv

Senior career*
Years	Team	Apps	(Gls)
2016–2017	Mykolaiv	6	(0)
2017–2018	Skala Stryi	13	(0)
2018–2019	Nyva Vinnytsia	23	(0)
2019–2020	Veres Rivne	13	(0)
2021–2022	Karpaty Lviv	23	(3)
2022–2023	Nyva Ternopil	3	(0)
2023–2024	Livyi Bereh Kyiv	29	(1)
2025–	Kulykiv-Bilka	19	(1)
- * Club domestic league appearances and goals as of 25 September 2025

Oleksandr Serhiyovych Dudarenko (Ukrainian: Олександр Сергійович Дударенко; born 30 June 1994) is a Ukrainian professional footballer who plays as a centre-back.

== Career ==
Born in Lviv, Dudarenko started playing football in Karpaty Lviv-2.

In 2017, he signed with Mykolaiv in Ukrainian First League.

In 2018 signed for Skala Stryi, where played 13 matches and in 2019 he moved to Nyva Ternopil in Ukrainian Second League.

In summer 2019 he joined Veres Rivne in the Ukrainian Second League, where he helped the club earn promotion to the Ukrainian First League.

In 2021 he joined to Karpaty Lviv in Ukrainian Football Amateur League.

In 2023, he signed for Livyi Bereh Kyiv in Ukrainian First League, where in the meantime he got promoted to Ukrainian Premier League.

In January 2025, he moved to Kulykiv-Bilka in Ukrainian Second League. In December 2025 his contract with the club was expired.

== Personal life ==
The brother of his grandfather Volodymyr Dudarenko was also a professional footballer.
