= Ernest Astakhov =

Ukrainian footballer

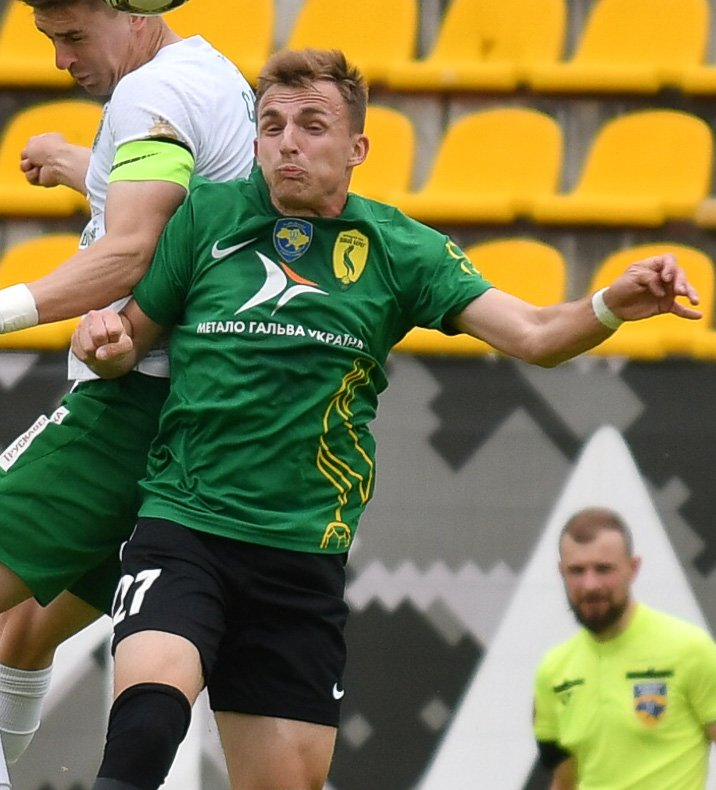
- Astakhov in 2024

Personal information
- Full name: Ernest Dmytrovych Astakhov
- Date of birth: 21 August 1998 (age 28)
- Place of birth: Dnipropetrovsk, Ukraine
- Height: 1.78 m (5 ft 10 in)
- Position: Defender

Team information
- Current team: Livyi Bereh Kyiv
- Number: 27

Youth career
- 2007–2009: Inter Dnipropetrovsk
- 2009–2015: Dnipro Dnipropetrovsk

Senior career*
| Years | Team | Apps | (Gls) |
| 2015 | Inter Dnipropetrovsk | 11 | (0) |
| 2016 | Petrykivka | 9 | (0) |
| 2016–2018 | Nikopol | 41 | (0) |
| 2018–2020 | Kremin Kremenchuk | 25 | (0) |
| 2020–2021 | Torpedo-BelAZ Zhodino | 13 | (0) |
| 2022 | Continentals | | |
| 2022 | Jonava | 13 | (0) |
| 2023– | Livyi Bereh Kyiv | 51 | (0) |

International career
- Ukraine (students)
- * Club domestic league appearances and goals as of 3 June 2026

Ernest Dmytrovych Astakhov (Ukrainian: Ернест Дмитрович Астахов; born 21 August 1998) is a professional Ukrainian football defender who plays for Livyi Bereh Kyiv.

== Career ==
=== Early career ===
Born in Dnipro, Astakhov is a product of the various youth sports schools in his native city. He joined the professional ranks in 2016 when he signed with Nikopol in the Ukrainian Second League. He re-signed with the club for the 2017-18 season. During his two-year tenure with the club, he appeared in 40 league matches.

He remained in the third tier by signing with Kremin Kremenchuk in 2019. In his debut season with Kremin, he assisted the club in securing promotion to the Ukrainian First League by winning the league title. He would appear in 18 league matches but was released from his contract following the season's conclusion. His release was short-lived as he re-signed with the club for the next season and debuted in the second tier.

=== Belarus ===
In July 2020, he went abroad to sign with Torpedo-BelAZ Zhodino in the Belarusian Premier League. Initially, he tried out with the club and was ultimately offered a contract. Throughout his tenure with Torpedo, he played in the 2021–22 UEFA Europa Conference League against F.C. Copenhagen in both matches. After two seasons in Belarus, he departed from the club on February 8, 2022.

=== Lithuania ===
Before he officially played in Lithuania, he spent the summer months in the Canadian Soccer League with FC Continentals. Following his brief stint in Canada, he signed with Lithuania's FK Jonava of the A Lyga. He made his debut for Jonava on August 13, 2022, against Kauno Žalgiris.

=== Ukraine ===
After his stint abroad, he returned to his native country to play in the second division with Livyi Bereh Kyiv.

== Honors ==
FC Kremin Kremenchuk

- Ukrainian Second League Group B: 2018–19

== International career ==
Astakhov was called up to represent the Ukraine national student football team in 2019.
