= Klim Prykhodko =

Ukrainian footballer

Personal information
- Full name: Klim Hennadiyovych Prykhodko
- Date of birth: 9 February 2000 (age 26)
- Place of birth: Kryvyi Rih, Ukraine
- Height: 1.84 m (6 ft 0 in)
- Position: Defensive midfielder

Team information
- Current team: Livyi Bereh Kyiv (on loan from Kryvbas Kryvyi Rih)
- Number: 29

Youth career
- 2013–2016: Dnipro Dnipropetrovsk
- 2016–2018: Dynamo Kyiv

Senior career*
Years	Team	Apps	(Gls)
2018–2023	Shakhtar Donetsk	0	(0)
2020	→ Vorskla Poltava (loan)	0	(0)
2020	→ Mariupol (loan)	0	(0)
2021–2022	→ Kryvbas Kryvyi Rih (loan)	13	(2)
2023–	Kryvbas Kryvyi Rih	26	(3)
2024–	→ Livyi Bereh Kyiv (loan)	17	(1)

International career^{‡}
2016	Ukraine U16	1	(0)
2016–2017	Ukraine U17	4	(0)
2017	Ukraine U18	1	(0)
2018	Ukraine U19	6	(1)
- * Club domestic league appearances and goals as of 14 June 2025 ‡ National team caps and goals as of 10 August 2021

Klim Hennadiyovych Prykhodko (Ukrainian: Клім Геннадійович Приходько; born 9 February 2000) is a Ukrainian professional footballer who plays as a defensive midfielder for Livyi Bereh Kyiv, on loan from Kryvbas Kryvyi Rih.

== Career ==
Born in Kryvyi Rih, Prykhodko is a product of Dnipro Dnipropetrovsk and Dynamo Kyiv academies. He played on loan for Vorskla Poltava and Mariupol in the Ukrainian Premier League Reserves and in August 2021 signed one year loan contract with Kryvbas Kryvyi Rih from the Ukrainian First League.

On 7 January 2023 he moved to Kryvbas Kryvyi Rih signing a three-year contract.

== Personal life ==
Prykhodko is the son of the Ukrainian football manager Hennadiy Prykhodko.
