= Denys Chernysh =

Ukrainian footballer

Personal information
- Full name: Denys Oleksandrovych Chernysh
- Date of birth: 29 June 1999 (age 27)
- Place of birth: Kremenchuk, Ukraine
- Height: 1.80 m (5 ft 11 in)
- Position: Right back

Team information
- Current team: Hirnyk-Sport Horishni Plavni
- Number: 15

Youth career
- 2015–2016: Kremin Kremenchuk
- 2015: → Kremin-2 Kremenchuk

Senior career*
| Years | Team | Apps | (Gls) |
| 2016–2019 | Olimpik Donetsk | 0 | (0) |
| 2019–2020 | Hirnyk-Sport Horishni Plavni | 1 | (0) |
| 2020 | Kremin Kremenchuk | 8 | (0) |
| 2020– | Hirnyk-Sport Horishni Plavni | 64 | (1) |
- * Club domestic league appearances and goals as of 5 May 2025

Denys Oleksandrovych Chernysh (Ukrainian: Денис Олександрович Черниш; born 29 June 1999) is a Ukrainian professional footballer who plays as a right back for Ukrainian club Hirnyk-Sport Horishni Plavni.
