= Oleksiy Moyseyenko =

Ukrainian footballer (born 1991)

Personal information
- Full name: Oleksiy Anatoliyovych Moyseyenko
- Date of birth: 25 October 1991 (age 35)
- Place of birth: Novobohdanivka, Zaporizhzhia Oblast, Ukraine
- Height: 1.74 m (5 ft 9 in)
- Position: Striker

Team information
- Current team: Metalurh Zaporizhzhia
- Number: 10

Youth career
- 2002–2004: FC Burevisnyk Melitopol
- 2005–2008: Metalurh Zaporizhzhia

Senior career*
Years	Team	Apps	(Gls)
2008–2011	Metalurh Zaporizhzhia	1	(0)
2008–2011	→ Metalurh-2 Zaporizhzhia	37	(3)
2012	Milsami Orhei	9	(0)
2012	Bukovyna Chernivtsi	3	(0)
2013–2017	Hirnyk-Sport Horishni Plavni	129	(11)
2018–2019	Avanhard Kramatorsk	50	(2)
2020	Hirnyk-Sport Horishni Plavni	3	(0)
2020–	Metalurh Zaporizhzhia	0	(0)

International career^{‡}
2010	Ukraine-19	2	(0)
- * Club domestic league appearances and goals as of 1 October 2020 ‡ National team caps and goals as of 1 October 2020

Oleksiy Moyseyenko (Ukrainian: Олексій Анатолійович Мойсеєнко; born 25 October 1991) is a Ukrainian football striker who plays for Metalurh Zaporizhzhia.

Opanasenko is product of youth team sistem FC Burevisnyk Melitopol and FC Metalurh Zaporizhzhia. Made his debut for FC Metalurh entering as a second-half substitute against FC Illichivets Mariupol on 6 August 2010 in Ukrainian Premier League.
