= Andriy Zin =

Ukrainian footballer

Personal information
- Full name: Andriy Bohdanovych Zin
- Date of birth: 14 July 2000 (age 26)
- Place of birth: Ternopil, Ukraine
- Height: 1.81 m (5 ft 11 in)
- Position: Centre-back

Team information
- Current team: Ahrobiznes Volochysk
- Number: 3

Youth career
- 2012–2013: Ternopil
- 2013–2017: VIK-Volyn Volodymyr-Volynskyi
- 2017–2018: Munkach Mukachevo
- 2018: Volyn Lutsk

Senior career*
| Years | Team | Apps | (Gls) |
| 2016–2017 | DYuSSh-VIK Volodymyr-Volynskyi | 2 | (0) |
| 2018–2019 | Volyn Lutsk | 0 | (0) |
| 2019–2020 | Kovel-Volyn Kovel | 11 | (1) |
| 2020 | Plotycha | 0 | (0) |
| 2020–2025 | Nyva Ternopil | 83 | (6) |
| 2025– | Ahrobiznes Volochysk | 32 | (0) |
- * Club domestic league appearances and goals as of 3 June 2026

Andriy Bohdanovych Zin (Ukrainian: Андрій Богданович Зінь; born 14 July 2000) is a Ukrainian professional footballer who plays as a centre-back for Ukrainian club Ahrobiznes Volochysk.
