= Dmytro Fastov =

Ukrainian football goalkeeper

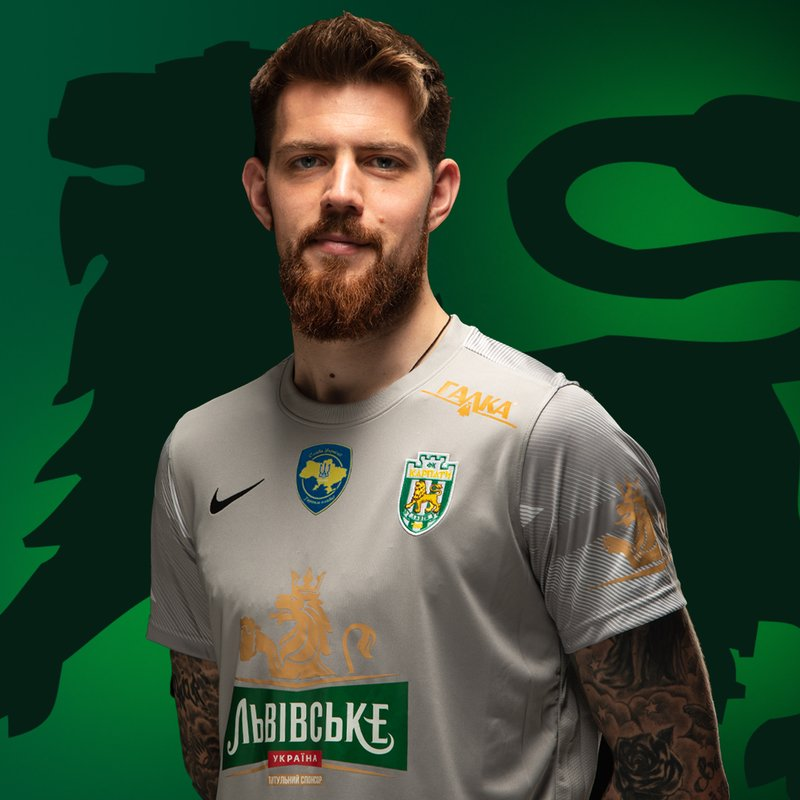

Personal information
- Full name: Dmytro Oleksiyovych Fastov
- Date of birth: 25 July 1997 (age 29)
- Place of birth: Kyiv, Ukraine
- Height: 1.98 m (6 ft 6 in)
- Position: Goalkeeper

Team information
- Current team: Vakhsh Bokhtar
- Number: 16

Youth career
- 2010–2013: Dynamo Kyiv

Senior career*
Years	Team	Apps	(Gls)
2013–2016	Dynamo Kyiv	0	(0)
2015–2016	→ Dynamo-2 Kyiv	4	(0)
2017	Inhulets Petrove	0	(0)
2017	→ Inhulets-2 Petrove	2	(0)
2017–2018	Veres Rivne	0	(0)
2018	Cova da Piedade	0	(0)
2018–2019	Sporting Ideal	0	(0)
2019	Hyères	0	(0)
2020	Kremin Kremenchuk	1	(0)
2020–2021	Obolon Kyiv	2	(0)
2020–2021	→ Obolon-2 Kyiv	10	(0)
2021	Mykolaiv	17	(0)
2022	LNZ Cherkasy	0	(0)
2022	Podhale Nowy Targ	1	(0)
2022–2024	Karpaty Lviv	1	(0)
2023–2024	→ Metalist Kharkiv (loan)	5	(0)
2024	Livyi Bereh Kyiv	0	(0)
2025	Podillya Khmelnytskyi	0	(0)
2026–	Vakhsh Bokhtar	2	(0)

International career
2013	Ukraine U16	2	(0)
2013–2014	Ukraine U17	15	(0)
2014–2015	Ukraine U18	4	(0)
- * Club domestic league appearances and goals as of 16 March 2026

Dmytro Oleksiyovych Fastov (Ukrainian: Дмитро Олексійович Фастов; born 25 July 1997) is a Ukrainian professional footballer who plays as a goalkeeper for Tajikistan Higher League club Vakhsh Bokhtar.

== Career ==
Fastov is a product of FC Dynamo Kyiv Youth Sportive School.

From summer 2013, after graduation of the youth sportive school, he played in the Ukrainian Premier League Reserves for FC Dynamo Kyiv reserves and in the Ukrainian First League for FC Dynamo-2 Kyiv. After the dissolution of FC Dynamo-2 he was signed by another Ukrainian First League team – Inhulets Petrove in March 2017. In July 2017 he was signed by the Ukrainian Premier League debutant Veres Rivne.

On 28 September 2018, he signed with Campeonato de Portugal club S.C. Ideal.

On 29 July 2022, after a short stint in Poland with Podhale Nowy Targ, he moved to Karpaty Lviv.
