= Denys Starchenko =

Ukrainian footballer

Personal information
- Full name: Denys Volodymyrovych Starchenko
- Date of birth: 18 July 1994 (age 32)
- Place of birth: Hlukhiv, Ukraine
- Height: 1.90 m (6 ft 3 in)
- Position: Goalkeeper

Youth career
- 2009–2011: Desna Chernihiv
- 2011: SDYuShOR Desna

Senior career*
Years	Team	Apps	(Gls)
2012–2014	Spartak-Kvartsyt Hlukhiv	10	(1)
2015	Veleten-Spartak Hlukhiv	5	(0)
2015–2016	Barsa Sumy	12	(0)
2016–2018	Enerhiya Nova Kakhovka	29	(0)
2018–2020	Mykolaiv	33	(0)
2019	→ Mykolaiv-2	3	(0)
2020	Krystal Kherson	0	(0)
2020–2021	Cherkashchyna	14	(0)
2021	Dnipro Cherkasy	12	(0)
2021	Kremin Kremenchuk	5	(0)
- * Club domestic league appearances and goals as of 18 February 2022

Denys Volodymyrovych Starchenko (Ukrainian: Денис Володимирович Старченко; born 18 July 1994) is a Ukrainian professional footballer who plays as a goalkeeper.
