= Ihor Koval =

Ukrainian political scientist

- Born: February 27, 1955 (age 71); Odesa, Ukrainian SSR, Soviet Union
- Known for: Rector of Odesa Mechnykov National University, founder of scientific school of researchers on international relations

Academic background
- Education: Odesa University, Doctor of Political Sciences

Academic work
- Discipline: International relations, political science
- Institutions: Odesa University
- Website: www.onu.edu.ua

Ihor Mykolaiovych Koval (Ukrainian: Iгор Миколайович Коваль, born February 27, 1955) is a Ukrainian political scientist on international relations, Doctor of Political Sciences, professor, Honored Worker of Science and Technology of Ukraine, corresponding member of the Ukrainian Academy of Political Sciences, rector of Odesa University.

== Biography ==
Ihor Koval was born February 27, 1955, in Odesa and graduated high school No.3 (known also as Mariinsky Gymnasium) in 1972. He graduated from the historical faculty of Odesa University (1978). Historian, teacher of history and social science. He defended his thesis in Taras Shevchenko National University of Kyiv. (1982). Assistant professor of modern and contemporary history (1978–1983); senior lecturer, assistant professor of modern and contemporary history, acting deputy dean of the History Faculty of I.I. Mechnikov ONU (1987–1996).

Since 1996 - director of the Social Sciences Institute at Mechnykov ONU. He defended his doctoral thesis on "The conceptual design of the United States Eastern European policy at the beginning of global transformation process" at the World Economy and International Relations Institute at Ukrainian National Academy of Sciences. He received the Doctor of Political Sciences degree in 2000 and in 2001 became a professor. In 2010 he was elected as a rector of the I.I. Mechnykov Odesa National University (ONU).

In 2015, by the decision of the university staff Ivan Koval was re-elected for a second term as a rector of ONU. Under the leadership of Rector Koval put into operation a new seven-story 6500 square meters academic building of the university (2013). Thanks to an investment strategy for the first time in the country's independence history it was in Mechnykov University where 90 families of university employees received state housing (2013). In 2010, the university launched a publishing house that produces up to 500 scientific and methodical literature units annually. In 2015 on the 150th anniversary of the ONU, university's history Museum was opened. Today, 28 scientific schools and 20 research laboratories are working at Mechnykov ONU.

== Social activity ==
1998 - 2004 - Igor Koval became Advisor of the Odesa Regional State Administration Chairman; 1997 - Director of the Odesa's applied social sciences program; 1997–1998 - Coordinator of the European research program in the framework of the EU TEMPUS-TACIC program; since 1999 - head of the scientific seminar on international relations theory of history and historiography at the House of Scientists (Odesa); 1995 - political media expert analyst.

== Titles and awards ==
- 2004 - Honored Worker of Science and Technology;
- 2009 - corresponding member of the Ukrainian Political Sciences Academy;
- 2016 - Honorary Doctor of the "Lower Danube" University Galati, Romania
- 2015, 2016 - the laureate of the media rankings "100 most influential personalities in Odesa" held by Forum of Journalists;
- 2016 – Order of Merit (Ukraine) III degree

== Scientific activity ==
I.N. Koval - founder of the Odesa International Studies Research School (founder of the foreign affairs history school was Academic S.I. Appatov, Odesa); As a specialist - expert in the field of international relations, I.N. Koval passed scientific training and conducted lectures at universities abroad:

- 1989 - scientific training and a course of lectures at Goucher College Baltimore, United States;
- 1993 - Fulbright Program for scientific research and lectures at Johns Hopkins University Baltimore, United States;
- 1994, 2005 - scientific training for foreign policy study in the post-Soviet states at Kennan Institute Washington D.C., United States.
- 2001- new training courses development at the University of Maryland, College Park United States

I.N. Koval is a member of international scientific societies and organizations:

- 1987 - Ukrainian Association of Political Science;
- 1992 - The association of foreign affairs researchers of the CIS countries
- 1993 - The Association of International Studies (US);
- 1994 - The Association of in-depth Slavic Studies (US);

Under the scientific direction of I.N. Koval three doctoral, fifteen PhD thesis was defended; more than 80 research papers was published in scientific journals of Ukraine, US, Germany, Russia, the Czech Republic, Slovenia, Poland and Hungary.

== Major works ==
"A critical analysis of the American bourgeois historiography: US East European policy concept." Odesa, 1984;
"The United States: modern foreign policy thought. American political science concept of the 80s analysis", Odesa, 1992;
«Ukraine and European Security », London- New York, 1999;
"The last “Cold War" battle: Eastern European superpowers policy in concepts of political science" (80th - 90th), Odesa, 1999;
"Euro-Atlantic integration of Ukraine: global and regional dimensions" Odesa, 2008;
"International relations and policy of the states in terms of global transformations: analysis of modern political thought" Odesa, 2016
