= Andriy Semenko =

Ukrainian footballer (born 1993)

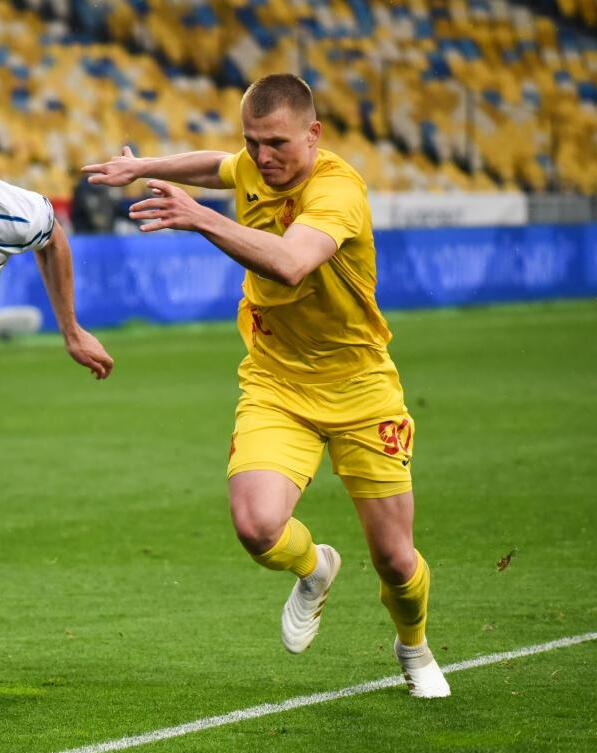

Personal information
- Full name: Andriy Mykolayovych Semenko
- Date of birth: 17 July 1993 (age 33)
- Place of birth: Fastiv, Ukraine
- Height: 1.84 m (6 ft 1/2 in)
- Position: Defender

Youth career
- 2006–2012: Knyazha Shchaslyve
- 2012–2013: Dynamo Fastiv

Senior career*
Years	Team	Apps	(Gls)
2013–2018	Kolos Kovalivka	89	(5)
2018	Juniors Shpytky	2	(0)
2018–2020	Obolon-Brovar Kyiv	34	(2)
2020–2021	Inhulets Petrove	20	(0)
2021–2022	Mynai	6	(0)
- * Club domestic league appearances and goals as of 24 January 2022

Andriy Mykolayovych Semenko (Ukrainian: Андрій Миколайович Семенко; born 17 July 1993) is a Ukrainian professional football defender.

== Career ==
Born in Kyiv Oblast, Semenko is a product of the two oblast's youth sportive schools.

Semenko played in the Ukrainian clubs of the different league levels, until June 2020, when he signed contract with the newly promoted to the Ukrainian Premier League FC Inhulets Petrove. He made his debut for Inhulets in the Ukrainian Premier League in a drawing home match against SC Dnipro-1 on 23 August 2020.
