= 2019–20 FC Shakhtar Donetsk season =

Shakhtar Donetsk
2019–20 season
- Chairman: Rinat Akhmetov
- Manager: Luís Castro
- Stadium: OSC Metalist
- Premier League: 1st
- Ukrainian Cup: Round of 16
- Ukrainian Super Cup: Runners-up
- UEFA Champions League: Group stage
- UEFA Europa League: Semi-finals
- Top goalscorer: League: Júnior Moraes (20); All: Júnior Moraes (26)
Home colours	Away colours	Third colours

The 2019–20 Shakhtar Donetsk season was the club's 29th season.

== Season events ==
On 11 June, Paulo Fonseca and his coaching staff left Shakhtar Donetsk to join A.S. Roma, with Luís Castro being appointed as Fonseca's replacement the following day.

Due to the COVID-19 pandemic in Ukraine, and based on resolutions of the Cabinet of Ukraine and the UAF Executive Committee, on 11 March the Ukrainian Premier League decided all games where to be played behind closed doors until 3 April 2020. Six days later, on 17 March, the Ukrainian Association of Football announced that all football in the country would be suspended from 18 March for the foreseeable future because of the COVID-19 pandemic.

== Squad ==
As of match played 17 August 2020

Number	Name	Nationality	Position	Date of birth (age)	Signed from	Signed in	Contract ends	Apps.	Goals
Goalkeepers
1	Oleksiy Shevchenko	(Ukraine)	GK	24 February 1992 (aged 28)	Karpaty Lviv	2018		7	0
30	Andriy Pyatov	(Ukraine)	GK	28 June 1984 (aged 36)	Vorskla Poltava	2007		460	0
81	Anatoliy Trubin	(Ukraine)	GK	1 August 2001 (aged 19)	Academy	2019		8	0
Defenders
4	Serhiy Kryvtsov	(Ukraine)	DF	15 March 1991 (aged 29)	Metalurh Zaporizhya	2010		181	12
5	Davit Khocholava	(Georgia (country))	DF	8 February 1993 (aged 27)	Chornomorets Odesa	2017		71	3
22	Mykola Matviyenko	(Ukraine)	DF	2 May 1996 (aged 24)	Academy	2015		78	4
31	Ismaily	(Brazil)	DF	11 January 1990 (aged 30)	Braga	2013		204	16
49	Vitão	(Brazil)	DF	2 February 2000 (aged 20)	Palmeiras	2019	2024	4	0
77	Valeriy Bondar	(Ukraine)	DF	27 February 1999 (aged 21)	Academy	2019		13	1
98	Dodô	(Brazil)	DF	17 November 1998 (aged 21)	Coritiba	2018	2022	36	3
Midfielders
6	Taras Stepanenko	(Ukraine)	MF	8 August 1989 (aged 31)	Metalurh Zaporizhya	2010		311	22
7	Taison	(Brazil)	MF	13 January 1988 (aged 32)	Metalist Kharkiv	2013		275	53
8	Marcos Antônio	(Brazil)	MF	13 June 2000 (aged 20)	Estoril	2019		40	4
9	Dentinho	(Brazil)	MF	19 January 1989 (aged 31)	Corinthians	2011		168	23
11	Marlos	(Ukraine)	MF	7 June 1988 (aged 32)	Metalist Kharkiv	2014		229	68
14	Tetê	(Brazil)	MF	15 February 2000 (aged 20)	Grêmio	2019		43	13
15	Yevhen Konoplyanka	(Ukraine)	MF	29 September 1989 (aged 30)	Schalke 04	2019	2022	28	5
17	Maksym Malyshev	(Ukraine)	MF	24 December 1992 (aged 27)	Academy	2009		77	7
19	Manor Solomon	(Israel)	MF	24 July 1999 (aged 21)	Maccabi Petah Tikva	2019		45	7
20	Viktor Kovalenko	(Ukraine)	MF	14 February 1996 (aged 24)	Academy	2015		189	28
21	Alan Patrick	(Brazil)	MF	13 February 1991 (aged 29)	Santos	2011		125	17
27	Maycon	(Brazil)	MF	15 July 1997 (aged 23)	Corinthians	2018		41	6
28	Marquinhos Cipriano	(Brazil)	MF	27 March 1999 (aged 21)	São Paulo	2018		17	1
50	Serhiy Bolbat	(Ukraine)	MF	13 January 1993 (aged 27)	Olimpik Donetsk	2011		55	3
75	Artem Bondarenko	(Ukraine)	DF	21 August 2000 (aged 19)	Academy	2020		5	0
76	Oleksandr Pikhalyonok	(Ukraine)	MF	7 May 1997 (aged 23)	Academy	2014		7	0
91	Mykhailo Mudryk	(Ukraine)	MF	5 January 2001 (aged 19)	Academy	2019		3	0
Forwards
10	Júnior Moraes	(Ukraine)	FW	4 April 1987 (aged 33)	Dynamo Kyiv	2018	2020	79	51
23	Vladyslav Vakula	(Ukraine)	FW	29 April 1999 (aged 21)	Mariupol	2019	2024	2	0
45	Danylo Sikan	(Ukraine)	FW	16 April 2001 (aged 19)	Karpaty Lviv	2019		8	0
99	Fernando	(Brazil)	FW	1 March 1999 (aged 21)	Palmeiras	2018		32	3
Away on loan
2	Bohdan Butko	(Ukraine)	DF	13 January 1991 (aged 29)	Academy	2008		64	1
8	Olarenwaju Kayode	(Nigeria)	FW	8 May 1993 (aged 27)	Manchester City	2018	2023		
15	Valeriy Bondarenko	(Ukraine)	DF	3 February 1994 (aged 26)	Oleksandriya	2019			
23	Andriy Boryachuk	(Ukraine)	FW	23 April 1996 (aged 24)	Academy	2015		17	6
52	Ihor Kyryukhantsev	(Ukraine)	DF	29 January 1996 (aged 24)	Academy	2013			
55	Oleh Kudryk	(Ukraine)	GK	17 October 1996 (aged 23)	Academy	2016			
56	Andriy Kulakov	(Ukraine)	MF	28 April 1999 (aged 21)	Metalist Kharkiv	2016			
57	Oleksiy Kashchuk	(Ukraine)	FW	29 June 2000 (aged 20)	Vorskla Poltava	2016			
59	Oleksandr Zubkov	(Ukraine)	MF	3 August 1996 (aged 24)	Academy	2014			
61	Dmytro Topalov	(Ukraine)	MF	12 March 1998 (aged 22)	Academy	2017			
62	Danylo Sahutkin	(Ukraine)	DF	19 April 1996 (aged 24)	Academy	2013			
65	Yukhym Konoplya	(Ukraine)	DF	26 August 1999 (aged 20)	Academy	2017			
71	Maksym Chekh	(Ukraine)	MF	3 January 1999 (aged 21)	Academy	2018			
72	Vyacheslav Churko	(Ukraine)	MF	10 May 1993 (aged 27)	Academy	2009			
73	Danylo Ihnatenko	(Ukraine)	MF	14 February 1996 (aged 24)	Metalurh Zaporizhya	2016		0	0
75	Viktor Korniyenko	(Ukraine)	DF	14 February 1999 (aged 21)	Academy	2016			
90	Artem Dudik	(Ukraine)	FW	4 April 1987 (aged 33)	Volyn Lutsk	2017		0	0
95	Eduard Sobol	(Ukraine)	DF	20 April 1995 (aged 25)	Metalurh Zaporizhya	2013			
Players who left during the season
12	Wellington Nem	(Brazil)	MF	6 February 1992 (aged 28)	Fluminense	2013		75	12
15	Gustavo Leschuk	(Argentina)	FW	5 November 1991 (aged 28)	Karpaty Lviv	2017		31	8
29	Andriy Totovytskyi	(Ukraine)	MF	20 January 1993 (aged 27)	Dynamo Kyiv	2010		9	1
50	Vladyslav Kulach	(Ukraine)	FW	7 May 1993 (aged 27)	Academy	2010			

=== On loan ===
Note: Flags indicate national team as defined under FIFA eligibility rules; some limited exceptions apply. Players may hold more than one non-FIFA nationality.

No.	Pos.	Nation	Player
2	DF	UKR	Bohdan Butko (on loan at Lech Poznań until 30 Jun 2020)
8	FW	NGR	Olarenwaju Kayode (on loan at Gaziantep until 30 Jun 2020)
15	DF	UKR	Valeriy Bondarenko (on loan at Vitória until 30 Jun 2020)
23	FW	UKR	Andriy Boryachuk (on loan at Çaykur Rizespor until 30 Jun 2020)
24	MF	UKR	Vyacheslav Tankovskyi (on loan at Mariupol until 30 Jun 2020)
52	DF	UKR	Ihor Kyryukhantsev (on loan at Mariupol until 30 Jun 2020)
56	MF	UKR	Andriy Kulakov (on loan at Mariupol until 30 Jun 2020)
57	FW	UKR	Oleksiy Kaschuk (on loan at Mariupol until 30 Jun 2020)
59	MF	UKR	Oleksandr Zubkov (on loan at Ferencvárosi until 30 Jun 2020)
61	MF	UKR	Dmytro Topalov (on loan at Mariupol until 30 Jun 2020)

No.	Pos.	Nation	Player
62	DF	UKR	Danylo Sahutkin (on loan at Mariupol until 30 Jun 2020)
65	DF	UKR	Yukhym Konoplya (on loan at Desna until 30 Jun 2020)
71	MF	UKR	Maksym Chekh (on loan at Mariupol until 30 Jun 2020)
72	MF	UKR	Vyacheslav Churko (on loan at Mariupol until 30 Jun 2020)
73	MF	UKR	Danylo Ihnatenko (on loan at Mariupol until 30 Jun 2020)
75	DF	UKR	Viktor Korniyenko (on loan at Mariupol until 30 Jun 2020)
90	FW	UKR	Artem Dudik (on loan at Mariupol until 30 Jun 2020)
95	DF	UKR	Eduard Sobol (on loan at Brugge until 30 Jun 2020)
—	FW	UKR	Stanislav Biblyk (on loan at Mariupol until 30 Jun 2020)

=== Other players under the contract ===
Note: Flags indicate national team as defined under FIFA eligibility rules; some limited exceptions apply. Players may hold more than one non-FIFA nationality.

No.	Pos.	Nation	Player
15	DF	UKR	Volodymyr Hrachov
48	DF	UKR	Dmytro Shevchenko
58	MF	UKR	Andriy Korobenko
59	MF	UKR	Mykyta Adamenko
64	FW	UKR	Roman Yalovenko
68	FW	UKR	Denys Arendaruk
70	GK	UKR	Ruslan Yefanov
72	FW	UKR	Vladyslav Kuzmenko

No.	Pos.	Nation	Player
76	MF	AZE	Murad Khachayev
78	DF	UKR	Yuriy Mate
79	GK	UKR	Vladyslav Vertyey
82	GK	UKR	Yevhen Kucherenko
82	DF	UKR	Oleksandr Masalov
89	FW	BLR	Ilya Vasilevich
91	DF	UKR	Andriy Zaporoshchenko
92	MF	UKR	Maksym Andrushchenko

=== U21 team squad ===
Note: Flags indicate national team as defined under FIFA eligibility rules; some limited exceptions apply. Players may hold more than one non-FIFA nationality.

No.	Pos.	Nation	Player
56	MF	UKR	Andriy Kulakov
57	DF	UKR	Serhiy Snisar
58	FW	UKR	Edvard Kobak
59	MF	UKR	Kostyantyn Hurov
61	FW	UKR	Bohdan Dukhota
62	MF	UKR	Vladyslav Kobylyanskyi
63	MF	UKR	Klim Prykhodko
64	MF	UKR	Oleh Ocheretko
67	DF	UKR	Pavlo Shushko
68	GK	UKR	Oleksandr Kemkin
71	MF	UKR	Mykhaylo Rudavskyi
72	DF	UKR	Roman Yakuba
73	DF	UKR	Ivan Semenikhin
75	MF	UKR	Artem Bondarenko

No.	Pos.	Nation	Player
78	FW	UKR	Abdulla Abdullayev
79	FW	UKR	Bohdan Viunnyk
82	DF	UKR	Oleksandr Drambayev
83	MF	UKR	Dmytro Kryskiv
84	FW	UKR	Artem Kholod
85	MF	UKR	Kyrylo Melichenko
86	DF	UKR	Dmytro Pavlish
87	DF	UKR	Nazariy Muravskyi
88	GK	UKR	Mykyta Turbayevskyi
89	MF	UKR	Heorhiy Sudakov
91	MF	UKR	Mykhailo Mudryk
92	DF	UKR	Dmytro Avdeyev
93	GK	UKR	Tymur Puzankov
94	MF	UKR	Illya Hulko

== Transfers ==
=== In ===
Date	Position	Nationality	Name	From	Fee	Ref.
26 August 2019	FW	(Ukraine)	Vladyslav Vakula	Mariupol	Undisclosed	
2 September 2019	DF	(Brazil)	Vitão	Palmeiras	Undisclosed	
2 September 2019	MF	(Ukraine)	Yevhen Konoplyanka	Schalke 04	Undisclosed	

=== Out ===
Date	Position	Nationality	Name	To	Fee	Ref.
Summer 2019	MF	(Ukraine)	Oleksandr Hlahola	FC Mynai	Undisclosed	
17 May 2019	MF	(Ukraine)	Ivan Petryak	MOL Vidi	Undisclosed	
30 May 2019	DF	(Ukraine)	Yuriy Senytskyi	Avanhard Kramatorsk	Undisclosed	
15 June 2019	DF	(Ukraine)	Oleh Danchenko	Rubin Kazan	Undisclosed	
19 June 2019	DF	(Ukraine)	Ivan Ordets	Dynamo Moscow	Undisclosed	
20 June 2019	FW	(Ukraine)	Denys Bezborodko	Oleksandriya	Undisclosed	
27 June 2019	DF	(Ukraine)	Serhiy Vakulenko	Karpaty Lviv	Undisclosed	
17 July 2019	DF	(Ukraine)	Taras Kacharaba	Slovan Liberec	Undisclosed	
27 July 2019	FW	(Ukraine)	Vladyslav Buhay	MFC Mykolaiv	Undisclosed	
6 August 2019	FW	(Belarus)	Ilya Vasilevich	BATE Borisov	Undisclosed	
24 August 2019	FW	(Argentina)	Gustavo Leschuk	Antalyaspor	Undisclosed	
22 January 2020	MF	(Ukraine)	Andriy Totovytskyi	Desna Chernihiv	Undisclosed	
22 January 2020	FW	(Ukraine)	Vladyslav Kulach	Vorskla Poltava	Undisclosed	

=== Loans out ===
Date from	Position	Nationality	Name	To	Date to	Ref.
Summer 2019	FW	(Ukraine)	Artem Dudik	Slutsk	31 December 2019	
31 May 2019	MF	(Ukraine)	Danylo Ihnatenko	Ferencváros	31 December 2019	
31 May 2019	MF	(Ukraine)	Oleksandr Zubkov	Ferencváros		
21 June 2019	GK	(Ukraine)	Oleh Kudryk	Karpaty Lviv		
27 June 2019	DF	(Ukraine)	Viktor Korniyenko	Mariupol		
27 June 2019	MF	(Ukraine)	Maksym Chekh	Mariupol		
27 June 2019	MF	(Ukraine)	Oleksiy Kashchuk	Mariupol		
27 June 2019	MF	(Ukraine)	Dmytro Topalov	Mariupol		
28 June 2019	DF	(Ukraine)	Yukhym Konoplya	Desna Chernihiv		
28 June 2019	DF	(Ukraine)	Valeriy Bondarenko	Vitória Guimarães		
4 July 2019	DF	(Ukraine)	Danylo Sahutkin	Yenisey Krasnoyarsk		
4 July 2019	DF	(Ukraine)	Eduard Sobol	Brugge		
10 July 2019	FW	(Ukraine)	Vladyslav Kulach	Honvéd	22 January 2020	
18 July 2019	MF	(Brazil)	Wellington Nem	Fluminense	31 December 2019	
22 July 2019	DF	(Ukraine)	Serhiy Chobotenko	Mariupol		
5 August 2019	MF	(Ukraine)	Vyacheslav Tankovskyi	Mariupol		
9 August 2019	FW	(Nigeria)	Olarenwaju Kayode	Gazişehir Gaziantep		
20 August 2019	MF	(Ukraine)	Andriy Kulakov	Mariupol		
26 August 2019	FW	(Ukraine)	Vladyslav Vakula	Mariupol	31 December 2019	
2 September 2019	FW	(Brazil)	Fernando	Sporting CP	31 December 2019	
14 January 2020	FW	(Ukraine)	Artem Dudik	Mariupol		
15 January 2020	DF	(Ukraine)	Danylo Sahutkin	Mariupol		
16 January 2020	FW	(Ukraine)	Stanislav Biblyk	Mariupol		
20 January 2020	FW	(Ukraine)	Andriy Boryachuk	Çaykur Rizespor		
17 February 2020	DF	(Ukraine)	Bohdan Butko	Lech Poznań		
19 February 2020	DF	(Ukraine)	Nazariy Muravskyi	Mariupol		
19 February 2020	MF	(Ukraine)	Danylo Ihnatenko	Mariupol		

=== Released ===
Date	Position	Nationality	Name	Joined	Date
11 August 2020	MF	(Brazil)	Wellington Nem		

== Friendlies ==
26 June 2019	Ludogorets Razgrad (Bulgaria)	0 – 3	(Ukraine) Shakhtar Donetsk	Kufstein, Austria
18:00 EEST (UTC+3)	Moți (yellow card) 40'	Report	Tetê 3'; Patrick 29'; Sikan 71'; Butko (yellow card) 82'	Stadium: Kufstein Arena

30 June 2019	CSKA Sofia (Bulgaria)	0 – 1	(Ukraine) Shakhtar Donetsk	Grödig, Austria
12:00 EEST (UTC+3)		Report	Sikan 9'; Stepanenko (yellow card) 34'; Patrick (yellow card) 76'	Stadium: THE GOLDBERG Stadium

5 July 2019	Uerdingen 05 (Germany)	1 – 1	(Ukraine) Shakhtar Donetsk	Velden, Austria
13:00 EEST (UTC+3)	Beister 81'	Report	Tankovskyi (yellow card) 6'; Blanco Leschuk 62'	Stadium: Forest Arena Velden sport complex

5 July 2019	Copenhagen (Denmark)	1 – 2	(Ukraine) Shakhtar Donetsk	Wolfsberg, Austria
18:00 EEST (UTC+3)	Holse 40'	Report	Moraes 16', 21'; Khocholava (yellow card) 65'	Stadium: Lavanttal-Arena

8 July 2019	Proleter Novi Sad (Serbia)	0 – 3	(Ukraine) Shakhtar Donetsk	Poggersdorf, Austria
13:00 EEST (UTC+3)		Report	Butko 63'; Patrick 69'; Kovalenko 82' (pen.)	Stadium: Sportzentrum Poggersdorf

8 July 2019	Wolfsberger AC (Austria)	0 – 2	(Ukraine) Shakhtar Donetsk	Velden, Austria
19:00 EEST (UTC+3)		Report	Moraes 5'; Tetê 36'; Ismaily (yellow card) 81'; Khocholava (yellow card) 82'	Stadium: Forest Arena Velden sport complex

11 July 2019	APOEL (Cyprus)	1 – 0	(Ukraine) Shakhtar Donetsk	Villach, Austria
18:30 EEST (UTC+3)		Report		Stadium: Stadion Villach-Lind

19 July 2019	Shakhtar Donetsk (Ukraine)	2 – 0	(Ukraine) Kolos Kovalivka	Kyiv
18:00 EEST (UTC+3)	Fernando 22'; Sikan 65'	Report		Stadium: Olimpiysʹka Baza Svyatoshyn

20 July 2019	Shakhtar Donetsk (Ukraine)	3 – 0	(Ukraine) Olimpik Donetsk	Kyiv
18:00 EEST (UTC+3)	Patrick 26', 57'; Moraes 88'	Report		Stadium: Olimpiysʹka Baza Svyatoshyn

5 September 2019	Shakhtar Donetsk (Ukraine)	1 – 1	(Ukraine) Kolos Kovalivka	Kyiv
11:00 EEST (UTC+3)	Muravskyi 85'	Report	Lysenko 52'	Stadium: Olimpiysʹka Baza Svyatoshyn

9 October 2019	Shakhtar Donetsk (Ukraine)	2 – 0	(Ukraine) Obolon-Brovar Kyiv
10:30 EEST (UTC+3)	A.Kholod 22'; Totovytskyi 82'	Report

25 January 2020	Shakhtar Donetsk (Ukraine)	1 – 0	(Poland) Lech Poznań	Belek, Turkey
16:00 EET (UTC+2)	Kryvtsov 50'	Report		Stadium: Regnum Sports Center

26 January 2020	Shakhtar Donetsk (Ukraine)	1 – 1	(Serbia) Vojvodina	Belek, Turkey
16:30 EET (UTC+2)	Patrick 81'	Report	Bolbat 78' (o.g.)	Stadium: Susei Luxury Resort

29 January 2020	Shakhtar Donetsk (Ukraine)	0 – 1	(Serbia) Proleter Novi Sad	Belek, Turkey
09:45 EET (UTC+2)		Report	Radinović 50'

30 January 2020	Shakhtar Donetsk (Ukraine)	1 – 0	(Czech Republic) 1. FC Slovácko	Belek, Turkey
09:00 EET (UTC+2)	Kovalenko 56'	Report

5 February 2020	Shakhtar Donetsk (Ukraine)	2 – 0	(North Macedonia) Makedonija GP	Belek, Turkey
10:30 EET (UTC+2)	Tetê 13'; Fernando 44'	Report		Stadium: Regnum Sports Centre

5 February 2020	Shakhtar Donetsk (Ukraine)	2 – 2	(Denmark) SønderjyskE	Belek, Turkey
16:00 EET (UTC+2)	Taison 54'; Kovalenko 61' (pen.)	Report	Kryvtsov 28' (o.g.); Christiansen 88'	Stadium: Regnum Sports Centre

8 February 2020	Shakhtar Donetsk (Ukraine)	3 – 1	(Slovenia) Olimpija Ljubljana	Belek, Turkey
16:00 EET (UTC+2)	Alan Patrick 82'; Konoplyanka 89'; Moraes 90'	Report	Vukušić 27'	Stadium: Regnum Sports Centre

9 February 2020	Shakhtar Donetsk (Ukraine)	1 – 0	(Latvia) Ventspils	Belek, Turkey
11:00 EET (UTC+2)	Antônio 17' (pen.)	Report		Stadium: Regnum Sports Centre

24 May 2020	Shakhtar Donetsk	4 – 1	Rukh Lviv
11:00 EET (UTC+2)	Solomon 10'; Marlos 64' (pen.); Konoplyanka 72'; Moraes 85'	Report	Brikner 9'	Referee: Mykola Balakin

27 May 2020	Shakhtar Donetsk	4 – 0	Obolon-Brovar Kyiv
11:00 EET (UTC+2)	Patrick 9'; Marlos 21'; Antônio 75'; Tetê 76'	Report		Referee: Ivan Bondar

29 July 2020	Shakhtar Donetsk	2 – 0	Veres Rivne
10:30 EET (UTC+2)	Tetê 67'; Solomon 87'	Report		Referee: Ivan Bondar

== Competitions ==
Competition	Record							
Competition	G	W	D	L	GF	GA	GD	Win %
Premier League	32	26	4	2	80	26	+54	81.25
Super Cup	1	0	0	1	1	2	−1	0.00
Cup	1	0	0	1	1	2	−1	0.00
Champions League	6	1	3	2	8	12	−4	16.67
Europa League	6	4	1	1	14	11	+3	66.67
Total	46	31	8	7	102	51	+51	67.39

Updated to match played 17 August 2020
Source: Competitions

=== Ukrainian Super Cup ===
28 July 2019 Final	Shakhtar Donetsk	1 – 2	Dynamo Kyiv	Odesa
21:00 EEST (UTC+3)	Khocholava (yellow card) 29'; Patrick 45+3'	Report	Buyalskyi (yellow card) 45'; Kádár (yellow card) 72'; Burda 80'; Garmash 83'	Stadium: Chornomorets Stadium; Attendance: 27,400; Referee: Vitaliy Romanov

=== Ukrainian Premier League ===
==== Regular stage ====
===== League table =====
Pos	Team	Pld	W	D	L	GF	GA	GD	Pts	Qualification or relegation (Note: Teams play each other twice (22 matches), before the league split into two groups (the top six and the bottom six) for the last 10 matches.)
1	Shakhtar Donetsk	22	19	2	1	59	14	+45	59	Qualification for the Championship round
2	Dynamo Kyiv	22	14	3	5	44	17	+27	45	Qualification for the Championship round
3	Zorya Luhansk	22	13	4	5	39	18	+21	43	Qualification for the Championship round
4	Desna Chernihiv	22	13	3	6	36	15	+21	42	Qualification for the Championship round
5	FC Oleksandriya	22	11	4	7	30	23	+7	37	Qualification for the Championship round

Source: Ukrainian Premier League, Soccerway
Rules for classification: 1) Points; 2) Head-to-head points; 3) Head-to-head goal difference; 4) Head-to-head higher number of goals scored; 5) Goal difference; 6) Higher number of goals scored; 7) Draw or "golden match" if tied for title (Article 22, paragraph 3).

===== Results summary =====
Overall								Home						Away					
Pld	W	D	L	GF	GA	GD	Pts	W	D	L	GF	GA	GD	W	D	L	GF	GA	GD
22	19	2	1	59	14	+45	59	10	1	0	35	6	+29	9	1	1	24	8	+16

Last updated: 8 March 2020.
Source: Competitive matches

===== Results by round =====
Round	1	2	3	4	5	6	7	8	9	10	11	12	13	14	15	16	17	18	19	20	21	22
Ground	A	H	A	A	H	A	H	A	H	A	H	H	A	H	H	A	H	A	H	A	H	A
Result	W	W	W	W	W	W	W	W	W	W	W	D	W	W	W	D	W	W	W	L	W	W
Position	1	1	1	1	1	1	1	1	1	1	1	1	1	1	1	1	1	1	1	1	1	1

Updated to match(es) played on 8 March 2020. Source: Soccerway
A = Away; H = Home; W = Win; D = Draw; L = Loss

===== Results =====
31 July 2019 1	Oleksandriya	1 – 3	Shakhtar Donetsk	Oleksandriya
19:00 EEST (UTC+3)	Tretyakov 42'; Zaporozhan (yellow card) 76'	Report	Bukhal 58' (o.g.); Stepanenko (yellow card) 71'; Taison 73'; Patrick (yellow card) 86'; Dentinho 90+1'	Stadium: CSC Nika Stadium; Attendance: 4,004; Referee: Anatoliy Abdula

4 August 2019 2	Shakhtar Donetsk	3 – 0	Karpaty Lviv	Kharkiv
19:30 EEST (UTC+3)	Marlos 40'; Moraes 45'; Ismaily 63'; Patrick (yellow card) 66'	Report	Di Franco (yellow card) 38'; Kovtun (yellow card) 49'; Vojković (yellow card) 90+2'	Stadium: OSC Metalist; Attendance: 6,656; Referee: Mykola Balakin

10 August 2019 3	Dynamo Kyiv	1 – 2	Shakhtar Donetsk	Kyiv
17:00 EEST (UTC+3)	Burda (yellow card) 21'; Rodrigues 39'; Shepelyev (yellow card) 42'; Andriyevskyi (yellow card) 72' de Pena (yellow card) 90+9'	Report	Moraes 21', (yellow card) 71'; Marlos 65'; Patrick (yellow card) 78'; Dentinho (yellow card) 90+9'	Stadium: NSC Olimpiyskiy; Attendance: 41,203; Referee: Yaroslav Kozyk

18 August 2019 4	Lviv	0 – 2	Shakhtar Donetsk	Lviv
19:30 EEST (UTC+3)	Marthã (yellow card) 39'; Honchar (yellow card) 47'; Sabino (yellow card) 67'; Kvasnyi (yellow card) 90'	Report	Matviyenko (yellow card) 23'; Dentinho 31'; Marlos 37'; Stepanenko (yellow card) 59'; Marcos Antônio (yellow card) 87'	Stadium: Arena Lviv; Attendance: 6,380; Referee: Viktor Kopiyevskyi

25 August 2019 5	Shakhtar Donetsk	5 – 1	Mariupol	Kharkiv
19:30 EEST (UTC+3)	Tetê 8', 11'; Moraes 12'; Taison 62' (pen.); Marcos Antônio 83'	Report	Vakula 78'	Stadium: OSC Metalist; Attendance: 7,134; Referee: Dmytro Kutakov

1 September 2019 6	Olimpik Donetsk	0 – 4	Shakhtar Donetsk	Kyiv
17:00 EEST (UTC+3)	Zaviyskyi (yellow card) 27'; Zotko (yellow card) 53'	Report	Marlos (yellow card) 10', (goal) 60'; Moraes 13', 80'; Solomon 45+2'; Bondar (yellow card) 87'	Stadium: Lobanovsky Dynamo Stadium; Attendance: 4,500; Referee: Serhiy Boyko

14 September 2019 7	Shakhtar Donetsk	4 – 3	Zorya Luhansk	Kharkiv
17:00 EEST (UTC+3)	Taison (yellow card) 12', (goal) 42'; Marlos 53'; Moraes 61', 89'; Stepanenko (yellow card) 77'	Report	Yurchenko 10'; Mykhaylychenko (yellow card) 24'; Kocherhin 35'; Ivanisenya (yellow card) 51'; Tymchyk (yellow card) 70'; Lyednyev 86'	Stadium: OSC Metalist; Attendance: 9,260; Referee: Vitaliy Romanov

22 September 2019 8	Desna Chernihiv	0 – 1	Shakhtar Donetsk	Chernihiv
14:00 EEST (UTC+3)	Bohdanov (yellow card) 88'	Report	Marlos 22'; Taison (yellow card) 53'; Moraes (yellow card) 64'; Bolbat (yellow card) 90'	Stadium: Stadion Yuri Gagarin; Attendance: 5,500; Referee: Kateryna Monzul

27 September 2019 9	Shakhtar Donetsk	4 – 0	Vorskla Poltava	Kharkiv
19:00 EEST (UTC+3)	Bondar 32'; Konoplyanka 50' (pen.); Patrick 72'; Moraes 77'	Report	Artur (yellow card) 5'; Bayenko (yellow card) 55'	Stadium: OSC Metalist; Attendance: 4,638; Referee: Yevhen Aranovskyi

6 October 2019 10	Dnipro-1	0 – 2	Shakhtar Donetsk	Dnipro
14:00 EEST (UTC+3)	Vakulko (yellow card) 26'; Kohut (yellow card) 74'; Polyovyi (yellow card) 90'	Report	Moraes 4' (yellow card) 67'; Stepanenko (yellow card) 33'; Taison (yellow card) 57' (goal) 83'	Stadium: Dnipro-Arena; Attendance: 9,982; Referee: Igor Paskhal

19 October 2019 11	Shakhtar Donetsk	6 – 0	Kolos Kovalivka	Kharkiv
19:00 EEST (UTC+3)	Moraes 5', 61'; Konoplyanka 26'; Dodô 32'; Taison 43', 45'; Cipriano (yellow card) 62'; Bondar (yellow card) 64'; Antônio (yellow card) 70'	Report	Chornomorets (yellow card) 49'; Milko (yellow card) 57'	Stadium: OSC Metalist; Attendance: 5,562; Referee: Yaroslav Kozyk

27 October 2019 12	Shakhtar Donetsk	0 – 0	Oleksandriya	Kharkiv
17:00 EET (UTC+2)	Tetê (yellow card) 53'; Stepanenko (yellow card) 58'; Patrick (red card) 75'; Khocholava (yellow card) 82'	Report	Hrechyshkin (yellow card) 45'; Banada (yellow card) 75'; Shastal (yellow card) 77' (yellow-red card) 84'; Babohlo (yellow card) 78'; Dovhyi (yellow card) 89'	Stadium: OSC Metalist; Attendance: 5,741; Referee: Vitaliy Romanov

2 November 2019 13	Karpaty Lviv	0 – 3	Shakhtar Donetsk	Lviv
14:00 EET (UTC+2)	Ponde (yellow card) 51'	Report	Boryachuk 10'; Kovalenko 58'; Tetê 65'	Stadium: Ukraina Stadium; Attendance: 5,123; Referee: Ihor Paskhal

10 November 2019 14	Shakhtar Donetsk	1 – 0	Dynamo Kyiv	Kharkiv
17:00 EET (UTC+2)	Kryvtsov 17'; Kovalenko (yellow card) 60'; Dentinho (yellow card) 64'; Dodô (yellow card) 64'; Taison (red card) 82'	Report	Popov (yellow card) 9'; Shabanov (yellow card) 16'; Rodrigues (yellow card) 50'; Mykolenko (yellow card) 56'	Stadium: OSC Metalist; Attendance: 21,907; Referee: Mykola Balakin

22 November 2019 15	Shakhtar Donetsk	4 – 1	Lviv	Kharkiv
19:00 EET (UTC+2)	Moraes 11', 53', 77' (pen.) (yellow card) 78'; Stepanenko (yellow card) 24'; Patrick 85' (yellow card) 87'	Report	Bratkov (yellow card) 19'; Tatarkov 25'; Bandura (yellow card) 70'; Sabino (yellow card) 75'; Alvaro (yellow card) 86'	Stadium: OSC Metalist; Attendance: 2,458; Referee: Dmytro Kryvushkin

1 December 2019 16	Mariupol	1 – 1	Shakhtar Donetsk	Mariupol
14:00 EET (UTC+2)	Polehenko (yellow card) 14'; Dawa (yellow card) 18'; Putrya 49'; Peterman (yellow card) 78'	Report	Taison 15' (pen.); Ismaily (yellow card) 31'; Antônio (yellow card) 59'; Khocholava (yellow card) 71'	Stadium: Volodymyr Boiko Stadium; Attendance: 8,425; Referee: Anatoliy Abdula

6 December 2019 17	Shakhtar Donetsk	3 – 0	Olimpik Donetsk	Kharkiv
19:00 EET (UTC+2)	Matviyenko 4'; Marlos 77'; Ismaily 90+1'; Taison (yellow card) 90+5'	Report	Ksyonz (yellow card) 13'; Politylo (yellow card) 90+5'	Stadium: OSC Metalist; Attendance: 2,372; Referee: Dmytro Bondarenko

14 December 2019 18	Zorya Luhansk	1 – 2	Shakhtar Donetsk	Zaporizhia
17:00 EET (UTC+2)	Mykhaylychenko (yellow card) 3'; Abu Hanna (yellow card) 50'; Lyednyev (yellow card) 58' (goal) 61'; Ivanisenya (yellow card) 84'; Tymchyk (yellow card) 90'	Report	Marlos (yellow card) 12' (goal) 84' (pen.); Patrick (yellow card) 47'; Moraes 54' (yellow card) 72'	Stadium: Slavutych-Arena; Attendance: 5,317; Referee: Vitaliy Romanov

23 February 2020 19	Shakhtar Donetsk	1 – 0	Desna Chernihiv	Kharkiv
17:00 EET (UTC+2)	Marlos 90+4'	Report	Kartushov (yellow card) 19'; Totovytskyi (yellow card) 52'; Dombrovskyi (yellow card) 90+1'; Mostovyi (yellow card) 90+6'	Stadium: OSC Metalist; Attendance: 3,469; Referee: Yevhen Aranovskyi

1 March 2020 20	Vorskla Poltava	1 – 0	Shakhtar Donetsk	Poltava
17:00 EET (UTC+2)	Stepanyuk 30', (yellow card) 59'; Sklyar (yellow card) 55' (yellow-red card) 84'; Perduta (yellow card) 63'; Puclin (yellow card) 73'; Yakubu (yellow card) 78'; Luizão (yellow card) 88'; Kane (yellow card) 90'	Report	Tetê (yellow card) 36'; Kryvtsov (yellow card) 50'; Cipriano (yellow card) 51'; Marlos (yellow card) 86'; Dodô (yellow card) 90'; Dentinho (yellow card) 90+1'	Stadium: Oleksiy Butovsky Vorskla Stadium; Attendance: 8,776; Referee: Ihor Paskhal

4 March 2020 21	Shakhtar Donetsk	4 – 1	Dnipro-1	Kharkiv
19:00 EET (UTC+2)	Kryvtsov 4'; Moraes 9'; Taison 19'; Konoplyanka 23'; Bondar (yellow card) 81'	Report	Lohinov (yellow card) 22'; Di Franco (yellow card) 33'; Nazarenko (yellow card) 55'; Shapoval (yellow card) 67'; Supriaha 82' (pen.)	Stadium: OSC Metalist; Attendance: 5,319; Referee: Serhiy Boyko

8 March 2020 22	Kolos Kovalivka	3 – 4	Shakhtar Donetsk	Kyiv
17:00 EET (UTC+2)	Petrov (yellow card) 11'; Yemets (yellow card) 31'; Yefremov (yellow card) 33'; Milko 37', 76', (yellow card) 56'; Havrysh 67' (pen.)	Report	Taison 12' (pen.); Moraes 31', 81', (yellow card) 41'; Tetê (yellow card) 45+1', (goal) 60'; Kryvtsov (yellow card) 66'; Marcos Antônio (yellow card) 85' (yellow-red card) 90+5'; Ismaily (yellow card) 90+4'	Stadium: Obolon Arena; Attendance: 3,950; Referee: Yaroslav Kozyk

==== Championship stage ====
===== Results summary =====
Overall								Home						Away					
Pld	W	D	L	GF	GA	GD	Pts	W	D	L	GF	GA	GD	W	D	L	GF	GA	GD
10	7	2	1	21	12	+9	23	4	1	0	11	5	+6	3	1	1	10	7	+3

Last updated: 19 July 2020.
Source: See Results

===== Results by round =====
Round	1	2	3	4	5	6	7	8	9	10
Ground	A	H	H	A	H	H	A	H	H	A
Result	L	W	W	W	W	D	W	W	W	D
Position	1	1	1	1	1	1	1	1	1	1

Updated to match(es) played on 19 July 2020. Source: See results
A = Away; H = Home; W = Win; D = Draw; L = Loss

===== Results =====
15 March 2020 1	Zorya Luhansk	1 – 0	Shakhtar Donetsk	Zaporizhia
14:00 EET (UTC+2)	Ivanisenya (yellow card) 14'; Kocherhin (yellow card) 34'; Cvek (yellow card) 59'; Mykhaylychenko (yellow card) 75', (goal) 83'	Report	Moraes (yellow card) 51'	Stadium: Slavutych-Arena; Attendance: 0 Referee: Anatoliy Abdula
Note: Match was played behind closed doors due to quarantine in precautions Ukraine during COVID-19 pandemic.

31 May 2020 2	Shakhtar Donetsk	3 – 1	Dynamo Kyiv	Kharkiv
17:00 EET (UTC+2)	Ismaily (yellow card) 24'; Marlos 39', 67'; Kovalenko (yellow card) 46'; Antônio 74'	Report	Popov (yellow card) 22'; Buyalskyi 38'	Stadium: OSC Metalist; Attendance: 0 Referee: Kateryna Monzul
Note: Match was originally scheduled for 22 March 2020, before being postponed due to the COVID-19 pandemic. Match was played behind closed doors due to quarantine in precautions Ukraine during COVID-19 pandemic.

6 June 2020 3	Shakhtar Donetsk	3 – 2	Desna Chernihiv	Kharkiv
17:00 EEST (UTC+3)	Fernando 4'; Marlos 25', 51'; Matviyenko (yellow card) 31'; Antônio (yellow card) 87'	Report	Dombrovskyi (yellow card) 28'; Favorov 32' (pen.); Kalitvintsev (yellow card) 82'; Budkivskyi (yellow card) 84' (goal) 88'	Stadium: OSC Metalist; Attendance: 0 Referee: Serhiy Boyko
Note: Match was originally scheduled for 3 April 2020, before being postponed due to the COVID-19 pandemic. Match was played behind closed doors due to quarantine precautions in Ukraine during COVID-19 pandemic.

14 June 2020 4	Kolos Kovalivka	0 – 1	Shakhtar Donetsk	Kyiv
17:00 EEST (UTC+3)	Ilyin (yellow card) 56'	Report	Moraes 48'; Patrick (yellow card) 84'	Stadium: Obolon Arena; Attendance: 0 Referee: Viktor Kopievskyi
Note: Match was originally scheduled for 10 April 2020, before being postponed due to the COVID-19 pandemic. Match was played behind closed doors due to quarantine precautions in Ukraine during COVID-19 pandemic.

20 June 2020 5	Shakhtar Donetsk	3 – 2	Oleksandriya	Kharkiv
19:30 EEST (UTC+3)	Taison 13' (pen.); Dodô (yellow card) 45'; Tetê 60', 78'	Report	Shendrik (yellow card) 12'; Banada 48'; Tretyakov 51' (pen.); Pashayev (yellow card) 59'; Shastal (yellow card) 65'	Stadium: OSC Metalist; Attendance: 0 Referee: Ihor Paskhal
Note: Match was originally scheduled for 17 April 2020, before being postponed due to the COVID-19 pandemic. Match was played behind closed doors due to quarantine precautions in Ukraine during COVID-19 pandemic.

27 June 2020 6	Shakhtar Donetsk	0 – 0	Zorya Luhansk	Kharkiv
19:30 EEST (UTC+3)	Tetê (yellow card) 58'	Report		Stadium: OSC Metalist; Attendance: 0 Referee: Vitaliy Romanov
Note: Match was originally scheduled for 21 April 2020, before being postponed due to the COVID-19 pandemic. Match was played behind closed doors due to quarantine precautions in Ukraine during COVID-19 pandemic.

4 July 2020 7	Dynamo Kyiv	2 – 3	Shakhtar Donetsk	Kyiv
19:30 EEST (UTC+3)	Verbič 51'; Kadiri (yellow card) 63'; De Pena 67'; Pivarić (red card) 90+1'	Report	Solomon (yellow card) 17'; Stepanenko 31' (yellow card) 61'; Konoplyanka 39'; Bolbat (yellow card) 42'; Patrick 72'	Stadium: NSC Olimpiyskiy; Attendance: 0 Referee: Vitaliy Romanov
Note: Match was originally scheduled for 24 April 2020, before being postponed due to the COVID-19 pandemic. Match was played behind closed doors due to quarantine precautions in Ukraine during COVID-19 pandemic.

12 July 2020 8	Desna Chernihiv	2 – 4	Shakhtar Donetsk	Chernihiv
19:30 EEST (UTC+3)	Hitchenko 29'; Filippov 62'; Mostovoy (yellow card) 71'	Report	Solomon 25'; Tetê 26'; Maycon 60'; Patrick 69' (pen.)	Stadium: Chernihiv Stadium; Attendance: 0 Referee: Anatoliy Abdula
Note: Match was originally scheduled for 1 May 2020, before being postponed due to the COVID-19 pandemic. Match was played behind closed doors due to quarantine precautions in Ukraine during COVID-19 pandemic.

15 July 2020 9	Shakhtar Donetsk	2 – 0	Kolos Kovalivka	Kharkiv
19:00 EEST (UTC+3)	Cipriano 49'; Khocholava (yellow card) 70'; Moraes (yellow card) 81' (goal) 90+4'	Report	Antyukh (yellow card) 60'; Sorokin (yellow card) 78'	Stadium: OSC Metalist; Attendance: 0 Referee: Oleksandr Shandor
Note: Match was originally scheduled for 8 May 2020, before being postponed due to the COVID-19 pandemic. Match was played behind closed doors due to quarantine precautions in Ukraine during COVID-19 pandemic.

19 July 2020 10	Oleksandriya	2 – 2	Shakhtar Donetsk	Oleksandriya
19:30 EEST (UTC+3)	Bezborodko (yellow card) 58'; Dovhyi 89'; Banada 90'	Report	Sikan (yellow card) 21'; Tetê 24'; Solomon 32'; Dentinho (yellow card) 83'; Mudryk (yellow card) 85'	Stadium: CSC Nika Stadium; Attendance: 0 Referee: Dmytro Bondarenko
Note: Match was originally scheduled for 15 May 2020, before being postponed due to the COVID-19 pandemic. Match was played behind closed doors due to quarantine precautions in Ukraine during COVID-19 pandemic.

===== League table =====
Pos	Team	Pld	W	D	L	GF	GA	GD	Pts	Qualification or relegation
1	Shakhtar Donetsk (C)	32	26	4	2	80	26	+54	82	Qualification for the Champions League group stage
2	Dynamo Kyiv	32	18	5	9	65	35	+30	59	Qualification for the Champions League third qualifying round
3	Zorya Luhansk	32	17	7	8	50	29	+21	58	Qualification for the Europa League group stage
4	Desna Chernihiv	32	17	5	10	59	33	+26	56	Qualification for the Europa League third qualifying round
5	FC Oleksandriya	32	14	7	11	49	47	+2	49	Qualification for the playoff for Europa League second qualifying round

Source: Ukrainian Premier League, UEFA, Soccerway
Rules for classification: 1) Points; 2) Head-to-head points; 3) Head-to-head goal difference; 4) Head-to-head higher number of goals scored; 5) Goal difference; 6) Higher number of goals scored; 7) Draw or "golden match" if tied for title (Article 22, paragraph 3).
(C) Champions

=== Ukrainian Cup ===
30 October 2019 Round of 16	Dynamo Kyiv	2 – 1 (a.e.t.)	Shakhtar Donetsk	Kyiv
19:30 EEST (UTC+3)	Sydorchuk 22' (yellow card) 89'; Mykolenko (yellow card) 71'; Kędziora (yellow card) 74'; Shepelyev (red card) 89'; Popov 110' de Pena (yellow card) 118'; Shabanov (yellow card) 120'	Report	Stepanenko (yellow card) 10' (yellow-red card) 94' (goal) 90+2'; Dentinho (yellow card) 109'; Taison (yellow card) 120'	Stadium: Olimpiyskiy National Sports Complex; Attendance: 34,865; Referee: V.Kopievskyi

=== UEFA Champions League ===
==== Group stage ====
Pos	Team	Pld	W	D	L	GF	GA	GD	Pts	Qualification
1	(England) Manchester City	6	4	2	0	16	4	+12	14	Advance to knockout phase
2	(Italy) Atalanta	6	2	1	3	8	12	−4	7	Advance to knockout phase
3	(Ukraine) Shakhtar Donetsk	6	1	3	2	8	13	−5	6	Transfer to Europa League
4	(Croatia) Dinamo Zagreb	6	1	2	3	10	13	−3	5	

Source: UEFA

18 September 2019 1	Shakhtar Donetsk (Ukraine)	0–3	(England) Manchester City	Kharkiv, Ukraine
22:00 EEST (UTC+3)		Report	Mahrez 24'; Rodrigo (yellow card) 29'; Gündoğan 38'; Gabriel Jesus 76'	Stadium: Metalist Stadium; Attendance: 36,675; Referee: Artur Soares Dias (Portugal)
Note: Match played at the Metalist Stadium in Kharkiv instead of Shakhtar Donetsk's regular Donbas Arena in Donetsk, due to the war in Donbas.

1 October 2019 2	Atalanta (Italy)	1–2	(Ukraine) Shakhtar Donetsk	Milan, Italy
19:55 EEST (UTC+3)	Zapata 28'; Iličić (yellow card) 44'; De Roon (yellow card) 49'; Toloi (yellow card) 80'; Malinovskyi (yellow card) 90+2'	Report	Kryvtsov (yellow card) 15'; Stepanenko (yellow card) 35'; Moraes 41', (yellow card) 45'; Bolbat (yellow card) 64'; Solomon 90+5'	Stadium: San Siro; Attendance: 26,022; Referee: Tobias Stieler (Germany)

22 October 2019 3	Shakhtar Donetsk (Ukraine)	2–2	(Croatia) Dinamo Zagreb	Kharkiv, Ukraine
19:55 EEST (UTC+3)	Konoplyanka 16'; Patrick (yellow card) 40'; Pyatov (yellow card) 58'; Bolbat (yellow card) 59'; Dodô 75'	Report	Stojanović (yellow card) 7'; Perić (yellow card) 23'; Olmo 25'; Oršić 60' (pen.); Dilaver (yellow card) 63'; Ademi (yellow card) 64'	Stadium: Metalist Stadium; Attendance: 21,526; Referee: Antonio Mateu Lahoz (Spain)
Note: Match played at the Metalist Stadium in Kharkiv instead of Shakhtar Donetsk's regular Donbas Arena in Donetsk, due to the war in Donbas.

6 November 2019 4	Dinamo Zagreb (Croatia)	3–3	(Ukraine) Shakhtar Donetsk	Zagreb, Croatia
21:00 EET (UTC+2)	Petković 25'; Dilaver (yellow card) 34'; Moro (yellow card) 41' (yellow-red card) 74'; Ivanušec 83'; Ademi 89' (yellow card) 90+4'; Théophile-Catherine (yellow card) 90+7'	Report	Patrick 13'; Marlos (yellow card) 41' (yellow-red card) 79'; Moraes 90+3'; Tetê 90+8' (pen.)	Stadium: Stadion Maksimir; Attendance: 28,316; Referee: Felix Brych (Germany)

26 November 2019 5	Manchester City (England)	1–1	(Ukraine) Shakhtar Donetsk	Manchester, England
21:00 EET (UTC+2)	Gündoğan 56'; Fernandinho (yellow card) 90+1'	Report	Solomon 69'	Stadium: City of Manchester Stadium; Attendance: 52,020; Referee: Slavko Vinčić (Slovenia)

11 December 2019 6	Shakhtar Donetsk (Ukraine)	0–3	(Italy) Atalanta	Kharkiv, Ukraine
19:55 EET (UTC+2)	Patrick (yellow card) 50'; Dodô (yellow card) 63' (red card) 77'	Report	Muriel (yellow card) 23'; Castagne 66'; Freuler (yellow card) 75'; Pašalić 80'; Hateboer (yellow card) 90+1'; Gosens 90+4'	Stadium: Metalist Stadium; Attendance: 26,536; Referee: Felix Zwayer (Germany)
Note: Match played at the Metalist Stadium in Kharkiv instead of Shakhtar Donetsk's regular Donbas Arena in Donetsk, due to the war in Donbas.

=== UEFA Europa League ===
==== Knockout phase ====
20 February 2020 Round of 32 1st leg	Shakhtar Donetsk (Ukraine)	2–1	(Portugal) Benfica	Kharkiv, Ukraine
22:00 EET (UTC+2)	Patrick 56'; Kovalenko 72'	Report	Pizzi 66' (pen.); Florentino (yellow card) 90+5'	Stadium: Metalist Stadium; Attendance: 24,429; Referee: Bobby Madden (Scotland)
Note: Match was played at the Metalist Stadium in Kharkiv instead of Shakhtar Donetsk's regular Donbas Arena in Donetsk, due to the war in Donbas.

27 February 2020 Round of 32 2nd leg	Benfica (Portugal)	3–3 (4–5 agg.)	(Ukraine) Shakhtar Donetsk	Lisbon, Portugal
22:00 EET (UTC+2)	Pizzi 9'; Dias 36'; Silva 47' (yellow card) 50'	Report	Dias 12' (o.g.); Ismaily (yellow card) 43'; Stepanenko 49'; Patrick 71'; Taison (yellow card) 83'; Konoplyanka (yellow card) 87'	Stadium: Estádio da Luz; Attendance: 48,302; Referee: Björn Kuipers (Netherlands)

12 March 2020 Round of 16 1st leg	VfL Wolfsburg (Germany)	1–2	(Ukraine) Shakhtar Donetsk	Wolfsburg, Germany
22:00 EET (UTC+2)	Weghorst (yellow card) 18' (penalty missed) 45+2'; Brooks 48', (yellow card) 71'; Steffen (yellow card) 56'	Report	Moraes 17'; Kovalenko (penalty missed) 22'; Antônio 73'	Stadium: Volkswagen Arena; Attendance: 0 Referee: Damir Skomina (Slovenia)
Note: Match was played behind closed doors due to an outbreak of COVID-19 in Germany.

5 August 2020 Round of 16 2nd leg	Shakhtar Donetsk (Ukraine)	3–0 (5–1 agg.)	(Germany) VfL Wolfsburg	Kyiv, Ukraine
19:55 EEST (UTC+3)	Kryvtsov (yellow card) 59'; Khocholava (red card) 68'; Moraes 89', 90+3'; Solomon 90+1'	Report	Brooks (yellow card) 57' (yellow-red card) 70'; Schlager (yellow card) 71'; Arnold (yellow card) 87'	Stadium: NSC Olimpiyskiy Stadium; Attendance: 0 Referee: Ivan Kružliak (Slovakia)
Note: The Match was originally scheduled to be played at Metalist Stadium, Kharkiv, prior to the suspension of the tournament, but was later moved to NSC Olimpiyskiy Stadium, Kyiv. Match was postponed in March due to a pandemic of COVID-19 in Europe, and later rescheduled on 17 June. Match was played behind closed doors due to the COVID-19 pandemic in Ukraine.

11 August 2020 Quarter-finals	Shakhtar Donetsk (Ukraine)	4–1	(Switzerland) Basel	Gelsenkirchen, Germany
22:00 EEST (UTC+3)	Moraes 2'; Taison 22'; Patrick (yellow card) 53' (goal) 75' (pen.); Bondar (yellow card) 87'; Dodô 88'	Report	Frei (yellow card) 26'; Arthur (yellow card) 64'; Van Wolfswinkel 90+2'	Stadium: Arena AufSchalke; Attendance: 0 Referee: Michael Oliver (England)
Note: Match was played behind closed doors due to the COVID-19 pandemic in Germany.

17 August 2020 Semi-finals	Inter Milan (Italy)	5–0	(Ukraine) Shakhtar Donetsk	Düsseldorf, Germany
22:00 EEST (UTC+3)	Martínez 19', 74'; D'Ambrosio 64'; Lukaku 78', 84'	Report	Taison (yellow card) 58'	Stadium: Merkur Spiel-Arena; Attendance: 0 Referee: Szymon Marciniak (Poland)
Note: Match was played behind closed doors due to the COVID-19 pandemic in Germany.

== Squad statistics ==
As of match played 17 August 2020

=== Appearances and goals ===
No.	Pos	Nat	Player	Total		Premier League		Ukrainian Cup		Supercup		UEFA Champions League		UEFA Europa League	
No.	Pos	Nat	Player	Apps	Goals	Apps	Goals	Apps	Goals	Apps	Goals	Apps	Goals	Apps	Goals
1	GK	(Ukraine) UKR	Oleksiy Shevchenko	2	0	2	0	0	0	0	0	0	0	0	0
4	DF	(Ukraine) UKR	Serhiy Kryvtsov	37	2	23	2	1	0	1	0	6	0	6	0
5	DF	(Georgia (country)) GEO	Davit Khocholava	16	0	8+2	0	0+1	0	1	0	0	0	2+2	0
6	MF	(Ukraine) UKR	Taras Stepanenko	37	3	24	1	1	1	1	0	6	0	5	1
7	MF	(Brazil) BRA	Taison	38	11	21+4	10	1	0	1	0	5	0	6	1
8	MF	(Brazil) BRA	Marcos Antônio	31	3	14+7	2	0+1	0	0	0	0+3	0	5+1	1
9	MF	(Brazil) BRA	Dentinho	15	2	4+7	2	0+1	0	0+1	0	0+2	0	0	0
10	FW	(Ukraine) UKR	Júnior Moraes	42	26	23+5	20	1	0	1	0	6	2	6	4
11	MF	(Ukraine) UKR	Marlos	35	13	17+6	13	1	0	1	0	4+1	0	5	0
14	MF	(Brazil) BRA	Tetê	34	9	19+7	8	0	0	0+1	0	2+1	1	1+3	0
15	MF	(Ukraine) UKR	Yevhen Konoplyanka	29	5	14+6	4	1	0	0	0	2+2	1	0+4	0
19	MF	(Israel) ISR	Manor Solomon	29	6	10+10	3	0	0	1	0	1+4	2	0+3	1
20	MF	(Ukraine) UKR	Viktor Kovalenko	27	2	7+10	1	1	0	0	0	4+1	0	2+2	1
21	MF	(Brazil) BRA	Alan Patrick	38	9	22+3	4	0	0	1	1	6	1	6	3
22	DF	(Ukraine) UKR	Mykola Matviyenko	39	1	24+2	1	1	0	0	0	6	0	6	0
23	FW	(Ukraine) UKR	Vladyslav Vakula	2	0	1+1	0	0	0	0	0	0	0	0	0
27	MF	(Brazil) BRA	Maycon	12	1	6+4	1	0	0	0	0	0	0	0+2	0
28	MF	(Brazil) BRA	Marquinhos Cipriano	12	1	9+3	1	0	0	0	0	0	0	0	0
30	GK	(Ukraine) UKR	Andriy Pyatov	37	0	23	0	1	0	1	0	6	0	6	0
31	DF	(Brazil) BRA	Ismaily	32	2	20+1	2	1	0	1	0	6	0	3	0
45	FW	(Ukraine) UKR	Danylo Sikan	8	0	3+4	0	0	0	0	0	0+1	0	0	0
49	DF	(Brazil) BRA	Vitão	4	0	3+1	0	0	0	0	0	0	0	0	0
50	MF	(Ukraine) UKR	Serhiy Bolbat	23	0	13+4	0	1	0	1	0	3	0	1	0
75	MF	(Ukraine) UKR	Artem Bondarenko	5	0	1+4	0	0	0	0	0	0	0	0	0
76	MF	(Ukraine) UKR	Oleksandr Pikhalyonok	5	0	2+3	0	0	0	0	0	0	0	0	0
77	DF	(Ukraine) UKR	Valeriy Bondar	12	1	7+4	1	0	0	0	0	0	0	1	0
81	GK	(Ukraine) UKR	Anatoliy Trubin	7	0	7	0	0	0	0	0	0	0	0	0
91	MF	(Ukraine) UKR	Mykhailo Mudryk	3	0	1+2	0	0	0	0	0	0	0	0	0
98	DF	(Brazil) BRA	Dodô	34	3	20+3	1	0+1	0	0	0	3+2	1	5	1
99	FW	(Brazil) BRA	Fernando	10	1	3+6	1	0	0	0	0	0	0	0+1	0
Players away on loan:
23	FW	(Ukraine) UKR	Andriy Boryachuk	3	1	1+2	1	0	0	0	0	0	0	0	0
Players who left Shakhtar Donetsk during the season:
15	FW	(Argentina) ARG	Gustavo Leschuk	2	0	0+2	0	0	0	0	0	0	0	0	0

=== Goalscorers ===
Place	Position	Nation	Number	Name	Premier League	Ukrainian Cup	Super Cup	Champions League	Europa League	Total
1	FW	(Ukraine)	10	Júnior Moraes	20	0	0	2	4	26
2	MF	(Ukraine)	11	Marlos	13	0	0	0	0	13
3	MF	(Ukraine)	7	Taison	10	0	0	0	1	11
4	MF	(Brazil)	14	Tetê	8	0	0	1	0	9
5	MF	(Brazil)	21	Alan Patrick	4	0	1	1	3	9
6	MF	(Israel)	19	Manor Solomon	3	0	0	2	1	6
7	MF	(Ukraine)	15	Yevhen Konoplyanka	4	0	0	1	0	5
8	MF	(Brazil)	8	Marcos Antônio	2	0	0	0	1	3
8	MF	(Ukraine)	6	Taras Stepanenko	1	1	0	0	1	3
8	DF	(Brazil)	98	Dodô	1	0	0	1	1	3
11	MF	(Brazil)	9	Dentinho	2	0	0	0	0	2
11	DF	(Brazil)	31	Ismaily	2	0	0	0	0	2
11	DF	(Ukraine)	4	Serhiy Kryvtsov	2	0	0	0	0	2
11	MF	(Ukraine)	20	Viktor Kovalenko	1	0	0	0	1	2
11				Own goal	1	0	0	0	1	2
16	DF	(Ukraine)	77	Valeriy Bondar	1	0	0	0	0	1
16	FW	(Ukraine)	23	Andriy Boryachuk	1	0	0	0	0	1
16	DF	(Ukraine)	22	Mykola Matviyenko	1	0	0	0	0	1
16	FW	(Brazil)	99	Fernando	1	0	0	0	0	1
16	MF	(Brazil)	27	Maycon	1	0	0	0	0	1
16	MF	(Brazil)	28	Marquinhos Cipriano	1	0	0	0	0	1
TOTALS					79	1	1	8	14	103

=== Clean sheets ===
Place	Position	Nation	Number	Name	Premier League	Ukrainian Cup	Champions League	Super Cup	Total
1	GK	(Ukraine)	30	Andriy Pyatov	11	0	0	1	12
2	GK	(Ukraine)	81	Anatoliy Trubin	3	0	0	0	3
3	GK	(Ukraine)	1	Oleksiy Shevchenko	1	0	0	0	1
TOTALS					15	0	0	1	16

=== Disciplinary record ===
Number	Nation	Position	Name	Premier League		Ukrainian Cup		Super Cup		Champions League		Europa League		Total	
Number	Nation	Position	Name	Yellow card	Red card	Yellow card	Red card	Yellow card	Red card	Yellow card	Red card	Yellow card	Red card	Yellow card	Red card
4	(Ukraine)	DF	Serhiy Kryvtsov	2	0	0	0	0	0	1	0	1	0	4	0
5	(Georgia (country))	DF	Davit Khocholava	3	0	0	0	1	0	0	0	0	1	4	1
6	(Ukraine)	MF	Taras Stepanenko	7	0	2	0	0	0	1	1	0	0	10	1
7	(Brazil)	MF	Taison	4	1	1	0	0	0	0	0	2	0	7	1
8	(Brazil)	MF	Marcos Antônio	6	1	0	0	0	0	0	0	0	0	6	1
9	(Brazil)	MF	Dentinho	4	0	1	0	0	0	0	0	0	0	5	0
10	(Ukraine)	FW	Júnior Moraes	8	0	0	0	0	0	1	0	0	0	9	0
11	(Ukraine)	MF	Marlos	3	0	0	0	0	0	2	1	0	0	5	1
14	(Brazil)	MF	Tetê	4	0	0	0	0	0	0	0	0	0	4	0
15	(Ukraine)	MF	Yevhen Konoplyanka	0	0	0	0	0	0	0	0	1	0	1	0
19	(Israel)	MF	Manor Solomon	1	0	0	0	0	0	0	0	0	0	1	0
20	(Ukraine)	MF	Viktor Kovalenko	2	0	1	0	0	0	0	0	0	0	3	0
21	(Brazil)	MF	Alan Patrick	6	1	0	0	0	0	2	0	1	0	9	1
22	(Ukraine)	DF	Mykola Matviyenko	2	0	0	0	0	0	0	0	0	0	2	0
28	(Brazil)	MF	Marquinhos Cipriano	2	0	0	0	0	0	0	0	0	0	2	0
30	(Ukraine)	GK	Andriy Pyatov	0	0	0	0	0	0	1	0	0	0	1	0
31	(Brazil)	DF	Ismaily	3	0	0	0	0	0	0	0	1	0	4	0
45	(Ukraine)	FW	Danylo Sikan	1	0	0	0	0	0	0	0	0	0	1	0
50	(Ukraine)	MF	Serhiy Bolbat	2	0	0	0	0	0	2	0	0	0	4	0
77	(Ukraine)	DF	Valeriy Bondar	3	0	0	0	0	0	0	0	1	0	4	0
91	(Ukraine)	MF	Mykhailo Mudryk	1	0	0	0	0	0	0	0	0	0	1	0
98	(Brazil)	DF	Dodô	3	0	0	0	0	0	1	1	0	0	4	1
Players away on loan:
Players who left Shakhtar Donetsk during the season:
			TOTALS	67	3	5	1	1	0	11	2	7	1	91	7
