= 2018–19 FC Shakhtar Donetsk season =

Shakhtar Donetsk
2018–19 season
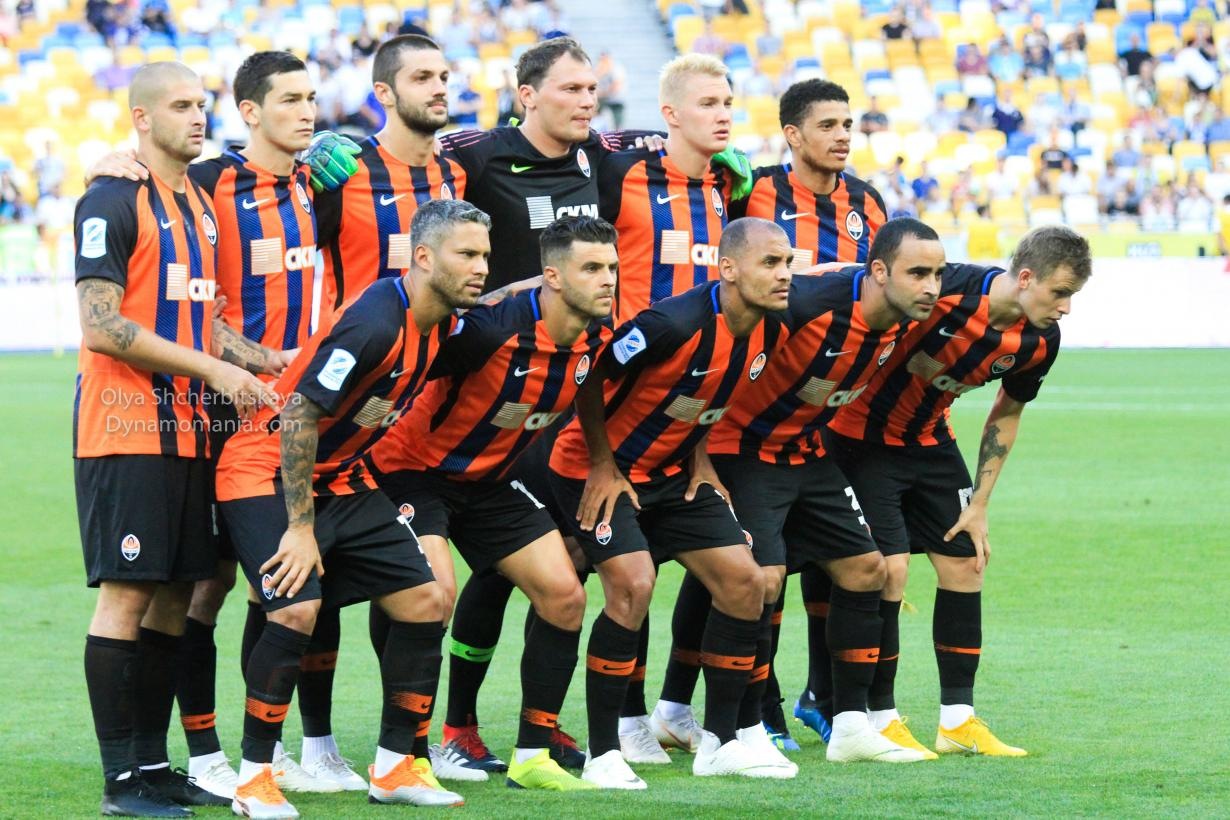
- Chairman: Rinat Akhmetov
- Manager: Paulo Fonseca
- Stadium: OSC Metalist
- Premier League: 1st
- Ukrainian Cup: Winners
- Ukrainian Super Cup: Runners-up
- UEFA Champions League: Group stage
- UEFA Europa League: Round of 32
- Top goalscorer: League: Júnior Moraes (19); All: Júnior Moraes (26)
- Highest home attendance: 38,916 vs Lyon
- Lowest home attendance: 2,137 vs Olimpik
- Average home league attendance: 7,470
Home colours	Away colours	Third colours

The 2018–19 Shakhtar Donetsk season was the club's 28th season.

== Season events ==
On 20 June, Shakhtar announced that they had extended their contract with Ismaily until the summer of 2023.

On 29 November, Shakhtar announced that they had extended their contract with Marlos until the end of 2021.

== Squad ==
As of match played 30 May 2019

Number	Name	Nationality	Position	Date of birth (age)	Signed from	Signed in	Contract ends	Apps.	Goals
Goalkeepers
1	Oleksiy Shevchenko	(Ukraine)	GK	24 February 1992 (aged 27)	Karpaty Lviv	2018		5	0
30	Andriy Pyatov	(Ukraine)	GK	28 June 1984 (aged 34)	Vorskla Poltava	2007		423	0
55	Oleh Kudryk	(Ukraine)	GK	17 October 1996 (aged 22)	Lviv	2011		2	0
68	Anatoliy Trubin	(Ukraine)	GK	1 August 2001 (aged 17)	Academy	2018		1	0
Defenders
2	Bohdan Butko	(Ukraine)	DF	13 January 1991 (aged 28)	Academy	2008		64	1
4	Serhiy Kryvtsov	(Ukraine)	DF	15 March 1991 (aged 28)	Metalurh Zaporizhzhia	2010	2021	143	11
5	Davit Khocholava	(Georgia (country))	DF	8 February 1993 (aged 26)	Chornomorets Odesa	2017		55	3
15	Valeriy Bondarenko	(Ukraine)	DF	3 February 1994 (aged 25)	Oleksandriya	2019		1	0
18	Ivan Ordets	(Ukraine)	DF	8 July 1992 (aged 26)	Academy	2009		101	4
22	Mykola Matviyenko	(Ukraine)	DF	28 February 2000 (aged 19)	Academy	2015		40	3
31	Ismaily	(Brazil)	DF	11 January 1990 (aged 29)	Braga	2013	2023	171	12
77	Valeriy Bondar	(Ukraine)	DF	27 February 1999 (aged 20)	Academy	2018		1	0
Midfielders
6	Taras Stepanenko	(Ukraine)	MF	8 August 1989 (aged 29)	Metalurh Zaporizhzhia	2010	2022	272	19
7	Taison	(Brazil)	MF	17 January 1988 (aged 31)	Metalist Kharkiv	2013	2021	232	42
11	Marlos	(Ukraine)	MF	7 June 1988 (aged 30)	Metalist Kharkiv	2014	2021	194	57
14	Tetê	(Brazil)	MF	15 February 2000 (aged 19)	Grêmio	2019		10	4
17	Maksym Malyshev	(Ukraine)	MF	24 December 1992 (aged 26)	Academy	2009		77	7
19	Manor Solomon	(Israel)	MF	24 July 1999 (aged 19)	Maccabi Petah Tikva	2019		16	1
21	Alan Patrick	(Brazil)	MF	13 May 1991 (aged 28)	Santos	2011	2016	86	8
23	Wellington Nem	(Brazil)	MF	6 February 1992 (aged 27)	Fluminense	2013	2018	77	12
27	Maycon	(Brazil)	MF	15 July 1997 (aged 21)	Corinthians	2018		30	5
28	Marquinhos Cipriano	(Brazil)	MF	9 February 1999 (aged 20)	São Paulo	2018		5	0
29	Andriy Totovytskyi	(Ukraine)	MF	20 January 1993 (aged 26)	Academy	2010		9	1
50	Serhiy Bolbat	(Ukraine)	MF	13 June 1993 (aged 25)	Academy	2011		32	3
74	Viktor Kovalenko	(Ukraine)	MF	14 February 1996 (aged 23)	Academy	2008		162	26
88	Marcos Antônio	(Brazil)	MF	13 June 2000 (aged 18)	Estoril	2019		10	1
99	Fernando	(Brazil)	MF	1 March 1999 (aged 20)	Palmeiras	2019		22	2
Forwards
8	Olarenwaju Kayode	(Nigeria)	FW	8 May 1993 (aged 26)	Manchester City	2018	2018	24	4
9	Dentinho	(Brazil)	FW	19 January 1989 (aged 30)	Corinthians	2011		154	20
10	Júnior Moraes	(Ukraine)	FW	4 April 1987 (aged 32)	Dynamo Kyiv	2018		39	26
Also under contract
	Ruslan Yefanov	(Ukraine)	GK	5 May 1996 (aged 23)	Academy	2012			
	Andriy Zaporoshchenko	(Ukraine)	DF	23 July 1998 (aged 20)	Academy	2018			
	Volodymyr Hrachov	(Ukraine)	DF	24 December 1997 (aged 21)	Academy	2014			
	Oleksandr Masalov	(Ukraine)	DF	22 January 1997 (aged 22)	Academy	2018			
Away on loan
91	Mykhailo Mudryk	(Ukraine)	MF	5 January 2001 (aged 18)	Academy	2018		1	0
	Gustavo Blanco Leschuk	(Argentina)	FW	5 November 1991 (aged 27)	Karpaty Lviv	2017	2020	31	8
Players who left during the season
44	Yaroslav Rakitskyi	(Ukraine)	DF	3 August 1989 (aged 29)	Academy	2009	2022	325	14
94	Oleh Danchenko	(Ukraine)	DF	1 August 1994 (aged 24)	Chornomorets Odesa	2016		12	1

=== U21 team squad ===
Note: Flags indicate national team as defined under FIFA eligibility rules; some limited exceptions apply. Players may hold more than one non-FIFA nationality.

No.	Pos.	Nation	Player
56	MF	UKR	Andriy Kulakov
57	FW	UKR	Oleksiy Kashchuk
58	DF	UKR	Yevhen Chahovets
59	MF	UKR	Mykyta Adamenko
61	MF	UKR	Dmytro Topalov
62	MF	UKR	Volodymyr Yakimets
63	FW	UKR	Oleksandr Hlahola
64	FW	UKR	Roman Yalovenko
65	DF	UKR	Yukhym Konoplya
68	GK	UKR	Anatoliy Trubin
71	MF	UKR	Maksym Chekh
72	FW	UKR	Vladyslav Kuzmenko

No.	Pos.	Nation	Player
75	MF	UKR	Viktor Korniyenko
77	DF	UKR	Valeriy Bondar
78	DF	UKR	Yuriy Mate
79	GK	UKR	Vladyslav Vertyey
82	GK	UKR	Yevhen Kucherenko
83	MF	UKR	Dmytro Kryskiv
84	FW	UKR	Artem Kholod
85	MF	UKR	Kyrylo Melichenko
86	DF	UKR	Dmytro Pavlish
87	DF	UKR	Nazariy Muravskyi
89	FW	BLR	Ilya Vasilevich
92	MF	UKR	Maksym Andrushchenko

== Transfers ==
=== Transfer in ===
Date	Position	No.	Player	From club	Fee	Ref.
8 June 2018	FW	8	(Nigeria) Olarenwaju Kayode	(England) Manchester City	€3,000,000	
16 June 2018	MF	99	(Brazil) Fernando	(Brazil) Palmeiras	€5,500,000	
17 June 2018	GK	1	(Ukraine) Oleksiy Shevchenko	(Ukraine) Karpaty Lviv	Undisclosed	
17 June 2018	MF	27	(Brazil) Maycon	(Brazil) Corinthians	€6,600,000	
18 June 2018	FW	10	(Ukraine) Júnior Moraes	(Ukraine) Dynamo Kyiv	Free	
10 July 2018	MF	28	(Brazil) Marquinhos Cipriano	(Brazil) São Paulo	€1,000,000	
11 January 2019	MF	19	(Israel) Manor Solomon	(Israel) Maccabi Petah Tikva	€6,000,000	
21 January 2019	FW	14	(Ukraine) Danylo Sikan	(Ukraine) Karpaty Lviv	€150,000	
23 January 2019	DF	15	(Ukraine) Valeriy Bondarenko	(Ukraine) Oleksandriya	€600,000	
19 February 2019	MF	88	(Brazil) Marcos Antônio	(Portugal) Estoril	€3,500,000	
28 February 2019	MF	14	(Brazil) Tetê	(Brazil) Grêmio	€15,000,000	
Total					€41,350,000	

=== Transfer out ===
Date	Position	No.	Player	To club	Fee	Ref.
5 June 2018	MF	8	(Brazil) Fred	(England) Manchester United	€59,000,000	
6 June 2018	FW	19	(Argentina) Facundo Ferreyra	(Portugal) Benfica	Free	
22 June 2018	DF	33	(Croatia) Darijo Srna	(Italy) Cagliari	Free	
27 June 2018	FW		(Ukraine) Vladyslav Buhay	(Ukraine) Mariupol	Free	
1 July 2018	MF	60	(Ukraine) Oleksiy Zinkevych	(Ukraine) Volyn Lutsk	Free	
3 July 2018	FW	41	(Georgia (country)) Giorgi Arabidze	(Portugal) Nacional	Undisclosed	
4 July 2018	FW		(Ukraine) Artur Zahorulko	(Ukraine) Olimpik Donetsk	Free	
8 July 2018	FW	86	(Ukraine) Ruslan Fomin	(Ukraine) Mariupol	Free	
24 July 2018	DF	66	(Brazil) Márcio Azevedo	(Brazil) Atlético Paranaense	Free	
9 August 2018	MF	10	(Brazil) Bernard	(England) Everton	Free	
25 September 2018	MF	24	(Ukraine) Dmytro Hrechyshkin	(Ukraine) Oleksandriya	Free	
17 December 2018	DF		(Ukraine) Ihor Duts	(Ukraine) Rukh	Free	
14 January 2019	MF	60	(Ukraine) Illya Putrya	(Ukraine) Mariupol	Free	
15 January 2019	MF	24	(Ukraine) Serhiy Hryn	(Denmark) Vejle Boldklub	Free	
18 January 2019	FW	50	(Ukraine) Pylyp Budkivskyi	(Ukraine) Zorya Luhansk	Free	
28 January 2019	DF	44	(Ukraine) Yaroslav Rakitskiy	(Russia) Zenit Saint Petersburg	€10,000,000	
12 February 2019	GK	26	(Ukraine) Mykyta Shevchenko	(Ukraine) Zorya Luhansk	Free	
Total					€69,000,000	

=== Loan in ===
Date	Position	No.	Player	From club	Fee	Ref.
Total					€0	

=== Loan out ===
Date	Position	No.	Player	To club	Fee	Ref.
2 February 2018	DF		(Ukraine) Taras Kacharaba	(Czech Republic) Slovan	Free	
13 June 2018	DF	76	(Azerbaijan) Murad Khachayev	(Azerbaijan) Sumgayit	Free	
13 June 2018	MF	72	(Ukraine) Vyacheslav Churko	(Ukraine) Mariupol	Free	
15 June 2018	DF	69	(Ukraine) Danylo Sahutkin	(Ukraine) Arsenal Kyiv	Free	
20 June 2018	FW	41	(Ukraine) Andriy Boryachuk	(Ukraine) Mariupol	Free	
28 June 2018	GK	54	(Ukraine) Yevhen Hrytsenko	(Ukraine) Mariupol	Free	
28 June 2018	DF	16	(Ukraine) Serhiy Chobotenko	(Ukraine) Mariupol	Free	
29 June 2018	MF	97	(Ukraine) Danylo Ihnatenko	(Ukraine) Mariupol	Free	
29 June 2018	DF	52	(Ukraine) Ihor Kyryukhantsev	(Ukraine) Mariupol	Free	
5 July 2018	FW		(Ukraine) Denys Bezborodko	(Ukraine) Desna	Free	
8 July 2018	MF	34	(Ukraine) Ivan Petryak	(Hungary) Ferencvárosi	Free	
11 July 2018	DF		(Ukraine) Yuriy Senytskyi	(Ukraine) Avanhard	Free	
21 July 2018	MF	67	(Ukraine) Oleksandr Pikhalyonok	(Ukraine) Mariupol	Free	
22 July 2018	MF	58	(Ukraine) Andriy Korobenko	(Ukraine) Mariupol	Free	
29 July 2018	DF	98	(Brazil) Dodô	(Portugal) Vitória	Free	
8 August 2018	FW	99	(Argentina) Gustavo Blanco Leschuk	(Spain) Malaga	Free	
31 August 2018	MF	59	(Ukraine) Oleksandr Zubkov	(Ukraine) Mariupol	Free	
3 September 2018	DF	95	(Ukraine) Eduard Sobol	(Czech Republic) Jablonec	Free	
12 September 2018	FW		(Ukraine) Denys Arendaruk	(Ukraine) Rukh	Free	
1 February 2019	DF	94	(Ukraine) Oleh Danchenko	(Russia) Yenisey	Free	
12 February 2019	FW		(Ukraine) Vladyslav Kulach	(Ukraine) Oleksandriya	Free	
13 February 2019	FW	14	(Ukraine) Danylo Sikan	(Ukraine) Mariupol	Free	
22 February 2019	DF		(Ukraine) Serhiy Vakulenko	(Ukraine) Arsenal Kyiv	Free	
22 February 2019	MF	20	(Ukraine) Vyacheslav Tankovskyi	(Ukraine) Arsenal Kyiv	Free	
1 March 2019	MF	91	(Ukraine) Mykhailo Mudryk	(Ukraine) Arsenal Kyiv	Free	
3 March 2019	FW	90	(Ukraine) Artem Dudik	(Belarus) Slutsk	Free	
Total					€0	

=== Loan return ===
Date	Position	No.	Player	From club	Fee	Ref.
20 December 2018	DF		(Ukraine) Dmytro Shevchenko	(Ukraine) Rukh	Free	
Total					€0	

== 2018–19 selection by nationality ==
Nationality	(Ukraine)	(Brazil)	(Argentina)	(Georgia (country))	(Azerbaijan)	(Nigeria)	(Belarus)	(Israel)	Total players
Current squad selection	15	10	-	1	-	1	-	1	28
Youth/reserves squad selection	23	-	-	-	-	-	1	-	24
Players out on loan	23	1	1	-	1	-	-	-	26

== Friendlies ==
26 June 2018	Brøndby (Denmark)	2 – 3	(Ukraine) Shakhtar Donetsk	Kufstein, Austria
18:00EEST (UTC+3)	Fisker 52'; Frendrup 66'	Summary	Fernando 57', 60'; Totovytskyi 64'	Stadium: Grenzlandstadion

30 June 2018	CSKA Sofia (Bulgaria)	0 – 0	(Ukraine) Shakhtar Donetsk	Kufstein, Austria
15:00EEST (UTC+3)		Summary		Stadium: Grenzlandstadion

5 July 2018	Austria Wien	0 – 3	(Ukraine) Shakhtar Donetsk	Villach, Austria
19:00EEST (UTC+3)		Summary	Moraes 16' (pen.); Ismaily 44'; Fernando 54'	Stadium: Stadion Villach-Lind

9 July 2018	Vitesse (Netherlands)	1 – 4	(Ukraine) Shakhtar Donetsk	Sankt Veit an der Glan, Austria
19:00EEST (UTC+3)	Foor (yellow card) 41'; Beerens 89'	Summary	Stepanenko 31'; Dentinho (yellow card) 45+1'; Butko 57'; Kovalenko 76'; Moraes 81'	Stadium: Jacques Lemans Arena

12 July 2018	Beşiktaş (Turkey)	0 – 0	(Ukraine) Shakhtar Donetsk	Wolfsberg, Austria
18:00EEST (UTC+3)		Summary		Stadium: Lavanttal-Arena; Referee: Sebastian Gishamer (Austria)

11 October 2018	Arsenal Kyiv (Ukraine)	0 – 3	(Ukraine) Shakhtar Donetsk	Kyiv, Ukraine
11:00EEST (UTC+3)		Summary	Fernando 10'; Moraes 14' (pen.); Maycon 45'	Stadium: Svyatoshyn Olympic Base

22 January 2019	Hajduk Split (Croatia)	4 – 1	(Ukraine) Shakhtar Donetsk	Belek, Turkey
16:00 EEST (UTC+3)	Caktaš 21' (pen.); Delić 23'; Jairo 40'; Teklić 60'	Summary	Dentinho 30'	Stadium: Regnum Sports Centre; Attendance: 100

26 January 2019	Qarabağ (Azerbaijan)	1 – 3	(Ukraine) Shakhtar Donetsk	Belek, Turkey
10:00 EEST (UTC+3)	Zoubir 64'	Summary	Moraes 26'; Marlos 27'; Mudryk 77'	Stadium: Regnum Sports Centre

31 January 2019	Hobro (Denmark)	1 – 2	(Ukraine) Shakhtar Donetsk	Belek, Turkey
10:00 EEST (UTC+3)	Babayan (yellow card) 61'; Pedersen 67'	Summary	Nem (yellow card) 24'; Kovalenko 78'; Moraes 90+1'	Stadium: Regnum Sports Centre; Attendance: 100

31 January 2019	Lech Poznań (Poland)	0 – 3	(Ukraine) Shakhtar Donetsk	Belek, Turkey
16:00 EEST (UTC+3)		Summary	Moraes 31'; Solomon 84'; Kayode 90'	Stadium: Regnum Sports Centre; Attendance: 50

3 February 2019	Partizan (Serbia)	2 – 0	(Ukraine) Shakhtar Donetsk	Belek, Turkey
16:00 EEST (UTC+3)	Nikolić 8'; Šćekić 39'	Summary		Stadium: Cornelia Diamond; Attendance: 100

4 February 2019	Botev Plovdiv (Bulgaria)	1 – 6	(Ukraine) Shakhtar Donetsk	Belek, Turkey
10:00 EEST (UTC+3)	Marin 47'	Summary	Totovytskyi 33', 37'; Butko 51'; Kayode 54', 87'; Malyshev (yellow card) 68'; Maycon 71'	Stadium: Regnum Sports Centre; Attendance: 50

7 February 2019	Wacker Innsbruck (Austria)	0 – 0	(Ukraine) Shakhtar Donetsk	Belek, Turkey
10:00 EEST (UTC+3)	Maranda (yellow card) 52'	Summary		Stadium: Regnum Sports Centre; Attendance: 50

12 March 2019	Shakhtar Donetsk U21 (Ukraine)	1 – 2	(Ukraine) Shakhtar Donetsk	Kyiv, Ukraine
EEST (UTC+3)	Topalov	Summary	Fernando; Tetê	Stadium: Svyatoshyn Olympic Base

27 March 2019	Olimpik Donetsk (Ukraine)	0 – 4	(Ukraine) Shakhtar Donetsk	Kyiv, Ukraine
11:00 EEST (UTC+3)		Summary	Fernando 44'; Nem 55'; Tetê 68'; Marcos Antônio 89'	Stadium: Svyatoshyn Olympic Base

== Competitions ==
=== Overall ===
Competition	First match	Last match	Starting round	Final position	Record							
Competition	First match	Last match	Starting round	Final position	Pld	W	D	L	GF	GA	GD	Win %
Premier League	25 July 2018	30 May 2019	Matchday 1	Winners	32	26	5	1	73	11	+62	81.25
Ukrainian Cup	31 October 2018	15 May 2019	Round of 16	Winners	4	4	0	0	10	3	+7	100.00
Super Cup	21 July 2018		Final	Runnersup	1	0	0	1	0	1	−1	0.00
UEFA Champions League	19 September 2018	12 December 2018	Group Stage	Group Stage	6	1	3	2	8	16	−8	16.67
UEFA Europa League	14 February 2019	21 February 2019	Round of 32	Round of 32	2	0	1	1	3	6	−3	0.00
Total					45	31	9	5	94	37	+57	68.89

Last updated: 21 May 2016
Source: Results

=== Super Cup ===
21 July 2018 Final	Shakhtar Donetsk	0 – 1	Dynamo Kyiv	Odesa
21:00EEST (UTC+3)	Danchenko (yellow card) 53'; Fernando (yellow card) 60'; Moraes (yellow card) 90+3'; Totovytskyi (yellow card) 90+5'; Ismaily (red card) 90+5'	Summary	Burda (yellow card) 13' (yellow-red card) 90+5'; Buyalskyi 18'; Shepelyev (yellow card) 71'; Kádár (yellow card) 81'; Kędziora (yellow card) 90+5'; Boyko (yellow card) 90+7'	Stadium: Chornomorets Stadium; Attendance: 27,400; Referee: Kostyantin Trukhanov

=== Premier League ===
==== League table ====
Pos	Team	Pld	W	D	L	GF	GA	GD	Pts	Qualification or relegation (Note: Teams play each other twice (22 matches), before the league split into two groups (the top six and the bottom six) for the last 10 matches.)
1	Shakhtar Donetsk	22	18	3	1	52	9	+43	57	Qualification for the Championship round
2	Dynamo Kyiv	22	16	2	4	40	11	+29	50	Qualification for the Championship round
3	FC Oleksandriya	22	12	5	5	31	19	+12	41	Qualification for the Championship round
4	Zorya Luhansk	22	8	8	6	28	20	+8	32	Qualification for the Championship round
5	FC Lviv	22	7	9	6	19	20	−1	30	Qualification for the Championship round

Source: Ukrainian Premier League Soccerway
Rules for classification: 1) Points; 2) Head-to-head points; 3) Head-to-head goal difference; 4) Head-to-head higher number of goals scored; 5) Goal difference; 6) Higher number of goals scored; 7) Draw or "golden match" if tied for title (Article 22, paragraph 3).
Notes:

Teams that placed 10th and 11th in the 2018–19 Ukrainian Premier League play two-leg play-off with the second and third teams of the 2018–19 Ukrainian First League. The draw for play-offs took place on 24 May 2019 and the games will be played on 4 and 8 June 2019.

Team 1	Agg.	Team 2	1st leg	2nd leg
Chornomorets Odesa	0 – 2	Kolos Kovalivka	0 – 0	0 – 2
Karpaty Lviv	3 – 1	Volyn Lutsk	0 – 0	3 – 1

=== First leg ===
4 June 2019
19:00 UTC+3

Chornomorets Odesa	0 – 0	Kolos Kovalivka
	Report

Chornomorets Stadium, Odesa
Attendance: 5,435
Referee: Anatoliy Abdula (Kharkiv)

4 June 2019
19:00 UTC+3

Karpaty Lviv	0 – 0	Volyn Lutsk
	Report

Ukraina Stadium, Lviv
Attendance: 10,104
Referee: Denys Shurman (Vyshneve)

=== Second leg ===
8 June 2019
17:00 UTC+3

Kolos Kovalivka	2 – 0	Chornomorets Odesa
Havrysh 57', 63' (pen.)	Report

Kolos Stadium, Kovalivka
Attendance: 2,500
Referee: Vitaliy Romanov

Kolos Kovalivka won 2–0 on aggregate and were promoted to the 2019–20 Ukrainian Premier League. Chornomorets Odesa were relegated to the 2019–20 Ukrainian First League

8 June 2019
19:00 UTC+3

Volyn Lutsk	0 – 3 ~~1 – 3~~	Karpaty Lviv
Kozhanov 42'	Report	Klyots 37'; Ponde 82' (pen.); Miroshnichenko 90+5'

Avanhard Stadium, Lutsk
Attendance: 5,200
Referee: Maksym Kozyryatskyi

Karpaty Lviv won 3–0 on aggregate and retained their spot in the 2019–20 Ukrainian Premier League. Volyn Lutsk remained in the 2019–20 Ukrainian First League

Due to fan violence at the game and attack on referee, the original score 1–3 was scratched and replaced with technical score 0–3 loss to Volyn and win for Karpaty. Additionally, the Lutsk department of police started criminal proceedings on the fact of intentional damage to property during the game by the Karpaty fans.

=== Championship round table ===
Pos	Team	Pld	W	D	L	GF	GA	GD	Pts	Qualification or relegation
1	Shakhtar Donetsk (C)	32	26	5	1	73	11	+62	83	Qualification for the Champions League group stage
2	Dynamo Kyiv	32	22	6	4	54	18	+36	72	Qualification for the Champions League third qualifying round
3	FC Oleksandriya	32	14	7	11	39	34	+5	49	Qualification for the Europa League group stage (Note: Since the winners of the 2018–19 Ukrainian Cup, Shakhtar Donetsk, qualified for European competition based on league position, the spot awarded to the cup winners (Europa League group stage) was passed to the third-placed team, the spot awarded to the third-placed team (Europa League third qualifying round) was passed to the fourth-placed team, and the spot awarded to the fourth-placed team (Europa League second qualifying round) was passed to the fifth-placed team.)
4	FC Mariupol	32	12	7	13	36	47	−11	43 (Note: Head to Head: Mariupol – Zorya +3=0-1, advantage Mariupol.)	Qualification for the Europa League third qualifying round
5	Zorya Luhansk	32	11	10	11	39	34	+5	43	Qualification for the Europa League second qualifying round

Source: Ukrainian Premier League (in Ukrainian), UEFA, Soccerway
Rules for classification: 1) Points; 2) Head-to-head points; 3) Head-to-head goal difference; 4) Head-to-head higher number of goals scored; 5) Goal difference; 6) Higher number of goals scored; 7) Draw or "golden match" if tied for title (Article 22, paragraph 3).
(C) Champions
Notes:

Teams that placed 10th and 11th in the 2018–19 Ukrainian Premier League play two-leg play-off with the second and third teams of the 2018–19 Ukrainian First League. The draw for play-offs took place on 24 May 2019 and the games will be played on 4 and 8 June 2019.

Team 1	Agg.	Team 2	1st leg	2nd leg
Chornomorets Odesa	0 – 2	Kolos Kovalivka	0 – 0	0 – 2
Karpaty Lviv	3 – 1	Volyn Lutsk	0 – 0	3 – 1

=== First leg ===
4 June 2019
19:00 UTC+3

Chornomorets Odesa	0 – 0	Kolos Kovalivka
	Report

Chornomorets Stadium, Odesa
Attendance: 5,435
Referee: Anatoliy Abdula (Kharkiv)

4 June 2019
19:00 UTC+3

Karpaty Lviv	0 – 0	Volyn Lutsk
	Report

Ukraina Stadium, Lviv
Attendance: 10,104
Referee: Denys Shurman (Vyshneve)

=== Second leg ===
8 June 2019
17:00 UTC+3

Kolos Kovalivka	2 – 0	Chornomorets Odesa
Havrysh 57', 63' (pen.)	Report

Kolos Stadium, Kovalivka
Attendance: 2,500
Referee: Vitaliy Romanov

Kolos Kovalivka won 2–0 on aggregate and were promoted to the 2019–20 Ukrainian Premier League. Chornomorets Odesa were relegated to the 2019–20 Ukrainian First League

8 June 2019
19:00 UTC+3

Volyn Lutsk	0 – 3 ~~1 – 3~~	Karpaty Lviv
Kozhanov 42'	Report	Klyots 37'; Ponde 82' (pen.); Miroshnichenko 90+5'

Avanhard Stadium, Lutsk
Attendance: 5,200
Referee: Maksym Kozyryatskyi

Karpaty Lviv won 3–0 on aggregate and retained their spot in the 2019–20 Ukrainian Premier League. Volyn Lutsk remained in the 2019–20 Ukrainian First League

Due to fan violence at the game and attack on referee, the original score 1–3 was scratched and replaced with technical score 0–3 loss to Volyn and win for Karpaty. Additionally, the Lutsk department of police started criminal proceedings on the fact of intentional damage to property during the game by the Karpaty fans.

==== Results summary ====
Overall								Home						Away					
Pld	W	D	L	GF	GA	GD	Pts	W	D	L	GF	GA	GD	W	D	L	GF	GA	GD
32	26	5	1	73	11	+62	83	12	4	0	40	7	+33	14	1	1	33	4	+29

==== Results by round ====
Round	1	2	3	4	5	6	7	8	9	10	11	12	13	14	15	16	17	18	19	20	21	22	23	24	25	26	27	28	29	30	31	32
Ground	A	H	A	H	A	A	H	A	H	A	H	H	A	H	A	H	H	A	H	A	H	A	A	H	A	A	H	H	A	H	H	A
Result	W	W	L	W	W	W	W	W	W	W	D	W	W	W	W	D	D	W	W	W	W	W	W	W	D	W	W	W	W	D	W	W
Position	3	1	3	3	2	1	1	1	1	1	1	1	1	1	1	1	1	1	1	1	1	1	1	1	1	1	1	1	1	1	1	1

Updated to match(es) played on 31 May 2019. Source: Socceraway
A = Away; H = Home; W = Win; D = Draw; L = Loss

==== Results ====
25 July 2018 1	Desna Chernihiv	0 – 2	Shakhtar Donetsk	Chernihiv
19:00 EEST (UTC+3)	Koberidze (yellow card) 45+1'	Summary	Patrick (yellow card) 25'; Moraes 31'; Marlos 55'; Rakitskiy (yellow card) 90+1'	Stadium: Stadion Yuri Gagarin; Attendance: 5,500; Referee: Anatoliy Abdula

29 July 2018 2	Shakhtar Donetsk	3 – 0	Arsenal-CSKA Kyiv	Kharkiv
19:30 EEST (UTC+3)	Moraes 10'; Fernando 32'; Taison 37'	Summary	Balta (yellow card) 17'; Jevtoski (yellow card) 49'; Nikolić (yellow card) 78'	Stadium: OSC Metalist; Attendance: 6,541; Referee: Vitaliy Romanov

3 August 2018 3	Dynamo Kyiv	1 – 0	Shakhtar Donetsk	Kyiv
19:00 EEST (UTC+3)	Buyalskyi (yellow card) 57'; Verbič 65'	Summary	Khocholava (yellow card) 30'; Ismaily (yellow card) 51'; Stepanenko (yellow card) 55'	Stadium: NSC Olimpiyskiy; Attendance: 46,475; Referee: Yuriy Mozharovskyi

11 August 2018 4	Shakhtar Donetsk	4 – 1	Vorskla Poltava	Kharkiv
19:30 EEST (UTC+3)	Stepanenko (yellow card) 10' (goal) 59'; Marlos 50'; Khocholava 62'; Moraes 74'	Summary	Sharpar 25'; Careca (yellow card) 30'; Habelok (yellow card) 53'	Stadium: OSC Metalist; Attendance: 6,438; Referee: Mykola Balakin

18 August 2018 5	Lviv	0 – 2	Shakhtar Donetsk	Lviv
17:00 EEST (UTC+3)	Kalenchuk (yellow card) 24'	Summary	Marlos 21'; Patrick (yellow card) 47'; Bolbat 90'	Stadium: Ukraina Stadium; Attendance: 6,333; Referee: Serhiy Boyko

24 August 2018 6	Olimpik Donetsk	2 – 5	Shakhtar Donetsk	Kyiv
19:00 EEST (UTC+3)	Pasich 19' (yellow card) 70'; Morozenko (yellow card) 57'; Danchenko 76' (o.g.)	Summary	Marlos 11'; Moraes 17', 32', 75'; Nem (yellow card) 25'; Stepanenko 42'; Danchenko (yellow card) 80'; Fernando (yellow card) 84'	Stadium: Lobanovsky Dynamo Stadium; Attendance: 4,230; Referee: Dmytro Kutakov

1 September 2018 7	Shakhtar Donetsk	2 – 0	Mariupol	Kharkiv
19:30 EEST (UTC+3)	Rakitskiy (yellow card) 34'; Moraes 43'; Dawa 56' (o.g.)	Summary	Tyschenko (yellow card) 40'	Stadium: OSC Metalist; Attendance: 8,014; Referee: Kateryna Monzul

15 September 2018 8	Oleksandriya	0 – 2	Shakhtar Donetsk	Oleksandriya
14:00 EEST (UTC+3)	Tsurikov (yellow card) 16'	Summary	Marlos 26'; Stepanenko (yellow card) 37'; Rakitskiy (yellow card) 67'; Kovalenko 88'	Stadium: CSC Nika Stadium; Attendance: 5,800; Referee: Yaroslav Kozyk

23 September 2018 9	Shakhtar Donetsk	3 – 0	Chornomorets Odesa	Kharkiv
17:00 EEST (UTC+3)	Moraes (yellow card) 9' (goal) 57'; Maycon (yellow card) 16'; Trubochkin 59' (o.g.); Taison 82'	Summary	Ryzhuk (yellow card) 6'; Babenko (yellow card) 72'	Stadium: OSC Metalist; Attendance: 6,081; Referee: Yevhen Aranovsky

28 September 2018 10	Karpaty Lviv	1 – 6	Shakhtar Donetsk	Lviv
19:00 EEST (UTC+3)	Kovtun (yellow card) 32'; Mehremić (yellow card) 60'; Boroday (yellow card) 63'; Erbes (yellow card) 67'; Shved 90+2'	Summary	Rakitskiy 13' (yellow card) 65'; Fernando 26'; Moraes 29'; Maycon (yellow card) 31'; Marlos 35'; Boroday 45+1' (o.g.); Matviyenko 80'	Stadium: Ukraina Stadium; Attendance: 9,127; Referee: Viktor Kopiyevskyi

7 October 2018 11	Shakhtar Donetsk	1 – 1	Zorya Luhansk	Kharkiv
17:00 EEST (UTC+3)	Moraes 38' (yellow card) 44'; Matviyenko (yellow card) 48'	Summary	Leonardo (yellow card) 14'; Kharatin 49' (yellow card) 74'; Luiz Felipe (yellow card) 90+1'	Stadium: OSC Metalist; Attendance: 6,015; Referee: Mykola Kryvonosov

19 October 2018 12	Shakhtar Donetsk	1 – 0	Desna Chernihiv	Kharkiv
19:00 EEST (UTC+3)	Kayode (red card) 65'; Moraes (yellow card) 78'; Maycon 88'; Marlos (yellow card) 90'	Summary	Koberidze (yellow card) 34'; Bratkov (yellow card) 63'; Mostovyi (yellow card) 69'; Past (yellow card) 81'; Imerekov (yellow card) 87'	Stadium: OSC Metalist; Attendance: 4,119; Referee: Serhiy Boyko

27 October 2018 13	Arsenal-CSKA Kyiv	0 – 3	Shakhtar Donetsk	Kyiv
17:00 EEST (UTC+3)	Jevtoski (yellow card) 40'; Osman (yellow card) 45+1'; Zozulya (yellow card) 62'; Maydanevych (yellow card) 66'	Summary	Patrick 45'; Bolbat 55'; Khocholava (yellow card) 59'; Kovalenko 63' (pen.)	Stadium: Lobanovsky Dynamo Stadium; Attendance: 2,317; Referee: Ihor Paskhal

3 November 2018 14	Shakhtar Donetsk	2 – 1	Dynamo Kyiv	Kharkiv
17:00 EEST (UTC+3)	Stepanenko (yellow card) 26'; Rakitskiy (yellow card) 45+1'; Moraes 54' (yellow card) 60'; Kryvtsov (yellow card) 90+2'; Kovalenko 90+5' (yellow card) 90+5'	Summary	Shaparenko 44'; Mykolenko (yellow card) 64'; Kędziora (yellow card) 78' (yellow-red card) 90+2'; Verbič (yellow card) 90+2'	Stadium: OSC Metalist; Attendance: 17,125; Referee: Vitaliy Romanov

11 November 2018 15	Vorskla Poltava	0 – 2	Shakhtar Donetsk	Poltava
19:30 EEST (UTC+3)	Sklyar (yellow card) 66'	Summary	Nem 19'; Maycon 41' (yellow card) 68'	Stadium: Vorskla Stadium; Attendance: 2,783; Referee: Maksym Kozyryanskyi

23 November 2018 16	Shakhtar Donetsk	0 – 0	Lviv	Kharkiv
19:00 EEST (UTC+3)	Rakitskiy (yellow card) 44'	Summary	Paramonov (yellow card) 8'; Jonatan (yellow card) 16'; Pryimak (yellow card) 46'; Sabino (yellow card) 69'; Bandura (yellow card) 73'	Stadium: OSC Metalist; Attendance: 3,753; Referee: Mykola Balakin

2 December 2018 17	Shakhtar Donetsk	2 – 2	Olimpik Donetsk	Kharkiv
17:00 EEST (UTC+3)	Moraes 7', 90+3' (yellow card) 69'; Stepanenko (yellow card) 44'; Maycon (yellow card) 51'; Danchenko (yellow card) 65'; Taison (yellow card) 90+5'; Alan Patrick (yellow card) 90+5'	Summary	Yevhen Pasich 52'; Koltsov (yellow card) 60'; Balashov 66'; Makhnovskyi (yellow card) 85'; Politylo (yellow card) 90+5'	Stadium: OSC Metalist; Attendance: 2,137; Referee: Viktor Kopiyevskyi

7 December 2018 18	Mariupol	0 – 3	Shakhtar Donetsk	Mariupol
17:00 EEST (UTC+3)	Yavorskyi (yellow card) 20'; Khudzhamov (yellow card) 62'; Dawa (yellow card) 64'; Bilyi (yellow card) 67'	Summary	Kryvtsov (yellow card) 50'; Stepanenko 62'; Moraes 64'; Marlos 70'	Stadium: Volodymyr Boiko Stadium; Attendance: 5,983; Referee: Anatoliy Abdula

25 February 2019 19	Shakhtar Donetsk	2 – 0	Oleksandriya	Kharkiv
19:00 EEST (UTC+3)	Kryvtsov (yellow card) 11'; Marlos 14'; Moraes 35'	Summary	Stetskov (yellow card) 25'; Dedechko (yellow card) 55'; Sitalo (yellow card) 88'	Stadium: OSC Metalist; Attendance: 2,899; Referee: Yaroslav Kozyk

2 March 2019 20	Chornomorets Odesa	0 – 1	Shakhtar Donetsk	Odesa
17:00 EEST (UTC+3)	Ryzhuk (yellow card) 42'; Litovchenko (yellow card) 53'; Arzhanov (yellow card) 59'	Summary	Kryvtsov (yellow card) 65'; Marlos 76' (pen.) (yellow card) 90+2'	Stadium: Chornomorets Stadium; Attendance: 10,145; Referee: Ihor Paskhal

10 March 2019 21	Shakhtar Donetsk	5 – 0	Karpaty Lviv	Kharkiv
17:00 EEST (UTC+3)	Kovalenko 6', 64'; Matviyenko 35'; Maycon 44'; Khocholava (yellow card) 63'; Ismaily (yellow card) 71'; Taison 79'	Summary	Hongla (yellow card) 52' (yellow-red card) 78'; Myakushko (yellow card) 54'; Mehremić (yellow card) 60'	Stadium: OSC Metalist; Attendance: 4,746; Referee: Denys Shurman

16 March 2019 22	Zorya Luhansk	0 – 1	Shakhtar Donetsk	Zaporizhia
17:00 EEST (UTC+3)	Cheberko (yellow card) 10'; Lytvyn (yellow card) 60'; Lunyov (yellow card) 77'; Vernydub (yellow card) 86'	Summary	Moraes (yellow card) 19' (goal) 25'; Marlos (yellow card) 35'; Taison (yellow card) 70'; Kryvtsov (yellow card) 81'	Stadium: Slavutych-Arena; Attendance: 9,227; Referee: Vitaliy Romanov

3 April 2019 23	Oleksandriya	0 – 1	Shakhtar Donetsk	Oleksandriya
17:00 EEST (UTC+3)	Tsurikov (yellow card) 11'; Hrechyshkin (yellow card) 37'; Shendrik (yellow card) 81'; Sitalo (yellow card) 90+4'	Summary	Moraes 12' (pen.) (yellow card) 37'; Patrick (yellow card) 30'; Kovalenko (yellow card) 35'; Stepanenko (yellow card) 60'; Taison (yellow card) 90+4'	Stadium: CSC Nika Stadium; Attendance: 3,574; Referee: Denys Shurman

13 April 2019 24	Shakhtar Donetsk	3 – 0	Zorya Luhansk	Kharkiv
17:00 EEST (UTC+3)	Kovalenko 15' (pen.); Kryvtsov (yellow card) 23'; Kayode 50'; Maycon 90+1'	Summary	Vernydub (yellow card) 22'; Kazakov (yellow card) 80'; Mykhaylychenko (yellow card) 90'	Stadium: OSC Metalist; Attendance: 6,154; Referee: Anatoliy Abdula

24 April 2019 25	Dynamo Kyiv	0 – 0	Shakhtar Donetsk	Kyiv
18:30 EEST (UTC+3)	Buyalskyi (yellow card) 31'; Burda (yellow card) 57'; Mykolenko (yellow card) 59' de Pena (yellow card) 62'; Tsitaishvili (yellow card) 79'	Summary	Moraes (yellow card) 57'; Bolbat (yellow card) 63'; Taison (yellow card) 78'; Dentinho (yellow card) 87'	Stadium: NSC Olimpiyskiy; Attendance: 41,383; Referee: Vitaliy Romanov

28 April 2019 26	Mariupol	0 – 1	Shakhtar Donetsk	Mariupol
14:00 EEST (UTC+3)	Tyschenko (yellow card) 32'; Demiri (yellow card) 40'; Polehenko (red card) 49'; Yavorskyi (yellow card) 55'; Myshnyov (yellow card) 66'; Vakula (yellow card) 80'	Summary	Nem 12'; Khocholava (yellow card) 58'	Stadium: Volodymyr Boiko Stadium; Attendance: 8,121; Referee: Yevhen Aranovsky

4 May 2019 27	Shakhtar Donetsk	5 – 0	Lviv	Kharkiv
19:30 EEST (UTC+3)	Nem (yellow card) 9' (goal) 51'; Alvaro 17' (o.g.); Bolbat 55'; Kovalenko 62'; Patrick 76'	Summary	Borzenko (yellow card) 41'	Stadium: OSC Metalist; Attendance: 4,710; Referee: Yaroslav Kozyk

11 May 2019 28	Shakhtar Donetsk	2 – 1	Oleksandriya	Kharkiv
19:30 EEST (UTC+3)	Khocholava 4'; Bolbat (yellow card) 13'; Moraes 59'; Stepanenko (yellow card) 87'	Summary	Banada 32'; Sitalo (yellow card) 46'; Stetskov (yellow card) 54'; Bukhal (yellow card) 90+1'	Stadium: OSC Metalist; Attendance: 5,174; Referee: Yuriy Mozharovskyi

19 May 2019 29	Zorya Luhansk	0 – 1	Shakhtar Donetsk	Zaporizhia
17:00 EEST (UTC+3)	Mykhaylychenko (yellow card) 35'; Tymchyk (yellow card) 83'	Summary	Kovalenko (yellow card) 7'; Moraes 11' (yellow card) 29'; Stepanenko (yellow card) 72'	Stadium: Slavutych-Arena; Attendance: 7,213; Referee: Mykola Balakin

22 May 2019 30	Shakhtar Donetsk	1 – 1	Dynamo Kyiv	Kharkiv
19:30 EEST (UTC+3)	Khocholava (yellow card) 20' (yellow-red card) 63'; Patrick (yellow card) 33'; Fernando (yellow card) 35'; Tetê 50' (yellow card) 55'; Dentinho (yellow card) 77'	Summary	Tsyhankov (yellow card) 22' (goal) 36' (pen.); Shepelyev (yellow card) 32'; Shabanov (yellow card) 41' (yellow-red card) 45'; Andriyevskyi (yellow card) 83'; Shaparenko (yellow card) 85'; Sidcley (yellow card) 88'	Stadium: OSC Metalist; Attendance: 30,315; Referee: Yaroslav Kozyk

26 May 2019 31	Shakhtar Donetsk	4 – 0	Mariupol	Kharkiv
19:30 EEST (UTC+3)	Dentinho 52', 57', 80'; Tetê 78'	Summary		Stadium: OSC Metalist; Attendance: 5,297; Referee: Andriy Kovalenko

30 May 2019 32	Lviv	0 – 3	Shakhtar Donetsk	Lviv
19:30 EEST (UTC+3)	Pedro (yellow card) 42'; Marthã (yellow card) 61'	Summary	Antônio (yellow card) 51'; Dentinho 65'; Stepanenko (yellow card) 73' (goal) 78'; Matviyenko 85'	Stadium: Ukraina Stadium; Attendance: 2,168; Referee: Maksym Kozyryanskyi

=== Ukrainian Cup ===
31 October 2018 Round of 16	Shakhtar Donetsk	3 – 2	Olimpik Donetsk	Kharkiv
19:00 EEST (UTC+3)	Khocholava (yellow card) 43'; Moraes 63' (pen.); Totovytskyi 66'; Danchenko 83'	Summary	Hryshko (yellow card) 30' (yellow-red card) 62'; Bilonoh 55' (pen.); Zubeyko (yellow card) 59'; Koltsov (yellow card) 79'; Gai 81'	Stadium: OSC Metalist; Attendance: 3,505; Referee: Mykola Balakin

7 April 2019 Quarter-final	Shakhtar Donetsk	1 – 1 (4 – 3 p)	Dynamo Kyiv	Kharkiv
17:00 EEST (UTC+3)	Taison (yellow card) 19'; Stepanenko (yellow card) 39'; Alan Patrick (yellow card) 43'; Moraes 57' (yellow card) 62' (yellow-red card) 67'; Solomon (yellow card) 90'; Maycon (yellow card) 104'; Bolbat (yellow card) 116'	Summary	Harmash 9' (yellow card) 61' (red card) 62'; Kędziora (yellow card) 23'; Shaparenko (yellow card) 47'; Burda (yellow card) 60'; Shepelyev (yellow card) 77'; Sidcley (yellow card) 86'; Buyalskyi (yellow card) 90'	Stadium: OSC Metalist; Attendance: 29,112; Referee: Maksym Kozyryanskyi
	Penalties
	Ismaily (penalty scored); Solomon (penalty missed); Maycon (penalty scored); Nem (penalty scored); Kovalenko (penalty scored)		Tsyhankov (penalty scored); Sidcley (penalty scored); Kędziora (penalty scored); Mykolenko (penalty missed); Shepelyev (penalty missed)

17 April 2019 Semi-final	SC Dnipro-1	0 – 2	Shakhtar Donetsk	Dnipro
18:30 EEST (UTC+3)	Kohut (yellow card) 62'	Summary	Dentinho 86'; Antônio 90+5'	Stadium: Dnipro-Arena; Attendance: 18,462; Referee: Ihor Paskhal

15 May 2019 Final	Shakhtar Donetsk	4 – 0	Inhulets Petrove	Zaporizhia
21:00 EEST (UTC+3)	Tetê 28', 39'; Moraes 45+2'; Kovalenko (yellow card) 48'; Solomon 64'; Nem (yellow card) 89'	Summary	Lupashko (yellow card) 45+2'; Klymenko (yellow card) 57'	Stadium: Slavutych-Arena; Attendance: 11,100; Referee: Yevhen Aranovvsky

=== UEFA Champions League ===
==== Group stage ====
Pos	Team	Pld	W	D	L	GF	GA	GD	Pts	Qualification	MCI	LYO	SHK	HOF
1	(England) Manchester City	6	4	1	1	16	6	+10	13	Advance to knockout phase	—	1–2	6–0	2–1
2	(France) Lyon	6	1	5	0	12	11	+1	8	Advance to knockout phase	2–2	—	2–2	2–2
3	(Ukraine) Shakhtar Donetsk	6	1	3	2	8	16	−8	6	Transfer to Europa League	0–3	1–1	—	2–2
4	(Germany) TSG Hoffenheim	6	0	3	3	11	14	−3	3		1–2	3–3	2–3	—

Source: UEFA

19 September 2018 1	Shakhtar Donetsk (Ukraine)	2–2	(Germany) 1899 Hoffenheim	Kharkiv, Ukraine
19:55 EEST (UTC+3)	Ismaily 27'; Moraes (yellow card) 45'; Patrick (yellow card) 52'; Rakitskiy (yellow card) 77'; Maycon 81'	Report	Grillitsch 6' (yellow card) 30'; Nordtveit 38'	Stadium: Metalist Stadium; Attendance: 28,336; Referee: Jakob Kehlet (Denmark)

2 October 2018 2	Lyon (France)	2–2	(Ukraine) Shakhtar Donetsk	Décines-Charpieu, France
22:00 EEST (UTC+3)	Fekir (yellow card) 46'; Dembélé 70'; Dubois 72'	Report	Moraes 45', 55'	Stadium: Parc Olympique Lyonnais; Attendance: 0 Referee: Andris Treimanis (Latvia)

23 October 2018 3	Shakhtar Donetsk (Ukraine)	0–3	(England) Manchester City	Kharkiv, Ukraine
22:00 EEST (UTC+3)	Kryvtsov (yellow card) 87'	Report	D. Silva 30'; Laporte 35'; B. Silva 71'; Otamendi (yellow card) 90+4'	Stadium: Metalist Stadium; Attendance: 37,106; Referee: Carlos del Cerro Grande (Spain)

7 November 2018 4	Manchester City (England)	6–0	(Ukraine) Shakhtar Donetsk	Manchester, England
22:00 EEST (UTC+3)	D. Silva 13'; Jesus 24' (pen.), 72' (pen.), 90+2'; Sterling 49'; Mahrez 84'	Report		Stadium: City of Manchester Stadium; Attendance: 52,286; Referee: Viktor Kassai (Hungary)

27 November 2018 5	1899 Hoffenheim (Germany)	2–3	(Ukraine) Shakhtar Donetsk	Sinsheim, Germany
22:00 EEST (UTC+3)	Kramarić 17'; Zuber 40'; Szalai (yellow card) 58' (yellow-red card) 60'; Vogt (yellow card) 89'; Demirbay (yellow card) 90+6'	Report	Ismaily 14'; Taison 15', 90+2'; Stepanenko (yellow card) 37'; Matviyenko (yellow card) 68'; Kryvtsov (yellow card) 90+1'; Danchenko (yellow card) 90+4'; Pyatov (yellow card) 90+6'	Stadium: Rhein-Neckar-Arena, Attendance: 22,920; Referee: Ivan Kružliak (Slovakia)

12 December 2018 6	Shakhtar Donetsk (Ukraine)	1–1	(France) Lyon	Kyiv, Ukraine
22:00 EEST (UTC+3)	Júnior Moraes 22'; Bolbat (yellow card) 87'	Report	Marçal (yellow card) 8'; Fekir 65' (yellow card) 68'	Stadium: NSC Olimpiyskiy; Attendance: 38,916; Referee: Björn Kuipers (Netherlands)

=== UEFA Europa League ===
==== Knockout phase ====
===== Round of 32 =====
14 February 2019 First Leg	Shakhtar Donetsk (Ukraine)	2–2	(Germany) Eintracht Frankfurt	Kharkiv, Ukraine
21:00 (22:00 EET)	Stepanenko (yellow card) 6' (yellow-red card) 11'; Marlos 10' (pen.); Taison 67'; Kryvtsov (yellow card) 77'	Report	Hinteregger 7'; Fernandes (yellow card) 19'; Kostić 50'; Gaćinović (yellow card) 84'	Stadium: Metalist Stadium; Attendance: 13,059; Referee: Anthony Taylor (England)

21 February 2019 Second Leg	Eintracht Frankfurt (Germany)	4–1 (6–3 agg.)	(Ukraine) Shakhtar Donetsk	Frankfurt, Germany
18:55 (19:55 EET)	Jović 23'; Haller 27' (pen.), 80' (yellow card) 68'; Abraham (yellow card) 39'; Rode (yellow card) 60'; Rebić 88'	Report	Matviyenko (yellow card) 26'; Moraes (yellow card) 33' (goal) 64'	Stadium: Commerzbank-Arena; Attendance: 48,558; Referee: Antonio Mateu Lahoz (Spain)

== Squad statistics ==
As of match played 30 May 2019

=== Appearances and goals ===
No.	Pos	Nat	Player	Total		Premier League		Ukrainian Cup		UEFA Champions League		UEFA Europa League		Supercup	
No.	Pos	Nat	Player	Apps	Goals	Apps	Goals	Apps	Goals	Apps	Goals	Apps	Goals	Apps	Goals
1	GK	(Ukraine) UKR	Oleksiy Shevchenko	5	0	3	0	2	0	0	0	0	0	0	0
2	DF	(Ukraine) UKR	Bohdan Butko	19	0	12+2	0	0	0	1+2	0	2	0	0	0
4	DF	(Ukraine) UKR	Serhiy Kryvtsov	32	0	20+1	0	4	0	5	0	1	0	1	0
5	DF	(Georgia (country)) GEO	Davit Khocholava	33	2	25	2	2+1	0	3	0	2	0	0	0
6	MF	(Ukraine) UKR	Taras Stepanenko	36	4	22+4	4	2	0	6	0	1	0	1	0
7	MF	(Brazil) BRA	Taison	35	6	23+2	3	3	0	5	2	2	1	0	0
8	FW	(Nigeria) NGR	Olarenwaju Kayode	16	1	3+7	1	1+1	0	0+3	0	0+1	0	0	0
9	MF	(Brazil) BRA	Dentinho	16	5	4+8	4	0+2	1	0+2	0	0	0	0	0
10	FW	(Ukraine) UKR	Júnior Moraes	39	26	27	19	3	3	6	3	2	1	1	0
11	MF	(Ukraine) UKR	Marlos	26	10	16+3	9	1	0	3	0	2	1	1	0
14	MF	(Brazil) BRA	Tetê	10	4	4+4	2	2	2	0	0	0	0	0	0
15	DF	(Ukraine) UKR	Valeriy Bondarenko	1	0	1	0	0	0	0	0	0	0	0	0
17	MF	(Ukraine) UKR	Maksym Malyshev	4	0	0+3	0	0	0	0	0	0+1	0	0	0
18	DF	(Ukraine) UKR	Ivan Ordets	2	0	1+1	0	0	0	0	0	0	0	0	0
19	MF	(Israel) ISR	Manor Solomon	16	1	6+5	0	1+2	1	0	0	1+1	0	0	0
21	MF	(Brazil) BRA	Alan Patrick	38	2	23+4	2	3	0	2+3	0	2	0	1	0
22	DF	(Ukraine) UKR	Mykola Matviyenko	27	3	12+6	3	3	0	5	0	1	0	0	0
23	MF	(Brazil) BRA	Wellington Nem	21	3	14+1	3	1+3	0	1+1	0	0	0	0	0
27	MF	(Brazil) BRA	Maycon	30	5	11+10	4	0+2	0	5+1	1	0+1	0	0	0
28	MF	(Brazil) BRA	Marquinhos Cipriano	5	0	1+4	0	0	0	0	0	0	0	0	0
29	MF	(Ukraine) UKR	Andriy Totovytskyi	8	1	1+5	0	1	1	0	0	0	0	0+1	0
30	GK	(Ukraine) UKR	Andriy Pyatov	38	0	27	0	2	0	6	0	2	0	1	0
31	DF	(Brazil) BRA	Ismaily	39	2	27	0	3	0	6	2	2	0	1	0
50	MF	(Ukraine) UKR	Serhiy Bolbat	30	3	17+3	3	3	0	2+2	0	0+2	0	0+1	0
55	GK	(Ukraine) UKR	Oleh Kudryk	1	0	1	0	0	0	0	0	0	0	0	0
68	GK	(Ukraine) UKR	Anatoliy Trubin	1	0	1	0	0	0	0	0	0	0	0	0
74	MF	(Ukraine) UKR	Viktor Kovalenko	37	7	16+9	7	3	0	4+2	0	2	0	1	0
77	DF	(Ukraine) UKR	Valeriy Bondar	1	0	0+1	0	0	0	0	0	0	0	0	0
88	MF	(Brazil) BRA	Marcos Antônio	10	1	7+1	0	1+1	1	0	0	0	0	0	0
99	MF	(Brazil) BRA	Fernando	22	2	7+11	2	1	0	1+1	0	0	0	1	0
Players away on loan:
91	MF	(Ukraine) UKR	Mykhailo Mudryk	1	0	0	0	0+1	0	0	0	0	0	0	0
Players who left Shakhtar Donetsk during the season:
44	DF	(Ukraine) UKR	Yaroslav Rakitskiy	16	1	11	1	0	0	4	0	0	0	1	0
94	DF	(Ukraine) UKR	Oleh Danchenko	12	1	8+1	0	1	1	1	0	0	0	1	0

=== Goalscorers ===
Place	Position	Nation	Number	Name	Premier League	Ukrainian Cup	Champions League	Europa League	Super Cup	Total
1	FW	(Ukraine)	10	Júnior Moraes	19	3	3	1	0	26
2	MF	(Ukraine)	11	Marlos	9	0	0	1	0	10
3	MF	(Ukraine)	74	Viktor Kovalenko	7	0	0	0	0	7
4	MF	(Brazil)	7	Taison	3	0	2	1	0	6
5	MF	(Brazil)	27	Maycon	4	0	1	0	0	5
5	MF	(Brazil)	9	Dentinho	4	1	0	0	0	5
7	MF	(Brazil)	14	Tetê	2	2	0	0	0	4
7	MF	(Ukraine)	6	Taras Stepanenko	4	0	0	0	0	4
7				Own goal	4	0	0	0	0	4
10	MF	(Ukraine)	50	Serhiy Bolbat	3	0	0	0	0	3
10	MF	(Brazil)	23	Wellington Nem	3	0	0	0	0	3
10	DF	(Ukraine)	22	Mykola Matviyenko	3	0	0	0	0	3
13	MF	(Brazil)	99	Fernando	2	0	0	0	0	2
13	DF	(Brazil)	31	Ismaily	0	0	2	0	0	2
13	MF	(Brazil)	21	Alan Patrick	2	0	0	0	0	2
13	DF	(Georgia (country))	5	Davit Khocholava	2	0	0	0	0	2
17	DF	(Ukraine)	44	Yaroslav Rakitskiy	1	0	0	0	0	1
17	MF	(Ukraine)	29	Andriy Totovytskyi	0	1	0	0	0	1
17	DF	(Ukraine)	94	Oleh Danchenko	0	1	0	0	0	1
17	FW	(Nigeria)	88	Olarenwaju Kayode	1	0	0	0	0	1
17	MF	(Brazil)	88	Marcos Antônio	0	1	0	0	0	1
17	MF	(Israel)	19	Manor Solomon	0	1	0	0	0	1
TOTALS					73	10	8	3	0	94

=== Clean sheets ===
No.	Player	Ukrainian Premier League	Ukrainian Cup	UEFA Champions League	UEFA Europa League	Ukrainian Super Cup	TOTAL
1	(Ukraine) Oleksiy Shevchenko	3	1	0	0	0	4
30	(Ukraine) Andriy Pyatov	18	1	0	0	0	19
55	(Ukraine) Oleh Kudryk	1	0	0	0	0	1
68	(Ukraine) Anatoliy Trubin	1	0	0	0	0	1
Totals		23	2	0	0	0	25

=== Disciplinary record ===
Number	Nation	Position	Name	Premier League		Ukrainian Cup		Champions League		Europa League		Super Cup		Total	
Number	Nation	Position	Name	Yellow card	Red card	Yellow card	Red card	Yellow card	Red card	Yellow card	Red card	Yellow card	Red card	Yellow card	Red card
1	(Ukraine)	GK	Oleksiy Shevchenko	0	0	0	0	0	0	0	0	0	0	0	0
2	(Ukraine)	DF	Bohdan Butko	0	0	0	0	0	0	0	0	0	0	0	0
4	(Ukraine)	DF	Serhiy Kryvtsov	6	0	0	0	2	0	1	0	0	0	9	0
5	(Georgia (country))	DF	Davit Khocholava	6	1	1	0	0	0	0	0	0	0	7	1
6	(Ukraine)	MF	Taras Stepanenko	9	0	1	0	1	0	2	1	0	0	13	1
7	(Brazil)	MF	Taison	4	0	1	0	0	0	0	0	0	0	5	0
8	(Nigeria)	FW	Olarenwaju Kayode	0	1	0	0	0	0	0	0	0	0	0	1
9	(Brazil)	MF	Dentinho	2	0	0	0	0	0	0	0	0	0	2	0
10	(Ukraine)	FW	Júnior Moraes	9	0	2	1	1	0	1	0	1	0	14	1
11	(Ukraine)	MF	Marlos	3	0	0	0	0	0	0	0	0	0	3	0
14	(Brazil)	MF	Tetê	1	0	0	0	0	0	0	0	0	0	1	0
15	(Ukraine)	DF	Valeriy Bondarenko	0	0	0	0	0	0	0	0	0	0	0	0
17	(Ukraine)	MF	Maksym Malyshev	0	0	0	0	0	0	0	0	0	0	0	0
18	(Ukraine)	DF	Ivan Ordets	0	0	0	0	0	0	0	0	0	0	0	0
19	(Israel)	MF	Manor Solomon	0	0	1	0	0	0	0	0	0	0	1	0
21	(Brazil)	MF	Alan Patrick	5	0	1	0	1	0	0	0	0	0	7	0
22	(Ukraine)	DF	Mykola Matviyenko	1	0	0	0	1	0	1	0	0	0	3	0
23	(Brazil)	MF	Wellington Nem	2	0	1	0	0	0	0	0	0	0	3	0
27	(Brazil)	MF	Maycon	4	0	1	0	0	0	0	0	0	0	5	0
28	(Brazil)	MF	Marquinhos Cipriano	0	0	0	0	0	0	0	0	0	0	0	0
29	(Ukraine)	MF	Andriy Totovytskyi	0	0	0	0	0	0	0	0	1	0	1	0
30	(Ukraine)	GK	Andriy Pyatov	0	0	0	0	1	0	0	0	0	0	1	0
31	(Brazil)	DF	Ismaily	2	0	0	0	0	0	0	0	0	1	2	1
44	(Ukraine)	DF	Yaroslav Rakitskiy	6	0	0	0	1	0	0	0	0	0	7	0
50	(Ukraine)	MF	Serhiy Bolbat	2	0	1	0	1	0	0	0	0	0	4	0
55	(Ukraine)	GK	Oleh Kudryk	0	0	0	0	0	0	0	0	0	0	0	0
68	(Ukraine)	GK	Anatoliy Trubin	0	0	0	0	0	0	0	0	0	0	0	0
74	(Ukraine)	MF	Viktor Kovalenko	3	0	1	0	0	0	0	0	0	0	4	0
77	(Ukraine)	DF	Valeriy Bondar	0	0	0	0	0	0	0	0	0	0	0	0
88	(Brazil)	MF	Marcos Antônio	1	0	0	0	0	0	0	0	0	0	1	0
91	(Ukraine)	MF	Mykhailo Mudryk	0	0	0	0	0	0	0	0	0	0	0	0
94	(Ukraine)	DF	Oleh Danchenko	2	0	0	0	0	0	0	0	1	0	3	0
99	(Brazil)	MF	Fernando	2	0	0	0	1	0	0	0	1	0	4	0
			TOTALS	70	2	11	1	10	0	5	1	4	1	100	5

== Notes ==
4. Shakhtar Donetsk play their home matches at Metalist Stadium, Kharkiv instead of their regular stadium, Donbas Arena, Donetsk, due to the War in Donbas.
