= Oleksiy Shevchenko =

Ukrainian footballer

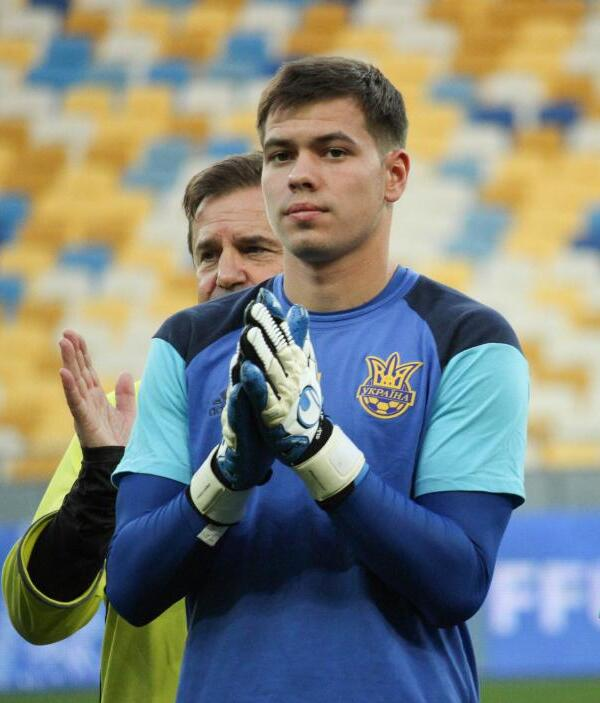
- Shevchenko with Ukraine in 2016

Personal information
- Full name: Oleksiy Mykolayovych Shevchenko
- Date of birth: 24 February 1992 (age 34)
- Place of birth: Dnipropetrovsk, Ukraine
- Height: 1.88 m (6 ft 2 in)
- Position: Goalkeeper

Team information
- Current team: Telavi
- Number: 1

Youth career
- 2004–2008: Inter Dnipropetrovsk

Senior career*
Years	Team	Apps	(Gls)
2008–2013	Metalurh Zaporizhzhia	13	(0)
2008–2012	→ Metalurh-2 Zaporizhzhia	46	(0)
2013–2016	Dynamo Kyiv	0	(0)
2014	→ Hoverla Uzhhorod (loan)	1	(0)
2014	→ Olimpik Donetsk (loan)	0	(0)
2015	→ Torpedo Kutaisi (loan)	4	(0)
2015	→ Dila Gori (loan)	10	(0)
2016–2017	Zorya Luhansk	29	(0)
2018	Karpaty Lviv	10	(0)
2018–2023	Shakhtar Donetsk	6	(0)
2023–2024	Chornomorets Odesa	4	(0)
2024	Zagłębie Sosnowiec	6	(0)
2025	Okzhetpes	1	(0)
2025–	Telavi	23	(0)

International career
2010	Ukraine U18	1	(0)
2012	Ukraine U20	3	(0)
2012–2013	Ukraine U21	8	(0)
- * Club domestic league appearances and goals as of 11 July 2026

Oleksiy Mykolayovych Shevchenko (Ukrainian: Олексій Миколайович Шевченко; born 24 February 1992) is a Ukrainian professional footballer who plays as a goalkeeper for Georgian 2nd division side Telavi.

== Career ==
Shevchenko is product of youth team system FC Inter Dnipropetrovsk. Made his debut for FC Metalurh entering as a full-time playing against Lviv on 13 October 2011 in Ukrainian First League.

On 30 August 2013, he signed a five-year contract with Ukrainian side Dynamo Kyiv.

On 17 June 2018, Oleksiy joined Shakhtar Donetsk on a five-year deal.

== International career ==
Shevchenko got his first call up to the senior Ukraine side for 2018 FIFA World Cup qualifiers against Turkey and Kosovo in October 2016.

== Career statistics ==
As of match played 1 April 2024

Appearances and goals by club, season and competition
Club	Season	League	League		National cup		Europe		Other		Total	
Club	Season	League	Apps	Goals	Apps	Goals	Apps	Goals	Apps	Goals	Apps	Goals
Metalurh-2 Zaporizhzhia	2008–09	Ukrainian Second League	2	0	0	0	—		—		2	0
Metalurh-2 Zaporizhzhia	2009–10	Ukrainian Second League	21	0	0	0	—		—		21	0
Metalurh-2 Zaporizhzhia	2010–11	Ukrainian Second League	17	0	0	0	—		—		17	0
Metalurh-2 Zaporizhzhia	2011–12	Ukrainian Second League	6	0	0	0	—		—		6	0
Metalurh-2 Zaporizhzhia	Total		46	0	0	0	—		—		46	0
Metalurh Zaporizhzhia	2011–12	Ukrainian First League	4	0	0	0	—		—		4	0
Metalurh Zaporizhzhia	2012–13	Ukrainian Premier League	9	0	1	0	—		—		10	0
Metalurh Zaporizhzhia	2013–14	Ukrainian Premier League	0	0	0	0	—		—		0	0
Metalurh Zaporizhzhia	Total		13	0	1	0	—		—		14	0
Dynamo Kyiv	2013–14	Ukrainian Premier League	0	0	0	0	0	0	0	0	0	0
Hoverla Uzhhorod (loan)	2013–14	Ukrainian Premier League	1	0	—		—		—		1	0
Olimpik Donetsk (loan)	2014–15	Ukrainian Premier League	0	0	0	0	—		—		0	0
Torpedo Kutaisi (loan)	2014–15	Umaglesi Liga	4	0	—		—		—		4	0
Dila Gori (loan)	2015–16	Umaglesi Liga	10	0	1	0	2 (Note: Appearances in UEFA Champions League)	0	1 (Note: Appearance in Georgian Super Cup)	0	14	0
Zorya Luhansk	2015–16	Ukrainian Premier League	1	0	1	0	—		—		2	0
Zorya Luhansk	2016–17	Ukrainian Premier League	25	0	1	0	5 (Note: Appearances in UEFA Europa League)	0	—		31	0
Zorya Luhansk	2017–18	Ukrainian Premier League	3	0	0	0	0	0	—		3	0
Zorya Luhansk	Total		29	0	2	0	5	0	—		36	0
Karpaty Lviv	2017–18	Ukrainian Premier League	10	0	—		—		—		10	0
Shakhtar Donetsk	2018–19	Ukrainian Premier League	3	0	2	0	0	0	0	0	5	0
Shakhtar Donetsk	2019–20	Ukrainian Premier League	2	0	0	0	0	0	0	0	2	0
Shakhtar Donetsk	2020–21	Ukrainian Premier League	0	0	0	0	0	0	0	0	0	0
Shakhtar Donetsk	2021–22	Ukrainian Premier League	0	0	0	0	1	0	0	0	1	0
Shakhtar Donetsk	2022–23	Ukrainian Premier League	1	0	0	0	0	0	0	0	1	0
Shakhtar Donetsk	Total		6	0	2	0	1	0	0	0	9	0
Chornomorets Odesa	2023–24	Ukrainian Premier League	4	0	1	0	—		—		5	0
Zagłębie Sosnowiec	2023–24	I liga	6	0	—		—		—		6	0
Career total			129	0	7	0	8	0	1	0	145	0

== Honours ==
Shakhtar Donetsk

- Ukrainian Premier League: 2018–19, 2019–20, 2022–23
- Ukrainian Cup: 2018–19
