= Marquinhos Cipriano =

Brazilian footballer

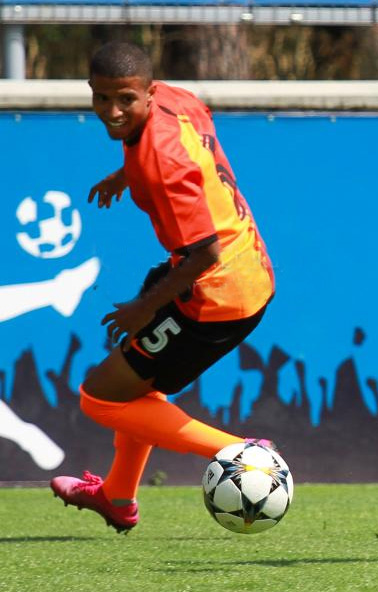
- Cipriano with Shakhtar U-21 in 2019

Personal information
- Full name: Marcos Robson Cipriano
- Date of birth: 9 February 1999 (age 27)
- Place of birth: Catanduva, Brazil
- Height: 1.79 m (5 ft 10 in)
- Position: Left-back

Team information
- Current team: Sion
- Number: 6

Youth career
- 2013–2015: Desportivo Brasil
- 2015–2018: São Paulo

Senior career*
Years	Team	Apps	(Gls)
2018	São Paulo	1	(0)
2018–2023	Shakhtar Donetsk	25	(1)
2021–2022	→ Sion (loan)	33	(0)
2022–2023	→ Cruzeiro (loan)	10	(0)
2023	Avaí	6	(0)
2023–2024	Omonia	25	(2)
2024–	Sion	31	(0)

International career
2017–2019	Brazil U20	11	(0)
- * Club domestic league appearances and goals as of 28 September 2026

Marcos Robson Cipriano (born 2 February 1999), simply known as Marquinhos Cipriano, is a Brazilian professional footballer who plays for Sion as a left-back.

== Club career ==
A native of Catanduva, Cipriano joined the youth academy of Desportivo Brasil at the age of 14 after an unsuccessful trial with Santos FC. While playing for Desportivo Brasil, he was scouted by Grêmio, Santos, Palmeiras and Corinthians; although he wanted to play for his favourite club São Paulo. In September 2015, he was bought by São Paulo Futebol Clube for $1 million. His contract termination fee was set at $120 million. Soon after joining the club, São Paulo rejected a $7 million offer from Spanish club Atlético Madrid to secure his services. He emerged as the top scorer of the U-17 Campeonato Paulista of 2016 with 21 goals and was subsequently promoted to the under-20 team. On 16 January 2018, Cipriano was called to the senior team for a match against São Bento in the Paulista. He made his debut in the match, coming as a substitute for Júnior Tavares in the 2–0 defeat.

On 10 July 2018, Cipriano moved abroad and joined Ukrainian club Shakhtar Donetsk on a five-year deal. He previously signed a pre-season contract with the club in January 2018.

== Personal life ==
Cipriano has a twin brother named Mateus who is a volleyball player. He also has a sister named Monique.

== International career ==
Cipriano has been capped by Brazil at under-20 level, representing the team at 2017 Toulon Tournament.

== Career statistics ==
As of 7 December 2022

Appearances and goals by club, season and competition
Club	Season	League			Cup (Note: Includes Swiss Cup)		Continental		Other		Total	
Club	Season	Division	Apps	Goals	Apps	Goals	Apps	Goals	Apps	Goals	Apps	Goals
São Paulo	2018	Série A	0	0	0	0	0	0	1 (Note: Appearance in Paulista)	0	1	0
Shakhtar Donetsk	2018–19	Ukrainian Premier League	6	0	0	0	0	0	0	0	6	0
Shakhtar Donetsk	2019–20	Ukrainian Premier League	12	1	0	0	0	0	0	0	12	1
Shakhtar Donetsk	2020–21	Ukrainian Premier League	8	0	0	0	0	0	0	0	8	0
Shakhtar Donetsk	Total		26	1	0	0	0	0	0	0	26	1
Sion (loan)	2021–22	Super League	32	0	1	0	—		—		33	0
Cruzeiro	2022	Série B	7	0	0	0	—		0	0	7	0
Career total			65	1	1	0	0	0	1	0	67	1

== Honours ==
=== Club ===
Shakhtar Donetsk

- Ukrainian Premier League

Winner (1): 2018–19

- Ukrainian Cup

Winner (1): 2018–19
