= Marcos Antônio (footballer, born 2000) =

Brazilian footballer

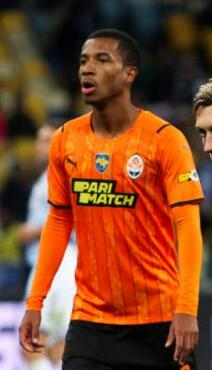
- Antônio with Shakhtar Donetsk in 2021

Personal information
- Full name: Marcos Antônio Silva Santos
- Date of birth: 13 June 2000 (age 26)
- Place of birth: Poções, Brazil
- Height: 1.66 m (5 ft 5 in)
- Position: Midfielder

Team information
- Current team: São Paulo
- Number: 8

Youth career
- 2014–2018: Athletico Paranaense

Senior career*
| Years | Team | Apps | (Gls) |
| 2018–2019 | Estoril | 3 | (0) |
| 2019–2022 | Shakhtar Donetsk | 69 | (5) |
| 2022–2026 | Lazio | 16 | (1) |
| 2023–2024 | → PAOK (loan) | 11 | (2) |
| 2024–2026 | → São Paulo (loan) | 54 | (0) |
| 2026– | São Paulo | 11 | (0) |

International career^{‡}
| 2017 | Brazil U17 | 16 | (2) |
| 2018–2019 | Brazil U20 | 11 | (0) |
| 2020 | Brazil U23 | 2 | (0) |
- * Club domestic league appearances and goals as of 6 April 2026 ‡ National team caps and goals as of 20 November 2020

Marcos Antônio Silva Santos (born 13 June 2000) is a Brazilian professional footballer who plays as a midfielder for Campeonato Brasileiro Série A club São Paulo.

== Club career ==
Born in Poções, Antônio joined the youth setup of Athletico Paranaense in 2014.

On 7 July 2018, he moved to the Portuguese club Estoril and signed a professional contract. On 30 September, he made his debut in a 1–0 win against CF Vasco da Gama Vidigueira, in Taça de Portugal.

On 19 February 2019, Antônio joined the Ukrainian club Shakhtar Donetsk. On March 13, 2020, he scored his first goal in the Europa League in the 2-1 Shakhtar away victory against VfL Wolfsburg. During his time at the club, he was described as the "engine" and "master" of Shakhtar's midfield.

On 20 June 2022, Antônio signed for Lazio. He struggled to establish himself in the starting eleven during his first season. In July 2023, with news of him leaving the club, he was racially abused by a Lazio fan. Antônio put out a statement in response to the claim.

On 1 September 2023, Antônio joined PAOK on loan with an option to buy.

On 23 July 2024, Antônio was announced at São Paulo on a one year loan contract. On 1 July 2025, his loan contract was renewed for another season, with an option to buy added to his contract.

== International career ==
Antônio played for the under-17 team at the 2017 South American U-17 Championship. He also represented the side at the 2017 FIFA U-17 World Cup held in India, and scored a goal against Honduras in the Round of 16.

== Career statistics ==
=== Club ===
As of match played 20 May 2024

Appearances and goals by club, season and competition
| Club | Season | League | | | National cup | | League cup | | Continental | | Other | | Total | |
| Club | Season | Division | Apps | Goals | Apps | Goals | Apps | Goals | Apps | Goals | Apps | Goals | Apps | Goals |
|---|---|---|---|---|---|---|---|---|---|---|---|---|---|---|
| Estoril | 2018–19 | LigaPro | 3 | 0 | 2 | 0 | 1 | 0 | – | | – | | 6 | 0 |
| Shakhtar Donetsk | 2018–19 | Ukrainian Premier League | 8 | 0 | 2 | 1 | – | | 0 | 0 | 0 | 0 | 10 | 1 |
| Shakhtar Donetsk | 2019–20 | Ukrainian Premier League | 21 | 2 | 1 | 0 | – | | 9 | 1 | 0 | 0 | 31 | 3 |
| Shakhtar Donetsk | 2020–21 | Ukrainian Premier League | 23 | 2 | 1 | 0 | – | | 8 | 0 | 1 | 0 | 33 | 2 |
| Shakhtar Donetsk | 2021–22 | Ukrainian Premier League | 17 | 1 | 1 | 1 | – | | 9 | 1 | 1 | 0 | 28 | 3 |
| Shakhtar Donetsk | Total | | 69 | 5 | 5 | 2 | – | | 26 | 2 | 2 | 0 | 102 | 9 |
| Lazio | 2022–23 | Serie A | 16 | 1 | 2 | 0 | – | | 4 | 0 | – | | 22 | 1 |
| PAOK (loan) | 2023–24 | Superleague Greece | 11 | 2 | 5 | 1 | – | | 1 | 0 | – | | 17 | 3 |
| Career total | | | 99 | 8 | 14 | 3 | 1 | 0 | 31 | 2 | 2 | 0 | 147 | 13 |

== Honours ==
Athletico Paranaense

- Campeonato Paranaense: 2018

Shakhtar Donetsk

- Ukrainian Premier League: 2018–19, 2019–20
- Ukrainian Cup: 2018–19
- Ukrainian Super Cup: 2021

PAOK

- Super League Greece: 2023–24

Brazil U17

- South American U-17 Championship: 2017

Individual

- South American Youth Championship Team of the Tournament: 2019
