= Ilya Vasilevich =

Belarusian footballer

Personal information
- Full name: Ilya Syarheyevich Vasilevich
- Date of birth: 14 April 2000 (age 26)
- Place of birth: Ivatsevichy, Brest Region, Belarus
- Height: 1.79 m (5 ft 10 1/2 in)
- Position: Forward

Team information
- Current team: Sokol Saratov
- Number: 23

Youth career
- 2013–2017: Fortuna Minsk

Senior career*
Years	Team	Apps	(Gls)
2017–2018	Baranovichi	9	(1)
2018–2019	Shakhtar Donetsk	0	(0)
2019–2023	BATE Borisov	46	(4)
2020	→ Slavia Mozyr (loan)	10	(0)
2024–2025	Torpedo-BelAZ Zhodino	49	(8)
2026	Zimbru Chișinău	8	(0)
2026–	Sokol Saratov	13	(1)

International career^{‡}
2016–2017	Belarus U17	8	(2)
2017–2018	Belarus U19	10	(1)
2022	Belarus U21	4	(2)
- * Club domestic league appearances and goals as of 15 November 2026 ‡ National team caps and goals as of 8 June 2022

Ilya Vasilevich (Belarusian: Ілья Васілевіч; born 14 April 2000) is a Belarusian professional footballer who plays as a forward for Russian Second League club Sokol Saratov.

== Career ==
Vasilevich is a product of Fortuna Minsk youth sportive school system. He spent his career in the Belarusian First League FC Baranovichi, but in January 2018 signed a 3 years deal with the Ukrainian Premier League FC Shakhtar Donetsk, that took an effect on April 15, 2018, the day, after Vasilevich's adulthood.

=== Club ===
As of 4 June 2019

Club	Season	League			Cup		Champions League		Europa League		Super Cup		Total	
Club	Season	Division	Apps	Goals	Apps	Goals	Apps	Goals	Apps	Goals	Apps	Goals	Apps	Goals
Baranovichi	2017	Belarusian First League	9	1	0	0	0	0	0	0	0	0	9	1
Total			9	1	0	0	0	0	0	0	0	0	9	1
Shakhtar	2017–18	Ukrainian Premier League	0	0	0	0	0	0	0	0	0	0	0	0
Shakhtar	2018–19	Ukrainian Premier League	0	0	0	0	0	0	0	0	0	0	0	0
Total			0	0	0	0	0	0	0	0	0	0	0	0
Career total			9	1	0	0	0	0	0	0	0	0	9	1

== Honours ==
BATE Borisov

- Belarusian Super Cup winner: 2022
