= Volodymyr Hrachov =

Ukrainian footballer

Personal information
- Full name: Volodymyr Serhiyovych Hrachov
- Date of birth: 24 December 1997 (age 28)
- Place of birth: Avdiivka, Ukraine
- Height: 1.73 m (5 ft 8 in)
- Position: Defender

Team information
- Current team: Vilkhivtsi
- Number: 33

Youth career
- 2010–2014: Shakhtar Donetsk

Senior career*
Years	Team	Apps	(Gls)
2014–2018	Shakhtar Donetsk	0	(0)
2019–2020	Ypsonas	10	(0)
2020	Veles Moscow	6	(0)
2021	Kramatorsk	3	(0)
2023–2024	Nyva Vinnytsia	23	(0)
2024	Khust	1	(0)
2024–	Vilkhivtsi	39	(1)

International career^{‡}
2013–2014	Ukraine U17	13	(0)
2015	Ukraine U18	2	(0)
2016	Ukraine U19	3	(0)
2016	Ukraine U20	2	(0)
- * Club domestic league appearances and goals as of 6 June 2026 ‡ National team caps and goals as of 20 July 2024

Volodymyr Serhiyovych Hrachov (Ukrainian: Володимир Сергійович Грачов; born 24 December 1997) is a Ukrainian football defender for Vilkhivtsi.

== Club career ==
In 2014–15 UEFA Youth League, he represented FC Shakhtar Donetsk Under-19 squad that reached the final.

He made his debut in the Russian Football National League for FC Veles Moscow on 9 October 2020 in a game against FC Yenisey Krasnoyarsk.
