= Ruslan Yefanov =

Ukrainian footballer

Personal information
- Full name: Ruslan Serhiyovych Yefanov
- Date of birth: 5 May 1996 (age 30)
- Place of birth: Makiivka, Ukraine
- Height: 1.86 m (6 ft 1 in)
- Position: Goalkeeper

Team information
- Current team: VfB Fortuna Biesdorf
- Number: 1

Youth career
- 2008–2012: Shakhtar Donetsk

Senior career*
Years	Team	Apps	(Gls)
2012–2018	Shakhtar Donetsk	0	(0)
2014	Shakhtar-3 Donetsk	6	(0)
2020–2022	Alians Lypova Dolyna	19	(0)
2022	Cosmos Nowotaniec	0	(0)
2023	Wieża Postomino	16	(0)
2024–	VfB Fortuna Biesdorf	28	(0)
- * Club domestic league appearances and goals as of 00:01, 27 June 2025 (UTC)

Ruslan Serhiyovych Yefanov (Ukrainian: Руслан Сергійович Єфанов; born 5 May 1996) is a Ukrainian professional footballer who plays as a goalkeeper for German club VfB Fortuna Biesdorf.
