= Yuriy Mate =

Ukrainian footballer

Personal information
- Full name: Yuriy Illich Mate
- Date of birth: 7 January 1999 (age 27)
- Place of birth: Donetsk, Ukraine
- Height: 1.81 m (5 ft 11 in)
- Position: Centre-back

Team information
- Current team: Muras United

Youth career
- 2012–2016: Shakhtar Donetsk

Senior career*
Years	Team	Apps	(Gls)
2016–2020	Shakhtar Donetsk	0	(0)
2019–2020	→ Obolon-Brovar Kyiv (loan)	7	(0)
2019–2020	→ Obolon-2 Bucha (loan)	11	(0)
2020–2022	Obolon Kyiv	41	(1)
2020–2021	→ Obolon-2 Bucha	4	(1)
2022–2024	Liepāja	44	(3)
2024–	Muras United	61	(4)
- * Club domestic league appearances and goals

Yuriy Illich Mate (Ukrainian: Юрій Ілліч Мате; born 7 January 1999, Donetsk) is a Ukrainian professional footballer who plays as a centre-back for Latvian club Liepāja.
