= 2022–23 FC Shakhtar Donetsk season =

Shakhtar Donetsk
2022–23 season
- Chairman: Rinat Akhmetov
- Manager: Igor Jovićević
- Stadium: NSC Olimpiyskiy
- Premier League: 1st
- Ukrainian Cup: Cancelled
- Ukrainian Super Cup: Cancelled
- UEFA Champions League: Group stage
- UEFA Europa League: Round of 16 vs Feyenoord
- Top goalscorer: League: Two Players (9); All: Two Players (10)
Home colours	Away colours	Third colours

The 2022–23 season was FC Shakhtar Donetsk's 32nd season in existence and the club's 24th consecutive season in the top flight of Ukrainian football. In addition to the domestic league, Shakhtar Donetsk participated in the UEFA Champions League. The season covered the period from 1 July 2022 to 30 June 2023.

== Season events ==
Due to the ongoing situation resulting from the Russian invasion of Ukraine, Roberto De Zerbi left his role as Head Coach of Shakhtar in July. On 14 July 2022, Igor Jovićević was announced as the club’s new head coach.

On 20 July, Shakhtar announced the signing of Neven Đurasek to a two-year contract from Dinamo Zagreb. The following day, Andriy Totovytskyi returned to Shakhtar on a three-year contract from Kolos Kovalivka.

At the end of July, the Ukrainian Association of Football announced that all clubs would relocate to western areas of Ukraine. for the upcoming season, with Shakhtar continuining to use the NSC Olimpiyskiy.

On 5 August, Shakhtar announced the return of Oleksandr Zubkov to the club on a five-year contract from Ferencváros.

On 22 August, Shakhtar announced the season-long loan signing of Lucas Taylor from PAOK, and the signing of Ivan Petryak to a four-year contract from Fehérvár.

On 1 September, Shakhtar announced the signing of Marian Shved to a five-year contract, from KV Mechelen.

On 23 September, Shakhtar announced the signing of Yehor Nazaryna to a five-year contract, from Zorya Luhansk.

On 29 November, Shakhtar announced the signing of Giorgi Gocholeishvili to a five-year contract, effective from 1 January, from Saburtalo Tbilisi.

On 15 January, Shakhtar announced that Mykhailo Mudryk had left the club to sign for Chelsea with Shakhtar receiving €70 million upfront and potentially another €30 million based on bonuses. The next day, 16 January, Shakhtar announced the return of Yaroslav Rakitskyi to the club on a contract until the end of the season.

On 31 January, Shakhtar announced the signing of Kevin Kelsy from Boston River on a contract until December 2027, whilst Serhiy Kryvtsov left the club to join Inter Miami.

On 10 February, Shakhtar announced the signing of Dmytro Riznyk from Vorskla Poltava to a five-year contract.

On 1 March, Shakhtar announced the signing of Khusrav Toirov from Atyrau on a five-year contract.

On 12 March, Shakhtar terminated their sponsorship deal with Parimatch after the sports betting company was sanctioned by National Security and Defense Council of Ukraine.

On 21 March, Shakhtar announced that they'd signed a new contract with Mykola Matviyenko, until 31 December 2027.

On 24 April, Shakhtar announced that they'd signed Denil Castillo to a five-year contract from Liga de Quito, commencing 1 July 2023.

On 23 June, Yaroslav Rakitskyi extended his contract with the club until 30 June 2024.

== Squad ==
As of match played 4 June 2023

Number	Player	Nationality	Position	Date of birth (age)	Signed from	Signed in	Contract ends	Apps.	Goals
Goalkeepers
1	Oleksiy Shevchenko	(Ukraine)	GK	24 February 1992 (aged 31)	Karpaty Lviv	2018		9	0
12	Tymur Puzankov	(Ukraine)	GK	4 March 2003 (aged 20)	Academy	2021		0	0
30	Andriy Pyatov	(Ukraine)	GK	28 June 1984 (aged 38)	Vorskla Poltava	2007	2023	482	0
31	Dmytro Riznyk	(Ukraine)	GK	30 January 1999 (aged 24)	Vorskla Poltava	2023	2028	0	0
81	Anatoliy Trubin	(Ukraine)	GK	1 August 2001 (aged 21)	Academy	2019		93	0
Defenders
5	Valeriy Bondar	(Ukraine)	DF	27 February 1999 (aged 24)	Academy	2019		73	2
13	Giorgi Gocholeishvili	(Georgia (country))	DF	14 February 2001 (aged 22)	Saburtalo Tbilisi	2023	2027	13	1
15	Bohdan Mykhaylichenko	(Ukraine)	DF	21 March 1997 (aged 26)	on loan from Anderlecht	2022	2023	31	2
22	Mykola Matviyenko	(Ukraine)	DF	2 May 1996 (aged 27)	Academy	2015	2027	67	8
23	Lucas Taylor	(Brazil)	DF	10 April 1995 (aged 28)	on loan from PAOK	2022	2023	15	1
26	Yukhym Konoplya	(Ukraine)	DF	26 August 1999 (aged 23)	Academy	2017		37	3
28	Marian Faryna	(Ukraine)	DF	28 August 2003 (aged 19)	Academy	2022		1	0
32	Eduard Kozik	(Ukraine)	DF	19 April 2003 (aged 20)	Academy	2021		3	0
44	Yaroslav Rakitskyi	(Ukraine)	DF	3 August 1989 (aged 33)	Unattached	2023	2024	340	16
99	Viktor Korniyenko	(Ukraine)	DF	14 February 1999 (aged 24)	Academy	2016		30	1
Midfielders
6	Taras Stepanenko	(Ukraine)	MF	8 August 1989 (aged 33)	Metalurh Zaporizhya	2010		392	29
7	Andriy Totovytskyi	(Ukraine)	MF	20 January 1993 (aged 30)	Kolos Kovalivka	2022	2025	19	1
8	Heorhiy Sudakov	(Ukraine)	MF	1 September 2002 (aged 20)	Academy	2020	2026	65	9
9	Marian Shved	(Ukraine)	MF	16 July 1997 (aged 25)	KV Mechelen	2022	2027	14	4
11	Oleksandr Zubkov	(Ukraine)	MF	3 August 1996 (aged 26)	Ferencváros	2022	2027	49	7
16	Dmytro Kryskiv	(Ukraine)	MF	6 October 2000 (aged 22)	Academy	2019		21	5
17	Neven Đurasek	(Croatia)	MF	15 August 1998 (aged 24)	Dinamo Zagreb	2022	2024	26	1
20	Dmytro Topalov	(Ukraine)	MF	12 March 1998 (aged 25)	Academy	2017		13	0
21	Artem Bondarenko	(Ukraine)	MF	21 August 2000 (aged 22)	Academy	2020		51	10
27	Oleh Ocheretko	(Ukraine)	MF	25 March 2003 (aged 20)	Academy	2020		13	0
29	Yehor Nazaryna	(Ukraine)	MF	10 July 1997 (aged 25)	Zorya Luhansk	2022	2027	22	0
34	Ivan Petryak	(Ukraine)	MF	13 March 1994 (aged 29)	Fehérvár	2022	2026	38	3
60	Anton Hlushchenko	(Ukraine)	MF	20 April 2004 (aged 19)	Academy	2022		1	0
77	Khusrav Toirov	(Tajikistan)	MF	1 August 2004 (aged 18)	Atyrau	2023	2027	2	0
90	Oleksiy Kashchuk	(Ukraine)	MF	29 June 2000 (aged 22)	Vorskla Poltava	2016		0	0
Forwards
2	Lassina Traoré	(Burkina Faso)	FW	12 January 2001 (aged 22)	Ajax	2021	2026	45	15
14	Danylo Sikan	(Ukraine)	FW	16 April 2001 (aged 22)	Karpaty Lviv	2019		54	11
18	Kevin Kelsy	(Venezuela)	FW	27 July 2004 (aged 18)	Boston River	2023	2027	17	6
19	Andriy Kulakov	(Ukraine)	FW	28 April 1999 (aged 24)	Metalist Kharkiv	2016		0	0
45	Andriy Boryachuk	(Ukraine)	FW	23 April 1996 (aged 27)	Academy	2015		19	6
Other players under contract
	Daniel Ehbudzhuo	(Ukraine)	DF	4 January 2002 (aged 21)	Academy	2019			
	Olarenwaju Kayode	(Nigeria)	FW	8 May 1993 (aged 30)	Manchester City	2018	2023	24	4
Contracts suspended
Away on loan
	Marlon	(Brazil)	DF	7 September 1995 (aged 27)	Sassuolo	2021	2026	22	0
	Vinicius Tobias	(Brazil)	DF	23 February 2004 (aged 19)	Internacional	2022		0	0
	Vitão	(Brazil)	DF	2 February 2000 (aged 23)	Palmeiras	2019	2024	36	0
	Valeriy Bondarenko	(Ukraine)	DF	3 February 1994 (aged 29)	Oleksandriya	2019		1	0
	Oleksandr Drambayev	(Ukraine)	DF	21 April 2001 (aged 22)	Academy	2020		0	0
	Marquinhos Cipriano	(Brazil)	MF	27 March 1999 (aged 24)	São Paulo	2018		25	1
	Maycon	(Brazil)	MF	15 July 1997 (aged 25)	Corinthians	2018	2025	98	8
	Pedrinho	(Brazil)	MF	13 April 1998 (aged 25)	Benfica	2021	2026	19	4
	Tetê	(Brazil)	MF	15 February 2000 (aged 23)	Grêmio	2019		107	31
	Manor Solomon	(Israel)	MF	24 July 1999 (aged 23)	Maccabi Petah Tikva	2019		106	22
	Maksym Chekh	(Ukraine)	MF	3 January 1999 (aged 24)	Academy	2018			
	Klim Prykhodko	(Ukraine)	MF	9 February 2000 (aged 23)	Academy	2018			
	Denys Shostak	(Ukraine)	MF	24 January 2003 (aged 20)	Academy	2021			
	Danylo Honcharuk	(Ukraine)	FW	13 July 2002 (aged 20)	Academy	2019			
	Denys Svityukha	(Ukraine)	FW	8 February 2002 (aged 21)	Academy	2019			
	Bohdan Vyunnyk	(Ukraine)	FW	21 May 2002 (aged 21)	Academy	2020		6	0
Players who left during the season
4	Serhiy Kryvtsov	(Ukraine)	DF	15 March 1991 (aged 32)	Metalurh Zaporizhya	2010		223	13
10	Mykhailo Mudryk	(Ukraine)	MF	5 January 2001 (aged 22)	Academy	2019	2026	42	11
	Artem Kholod	(Ukraine)	MF	22 January 2000 (aged 23)	Academy	2019		0	0
	Vladyslav Vakula	(Ukraine)	MF	29 April 1999 (aged 24)	Mariupol	2019	2024	4	0
	Edvard Kobak	(Ukraine)	FW	22 April 2002 (aged 21)	Dnipro	2018		0	0

=== Contract suspensions ===
Note: Flags indicate national team as defined under FIFA eligibility rules; some limited exceptions apply. Players may hold more than one non-FIFA nationality.

No.	Pos.	Nation	Player
—	MF	BRA	Tetê (at Leicester City until 30 June 2023)
—	MF	ISR	Manor Solomon (at Fulham until 30 June 2023)

=== On loan ===
Note: Flags indicate national team as defined under FIFA eligibility rules; some limited exceptions apply. Players may hold more than one non-FIFA nationality.

No.	Pos.	Nation	Player
—	DF	UKR	Valeriy Bondarenko (at Oleksandriya until 30 June 2023)
—	DF	UKR	Oleksandr Drambayev (at Zulte Waregem until 30 June 2023)
—	DF	UKR	Dmytro Kapinus (at Metalist 1925 Kharkiv until 30 June 2023)
—	DF	BRA	Marlon (at Monza until 30 June 2023)
—	DF	BRA	Marquinhos Cipriano (at Cruzeiro until 30 June 2023)
—	DF	BRA	Vinicius Tobias (at Real Madrid until 30 June 2023)
—	DF	BRA	Vitão (at Internacional until 30 June 2023)
—	MF	UKR	Maksym Chekh (at Sabail until 30 June 2023)

No.	Pos.	Nation	Player
—	MF	BRA	Maycon (at Corinthians until 31 December 2022)
—	MF	BRA	Pedrinho (at Atlético Mineiro until 30 June 2023)
—	MF	UKR	Klim Prykhodko (at Kryvbas Kryvyi Rih until 30 June 2023)
—	MF	UKR	Denys Shostak (at Estoril until 30 June 2023)
—	FW	UKR	Danylo Honcharuk (at Lleida Esportiu until 30 June 2023)
—	FW	UKR	Denys Svityukha (at Lleida Esportiu until 30 June 2023)
—	FW	UKR	Bohdan Vyunnyk (at Zürich until 30 June 2023)

== Transfers ==
=== In ===
Date	Position	Nationality	Name	From	Fee	Ref.
20 July 2022	MF	(Croatia)	Neven Đurasek	Dinamo Zagreb	Undisclosed	
21 July 2022	MF	(Ukraine)	Andriy Totovytskyi	Kolos Kovalivka	Undisclosed	
5 August 2022	MF	(Ukraine)	Oleksandr Zubkov	Ferencváros	Undisclosed	
22 August 2022	MF	(Ukraine)	Ivan Petryak	Fehérvár	Undisclosed	
1 September 2022	MF	(Ukraine)	Marian Shved	KV Mechelen	Undisclosed	
23 September 2022	MF	(Ukraine)	Yehor Nazaryna	Zorya Luhansk	Undisclosed	
29 November 2022	DF	(Georgia (country))	Giorgi Gocholeishvili	Saburtalo Tbilisi	Undisclosed	
16 January 2023	DF	(Ukraine)	Yaroslav Rakitskyi	Unattached	Free	
31 January 2023	FW	(Venezuela)	Kevin Kelsy	Boston River	Undisclosed	
10 February 2023	GK	(Ukraine)	Dmytro Riznyk	Vorskla Poltava	Undisclosed	
1 March 2023	MF	(Tajikistan)	Khusrav Toirov	Atyrau	Undisclosed	

=== Loans in ===
Date from	Position	Nationality	Name	From	Date to	Ref.
22 August 2022	DF	(Brazil)	Lucas Taylor	PAOK	End of season	

=== Out ===
Date	Position	Nationality	Name	To	Fee	Ref.
20 June 2022	MF	(Brazil)	Marcos Antônio	Lazio	Undisclosed	
20 June 2022	MF	(Brazil)	David Neres	Benfica	Undisclosed	
1 July 2022	MF	(Brazil)	Fernando	Red Bull Salzburg	Undisclosed	
1 July 2022	MF	(Ukraine)	Serhiy Bolbat	Kolos Kovalivka	Undisclosed	
1 July 2022	MF	(Ukraine)	Danylo Ihnatenko	Girondins de Bordeaux	Undisclosed	
14 July 2022	GK	(Ukraine)	Heorhiy Yermakov	Oleksandriya	Undisclosed	
22 July 2022	DF	(Brazil)	Dodô	Fiorentina	Undisclosed	
4 August 2022	DF	(Brazil)	Ismaily	Lille	Undisclosed	
8 August 2022	MF	(Ukraine)	Artem Kholod	El Paso Locomotive	Undisclosed	
1 September 2022	FW	(Ukraine)	Vladyslav Vakula	Polissya Zhytomyr	Undisclosed	
23 September 2022	DF	(Ukraine)	Ihor Kyryukhantsev	Zorya Luhansk	Undisclosed	
29 September 2022	DF	(Ukraine)	Mykyta Turbayevskyi	Zorya Luhansk	Undisclosed	
7 January 2023	MF	(Ukraine)	Klim Prykhodko	Kryvbas Kryvyi Rih	Undisclosed	
15 January 2023	MF	(Ukraine)	Mykhailo Mudryk	Chelsea	€70,000,000	
31 January 2023	DF	(Ukraine)	Serhiy Kryvtsov	Inter Miami	Undisclosed	
23 February 2023	MF	(Ukraine)	Edvard Kobak	Karpaty Krosno	Undisclosed	
3 April 2023	MF	(Brazil)	Marquinhos Cipriano	Avaí	Undisclosed	

=== Loans out ===
Date from	Position	Nationality	Name	To	Date to	Ref.
31 March 2022	MF	(Brazil)	Maycon	Corinthians	31 December 2022	
1 April 2022	DF	(Brazil)	Vinicius Tobias	Real Madrid B	End of the 2022/23 season	
5 April 2022	FW	(Ukraine)	Danylo Honcharuk	Lleida Esportiu	End of season	
5 April 2022	FW	(Ukraine)	Denys Svityukha	Lleida Esportiu	End of season	
16 June 2022	DF	(Ukraine)	Oleksandr Drambayev	Zulte Waregem	End of season	
30 June 2022	MF	(Brazil)	Pedrinho	Atlético Mineiro	End of season	
12 July 2022	DF	(Brazil)	Marquinhos Cipriano	Cruzeiro	End of season	
5 August 2022	DF	(Brazil)	Marlon	Monza	End of season	
12 August 2022	MF	(Ukraine)	Maksym Chekh	Sabail	End of season	

=== Contract suspensions ===
Date	Position	Nationality	Name	Joined	Date	Ref.
1 July 2022	MF	(Brazil)	Tetê	Lyon	29 January 2023	
25 July 2022	MF	(Israel)	Manor Solomon	Fulham	End of season	
29 January 2023	MF	(Brazil)	Tetê	Leicester City	30 June 2023	

=== Released ===
Date	Position	Nationality	Name	Joined	Date	Ref.
30 June 2023	GK	(Ukraine)	Oleksiy Shevchenko	Chornomorets Odesa		
30 June 2023	MF	(Brazil)	Tetê	Galatasaray	10 August 2023	
30 June 2023	MF	(Israel)	Manor Solomon	Tottenham Hotspur	11 July 2023	
30 June 2023	MF	(Ukraine)	Denys Shostak	Oleksandriya		
30 June 2023	FW	(Nigeria)	Olarenwaju Kayode	Gençlerbirliği		
30 June 2023	FW	(Ukraine)	Andriy Kulakov	Oleksandriya		
30 June 2023	MF	(Ukraine)	Denys Svityukha	Veres Rivne		

== Friendlies ==
22 July 2022 Global Tour for Peace	Fortuna Sittard (Netherlands)	3–3	(Ukraine) Shakhtar Donetsk	Sittard, Netherlands
EEST (UTC+3)	Noslin 11', 69'; Seuntjens 14'		Sikan 35'; Stepanenko 45'; Ocheretko 65'	Stadium: Fortuna Sittard Stadion

26 July 2022 Global Tour for Peace	AFC Ajax (Netherlands)	3–1	(Ukraine) Shakhtar Donetsk	Amsterdam, Netherlands
EEST (UTC+3)	Tadić 45'; Berghuis 73'; Kudus 85'		Mudryk 33'	Stadium: Johan Cruyff Arena

30 July 2022 Global Tour for Peace	FC Utrecht (Netherlands)	2–2	(Ukraine) Shakhtar Donetsk	Utrecht, Netherlands
17:30 EEST (UTC+3)	Redan 7'; Kryvtsov 65' (o.g.)		Bondarenko 41'; Kryskiv 47'	Stadium: Stadion Galgenwaard

7 August 2022 Global Tour for Peace	A.S. Roma (Italy)	5–0	(Ukraine) Shakhtar Donetsk	Rome, Italy
21:45 EEST (UTC+3)	Pellegrini 19'; Gianluca Mancini 41'; Konoplya 45+1' (o.g.); Zaniolo 59'; Bove 87'			Stadium: Stadio Olimpico

10 August 2022 Global Tour for Peace	Al-Adalah FC (Saudi Arabia)	0–1	(Ukraine) Shakhtar Donetsk	Brdo, Slovenia
12:00 EEST (UTC+3)			Al-Jamaan 42' (o.g.)	Stadium: National Football Center Brdo

10 August 2022 Global Tour for Peace	NK Domžale (Slovenia)	0–3	(Ukraine) Shakhtar Donetsk	Domžale, Slovenia
20:00 EEST (UTC+3)			Mudryk 11', 32'; Topalov 34'	Stadium: Domžale Sports Park

15 August 2022 Global Tour for Peace	Al Fateh (Saudi Arabia)	0–5	(Ukraine) Shakhtar Donetsk	Brdo, Slovenia
12:00 EEST (UTC+3)			Sikan 7', 37'; Vakula 24'; Kryvtsov 34'; Traoré 80'	Stadium: National Football Center Brdo

15 August 2022 Global Tour for Peace	Al Fateh (Saudi Arabia)	3–1	(Ukraine) Shakhtar Donetsk	Brdo, Slovenia
19:00 EEST (UTC+3)	Cueva 38'; Al-Harbi 80'; Valera 80+2'		Mudryk 29'	Stadium: National Football Center Brdo

20 January 2023	Shakhtar Donetsk (Ukraine)	1–2	Austria Wien	Belek, Turkey
16:30 EET (UTC+2)	Bondarenko 79' (pen.)	Report	Holland 24'; Ranftl (yellow card) 56'; F.Kopp 72'

27 January 2023	Shakhtar Donetsk (Ukraine)	2–2	(Slovenia) Koper	Belek, Turkey
16:30 EET (UTC+2)	Petryak 14'; Nazaryna 90+1'	Report	Ochieng 13'; Osuji (penalty missed) 55'; Edomwonyi 64'

31 January 2023	Shakhtar Donetsk (Ukraine)	2–2	(Bulgaria) Ludogorets Razgrad	Belek, Turkey
16:30 EET (UTC+2)	Traoré 72'; Bondarenko 90+6' (pen.)	Report	Thiago 27'; Nonato 29'; Despodov (yellow card) 34'; Piotrowski (yellow card) 90+5'

1 February 2023	Shakhtar Donetsk (Ukraine)	4–4	(Slovenia) NK Maribor	Belek, Turkey
16:30 EET (UTC+2)	Bondar (yellow card) 10'; Sudakov 15'; Gocholeishvili (yellow card) 27'; Kryskiv 34', 41'; Mykhaylichenko (yellow card) 55'; Bondarenko 71'; Yushchenko (yellow card) 88'; Glushchenko (yellow card) 90'	Report	Brnić 39', 51'; Božić 48', 77'; Milec (yellow card) 53'; Vipotnik (yellow card) 61'

8 February 2023	Shakhtar Donetsk (Ukraine)	4–0	(Bosnia and Herzegovina) Sarajevo	Belek, Turkey
16:30 EET (UTC+2)	Stepanenko 28'; Traoré 33', 55'; Sudakov 36'	Report

== Competitions ==
=== Overall record ===
Competition	First match	Last match	Starting round	Final position	Record							
Competition	First match	Last match	Starting round	Final position	Pld	W	D	L	GF	GA	GD	Win %
Premier League	23 August 2022	4 June 2023	Matchday 1	Winners	30	22	6	2	69	21	+48	73.33
Champions League	6 September 2022	2 November 2022	Group Stage	Group Stage	6	1	3	2	8	10	−2	16.67
Europa League	16 February 2023	16 March 2023	Knockout round play-offs	Last 16	4	1	1	2	5	11	−6	25.00
Total					40	24	10	6	82	42	+40	60.00

Last updated: 4 June 2023
Source: Results

=== Premier League ===
==== League table ====
Pos	Team	Pld	W	D	L	GF	GA	GD	Pts	Qualification or relegation
1	Shakhtar Donetsk (C)	30	22	6	2	69	21	+48	72	Qualification for the Champions League group stage
2	Dnipro-1	30	21	4	5	61	27	+34	67	Qualification for the Champions League second qualifying round
3	Zorya Luhansk	30	20	4	6	61	34	+27	64	Qualification for the Europa League play-off round
4	Dynamo Kyiv	30	18	6	6	51	25	+26	60	Qualification for the Europa Conference League third qualifying round
5	Vorskla Poltava	30	13	6	11	38	37	+1	45	Qualification for the Europa Conference League second qualifying round

Source: upl.ua
Rules for classification: 1) Points; 2) Head-to-head points; 3) Head-to-head goal difference; 4) Head-to-head goals scored; 5) Goal difference; 6) Goals scored; 7) Draw or "Golden match" if two teams tied for title (Article 22, paragraph 3).
(C) Champions

Teams that placed 13th and 14th in the 2022–23 Ukrainian Premier League play two-leg play-off with the third and fourth teams of the 2022–23 Ukrainian First League. The draw for play-offs took place on 2 June 2023 and the games will be played on 10 and 14 June 2023. If players of the clubs would be called to the national teams, games will be moved to June 8 and 12.

Team 1	Agg.	Team 2	1st leg	2nd leg
Inhulets Petrove	2–3	LNZ Cherkasy	1–1	1–2
Metalurh Zaporizhzhia	2–6	Veres Rivne	1–0	1–6

=== First leg ===
10 June 2023
17:40 UTC+3 (Note: Kick off time was delayed for 40 minutes due to air alert.)

Inhulets Petrove	1 – 1	LNZ Cherkasy
Klymenko 46'	Report	Tyshchenko 57' (pen.)

Inhulets Stadium, Petrove
Attendance: 0
Referee: Vitaliy Romanov (Dnipro)

10 June 2023
17:00 UTC+3

Metalurh Zaporizhzhia	1 – 0	Veres Rivne
Sad 29'	Report	Vovchenko (red card) 5'

Ukraina Stadium, Lviv
Attendance: 0
Referee: Yuriy Ivanov (Donetsk Oblast)

=== Second leg ===
14 June 2023
15:00 UTC+3

LNZ Cherkasy	2 – 1	Inhulets Petrove
Savin 17'; Korobenko 30' (o.g.); Tyshchenko (red card) 90+1'	Report	Sitalo 51'

Cherkasy Arena, Cherkasy
Attendance: 0
Referee: Maksym Kozyryatskyi (Zaporizhia)

LNZ Cherkasy won 3–2 on aggregate and were promoted to the UPL; Inhulets were relegated to the First League

14 June 2023
13:00 UTC+3

Veres Rivne	6 – 1	Metalurh Zaporizhzhia
Krapyvnyi 16' (o.g.); Balan 23, 66'; Hahun 29'; Pasich 82'; Hayduchyk 89'	Report	Sokol (red card) 37'; Mohylnyi 90+1'

Avanhard Stadium, Rivne
Attendance: 0
Referee: Dmytro Bondarenko (Odesa)

Veres Rivne won 6–2 on aggregrate and both teams remained in their respective divisions

==== Results summary ====
Overall								Home						Away					
Pld	W	D	L	GF	GA	GD	Pts	W	D	L	GF	GA	GD	W	D	L	GF	GA	GD
30	22	6	2	69	21	+48	72	12	3	0	30	9	+21	10	3	2	39	12	+27

Last updated: 4 June 2023.
Source: Results

==== Results by round ====
Round	1	2	3	4	5	6	7	8	9	10	11	12	13	14	15	16	17	18	19	20	21	22	23	24	25	26	27	28	29	30
Ground	H	H	A	H	A	H (Note: matchday 7)	H (Note: matchday 8)	H (Note: matchday 10)	H (Note: matchday 11)	A (Note: matchday 12)	H (Note: matchday 13)	A (Note: matchday 14)	H (Note: matchday 15)	A (Note: matchday 9)	A (Note: matchday 16)	A (Note: matchday 17)	H (Note: matchday 18)	A (Note: matchday 19)	H (Note: matchday 20)	A (Note: matchday 6)	H	A	A	H	A	A	H	A	H	A
Result	D	W	W	W	W	W	W	D	W	W	D	L	W	W	W	W	W	D	W	W	W	D	W	W	D	W	W	W	W	L
Position	7	6	4	2	1	2	2	2	2	2	2	2	2	2	1	1	1	1	1	1	1	1	1	1	1	1	1	1	1	1

Updated to match(es) played on 4 June 2023. Source: Results
A = Away; H = Home; W = Win; D = Draw; L = Loss

==== Results ====
23 August 2022 1	Shakhtar Donetsk	0–0	Metalist 1925 Kharkiv	Kyiv
13:00 EEST (UTC+3)	Ocheretko (yellow card) 84'	Report	Remenyuk (yellow card) 72'	Stadium: NSC Olimpiyskiy; Attendance: 0 Referee: Oleksandr Shandor
Note: Match played behind closed doors.

28 August 2022 2	Shakhtar Donetsk	1–0	Kryvbas Kryvyi Rih	Kyiv
15:00 EEST (UTC+3)	Bondarenko 77' (yellow card) 79'	Report	Tatarkov (yellow card) 48' (yellow-red card) 74'	Stadium: NSC Olimpiyskiy; Attendance: 0 Referee: Kateryna Monzul
Note: Match played behind closed doors.

2 September 2022 3	Rukh Lviv	0–1	Shakhtar Donetsk	Lviv
17:00 EEST (UTC+3)		Report	Bondarenko (yellow card) 20'; Mudryk (red card) 35'; Konoplya (yellow card) 65' (goal) 79'; Trubin (yellow card) 90+3'	Stadium: Ukraina Stadium; Attendance: 0 Referee: Yevhen Aranovskyi
Note: Match played behind closed doors.

10 September 2022 4	Shakhtar Donetsk	2–1	Chornomorets Odesa	Kyiv
17:00 EEST (UTC+3)	Shved 74'; Traoré (yellow card) 90+3' (goal) 90+6'	Report	Braharu 10'; Selin (yellow card) 26'; Naumets (yellow card) 30'; Hladkyi (yellow card) 61'; Fili (yellow card) 80'; Salyuk (yellow card) 90+1'	Stadium: NSC Olimpiyskiy; Attendance: 0 Referee: Mykola Balakin
Note: Match played behind closed doors.

1 October 2022 5	Metalist Kharkiv	1–6	Shakhtar Donetsk	Lviv
17:00 EEST (UTC+3)	Klymenchuk (yellow card) 11'; Tankovskyi (yellow card) 12'; Chaykovskyi (yellow card) 37'; Porokh (yellow card) 46'; Chidomere 88'	Report	Sikan 18', 30', 38'; Zubkov 35'; Traoré 72'; Mudryk (penalty missed) 81' (yellow card) 89'; Đurasek 90+1'	Stadium: Arena Lviv; Attendance: 0 Referee: Ihor Paskhal
Note: Match played behind closed doors.

16 October 2022 7	Shakhtar Donetsk	3–1	Dynamo Kyiv	Lviv
17:00 EEST (UTC+3)	Mykhaylichenko (yellow card) 10'; Zubkov 29'; Traoré (penalty missed) 45'; Mudryk 47'; Konoplya (yellow card) 56'; Sikan (yellow card) 63' (goal) 74'; Stepanenko (yellow card) 71'; Petryak (yellow card) 88'	Report	Vivcharenko (yellow card) 6'; Vanat (yellow card) 14' (goal) 46'; Zabarnyi (red card) 69'	Stadium: Arena Lviv; Attendance: 0 Referee: Kateryna Monzul
Note: Match played behind closed doors.

19 October 2022 8	Shakhtar Donetsk	3–0	Kolos Kovalivka	Kyiv
17:00 EEST (UTC+3)	Mudryk 8', 56'; Taylor 47'	Report	Bezborodko (yellow card) 40'	Stadium: NSC Olimpiyskiy; Attendance: 0 Referee: Andrii Kovalenko
Note: Match played behind closed doors.

29 October 2022 10	Shakhtar Donetsk	2–2	Oleksandriya	Lviv
17:00 EEST (UTC+3)	Taylor (yellow card) 9' (yellow-red card) 56'; Mykhaylichenko 42'; Mudryk 82'	Report	Tsurikov 5'; Dryshlyuk (yellow card) 33'; Demchenko (yellow card) 35' (goal) 86'; Babohlo (yellow card) 49'; Kozhushko (yellow card) 87'	Stadium: Arena Lviv; Attendance: 0 Referee: Vitalii Romanov
Note: Match played behind closed doors.

5 November 2022 11	Shakhtar Donetsk	3–0	Inhulets Petrove	Lviv
15:00 EET (UTC+2)	Kryskiv 18'; Bondar (yellow card) 27'; Sikan 69' (pen.), 90+3'	Report	Chenbay (yellow card) 30'; Sakiv (yellow card) 39'	Stadium: Arena Lviv; Attendance: 0 Referee: Oleksandr Shandor
Note: Match played behind closed doors.

9 November 2022 12	Veres Rivne	0–2	Shakhtar Donetsk	Lviv
15:00 EET (UTC+2)	Klyots (yellow card) 71'	Report	Stepanenko (yellow card) 11'; Mudryk 30' (pen.); Kryskiv 65'	Stadium: Arena Lviv; Attendance: 0 Referee: Anatoliy Abdula
Note: Match played behind closed doors.

13 November 2022 13	Shakhtar Donetsk	2–2	Zorya Luhansk	Lviv
15:00 EET (UTC+2)	Bondarenko 13'; Traoré (yellow card) 45'; Mudryk (yellow card) 62'; Bondar 63'	Report	Kyryukhantsev (yellow card) 45'; Buletsa 46'; Antyukh (yellow card) 90+4'	Stadium: Arena Lviv; Attendance: 0 Referee: Kateryna Monzul
Note: Match played behind closed doors.

19 November 2022 14	Dnipro-1	2–1	Shakhtar Donetsk	Uzhhorod
13:00 EET (UTC+2)	Pikhalyonok 21'; Sarapiy (yellow card) 29'; Dovbyk 53' (yellow card) 89'	Report	Mudryk 17' (yellow card) 85'; Bondar (yellow card) 83'	Stadium: Avanhard Stadium; Referee: Viktor Kopievskii

23 November 2022 15	Shakhtar Donetsk	3–2	Vorskla Poltava	Lviv
14:00 EET (UTC+2)	Sudakov (yellow card) 13' (goal) 27'; Traoré (yellow card) 35' (penalty missed) 64'; Kryskiv 47'; Mudryk 86'	Report	(yellow card) 18'; Chelyadin (yellow card) 52' (goal) 75'; Seferi 62'; Perduta (yellow card) 72'; Riznyk (yellow card) 86'; Kravets (yellow card) 89'	Stadium: Arena Lviv; Attendance: 0 Referee: Mykola Balakin
Note: Match delayed due to an air-raid siren as a result of the Russian invasion of Ukraine.

28 February 2023 9	Mynai	1–4	Shakhtar Donetsk	Lviv
15:00 EEST (UTC+3)	Vorobchak 31'; Ghecev (yellow card) 90+3'	Report	Stepanenko 8'; Sikan 15', 60'; Sudakov 40' (pen.)	Stadium: Arena Lviv; Referee: Anatoliy Abdula
Note: Match originally scheduled for 22 October 2022.

5 March 2023 16	Metalist 1925 Kharkiv	0–7	Shakhtar Donetsk	Lviv
14:00 EET (UTC+2)		Report	Zubkov 5', 41'; Mykhaylichenko 13'; Traoré (yellow card) 14' (goal) 38'; Kurylo 56' (o.g.); Petryak 58'; Rakitskyi 66'	Stadium: Arena Lviv; Referee: Oleksandr Shandor

12 March 2023 17	Kryvbas Kryvyi Rih	0–3	Shakhtar Donetsk	Kryvyi Rih
14:00 EET (UTC+2)	Vernydub (yellow card) 12'; Kapić (yellow card) 64'	Report	Sudakov 58'; Kelsy 80'; Shved 83'	Stadium: Shakhta Zhovtneva Stadium; Referee: Kateryna Monzul

19 March 2023 18	Shakhtar Donetsk	2–0	Rukh Lviv	Lviv
15:00 EET (UTC+2)	Matviyenko 27'; Kryskiv 32'; Kelsy (yellow card) 35'; Rakitskyi (yellow card) 68'	Report	Edson (yellow card) 13'	Stadium: Arena Lviv; Referee: Mykola Balakin

2 April 2023 19	Chornomorets Odesa	2–2	Shakhtar Donetsk	Odesa
15:00 EEST (UTC+3)	Putrya 8' (yellow card) 58'; Salyuk 41'; Hadida (yellow card) 45'; Vasylyev (yellow card) 73'; Yusov (yellow card) 90'	Report	Kryskiv 1'; Gocholeishvili 19'; Bondar (yellow card) 43'; Nazaryna (yellow card) 55'	Stadium: Chornomorets Stadium; Referee: Andrii Kovalenko

8 April 2023 20	Shakhtar Donetsk	1–0	Metalist Kharkiv	Uzhhorod
14:00 EEST (UTC+3)	Stepanenko (yellow card) 29'; Bondar (yellow card) 55'; Bondarenko 64'; Traoré (yellow card) 90+3'	Report	Ralyuchenko (yellow card) 33'	Stadium: Avanhard Stadium; Referee: Oleksandr Shandor

12 April 2022 6	Lviv	1–2	Shakhtar Donetsk	Lviv
14:00 EEST (UTC+3)	Gocholeishvili 56' (o.g.)	Report	Sudakov 61'; Stepanenko (yellow card) 63'; Matviyenko (yellow card) 66'; Kelsy 90+4'	Stadium: Arena Lviv; Referee: Anatoliy Abdula
Note: Match originally scheduled for 8 October 2022.

16 April 2023 21	Shakhtar Donetsk	2–0	Lviv	Lviv
14:00 EEST (UTC+3)	Bondarenko 7', 75'; Sikan (yellow card) 65'; Totovytskyi (yellow card) 84'	Report	Kuzyk (yellow card) 17'; Buhay (yellow card) 44'; Hrysyo (yellow card) 45+1'; Byelyayev (yellow card) 58'; Alibekov (yellow card) 84'	Stadium: Arena Lviv; Referee: Oleksii Derevinskyi

22 April 2023 22	Dynamo Kyiv	1–1	Shakhtar Donetsk	Kyiv
17:00 EEST (UTC+3)	Andriyevskyi 82'; Benito (yellow card) 89'	Report	Stepanenko 12'; Đurasek (yellow card) 27'; Rakitskyi (yellow card) 38'; Bondarenko (yellow card) 55'; Nazaryna (yellow card) 86'; Mykhaylichenko (yellow card) 87'	Stadium: Valeriy Lobanovskyi Dynamo Stadium; Referee: Vitalii Romanov

28 April 2023 23	Kolos Kovalivka	1–3	Shakhtar Donetsk	Kovalivka
15:00 EEST (UTC+3)	Orikhovskyi 13'; Volynets (yellow card) 52'; Bohdanov (yellow card) 64'	Report	Bondarenko 47' (pen.); Traoré 52'; Mykhaylichenko (yellow card) 73'; Kelsy 80'	Stadium: Kolos Stadium; Referee: Oleksii Derevinskyi

3 May 2023 24	Shakhtar Donetsk	3–0	Mynai	Mynai
13:00 EEST (UTC+3)	Traoré 12'; Konoplya (yellow card) 55'; Kelsy (yellow card) 72'	Report	Bandura (yellow card) 64'; Vyshnevskyi (yellow card) 84'	Stadium: Mynai Arena; Referee: Mykola Balakin

7 May 2023 25	Oleksandriya	1–1	Shakhtar Donetsk	Oleksandriia
15:00 EEST (UTC+3)	Mykhaylenko 9'; Shevchenko (yellow card) 90+1'	Report	Kelsy (yellow card) 38' (goal) 75'; Rakitskyi (yellow card) 68'	Stadium: CSC Nika Stadium; Referee: Oleksandr Derdo

13 May 2023 26	Inhulets Petrove	0–2	Shakhtar Donetsk	Lviv
17:00 EEST (UTC+3)	Palamarchuk (red card) 78'	Report	Konoplya 51'; Pavlov 85' (o.g.); Bondarenko (yellow card) 90+4'	Stadium: Arena Lviv; Referee: Ihor Paskhal

19 May 2023 27	Shakhtar Donetsk	2–1	Veres Rivne	Uzhhorod
17:00 EEST (UTC+3)	Zubkov 35'; Gocholeishvili (yellow card) 37'; Sikan (penalty missed) 47'; Matviyenko 83'; Mykhaylichenko (yellow card) 90+3'	Report	Vovchenko (yellow card) 38'; Kurko (yellow card) 47'; Matkobozhyk (yellow card) 60'; V.Sharay 74'	Stadium: Avanhard Stadium; Referee: Oleksii Derevinskyi

24 May 2023 28	Zorya Luhansk	0–3	Shakhtar Donetsk	Kyiv
17:00 EEST (UTC+3)	Shakhov (yellow card) 32'; Snurnitsyn (red card) 49'; Brazhko (yellow card) 53'	Report	Sudakov 5'; Bondarenko 59'; Kelsy 83'	Stadium: Valeriy Lobanovskyi Dynamo Stadium; Referee: Oleksandr Shandor

28 May 2023 29	Shakhtar Donetsk	3–0	Dnipro-1	Lviv
15:00 EEST (UTC+3)	Bondarenko 9'; Sikan 55'; Stepanenko 59'; Shved (yellow card) 90'; Nazaryna (red card) 90+3'; Trubin (red card) 90+3'	Report	Blanco (yellow card) 36'; Hayner (yellow card) 67'; Rubchynskyi (yellow card) 76'; Matarrita (red card) 90+3'; Peglow (red card) 90+3'; Hutsulyak (red card) 90+3'; Fedoriv (red card) 90+3'	Stadium: Arena Lviv; Referee: Kateryna Monzul

4 June 2023 30	Vorskla Poltava	2–1	Shakhtar Donetsk	Poltava
15:00 EEST (UTC+3)	Seferi (yellow card) 22' (goal) 36' (pen.); Pavlyuk 50'; Perduta (red card) 71'; Isenko (yellow card) 90+3'	Report	Bondarenko 80'	Stadium: Oleksiy Butovsky Vorskla Stadium; Referee: Ihor Paskhal

=== UEFA Champions League ===
==== Group stage ====
Pos	Team	Pld	W	D	L	GF	GA	GD	Pts	Qualification
1	(Spain) Real Madrid	6	4	1	1	15	6	+9	13	Advance to knockout phase
2	(Germany) RB Leipzig	6	4	0	2	13	9	+4	12	Advance to knockout phase
3	(Ukraine) Shakhtar Donetsk	6	1	3	2	8	10	−2	6	Transfer to Europa League
4	(Scotland) Celtic	6	0	2	4	4	15	−11	2	

Source: UEFA
Rules for classification: Group stage tiebreakers

6 September 2022 1	RB Leipzig (Germany)	1–4	(Ukraine) Shakhtar Donetsk	Leipzig, Germany
22:00 EEST (UTC+3)	Simakan 57' (yellow card) 61'	Report	Shved 16', 58'; Konoplya (yellow card) 50'; Trubin (yellow card) 60'; Mudryk (yellow card) 61' (goal) 76'; Traoré 85'; Đurasek (yellow card) 90'	Stadium: Red Bull Arena; Attendance: 41,591; Referee: João Pinheiro (Portugal)

14 September 2022 2	Shakhtar Donetsk (Ukraine)	1–1	(Scotland) Celtic	Warsaw, Poland (Note: Due to the Russian invasion of Ukraine, Ukrainian teams are required to play their home matches at neutral venues until further notice. Therefore, Shakhtar Donetsk will play their home matches at Stadion Wojska Polskiego, Warsaw, Poland, instead of their regular stadium Donbas Arena, Donetsk.)
19:45 EEST (UTC+3)	Mudryk 29'	Report	Bondarenko 10' (o.g.); Jenz (yellow card) 52'	Stadium: Stadion Wojska Polskiego; Attendance: 20,697; Referee: Glenn Nyberg (Sweden)

5 October 2022 3	Real Madrid (Spain)	2–1	(Ukraine) Shakhtar Donetsk	Madrid, Spain
22:00 EEST (UTC+3)	Rodrygo 13'; Vinícius 28'	Report	Zubkov 39'; Bondar (yellow card) 55'; Mudryk (yellow card) 90+2'	Stadium: Santiago Bernabéu; Attendance: 56,011; Referee: Ivan Kružliak (Slovakia)

11 October 2022 4	Shakhtar Donetsk (Ukraine)	1–1	(Spain) Real Madrid	Warsaw, Poland
22:00 EEST (UTC+3)	Konoplya (yellow card) 16'; Zubkov 46'; Bondarenko (yellow card) 88'	Report	Militão (yellow card) 85'; Kroos (yellow card) 90'; Rüdiger 90+5'	Stadium: Stadion Wojska Polskiego; Attendance: 29,030; Referee: Orel Grinfeld (Israel)

25 October 2022 5	Celtic (Scotland)	1–1	(Ukraine) Shakhtar Donetsk	Glasgow, Scotland
22:00 EEST (UTC+3)	Giakoumakis 34'	Report	Matviyenko (yellow card) 31'; Bondar (yellow card) 50'; Stepanenko (yellow card) 56'; Mudryk 58'; Zubkov (yellow card) 90'	Stadium: Celtic Park; Attendance: 57,478; Referee: Serdar Gözübüyük (Netherlands)

2 November 2022 6	Shakhtar Donetsk (Ukraine)	0–4	(Germany) RB Leipzig	Warsaw, Poland
19:45 EET (UTC+2)	Mykhaylichenko (yellow card) 24'; Taylor (yellow card) 66'; Sikan (yellow card) 89'	Report	Nkunku 10'; Silva 50'; Szoboszlai 62'; Bondar 68' (o.g.)	Stadium: Stadion Wojska Polskiego; Attendance: 26,045; Referee: Michael Oliver (England)

=== UEFA Europa League ===
==== Knockout phase ====
===== Knockout round play-offs =====
The draw for the knockout round play-offs took place on 7 November 2022, with Shakhtar drawing Rennes.

16 February 2023 First leg	Shakhtar Donetsk (Ukraine)	2–1	(France) Rennes	Warsaw, Poland
19:45 EET (UTC+2)	Kryskiv 11'; Stepanenko (yellow card) 40'; Bondarenko 45+1' (pen.); Mykhaylichenko (yellow card) 84'; Zubkov (yellow card) 85'	Report	Bourigeaud (yellow card) 43'; Ugochukwu (yellow card) 57'; Ekambi 59'; Omari (yellow card) 85'	Stadium: Stadion Wojska Polskiego; Attendance: 13,415; Referee: Irfan Peljto (Bosnia and Herzegovina)

23 February 2023 Second leg	Rennes (France)	2–1 (a.e.t.) (3–3 agg.) (4–5 p)	(Ukraine) Shakhtar Donetsk	Rennes, France
22:00 EET (UTC+2)	Toko Ekambi 52'; Spence (yellow card) 54'; Salah 106'	Report	Bondar (yellow card) 63'; Traoré (yellow card) 68'; Mykhaylichenko (yellow card) 82'; Konoplya (yellow card) 90+4'; Belocian 119' (o.g.); Matviyenko (yellow card) 120+2'	Stadium: Roazhon Park; Attendance: 27,781; Referee: Tobias Stieler (Germany)
	Penalties
	Doué (penalty scored); Doku (penalty missed); Meling (penalty missed); Gouiri (penalty scored); Tait (penalty scored); Omari (penalty scored); Ugochukwu (penalty missed)		(penalty scored) Nazaryna; (penalty scored) Sudakov; (penalty scored) Bondarenko; (penalty missed) Bondar; (penalty missed) Sikan; (penalty scored) Konoplya; (penalty scored) Kelsy

===== Round of 16 =====
The draw for the knockout Round of 16 took place on 24 February.

9 March 2023 First leg	Shakhtar Donetsk (Ukraine)	1–1	(Netherlands) Feyenoord	Warsaw, Poland
22:00 EET (UTC+2)	Rakitskyi 79'	Report	Wieffer (yellow card) 70'; Bullaude 88'	Stadium: Stadion Wojska Polskiego; Attendance: 17,423; Referee: Ivan Kružliak (Slovakia)

16 March 2023 Second leg	Feyenoord (Netherlands)	7–1 (8–2 agg.)	(Ukraine) Shakhtar Donetsk	Rotterdam, Netherlands
19:45 EET (UTC+2)	Giménez 9'; Kökçü 24', 38' (pen.); Idrissi 49', 60'; Jahanbakhsh 64'; Danilo 67'	Report	Bondarenko (yellow card) 20'; Sudakov (yellow card) 81'; Kelsy 87'	Stadium: De Kuip; Attendance: 37,500; Referee: Jesús Gil Manzano (Spain)

== Squad statistics ==
As of match played 4 June 2023

=== Appearances and goals ===
No.	Pos	Nat	Player	Total		Premier League		UEFA Champions League		UEFA Europa League	
No.	Pos	Nat	Player	Apps	Goals	Apps	Goals	Apps	Goals	Apps	Goals
1	GK	(Ukraine) UKR	Oleksiy Shevchenko	1	0	0+1	0	0	0	0	0
2	FW	(Burkina Faso) BFA	Lassina Traoré	31	6	12+9	5	3+3	1	4	0
5	DF	(Ukraine) UKR	Valeriy Bondar	35	1	25+1	1	6	0	3	0
6	MF	(Ukraine) UKR	Taras Stepanenko	36	3	26	3	6	0	4	0
7	MF	(Ukraine) UKR	Andriy Totovytskyi	10	0	2+7	0	0+1	0	0	0
8	MF	(Ukraine) UKR	Heorhiy Sudakov	39	5	27+2	5	6	0	4	0
9	MF	(Ukraine) UKR	Marian Shved	14	4	4+6	2	3	2	0+1	0
11	MF	(Ukraine) UKR	Oleksandr Zubkov	26	7	13+4	5	5	2	4	0
13	DF	(Georgia (country)) GEO	Giorgi Gocholeishvili	13	1	9+4	1	0	0	0	0
14	FW	(Ukraine) UKR	Danylo Sikan	33	9	14+12	9	0+4	0	0+3	0
15	DF	(Ukraine) UKR	Bohdan Mykhaylichenko	32	2	18+7	2	4	0	3	0
16	MF	(Ukraine) UKR	Dmytro Kryskiv	22	6	12+6	5	0+1	0	3	1
17	MF	(Croatia) CRO	Neven Đurasek	26	1	12+6	1	0+5	0	0+3	0
18	FW	(Venezuela) VEN	Kevin Kelsy	17	6	4+10	5	0	0	0+3	1
20	MF	(Ukraine) UKR	Dmytro Topalov	13	0	3+8	0	0	0	2	0
21	MF	(Ukraine) UKR	Artem Bondarenko	38	10	25+3	9	6	0	4	1
22	DF	(Ukraine) UKR	Mykola Matviyenko	38	2	27+1	2	6	0	4	0
23	DF	(Brazil) BRA	Lucas Taylor	16	1	4+6	1	3+2	0	1	0
26	DF	(Ukraine) UKR	Yukhym Konoplya	26	2	15+3	2	5	0	3	0
27	MF	(Ukraine) UKR	Oleh Ocheretko	14	0	3+10	0	0+1	0	0	0
28	DF	(Ukraine) UKR	Marian Faryna	1	0	1	0	0	0	0	0
29	MF	(Ukraine) UKR	Yehor Nazaryna	23	0	7+13	0	0	0	0+3	0
30	GK	(Ukraine) UKR	Andriy Pyatov	2	0	2	0	0	0	0	0
32	DF	(Ukraine) UKR	Eduard Kozik	3	0	0+3	0	0	0	0	0
34	MF	(Ukraine) UKR	Ivan Petryak	22	1	4+9	1	1+5	0	0+3	0
44	DF	(Ukraine) UKR	Yaroslav Rakitskyi	14	2	13	1	0	0	1	1
45	FW	(Ukraine) UKR	Andriy Boryachuk	2	0	0+2	0	0	0	0	0
60	MF	(Ukraine) UKR	Anton Hlushchenko	1	0	0+1	0	0	0	0	0
77	MF	(Tajikistan) TJK	Khusrav Toirov	2	0	0+2	0	0	0	0	0
81	GK	(Ukraine) UKR	Anatoliy Trubin	38	0	28	0	6	0	4	0
99	DF	(Ukraine) UKR	Viktor Korniyenko	1	0	0+1	0	0	0	0	0
Players who suspended their contracts:
Players away on loan:
Players who left Shakhtar Donetsk during the season:
4	DF	(Ukraine) UKR	Serhiy Kryvtsov	11	0	9	0	0+2	0	0	0
10	MF	(Ukraine) UKR	Mykhailo Mudryk	18	10	11+1	7	6	3	0	0

=== Goalscorers ===
Place	Position	Nation	Number	Name	Premier League	Champions League	Europa League	Total
1	MF	(Ukraine)	21	Artem Bondarenko	9	0	1	10
1	MF	(Ukraine)	10	Mykhailo Mudryk	7	3	0	10
3	FW	(Ukraine)	14	Danylo Sikan	9	0	0	9
4	MF	(Ukraine)	11	Oleksandr Zubkov	5	2	0	7
5	FW	(Burkina Faso)	2	Lassina Traoré	5	1	0	6
5	MF	(Ukraine)	16	Dmytro Kryskiv	5	0	1	6
5	FW	(Venezuela)	18	Kevin Kelsy	5	0	1	6
8	MF	(Ukraine)	8	Heorhiy Sudakov	5	0	0	5
9	MF	(Ukraine)	9	Marian Shved	2	2	0	4
10	MF	(Ukraine)	6	Taras Stepanenko	3	0	0	3
10				Own goal	2	0	1	3
12	DF	(Ukraine)	15	Bohdan Mykhaylichenko	2	0	0	2
12	DF	(Ukraine)	26	Yukhym Konoplya	2	0	0	2
12	MF	(Ukraine)	22	Mykola Matviyenko	2	0	0	2
12	DF	(Ukraine)	44	Yaroslav Rakitskyi	1	0	1	2
16	MF	(Croatia)	17	Neven Đurasek	1	0	0	1
16	DF	(Brazil)	23	Lucas Taylor	1	0	0	1
16	DF	(Ukraine)	5	Valeriy Bondar	1	0	0	1
16	MF	(Ukraine)	34	Ivan Petryak	1	0	0	1
16	DF	(Georgia (country))	13	Giorgi Gocholeishvili	1	0	0	1
TOTALS					69	8	5	82

=== Clean sheets ===
Place	Position	Nation	Number	Name	Premier League	Champions League	Europa League	Total
1	GK	(Ukraine)	81	Anatoliy Trubin	14	0	0	14
2	GK	(Ukraine)	30	Andriy Pyatov	1	0	0	1
TOTALS					15	0	0	15

=== Disciplinary record ===
Number	Nation	Position	Name	Premier League		Champions League		Europa League		Total	
Number	Nation	Position	Name	Booked	Sent off (straight red)	Booked	Sent off (straight red)	Booked	Sent off (straight red)	Booked	Sent off (straight red)
2	(Burkina Faso)	FW	Lassina Traoré	5	0	0	0	1	0	6	0
5	(Ukraine)	DF	Valeriy Bondar	4	0	2	0	1	0	7	0
6	(Ukraine)	MF	Taras Stepanenko	4	0	1	0	1	0	6	0
7	(Ukraine)	MF	Andriy Totovytskyi	1	0	0	0	0	0	1	0
8	(Ukraine)	MF	Heorhiy Sudakov	1	0	0	0	1	0	2	0
9	(Ukraine)	MF	Marian Shved	1	0	0	0	0	0	1	0
11	(Ukraine)	MF	Oleksandr Zubkov	0	0	1	0	1	0	2	0
13	(Georgia (country))	DF	Giorgi Gocholeishvili	1	0	0	0	0	0	1	0
14	(Ukraine)	FW	Danylo Sikan	2	0	1	0	0	0	3	0
15	(Ukraine)	DF	Bohdan Mykhaylichenko	4	0	1	0	2	0	7	0
17	(Croatia)	MF	Neven Đurasek	1	0	1	0	0	0	2	0
18	(Venezuela)	FW	Kevin Kelsy	3	0	0	0	0	0	3	0
21	(Ukraine)	MF	Artem Bondarenko	4	0	1	0	1	0	6	0
22	(Ukraine)	DF	Mykola Matviyenko	1	0	1	0	1	0	3	0
23	(Brazil)	DF	Lucas Taylor	2	1	1	0	0	0	3	1
26	(Ukraine)	DF	Yukhym Konoplya	3	0	2	0	1	0	6	0
29	(Ukraine)	MF	Yehor Nazaryna	2	1	0	0	0	0	2	1
27	(Ukraine)	MF	Oleh Ocheretko	1	0	0	0	0	0	1	0
34	(Ukraine)	MF	Ivan Petryak	1	0	0	0	0	0	1	0
44	(Ukraine)	DF	Yaroslav Rakitskyi	3	0	0	0	0	0	3	0
81	(Ukraine)	GK	Anatoliy Trubin	1	1	1	0	0	0	2	1
Players away on loan:
Players who left Shakhtar Donetsk during the season:
10	(Ukraine)	MF	Mykhailo Mudryk	3	1	2	0	0	0	5	1
			TOTALS	48	4	15	0	10	0	73	4
