= 1957 Cup of the Ukrainian SSR =

The 1957 Ukrainian Cup was the 19th season of the football knockout competition conducted by the Football Federation of the Ukrainian SSR and was known as the Ukrainian Cup. Unlike previous seasons, the winner of which would qualify for the Soviet Football Cup, starting from 1957, the competition became a feeder for the new Soviet Football Cup for KFK teams.

The winner of the 1957 Ukrainian Cup, SKVO Odesa, qualified for the 1957 Soviet Amateur Cup.

== Teams ==
=== Tournament distribution ===
The competition was conducted among 23 clubs out of 80 participants of the 1957 Football Championship and 5 other non-"teams of masters" Chervonyi Prapor Lviv, Khimik Kalush, Spartak Bila Tserkva, Burevisnyk Chernivtsi, Naftovyk Drohobych.

First round (24 teams)	21 entrants from the Football Championship; 3 other entrants	
Second round (16 teams)	2 entrants from the Football Championship; 2 other entrants	12 winners from the first round

=== Non-participating "teams of masters" ===
The Ukrainian teams of masters did not take part in the competition.

- 1957 Soviet Class A: FC Dynamo Kyiv, FC Shakhtar Stalino
- 1957 Soviet Class B: FC Avanhard Kharkiv, FC Avanhard Mykolaiv, FC Khimik Dniprodzerzhynsk, FC Kolhospnyk Poltava, FC Metalurh Dnipropetrovsk, FC Metalurh Zaporizhia, FC Pischevik Odesa, FC Shakhtar Kadiivka, SKVO Lvov, SKVO Kiev, SKCF Sevastopol, FC Spartak Stanislav, FC Spartak Uzhhorod, FC Trudovi Rezervy Voroshylovhrad

== Competition schedule ==
=== First elimination round ===
FC Metalurh Kerch (Rep)	5:1	(Rep) FC Avanhard Sevastopol (Note: see PFC Sevastopol)
FC Avanhard Kramatorsk (Rep)	3:1	(Rep) FC Mashynobudivnyk Zaporizhia
SKVO Odessa (Rep)	6:0	(Rep) FC Budivelnyk Mykolaiv
FC Spartak Kherson (Note: see FC Krystal Kherson) (Rep)	8:0	(Rep) FC Kolhospnyk Cherkasy
FC Torpedo Sumy (Rep)	1:2	(Rep) FC Avanhard Voroshylovhrad
FC Torpedo Kirovohrad (Rep)	3:0	(Rep) FC Mashynobudivnyk Dnipropetrovsk
FC Kolhospnyk Berehovo (Rep)	2:1	FC Chervonyi Prapor Lviv
FC Khimik Kalush	4:0	(Rep) FC Dynamo Ternopil
FC Vinnytsia (Rep)	2:5	(Rep) FC Kolhospnyk Rivno
FC Burevisnyk Kamianets-Podilskyi (Rep)	3:2	(Rep) GDO? Lutsk
Kolhospnyk? Zhytomyr (Rep)	1:3	(Rep) Avanhard? Pryluky
FC Spartak Bila Tserkva	0:3	(Rep) FC DVRZ Kyiv

=== Second elimination round ===
Byes: Torpedo Kharkiv, Lokomotyv Poltava, Burevisnyk Chernivtsi, Naftovyk Drohobych

FC Metalurh Kerch (Rep)	1:3	(Rep) FC Avanhard Kramatorsk
SKVO Odessa (Rep)	5:0	(Rep) FC Spartak Kherson
FC Avanhard Voroshylovhrad (Rep)	0:0	(Rep) FC Torpedo Kirovohrad	(replay)
FC Torpedo Kharkiv (Rep)	1:0	(Rep) FC Lokomotyv Poltava
FC Kolhospnyk Berehovo (Rep)	2:3	FC Khimik Kalush
FC Burevisnyk Chernivtsi	2:3	FC Naftovyk Drohobych
FC Kolhospnyk Rivno (Rep)	4:2	(Rep) FC Burevisnyk Kamianets-Podilskyi
Avanhard? Pryluky (Rep)	3:2	(Rep) FC DVRZ Kyiv

Replay

FC Avanhard Voroshylovhrad (Rep)	2:1	(Rep) FC Torpedo Kirovohrad

=== Quarterfinals ===
FC Avanhard Kramatorsk (Rep)	1:3	(Rep) SKVO Odessa
FC Avanhard Voroshylovhrad (Rep)	0:4	(Rep) FC Torpedo Kharkiv
FC Khimik Kalush	2:1	FC Naftovyk Drohobych
FC Kolhospnyk Rivno (Rep)	4:0	(Rep) Avanhard? Pryluky

=== Semifinals ===
SKVO Odessa (Rep)	5:1	(Rep) FC Torpedo Kharkiv
FC Khimik Kalush	1:2	(Rep) FC Kolhospnyk Rivno

=== Final ===
The final was held in Kiev.

31 August 1957

SKVO Odessa (Rep)	2–0 (a.e.t.)	(Rep) FC Kolhospnyk Rivno

Kiev

== Top goalscorers ==
Scorer	Goals	Team
(Ukrainian Soviet Socialist Republic)	?	

Ukrainian Cup 1957 Winners

SKVO Odessa
First title

== See also ==
- Soviet Cup
- Soviet Amateur Cup
- 1956 Cup of the Ukrainian SSR
