= Anatoliy Molotay (footballer) =

Soviet-Ukrainian football coach (1937–2022)

Personal information
- Full name: Anatoliy Mykolayovych Molotay
- Date of birth: 1 November 1937
- Place of birth: Proskuriv, Kamianets-Podilskyi Oblast, Ukrainian SSR
- Date of death: 7 September 2022 (aged 84)
- Place of death: Ukraine
- Position: Midfielder

Youth career
- Lokomotyv Kyiv

Senior career*
Years	Team	Apps	(Gls)
1957	Oktyabrskiy Raion Kyiv		
1958–1962	Lokomotyv Vinnytsia	84	(3)
1962	Kolhospnyk Cherkasy	?	(1)
1963–1964	Lokomotyv Vinnytsia	67	(3)

Managerial career
- Dynamo Kyiv (academy)
- 1973–1974: Bukovyna Chernivtsi (assistant)
- 1974–1976: Bukovyna Chernivtsi
- 1977: SKA Kiev (assistant)
- 1979–1980: Dnipro Cherkasy
- 1983–1986: Dynamo Irpin (assistant)
- 1987: Dynamo Irpin
- 1989–1991: Blyskavka Baryshivka
- 1992: Hirnyk Hirne
- * Club domestic league appearances and goals

Anatoliy Mykolayovych Molotay (Ukrainian: Анатолій Миколайович Молотай; 1 November 1937 – 7 September 2022) was a Soviet-Ukrainian professional football coach and player.

Molotay was a product of an old Kyivan club Lokomotyv.

At 20 Molotay was representing the team of Oktyabrskyi Raion of the Kyiv City (later known as SC Temp Kyiv) at republican competitions of KFK.

In 1958 on the initiative of the director of Southwestern Railway Petro Kryvonos, in Vinnytsia was established another Lokomotyv club and Molotay became one of the first players of the club, with which he stayed until 1964. In 1962 he also defended colors of Kolhospnyk Cherkasy. Molotay was forced into early retirement due to a bad injury.

After retirement, Molotay was invited to coach junior players at the Dynamo's Kyiv academy. Later in 1970s he became a manager of several third-tier football clubs such as Bukovyna and Kolhospnyk. In 1983 along with Viktor Kanevsky Molotay stood at the creation of a new FC Dynamo Irpin out of the Kyivan suburbs.

Soon after Ukraine gained its independence, Molotay became a match inspector for the Football Federation of Ukraine (today Ukrainian Association of Football).
