= 1956 Cup of the Ukrainian SSR =

1956 Football Cup of the Ukrainian SSR (Ukraine)
Tournament details
- Dates: 7 October — 8 November 1956
- Teams: 32

The 1956 Ukrainian Cup was a football knockout competition conducted by the Football Federation of the Ukrainian SSR and was also known as the Football Cup of the Ukrainian SSR.

The competition was held among Ukrainian "collectives of physical culture" (KFK) that competed in the Ukrainian republican competition. The Ukrainian teams of masters that competed in the Soviet league competitions did not participate. The tournament took place at the end of the season from 7 October to 8 November 1956. It was later than usual. The competition was won by Kolhospnyk Poltava for the first time. Unlike the previous season, no teams qualified for the Soviet Cup, which was not held that year.

== Teams ==
=== Non-participating teams ===
The Ukrainian teams of masters did not take part in the competition.

- 1956 Soviet Class A (2): FC Dynamo Kyiv, FC Shakhtar Stalino
- 1956 Soviet Class B (8): FC Metalurh Zaporizhia, ODO Lvov, ODO Kyiv, FC Avanhard Kharkiv, FC Spartak Stanislav, FC Spartak Uzhhorod, FC Metalurh Dnipropetrovsk, FC Kharchovyk Odesa

== Competition schedule ==
=== First elimination round ===
| FC Shakhtar Bryanka (Rep) | 2:0 | (Rep) FC Avanhard Kramatorsk |
| Chuhuyiv team | 1:0 | (Rep) FC Torpedo Sumy |
| FC Mashynobudivnyk Zaporizhia (Rep) | 3:0 | (Rep) FC Metalurh Nikopol |
| FC Avanhard Sevastopol (Rep) | 2:2 | Yevpatoria team | 2:0 (replay) |
| m/u 29917 Chernivtsi | 1:3 | (Rep) FC Avanhard Mykolaiv |
| FC Khimik Kalush (Rep) | 1:0 | FC Torpedo Odessa |
| FC Spartak Kherson (Rep) | 4:1 | FC DVRZ Kyiv |
| FC Shakhtar Budyonnovka | 2:4 | (Rep) FC Torpedo Kharkiv | in Stalino |
| FC Burevisnyk Chernihiv | 2:3 | (Rep) FC Mashynobudivnyk Kyiv |
| FC Burevisnyk Cherkasy (Rep) | 3:0 | FC Burevisnyk Kamianets-Podilskyi |
| FC Shakhtar Novovolynsk | 0:5 | (Rep) FC Kolhospnyk Poltava |
| FC Kolhospnyk Rivno (Rep) | 1:0 | (Rep) Vinnytsia team |
| FC Naftovyk Drohobych (Rep) | 0:1 | (Rep) FC Dynamo Lviv |
| FC Dynamo Ternopil (Rep) | 7:0 | (Rep) FC Kolhospnyk Berehovo |
| FC Spartak Bila Tserkva (Rep) | 1:2 | (Rep) FC Torpedo Kirovohrad |
| FC Dynamo Zhytomyr | 1:6 | (Rep) FC Khimik Dniprodzerzhynsk |

=== Second elimination round ===
| FC Shakhtar Bryanka (Rep) | 1:1 | Chuhuyiv team | 0:1 (replay) |
| FC Mashynobudivnyk Zaporizhia (Rep) | 7:0 | (Rep) FC Avanhard Sevastopol |
| FC Avanhard Mykolaiv (Rep) | 2:0 | (Rep) FC Khimik Kalush |
| FC Spartak Kherson (Rep) | 1:3 | (Rep) FC Torpedo Kharkiv |
| FC Mashynobudivnyk Kyiv (Rep) | 5:0 | (Rep) FC Burevisnyk Cherkasy |
| FC Kolhospnyk Poltava (Rep) | 2:0 | (Rep) FC Kolhospnyk Rivno |
| FC Dynamo Lviv (Rep) | 1:3 | (Rep) FC Dynamo Ternopil |
| FC Torpedo Kirovohrad (Rep) | 2:1 | (Rep) FC Khimik Dniprodzerzhynsk |

=== Quarterfinals ===
| Chuhuyiv team | 0:1 | (Rep) FC Mashynobudivnyk Zaporizhia |
| FC Avanhard Mykolaiv (Rep) | 3:2 | (Rep) FC Torpedo Kharkiv |
| FC Mashynobudivnyk Kyiv (Rep) | 1:1 | (Rep) FC Kolhospnyk Poltava | 0:2 (replay) |
| FC Dynamo Ternopil (Rep) | 1:2 | (Rep) FC Torpedo Kirovohrad |

=== Semifinals ===
| FC Mashynobudivnyk Zaporizhia (Rep) | 3:0 | (Rep) FC Avanhard Mykolaiv |
| FC Kolhospnyk Poltava (Rep) | 4:0 | (Rep) FC Torpedo Kirovohrad |

=== Final ===
The final was held in Kyiv.

8 November 1956

| Mashynobudivnyk Zaporizhia (Rep) | 0–4 (0–1) | (Rep) Kolhospnyk Poltava |
|---|---|---|
| | Report | Yevhen Ivanov; Oleksandr Matyukhin; Volodymyr Kazankin; Oleksandr Matyukhin |

Tsentralnyi stadion imeni Khrushchova, Kyiv
Attendance: 20,000

Note: the final game took place during a snowfall.

Ukrainian Cup 1956 Winners

Kolhospnyk Poltava
First title

== See also ==
- 1956 Football Championship of the Ukrainian SSR
