= Lucas Taylor =

Brazilian footballer (born 1995)

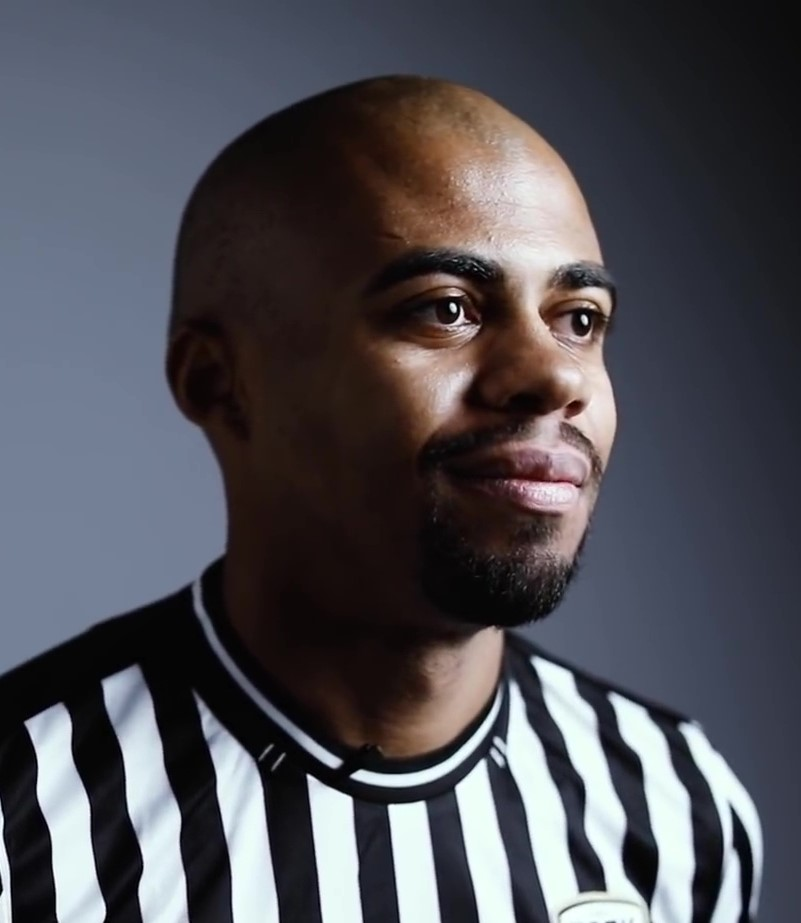
- Taylor with PAOK in 2021

Personal information
- Full name: Lucas Taylor Maia Reis
- Date of birth: 10 April 1995 (age 31)
- Place of birth: Guarulhos, Brazil
- Height: 5 ft 8 in (1.73 m)
- Position: Right wing-back

Team information
- Current team: Polissya Zhytomyr
- Number: 13

Youth career
- 2007–2015: Palmeiras

Senior career*
| Years | Team | Apps | (Gls) |
| 2015–2019 | Palmeiras | 3 | (0) |
| 2016 | → Criciúma (loan) | 3 | (0) |
| 2016 | → Paraná (loan) | 10 | (1) |
| 2017 | → Red Bull Brasil (loan) | 14 | (0) |
| 2017 | → Paysandu (loan) | 11 | (0) |
| 2018 | → Botafogo-SP (loan) | 10 | (1) |
| 2018 | → Boa Esporte (loan) | 6 | (0) |
| 2018 | → Lviv (loan) | 16 | (3) |
| 2019–2020 | Estoril | 0 | (0) |
| 2020–2021 | Dnipro-1 | 28 | (1) |
| 2021–2023 | PAOK | 17 | (0) |
| 2022–2023 | → Shakhtar Donetsk (loan) | 10 | (1) |
| 2023– | Polissya Zhytomyr | 28 | (1) |
- * Club domestic league appearances and goals as of 14 June 2025

Lucas Taylor Maia Reis (born 10 April 1995), known as Lucas Taylor, is a Brazilian professional footballer who plays as a right-back for Ukrainian Premier League club Polissya Zhytomyr.

== Club career ==
A member of Palmeiras' youth academy since 2007, Lucas Taylor began playing for the club in the under-12 category. After acting as a forward and a defensive midfielder, Taylor found his ideal position in the right back.

Lucas Taylor made good performances in the Campeonato Paulista and Brasileiro U20, calling the attention of the first team with his speed and skill. His first match as a senior player was away against Coritiba, for the Série A in August 2015. In his first season, Taylor also came as a second-half substitute for João Pedro in the Copa do Brasil Final's 2nd leg at Allianz Parque, eventually winning his first title.

His performances soon began to attract the attention of clubs in Europe. A newcomer to the Ukrainian top flight, Lviv, acquired him on loan from Palmeiras for a year.

Taylor adapted quickly and managed to score three goals and provide two assists in three appearances. He returned to Palmeiras and then moved to Portuguese second tier club Estoril on a free transfer.

For the first six months he did not get any playing time and decided to leave. Dnipro-1, who knew of him from his time in Lviv, opted to acquire him in January 2020. With his new team, Taylor played 30 times, scoring once and contributing three assists.

On 29 June 2021, Lucas Taylor signed a three-year contract with Super League Greece side PAOK, with the choice of one year extension once the contract is over, being the first transfer of the club for the upcoming season.

On 16 October 2023, Taylor joined Ukrainian Premier League side Polissya Zhytomyr.

== Career statistics ==
As of match played 23 August 2022

Appearances and goals by club, season and competition
| Club | Season | League | | | Cup | | Continental | | Other | | Total | |
| Club | Season | Division | Apps | Goals | Apps | Goals | Apps | Goals | Apps | Goals | Apps | Goals |
|---|---|---|---|---|---|---|---|---|---|---|---|---|
| Palmeiras | 2015 | Série A | 3 | 0 | 1 | 0 | — | | — | | 4 | 0 |
| Criciúma (loan) | 2016 | Série B | 3 | 0 | 0 | 0 | — | | — | | 3 | 0 |
| Paraná (loan) | 2016 | Série B | 10 | 1 | 0 | 0 | — | | — | | 10 | 1 |
| Red Bull Brasil (loan) | 2017 | Série B | 14 | 0 | 0 | 0 | — | | — | | 14 | 0 |
| Paysandu (loan) | 2017 | Série B | 11 | 0 | 0 | 0 | — | | — | | 11 | 0 |
| Botafogo-SP (loan) | 2018 | Série B | 10 | 1 | 0 | 0 | — | | — | | 10 | 1 |
| Boa Esporte (loan) | 2018 | Série B | 6 | 0 | 0 | 0 | — | | — | | 6 | 0 |
| Lviv (loan) | 2018–19 | Ukrainian Premier League | 16 | 3 | 1 | 0 | — | | — | | 17 | 3 |
| Estoril | 2019–20 | Primeira Liga | 0 | 0 | 0 | 0 | — | | 6 (Note: Appearances in Liga Revelação.) | 0 | 6 | 0 |
| Dnipro 1 | 2019–20 | Ukrainian Premier League | 6 | 1 | 0 | 0 | — | | — | | 6 | 1 |
| Dnipro 1 | 2020–21 | Ukrainian Premier League | 22 | 0 | 2 | 0 | — | | — | | 24 | 0 |
| Dnipro 1 | Total | | 28 | 1 | 2 | 0 | — | | — | | 30 | 1 |
| PAOK | 2021–22 | Super League | 17 | 0 | 2 | 0 | 10 (Note: Appearances in the UEFA Europa Conference League.) | 0 | — | | 29 | 0 |
| Shakhtar Donetsk (loan) | 2022–23 | Ukrainian Premier League | 10 | 1 | — | | 6 (Note: Five appearances in the UEFA Champions League, one appearance in the UEFA Europa League.) | 0 | 0 | 0 | 16 | 1 |
| Career total | | | 128 | 7 | 6 | 0 | 16 | 0 | 6 | 0 | 156 | 7 |

== Honours ==
Palmeiras

- Copa do Brasil: 2015

PAOK

- Greek Cup runner-up: 2021–22
