= Eduard Kozik =

Ukrainian footballer

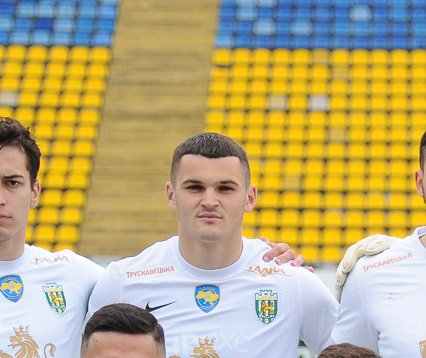

Personal information
- Full name: Eduard Serhiyovych Kozik
- Date of birth: 19 April 2003 (age 23)
- Place of birth: Hrudky, Volyn Oblast, Ukraine
- Height: 1.83 m (6 ft 0 in)
- Position: Centre-back

Team information
- Current team: Kolos Kovalivka ( on loan from Shakhtar Donetsk)
- Number: 3

Youth career
- 2015–2017: VIK-Volyn Volodymyr-Volynskyi
- 2017–2021: Shakhtar Donetsk

Senior career*
Years	Team	Apps	(Gls)
2021–	Shakhtar Donetsk	8	(0)
2022	→ Mariupol (loan)	0	(0)
2024	→ Karpaty Lviv (loan)	4	(0)
2024–	→ Kolos Kovalivka (loan)	47	(1)

International career^{‡}
2019	Ukraine U16	1	(0)
2019–2020	Ukraine U17	6	(0)
2021–2022	Ukraine U19	6	(1)
2024–2025	Ukraine U21	8	(0)
- * Club domestic league appearances and goals as of 3 June 2026 ‡ National team caps and goals as of 19 June 2025

Eduard Serhiyovych Kozik (Ukrainian: Едуард Сергійович Козік; born 19 April 2003) is a Ukrainian professional footballer who plays as a centre-back for Kolos Kovalivka, on loan from Shakhtar Donetsk.

== Career ==
Born in Hrudky, Volyn Oblast, Kozik began his career in the neighbouring VIK-Volyn Volodymyr-Volynskyi academy school system, before transferring to the Shakhtar Donetsk academy in 2019.

He played in the Ukrainian Premier League Reserves for several seasons and made his debut for the senior Shakhtar Donetsk squad in the Ukrainian Premier League, coming on as a substitute in the 82nd minute for Valeriy Bondar in a 3-0 home victory over Inhulets Petrove on 5 November 2022.
