= Valeriy Bondar =

Ukrainian footballer (born 1999)

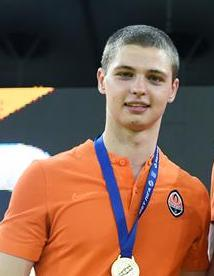
- Bondar with Shakhtar Donetsk in 2020

Personal information
- Full name: Valeriy Yuriyovych Bondar
- Date of birth: 27 February 1999 (age 27)
- Place of birth: Kharkiv, Ukraine
- Height: 1.84 m (6 ft 0 in)
- Position: Centre-back

Team information
- Current team: Shakhtar Donetsk
- Number: 5

Youth career
- 2007–2019: Shakhtar Donetsk

Senior career*
Years	Team	Apps	(Gls)
2019–	Shakhtar Donetsk	139	(6)

International career^{‡}
2015–2016	Ukraine U17	9	(1)
2017	Ukraine U18	4	(1)
2017–2018	Ukraine U19	14	(2)
2019	Ukraine U20	9	(0)
2019	Ukraine U21	3	(0)
2020–	Ukraine	12	(0)
Medal record
Men's football
Representing Ukraine
UEFA European Under-19 Championship
Bronze medal – third place	2018 Finland
FIFA U-20 World Cup
Winner	2019 Poland
- * Club domestic league appearances and goals as of 30 October 2026 ‡ National team caps and goals as of 18 November 2026

Valeriy Yuriyovych Bondar (Ukrainian: Вале́рій Ю́рійович Бо́ндар; born 27 February 1999) is a Ukrainian professional footballer who plays as a centre-back for Shakhtar Donetsk and the Ukraine national team.

== Club career ==
Bondar started playing football in Shakhtar Donetsk in 2007. In the 2018–2019 season, he played for Shakhtar in the category U21.

He made his debut for Shakhtar Donetsk in the Ukrainian Premier League in a match against Lviv on 4 May 2019.

On 27 August 2026, Shakhtar announced that they had extended their contract with Bondar until 31 July 2031.

== International career ==
On 15 June 2019, Bondar won the FIFA U-20 World Cup with the Ukraine U20 national team, whom he captained.

He made his debut for senior national team on 11 November 2020 in a friendly game against Poland. He substituted Yukhym Konoplya in the 63rd minute.

== Career statistics ==
=== Club ===
As of match played 3 November 2026

Appearances and goals by club, season and competition
Club	Season	League			Cup		Continental		Other		Total	
Club	Season	Division	Apps	Goals	Apps	Goals	Apps	Goals	Apps	Goals	Apps	Goals
Shakhtar	2018–19	Ukrainian Premier League	1	0	0	0	0	0	0	0	1	0
Shakhtar	2019–20	Ukrainian Premier League	11	1	0	0	1 (Note: Appearance(s) in UEFA Europa League)	0	0	0	12	1
Shakhtar	2020–21	Ukrainian Premier League	11	0	0	0	6 (Note: Appearance(s) in UEFA Champions League)	0	1 (Note: Appearance(s) in Ukrainian Super Cup)	0	18	0
Shakhtar	2021–22	Ukrainian Premier League	7	0	0	0	1	0	0	0	8	0
Shakhtar	2022–23	Ukrainian Premier League	26	1	0	0	9 (Note: Six appearances in UEFA Champions League, three appearances in UEFA Europa League)	0	0	0	35	1
Shakhtar	2023–24	Ukrainian Premier League	20	0	3	0	5 (Note: Four appearances in UEFA Champions League, one appearance in UEFA Europa League)	0	0	0	28	0
Shakhtar	2024–25	Ukrainian Premier League	27	0	1	0	8	0	0	0	36	0
Shakhtar	2025–26	Ukrainian Premier League	27	3	2	0	18 (Note: Six appearances in UEFA Europa League, twelve appearances and one goal in UEFA Conference League)	1	0	0	47	4
Shakhtar	2026–27	Ukrainian Premier League	9	1	2	0	4	0	—		15	1
Shakhtar	Total		139	6	8	0	52	1	1	0	200	7
Career total			139	6	8	0	52	1	1	0	200	7

=== International ===
As of match played 17 November 2026

Appearances and goals by national team and year
National team	Year	Apps	Goals
Ukraine	2020	1	0
Ukraine	2021	0	0
Ukraine	2022	2	0
Ukraine	2023	0	0
Ukraine	2024	1	0
Ukraine	2025	2	0
Ukraine	2026	6	0
Total		12	0

== Honours ==
Shakhtar Donetsk

- Ukrainian Premier League: 2018–19, 2019–20, 2022–23, 2023–24
- Ukrainian Cup: 2018–19, 2023–24, 2024–25
- Ukrainian Super Cup: 2021

Ukraine U20

- FIFA U-20 World Cup: 2019
