= 1956 Football Championship of the Ukrainian SSR =

Football Championship of UkrSSR
- Season: 1956
- Champions: Shakhtar Kadiivka
- Promoted: Kolhospnyk Poltava, Avanhard Mykolaiv, Khimik Dniprodzerzhynsk, SKCF Sevastopol, Trudovi Rezervy Voroshylovhrad, Shakhtar Kadiivka,

The 1956 Football Championship of UkrSSR were part of the 1956 Soviet republican football competitions in the Soviet Ukraine.

== Qualification group stage ==
=== Group 1 ===
Pos	Team	Pld	W	D	L	GF	GA	GD	Pts	Qualification
1	Mashynobudivnyk Kyiv	14	12	0	2	57	12	+45	24	Qualified to Final Group
2	Kolshospnyk Poltava	14	8	4	2	23	11	+12	20	Promoted to Class B
3	Chernihiv	14	7	1	6	17	22	−5	15	
4	Shakhtar Oleksandriya	14	5	4	5	14	23	−9	14	
5	Torpedo Kyiv	14	5	3	6	16	21	−5	13	
6	Zhytomyr	14	3	3	8	11	22	−11	9	
7	Torpedo Sumy	14	3	3	8	8	22	−14	9	
8	Spartak Bila Tserkva	14	3	2	9	19	32	−13	8	

=== Group 2 ===
Pos	Team	Pld	W	D	L	GF	GA	GD	Pts	Qualification
1	Kolhospnyk Rivne	14	10	1	3	31	11	+20	21	Qualified to Final Group
2	Burevisnyk Cherkasy	14	10	1	3	24	13	+11	21	
3	Lokomotyv Kyiv	14	8	3	3	22	8	+14	19	
4	Vinnytsia	14	8	0	6	33	29	+4	16	
5	Avanhard Kriukiv	14	7	1	6	22	24	−2	15	
6	Spartak Kyiv	14	5	3	6	11	22	−11	13	
7	Dynamo Khmelnytskyi	14	3	0	11	13	35	−22	6	
8	Dynamo Lutsk	14	0	1	13	6	20	−14	1	

=== Group 3 ===
Pos	Team	Pld	W	D	L	GF	GA	GD	Pts	Qualification
1	Lokomotyv Artemivsk	12	9	2	1	23	6	+17	20	Qualified to Final Group
2	Torpedo Kharkiv	12	7	2	3	17	14	+3	16	
3	Shakhtar Bryanka	12	5	4	3	15	17	−2	14	
4	Shakhtar Staline	12	4	4	4	20	20	0	12	
5	Mashynobudivnyk Dnipropetrovsk	12	4	2	6	11	20	−9	10	
6	Dynamo Kyiv	12	3	3	6	13	29	−16	9	
7	Metalurh Nikopol	12	1	1	10	10	30	−20	3	

=== Group 4 ===
Pos	Team	Pld	W	D	L	GF	GA	GD	Pts	Qualification
1	Shakhtar Kadiivka	14	8	5	1	29	6	+23	21	Qualified to Final Group
2	Metalurh Zhdanov	14	9	2	3	30	23	+7	20	
3	Khimik Severodonetsk	14	8	2	4	30	17	+13	18	
4	Enerhiya Kharkiv	14	4	4	6	20	18	+2	12	
5	Shakhtar Chystyakove	14	4	4	6	14	22	−8	12	
6	Avanhard Voroshylovhrad	14	5	2	7	17	30	−13	12	
7	Avanhard Kramatorsk	14	4	1	9	26	28	−2	9	
8	Enerhiya Osypenko	14	4	0	10	12	34	−22	8	

=== Group 5 ===
Pos	Team	Pld	W	D	L	GF	GA	GD	Pts	Qualification
1	OBO Odesa	14	12	0	2	57	12	+45	24	Qualified to Final Group
2	Torpedo Kirovohrad	14	10	2	2	41	19	+22	22	
3	Avanhard Mykolaiv	14	7	4	3	32	18	+14	18	Promoted to Class B
4	Avanhard Sevastopol	14	5	3	6	26	34	−8	13	
5	Dzerzhynsky Mine Administration Kryvyi Rih	14	6	1	7	26	37	−11	13	
6	Spartak Kherson	14	3	3	8	20	27	−7	9	
7	Enerhiya Nova Kakhovka	14	3	2	9	11	48	−37	8	
8	Burevisnyk Simferopol	14	2	1	11	17	35	−18	5	

=== Group 6 ===
Pos	Team	Pld	W	D	L	GF	GA	GD	Pts	Qualification
1	DOF Sevastopol	14	12	1	1	43	8	+35	25	Qualified to Final Group
2	Mashynobudivnyk Zaporizhia	14	10	1	3	38	18	+20	21	
3	Budivelnyk Mykolaiv	14	7	2	5	30	24	+6	16	
4	Libknekht Mine Administration Kryvyi Rih	14	6	1	7	25	32	−7	13	
5	Metalurh Odesa	14	4	4	6	25	24	+1	12	
6	Lokomotyv Lozova	14	5	2	7	14	31	−17	12	
7	Khimik Dniprodzerzhynsk	14	4	3	7	18	20	−2	11	Promoted to Class B
8	Metalurh Kerch	14	0	2	12	13	49	−36	2	

=== Group 7 ===
Pos	Team	Pld	W	D	L	GF	GA	GD	Pts	Qualification
1	Burevisnyk Vynohradiv	14	9	2	3	22	12	+10	20	Qualified to Final Group
2	Kolhospnyk Berehove	14	7	2	5	32	24	+8	16	
3	Dynamo Ternopil	14	6	4	4	19	15	+4	16	
4	Burevisnyk Mukacheve	14	7	1	6	25	21	+4	15	
5	Khimik Kalush	14	6	3	5	18	15	+3	15	
6	Burevisnyk Chernivtsi	14	5	2	7	18	22	−4	12	
7	Naftovyk Drohobych	14	3	6	5	18	26	−8	12	
8	Dynamo Lviv	14	2	2	10	11	28	−17	6	

== Final ==
Pos	Team	Pld	W	D	L	GF	GA	GD	Pts	Qualification
1	Shakhtar Kadiivka	6	3	3	0	7	3	+4	9	Play-off
2	FC Mashynobudivnyk Kyiv	6	3	3	0	10	5	+5	9	
3	ODO Odessa	6	3	2	1	13	6	+7	8	
4	DOF Sevastopol	6	3	1	2	11	8	+3	7	Promoted to Class B
5	FC Burevisnyk Vynohradiv	6	2	2	2	4	9	−5	6	
6	FC Kolhospnyk Rivno	6	1	1	4	4	10	−6	3	
7	FC Lokomotyv Artemivsk	6	0	0	6	5	13	−8	0	

== Champion's title replay series ==
- FC Shakhtar Kadiivka – FC Mashynobudivnyk Kyiv 1:1, 0:0 (replay), 2:0 (replay)

== Promotion play-off ==
- FC Kharchovyk Odessa – FC Shakhtar Kadiivka 2:1 1:1

== Ukrainian clubs at the All-Union level ==
- Class A (2): Dynamo Kyiv, Shakhtar Stalino
- Class B (8): Metalurh Zaporizhia, Metalurh Dnipropetrovsk, Spartak Uzhhorod, ODO Lviv, Spartak Stanislav, ODO Kyiv, Kharchovyk Odesa, Avanhard Kharkiv

== Number of teams by region ==
Number	Region	Team(s)	
Number	Region	Ukrainian SSR	All-Union
6 (2)	Kyiv Oblast	Mashynobudivnyk Kyiv, Torpedo Kyiv, Spartak Bila Tserkva, Lokomotyv Kyiv, Spartak Kyiv, Dynamo Kyiv (klubnaya)	Dynamo Kyiv, ODO Kyiv
5 (1)	Donetsk Oblast	Lokomotyv Artemivsk, Shakhtar Stalino (klubnaya), Metalurh Zhdanov, Shakhtar Chystiakove, Avanhard Kramatorsk	Shakhtar Stalino
5 (1)	Dnipropetrovsk Oblast	Mashynobudivnyk Dnipropetrovsk, Metalurh Nikopol, r/u imeni Dzerzhynskoho Kryvyi Rih, r/u imeni Libknekhta Kryvyi Rih, Khimik Dniprodzerzhynsk	Metalurh Dnipropetrovsk
4 (0)	Crimea	Avanhard Sevastopol, Burevisnyk Simferopol, DOF Sevastopol, Metalurh Kerch	–
4 (0)	Luhansk Oblast	Shakhtar Bryanka, Shakhtar Kadiivka, Khimik Severodonetsk, Avanhard Voroshylovhrad	–
3 (1)	Zakarpattia Oblast	Burevisnyk Vynohradove, Kolhospnyk Berehove, Burevisnyk Mukachevo	Spartak Uzhhorod
3 (1)	Kharkiv Oblast	Torpedo Kharkiv, Enerhiya Kharkiv, Lokomotyv Lozova	Avanhard Kharkiv
2 (1)	Zaporizhia Oblast	Enerhiya Osypenko, Mashynobudivnyk Zaporizhia	Metalurh Zaporizhia
2 (1)	Odesa Oblast	ODO Odesa, Metalurh Odesa	Kharchovyk Odesa
2 (0)	Mykolaiv Oblast	Budivelnyk Mykolaiv, Avanhard Mykolaiv	–
2 (0)	Kherson Oblast	Spartak Kherson, Enerhiya Nova Kakhovka	–
2 (0)	Poltava Oblast	Kolhospnyk Poltava, Avanhard Kryukiv	–
2 (0)	Kirovohrad Oblast	Shakhtar Oleksandriya, Torpedo Kirovohrad	–
1 (1)	Lviv Oblast	Dynamo Lviv	ODO Lviv
1 (1)	Ivano-Frankivsk Oblast	Khimik Kalush	Spartak Stanislav
1 (0)	Sumy Oblast	Torpedo Sumy	–
1 (0)	Chernihiv Oblast	Chernihiv	–
1 (0)	(Soviet Union) Drohobych Oblast	Naftovyk Drohobych	–
1 (0)	Vinnytsia Oblast	Vinnytsia	–
1 (0)	Zhytomyr Oblast	Zhytomyr	–
1 (0)	Chernivtsi Oblast	Burevisnyk Chernivtsi	–
1 (0)	Rivne Oblast	Kolhospnyk Rivne	–
1 (0)	Volyn Oblast	Dynamo Lutsk	–
1 (0)	Khmelnytskyi Oblast	Dynamo Khmelnytskyi	–
1 (0)	Ternopil Oblast	Dynamo Ternopil	–
1 (0)	Cherkasy Oblast	Burevisnyk Cherkasy	–
