= Yukhym Konoplya =

Ukrainian footballer (born 1999)

Yukhym Konoplya Юхи́м Конóпля
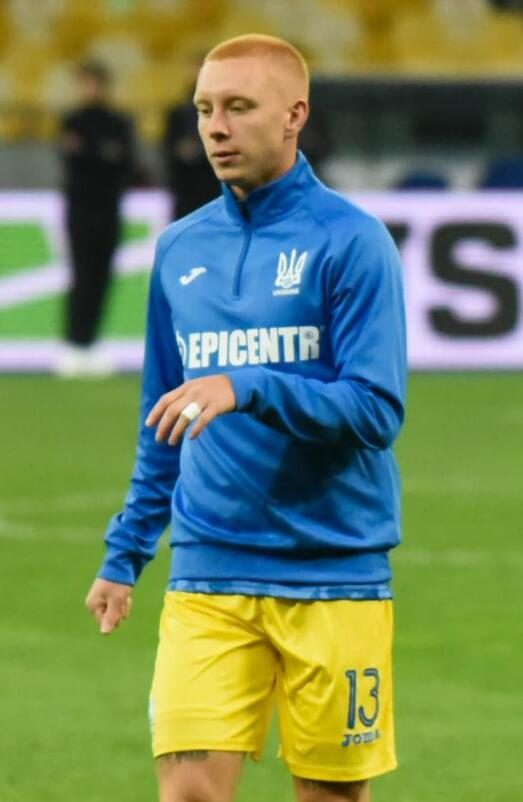
- Konoplya with Ukraine in 2020

Personal information
- Full name: Yukhym Dmytrovych Konoplya
- Date of birth: 26 August 1999 (age 27)
- Place of birth: Donetsk, Ukraine
- Height: 1.80 m (5 ft 11 in)
- Position: Right-back

Team information
- Current team: Borussia Mönchengladbach
- Number: 22

Youth career
- 2012–2017: Shakhtar Donetsk

Senior career*
| Years | Team | Apps | (Gls) |
| 2017–2026 | Shakhtar Donetsk | 79 | (6) |
| 2019–2021 | → Desna Chernihiv (loan) | 44 | (1) |
| 2026– | Borussia Mönchengladbach | 1 | (0) |

International career^{‡}
| 2014–2015 | Ukraine U17 | 7 | (0) |
| 2016 | Ukraine U18 | 1 | (0) |
| 2018 | Ukraine U19 | 4 | (0) |
| 2019 | Ukraine U20 | 8 | (0) |
| 2019–2020 | Ukraine U21 | 7 | (1) |
| 2020– | Ukraine | 27 | (2) |
Medal record
Men's football
Representing Ukraine
UEFA European Under-19 Championship
| Bronze medal – third place | 2018 Finland |
FIFA U-20 World Cup
| Winner | 2019 Poland |
- * Club domestic league appearances and goals as of 24 October 2026 ‡ National team caps and goals as of 31 March 2026

Yukhym Dmytrovych Konoplya (Ukrainian: Юхи́м Дми́трович Конóпля; born 26 August 1999) is a Ukrainian professional footballer who plays as a right-back for Bundesliga club Borussia Mönchengladbach and the Ukraine national team.

== Club career ==
=== Shakhtar Donetsk ===
Born in Donetsk, Konoplya is a product of Shakhtar Donetsk academy. He played with Shakhtar Donetsk in UEFA Youth League in the 2017–18 and 2018–19 seasons.

==== Desna Chernihiv ====
In the summer of 2019 he moved on loan to Desna Chernihiv and made his debut in the Ukrainian Premier League as a second-half substitute player in a winning home match against Vorskla Poltava on 3 August 2019. At the end of the season his club qualified for the UEFA Europa League for the first time in club history. In the summer of 2020 he agreed to extend his contract for one more year with Desna Chernihiv Konoplya played in the first European match in the history of the club against Wolfsburg in the 2020–21 UEFA Europa League third qualifying round at the AOK Stadion. On 30 September 2020 he played against Rukh Lviv in the Ukrainian Cup with the Chernihiv club qualifying for the round of 16. On 9 May 2021 he scored his first senior goal against Mariupol in the Ukrainian Premier League.

=== Shakhtar Donetsk ===
In the summer of 2021 signed with Shakhtar Donetsk. On 21 August he made his debut for the club against Chornomorets Odesa at Chornomorets Stadium. On 22 September he won his first club trophy by clinching the 2021 Ukrainian Super Cup against Dynamo Kyiv at the NSC Olimpiyskyi in Kyiv, coming on as a substitute in the 88th minute. On 3 December, he scored his first goal in the Ukrainian Premier League against Lviv.

=== Borussia Mönchengladbach ===
On 29 May 2026 Konoplya signed with Borussia Mönchengladbach.

== International career ==
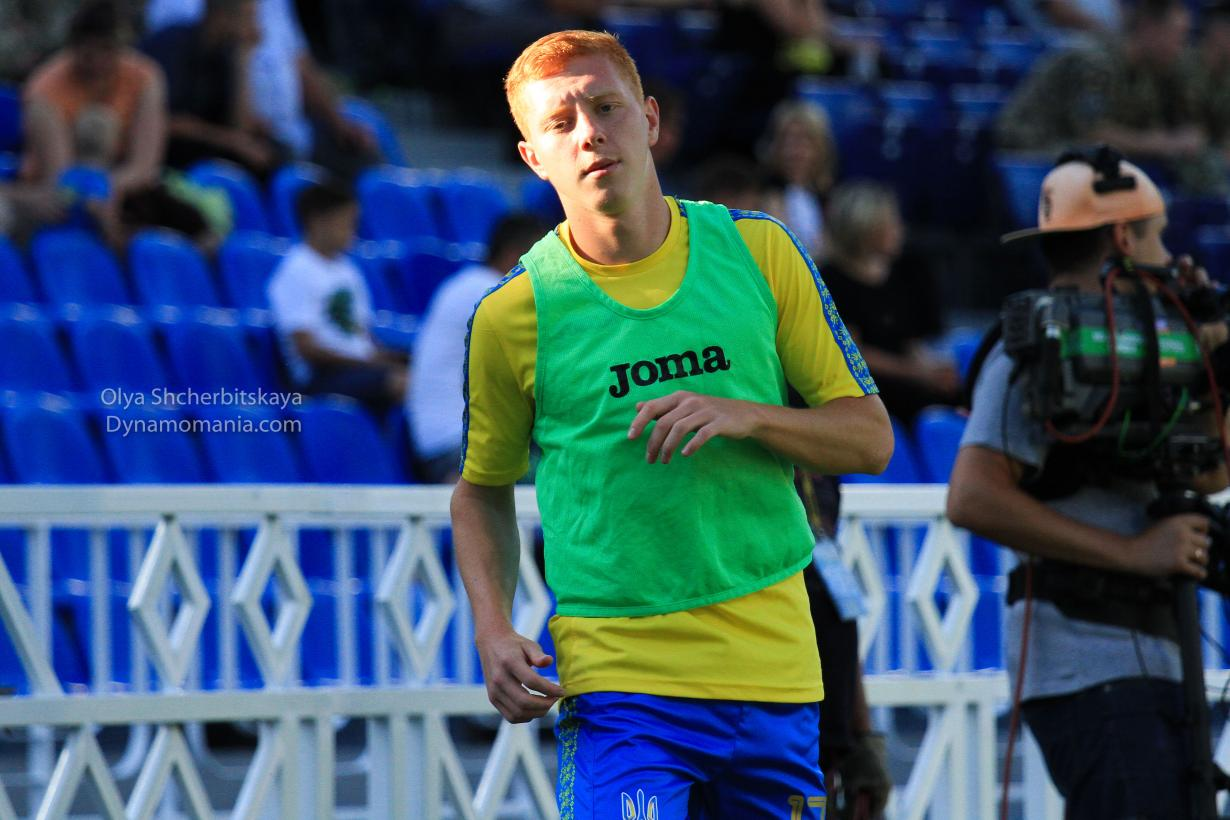
Konoplya with Ukraine U-19 in 2018

Konoplya was part of Ukraine national under-20 football team that won the 2019 FIFA U-20 World Cup. He played a key role in Ukraine's success, appearing in six of the seven matches and making four assists.

He was included in the Ukraine national under-21 football team, playing in five matches and winning the Valeriy Lobanovskyi Memorial Tournament in 2019 On 8 September 2020, he scored a goal against Finland in a 2021 UEFA European Under-21 Championship qualifier.

He was called up to the Ukrainian senior team for a friendly match against France and UEFA Nations League matches against Germany and Spain in October 2020, becoming the first Desna Chernihiv player to be called up to the national team. On 7 October he made his national debut against France at the Stade de France. On 14 November he played against Germany at Red Bull Arena in Leipzig.

In May 2024, Konoplya was called up to represent Ukraine at UEFA Euro 2024.

== Personal life ==
On 9 January 2022 he married Anastasiya Hladun. The couple has a daughter.

== Career statistics ==
=== Club ===
As of match played 27 October 2026

Appearances and goals by club, season and competition
| Club | Season | League | | | National cup (Note: Includes Ukrainian Cup.) | | Continental | | Other | | Total | |
| Club | Season | Division | Apps | Goals | Apps | Goals | Apps | Goals | Apps | Goals | Apps | Goals |
|---|---|---|---|---|---|---|---|---|---|---|---|---|
| Shakhtar Donetsk | 2017–18 | Ukrainian Premier League | 0 | 0 | 0 | 0 | 0 | 0 | 0 | 0 | 0 | 0 |
| Shakhtar Donetsk | 2018–19 | Ukrainian Premier League | 0 | 0 | 0 | 0 | 0 | 0 | 0 | 0 | 0 | 0 |
| Shakhtar Donetsk | 2021–22 | Ukrainian Premier League | 9 | 1 | 1 | 0 | 0 | 0 | 1 (Note: Appearance in Ukrainian Super Cup) | 0 | 11 | 1 |
| Shakhtar Donetsk | 2022–23 | Ukrainian Premier League | 18 | 2 | 1 | 0 | 8 (Note: Five appearances in UEFA Champions League, three appearances in UEFA Europa League) | 0 | – | | 27 | 2 |
| Shakhtar Donetsk | 2023–24 | Ukrainian Premier League | 21 | 1 | 4 | 1 | 5 (Note: Three appearances in UEFA Champions League, two appearances in UEFA Europa League) | 0 | – | | 30 | 2 |
| Shakhtar Donetsk | 2024–25 | Ukrainian Premier League | 13 | 0 | 0 | 0 | 7 (Note: Appearances in UEFA Champions League) | 0 | – | | 20 | 0 |
| Shakhtar Donetsk | 2025–26 | Ukrainian Premier League | 18 | 2 | 1 | 0 | 8 (Note: Two appearances in UEFA Europa League, six appearances in UEFA Conference League) | 0 | – | | 27 | 2 |
| Shakhtar Donetsk | Total | | 79 | 6 | 7 | 1 | 28 | 0 | 1 | 0 | 115 | 7 |
| Desna Chernihiv (loan) | 2019–20 | Ukrainian Premier League | 22 | 0 | 2 | 0 | – | | – | | 24 | 0 |
| Desna Chernihiv (loan) | 2020–21 | Ukrainian Premier League | 25 | 1 | 2 | 0 | 1 (Note: Appearance in UEFA Europa League) | 0 | – | | 28 | 1 |
| Desna Chernihiv (loan) | Total | | 47 | 1 | 4 | 0 | 1 | 0 | – | | 52 | 1 |
| Borussia Mönchengladbach | 2026–27 | Bundesliga | 1 | 0 | 1 | 0 | – | | – | | 2 | 0 |
| Career total | | | 127 | 7 | 12 | 1 | 29 | 0 | 1 | 0 | 169 | 8 |

=== International ===
As of match played 31 March 2026

Appearances and goals by national team and year
| National team | Year | Apps | Goals |
|---|---|---|---|
| Ukraine | 2020 | 3 | 0 |
| Ukraine | 2021 | 0 | 0 |
| Ukraine | 2022 | 0 | 0 |
| Ukraine | 2023 | 7 | 1 |
| Ukraine | 2024 | 10 | 1 |
| Ukraine | 2025 | 6 | 0 |
| Ukraine | 2026 | 1 | 0 |
| Total | | 27 | 2 |

| No. | Date | Venue | Opponent | Score | Result | Competition |
|---|---|---|---|---|---|---|
| 1. | 16 June 2023 | Toše Proeski Arena, Skopje, North Macedonia | North Macedonia | 2–2 | 3–2 | UEFA Euro 2024 qualifying |
| 2. | 7 September 2024 | Stadion Letná, Prague, Czech Republic | Albania | 1–0 | 1–2 | 2024–25 UEFA Nations League |

== Honours ==
Shakhtar Donetsk

- Ukrainian Premier League: 2022–23, 2023–24, 2025–26
- Ukrainian Cup: 2023–24, 2024–25
- Ukrainian Super Cup: 2021

Ukraine U21

- Valeriy Lobanovskyi Memorial Tournament: 2019

Ukraine U20

- FIFA U-20 World Cup: 2019
