= Semen Vovchenko =

Ukrainian footballer (born 1999)

Personal information
- Full name: Semen Vitaliyovych Vovchenko
- Date of birth: 13 June 1999 (age 27)
- Place of birth: Zaporizhzhia, Ukraine
- Height: 1.87 m (6 ft 2 in)
- Position: Centre-back

Team information
- Current team: Veres Rivne
- Number: 3

Youth career
- 2011–2016: Metalurh Zaporizhzhia

Senior career*
Years	Team	Apps	(Gls)
2016–2020	Zorya Luhansk	0	(0)
2020–2022	Nyva Ternopil	45	(3)
2022–	Veres Rivne	100	(5)
- * Club domestic league appearances and goals as of 14 September 2026

Semen Vitaliyovych Vovchenko (Ukrainian: Семен Віталійович Вовченко; born 13 June 1999) is a Ukrainian professional footballer who plays as a centre-back for Ukrainian club Veres Rivne.

== Career ==
In 2020 he moved to Nyva Ternopil and in August 2022 he moved to Veres Rivne.
