= 1957 Football Championship of the Ukrainian SSR =

Football Championship of UkrSSR
- Season: 1957
- Champions: SKVO Odessa
- Promoted: SKVO Odesa, Spartak Kherson, Zirka Kirovohrad, Kolhospnyk Cherkasy, Avanhard Simferopol, Lokomotyv Vinnytsia, Kolhospnyk Rivno, Lokomotyv Stalino

The 1957 Football Championship of UkrSSR were part of the 1957 Soviet republican football competitions in the Soviet Ukraine.

== First group stage ==
=== Group 1 ===
Pos	Team	Pld	W	D	L	GF	GA	GD	Pts	Qualification
1	Mashynobudivnyk Kyiv	10	8	1	1	30	10	+20	17	Qualified to Final Group
2	Kolhospnyk Cherkasy	10	2	6	2	17	14	+3	10	Promoted to Class B
3	Torpedo Sumy	10	3	4	3	14	15	−1	10	
4	Torpedo Kyiv	10	2	4	4	15	14	+1	8	
5	Avanhard Kriukiv	10	3	2	5	18	24	−6	8	
6	Avanhard Pryluky	10	3	1	6	13	30	−17	7	

=== Group 2 ===
Pos	Team	Pld	W	D	L	GF	GA	GD	Pts	Qualification
1	Zhovtnevyi Raion Kyiv	10	7	1	2	23	8	+15	15	Qualified to Final Group
2	Spartak Kherson	10	7	1	2	24	9	+15	15	Promoted to Class B
3	Torpedo Kirovohrad	10	5	3	2	15	11	+4	13	Promoted to Class B
4	Shakhtar Oleksandriya	10	3	2	5	13	18	−5	8	
5	Lokomotyv Poltava	10	3	2	5	8	16	−8	8	
6	Spartak Kharkiv	10	0	1	9	6	27	−21	1	

=== Group 3 ===
Pos	Team	Pld	W	D	L	GF	GA	GD	Pts	Qualification
1	Kolhospnyk Rivne	10	8	0	2	35	7	+28	16	Qualified to Final Group
2	Kolhospnyk Berehove	10	4	3	3	15	15	0	11	
3	FC Vinnytsia	10	3	4	3	13	17	−4	10	Promoted to Class B
4	GDO Lutsk	10	4	2	4	16	18	−2	10	
5	Burevisnyk Kamianets-Podilskyi	10	2	4	4	15	17	−2	8	
6	Chervona Zirka Malyn	10	1	3	6	9	29	−20	5	

=== Group 4 ===
Pos	Team	Pld	W	D	L	GF	GA	GD	Pts	Qualification
1	Avanhard Ordzhonikidze	14	8	5	1	20	6	+14	21	Qualified to Final Group
2	Shakhtar Makiivka	14	7	6	1	24	4	+20	20	
3	Metalurh Yenakieve	14	6	6	2	21	9	+12	18	
4	Vahonobudivnyk Kremenchuk	14	6	4	4	21	14	+7	16	
5	Khimik Shostka	14	4	4	6	12	23	−11	12	
6	Suputnyk Poltava	14	1	8	5	7	14	−7	10	
7	Dzerzhynets Dzerzhynsk	14	2	4	8	15	32	−17	8	
8	Donetsk Izyum	14	2	3	9	11	29	−18	7	

=== Group 5 ===
Pos	Team	Pld	W	D	L	GF	GA	GD	Pts	Qualification
1	Shakhtar Budyonivka	10	8	0	2	28	10	+18	16	Qualified to Final Group
2	FC Chuhuiv	10	6	1	3	17	11	+6	13	
3	Khimik Severodonetsk	10	4	3	3	21	7	+14	11	
4	Torpedo Kharkiv	10	4	2	4	11	12	−1	10	
5	Avanhard Kramatorsk	10	3	1	6	9	24	−15	7	
6	Avanhard Voroshylovhrad	10	1	1	8	6	28	−22	3	

=== Group 6 ===
Pos	Team	Pld	W	D	L	GF	GA	GD	Pts	Qualification
1	Lokomotyv Artemivsk	10	7	3	0	27	13	+14	17	Qualified to Final Group
2	Shakhtar Sverdlovsk	10	4	2	4	22	17	+5	10	
3	Shakhtar Chystyakove	10	3	4	3	14	15	−1	10	
4	Mashynobudivnyk Dnipropetrovsk	10	3	4	3	18	23	−5	10	
5	Shakhtar Bryanka	10	3	2	5	14	18	−4	8	
6	Dynamo Kharkiv	10	2	1	7	9	18	−9	5	

=== Group 7 ===
Pos	Team	Pld	W	D	L	GF	GA	GD	Pts	Qualification
1	SKVO Odesa	10	7	2	1	33	7	+26	16	Qualified to Final Group
2	Kolhospnyk Melitopol	10	5	1	4	25	14	+11	11	
3	Metalurh Kerch	10	5	0	5	18	23	−5	10	
4	Budivelnyk Mykolaiv	10	4	1	5	12	16	−4	9	
5	Burevisnyk Simferopil	10	3	3	4	12	18	−6	9	Promoted to Class B
6	Avanhard Sevastopil	10	2	1	7	8	30	−22	5	

=== Group 8 ===
Pos	Team	Pld	W	D	L	GF	GA	GD	Pts	Qualification
1	Dynamo Ternopil	10	7	2	1	17	8	+9	16	Qualified to Final Group
2	Lokomotyv Kyiv	10	6	2	2	20	10	+10	14	
3	Kolhospnyk Zhytomyr	10	4	4	2	13	9	+4	12	
4	DRVZ Kyiv	10	3	1	6	10	12	−2	7	
5	Shakhtar Novovolynsk	10	2	2	6	8	13	−5	6	
6	Torpedo Fastiv	10	1	1	8	8	24	−16	3	

=== Group 9 ===
Pos	Team	Pld	W	D	L	GF	GA	GD	Pts	Qualification
1	Mashynobudivnyk Zaporizhia	10	7	2	1	28	6	+22	16	Qualified to Final Group
2	Metalurh Nikopol	10	5	3	2	14	8	+6	13	
3	Dzerzhynsky Mine Administration Kryvyi Rih	10	4	3	3	20	14	+6	11	
4	Torpedo Osypenko	10	5	1	4	21	13	+8	11	
5	Metalurh Zhdanov	10	2	4	4	15	17	−2	8	
6	Enerhiya Nova Kakhovka	10	0	1	9	4	34	−30	1	

== Final ==
Pos	Team	Pld	W	D	L	GF	GA	GD	Pts	Qualification
1	SKVO Odessa	8	5	3	0	20	4	+16	13	Play-off
2	FC Lokomotyv Artemivsk	8	6	0	2	14	11	+3	12	Promoted to Class B
3	FC Mashynobudivnyk Kyiv	8	3	3	2	17	10	+7	9	
4	Shakhtar Budyonivka	8	3	3	2	15	14	+1	9	
5	FC Mashynobudivnyk Zaporizhia	8	2	4	2	11	6	+5	8	
6	FC Kolhospnyk Rivno	8	3	2	3	9	9	0	8	Promoted to Class B
7	Naftovyk Drohobych	8	1	5	2	9	10	−1	7	
8	Zhovtnevyi District Kyiv	8	2	2	4	8	10	−2	6	
9	Dynamo Ternopil	8	0	0	8	2	31	−29	0	

== Promotion play-off ==
- FC Shakhtar Kadiivka – SKVO Odessa 0:2 0:2

== Ukrainian clubs at the All-Union level ==
- Class A (2): Dynamo Kyiv, Shakhtar Stalino
- Class B (14): Avanhard Kharkiv, Metalurh Zaporizhia, SKCF Sevastopol, Trudovi Rezervy Voroshylovhrad, Shakhtar Kadiivka, Spartak Stanislav, SKVO Lviv, Metalurh Dnipropetrovsk, Kharchovyk Odesa, SKVO Kyiv, Spartak Uzhhorod, Kolhospnyk Poltava, Avanhard Mykolaiv, Khimik Dniprodzerzhynsk

== Number of teams by region ==
Number	Region	Team(s)	
Number	Region	Ukrainian SSR	All-Union
8 (1)	Donetsk Oblast	Shakhtar Makiivka, Metalurh Yenakieve, Dzerzhynets Dzerzhynsk, Shakhtar Budyonivka, Avanhard Kramatorsk, Lokomotyv Artemivsk, Shakhtar Chystiakove, Metalurh Zhdanov	Shakhtar Stalino
6 (2)	Kyiv Oblast	Mashynobudivnyk Kyiv, Torpedo Kyiv, Zhovtnevyi Raion (Temp) Kyiv, Lokomotyv Kyiv, DRVZ Kyiv, Torpedo Fastiv	Dynamo Kyiv, SKVO Kyiv
5 (1)	Kharkiv Oblast	Spartak Kharkiv, Donets Izyum, Chuhuiv, Torpedo Kharkiv, Dynamo Kharkiv	Avanhard Kharkiv
4 (2)	Dnipropetrovsk Oblast	Avanhard Ordzhonikidze, Mashynobudivnyk Dnipropetrovsk, Metalurh Nikopol, r/u imeni Dzerzhynskoho Kryvyi Rih	Metalurh Dnipropetrovsk, Khimik Dniprodzerzhynsk
4 (2)	Luhansk Oblast	Khimik Severodonetsk, Avanhard Voroshylovhrad, Shakhtar Sverdlovsk, Shakhtar Bryanka	Trudovi Rezervy Voroshylovhrad, Shakhtar Kadiivka
3 (1)	Crimea	Metalurh Kerch, Burevisnyk Simferopol, Avanhard Sevastopol	SKCF Sevastopol
3 (1)	Zaporizhia Oblast	Kolhospnyk Melitopol, Mashynobudivnyk Zaporizhia, Torpedo Osypenko	Metalurh Zaporizhia
3 (1)	Poltava Oblast	Avanhard Kryukiv, Vahonobudivnyk Kremenchuk, Sputnyk Poltava	Kolhospnyk Poltava
2 (0)	Kherson Oblast	Spartak Kherson, Enerhiya Nova Kakhovka	–
2 (0)	Kirovohrad Oblast	Shakhtar Oleksandriya, Torpedo Kirovohrad	–
2 (0)	Sumy Oblast	Torpedo Sumy, Khimik Shostka	–
2 (0)	Zhytomyr Oblast	Chervona Zirka Malyn, Kolhospnyk Zhytomyr	–
2 (0)	Volyn Oblast	GDO Lutsk, Shakhtar Novovolynsk	–
1 (1)	Zakarpattia Oblast	Kolhospnyk Berehove	Spartak Uzhhorod
1 (1)	Odesa Oblast	SKVO Odesa	Kharchovyk Odesa
1 (1)	Mykolaiv Oblast	Budivelnyk Mykolaiv	Avanhard Mykolaiv
1 (0)	Chernihiv Oblast	Avanhard Pryluky	–
0 (1)	Lviv Oblast	–	SKVO Lviv
0 (1)	Ivano-Frankivsk Oblast	–	Spartak Stanislav
1 (0)	Vinnytsia Oblast	Vinnytsia	–
1 (0)	Rivne Oblast	Kolhospnyk Rivne	–
1 (0)	Khmelnytskyi Oblast	Burevisnyk Kamianets-Podilskyi	–
1 (0)	Ternopil Oblast	Dynamo Ternopil	–
1 (0)	Cherkasy Oblast	Kolhospnyk Cherkasy	–
0 (0)	(Soviet Union) Drohobych Oblast	–	–
0 (0)	Chernivtsi Oblast	–	–
