= NK Veres Rivne =

Ukrainian football club

Veres Rivne
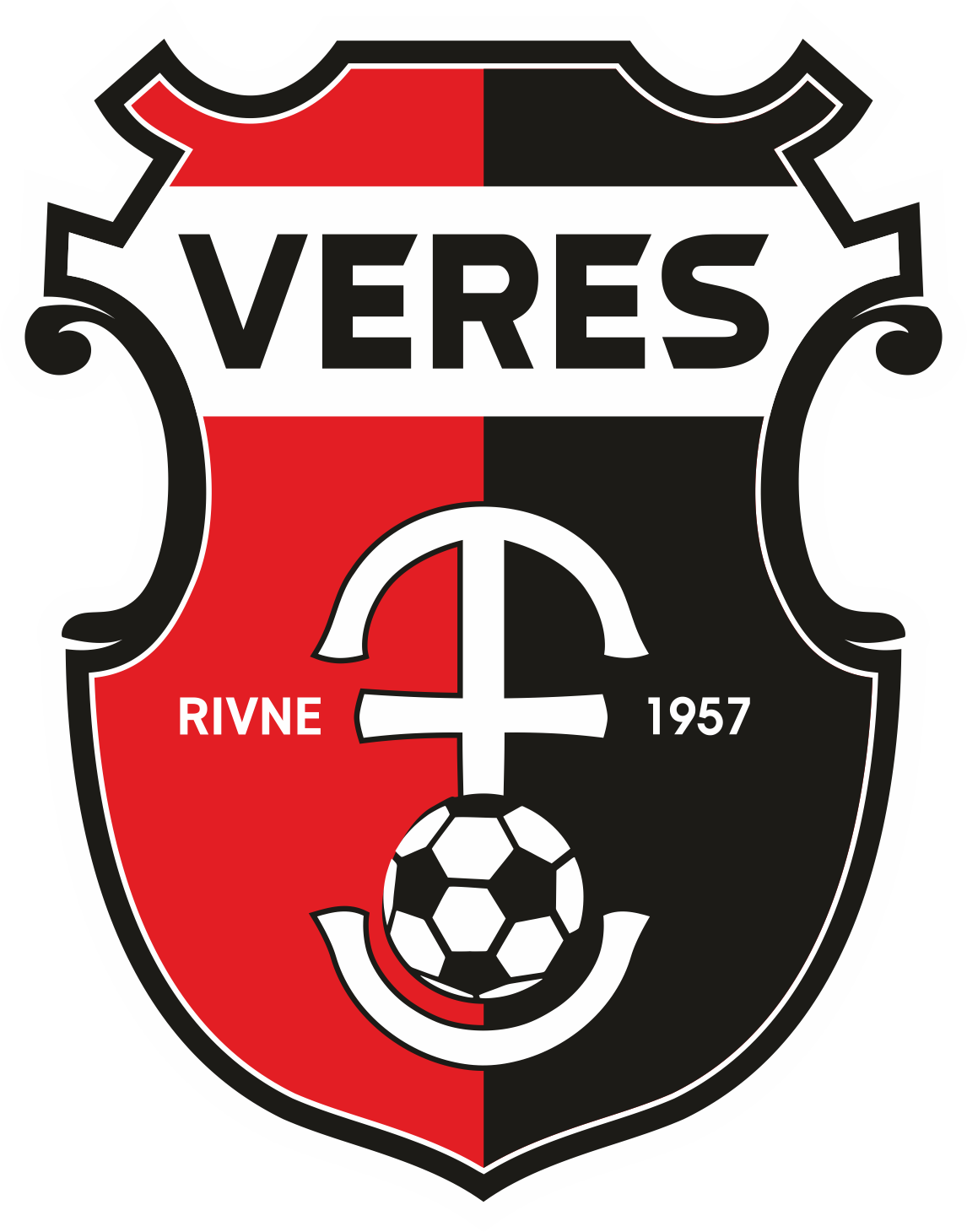
- Full name: Narodnyy Klub Veres Rivne
- Nickname: Wolves
- Founded: 1957; 69 years ago
- Ground: Avanhard Stadium (until 2016); Izotop Stadium, Varash (2016–17, since 2018); Arena Lviv (2017–18); Kolos Stadium, Mlyniv (2018–21); Avanhard Stadium, Lutsk (since 2021)
- Owner(s): Ivan Nadyein (73.33%); Rivne Football Club "Veres-Rivne" (26.67%)
- General Director: Anton Nazaruk
- Manager: Oleh Shandruk
- League: Ukrainian Premier League
- 2025–26: Ukrainian Premier League, 11th of 16
- Website: nkveres.com
Home colours	Away colours	Third colours

Narodnyy Klub Veres Rivne (Ukrainian: РНК «Верес») is a Ukrainian professional football club based in Rivne. The club competes in the Ukrainian Premier League, the top tier of Ukrainian football, after winning the 2020–21 Ukrainian First League. Their home stadium until 2017 was Avanhard Stadium in Rivne. From that time, till September 2022 the club played its home matches at Avanhard Stadium in Lutsk. Since September 2022, all home matches are played in partially renovated Avanhard Stadium.

Founded in 1957, Veres first promoted to Ukrainian Premier League in 1992, and spent there 5 seasons in total over three periods. They achieved their best result of 6th place in 2017–18 season. Veres also reached the semi-finals of 1993–94 Ukrainian Cup.

The team ran into financial difficulties after the winter break of the 2010–11 season and was removed from the Ukrainian Second League. It was reinstated and resumed playing in the same league in 2015. The home uniform consists of red shirt with black shorts; the away uniform is all black.

== History ==
=== Soviet times ===
The team was founded in 1957 as Kolhospnyk (collective farm worker) and played the 1958 season in the Class B Third Zone, finishing 14th of the 16 teams that participated. The team played 13 seasons in Class B. The best results came in the 1968 and 1969 seasons when the team placed 7th. In 1966, it changed its name to Horyn after the river that flows in Volhynia.

After the reorganization of the Championship of the USSR in 1971, Horyn played in the Second League of the Ukrainian Zone until the fall of the Soviet Union. In 1972, the club became part of the all-Ukrainian Avanhard voluntary sports society and changed its name to Avanhard. In the first season in the Second League of the Ukrainian Zone Avanhard placed 26th. Starting in the late 1970s Avangard started progressing and in 1981 under the management of two famous Dynamo Kyiv players Viktor Matvienko and Volodymyr Troshkin Avanhard got 3rd place. Nine years later under the management of Viktor Pokora Avanhard placed 3rd again.

=== Three seasons in Vyshcha Liha ===
During the fall of the Soviet Union it changed its name again to Veres (heather) and was placed in the 1992 Ukrainian First League. In the same season, Veres placed first and was promoted to the Vyshcha Liha. In their first season in Vyshcha, Veres placed last but wasn't relegated because the league was expanded. The following season was the most successful in the club's history. The team was 4th at the mid-way point, beating teams like FC Dnipro Dnipropetrovsk, FC Metalist Kharkiv, FC Shakhtar Donetsk, defeating FC Dynamo Kyiv in the Ukrainian Cup to reach the semi-final. But during the second half, Veres fell to 12th place. During the 1994–95 season, their second in the Premier League, Veres struggled and was relegated to the Ukrainian Second League.

=== Liquidation in 2011 ===
After relegation from the Ukrainian First League, Veres remained in the Second League until 2011 when, after 54 years as a professional football club, Veres declared bankruptcy and was liquidated.

=== The huge People's Club project ===
On 19 March 2015, the club was reinstated as Public Union Rivne Football Club Veres Rivne by two Ukrainian public organizations "Rivne City Football Federation" and "Rivne Oblast Football Federation". The chairman of the Public Union became a well known businessman of Rivne Oblast Oleksiy Khakhlyov, a son-in-law of former President of Ukraine Viktor Yushchenko (check also FC Nafkom Brovary). It was the first club in Ukraine to have club membership among its fans and as of May 21 had over 3,500 members (3,728 in 2016). Khakhlyov initiated a powerful promotion campaign in social media such as Facebook ("the 12th player") to reflect popularity of the newly created club. The club was announced as "PEOPLE's" (Narodnyi). During the campaign members of the new club claimed that the club accepts no outsiders, only Rivne natives. About that fact even commented one of Ukrainian football journalist Artur Valerko complementing it as appealing, interesting, and seems like a "policy of Athletic Bilbao". The club's statute also stated that no one unrelated to Rivne Oblast may sponsor or in any way participate in the club. The idea of people's club is not new and previously for propaganda was used when FC Prykarpattia Ivano-Frankivsk transformed into FC Spartak Ivano-Frankivsk back in 2003 as People's Football Club Spartak Ivano-Frankivsk (NFK Spartak Ivano-Frankivsk).

In the 2015–16 Ukrainian Second League season, Veres finished in second place and was promoted to the Ukrainian First League. The promotion was widely celebrated at the Rivne city central square (Maidan Nezalezhnosti). Following the success Khakhlyov came out and announced, "I appeared in front of perspective that "Veres" wants to play in the First League, but there are no money. Membership contributions, help of the budget and sponsors are not enough. We gathered, conditionally speaking, 5 million, but need 15. Why 15? It is a simple thing. I cannot live without a dream. The dream was not only revive "Veres", but to get promoted to the First League. They were looking at me as on an idiot. Now I have a dream that "Veres" in the Premier League, Veres among elites of Ukrainian football. We will be realizing it".

Logo of "Limo"

After the end of the 2015–16 Ukrainian Second League season, the club was reconstituted as a limited liability company TOV FC Veres-Rivne by the Public Union "Rivne Football Club Veres Rivne" and Lviv Refrigerating Company "Limo", with the latter becoming the majority holder with a 61% stake. (Note: TOV is a Ukrainian acronym for limited liability company (Ukrainian: товариство з обмеженою відповідальністю, tovarystvo z obmezhenoiu vidpovidalnistiu).) The Veres-Rivne company headed by Ihor Dedyshyn was founded to manage the club. Previously Dedyshyn was a sports journalist, football manager of FC Karpaty Lviv, and a manager of Lviv media company "ZIK". "Limo" whose final beneficiary is Bohdan Kopytko will cover the budget costs of approximately ₴15 million for the 2016–17 Ukrainian First League season. The goal for the season was to achieve promotion to the Ukrainian Premier League. The club FC Veres-Rivne received certification (attestation) to play in the PFL competitions from the Football Federation of Ukraine signed by O.Bandurko and Yu.Zapisotskyi (acting head of the FFU committee on licensing of clubs).

Following the reorganization from People's Club (NK) Veres Rivne to FC Veres-Rivne, the Rivne internet newspaper "Chetverta Vlada" called for explanation to Oleksiy Khakhlyov, whether the club is still "People's". Khakhlyov answered that the club was "People's", is "People's", and will be "People's". He then added, "the Public Union which had a certification as a professional club to play football in the 2015–16 Ukrainian Second League. There are property terms. In regards to special requirements to the teams that play in professional sports, there are certain requirements in regards to certification of professional clubs. It cannot be a "Public Union", because our "Public Union" a priory is a non-profit organization".

In the beginning of March 2017 the supervisory board of NK Veres Rivne announced that will not hold meeting as the club's leadership failed to submit the club's financial report for 2016. The supervisory board that was created in May 2015 was set up with controlling functions of the club, but has been ignored by the club's leadership.

=== 2017: Desna vs Veres promotion scandal ===
On 1 June 2017, it was announced that second-place club FC Desna Chernihiv was denied a license to play in the top division. The argument was that the club was not able to provide guarantees for adequate financing of infrastructure. The license was granted to NK Veres Rivne, the third-place team during the previous season in the second division.

Both clubs, FC Desna Chernihiv and NK Veres Rivne, had not played at their home stadiums in the 2016–17 Ukrainian First League. Desna had played in Kyiv at the Obolon Arena, while Veres played in Varash, at the Izotop Stadium of the Rivne Nuclear Power Plant. The administration of Desna released a letter of protest before a meeting of FFU representatives. In protest, the Desna administration announced that the club would not play its final game of the season against FC Illichivets Mariupol, but later relented. Nonetheless, during the game, players of both teams protested on the field in a special way: when the whistle was blown the players, instead of starting play, stood around kicking a ball back and forth among themselves.

On 2 June 2017, upon conclusion of its conference, the UPL administration announced the final composition of the league and calendar for the upcoming season. The conference confirmed the admission of Veres to the league, with only one vote against, from FC Dynamo Kyiv; six votes in favour of the decision; and three (including FC Zorya Luhansk) abstentions. On 2 June 2017, the Desna fans were picketing the House of Football in Kyiv after they arrived on four buses from Chernihiv.

On 7 June 2017, sports media UA-Football requested permission from Football Federation of Ukraine and FC Desna Chernihiv to publish related documents to clarify the situation and come to some kind of closure.

A number of football experts commented negatively on the situation, while the PFC Sumy head coach Anatoliy Bezsmertnyi stated sarcastically that these football functionaries would make Veres the national champions by decree. The former PFL president Svyatoslav Syrota said that the FFU vice-president was lying about Desna's problems. President of FC Inhulets Petrove, Oleksandr Porovoznyuk, called on other clubs to withdraw their teams from the league in support for FC Desna Chernihiv. President of FC Hirnyk-Sport Horishni Plavni Petro Kaplun stated that it made him laugh when the president of Veres, Oleksiy Khakhlev, asked that the regulations be followed, pointing out that Veres had been admitted to the Second League in complete disregard of the regulations. Kaplun also called on the FFU authorities to pay attention to what owners of professional clubs had to say as they have a right to express their vote of confidence or non-confidence in the FFU leadership.

=== Ukrainian Premier League successes ===
In June 2017, Veres was taken over by Lviv businessman Bohdan Kopytko who was suspected of having ties with organized crime, and who was known under the nickname "Kopyto". Kopytko also owns the Lviv refrigerating company "Limo" and became an honorary president of NK Veres Rivne. On 27 March 2018, Kopytko became the president of Veres after Oleksiy Khakhlyov resigned. Khakhlyov claimed that he left his position because of possible conflict of interest between his positions with the club and with the Football Federation of Ukraine and the Football Federation of Rivne Oblast.

On 17 January 2018, NK Veres-Rivne officially re-registered as a Lviv-based club. On 19 February 2018, the Rivne city council announced that it would stop sponsoring the club because of its relocation to Lviv. On 13 March 2018, Veres became a provisional member of the Lviv Oblast Football Federation.

Finally, NK Veres Rivne took sixth place in the 2017–18 Ukrainian Premier League after a controversy which preceded the match of Round 31 with FC Shakhtar Donetsk in Kharkiv.

=== Castling of the big People's Club with FC Lviv ===
On 21 May 2018, news broke in Lviv that a type of "castling" (swap) was to take place between NK Veres Rivne and FC Lviv after which FC Lviv would advance straight to the Premier League, while NK Veres would join the lower league instead of Lviv. According to the official club's legend the big People's Club Veres Rivne was merged with the Second League FC Lviv and was recreated with admitting reinstated another no less bigger People's Club Veres in the Second League despite the Ukrainian Association of Football requirements to participate in amateur competitions before applying for professional competitions. One possible reason for the merger was that renovations at the club's home field, Avanhard Stadium, were suspended by the local authorities and had not yet recommenced. The Rivne-based media were claiming that the club is simply being renamed as FC Lviv.

On 21 May 2018, a letter signed by Kopytko that was published on the official website of the club confirmed the intention of the club's administration to merge with FC Lviv.

After the last game of the 2017–18 season with FC Mariupol, the club's fans were attacked by security group of Bohdan Kopytko including the general director of the club Andriy Pankiv.

Following the club's decision to merge with FC Lviv, some players announced that they would resign from the club. According to FootballHub, the following individuals had already left the club: players Yevhen Morozenko, Stanislav Kulish, Denys Kozhanov, Dmytro Fastov, Pavlo Lukyanchuk, Mykyta Kamenyuka, as well as sports director Anatoliy Sorokin, and some other staff members. According to Mykola Nesenyuk (FC Dynamo Kyiv department director in relations with mass media), the new NK Veres Rivne had no connection to the previous Veres club. During the interview to Channel 24 in May 2018 Nesenyuk who is native of Rivne added that the whole project with "People's Club" seems as a hoax.

On 12 June 2018 the FFU licensing committee headed by Anatoliy Bezsmertnyi announced that FC Lviv failed certification to play in the Second League, while FC Veres is certified to play in the Premiers.

In the 2018–19 season, the new NK Veres Rivne is set to play in the 2018–19 Ukrainian Second League with Oleksiy Khakhlyov as president and with a home stadium in Rivne Oblast.

In May 2019 it became clear that Veres was transformed into joint stock company consisting of public association Rivne football club Veres–Rivne, UkrTeplo (Rivneteploenerho), and Rivne city council (Avanhard Stadium).

=== Team names ===
Year	Name
1958–66	Kolhospnyk
1966–72	Horyn
1972–90	Avanhard
1991–	Veres

=== Sponsors ===
Period	Shirt sponsor
2015–	(Ukraine) Limo, Inter Beton

Period	Football kit sponsor
2015–2016	(Spain) Joma
2016–2017	(Spain) Kelme
2017–2018	(Spain) Joma
2018–2019	(Italy) Legea
2019–2021	(United States) Nike
2021–	(Spain) Kelme

== Honors ==
- Cup of the Ukrainian SSR
  - Runners-up (2): 1957, 1991
- Ukrainian First League
  - Winners (2): 1992, 2020–21
- Ukrainian Second League
  - Runners-up (1): 2015–16

== Players ==
=== Current squad ===
As of 7 September 2026

Note: Flags indicate national team as defined under FIFA eligibility rules; some limited exceptions apply. Players may hold more than one non-FIFA nationality.

No.	Pos.	Nation	Player
1	GK	UKR	Pavlo Stefanyuk
2	DF	UKR	Maksym Smiyan
3	DF	UKR	Semen Vovchenko
4	DF	SLO	Kai Cipot
5	DF	UKR	Pavlo Bahriy
6	MF	RWA	David Niyo
7	FW	BRA	Fabrício Yan
9	FW	AUS	Nathanael Blair
11	MF	BRA	Wesley Pomba
14	MF	UKR	Ihor Kharatin
17	DF	UKR	Mykhaylo Protasevych
18	MF	UKR	Vitaliy Boyko

No.	Pos.	Nation	Player
19	FW	POR	André Gonçalves (on loan from Polissya Zhytomyr)
20	FW	GAM	Alagie Wally
22	DF	GRE	Konstantinos Stamoulis
23	FW	UKR	Mykyta Aleksandrov
30	MF	GEO	Luka Khokhashvili
44	DF	UKR	Danyil Checher
53	DF	BRA	Andrey Santos (on loan from Sabah FK)
77	MF	UKR	Vladyslav Sharay
80	FW	BRA	Guilherme Bahia
88	MF	UKR	Rostyslav Baran
91	GK	UKR	Valentyn Horokh

=== Out on loan ===
Note: Flags indicate national team as defined under FIFA eligibility rules; some limited exceptions apply. Players may hold more than one non-FIFA nationality.

No.	Pos.	Nation	Player

== Notable players ==
Had international caps for their respective countries. Players whose name is listed in bold represented their countries while playing for Veres Rivne.

Ukraine

- (Ukraine) Mykola Ishchenko
- (Ukraine) Mykyta Kamenyuka
- (Ukraine) Ihor Kharatin
- (Ukraine) Vasyl Kobin
- (Ukraine) Denys Kozhanov
- (Ukraine) Yuriy Moroz
- (Ukraine) Oleksandr Palyanytsya
- (Ukraine) Oleksandr Svystunov

Europe

- (Belarus) Ihar Hurynovich
- (Belarus) Pavel Radnyonak
- (Estonia) Vladislav Kreida
- (Georgia (country)) Vakhtang Khvadagiani
- (Lithuania) Gintaras Kvitkauskas
- (Moldova) Andrei Cojuhar
- (Moldova) Mihail Ghecev

Soviet Union

- (Soviet Union) Yuri Susloparov

Africa

- (The Gambia) Alagie Wally

== Coaches and administration ==
Administration	Coaching (senior team)	Coaching (U-19 team)
President – (Ukraine) Ivan Nadyein; Vice-president – (Ukraine) Myron Chernetskyi; Vice-president – (Ukraine) Yuriy Falko; Vice-president – (Ukraine) Mykhaylo Volynets; Acting club manager – (Ukraine) Yuriy Pryvarskyi; Deputy general director – (Ukraine) Orest Bal; Executive director – (Ukraine) Mykola Cheshchevoy; Advisor to the president – (Ukraine) Nataliya Lozovska; Sporting director – (Ukraine) Yuriy Habovda; Security officer – (Ukraine) Volodymyr Dzyubak; Acting director of Veres Academy – (Ukraine) Ihor Tarnopolskyi; Photographer – (Ukraine) Oleksandr Makarchuk; Press secretary – (Ukraine) Oleksandr Mychko	Head coach – (Ukraine) Oleh Shandruk; Assistant manager – (Ukraine) Oleh Herasymyuk; Assistant manager – (Ukraine) Roman Handzyn; Goalkeeping coach – (Ukraine) Yuriy Kosobutskyi; Fitness coach – (Ukraine) Maksym Kozlyuk; Analytics coach – (Ukraine) Nazar Stetsiy; Nachalnyk komandy – (Ukraine) Anatoliy Kolomiyets; Administrator – (Ukraine) Serhiy Litvinchuk; Head of medical staff – (Ukraine) Oleh Temnyk; Physiotherapist – (Ukraine) Dmytro Solonko; Physiotherapist – (Ukraine) Dmytro Hembytskyi	Head coach – (Ukraine) Stanislav Upilkov; Assistant manager – (Ukraine) Mykola Kashevskyi; Goalkeeping coach – (Ukraine) Yevhen Sokolov; Administrator – (Ukraine) Serhiy Voznyuk

== Coaches ==
- (Soviet Union) Konstantin Shchegotsky (1957, 1966)
- (Soviet Union) Tiberiy Popovich (1961)
- (Soviet Union) Evgeny Pestov (1971–72)
- (Soviet Union) Nikolai Mikhalev (1973)
- (Soviet Union) Viktor Lukashenko (1974–1976)
- (Soviet Union) Valentyn Tuharin (1977–1979)
- (Soviet Union) Viktor Matviyenko (1980–1982, 1985)
- (Soviet Union) Volodymyr Troshkin (1983–84)
- (Soviet Union) Volodymyr Polishchuk (1985–1987)
- (Soviet Union) Mykola Volkov (1989)
- (Soviet Union) Roman Pokora (1989–1991)
- (Ukraine) Viktor Nosov (1991–1992)
- (Belarus) Vasiliy Kurilov (1992)
- (Ukraine) Mykhailo Dunets (1993)
- (Ukraine) Vyacheslav Kobyletskyi (1993)
- (Ukraine) Mykhaylo Fomenko (1994)
- (Ukraine) Vyacheslav Kobyletskyi (1994–95)
- (Ukraine) Orest Bal (1995)
- (Ukraine) Ivan Krasnetskyi (1995)
- (Ukraine) Volodymyr Vusatyi (1995–96)
- (Ukraine) Vyacheslav Kobyletskyi (1996–97)
- (Ukraine) Mykola Yatsyuk (1997–1999)
- (Ukraine) Serhiy Silvay (1999)
- (Ukraine) Vyacheslav Kobyletskyi (1999)
- (Ukraine) Serhiy Silvay (1999–2000)
- (Ukraine) Hryhoriy Shalamay (2000–2003)
- (Ukraine) Serhiy Silvay (2003)
- (Ukraine) Vasyl Sondey (2004)
- (Ukraine) Pavlo Ivanchov (2004–05)
- (Ukraine) Roman Laba (2005)
- (Georgia (country)) Giorgi Shengelia (2006)
- (Ukraine) Serhiy Stashko (2006)
- (Ukraine) Mykola Volkov (2006)
- (Ukraine) Serhiy Silvay (2006)
- (Ukraine) Ivan Kovanda (2007–08)
- (Ukraine) Mykola Filin (2008–09)
- (Ukraine) Andriy Kovtun (2009–10)
- (Ukraine) Mykola Filin (2015)
- (Ukraine) Oleh Lutkov (15 July 2015 – 11 November 2015)
- (Ukraine) Viktor Bohatyr (1 December 2015 – 10 April 2016)
- (Ukraine) Volodymyr Mazyar (11 April 2016 – 25 April 2017)
- (Ukraine) Yuriy Virt (25 April 2017 – 29 December 2017)
- (Belarus) Yury Svirkov (30 December 2017 – 25 April 2018)
- (Ukraine) Andriy Demchenko (caretaker) (26 April 2018 – 31 May 2018)
- (Ukraine) Volodymyr Homenyuk (14 June 2018 – 7 August 2018)
- (Ukraine) Oleh Shandruk (caretaker) (7 August 2018 – 19 September 2018)
- (Ukraine) Oleh Shandruk (20 September 2018 – 10 June 2019)
- (Ukraine) Yuriy Virt (14 June 2019 – 15 June 2023)
- (Ukraine) Serhiy Lavrynenko (15 June 2023 – 12 December 2023)
- (Ukraine) Oleh Shandruk (caretaker) (12 December 2023 – 16 December 2024)
- (Ukraine) Oleh Shandruk (17 December 2024 – present)

== League and cup history ==
=== Soviet Union ===
Season	Div.	Pos.	Pl.	W	D	L	GS	GA	P	Soviet Cup	Other		Notes
Avangard / Avanhard Rovno
1985 (Note: Season was conducted in two stages.)	3rd (Second League)	23	40	13	10	17	37	44	36				
1986	3rd (Second League)	11	40	16	9	15	46	44	41				
1987	3rd (Second League)	14	52	19	14	19	50	53	52				
1988	3rd (Second League)	14	50	21	8	21	52	56	50				
1989	3rd (Second League)	19	52	14	17	21	39	41	45				Relegated
1990	3rd (lower) (Second Lower League)	3	36	21	11	4	53	27	53		USSR	1/8 finals	
1991	3rd (lower) (Second Lower League)	4	50	28	13	9	67	38	69		USSR	Finalist	

=== Ukraine ===
Season	Div.	Pos.	Pl.	W	D	L	GS	GA	P	Ukrainian Cup	Other		Notes
Veres Rivne
1992	2nd "A" (First League)	**1**	26	14	8	4	38	15	**36**	1/32 finals			Promoted
1992–93	1st (Top League)	**16**	30	9	6	15	29	42	**24**	1/8 finals			
1993–94	1st (Top League)	**12**	34	10	12	12	32	36	**32**	1/2 finals			
1994–95	1st (Top League)	**18**	34	8	7	19	28	63	**31**	1/8 finals			Relegated
1995–96	2nd (First League)	**16**	42	15	9	18	39	49	**54**	1/32 finals			
1996–97	2nd (First League)	**23**	46	9	6	26	36	79	**42**	1/32 finals 2nd Stage			Relegated
1997–98	3rd "A" (Second League)	**4**	34	14	10	10	42	33	**52**	1/64 finals			
1998–99	3rd "A" (Second League)	**13**	28	6	3	19	13	50	**15**	1/128 finals			(Note: PFL deducted 6 points for failure to pay all license fees)
1999-00	3rd "A" (Second League)	**14**	30	7	7	16	32	51	**28**	2nd League Cup	2LC	withdrew	
2000–01	3rd "A" (Second League)	**12**	30	7	6	17	26	52	**27**	2nd League Cup	2LC	withdrew	
2001–02	3rd "A" (Second League)	**6**	36	18	10	8	41	23	**64**	1st round			
2002–03	3rd "A" (Second League)	**7**	28	11	3	14	28	39	**36**	1/32 finals			
2003–04	3rd "A" (Second League)	**10**	30	9	8	13	32	43	**35**	1/16 finals			
2004–05	3rd "A" (Second League)	**11**	28	9	6	13	35	38	**33**	1/32 finals			
2005–06	3rd "A" (Second League)	**7**	28	12	6	10	33	40	**42**	1/8 finals			
2006–07	3rd "A" (Second League)	**13**	28	5	7	16	24	44	**22**	1/32 finals			
2007–08	3rd "A" (Second League)	**14**	30	7	8	15	25	44	**29**	Did not enter			
2008–09	3rd "A" (Second League)	**13**	32	11	6	15	24	32	**39**	1/64 finals			
2009–10	3rd "A" (Second League)	**9**	20	4	4	12	16	41	**16**	1/32 finals	LC	Group stage	
2010–11	3rd "A" (Second League)	**12**	22	0	0	22	4	51	−3	1/64 finals			−3 – Expelled
2011–15	Club idle												
2015–16	3rd (Second League)	**2**	26	16	4	6	41	24	**52**	1/32 finals			Promoted
2016–17	2nd (First League)	**3**	34	20	7	7	62	32	**67**	1/8 finals			Promoted
2017–18	1st (Premier League)	**6**_{/12}	32	7	14	11	28	30	**35**	1/4 finals			Swapped with FC Lviv
2018–19	3rd "A" (Second League)	**5**_{/10}	27	12	5	10	24	22	**37**	1/64 finals			
2019–20	3rd "A" (Second League)	**3**_{/11}	20	11	3	6	34	23	**36**	1/32 finals			Promoted as play-off winner
2020–21	2nd"A" (First League)	**1**	30	21	5	4	56	21	**36**	1/4 finals			Promoted
2021–22was terminated	1st (Premier League)	**9**_{/16}	18/30	6	5	7	15	20	**23**	1/8 finals			began on 24.02.2022 Russian invasion of Ukraine
2022–23	1st (Premier League)	**13**_{/16}	30	8	7	15	35	45	**31**	Not played			Relegation play-off winner Metalurh Zaporizhzhia 0:1 6:1 (6-2)
2023–24	1st (Premier League)	**13**_{/16}	30	6	10	14	31	46	**28**	1/8 finals			Relegation play-off winner Epitsentr Kamianets-Podilskyi 1:1 3:1 (4-2)
2024–25	1st (Premier League)	**9** _{/16}	30	9	9	12	33	44	**36**	1/4 finals			
2025-26	1st (Premier League)	**11**_{/16}	30	7	10	13	26	40	**31**	1/16 finals			
2026-27	1st (Premier League)	14_{/16}	3	0	1	2	1	3	1	1/4 finals			
