= 2019–20 FC Mariupol season =

FC Mariupol
2019–20 season
- President: Tarik Makhmud Chaudri
- Manager: Oleksandr Babych
- Stadium: Volodymyr Boiko Stadium
- Ukrainian Premier League: 8th
- Ukrainian Cup: Semi-final
- UEFA Europa League: 3Q
- Top goalscorer: League: Vyacheslav Churko (5); All: Vyacheslav Churko (6)
- Highest home attendance: 8,425 (vs Shakhtar Donetsk, 1 December 2019)
- Lowest home attendance: 0 (all home matches were played behind closed doors starting 13 June 2020)
- Average home league attendance: 2,689
Home colours	Away colours

The 2019–20 season was 20th season in the top Ukrainian football league for FC Mariupol. Mariupol competed in Premier League, Ukrainian Cup and UEFA Europa League.

== Players ==
=== Squad information ===
As of 29 July 2020

Squad no.	Name	Nationality	Position	Date of birth (age)
Goalkeepers
1	Yevhen Halchuk	(Ukraine)	GK	5 March 1992 (aged 28)
33	Artem Pospyelov ^{List B}	(Ukraine)	GK	11 January 1998 (aged 22)
Defenders
2	Oleksiy Bykov ^{List B}	(Ukraine)	DF	29 March 1998 (aged 22)
4	Serhiy Chobotenko	(Ukraine)	DF	16 January 1997 (aged 23)
5	Joyskim Dawa	(Cameroon) (France)	DF	9 April 1996 (aged 24)
13	Serhiy Yavorskyi (Captain)	(Ukraine)	DF	5 July 1989 (aged 31)
20	Oleksiy Kashchuk ^{List B} (on loan from Shakhtar Donetsk)	(Ukraine)	DF	29 June 2000 (aged 20)
29	Ihor Kyryukhantsev (on loan from Shakhtar Donetsk)	(Ukraine)	DF	29 January 1996 (aged 24)
36	Kyrylo Romanyuk ^{List B}	(Ukraine)	DF	21 March 2001 (aged 19)
37	Nazariy Muravskyi ^{List B} (on loan from Shakhtar Donetsk)	(Ukraine)	DF	3 February 2000 (aged 20)
44	Danylo Sahutkin (on loan from Shakhtar Donetsk)	(Ukraine)	DF	19 April 1996 (aged 24)
75	Viktor Korniyenko ^{List B} (on loan from Shakhtar Donetsk)	(Ukraine)	DF	14 February 1999 (aged 21)
Midfielders
6	Vyacheslav Tankovskyi (on loan from Shakhtar Donetsk)	(Ukraine)	MF	16 August 1995 (aged 24)
8	Pavlo Polehenko	(Ukraine)	MF	6 January 1995 (aged 25)
9	Dmytro Myshnyov	(Ukraine)	MF	26 January 1994 (aged 26)
11	Vyacheslav Churko (on loan from Shakhtar Donetsk)	(Ukraine) (Hungary)	MF	10 May 1993 (aged 27)
14	Anton Baidal ^{List B}	(Ukraine)	MF	8 February 2000 (aged 20)
17	Serhiy Horbunov	(Ukraine)	MF	14 March 1994 (aged 26)
19	Ihor Tyschenko	(Ukraine)	MF	11 May 1989 (aged 31)
21	Danylo Lytovchenko ^{List B}	(Ukraine)	MF	21 July 2000 (aged 20)
22	Illya Putrya ^{List B}	(Ukraine)	MF	15 May 1998 (aged 22)
25	Valeriy Fedorchuk	(Ukraine)	MF	5 October 1988 (aged 31)
28	Andriy Vyskrebentsev ^{List B}	(Ukraine)	MF	27 October 2000 (aged 19)
34	Mykyta Peterman ^{List B}	(Ukraine)	MF	12 June 1999 (aged 21)
70	Vladyslav Bondar ^{List B}	(Ukraine)	MF	24 March 2000 (aged 20)
71	Maksym Chekh ^{List B} (on loan from Shakhtar Donetsk)	(Ukraine)	MF	3 January 1999 (aged 21)
73	Danylo Ihnatenko (on loan from Shakhtar Donetsk)	(Ukraine)	MF	13 March 1997 (aged 23)
97	Artem Dudik ^{List B} (on loan from Shakhtar Donetsk)	(Ukraine)	MF	2 January 1997 (aged 23)
Forwards
7	Dmytro Topalov ^{List B} (on loan from Shakhtar Donetsk)	(Ukraine)	FW	12 May 1998 (aged 22)
86	Ruslan Fomin	(Ukraine)	FW	2 March 1986 (aged 34)
77	Andriy Kulakov ^{List B} (on loan from Shakhtar Donetsk)	(Ukraine)	FW	28 April 1999 (aged 21)
90	Stanislav Biblyk ^{List B} (on loan from Shakhtar Donetsk)	(Ukraine)	FW	17 August 2001 (aged 18)

== Transfers ==
=== In ===
Date	Pos.	Player	Age	Moving from	Type	Fee	Source
Summer
22 July 2019	DF	(Ukraine) Serhiy Chobotenko	22	(Ukraine) Shakhtar Donetsk	Transfer	Undisclosed	
25 June 2019	MF	(Ukraine) Dmytro Topalov	21	(Ukraine) Shakhtar Donetsk	Loan		
27 June 2019	DF	(Ukraine) Viktor Korniyenko	20	(Ukraine) Shakhtar Donetsk	Loan		
27 June 2019	MF	(Ukraine) Maksym Chekh	20	(Ukraine) Shakhtar Donetsk	Loan		
27 June 2019	MF	(Ukraine) Oleksiy Kashchuk	19	(Ukraine) Shakhtar Donetsk	Loan		
6 August 2019	MF	(Ukraine) Vyacheslav Tankovskyi	23	(Ukraine) Shakhtar Donetsk	Loan		
20 August 2019	MF	(Ukraine) Andriy Kulakov	20	(Ukraine) Shakhtar Donetsk	Loan		
26 August 2019	FW	(Ukraine) Vladyslav Vakula	20	(Ukraine) Shakhtar Donetsk	Loan		
31 May 2019	DF	(Ukraine) Vladyslav Savin	22	(Ukraine) Avanhard Kramatorsk	Loan return		
Winter
14 January 2020	FW	(Ukraine) Artem Dudik	21	(Ukraine) Shakhtar Donetsk	Loan		
15 January 2020	DF	(Ukraine) Danylo Sahutkin	23	(Ukraine) Shakhtar Donetsk	Loan		
16 January 2020	FW	(Ukraine) Stanislav Biblyk	18	(Ukraine) Shakhtar Donetsk	Loan		
19 February 2020	MF	(Ukraine) Nazariy Muravskyi	20	(Ukraine) Shakhtar Donetsk	Loan		
19 February 2020	MF	(Ukraine) Danylo Ihnatenko	22	(Ukraine) Shakhtar Donetsk	Loan		

=== Out ===
Date	Pos.	Player	Age	Moving to	Type	Fee	Source
Summer
1 June 2019	DF	(Ukraine) Vladyslav Savin	22	(Ukraine) Avanhard Kramatorsk	Transfer	Free	
14 June 2019	DF	(Albania) Besir Demiri	24	(Slovakia) Žilina	Transfer	Free	
23 July 2019	MF	(Ukraine) Yevhen Prodanov	21	(Ukraine) Metalist 1925 Kharkiv	Transfer	Undisclosed	
1 August 2019	MF	(Ukraine) Yevheniy Bilokin	21	(Ukraine) Metalist 1925 Kharkiv	Transfer	Undisclosed	
26 August 2019	MF	(Ukraine) Vladyslav Vakula	20	(Ukraine) Shakhtar Donetsk	Transfer	Undisclosed	
1 August 2019	MF	(Ukraine) Ivan Mochevynskyi	21	(Ukraine) Polissya Zhytomyr	Loan		
1 June 2019	GK	(Ukraine) Yevhen Hrytsenko	24	(Ukraine) Shakhtar Donetsk	Loan return		
1 June 2019	DF	(Ukraine) Serhiy Chobotenko	22	(Ukraine) Shakhtar Donetsk	Loan return		
1 June 2019	MF	(Ukraine) Danylo Ihnatenko	22	(Ukraine) Shakhtar Donetsk	Loan return		
1 June 2019	MF	(Ukraine) Andriy Korobenko	22	(Ukraine) Shakhtar Donetsk	Loan return		
1 June 2019	MF	(Ukraine) Oleksandr Pikhalyonok	22	(Ukraine) Shakhtar Donetsk	Loan return		
1 June 2019	MF	(Ukraine) Oleksandr Zubkov	22	(Ukraine) Shakhtar Donetsk	Loan return		
1 June 2019	FW	(Ukraine) Andriy Boryachuk	23	(Ukraine) Shakhtar Donetsk	Loan return		
1 June 2019	FW	(Ukraine) Vladyslav Buhay	21	(Ukraine) Shakhtar Donetsk	Loan return		
1 June 2019	FW	(Ukraine) Danylo Sikan	18	(Ukraine) Shakhtar Donetsk	Loan return		
Winter
1 April 2020	GK	(Ukraine) Rustam Khudzhamov	37	Retired	Transfer	Free	
1 January 2020	MF	(Ukraine) Vladyslav Vakula	20	(Ukraine) Shakhtar Donetsk	Loan return		

== Pre-season and friendlies ==
29 June 2019 Friendly	FC Mariupol (Ukraine)	2–0	(Armenia) Banants Yerevan	Kartepe, Turkey
17:30 EEST (UTC+03:00)	Tyschenko 50', 60'	Report		Stadium: Green Park hotel

2 July 2019 Friendly	FC Mariupol (Ukraine)	2–2	(North Macedonia) Shkupi	Hendek, Turkey
17:30 EEST (UTC+03:00)	Yavorskyi 3'; Chekh 39'	Report	Jusufi 18'; Ilieski 59'

7 July 2019 Friendly	FC Mariupol (Ukraine)	6–0	(Turkey) Darıca Gençlerbirliği	Kartepe, Turkey
11:00 EEST (UTC+03:00)	Churko 14'; Putrya 36' (pen.); Bilokin 56'; Prodanov 75'; Peterman 84'; Mochevinskyi 89'	Report		Stadium: Green Park hotel

7 July 2019 Friendly	FC Mariupol (Ukraine)	1–2	(Azerbaijan) Gabala	Hendek, Turkey
17:30 EEST (UTC+03:00)	Fomin 34' (pen.)	Report	Iskandarov 3'; Huseynov 15'

10 July 2019 Friendly	FC Mariupol (Ukraine)	2–1	(Turkey) Darıca Gençlerbirliği	Kartepe, Turkey
11:00 EEST (UTC+03:00)	Kashchuk 14'; 54' (o.g.)	Report	Iskandarov 40'	Stadium: Green Park hotel

10 July 2019 Friendly	FC Mariupol (Ukraine)	Cancelled	(Cameroon) FC Colombe	Kartepe, Turkey
17:00 EEST (UTC+03:00)		Report		Stadium: Green Park hotel

18 July 2019 Friendly	Zorya Luhansk (Ukraine)	3–1	(Ukraine) FC Mariupol	Zaporizhia
17:30 EEST (UTC+03:00)	Mykhaylychenko 10'; Vernydub 52'; Budkivskyi 73'	Report	Churko 58'	Stadium: Torpedo Stadium

7 September 2020 Friendly	SC Dnipro-1 (Ukraine)	2–3	(Ukraine) FC Mariupol	Dnipro
18:00 EEST (UTC+03:00)	Kulish 35' (pen.); Polehenko 75' (o.g.)	Report	Shapoval 11' (o.g.); Churko 67'; Baidal 85'	Stadium: Dnipro training facility

12 October 2019 Friendly	Zorya Luhansk (Ukraine)	3–1	(Ukraine) FC Mariupol	Zaporizhia
15:00 EEST (UTC+03:00)	Kocherhin 57'; Lunyov 67'; Yurchenko 75'	Report	Vakula 37'	Stadium: Torpedo Stadium

20 January 2020 Friendly	FC Mariupol (Ukraine)	1–1	(Kazakhstan) Kyzylzhar	Side, Turkey
16:00 EEST (UTC+03:00)	Baidal 37'	Report	39'	Stadium: Starlight

24 January 2020 Friendly	Dynamo Brest (Belarus)	2–2	(Ukraine) FC Mariupol	Belek, Turkey
16:00 EEST (UTC+03:00)	Milevskyi 41'; Krivets 49'	Report	Kulakov 21'; Biblyk 67'	Stadium: Caliste

28 January 2020 Friendly	FC Mariupol (Ukraine)	1–1	(Austria) SKN St. Pölten	Side, Turkey
10:00 EEST (UTC+03:00)	Fomin 58' (pen.)	Report	Pak Kwang-ryong 90' (pen.)	Stadium: Starlight

6 February 2020 Friendly	FC Mariupol (Ukraine)	3–2	(Austria) SV Stripfing	Side, Turkey
10:00 EEST (UTC+03:00)	Churko 55' (pen.); Kulakov 80'; Topalov 90'	Report	Sulimani 30'; Heinicker 49'	Stadium: Starlight

6 February 2020 Friendly	FC Mariupol (Ukraine)	3–0	(Bulgaria) Slavia Sofia	Side, Turkey
16:00 EEST (UTC+03:00)	Horbunov 22'; Fomin 73'; Tankovskyi 86'	Report		Stadium: Starlight

10 February 2020 Friendly	FC Mariupol (Ukraine)	1–1	(Ukraine) FC Lviv	Side, Turkey
10:00 EEST (UTC+03:00)	Churko 60' (pen.)	Report	Renan 44'	Stadium: Starlight

10 February 2020 Friendly	FC Mariupol (Ukraine)	2–1	(Ukraine) Chornomorets Odesa	Side, Turkey
16:00 EEST (UTC+03:00)	Chobotenko 24'; Horbunov 84'	Report	Norenkov 76'	Stadium: Starlight

13 February 2020 Friendly	FC Mariupol (Ukraine)	9–0	(Latvia) Valmieras FK	Side, Turkey
10:00 EEST (UTC+03:00)	Myshnyov 24', 84'; Fedorchuk 30' (pen.); Topalov 50', 82', 87'; Biblyk 65', 76'; Polehenko 79'	Report		Stadium: Starlight

13 February 2020 Friendly	FC Mariupol (Ukraine)	1–2	(Georgia (country)) Locomotive Tbilisi	Side, Turkey
16:00 EEST (UTC+03:00)	Ihnatenko 2'	Report	Sikharulidze 14', 27'	Stadium: Starlight

== Competitions ==
=== Overall ===
Competition	First match	Last match	Starting round	Final position	Record							
Competition	First match	Last match	Starting round	Final position	Pld	W	D	L	GF	GA	GD	Win %
Ukrainian Premier League	30 July 2019	29 July 2020	Matchday 1	8th	34	13	9	12	42	48	−6	38.24
Ukrainian Cup	2 October 2019	24 June 2020	Third Preliminary round (1/16)	Semi-final	4	3	1	0	7	3	+4	75.00
UEFA Europa League	8 August 2019	18 August 2019	3Q	3Q	2	0	1	1	0	4	−4	0.00
Total					40	16	11	13	49	55	−6	40.00

Last updated: 29 July 2020
Source: Competitions

=== Premier League ===
==== League table ====
Pos	Team	Pld	W	D	L	GF	GA	GD	Pts	Qualification or relegation
7	SC Dnipro-1	32	15	4	13	42	42	0	49	Qualification for the playoff for Europa League second qualifying round
8	FC Mariupol	32	12	9	11	40	46	−6	45	Qualification for the playoff for Europa League second qualifying round
9	Olimpik Donetsk	32	10	6	16	32	47	−15	36	
10	Vorskla Poltava	32	9	7	16	23	48	−25	34	
11	FC Lviv	32	5	9	18	25	57	−32	24	

Source: Ukrainian Premier League, UEFA, Soccerway
Rules for classification: 1) Points; 2) Head-to-head points; 3) Head-to-head goal difference; 4) Head-to-head higher number of goals scored; 5) Goal difference; 6) Higher number of goals scored; 7) Draw or "golden match" if tied for title (Article 22, paragraph 3).

==== Results summary ====
Overall								Home						Away					
Pld	W	D	L	GF	GA	GD	Pts	W	D	L	GF	GA	GD	W	D	L	GF	GA	GD
34	13	9	12	42	48	−6	48	7	5	4	23	18	+5	6	4	8	19	30	−11

Last updated: 29 July 2020.
Source: Competitive matches

==== Results by round ====
Round	1	2	3	4	5	6	7	8	9	10	11	12	13	14	15	16	17	18	19	20	21	22	23	24	25	26	27	28	29	30	31	32
Ground	A	H	A	H	A	A	H	A	H	A	H	H	A	H	A	H	H	A	H	A	H	A	A	A	A	H	H	H	H	H	A	A
Result	L	W	D	4	L	W	D	D	L	D	W	W	L	D	L	D	D	W	L	L	W	L	L	W	D	D	W	W	W	L	W	W
Position	8	7	7	7	10	9	7	8	8	8	7	6	6	6	7	6	7	6	7	7	7	8	8	8	8	8	8	8	8	8	8	8

Updated to match(es) played on 19 July 2020. Source: Competitive matches
A = Away; H = Home; W = Win; D = Draw; L = Loss

==== Matches ====
30 July 2019 1	Kolos Kovalivka	2–1	FC Mariupol	Kyiv
19:00 EEST (UTC+03:00)	Smyrnyi 41'; Maksymenko (yellow card) 56' (yellow-red card) 84'; Havrysh 67'; Ilyin (yellow card) 70'	Report	Vakula (yellow card) 12'; Fomin 15', (yellow card) 90+3'; Putrya (yellow card) 64'; Yavorskyi (yellow card) 65'	Stadium: Obolon Arena; Attendance: 2,993; Referee: Oleksandr Derdo

3 August 2019 2	FC Mariupol	2–1	FC Oleksandriya	Mariupol
19:00 EEST (UTC+03:00)	Vakula (yellow card) 19', (goal) 83'; Fomin 77' (pen.)	Report	Miroshnichenko (yellow card) 11'; Babohlo (yellow card) 45'; Bezborodko (yellow card) 56'; Kovalets (yellow card) 79'; Sitalo 90+5'	Stadium: Volodymyr Boiko Stadium; Attendance: 3,173; Referee: Yuriy Mozharovskyi

11 August 2019 3	Karpaty Lviv	1–1	FC Mariupol	Lviv
19:30 EEST (UTC+03:00)	Vojković 30'; Klyots (yellow card) 46' (yellow-red card) 67'; Hutsulyak (yellow card) 66'; Di Franco (yellow card) 77'	Report	Topalov 25'; Yavorskyi (yellow card) 57'; Fedorchuk (yellow card) 79'	Stadium: Ukraina Stadium; Attendance: 3,197; Referee: Kostiantyn Trukhanov

25 August 2019 5	Shakhtar Donetsk	5–1	FC Mariupol	Kharkiv
19:30 EEST (UTC+03:00)	Tetê 8', 11'; Moraes 12'; Taison 62' (pen.); Marcos Antônio 83'	Report	Vakula 78'	Stadium: OSC Metalist; Attendance: 7,134; Referee: Dmytro Kutakov

31 August 2019 6	FC Lviv	0–1	FC Mariupol	Lviv
19:30 EEST (UTC+03:00)	Pryimak (yellow card) 25'; Renan (yellow card) 68'; Honchar (yellow card) 77'; Zubkov (yellow card) 90+1'; Kvasnyi (yellow card) 90+4'	Report	Vakula 61'; Myshnyov (yellow card) 84'; Kyryukhantsev (yellow card) 86'	Stadium: Ukraina Stadium; Attendance: 943; Referee: Anatoliy Abdula

15 September 2019 7	FC Mariupol	1–1	Olimpik Donetsk	Mariupol
14:00 EEST (UTC+03:00)	Topalov (yellow card) 20'; Kyryukhantsev 43'; Bykov (yellow card) 62'; Yavorskyi (yellow card) 81'; Vakula (yellow card) 90+1'	Report	Imeri 58'; Lukyanchuk (yellow card) 75'; Tsymbalyuk (yellow card) 90+1'; Ksyonz (yellow card) 90+1'	Stadium: Volodymyr Boiko Stadium; Attendance: 3,482; Referee: Oleksandr Derdo

21 September 2019 8	Zorya Luhansk	0–0	FC Mariupol	Zaporizhia
17:00 EEST (UTC+03:00)	Budkivskyi (yellow card) 6' (yellow-red card) 39'; Tymchyk (yellow card) 48'; Mykhaylychenko (yellow card) 75'; Ivanisenya (yellow card) 90'	Report	Fedorchuk (yellow card) 27' (yellow-red card) 31'; Bykov (yellow card) 90+2'	Stadium: Slavutych-Arena; Attendance: 1,875; Referee: Mykola Balakin

25 September 2019 4	FC Mariupol	0–1	Dynamo Kyiv	Mariupol
17:00 EEST (UTC+03:00)	Tyschenko (yellow card) 33'; Bykov (yellow card) 43'; Chekh (yellow card) 70'; Putrya (yellow card) 88'	Report	Verbič 90+2', (yellow card) 90+3'	Stadium: Volodymyr Boiko Stadium; Attendance: 8,196; Referee: Dmytro Bondarenko

29 September 2019 9	FC Mariupol	0–4	Desna Chernihiv	Mariupol
14:00 EEST (UTC+03:00)		Report	Khlyobas 20', 67'; Filippov 21', 81'	Stadium: Volodymyr Boiko Stadium; Attendance: 4,072; Referee: Yaroslav Kozyk

5 October 2019 10	Vorskla Poltava	1–1	FC Mariupol	Poltava
14:00 EEST (UTC+03:00)	Petrović (yellow card) 24'; Sapay (yellow card) 37'; Perduta (yellow card) 64'; Vasin 90+2'	Report	Vakula (yellow card) 10'; Yavorskyi (yellow card) 30'; Tankovskyi (yellow card) 45+1'; Fedorchuk (yellow card) 53'; Bykov (yellow card) 55'; Chobotenko 57'	Stadium: Vorskla Stadium; Attendance: 2,100; Referee: Maksym Kozyryatskyi

20 October 2019 11	FC Mariupol	1–0	SC Dnipro-1	Mariupol
14:00 EEST (UTC+03:00)	Chobotenko (yellow card) 45+1'; Kyryukhantsev (yellow card) 48'; Fedorchuk 82'; Tyschenko (yellow card) 89'	Report	Snizhko (yellow card) 29'	Stadium: Volodymyr Boiko Stadium; Attendance: 3,214; Referee: Serhiy Boyko

26 October 2019 12	FC Mariupol	2–0	Kolos Kovalivka	Mariupol
14:00 EEST (UTC+03:00)	Kyryukhantsev 39'; Topalov 86'	Report	Orikhovskyi (yellow card) 58'; Maksymenko (yellow card) 78' (yellow-red card) 90'	Stadium: Volodymyr Boiko Stadium; Attendance: 3,150; Referee: Yuriy Mozharovskyi

3 November 2019 13	FC Oleksandriya	3–1	FC Mariupol	Oleksandriya
14:00 EET (UTC+02:00)	Babohlo (yellow card) 38'; Bezborodko 55'; Kovalets 57'; Korniyenko 69' (o.g.)	Report	Bykov (yellow card) 28' (yellow-red card) 32'; Dawa (yellow card) 43'; Vakula (yellow card) 49'; Churko 71'; Chobotenko (yellow card) 78'	Stadium: CSC Nika Stadium; Attendance: 935; Referee: Dmytro Bondarenko

9 November 2019 14	FC Mariupol	2–2	Karpaty Lviv	Mariupol
14:00 EET (UTC+02:00)	Churko 15', (yellow card) 41'; Dawa (yellow card) 51'; Myshnyov 54', (yellow card) 61'; Chekh (yellow card) 80'; Yavorskyi (yellow card) 90+3'	Report	Veremiyenko (yellow card) 14'; Nazaryna (yellow card) 29', (goal) 58', 90+3' (pen.); Di Franco (yellow card) 35'; Hall (yellow card) 45+3'; Vojković (yellow card) 79'	Stadium: Volodymyr Boiko Stadium; Attendance: 4,077; Referee: Yevhen Aranovskyi

24 November 2019 15	Dynamo Kyiv	3–0	FC Mariupol	Kyiv
17:00 EET (UTC+02:00)	Buyalskyi 21'; Besyedin (yellow card) 38'; Tsyhankov 78'; Verbič 81'	Report	Tyschenko (yellow card) 18'; Dawa (yellow card) 61'	Stadium: NSC Olimpiyskiy; Attendance: 6,792; Referee: Ihor Paskhal

1 December 2019 16	FC Mariupol	1–1	Shakhtar Donetsk	Mariupol
14:00 EET (UTC+02:00)	Polehenko (yellow card) 14'; Dawa (yellow card) 18'; Putrya 49'; Peterman (yellow card) 78'	Report	Taison 15' (pen.); Ismaily (yellow card) 31'; Marcos Antônio (yellow card) 59'; Khocholava (yellow card) 71'	Stadium: Volodymyr Boiko Stadium; Attendance: 8,425; Referee: Anatoliy Abdula

8 December 2019 17	FC Mariupol	0–0	FC Lviv	Mariupol
14:00 EET (UTC+02:00)	Tankovskyi (red card) 65'; Tyschenko (yellow card) 68'; Horbunov (yellow card) 74'; Vakula (yellow card) 88'	Report	China (yellow card) 19'; Bratkov (red card) 48'; Alvaro (yellow card) 62'; Rafael Sabino (yellow card) 86'	Stadium: Volodymyr Boiko Stadium; Attendance: 2,987; Referee: Serhiy Boyko

14 December 2019 18	Olimpik Donetsk	1–2	FC Mariupol	Kyiv
19:30 EET (UTC+02:00)	Zahedi 49'; Krynskyi (yellow card) 52'; Klymenchuk (yellow card) 69'	Report	Fedorchuk (yellow card) 3'; Yavorskyi (yellow card) 12'; Churko 53' (pen.), (yellow card) 78'; Lukyanchuk 89' (o.g.); Chekh (yellow card) 89'	Stadium: Dynamo Stadium; Attendance: 254; Referee: Oleksandr Omelchenko

22 February 2020 19	FC Mariupol	1–2	Zorya Luhansk	Mariupol
14:00 EET (UTC+02:00)	Chekh (yellow card) 44'; Polehenko (yellow card) 59'; Ihnatenko (yellow card) 66'; Myshnyov 69'; Bykov (yellow card) 88'	Report	Cheberko (yellow card) 5'; Yurchenko (yellow card) 28'; Perović (yellow card) 41', (goal) 62'; Lyednyev (yellow card) 45', (goal) 67'; Tymchyk (yellow card) 86'; Vernydub (yellow card) 88'	Stadium: Volodymyr Boiko Stadium; Attendance: 1,570; Referee: Yaroslav Kozyk

29 February 2020 20	Desna Chernihiv	4–0	FC Mariupol	Chernihiv
14:00 EET (UTC+02:00)	Totovytskyi 11', 20'; Filippov 58' (pen.); Kalitvintsev 90+2'	Report	Chobotenko (yellow card) 5'; Dawa (yellow card) 20'; Ihnatenko (yellow card) 52'; Muravskyi (yellow card) 57'	Stadium: Chernihiv Stadium; Attendance: 3,417; Referee: Andriy Kovalenko

4 March 2020 21	FC Mariupol	3–0	Vorskla Poltava	Mariupol
14:00 EET (UTC+02:00)	Myshnyov 32' (pen.), (yellow card) 35'; Topalov 47'; Muravskyi (yellow card) 77' (yellow-red card) 90+3'; Chobotenko 80'; Ihnatenko (yellow card) 84'	Report	Ndiaye (yellow card) 54'; Vasin (yellow card) 70'; Kane (yellow card) 76'	Stadium: Volodymyr Boiko Stadium; Attendance: 689; Referee: Oleksandr Derdo

8 March 2020 22	SC Dnipro-1	3–0	FC Mariupol	Dnipro
17:00 EET (UTC+02:00)	Chychykov 68', 88'; Kravchenko (yellow card) 77'; Buletsa 81'	Report	Ihnatenko (yellow card) 23' (yellow-red card) 77'; Chobotenko (red card) 23'; Yavorskyi (yellow card) 36' (yellow-red card) 39'; Myshnyov (yellow card) 77'	Stadium: Dnipro-Arena; Attendance: 3,125; Referee: Yevhen Aranovskyi

14 March 2020 23	SC Dnipro-1	2–0	FC Mariupol	Dnipro
17:00 EET (UTC+02:00)	Khoblenko (yellow card) 53', (goal) 64' (pen.); Supriaha (yellow card) 89'	Report	Dawa (yellow card) 26'; Kulakov (yellow card) 74'; Bykov (yellow card) 83'	Stadium: Dnipro-Arena; Attendance: 0 Referee: Kateryna Monzul
Note: Match was played behind closed doors due to quarantine in Ukraine during COVID-19 pandemic

7 June 2020 25	Olimpik Donetsk	2–2	FC Mariupol	Kyiv
14:00 EEST (UTC+03:00)	Zotko (yellow card) 12'; Balashov 16'; Zahedi (yellow card) 21'; Kravchuk 83'	Report	Chobotenko 35', (yellow card) 87'; Fedorchuk (yellow card) 42'; Kashchuk 85'	Stadium: Dynamo Stadium; Attendance: 0 Referee: Oleksandr Derdo
Note: Match was played behind closed doors due to quarantine in Ukraine during COVID-19 pandemic

13 June 2020 26	FC Mariupol	1–1	Vorskla Poltava	Mariupol
14:00 EEST (UTC+03:00)	Bykov (yellow card) 14'; Ihnatenko (yellow card) 23'; Topalov 74'	Report	Puclin (yellow card) 27'; Yakubu 59'; Sapay (yellow card) 90+4'; Perduta (red card) 90+5'	Stadium: Volodymyr Boiko Stadium; Attendance: 0 Referee: Dmytro Kutakov
Note: Match was played behind closed doors due to quarantine in Ukraine during COVID-19 pandemic

19 June 2020 27	FC Mariupol	3–0	FC Lviv	Mariupol
17:00 EEST (UTC+03:00)	Fedorchuk (yellow card) 2'; Fomin 5', 27'; Chobotenko (yellow card) 51'; Yavorskyi (yellow card) 63'; Polehenko (yellow card) 69'; Kashchuk (yellow card) 88', (goal) 90+2'	Report	Nych (yellow card) 21'; Bratkov (yellow card) 42'; Bopesu (yellow card) 45'; Pryimak (yellow card) 85'; Kravchuk (yellow card) 90+3'	Stadium: Volodymyr Boiko Stadium; Attendance: 0 Referee: Kostiantyn Trukhanov
Note: Match was played behind closed doors due to quarantine in Ukraine during COVID-19 pandemic

28 June 2020 28	FC Mariupol	2–1	SC Dnipro-1	Mariupol
17:00 EEST (UTC+03:00)	Korniyenko 24'; Ihnatenko (yellow card) 37'; Kashchuk 45+3'; Muravskyi (yellow card) 48' (yellow-red card) 67'; Kulakov (yellow card) 58'	Report	Lohinov (yellow card) 45'; Svatok (yellow card) 58'; Khoblenko 67' (pen.); Di Franco (yellow card) 81'	Stadium: Volodymyr Boiko Stadium; Attendance: 0 Referee: Anatoliy Abdula
Note: Match was played behind closed doors due to quarantine in Ukraine during COVID-19 pandemic

1 July 2020 24	Karpaty Lviv	0–3	FC Mariupol	Mariupol
19:00 EET (UTC+02:00)		Report		Stadium: Volodymyr Boiko Stadium
Note: Technical victory

4 July 2020 29	FC Mariupol	3–0	Karpaty Lviv	Mariupol
17:00 EEST (UTC+03:00)		Report		Stadium: Volodymyr Boiko Stadium
Note: Technical victory

12 July 2020 30	FC Mariupol	1–4	Olimpik Donetsk	Mariupol
17:00 EEST (UTC+03:00)	Myshnyov 66'	Report	Zaviyskyi 8', 30'; Dehtyarov 14', 55'; Lytvyn (yellow card) 85'	Stadium: Volodymyr Boiko Stadium; Attendance: 0 Referee: Volodymyr Novokhatniy
Note: Match was played behind closed doors due to quarantine in Ukraine during COVID-19 pandemic.

16 July 2020 31	Vorskla Poltava	1–2	FC Mariupol	Poltava
17:00 EEST (UTC+03:00)	Pavliyk 46'; Chelyadin (yellow card) 66' (yellow-red card) 90+1'	Report	Ihnatenko (yellow card) 40' (red card) 51'; Churko 56' (pen.); Kulakov (yellow card) 58'; Myshnyov (yellow card) 66'; Bykov (yellow card) 68'; Kyryukhantsev 86'	Stadium: Vorskla Stadium; Attendance: 0 Referee: Denys Shurman
Note: Match was played behind closed doors due to quarantine in Ukraine during COVID-19 pandemic.

19 July 2020 32	FC Lviv	0–2	FC Mariupol	Lviv
17:00 EEST (UTC+03:00)	Komarets (yellow card) 31'; Rafael Sabino (yellow card) 57'	Report	Chekh 32'; Kulakov (yellow card) 39'; Churko 59' (pen.)	Stadium: Ukraina Stadium; Attendance: 0 Referee: Oleksandr Derdo
Note: Match was played behind closed doors due to quarantine in Ukraine during COVID-19 pandemic.

==== Play-off round ====
25 July 2020 Play-off	FC Oleksandriya	1–2	FC Mariupol	Oleksandriya
19:30 EEST (UTC+03:00)	Bezborodko 35'	Report	Polehenko 28'; Fomin (yellow card) 69'; Kashchuk 83'; Halchuk (yellow card) 90+2'	Stadium: CSC Nika Stadium; Attendance: 1,070; Referee: Anatoliy Abdula

29 July 2020 Play-off final	Kolos Kovalivka	1–0	FC Mariupol	Kyiv
19:30 EEST (UTC+03:00)	Zadoya (yellow card) 11'; Bondarenko (yellow card) 74'; Antyukh 95'; Kostyshyn (yellow card) 113'	Report	Myshnyov (yellow card) 7'; Tyschenko (yellow card) 46'; Chobotenko (yellow card) 68'; Ihnatenko (yellow card) 84'; Chekh (yellow card) 101'	Stadium: NSC Olimpiyskiy; Attendance: 5,073; Referee: Yevhen Aranovskyi

=== Ukrainian Cup ===
2 October 2019 3rd preliminary round	Rukh Lviv	0–1	FC Mariupol	Lviv
18:00 EEST (UTC+03:00)	Nykytyuk (yellow card) 19'; Kondrakov (yellow card) 44'; Marushka (yellow card) 54'; Martynyuk (yellow card) 61'; Antwi (red card) 78'	Report	Fedorchuk (yellow card) 45'; Peterman (yellow card) 50'; Dawa (yellow card) 68'; Horbunov 76'	Stadium: Skif Stadium; Attendance: 4,000; Referee: Dmytro Kryvushkin

30 October 2019 Round of 16 (1/8)	FC Mariupol	1–0	Olimpik Donetsk	Mariupol
14:00 EEST (UTC+03:00)	Bykov (yellow card) 42'; Yavorskyi (yellow card) 53'; Churko 90+3'	Report	Kravchuk (yellow card) 51'; Zaviyskyi (yellow card) 62'	Stadium: Volodymyr Boiko Stadium; Attendance: 1,917; Referee: Yuriy Ivanov

11 March 2020 Quarterfinal	Alians Lypova Dolyna	2–4	FC Mariupol	Sumy
18:00 EEST (UTC+03:00)	Osadchiyi 24'; Rohozynskyi (yellow card) 34'; Yaroshenko 45+1'; Vladyslav Sharay (yellow card) 66'; Prykhodko (yellow card) 82'	Report	Fomin (yellow card) 7'; Kulakov 30'; Ihnatenko (yellow card) 32'; Myshnyov (yellow card) 33'; Yavorskyi 36'; Zahynaylov 47' (o.g.); Fedorchuk (yellow card) 56' (yellow-red card) 86'; Muravskyi 66'; Tyschenko (yellow card) 84'	Stadium: Yuvileiny Stadium; Attendance: 6,500; Referee: Ihor Paskhal

24 June 2020 Semifinal	FC Mariupol	1–1 (2 – 3 p)	Vorskla Poltava	Mariupol
19:30 EEST (UTC+03:00)	Topalov (yellow card) 32'; Horbunov 37'; Tyschenko (yellow card) 84'; Bykov (yellow card) 114'	Report	Sklyar (yellow card) 70'; Kane 80' (pen.); Puclin (yellow card) 81'; Chesnakov (yellow card) 87'	Stadium: Volodymyr Boiko Stadium; Attendance: 0 Referee: Kateryna Monzul
	Penalties
	Kulakov (penalty missed); Kashchuk (penalty scored); Polehenko (penalty scored); Ihnatenko (penalty missed); Korniyenko (penalty missed)		Puclin (penalty scored); Šehić (penalty missed); Kane (penalty scored); Sklyar (penalty scored); Bayenko (penalty missed)

=== UEFA Europa League ===
8 August 2019 3Q	FC Mariupol (Ukraine)	0–0	(Netherlands) AZ Alkmaar	Odesa
20:00 EEST (UTC+03:00)	Chekh (yellow card) 26'; Polehenko (yellow card) 90+3'	Report	Svensson (yellow card) 25'; Boadu (yellow card) 60'	Stadium: Chornomorets Stadium; Attendance: 4,426; Referee: Michael Tykgaard

15 August 2019 3Q	AZ Alkmaar (Netherlands)	4–0	(Ukraine) FC Mariupol	The Hague, Netherlands
21:30 EEST (UTC+03:00)	Idrissi (yellow card) 18'; Stengs 20'; Svensson (yellow card) 40'; Ouwejan 44'; Wuytens 62'; Midtsjø (yellow card) 87'; Yavorskyi 90' (o.g.)	Report	Myshnyov (yellow card) 68'	Stadium: Cars Jeans Stadion; Attendance: 8,018; Referee: Bartosz Frankowski

== Statistics ==
=== Appearances and goals ===
No.	Pos	Nat	Player	Total		Premier League		Cup		EL	
No.	Pos	Nat	Player	Apps	Goals	Apps	Goals	Apps	Goals	Apps	Goals
Goalkeepers
1	GK	(Ukraine) UKR	Yevhen Halchuk	29	0	25	0	4	0	0	0
33	GK	(Ukraine) UKR	Artem Pospyelov	1	0	1	0	0	0	0	0
Defenders
2	DF	(Ukraine) UKR	Oleksiy Bykov	22	0	18	0	1+1	0	2	0
4	DF	(Ukraine) UKR	Serhiy Chobotenko	30	3	26+1	3	1	0	2	0
5	DF	(Cameroon) CMR	Joyskim Dawa	25	0	15+6	0	2+1	0	0+1	0
13	DF	(Ukraine) UKR	Serhiy Yavorskyi	27	1	20+2	0	4	1	1	0
20	DF	(Ukraine) UKR	Oleksiy Kashchuk	20	4	5+12	4	1+1	0	0+1	0
29	DF	(Ukraine) UKR	Ihor Kyryukhantsev	25	3	20+3	3	0	0	1+1	0
36	DF	(Ukraine) UKR	Kyrylo Romanyuk	1	0	0+1	0	0	0	0	0
37	DF	(Ukraine) UKR	Nazariy Muravskyi	9	1	6+2	0	1	1	0	0
44	DF	(Ukraine) UKR	Danylo Sahutkin	3	0	1+2	0	0	0	0	0
75	DF	(Ukraine) UKR	Viktor Korniyenko	21	1	14+3	1	3	0	0+1	0
Midfielders
6	MF	(Ukraine) UKR	Vyacheslav Tankovskyi	13	0	7+2	0	0+2	0	1+1	0
8	MF	(Ukraine) UKR	Pavlo Polehenko	22	1	12+5	1	3	0	2	0
9	MF	(Ukraine) UKR	Dmytro Myshnyov	36	4	29+1	4	4	0	2	0
11	MF	(Ukraine) UKR	Vyacheslav Churko	32	6	23+4	5	1+2	1	2	0
14	MF	(Ukraine) UKR	Anton Baidal	2	0	0+2	0	0	0	0	0
17	MF	(Ukraine) UKR	Serhiy Horbunov	23	2	15+5	0	2	2	1	0
19	MF	(Ukraine) UKR	Ihor Tyschenko	24	0	9+10	0	3+1	0	1	0
22	MF	(Ukraine) UKR	Illya Putrya	10	1	2+6	1	1+1	0	0	0
25	MF	(Ukraine) UKR	Valeriy Fedorchuk	32	1	26+1	1	2+1	0	2	0
28	MF	(Ukraine) UKR	Andriy Vyskrebentsev	1	0	0+1	0	0	0	0	0
34	MF	(Ukraine) UKR	Mykyta Peterman	6	0	2+3	0	1	0	0	0
70	MF	(Ukraine) UKR	Vladyslav Bondar	1	0	0+1	0	0	0	0	0
71	MF	(Ukraine) UKR	Maksym Chekh	24	1	14+7	1	2	0	1	0
73	MF	(Ukraine) UKR	Danylo Ihnatenko	13	0	9+2	0	2	0	0	0
97	MF	(Ukraine) UKR	Artem Dudik	2	0	0+1	0	0+1	0	0	0
Forwards
7	FW	(Ukraine) UKR	Dmytro Topalov	31	5	14+13	5	2+1	0	0+1	0
77	FW	(Ukraine) UKR	Andriy Kulakov	15	1	8+5	0	1+1	1	0	0
86	FW	(Ukraine) UKR	Ruslan Fomin	15	4	9+4	4	2	0	0	0
Players transferred out during the season
12	GK	(Ukraine) UKR	Rustam Khudzhamov	8	0	6	0	0	0	2	0
99	FW	(Ukraine) UKR	Vladyslav Vakula	19	3	15	3	1+1	0	2	0

Source: Competitions

Last updated: 29 July 2020

=== Goalscorers ===
Rank	No.	Pos	Nat	Name	Premier League	Cup	Europa League	Total
1	11	MF	(Ukraine)	Vyacheslav Churko	5	1	0	6
2	7	FW	(Ukraine)	Dmytro Topalov	4	0	0	4
2	9	MF	(Ukraine)	Dmytro Myshnyov	4	0	0	4
2	20	DF	(Ukraine)	Oleksiy Kashchuk	4	0	0	4
2	86	FW	(Ukraine)	Ruslan Fomin	4	0	0	4
6	4	DF	(Ukraine)	Serhiy Chobotenko	3	0	0	3
6	29	DF	(Ukraine)	Ihor Kyryukhantsev	3	0	0	3
6	99	FW	(Ukraine)	Vladyslav Vakula	3	0	0	3
9	17	MF	(Ukraine)	Serhiy Horbunov	0	2	0	2
10	8	MF	(Ukraine)	Pavlo Polehenko	1	0	0	1
10	13	DF	(Ukraine)	Serhiy Yavorskyi	0	1	0	1
10	22	MF	(Ukraine)	Illya Putrya	1	0	0	1
10	25	MF	(Ukraine)	Valeriy Fedorchuk	1	0	0	1
10	37	DF	(Ukraine)	Nazariy Muravskyi	0	1	0	1
10	71	MF	(Ukraine)	Maksym Chekh	1	0	0	1
10	77	FW	(Ukraine)	Andriy Kulakov	0	1	0	1
10	75	DF	(Ukraine)	Viktor Korniyenko	1	0	0	1
				Own goal	1	1	0	2
				Technical victory	6	0	0	6
				Total	42	7	0	49

Last updated: 29 July 2020

=== Clean sheets ===
Rank	No.	Pos	Nat	Name	Premier League	Cup	Europa League	Total
1	1	GK	(Ukraine)	Yevhen Halchuk	5	2	0	7
2	12	GK	(Ukraine)	Rustam Khudzhamov	2	0	1	3
3	33	GK	(Ukraine)	Artem Pospyelov	1	0	0	1
				Total	8	2	1	11

Last updated: 29 July 2020

=== Disciplinary record ===
No.	Pos	Nat	Player	Premier League			Cup			Europa League			Total		
No.	Pos	Nat	Player	Booked	(yellow card) (yellow-red card)	Sent off (straight red)	Booked	(yellow card) (yellow-red card)	Sent off (straight red)	Booked	(yellow card) (yellow-red card)	Sent off (straight red)	Booked	(yellow card) (yellow-red card)	Sent off (straight red)
1	GK	(Ukraine)	Serhiy Chobotenko	1	0	0	0	0	0	0	0	0	1	0	0
2	DF	(Ukraine)	Oleksiy Bykov	8	1	0	2	0	0	0	0	0	10	1	0
4	DF	(Ukraine)	Serhiy Chobotenko	6	0	1	0	0	0	0	0	0	6	0	1
5	DF	(Cameroon)	Joyskim Dawa	6	0	0	1	0	0	0	0	0	7	0	0
6	MF	(Ukraine)	Vyacheslav Tankovskyi	1	0	1	0	0	0	1	0	0	0	0	1
7	DF	(Ukraine)	Dmytro Topalov	1	0	0	1	0	0	0	0	0	2	0	0
8	MF	(Ukraine)	Pavlo Polehenko	3	0	0	0	0	0	1	0	0	4	0	0
9	MF	(Ukraine)	Dmytro Myshnyov	6	0	0	1	0	0	1	0	0	8	0	0
11	MF	(Ukraine)	Vyacheslav Churko	2	0	0	0	0	0	0	0	0	2	0	0
13	DF	(Ukraine)	Serhiy Yavorskyi	7	1	0	1	0	0	0	0	0	8	1	0
17	MF	(Ukraine)	Serhiy Horbunov	1	0	0	0	0	0	0	0	0	1	0	0
19	DF	(Ukraine)	Ihor Tyschenko	5	0	0	2	0	0	0	0	0	7	0	0
20	DF	(Ukraine)	Oleksiy Kashchuk	1	0	0	0	0	0	0	0	0	1	0	0
22	MF	(Ukraine)	Illya Putrya	2	0	0	0	0	0	0	0	0	2	0	0
25	MF	(Ukraine)	Valeriy Fedorchuk	5	1	0	1	1	0	0	0	0	6	2	0
29	DF	(Ukraine)	Ihor Kyryukhantsev	2	0	0	0	0	0	0	0	0	2	0	0
34	MF	(Ukraine)	Valeriy Fedorchuk	1	0	0	1	0	0	0	0	0	2	0	0
37	DF	(Ukraine)	Nazariy Muravskyi	1	2	0	0	0	0	0	0	0	1	2	0
71	MF	(Ukraine)	Maksym Chekh	5	0	0	0	0	0	1	0	0	6	0	0
73	MF	(Ukraine)	Danylo Ihnatenko	6	2	0	1	0	0	0	0	0	7	2	0
77	DF	(Ukraine)	Andriy Kulakov	4	0	0	0	0	0	0	0	0	4	0	0
86	DF	(Ukraine)	Ruslan Fomin	2	0	0	1	0	0	0	0	0	3	0	0
99	DF	(Ukraine)	Vladyslav Vakula	6	0	0	0	0	0	0	0	0	6	0	0
			Total	82	7	2	12	1	0	3	0	0	97	8	2

Last updated: 29 July 2020

=== Attendances ===
	Matches	Attendances	Average	High	Low
Premier League	16	43,035	2,689	8,425	0
Cup	2	1,917	958	1,917	0
Europa League	1	4,426	4,426	4,426	4,426
Total	19	49,378	2,691	8,425	0

Last updated: 29 July 2020
