= 2021–22 FC Shakhtar Donetsk season =

Shakhtar Donetsk
2021–22 season
- Chairman: Rinat Akhmetov
- Manager: Roberto De Zerbi
- Stadium: NSC Olimpiyskiy
- Premier League: 1st (no title awarded)
- Ukrainian Cup: Quarter-finals (cancelled)
- Ukrainian Super Cup: Winners
- UEFA Champions League: Group stage
- Top goalscorer: League: Tetê (9); All: Tetê (10)
- Highest home attendance: 34,037 vs Real Madrid (19 October 2021)
- Lowest home attendance: 1,487 vs Lviv (3 December 2021)
- Average home league attendance: 12,693 (3 December 2021)
Home colours	Away colours	Third colours

The 2021–22 season was FC Shakhtar Donetsk's 31st season in existence and the club's 23rd consecutive season in the top flight of Ukrainian football. In addition to the domestic league, Shakhtar Donetsk participated in this season's editions of the Ukrainian Cup, the Ukrainian Super Cup and the UEFA Champions League. The season covered the period from 24 July 2021 to 30 June 2022.

== Season events ==
On 12 May, Luís Castro and his coaching staff left Shakhtar Donetsk. On 25 May, Roberto De Zerbi is going to be Shakhtar head coach for the next two seasons.

For the season in a row, Shakhtar Donetsk will play their home games for at the NSC Olimpiyskiy in Kyiv.

On 20 July, Shakhtar Donetsk announced the signing of Vinicius Tobias from Internacional, with the defender joining Shakhtar Donetsk in February 2021 once he turns 18.

On 26 July, Marquinhos Cipriano joined Sion on a season-long loan deal.

On 8 November, Shakhtar Donetsk announced that Dentinho was leaving the club after 10 years.

On 8 December, Júnior Moraes extended his contract with Shakhtar Donetsk until 30 June 2022. The following day, 9 December, Alan Patrick and Maycon both extended their contracts with Shakhtar Donetsk until 31 December 2025.

On 12 December, Shakhtar Donetsk announced that Marlos would leave the club when his contract expired at the end of the year.

On 15 January, Shakhtar Donetsk announced the signing of David Neres from AFC Ajax, on a contract until 31 December 2026. Also on 15 January, Shakhtar Donetsk confirmed the signing of Vinicius Tobias from Internacional.

On 30 January, Danylo Ihnatenko joined Girondins de Bordeaux on loan for the remainder of the season. The following day, 31 January, Danylo Sikan joined Hansa Rostock on loan for the remainder of the season.

On 12 February, Shakhtar Donetsk announced that Yevhen Konoplyanka had been released by the club. The following day, Shakhtar Donetsk extended their contracts with Mykhailo Mudryk and Heorhiy Sudakov until 31 December 2026.

On 24 February, the Ukrainian Premier League was suspended due to the imposition of Martial law in Ukraine due to the Russian invasion.

On 16 March, Júnior Moraes joined Corinthians on a permanent deal until December 2023.

On 29 March, Azerbaijan Premier League club Sabah announced the signing of Oleksiy Kashchuk on loan until the end of the season.

On 31 March, Shakhtar Donetsk confirmed that Maycon had joined Corinthians on loan until the end of 2022. On the same day, Olympique Lyonnais announced the signing of Tetê on a contract until 30 June 2022, Tetê's contract currently being suspended with Shakhtar Donetsk.

On 1 April, Vinicius Tobias joined Real Madrid on loan until the end of the 2022–23 season, with an option to make the move permanent.

On 3 April, Shakhtar announced that they would play friendly matches in Turkey against Beşiktaş, Fenerbahçe, Sevilla, Hajduk Split, Paris Saint-Germain and Lazio to help raise funds for Ukraine.

On 7 April, Internacional announced the signing of Vitão on a contract until 30 June 2022, under the same rules that saw Tetê joining Olympique Lyonnais.

On 12 April, Shakhtar announced that former captain, Yaroslav Rakitskyi, had returned to the club to train and play for the club during their Global Tour for Peace matches. The following day, Alan Patrick left the club to sign permanently for Internacional.

On 26 April, the Premier League season was terminated due to the 2022 Russian invasion of Ukraine, with the standings reflecting the positions of each team heading into the winter break, meaning Shakhtar Donetsk finished in first position.

== Squad ==
As of match played 11 December 2021

Number	Player	Nationality	Position	Date of birth (age)	Signed from	Signed in	Contract ends	Apps.	Goals
Goalkeepers
1	Oleksiy Shevchenko	(Ukraine)	GK	24 February 1992 (aged 30)	Karpaty Lviv	2018		8	0
12	Tymur Puzankov	(Ukraine)	GK	4 March 2003 (aged 19)	Academy	2021		0	0
30	Andriy Pyatov	(Ukraine)	GK	28 June 1984 (aged 37)	Vorskla Poltava	2007	2023	480	0
54	Yevhen Hrytsenko	(Ukraine)	GK	5 February 1995 (aged 27)	Academy	2012		0	0
81	Anatoliy Trubin	(Ukraine)	GK	1 August 2001 (aged 20)	Academy	2019		56	0
Defenders
2	Dodô	(Brazil)	DF	17 November 1998 (aged 23)	Coritiba	2018	2022	96	5
4	Serhiy Kryvtsov	(Ukraine)	DF	15 March 1991 (aged 31)	Metalurh Zaporizhya	2010		212	13
5	Marlon	(Brazil)	DF	7 September 1995 (aged 26)	Sassuolo	2021	2026	22	0
22	Mykola Matviyenko	(Ukraine)	DF	2 May 1996 (aged 25)	Academy	2015		30	6
26	Yukhym Konoplya	(Ukraine)	DF	26 August 1999 (aged 22)	Academy	2017		11	1
31	Ismaily	(Brazil)	DF	11 January 1990 (aged 32)	Braga	2013		228	16
44	Viktor Korniyenko	(Ukraine)	DF	14 February 1999 (aged 23)	Academy	2016		29	1
77	Valeriy Bondar	(Ukraine)	DF	27 February 1999 (aged 23)	Academy	2019		39	1
Midfielders
6	Taras Stepanenko	(Ukraine)	MF	8 August 1989 (aged 32)	Metalurh Zaporizhya	2010		357	26
8	Marcos Antônio	(Brazil)	MF	13 June 2000 (aged 21)	Estoril	2019		101	9
15	Artem Bondarenko	(Ukraine)	MF	21 August 2000 (aged 21)	Academy	2020		14	1
17	Maksym Malyshev	(Ukraine)	MF	24 December 1992 (aged 29)	Academy	2009		77	7
19	Manor Solomon	(Israel)	MF	24 July 1999 (aged 22)	Maccabi Petah Tikva	2019		106	22
20	Mykhailo Mudryk	(Ukraine)	MF	5 January 2001 (aged 21)	Academy	2019	2026	25	2
25	Heorhiy Sudakov	(Ukraine)	MF	1 September 2002 (aged 19)	Academy	2020	2026	28	5
38	Pedrinho	(Brazil)	MF	13 April 1998 (aged 24)	Benfica	2021	2026	19	4
50	Serhiy Bolbat	(Ukraine)	MF	13 January 1993 (aged 29)	Olimpik Donetsk	2011		63	3
99	Fernando	(Brazil)	MF	1 March 1999 (aged 23)	Palmeiras	2018		69	12
Forwards
11	David Neres	(Brazil)	FW	3 March 1997 (aged 25)	Ajax	2022	2026	0	0
23	Lassina Traoré	(Burkina Faso)	FW	12 January 2001 (aged 21)	Ajax	2021	2026	14	9
Contracts suspended
3	Vitão	(Brazil)	DF	2 February 2000 (aged 22)	Palmeiras	2019	2024	36	0
14	Tetê	(Brazil)	MF	15 February 2000 (aged 22)	Grêmio	2019		107	31
Away on loan
7	Maycon	(Brazil)	MF	15 July 1997 (aged 24)	Corinthians	2018	2025	98	8
28	Marquinhos Cipriano	(Brazil)	MF	27 March 1999 (aged 23)	São Paulo	2018		25	1
45	Danylo Sikan	(Ukraine)	FW	16 April 2001 (aged 21)	Karpaty Lviv	2019		22	2
52	Ihor Kyryukhantsev	(Ukraine)	DF	29 January 1996 (aged 26)	Academy	2013			
	Vinicius Tobias	(Brazil)	DF	23 February 2004 (aged 18)	Internacional	2022		0	0
	Valeriy Bondarenko	(Ukraine)	DF	3 February 1994 (aged 28)	Oleksandriya	2019		1	0
	Maksym Chekh	(Ukraine)	MF	3 January 1999 (aged 23)	Academy	2018			
	Danylo Ihnatenko	(Ukraine)	MF	14 February 1996 (aged 26)	Metalurh Zaporizhya	2016		0	0
	Oleksiy Kashchuk	(Ukraine)	MF	29 June 2000 (aged 21)	Vorskla Poltava	2016			
	Andriy Kulakov	(Ukraine)	MF	28 April 1999 (aged 22)	Metalist Kharkiv	2016			
	Dmytro Topalov	(Ukraine)	MF	12 March 1998 (aged 24)	Academy	2017			
	Vladyslav Vakula	(Ukraine)	MF	29 April 1999 (aged 22)	Mariupol	2019	2024	4	0
	Olarenwaju Kayode	(Nigeria)	FW	8 May 1993 (aged 28)	Manchester City	2018	2023	24	4
	Andriy Boryachuk	(Ukraine)	FW	23 April 1996 (aged 26)	Academy	2015		17	6
	Bohdan Viunnyk	(Ukraine)	FW	21 May 2002 (aged 19)	Academy	2020		6	0
Players who left during the season
9	Dentinho	(Brazil)	FW	19 January 1989 (aged 33)	Corinthians	2011		197	29
10	Júnior Moraes	(Ukraine)	FW	4 April 1987 (aged 35)	Dynamo Kyiv	2018	2022	105	59
11	Marlos	(Ukraine)	MF	7 June 1988 (aged 33)	Metalist Kharkiv	2014		287	74
21	Alan Patrick	(Brazil)	MF	13 February 1991 (aged 31)	Santos	2011	2025	177	26
70	Yevhen Konoplyanka	(Ukraine)	MF	29 September 1989 (aged 32)	Schalke 04	2019	2022	44	5
	Mark Mampassi	(Ukraine)	DF	12 March 2003 (aged 19)	Academy	2020		0	0

=== Contract suspensions ===
Note: Flags indicate national team as defined under FIFA eligibility rules; some limited exceptions apply. Players may hold more than one non-FIFA nationality.

No.	Pos.	Nation	Player
3	DF	BRA	Vitão (at Internacional until 30 June 2022)
14	MF	BRA	Tetê (at Olympique Lyonnais until 30 June 2022)

=== On loan ===
Note: Flags indicate national team as defined under FIFA eligibility rules; some limited exceptions apply. Players may hold more than one non-FIFA nationality.

No.	Pos.	Nation	Player
7	MF	BRA	Maycon (on loan at Corinthians until 31 December 2022)
28	MF	BRA	Marquinhos Cipriano (on loan at Sion until 30 June 2022)
45	FW	UKR	Danylo Sikan (on loan at Hansa Rostock until 30 June 2022)
—	DF	BRA	Vinicius Tobias (on loan at Real Madrid until 30 June 2023)
—	DF	UKR	Valeriy Bondarenko (on loan at Vorskla Poltava until 30 June 2022)
—	MF	UKR	Maksym Chekh (on loan at Mariupol until 30 June 2022)
—	MF	UKR	Danylo Ihnatenko (on loan at Girondins de Bordeaux until 30 June 2022)

No.	Pos.	Nation	Player
—	MF	UKR	Oleksiy Kashchuk (on loan at Sabah until 30 June 2022)
—	MF	UKR	Andriy Kulakov (on loan at Mariupol until 30 June 2022)
—	MF	UKR	Dmytro Topalov (on loan at Mariupol until 30 June 2022)
—	MF	UKR	Vladyslav Vakula (on loan at Vorskla Poltava until 30 June 2022)
—	FW	NGR	Olarenwaju Kayode (on loan at Sivasspor until 30 June 2022)
—	FW	UKR	Andriy Boryachuk (on loan at Rukh Lviv until 30 June 2022)
—	MF	UKR	Bohdan Viunnyk (on loan at Mariupol until 30 June 2022)

== Transfers ==
=== In ===
Date	Position	Nationality	Name	From	Fee	Ref.
9 June 2021	MF	(Brazil)	Pedrinho	Benfica	€18,000,000	
18 June 2021	FW	(Burkina Faso)	Lassina Traoré	Ajax	€8,000,000	
22 June 2021	DF	(Brazil)	Marlon	Sassuolo	Undisclosed	
20 July 2021	DF	(Brazil)	Vinicius Tobias	Internacional	Undisclosed	
15 January 2022	FW	(Brazil)	David Neres	Ajax	Undisclosed	

† Tobias' move was announced on the above date, and activated on 15 January 2022.

=== Out ===
Date	Position	Nationality	Name	To	Fee	Ref.
25 June 2021	MF	(Ukraine)	Oleksandr Pikhalyonok	Dnipro-1	Undisclosed	
6 July 2021	DF	(Georgia (country))	Davit Khocholava	Copenhagen	Undisclosed	
17 December 2021	DF	(Ukraine)	Mark Mampassi	Lokomotiv Moscow	Undisclosed	
16 March 2022	FW	(Ukraine)	Júnior Moraes	Corinthians	Undisclosed	
13 April 2022	MF	(Brazil)	Alan Patrick	Internacional	Undisclosed	

=== Loans out ===
Date from	Position	Nationality	Name	To	Date to	Ref.
2 October 2020	MF	(Ukraine)	Danylo Ihnatenko	Dnipro-1	30 January 2022	
8 July 2021	DF	(Ukraine)	Valeriy Bondarenko	Vorskla Poltava	End of season	
8 July 2021	FW	(Nigeria)	Olarenwaju Kayode	Sivasspor	End of season	
22 July 2021	FW	(Ukraine)	Bohdan Viunnyk	Mariupol	End of season	
26 July 2021	MF	(Brazil)	Marquinhos Cipriano	Sion	End of season	
30 January 2022	MF	(Ukraine)	Danylo Ihnatenko	Girondins de Bordeaux	End of season	
31 January 2022	FW	(Ukraine)	Danylo Sikan	Hansa Rostock	End of season	
29 March 2022	MF	(Ukraine)	Oleksiy Kashchuk	Sabah	End of season	
31 March 2022	MF	(Brazil)	Maycon	Corinthians	31 December 2022	
1 April 2022	DF	(Brazil)	Vinicius Tobias	Real Madrid	End of the 2022/23 season	

=== Contract suspensions ===
Date	Position	Nationality	Name	Joined	Date	Ref.
31 March 2022	MF	(Brazil)	Tetê	Olympique Lyonnais	30 June 2022	
7 April 2022	DF	(Brazil)	Vitão	Internacional	30 June 2022	

=== Released ===
Date	Position	Nationality	Name	Joined	Date	Ref.
8 November 2021	FW	(Brazil)	Dentinho	Ceará	2 March 2022	
31 December 2021	MF	(Ukraine)	Marlos	Athletico Paranaense	1 February 2022	
11 February 2022	MF	(Ukraine)	Yevhen Konoplyanka	KS Cracovia	11 February 2022	
30 June 2022	DF	(Ukraine)	Daniel Ehbudzhuo	Arminia Hannover	31 January 2024	
30 June 2022	MF	(Ukraine)	Yevhen Hrytsenko	Van	7 November 2022	
30 June 2022	FW	(Ukraine)	Stanislav Biblyk	Aluston-YUBK Alushta	1 September 2022	

== Friendlies ==
30 June 2021	SK St. Johann (Austria)	0–5	(Ukraine) Shakhtar Donetsk	Austria
18:00 EEST (UTC+3)		Report	Tetê 2'; Mudryk 7'; Traoré 10'; Korniyenko 24'; Dentinho 71'

4 July 2021	Raków Częstochowa (Poland)	2–5	(Ukraine) Shakhtar Donetsk	Saalfelden, Austria
18:00 EEST (UTC+3)	Kun 14'; Ivi 72' (pen.)	Report	Solomon 81' (pen.)

5 July 2021	Türkgücü München (Germany)	1–2	(Ukraine) Shakhtar Donetsk	Saalfelden, Austria
18:00 EEST (UTC+3)	Slišković 81'	Report	Solomon 43' (pen.); Mudryk 85'

9 July 2021	Schalke 04 (Germany)	0–0	(Ukraine) Shakhtar Donetsk	Mittersill, Austria
19:00 EEST (UTC+3)		Report		Stadium: SC Mittersill

20 July 2021	Shakhtar Donetsk	5–0	Obolon Kyiv	Kyiv
18:00 EEST (UTC+3)	Pedrinho 8'; Solomon 18'; Maycon 37'; Traoré 38'; A.Bondarenko 47'	Report		Stadium: NSC Olimpiyskiy

24 January 2022	Wolfsberger AC (Austria)	1–4	(Ukraine) Shakhtar Donetsk	Turkey
15:30 EET (UTC+2)	Lochoshvili 37'	Report	Sudakov 77'; Moraes 80', 90'; Tetê 88'

28 January 2022	Shakhtar Donetsk	0–0	Mariupol	Belek, Turkey
EET (UTC+2)		Report		Stadium: Regnum Sport Center

31 January 2022	Shakhtar Donetsk (Ukraine)	3–2	(Serbia) Red Star Belgrade	Turkey
16:00 EET (UTC+2)	Mudryk 13'; Neres 18', 72'	Report	Dragović 58'; Omoijuanfo 68'

12 February 2022	Shakhtar Donetsk (Ukraine)	2–1	(Kazakhstan) Shakhter Karagandy	Belek, Turkey
16:00 EET (UTC+2)	Neres 35' (pen.); Konoplya 90'	Report	Malyarov 77'	Stadium: Regnum Sport Center

15 February 2022	Shakhtar Donetsk	1–2	Mariupol	Belek, Turkey
16:00 EET (UTC+2)	Tetê 48'	Report	Kulakov 41'; Kholod 58'	Stadium: Regnum Sport Center

18 February 2022	Shakhtar Donetsk (Ukraine)	3–0	(Kazakhstan) Astana	Belek, Turkey
16:00 EET (UTC+2)	Mudryk 2'; Tetê 89'; Neres 90+1'	Report		Stadium: Regnum Sport Center

19 February 2022	Shakhtar Donetsk (Ukraine)	0–0	(Latvia) Riga	Belek, Turkey
16:00 EET (UTC+2)		Report		Stadium: Regnum Sport Center

9 April 2022 Global Tour for Peace	Olympiacos (Greece)	1–0	(Ukraine) Shakhtar Donetsk	Athens, Greece
20:00 EEST (UTC+3)	Tiquinho 22'	Report		Stadium: Karaiskakis Stadium

14 April 2022 Global Tour for Peace	Lechia Gdańsk (Poland)	2–3	(Ukraine) Shakhtar Donetsk	Gdańsk, Poland
19:30 EEST (UTC+3)	Diabaté 12'; K.Okoniewski 90+3'	Report	Mudryk 7' (pen.), 58'; D. Keda 90+3'	Stadium: Polsat Plus Arena Gdańsk; Attendance: 12,620

19 April 2022 Global Tour for Peace	Fenerbahçe (Turkey)	1–0	(Ukraine) Shakhtar Donetsk	Istanbul, Turkey
17:00 EEST (UTC+3)	Valencia 26'	Report		Stadium: Şükrü Saracoğlu Stadium

25 April 2022 Global Tour for Peace	Antalyaspor (Turkey)	1–2	(Ukraine) Shakhtar Donetsk	Antalya, Turkey
20:30 EEST (UTC+3)	Erdilman 9'	Report	Solomon 21'; Topalov 76'	Stadium: Antalya Stadium

1 May 2022 Global Tour for Peace	Hajduk Split (Croatia)	3–3	(Ukraine) Shakhtar Donetsk	Split, Croatia
16:00 EEST (UTC+3)	Ljubičić 10'; F. Lazar 49'; Ljubičić 80'	Report	Topalov 59'; Stasyuk 74'; Boryachuk 90+1'	Stadium: Stadion Poljud

2022 Global Tour for Peace	Sevilla (Spain)	–	(Ukraine) Shakhtar Donetsk
EEST (UTC+3)

2022 Global Tour for Peace	Paris Saint-Germain (France)	–	(Ukraine) Shakhtar Donetsk
EEST (UTC+3)

2022 Global Tour for Peace	Lazio (Italy)	–	(Ukraine) Shakhtar Donetsk
EEST (UTC+3)

2022 Global Tour for Peace	Beşiktaş (Turkey)	–	(Ukraine) Shakhtar Donetsk	Istanbul, Turkey
EEST (UTC+3)

== Competitions ==
=== Overall record ===
Competition	First match	Last match	Starting round	Final position	Record							
Competition	First match	Last match	Starting round	Final position	Pld	W	D	L	GF	GA	GD	Win %
Premier League	24 July 2021	11 December 2021	Matchday 1	1st (no title awarded)	18	15	2	1	49	10	+39	83.33
Ukrainian Cup	27 October 2021		Round of 16	Quarter-finals (cancelled)	1	1	0	0	3	0	+3	100.00
Super Cup	22 September 2021		Final	Winners	1	1	0	0	3	0	+3	100.00
Champions League	3 August 2021	7 December 2021	Third qualifying round	Group stage	10	3	3	4	9	16	−7	30.00
Total					30	20	5	5	64	26	+38	66.67

Source: Results

=== Premier League ===
==== League table ====
Pos	Team	Pld	W	D	L	GF	GA	GD	Pts	Qualification or relegation
1	Shakhtar Donetsk	18	15	2	1	49	10	+39	47	Qualification for the Champions League group stage
2	Dynamo Kyiv	18	14	3	1	47	9	+38	45	Qualification for the Champions League second qualifying round
3	Dnipro-1	18	13	1	4	35	17	+18	40	Qualification for the Europa League play-off round
4	Zorya Luhansk	18	11	3	4	37	19	+18	36	Qualification for the Europa Conference League third qualifying round
5	Vorskla Poltava	18	9	6	3	30	18	+12	33	Qualification for the Europa Conference League second qualifying round

Source: upl.ua
Rules for classification: 1) Points; 2) Head-to-head points; 3) Head-to-head goal difference; 4) Head-to-head higher number of goals scored; 5) Goal difference; 6) higher number of goals scored; 7) Draw or "Golden match" if two teams tied for title (Article 22, paragraph 3).

==== Results summary ====
Overall								Home						Away					
Pld	W	D	L	GF	GA	GD	Pts	W	D	L	GF	GA	GD	W	D	L	GF	GA	GD
18	15	2	1	49	10	+39	47	8	0	1	29	7	+22	7	2	0	20	3	+17

Source: Results

==== Results by round ====
Round	1	2	3	4	5	6	7	8	9	10	11	12	13	14	15	16	17	18
Ground	H	A	H	H	A	A	H	A	H	A	H	A	H	A	H	A	H	A
Result	W	W	L	W	W	D	W	W	W	D	W	W	W	W	W	W	W	W
Position	3	2	7	3	2	2	2	2	2	2	2	2	2	1	2	2	1	1

Source: Results
A = Away; H = Home; W = Win; D = Draw; L = Loss

==== Results ====
24 July 2021 1	Shakhtar Donetsk	2–0	Inhulets Petrove	Kyiv
19:30 EEST (UTC+3)	Traoré 12'; Alan Patrick 34'; Tetê (yellow card) 90+3'	Report	Zaporozhets (yellow card) 40'; Pavlov (yellow card) 66'; Gopey 81'	Stadium: NSC Olimpiyskiy; Attendance: 9,129; Referee: Dmytro Kryvushkin

30 July 2021 2	Lviv	0–3	Shakhtar Donetsk	Lviv
19:00 EEST (UTC+3)	Antwi (yellow card) 28'; Nych (yellow card) 66'; Busko (yellow card) 70'	Report	Tetê (yellow card) 39'; Korniyenko (yellow card) 54'; Traoré 73' (yellow card) 85'; Dentinho 85'; Pedrinho 90+4'	Stadium: Ukraina Stadium; Attendance: 8,640; Referee: Mykola Balakin

7 August 2021 3	Shakhtar Donetsk	1–2	Oleksandriya	Kyiv
19:30 EEST (UTC+3)	Korniyenko 15'; Antônio (yellow card) 80'	Report	Tretyakov 6'; Kovalets 21'; Rybalka (yellow card) 90+3'	Stadium: NSC Olimpiyskiy; Attendance: 8,779; Referee: Volodymyr Novohatnii

13 August 2021 4	Shakhtar Donetsk	2–0	Metalist 1925 Kharkiv	Kyiv
19:30 EEST (UTC+3)	Marlon (yellow card) 31'; Kryvtsov (yellow card) 33'; Stepanenko 49'; Traoré 80'	Report	Zapadnya (yellow card) 16'; Remenyuk (yellow card) 32'; Shershen (yellow card) 82'; Batyushyn (yellow card) 85'	Stadium: NSC Olimpiyskiy; Attendance: 7,137; Referee: Oleksandr Shandor

21 August 2021 5	Chornomorets Odesa	0–3	Shakhtar Donetsk	Odesa
19:30 EEST (UTC+3)	Biloshevskyi (red card) 13'	Report	Sudakov 34'; Alan Patrick 45+5'; Solomon 90+3'	Stadium: Chornomorets Stadium; Attendance: 12,351; Referee: Denys Shurman

29 August 2021 6	Mynai	1–1	Shakhtar Donetsk	Kyiv
17:00 EEST (UTC+3)	Honchar (yellow card) 58'; Akhmedzade 76'; Kuliyev (yellow card) 90+5' (yellow-red card)	Report	Marlon (yellow card) 9' (yellow-red card) 16'; Traoré 34' (pen.); Marlos (yellow card) 57'; Dodô (red card) 90+5'	Stadium: NSC Olimpiyskiy; Attendance: 5,500; Referee: Monzul Kateryna

11 September 2021 7	Shakhtar Donetsk	2–0	Dnipro-1	Kyiv
19:30 EEST (UTC+3)	Fernando 15'; Maycon (yellow card) 29'; Traoré 87'	Report	Svatok (yellow card) 31'; Di Franco (yellow card) 60'	Stadium: NSC Olimpiyskiy; Attendance: 13,194; Referee: Andrii Kovalenko

18 September 2021 8	Mariupol	0–5	Shakhtar Donetsk	Kovalivka
17:00 EEST (UTC+3)	Mykytsey (yellow card) 90+1'	Report	Sikan 18'; Mudryk 20'; Tetê 54'; Sudakov 77', 80'	Stadium: Kolos Stadium; Attendance: 561; Referee: Yurii Ivanov
Note: Match played at the Kolos Stadium in Kovalivka, instead of Mariupol's regular Volodymyr Boiko Stadium in Mariupol.

25 September 2021 9	Shakhtar Donetsk	4–1	Veres Rivne	Kyiv
17:00 EEST (UTC+3)	Miroshnyk 22' (o.g.); Kryvtsov (yellow card) 40'; Tetê 55'; Marlos 79' (pen.); Traoré 86'	Report	Pasich 30'; Kucherov (yellow card) 41'; Panasenko (yellow card) 60'; Dakhnovskyi (yellow card) 90+2'	Stadium: NSC Olimpiyskiy; Attendance: 6,014; Referee: Dmytro Bondarenko

2 October 2021 10	Dynamo Kyiv	0–0	Shakhtar Donetsk	Kyiv
19:30 EEST (UTC+3)	Shaparenko (yellow card) 70'; Vitinho (yellow card) 80'	Report	Marlon (yellow card) 25'; Kryvtsov (yellow card) 68'; Sikan (yellow card) 68'; Tetê (yellow card) 77'	Stadium: NSC Olimpiyskiy; Attendance: 28,073; Referee: Oleksandr Shandor

16 October 2021 11	Shakhtar Donetsk	6–1	Zorya Luhansk	Kyiv
17:00 EEST (UTC+3)	Fernando 11', 36'; Pedrinho 28'; Tetê 71', 90+1'; Sikan 80'	Report	Hromov (yellow card) 13'; Hladkyi 63'; Sayyadmanesh (yellow card) 90'	Stadium: NSC Olimpiyskiy; Attendance: 6,475; Referee: Ihor Paskhal

23 October 2021 12	Vorskla Poltava	0–2	Shakhtar Donetsk	Poltava
17:00 EEST (UTC+3)	Thill (yellow card) 19' (yellow-red card) 29'; Perduta (yellow card) 59'	Report	Fernando (yellow card) 41'; Tetê 65'; Solomon 78'	Stadium: Oleksiy Butovsky Vorskla Stadium; Attendance: 12,376; Referee: Serhii Boiko

30 October 2021 13	Shakhtar Donetsk	4–1	Desna Chernihiv	Kyiv
17:00 EET (UTC+2)	Solomon 8'; Sudakov 27'; Stepanenko (yellow card) 51'; Tetê 62'; Fernando 64'; Bondar (yellow card) 70'	Report	Bezborodko 23'	Stadium: NSC Olimpiyskiy; Attendance: 3,184; Referee: Denys Shurman

7 November 2021 14	Kolos Kovalivka	1–3	Shakhtar Donetsk	Kovalivka
17:00 EET (UTC+2)	Chornomorets (yellow card) 32'; Ilyin 41'; Lysenko (yellow card) 45'; Novak (yellow card) 80'	Report	Matviyenko 14'; Fernando 25' (yellow card) 79'; Bondarenko (yellow card) 36'; Patrick (yellow card) 46'; Marlos (yellow card) 59'; Mudryk 72'	Stadium: Kolos Stadium; Attendance: 1,852; Referee: Volodymyr Novohatnii

20 November 2021 15	Shakhtar Donetsk	2–0	Rukh Lviv	Kyiv
17:00 EET (UTC+2)	Antônio 86'; Tetê 88'	Report	Didyk (yellow card) 39'; Boychuk (yellow card) 59'; Alvarenga (yellow card) 63'	Stadium: NSC Olimpiyskiy; Attendance: 2,106; Referee: Yevhen Aranovskyi

28 November 2021 16	Inhulets Petrove	0–1	Shakhtar Donetsk	Petrove
14:00 EET (UTC+2)	Gopey (yellow card) 15'; Kovalenko (yellow card) 58'	Report	Tetê 32'; Antônio (yellow card) 70'; Sikan (yellow card) 90+1'	Stadium: Inhulets Stadium; Attendance: 2,744; Referee: Denys Shurman

3 December 2021 17	Shakhtar Donetsk	6–1	Lviv	Kyiv
17:00 EET (UTC+2)	Mudryk (yellow card) 33'; Pedrinho (yellow card) 37' (goal) 55'; Tetê 45' (pen.); Bondarenko 78'; Marlos 85' (pen.); Stepanenko 86'; Konoplya 90'	Report	Ernest 17'; Dovhyi (yellow card) 32'; Mahmutovic (red card) 81'	Stadium: NSC Olimpiyskiy; Attendance: 1,487; Referee: Andrii Kovalenko

11 December 2021 18	Oleksandriya	1–2	Shakhtar Donetsk	Oleksandriia
14:00 EET (UTC+2)	Odaryuk (yellow card) 25'; Miroshnichenko (yellow card) 28'; Babohlo (yellow card) 48'; Rybalka (yellow card) 55'; Kozhushko 63'; Bilyk (yellow card) 70'; Tretyakov (yellow card) 81'; Kalyuzhnyi (yellow card) 90+5'	Report	Ismaily (yellow card) 52'; Solomon 70'; Dodô (yellow card) 70'; Moraes 78'; Pedrinho (yellow card) 88'	Stadium: CSC Nika Stadium; Attendance: 1,366; Referee: Oleksandr Shandor

26 February 2022 19	Metalist 1925 Kharkiv	Cancelled	Shakhtar Donetsk	Kharkiv
EET (UTC+2)				Stadium: OSC Metalist
Note: Match cancelled due to suspension of the championship.

6 March 2022 20	Shakhtar Donetsk	Cancelled	Chornomorets Odesa	Kyiv
EET (UTC+2)				Stadium: NSC Olimpiyskiy
Note: Match cancelled due to suspension of the championship.

12 March 2022 21	Shakhtar Donetsk	Cancelled	Mynai	Kyiv
EET (UTC+2)				Stadium: NSC Olimpiyskiy
Note: Match cancelled due to suspension of the championship.

16 March 2022 22	Dnipro-1	Cancelled	Shakhtar Donetsk	Dnipro
EET (UTC+2)				Stadium: Dnipro-Arena
Note: Match cancelled due to suspension of the championship.

1 April 2022 23	Shakhtar Donetsk	Cancelled	Mariupol	Kyiv
EET (UTC+2)				Stadium: NSC Olimpiyskiy
Note: Match cancelled due to suspension of the championship.

8 April 2022 24	Veres Rivne	Cancelled	Shakhtar Donetsk	Lutsk
EET (UTC+2)				Stadium: Avanhard Stadium
Note: Match cancelled due to suspension of the championship.

15 April 2022 25	Shakhtar Donetsk	Cancelled	Dynamo Kyiv	Kyiv
EET (UTC+2)				Stadium: NSC Olimpiyskiy
Note: Match cancelled due to suspension of the championship.

22 April 2022 26	Zorya Luhansk	Cancelled	Shakhtar Donetsk	Zaporizhzhia
EET (UTC+2)				Stadium: Slavutych-Arena
Note: Match cancelled due to suspension of the championship.

29 April 2022 27	Shakhtar Donetsk	Cancelled	Vorskla Poltava	Kyiv
EET (UTC+2)				Stadium: NSC Olimpiyskiy
Note: Match cancelled due to suspension of the championship.

6 May 2022 28	Desna Chernihiv	Cancelled	Shakhtar Donetsk	Chernihiv
EET (UTC+2)				Stadium: Chernihiv Stadium
Note: Match cancelled due to suspension of the championship.

13 May 2022 29	Shakhtar Donetsk	Cancelled	Kolos Kovalivka	Kyiv
EET (UTC+2)				Stadium: NSC Olimpiyskiy
Note: Match cancelled due to suspension of the championship.

20 May 2022 30	Rukh Lviv	Cancelled	Shakhtar Donetsk	Lviv
EET (UTC+2)				Stadium: Arena Lviv
Note: Match cancelled due to suspension of the championship.

=== Ukrainian Cup ===
27 October 2021 Round of 16	Chornomorets Odesa	0–3	Shakhtar Donetsk	Odesa
19:30 EEST (UTC+3)	Smyrnyi (yellow card) 15'; Tsitaishvili (yellow card) 65'; Mykhaylenko (yellow card) 90+2'	Report	Konoplya (yellow card) 37'; Fernando 64'; Antônio 72'; Dentinho 81'	Stadium: Chornomorets Stadium; Attendance: 1,472; Referee: Oleksandr Shandor

2 March 2022 Quarterfinal	Lviv	Cancelled	Shakhtar Donetsk	Lviv
EEST (UTC+3)				Stadium: Ukraina Stadium
Note: Match cancelled due to suspension of the championship.

=== Ukrainian Super Cup ===
22 September 2021 Final	Shakhtar Donetsk	3–0	Dynamo Kyiv	Kyiv
21:00 EEST (UTC+3)	Traoré 30', 54'; Patrick (yellow card) 39' (goal) 61'; Marlon (yellow card) 59'; Kryvtsov (yellow card) 77'; Pedrinho (yellow card) 88'	Report	Buyalskyi (yellow card) 42'; De Pena (yellow card) 43'; Shaparenko (yellow card) 63'; Syrota (yellow card) 71'; Tsyhankov (yellow card) 80'	Stadium: NSC Olimpiyskiy; Attendance: 27,553; Referee: Andryii Kovalenko

=== UEFA Champions League ===
==== Third qualifying round ====
3 August 2021 First leg	Genk (Belgium)	1–2	(Ukraine) Shakhtar Donetsk	Genk, Belgium
21:00 EEST (UTC+3)	Onuachu 39'; Muñoz (yellow card) 62'; Thorstvedt (yellow card) 69'	Report	Pedrinho (yellow card) 50'; Tetê 63' (pen.); Marlon (yellow card) 66'; Maycon (yellow card) 68'; Alan Patrick 81'	Stadium: Luminus Arena; Attendance: 5,096; Referee: Anastasios Sidiropoulos (Greece)

10 August 2021 Second leg	Shakhtar Donetsk (Ukraine)	2–1 (4–2 agg.)	(Belgium) Genk	Kyiv, Ukraine
20:30 EEST (UTC+3)	Traoré 27'; Sudakov (yellow card) 42'; Trubin (yellow card) 71'; Marcos Antônio 76'; Vitão (yellow card) 90+2'	Report	Lucumí (yellow card) 45+2'; Dessers 90'; Muñoz (yellow card) 90+5'	Stadium: NSC Olimpiyskiy; Attendance: 20,594; Referee: Benoît Bastien (France)

==== Play-off round ====
17 August 2021 First leg	Monaco (France)	0–1	(Ukraine) Shakhtar Donetsk	Monaco, France
21:00 CEST (UTC+2)		Report	Pedrinho 19'; Stepanenko (yellow card) 87'; Patrick (yellow card) 90'	Stadium: Stade Louis II; Attendance: 5,700; Referee: Danny Makkelie (Netherlands)

25 August 2021 Second leg	Shakhtar Donetsk (Ukraine)	2–2 (a.e.t.) (3–2 agg.)	(France) Monaco	Kharkiv, Ukraine
21:00 EEST (UTC+3)	Dodô (yellow card) 40'; Tetê (yellow card) 54'; Marlon (yellow card) 70'; Marlos 74'; Solomon (yellow card) 80'; Kryvtsov (yellow card) 105+1'; Fernando (yellow card) 113'; Aguilar 114' (o.g.)	Report	Volland (yellow card) 14'; Ben Yedder 18', 39'; Golovin (yellow card) 72'; Fofana (yellow card) 81'; Badiashile (yellow card) 107'	Stadium: OSC Metalist; Attendance: 26,697; Referee: Anthony Taylor (England)
Note: Match moved to the OSC Metalist in Kharkiv due to a concert dedicated to the Independence Day of Ukraine at the NSC Olimpiyskiy in Kyiv on 24 August.

==== Group stage ====
Pos	Team	Pld	W	D	L	GF	GA	GD	Pts	Qualification
1	(Spain) Real Madrid	6	5	0	1	14	3	+11	15	Advance to knockout phase
2	(Italy) Inter Milan	6	3	1	2	8	5	+3	10	Advance to knockout phase
3	(Moldova) Sheriff Tiraspol	6	2	1	3	7	11	−4	7	Transfer to Europa League
4	(Ukraine) Shakhtar Donetsk	6	0	2	4	2	12	−10	2	

Source: UEFA
Rules for classification: Group stage tiebreakers

15 September 2021 1	Sheriff Tiraspol (Moldova)	2–0	(Ukraine) Shakhtar Donetsk	Tiraspol, Moldova
19:45 EEST (UTC+3)	Traoré 16'; Dulanto (yellow card) 42'; Yansané 62'	Report		Stadium: Sheriff Stadium; Attendance: 5,205; Referee: Deniz Aytekin (Germany)

28 September 2021 2	Shakhtar Donetsk (Ukraine)	0–0	(Italy) Inter Milan	Kyiv, Ukraine
19:45 EEST (UTC+3)		Report	Dumfries (yellow card) 81'	Stadium: NSC Olimpiyskiy; Attendance: 26,170; Referee: István Kovács (Romania)

19 October 2021 3	Shakhtar Donetsk (Ukraine)	0–5	(Spain) Real Madrid	Kyiv, Ukraine
22:00 EEST (UTC+3)	Antônio (yellow card) 47'	Report	Kryvtsov 37' (o.g.); Vinícius 51', 56'; Rodrygo 65'; Benzema 90+1'	Stadium: NSC Olimpiyskiy; Attendance: 34,037; Referee: Srđan Jovanović (Serbia)

3 November 2021 4	Real Madrid (Spain)	2–1	(Ukraine) Shakhtar Donetsk	Madrid, Spain
21:00 EET (UTC+2)	Benzema 14', 61'; Mendy (yellow card) 39'; Casemiro (yellow card) 63'	Report	Fernando 39'; Dentinho (yellow card) 90+3'	Stadium: Santiago Bernabéu; Attendance: 38,105; Referee: Benoît Bastien (France)

24 November 2021 5	Inter Milan (Italy)	2–0	(Ukraine) Shakhtar Donetsk	Milan, Italy
21:00 EET (UTC+2)	Džeko 61', 67'	Report	Vitão (yellow card) 49'	Stadium: San Siro; Attendance: 46,225; Referee: Ovidiu Hațegan (Romania)

7 December 2021 6	Shakhtar Donetsk (Ukraine)	1–1	(Moldova) Sheriff Tiraspol	Kyiv, Ukraine
22:00 EET (UTC+2)	Fernando (yellow card) 10' (goal) 42'; Mudryk (yellow card) 78'	Report	Addo (yellow card) 18'; Dulanto (yellow card) 83'; Nikolov 90+3'	Stadium: NSC Olimpiyskiy; Attendance: 6,841; Referee: Donatas Rumšas (Lithuania)

== Squad statistics ==
As of match played 11 December 2021

=== Appearances and goals ===
No.	Pos	Nat	Player	Total		Premier League		Ukrainian Cup		Supercup		UEFA Champions League	
No.	Pos	Nat	Player	Apps	Goals	Apps	Goals	Apps	Goals	Apps	Goals	Apps	Goals
1	GK	(Ukraine) UKR	Oleksiy Shevchenko	1	0	0	0	0	0	0	0	0+1	0
2	DF	(Brazil) BRA	Dodô	26	0	14	0	0+1	0	1	0	10	0
4	DF	(Ukraine) UKR	Serhiy Kryvtsov	13	0	5+2	0	1	0	0+1	0	2+2	0
5	DF	(Brazil) BRA	Marlon	22	0	12	0	0	0	1	0	9	0
6	MF	(Ukraine) UKR	Taras Stepanenko	22	2	13	2	0	0	1	0	3+5	0
8	MF	(Brazil) BRA	Marcos Antônio	28	3	8+9	1	1	1	0+1	0	6+3	1
15	MF	(Ukraine) UKR	Artem Bondarenko	9	1	2+4	1	1	0	0	0	1+1	0
19	MF	(Israel) ISR	Manor Solomon	26	4	8+8	4	1	0	0+1	0	7+1	0
20	MF	(Ukraine) UKR	Mykhailo Mudryk	19	2	7+4	2	0+1	0	0	0	1+6	0
22	DF	(Ukraine) UKR	Mykola Matviyenko	23	1	12+2	1	0	0	1	0	8	0
23	FW	(Burkina Faso) BFA	Lassina Traoré	14	9	4+3	6	0	0	1	2	6	1
25	MF	(Ukraine) UKR	Heorhiy Sudakov	14	4	5+5	4	1	0	0	0	1+2	0
26	DF	(Ukraine) UKR	Yukhym Konoplya	11	1	4+5	1	1	0	0+1	0	0	0
30	GK	(Ukraine) UKR	Andriy Pyatov	12	0	6	0	1	0	1	0	4	0
31	DF	(Brazil) BRA	Ismaily	21	0	9+3	0	0+1	0	1	0	4+3	0
38	MF	(Brazil) BRA	Pedrinho	19	4	8+3	3	0	0	1	0	7	1
44	DF	(Ukraine) UKR	Viktor Korniyenko	13	1	7+3	1	1	0	0	0	1+1	0
77	DF	(Ukraine) UKR	Valeriy Bondar	8	0	4+3	0	0	0	0	0	1	0
81	GK	(Ukraine) UKR	Anatoliy Trubin	18	0	12	0	0	0	0	0	6	0
99	MF	(Brazil) BRA	Fernando	14	8	7	5	1	1	0	0	5+1	2
Players who suspended their contracts:
3	DF	(Brazil) BRA	Vitão	15	0	5+4	0	1	0	0	0	5	0
14	MF	(Brazil) BRA	Tetê	28	10	11+6	9	1	0	0	0	8+2	1
Players away on loan:
7	MF	(Brazil) BRA	Maycon	26	0	11+4	0	0	0	1	0	9+1	0
45	FW	(Ukraine) UKR	Danylo Sikan	14	2	3+8	2	0	0	0+1	0	0+2	0
Players who left Shakhtar Donetsk during the season:
9	FW	(Brazil) BRA	Dentinho	7	2	1+3	1	0+1	1	0	0	0+2	0
10	FW	(Ukraine) UKR	Júnior Moraes	1	1	0+1	1	0	0	0	0	0	0
11	MF	(Ukraine) UKR	Marlos	26	3	9+5	2	0+1	0	1	0	1+9	1
21	MF	(Brazil) BRA	Alan Patrick	20	4	10+1	2	0	0	1	1	5+3	1
70	MF	(Ukraine) UKR	Yevhen Konoplyanka	2	0	0	0	0	0	0	0	0+2	0

=== Goalscorers ===
Place	Position	Nation	Number	Name	Premier League	Ukrainian Cup	Super Cup	Champions League	Total
1	MF	(Brazil)	14	Tetê	9	0	0	1	10
2	FW	(Burkina Faso)	23	Lassina Traoré	6	0	2	1	9
3	MF	(Brazil)	99	Fernando	5	1	0	2	8
4	MF	(Ukraine)	25	Heorhiy Sudakov	4	0	0	0	4
4	MF	(Israel)	19	Manor Solomon	4	0	0	0	4
4	MF	(Brazil)	38	Pedrinho	3	0	0	1	4
4	MF	(Brazil)	21	Alan Patrick	2	0	1	1	4
8	MF	(Ukraine)	11	Marlos	2	0	0	1	3
8	MF	(Brazil)	8	Marcos Antônio	1	1	0	1	3
10	FW	(Ukraine)	45	Danylo Sikan	2	0	0	0	2
10	MF	(Ukraine)	20	Mykhailo Mudryk	2	0	0	0	2
10	MF	(Ukraine)	6	Taras Stepanenko	2	0	0	0	2
10	FW	(Brazil)	9	Dentinho	1	1	0	0	2
10				Own goal	1	0	0	1	2
15	DF	(Ukraine)	44	Viktor Korniyenko	1	0	0	0	1
15	DF	(Ukraine)	22	Mykola Matviyenko	1	0	0	0	1
15	MF	(Ukraine)	15	Artem Bondarenko	1	0	0	0	1
15	DF	(Ukraine)	26	Yukhym Konoplya	1	0	0	0	1
15	FW	(Ukraine)	10	Júnior Moraes	1	0	0	0	1
TOTALS					49	3	3	9	64

=== Clean sheets ===
Place	Position	Nation	Number	Name	Premier League	Ukrainian Cup	Super Cup	Champions League	Total
1	GK	(Ukraine)	30	Andriy Pyatov	4	1	1	1	7
2	GK	(Ukraine)	81	Anatoliy Trubin	5	0	0	1	6
TOTALS					9	1	1	2	13

=== Disciplinary record ===
Number	Nation	Position	Name	Premier League		Ukrainian Cup		Super Cup		Champions League		Total	
Number	Nation	Position	Name	Booked	Sent off (straight red)	Booked	Sent off (straight red)	Booked	Sent off (straight red)	Booked	Sent off (straight red)	Booked	Sent off (straight red)
2	(Brazil)	DF	Dodô	1	1	0	0	0	0	1	0	2	1
4	(Ukraine)	DF	Serhiy Kryvtsov	3	0	0	0	1	0	1	0	5	0
5	(Brazil)	DF	Marlon	4	1	0	0	1	0	2	0	7	1
6	(Ukraine)	MF	Taras Stepanenko	1	0	0	0	0	0	1	0	2	0
8	(Brazil)	MF	Marcos Antônio	2	0	0	0	0	0	1	0	3	0
15	(Ukraine)	MF	Artem Bondarenko	1	0	0	0	0	0	0	0	1	0
19	(Israel)	MF	Manor Solomon	0	0	0	0	0	0	1	0	1	0
20	(Ukraine)	MF	Mykhailo Mudryk	1	0	0	0	0	0	1	0	2	0
23	(Burkina Faso)	FW	Lassina Traoré	1	0	0	0	0	0	0	0	1	0
25	(Ukraine)	MF	Heorhiy Sudakov	0	0	0	0	0	0	1	0	1	0
26	(Ukraine)	DF	Yukhym Konoplya	0	0	1	0	0	0	0	0	1	0
31	(Brazil)	DF	Ismaily	1	0	0	0	0	0	0	0	1	0
38	(Brazil)	MF	Pedrinho	2	0	0	0	1	0	1	0	4	0
44	(Ukraine)	DF	Viktor Korniyenko	1	0	0	0	0	0	0	0	1	0
77	(Ukraine)	DF	Valeriy Bondar	1	0	0	0	0	0	0	0	1	0
81	(Ukraine)	GK	Anatoliy Trubin	0	0	0	0	0	0	1	0	1	0
99	(Brazil)	MF	Fernando	2	0	0	0	0	0	2	0	4	0
Players who suspended their contracts:
3	(Brazil)	DF	Vitão	0	0	0	0	0	0	2	0	2	0
14	(Brazil)	MF	Tetê	3	0	0	0	0	0	1	0	4	0
Players away on loan:
7	(Brazil)	MF	Maycon	1	0	0	0	0	0	1	0	2	0
45	(Ukraine)	FW	Danylo Sikan	2	0	0	0	0	0	0	0	2	0
Players who left Shakhtar Donetsk during the season:
9	(Brazil)	FW	Dentinho	0	0	0	0	0	0	1	0	1	0
11	(Ukraine)	MF	Marlos	2	0	0	0	0	0	0	0	2	0
21	(Brazil)	MF	Alan Patrick	1	0	0	0	1	0	1	0	3	0
			TOTALS	30	2	1	0	4	0	19	0	54	2
