= Viktor Korniyenko =

Ukrainian footballer (born 1999)

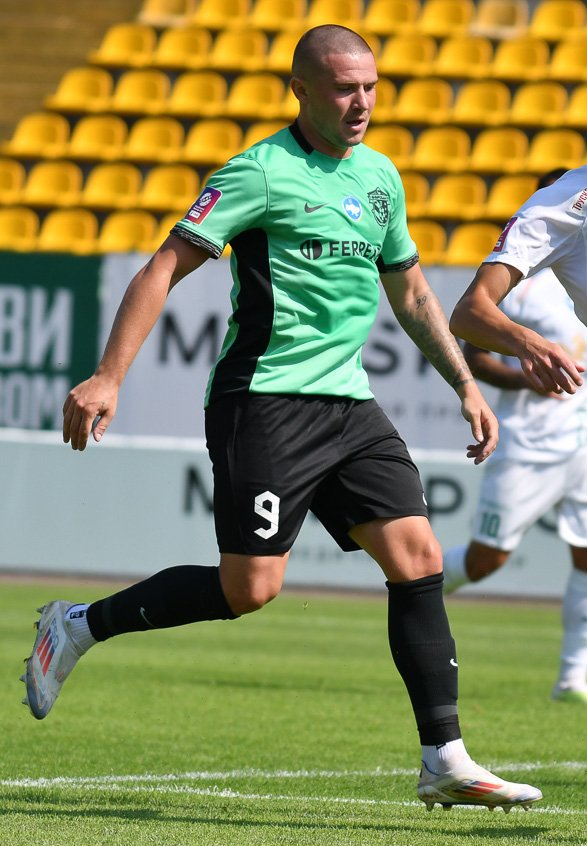

Personal information
- Full name: Viktor Valeriyovych Korniyenko
- Date of birth: 14 February 1999 (age 27)
- Place of birth: Poltava, Ukraine
- Height: 1.75 m (5 ft 9 in)
- Position: Defender

Team information
- Current team: Shakhtar Donetsk

Youth career
- 2011–2012: Vorskla Poltava
- 2013–2014: Illichivets Mariupol
- 2014: Ternopil
- 2015–2016: Illichivets Mariupol

Senior career*
Years	Team	Apps	(Gls)
2016–	Shakhtar Donetsk	22	(1)
2019–2020	→ Mariupol (loan)	19	(1)
2023–2025	→ Vorskla Poltava (loan)	27	(2)

International career^{‡}
2016–2017	Ukraine U18	4	(0)
2017–2018	Ukraine U19	14	(2)
2018–2019	Ukraine U20	10	(0)
2019–2020	Ukraine U21	4	(0)
2021–	Ukraine	2	(1)
Medal record
Men's football
Representing Ukraine
UEFA European Under-19 Championship
Bronze medal – third place	2018 Finland
FIFA U-20 World Cup
Winner	2019 Poland
- * Club domestic league appearances and goals as of 31 December 2024 ‡ National team caps and goals as of 9 October 2021

Viktor Valeriyovych Korniyenko (Ukrainian: Ві́ктор Вале́рійович Корніє́нко; born 14 February 1999) is a Ukrainian professional footballer who plays as a defender for Shakhtar Donetsk in the Ukrainian Premier League.

== Career ==
Born in the Poltava Oblast, Korniyenko began to play with Vorskla Poltava youth sports school system and after continued in the different Ukrainian youth sportive schools.

He made his début for FC Mariupol in the Ukrainian Premier League as a starting squad player in a drawing match against FC Karpaty Lviv on 11 August 2019 and was substituted in the second-half.

== International career ==
Korniyenko was a part of the Ukraine national under-20 football team that won the 2019 FIFA U-20 World Cup. He played one of the key roles in Ukraine's success, appearing in all 7 of his team's matches (6 of them without substitutions).

He made his Ukraine national football team debut on 8 September 2021 in a friendly against the Czech Republic, a 1–1 away draw. He scored Ukraine's goal.

== International goal ==
Scores and results list Ukraine's goal tally first.

No	Date	Venue	Opponent	Score	Result	Competition
1.	8 September 2021	Doosan Arena, Plzeň, Czech Republic	Czech Republic	1–0	1–1	Friendly match

== Personal life ==
Korniyenko is married to his wife, Arina. They have one daughter.

== Career statistics ==
=== Club ===
As of 4 November 2022

Appearances and goals by club, season and competition
Club	Season	League			National Cup		Continental		Other		Total	
Club	Season	Division	Apps	Goals	Apps	Goals	Apps	Goals	Apps	Goals	Apps	Goals
Mariupol (loan)	2019–20	Ukrainian Premier League	19	1	3	0	1 (Note: Appearances in UEFA Europa League)	0	–		23	1
Shakhtar Donetsk	2020–21	Ukrainian Premier League	11	0	1	0	4 (Note: Three appearances in UEFA Champions League, one in UEFA Europa League)	0	–		16	0
Shakhtar Donetsk	2021–22	Ukrainian Premier League	10	1	1	0	2 (Note: Appearances in UEFA Champions League)	0	0	0	13	1
Shakhtar Donetsk	Total		21	1	2	0	6	0	0	0	29	1
Career total			40	2	5	0	7	0	0	0	52	2

== Honours ==
=== International ===
Ukraine U20

- FIFA U-20 World Cup: 2019

=== Orders ===
Order of Merit, 3rd Class
