= Fernando (footballer, born March 1999) =

Brazilian footballer

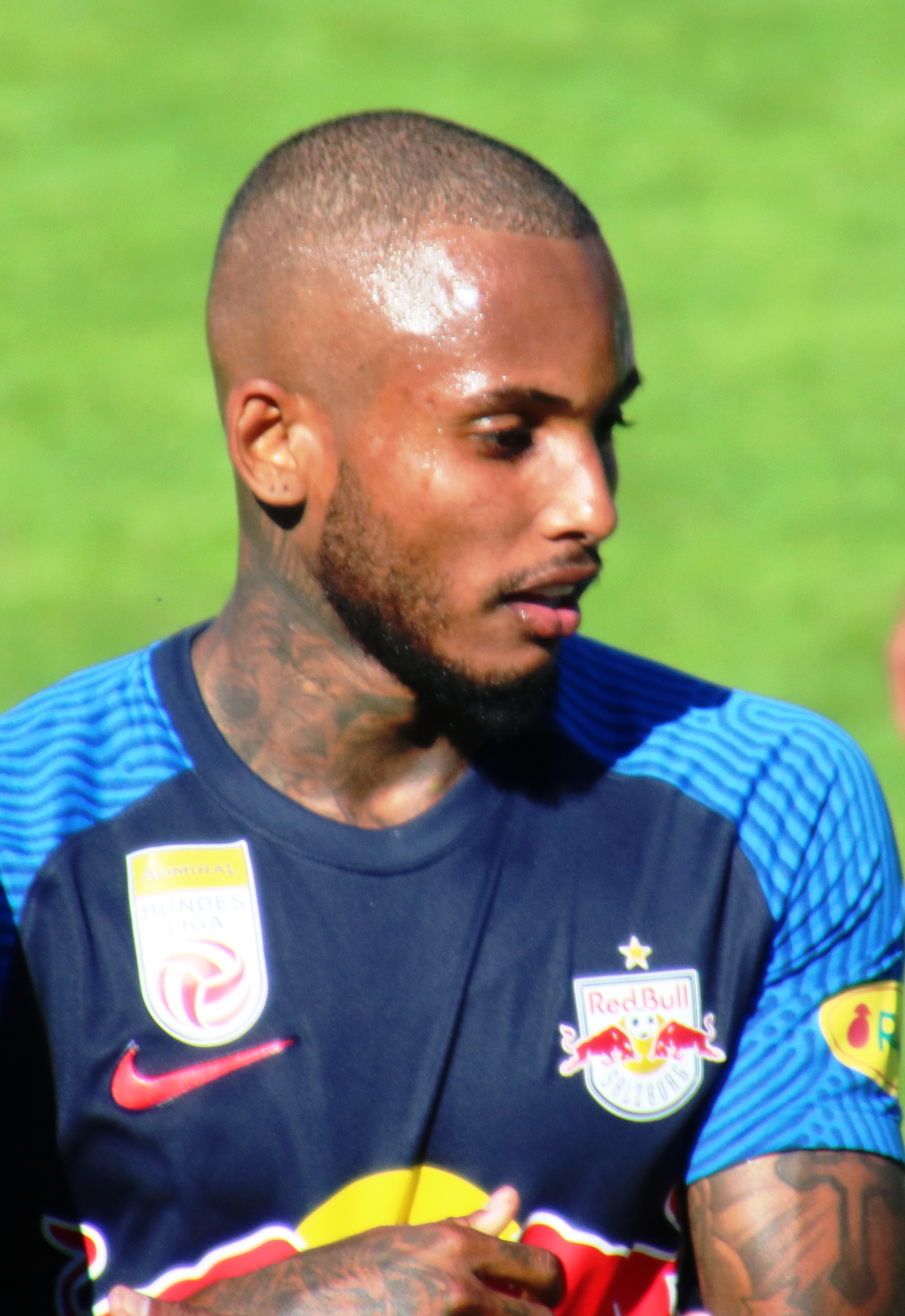
- Fernando with Red Bull Salzburg in 2022

Personal information
- Full name: Fernando dos Santos Pedro
- Date of birth: 1 March 1999 (age 27)
- Place of birth: Belo Horizonte, Brazil
- Height: 1.76 m (5 ft 9 in)
- Position: Forward

Team information
- Current team: Red Bull Bragantino
- Number: 11

Youth career
- Palmeiras

Senior career*
Years	Team	Apps	(Gls)
2017–2018	Palmeiras	2	(1)
2018–2022	Shakhtar Donetsk	51	(9)
2019	→ Sporting CP (loan)	0	(0)
2022–2025	Red Bull Salzburg	20	(10)
2025–	Red Bull Bragantino	25	(1)

International career^{‡}
2018	Brazil U20	2	(0)
- * Club domestic league appearances and goals as of 7 April 2026 ‡ National team caps and goals as of 5 June 2019

Fernando dos Santos Pedro (born 1 March 1999), commonly known as Fernando, is a Brazilian footballer who plays as a forward for Red Bull Bragantino.

== Career ==
=== Club ===
On 21 April 2022, Red Bull Salzburg announced the signing of Fernando from Shakhtar Donetsk on a contract until 30 June 2027, with the Brazilian joining the club to train before the transfer takes effect at the end of the 2021–22.

On 5 January 2025, Fernando returned to Brazil and signed a three-year contract with Red Bull Bragantino.

== Career statistics ==
=== Club ===
As of match played 7 April 2024

Club	Season	League			Cup (Note: Includes Ukrainian Cup, Austrian Cup)		Continental		Other		Total	
Club	Season	Division	Apps	Goals	Apps	Goals	Apps	Goals	Apps	Goals	Apps	Goals
Palmeiras	2017	Série A	1	0	0	0	0	0	0	0	1	0
Palmeiras	2018	Série A	0	0	0	0	0	0	1 (Note: Appearance in Campeonato Paulista)	1	1	1
Palmeiras	Total		1	0	0	0	0	0	1	1	2	1
Shakhtar Donetsk	2018–19	Ukrainian Premier League	18	2	1	0	2 (Note: Appearances in UEFA Champions League)	0	1 (Note: Appearance in Ukrainian Super Cup)	0	22	2
Shakhtar Donetsk	2019–20	Ukrainian Premier League	9	1	0	0	1 (Note: Appearance in UEFA Europa League)	0	0	0	10	1
Shakhtar Donetsk	2020–21	Ukrainian Premier League	17	1	1	0	4 (Note: Two appearances in UEFA Champions League, two appearances in UEFA Europa League)	0	1	0	23	1
Shakhtar Donetsk	2021–22	Ukrainian Premier League	7	5	1	1	6	2	0	0	14	8
Shakhtar Donetsk	Total		51	9	3	1	13	2	2	0	69	12
Red Bull Salzburg	2022–23	Austrian Bundesliga	9	6	2	0	2 (Note: One appearance in UEFA Champions League, two appearances in UEFA Europa League)	0	0	0	13	6
Red Bull Salzburg	2023–24	Austrian Bundesliga	11	4	2	2	1	0	0	0	14	6
Red Bull Salzburg	Total		20	10	4	2	3	0	0	0	27	12
Career total			72	19	7	3	16	2	3	1	98	25

== Honours ==
=== Club ===
Shakhtar Donetsk

- Ukrainian Premier League: 2018–19, 2019–20
- Ukrainian Cup: 2018–19
- Ukrainian Super Cup: 2021
