= Joyskim Dawa =

Cameroonian professional footballer (born 1996)

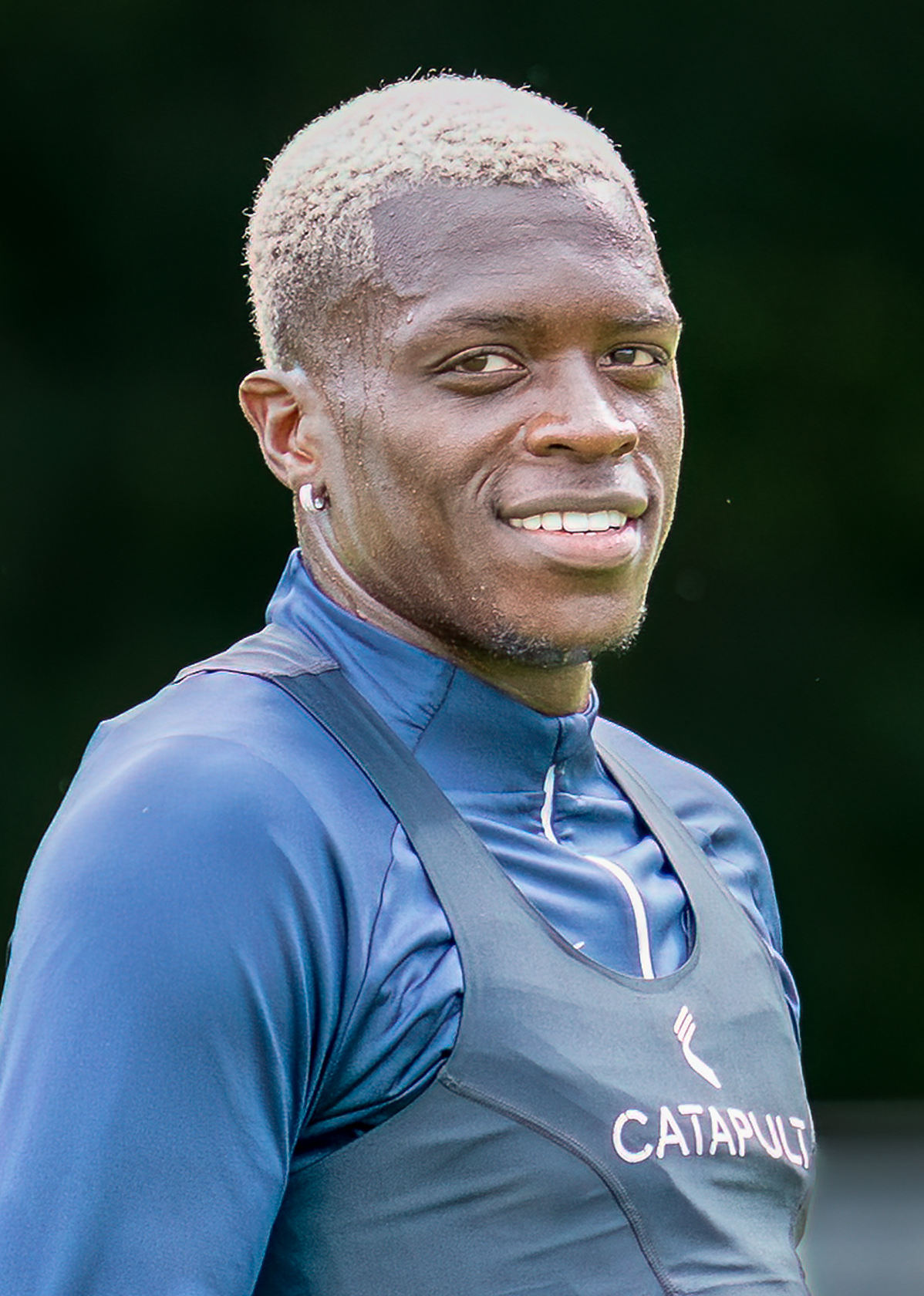
- Dawa with FCSB in 2023

Personal information
- Full name: Joyskim Aurélien Dawa Tchakonte
- Date of birth: April 9, 1996 (age 30)
- Place of birth: Colombes, France
- Height: 1.95 m (6 ft 5 in)
- Position: Centre-back

Team information
- Current team: FCSB
- Number: 5

Youth career
- 2011–2014: Avranches
- 2014–2016: Monaco

Senior career*
Years	Team	Apps	(Gls)
2016–2018	Gil Vicente	12	(1)
2018–2020	Mariupol	39	(0)
2020–2021	Valmiera	18	(2)
2021–2022	Botoșani	30	(4)
2022–	FCSB	122	(8)

International career^{‡}
2018–	Cameroon	10	(0)
- * Club domestic league appearances and goals as of 22 November 2026 ‡ National team caps and goals as of 19 March 2025

Joyskim Aurélien Dawa Tchakonte (born 9 April 1996) is a professional footballer who plays as a centre-back for Liga I club FCSB. Born in France, he plays for the Cameroon national team.

== Club career ==
On 2 February 2018, Dawa signed for Mariupol of the Ukrainian Premier League.

On 22 June 2022, Dawa joined Liga I side FCSB for an undisclosed fee.

== International career ==
Dawa made his debut for the Cameroon national team in a goalless draw with Malawi in the Africa Cup of Nations qualifiers, on 16 October 2018.

== Career statistics ==
=== Club ===
As of match played 22 November 2026

Appearances and goals by club, season and competition
Club	Season	League			National cup (Note: Includes Ukrainian Cup, Cupa României)		Europe		Other		Total	
Club	Season	Division	Apps	Goals	Apps	Goals	Apps	Goals	Apps	Goals	Apps	Goals
Mariupol	2017–18	Ukrainian Premier League	10	0	1	0	—		—		11	0
Mariupol	2018–19	Ukrainian Premier League	8	0	1	0	3 (Note: Appearances in UEFA Europa League)	0	—		12	0
Mariupol	2019–20	Ukrainian Premier League	21	0	3	0	1	0	—		25	0
Mariupol	Total		39	0	5	0	4	0	—		48	0
Valmiera	2020	Latvian First League	4	0	0	0	—		—		4	0
Valmiera	2021	Latvian First League	14	2	—		2 (Note: Appearances in UEFA Europa Conference League)	0	—		16	2
Valmiera	Total		18	2	0	0	2	0	—		20	2
Botoșani	2021–22	Liga I	30	4	1	0	—		1 (Note: Appearances in Liga I European play-offs)	0	32	4
FCSB	2022–23	Liga I	35	3	0	0	11	2	—		46	5
FCSB	2023–24	Liga I	36	3	2	0	4	0	—		42	3
FCSB	2024–25	Liga I	27	1	1	0	16 (Note: Five appearances and two goals in UEFA Champions League, eleven appearances and one goal in UEFA Europa League)	3	1 (Note: Appearance in Supercupa României)	0	45	4
FCSB	2025–26	Liga I	10	0	1	0	1	0	2	2	14	2
FCSB	2026–27	Liga I	14	1	2	0	2	0	—		18	1
FCSB	Total		122	8	6	0	34	5	3	2	165	15
Career total			208	14	12	0	40	5	4	2	264	21

=== International ===
As of match played 19 March 2025

Appearances and goals by national team and year
National team	Year	Apps	Goals
Cameroon	2018	1	0
Cameroon	2019	5	0
Cameroon	2020	0	0
Cameroon	2021	3	0
Cameroon	2025	1	0
Total		10	0

== Honours ==
FCSB

- Liga I: 2023–24, 2024–25
- Supercupa României: 2024, 2025

Individual

- Liga I Team of the Season: 2023–24
