= Andriy Kulakov =

Ukrainian footballer

Personal information
- Full name: Andriy Andriyovych Kulakov
- Date of birth: 28 April 1999 (age 27)
- Place of birth: Verkhnobohdanivka, Luhansk Oblast, Ukraine
- Height: 1.84 m (6 ft 0 in)
- Position: Centre-forward

Team information
- Current team: Oleksandriya
- Number: 10

Youth career
- 2012–2016: Metalist Kharkiv

Senior career*
Years	Team	Apps	(Gls)
2016–2023	Shakhtar Donetsk	0	(0)
2019–2022	→ Mariupol (loan)	44	(9)
2022	→ Tuzlaspor (loan)	4	(0)
2023–	Oleksandriya	67	(2)

International career^{‡}
2015–2016	Ukraine U17	9	(2)
2016–2017	Ukraine U18	4	(2)
2016–2019	Ukraine U19	9	(1)
2019	Ukraine U20	2	(0)
Medal record
Men's football
Representing Ukraine
UEFA European Under-19 Championship
Bronze medal – third place	2018 Finland
- * Club domestic league appearances and goals as of 24 December 2025 ‡ National team caps and goals as of 22 August 2022

Andriy Andriyovych Kulakov (Ukrainian: Андрій Андрійович Кулаков; born 28 April 1999) is a Ukrainian professional footballer who plays as a centre-forward for Oleksandriya.

== Career ==
Kulakov is a product of Metalist Kharkiv academy.

He played in Ukrainian Youth Football League in 2012-2016 for Metalist Kharkiv. Since 2016 he played in Ukrainian Premier League Reserves for U-19 and U-21 teams of Shakhtar Donetsk, to which he moved in 2016.

Kulakov has been a scorer for Shakhtar Donetsk youth squad in the UEFA Youth League in 2017–18 and 2018–19 seasons. He also became the top-scorer in the 2018–19 Ukrainian Premier League Under-21 competitions.

== Career statistics ==
=== Club ===
As of 3 November 2021

Appearances and goals by club, season and competition
Club	Season	League			National Cup		Continental		Other		Total	
Club	Season	Division	Apps	Goals	Apps	Goals	Apps	Goals	Apps	Goals	Apps	Goals
Mariupol (loan)	2019–20	Ukrainian Premier League	13	0	2	1	—		—		15	1
Mariupol (loan)	2020–21	Ukrainian Premier League	20	3	1	0	—		—		21	3
Mariupol (loan)	2021–22	Ukrainian Premier League	11	6	1	0	—		—		12	6
Mariupol (loan)	Total		44	9	4	1	—		—		48	10
Career total			44	9	4	1	—		—		48	10
