= Illya Putrya =

Ukrainian footballer

Personal information
- Full name: Illya Hermanovych Putrya
- Date of birth: 15 May 1998 (age 28)
- Place of birth: Berdiansk, Ukraine
- Height: 1.80 m (5 ft 11 in)
- Position: Defender

Team information
- Current team: Bukovyna Chernivtsi (on loan from LNZ Cherkasy)
- Number: 22

Youth career
- 200?–2011: Azovstal Mariupol
- 2011–2017: Shakhtar Donetsk

Senior career*
| Years | Team | Apps | (Gls) |
| 2017–2018 | Shakhtar Donetsk | 0 | (0) |
| 2018–2020 | Mariupol | 12 | (2) |
| 2020–2024 | Chornomorets Odesa | 88 | (8) |
| 2024– | LNZ Cherkasy | 33 | (3) |
| 2026– | → Bukovyna Chernivtsi (loan) | 0 | (0) |

International career^{‡}
| 2019 | Ukraine U21 | 3 | (0) |
- * Club domestic league appearances and goals as of 11 July 2026 ‡ National team caps and goals as of 27 July 2019

Illya Hermanovych Putrya (Ukrainian: Ілля Германович Путря; born 15 May 1998) is a Ukrainian professional footballer who plays as a defender for Ukrainian Premier League side Bukovyna Chernivtsi , on loan from LNZ Cherkasy.

== Career ==
Putrya is a product of Azovstal Mariupol and Shakhtar Donetsk academies.

He made his début for Mariupol in the Ukrainian Premier League against Karpaty Lviv on 17 March 2019.

On 4 September 2020, Putrya joined Ukrainian First League side Chornomorets Odesa.

On 1 July 2024, Putrya joined Ukrainian Premier League side LNZ Cherkasy.

On 1 July 2026, Putrya joined Ukrainian Premier League side Bukovyna Chernivtsi on a loan deal till June 30, 2027.

== Personal life ==
His father, Herman Putrya, also was a professional footballer who played for Metalurh Zaporizhzhia, Zorya Luhansk and then Metalurh Mariupol.
