= Serhiy Chobotenko =

Ukrainian footballer (born 1997)

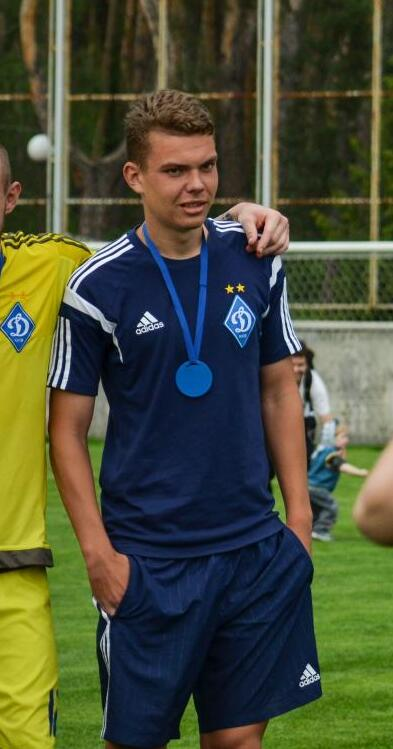

Personal information
- Full name: Serhiy Andriyovych Chobotenko
- Date of birth: 16 January 1997 (age 29)
- Place of birth: Zaporizhzhia, Ukraine
- Height: 1.93 m (6 ft 4 in)
- Position: Centre back

Team information
- Current team: Polissya Zhytomyr
- Number: 44

Youth career
- 2004–2012: Metalurh Zaporizhzhia
- 2012–2014: Dynamo Kyiv

Senior career*
Years	Team	Apps	(Gls)
2014–2017	Dynamo Kyiv	0	(0)
2017–2019	Shakhtar Donetsk	0	(0)
2018–2019	→ Mariupol (loan)	22	(0)
2019–2022	Mariupol	55	(3)
2022	Dnipro-1	0	(0)
2022–2023	Kolos Kovalivka	26	(2)
2023–	Polissya Zhytomyr	76	(2)

International career^{‡}
	Ukraine U16	?	(?)
2013–2014	Ukraine U17	12	(0)
2015	Ukraine U18	4	(1)
2015–2015	Ukraine U19	5	(1)
2016	Ukraine U20	2	(0)
- * Club domestic league appearances and goals as of 3 June 2026 ‡ National team caps and goals as of 22 July 2019

Serhiy Andriyovych Chobotenko (Ukrainian: Сергій Андрійович Чоботенко; born 16 January 1997) is a Ukrainian professional footballer who plays as a centre back for Ukrainian Premier League club Polissya Zhytomyr.

== Career ==
Chobotenko is product of FC Metalurh Zaporizhya youth team system. His first trainer was Mykola Syenovalov.

He made his debut for FC Mariupol in the Ukrainian Premier League in an away match against FC Zorya Luhansk on 22 July 2018.
