= Kyrylo Romanyuk =

Ukrainian footballer

Personal information
- Full name: Kyrylo Serhiyovych Romanyuk
- Date of birth: 21 March 2001 (age 25)
- Place of birth: Dnipropetrovsk, Ukraine
- Height: 1.85 m (6 ft 1 in)
- Position: Defender

Team information
- Current team: Lokomotyv Kyiv

Youth career
- 2014–2017: Dnipro
- 2017–2019: Shakhtar Donetsk

Senior career*
Years	Team	Apps	(Gls)
2019–2021	Mariupol	1	(0)
2021	Feniks Synelnykove (amateurs)	0	(0)
2021–	Lokomotyv Kyiv (amateurs)	3	(0)

International career^{‡}
2016	Ukraine U15	3	(0)
2017	Ukraine U16	4	(0)
- * Club domestic league appearances and goals as of 25 November 2021 ‡ National team caps and goals as of 19 September 2021

Kyrylo Serhiyovych Romanyuk (Ukrainian: Кирило Сергійович Романюк; born 21 March 2001) is a Ukrainian amateur football defender who plays for Lokomotyv Kyiv.

== Career ==
Romanyuk is a product mainly of Dnipro and Shakhtar Donetsk youth sportive school systems.

He made his début for FC Mariupol in the Ukrainian Premier League as a substituted player in the additional time of a match against defending champion FC Shakhtar Donetsk on 1 December 2019.

== Personal life ==
His twin brother Bohdan is also a professional footballer.
