= Artem Pospyelov =

Ukrainian footballer

Personal information
- Full name: Artem Andriyovych Pospyelov
- Date of birth: 11 January 1998 (age 28)
- Place of birth: Berdychiv, Ukraine
- Height: 1.90 m (6 ft 3 in)
- Position: Goalkeeper

Team information
- Current team: Polissya Zhytomyr
- Number: 33

Youth career
- 2009–2011: Darnytsia Kyiv
- 2011–2017: Shakhtar Donetsk
- 2017: → Arsenal Kyiv (loan)

Senior career*
Years	Team	Apps	(Gls)
2017–2021	Mariupol	1	(0)
2021	→ Avanhard Kramatorsk (loan)	14	(0)
2021–2022	Kramatorsk	18	(0)
2022–	Polissya Zhytomyr	1	(0)
2023–	Polissya-2 Zhytomyr	7	(0)
- * Club domestic league appearances and goals as of 28 October 2024

Artem Andriyovych Pospyelov (Ukrainian: Артем Андрійович Поспєлов; born 11 January 1998) is a Ukrainian professional footballer who plays as a goalkeeper for Polissya Zhytomyr.

== Career ==
=== Early years ===
Pospyelov was born in Berdychiv, and at the age of 7 began to play football in his native town, where he joined the local youth sportive school. His first coach was Serhiy Kopytko. He continued his football formation at Darnytsia Kyiv and at Shakhtar Donetsk academy.

=== Mariupol ===
In July 2017, he moved to the Ukrainian Premier League side Mariupol and played for it in the Ukrainian Premier League Reserves and Under 19 Championship during two seasons. In August 2019 he was promoted to the main squad to play in the Ukrainian Premier League. Pospyelov made his debut in the Ukrainian Premier League as a starting squad player on 19 July 2020, playing in a winning away match against Lviv.
