= Volodymyr Boyko Stadium =

Multi-purpose stadium in Mariupol, Donetsk Oblast, Ukraine

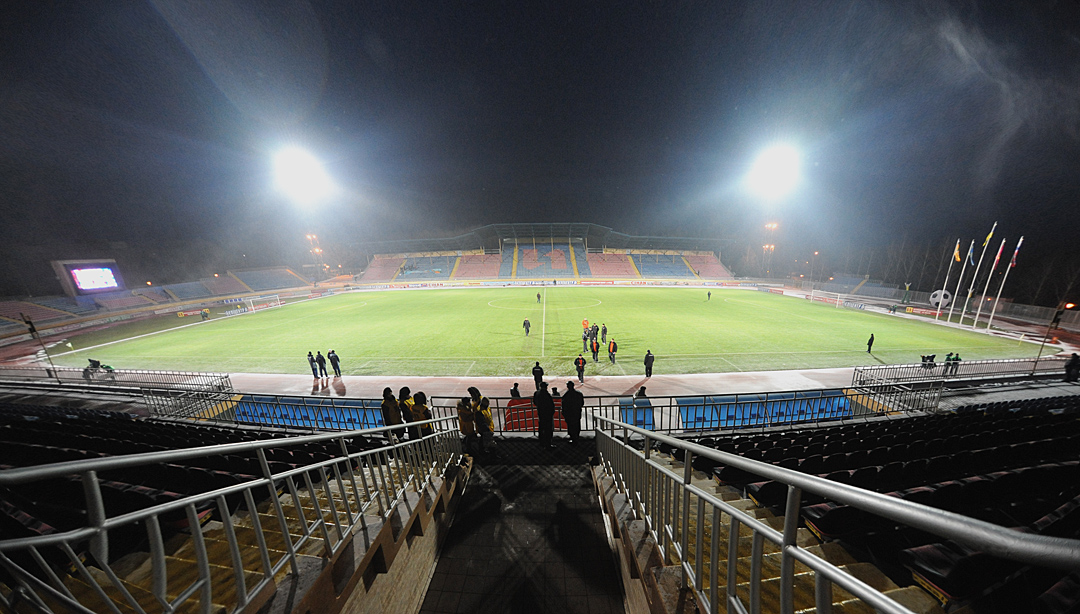
- Interactive map of Volodymyr Boyko Stadium
- Former names: Novator Stadium (1956–2001); Illichivets Stadium (2001–2018)
- Location: Mariupol, Donetsk Oblast, Ukraine
- Coordinates: 47°8′37.40″N 37°33′30″E
- Owner: FC Mariupol
- Capacity: 12,680 (football)
- Surface: Grass

Construction
- Opened: 1956

Tenants
- Mariupol; Ukraine (women)

Volodymyr Boyko Stadium(Ukrainian: Стадіон імені Володимира Бойка) is a multi-purpose stadium in Mariupol, Donetsk Oblast, Ukraine. It is located in a local Petrovskyi Park which is located along the highway Mariupol–Donetsk (H20).

Built in 1956, it was originally known as Novator Stadium (Новатор). In 2001, it was renovated by Illich Steel and Iron Works and changed its name to Illichivets Stadium (Іллічівець). the stadium then changed its name to Volodymyr Boyko Stadium to honor Hero of Ukraine, Volodymyr Boyko.

It was until 2022 used mostly for football matches, and is the home of FC Mariupol. The stadium holds 12,680 people. Often the stadium is used by the national women's football team.

Since the start of the Russian occupation of Mariupol during the 2022 Russian invasion of Ukraine, the stadium buildings have been damaged by shelling and looted, and the grass pitch has withered due to a lack of maintenance. "As the conflict resumed in February 2022 Mariupol was one of the first cities targeted by severe Russian shelling," according to a 2024 report about the casualties of the 2022 Russian Invasion of Ukraine, "and Volodymyr Boyko Stadium suffered irreparable damage."
