= Maksym Chekh =

Ukrainian footballer

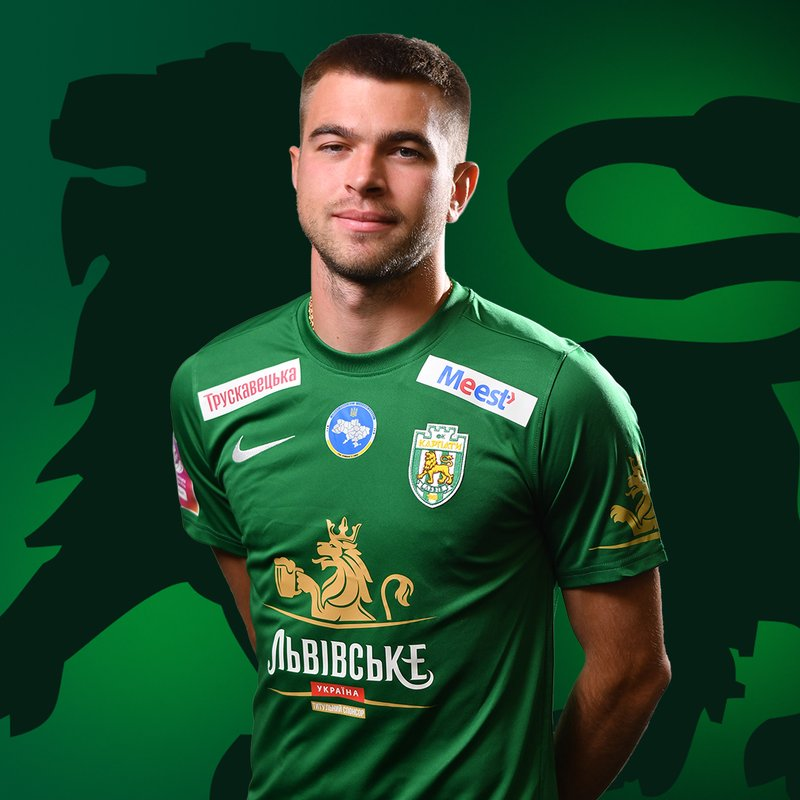

Personal information
- Full name: Maksym Serhiyovych Chekh
- Date of birth: 3 January 1999 (age 27)
- Place of birth: Krasna Poliana, Ukraine
- Height: 1.75 m (5 ft 9 in)
- Position: Midfielder

Team information
- Current team: Obolon Kyiv
- Number: 6

Youth career
- 2008–2018: Shakhtar Donetsk

Senior career*
Years	Team	Apps	(Gls)
2018–2023	Shakhtar Donetsk	0	(0)
2019–2021	→ Mariupol (loan)	54	(1)
2022–2023	→ Sabail (loan)	29	(1)
2023–2025	Karpaty Lviv	18	(1)
2025–	Obolon Kyiv	22	(1)

International career^{‡}
2015–2016	Ukraine U17	9	(0)
2017	Ukraine U18	2	(0)
2017–2018	Ukraine U19	2	(0)
2018–2019	Ukraine U20	8	(0)
2019–2020	Ukraine U21	11	(0)
Medal record
Men's football
Representing Ukraine
UEFA European Under-19 Championship
Bronze medal – third place	2018 Finland
FIFA U-20 World Cup
Winner	2019 Poland
- * Club domestic league appearances and goals as of 3 June 2026 ‡ National team caps and goals as of 13 August 2022

Maksym Serhiyovych Chekh (Ukrainian: Макси́м Сергі́йович Чех; born 3 January 1999) is a Ukrainian professional footballer who plays as a midfielder for Obolon Kyiv.

== Career ==
Born in Velyka Novosilka Raion, Donetsk Oblast, Chekh is a product of Shakhtar Donetsk youth system.

He made his debut for FC Mariupol in the Ukrainian Premier League against FC Kolos Kovalivka on 30 July 2019.

== International career ==
Chekh was part of the Ukraine national under-20 football team that won the 2019 FIFA U-20 World Cup, appearing in all seven of his team's matches.

== Honours ==
=== International ===
Ukraine U20

- FIFA U-20 World Cup: 2019
