= Stanislav Biblyk =

Ukrainian footballer

Personal information
- Full name: Stanislav Olehovych Biblyk
- Date of birth: 17 August 2001 (age 25)
- Place of birth: Yenakiieve, Ukraine
- Height: 1.87 m (6 ft 2 in)
- Position: Striker

Team information
- Current team: Tekstilshchik Ivanovo
- Number: 77

Youth career
- 2013–2014: Azovstal-2 Mariupol
- 2014–2020: Shakhtar Donetsk

Senior career*
Years	Team	Apps	(Gls)
2020–2022	Shakhtar Donetsk	0	(0)
2020	→ Mariupol (loan)	3	(0)
2021–2022	→ Akron Tolyatti (loan)	5	(0)
2022–2023	Aluston-YUBK	0	(0)
2023	Zvezda St. Petersburg	9	(5)
2023–2024	Chelyabinsk	23	(6)
2024–2026	Chayka Peschanokopskoye	45	(10)
2026–	Tekstilshchik Ivanovo	2	(0)

International career^{‡}
2017	Ukraine U16	6	(2)
2017	Ukraine U17	4	(1)
2018	Ukraine U18	1	(0)
- * Club domestic league appearances and goals as of 4 September 2026 ‡ National team caps and goals as of 2 September 2022

Stanislav Olehovych Biblyk (Ukrainian: Станіслав Олегович Біблик; born 17 August 2001) is a Ukrainian professional football striker who plays for Russian club Tekstilshchik Ivanovo.

== Career ==
Biblyk is a product of the Azovstal-2 Mariupol and Shahktar Donetsk youth sportive schools, who played in the Ukrainian Premier League Reserves, and signed a loan contract with FC Mariupol in the Ukrainian Premier League in January 2020.

He continued to play in the Ukrainian Premier League Reserves and made his debut for FC Mariupol in the Ukrainian Premier League in a losing away match against FC Oleksandriya as a substituted second half-time player on 22 August 2020.
