= Dmytro Topalov =

Ukrainian footballer

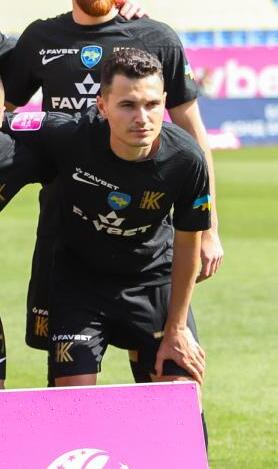

Personal information
- Full name: Dmytro Eduardovych Topalov
- Date of birth: 12 March 1998 (age 28)
- Place of birth: Blyzhnie, Donetsk Oblast, Ukraine
- Height: 1.76 m (5 ft 9 in)
- Position: Left winger

Team information
- Current team: Aktobe
- Number: 12

Youth career
- 2006–2017: Shakhtar Donetsk

Senior career*
Years	Team	Apps	(Gls)
2017–2025	Shakhtar Donetsk	16	(0)
2019–2022	→ Mariupol (loan)	63	(10)
2024	→ Kolos Kovalivka (loan)	14	(0)
2024–2025	→ LNZ Cherkasy (loan)	16	(2)
2026–	Aktobe	19	(0)

International career^{‡}
2015	Ukraine U17	3	(0)
2015–2016	Ukraine U18	7	(2)
2016–2017	Ukraine U19	6	(0)
2018–2020	Ukraine U21	15	(3)
- * Club domestic league appearances and goals as of 1 November 2026 ‡ National team caps and goals as of 28 January 2024

Dmytro Eduardovych Topalov (Ukrainian: Дмитро Едуардович Топалов; born 12 March 1998) is a Ukrainian professional footballer who plays as a left winger for Aktobe in the Kazakhstan Premier League.

== Career ==
Born in Volnovakha Raion, Donetsk Oblast, Topalov trained in the Shakhtar Donetsk youth academy beginning at age 8.

He made his debut for FC Mariupol in the Ukrainian Premier League as a second-half substitute against FC Kolos Kovalivka on 30 July 2019.

On 22 August 2024, Topalov moved on loan to LNZ Cherkasy.
