= 2020–21 FC Mariupol season =

FC Mariupol
2020–21 season
- President: Tariq Mehmood Chaudhry
- Manager: Ostap Markevych
- Stadium: Volodymyr Boiko Stadium
- Ukrainian Premier League: 11th
- Ukrainian Cup: Round of 16 (1/8)
- Top goalscorer: League: Artem Bondarenko, (8); All: Artem Bondarenko, (8)
- Highest home attendance: 2,348 (vs Kolos Kovalivka, 14 March 2021)
- Lowest home attendance: 0
- Average home league attendance: 668
Home colours	Away colours

The 2020–21 season was 21st season in the top Ukrainian football league for FC Mariupol. Mariupol competed in Premier League and Ukrainian Cup.

== Players ==
=== Squad information ===
As of 30 June 2021

Squad no.	Name	Nationality	Position	Date of birth (age)
Goalkeepers
1	Yevhen Halchuk	(Ukraine)	GK	5 March 1992 (aged 29)
30	Pavlo Kravtsov ^{List B}	(Ukraine)	GK	19 January 2000 (aged 21)
31	Oleh Kudryk	(Ukraine)	GK	17 October 1996 (aged 24)
Defenders
2	Oleksiy Bykov	(Ukraine)	DF	29 March 1998 (aged 23)
4	Serhiy Chobotenko	(Ukraine)	DF	16 January 1997 (aged 24)
15	Kyrylo Melichenko ^{List B}	(Ukraine)	DF	7 June 1999 (aged 22)
19	Ihor Tyschenko	(Ukraine)	DF	11 May 1998 (aged 23)
20	Oleksiy Kashchuk ^{List B} (on loan from Shakhtar Donetsk)	(Ukraine)	DF	29 June 2000 (aged 21)
35	Mark Mampassi ^{List B} (on loan from Shakhtar Donetsk)	(Ukraine)	DF	12 March 2003 (aged 18)
36	Kyrylo Romaniuk ^{List B}	(Ukraine)	DF	21 March 2001 (aged 20)
37	Nazariy Muravskyi ^{List B} (on loan from Shakhtar Donetsk)	(Ukraine)	DF	3 February 2000 (aged 21)
39	Danylo Dmytriyev ^{List B}	(Ukraine)	DF	22 October 2002 (aged 18)
42	Mykyta Fursenko ^{List B}	(Ukraine)	DF	1 October 2002 (aged 18)
44	Danylo Sahutkin ^{List B}	(Ukraine)	DF	19 April 1996 (aged 25)
47	Mykyta Kozytskyi ^{List B}	(Ukraine)	DF	26 January 2002 (aged 19)
49	Illya Ukhan ^{List B}	(Ukraine)	DF	1 June 2003 (aged 18)
55	Oleksandr Drambayev ^{List B} (on loan from Shakhtar Donetsk)	(Ukraine)	DF	21 April 2001 (aged 20)
95	Petro Stasyuk	(Ukraine)	DF	24 February 1995 (aged 26)
96	Ihor Kyryukhantsev (on loan from Shakhtar Donetsk)	(Ukraine)	DF	29 January 1996 (aged 25)
Midfielders
6	Maksym Chekh ^{List B} (on loan from Shakhtar Donetsk)	(Ukraine)	MF	3 January 1999 (aged 22)
9	Dmytro Myshnyov	(Ukraine)	MF	26 January 1994 (aged 27)
11	Oleh Ocheretko ^{List B} (on loan from Shakhtar Donetsk)	(Ukraine)	MF	25 May 2003 (aged 18)
14	Anton Baidal ^{List B}	(Ukraine)	MF	8 February 2000 (aged 21)
17	Serhiy Horbunov	(Ukraine)	MF	14 March 1994 (aged 27)
21	Artem Bondarenko ^{List B} (on loan from Shakhtar Donetsk)	(Ukraine)	MF	21 August 2000 (aged 20)
23	Yaroslav Dobrokhotov ^{List B}	(Ukraine)	MF	1 November 2000 (aged 20)
27	Rodion Plaksa ^{List B}	(Ukraine)	MF	22 January 2002 (aged 19)
28	Andriy Vyskrebentsev ^{List B}	(Ukraine)	MF	27 October 2000 (aged 20)
29	Vyacheslav Tankovskyi (on loan from Shakhtar Donetsk)	(Ukraine)	MF	16 August 1995 (aged 25)
34	Mykyta Peterman ^{List B}	(Ukraine)	MF	12 June 1999 (aged 22)
38	Pavlo Shushko ^{List B}	(Ukraine)	MF	7 May 2000 (aged 21)
40	Ivan Mamrosenko ^{List B}	(Ukraine)	MF	27 March 2000 (aged 21)
45	Oleksandr Kozhevnikov ^{List B}	(Ukraine)	MF	18 August 2000 (aged 20)
48	Ivan Koshkosh ^{List B}	(Ukraine)	MF	8 April 2001 (aged 20)
79	Eldar Nuriyev ^{List B}	(Ukraine)	MF	24 March 2002 (aged 19)
77	Andriy Kulakov ^{List B} (on loan from Shakhtar Donetsk)	(Ukraine)	MF	28 April 1999 (aged 22)
Forwards
7	Dmytro Topalov (on loan from Shakhtar Donetsk)	(Ukraine)	FW	12 May 1998 (aged 23)
46	Myroslav Trofymyuk ^{List B}	(Ukraine)	FW	8 April 2001 (aged 20)
99	Danylo Sikan ^{List B} (on loan from Shakhtar Donetsk)	(Ukraine)	FW	16 April 2001 (aged 20)

== Transfers ==
=== In ===
Date	Pos.	Player	Age	Moving from	Type	Fee	Source
Summer
17 August 2020	MF	(Ukraine) Petro Stasyuk	25	(Ukraine) FC Mynai	Transfer	Undisclosed	
8 September 2020	DF	(Ukraine) Vyacheslav Velyev	20	(Ukraine) Chornomorets Odesa	Transfer	Undisclosed	
7 October 2020	GK	(Ukraine) Oleh Kudryk	23	(Ukraine) Shakhtar Donetsk	Transfer	Undisclosed	
31 July 2020	MF	(Ukraine) Vladyslav Buhay	22	(Ukraine) MFC Mykolaiv	Loan return		
31 July 2020	MF	(Ukraine) Ivan Mochevynskyi	22	(Ukraine) Polissya Zhytomyr	Loan return		
5 August 2020	GK	(Ukraine) Oleh Kudryk	23	(Ukraine) Shakhtar Donetsk	Loan		
6 August 2020	MF	(Ukraine) Artem Bondarenko	19	(Ukraine) Shakhtar Donetsk	Loan		
17 September 2020	FW	(Ukraine) Danylo Sikan	19	(Ukraine) Shakhtar Donetsk	Loan		
28 September 2020	MF	(Ukraine) Oleh Ocheretko	17	(Ukraine) Shakhtar Donetsk	Loan		
Winter
1 January 2020	DF	(Ukraine) Kyrylo Melichenko	21	(Ukraine) Shakhtar Donetsk	Transfer	Undisclosed	
6 January 2020	DF	(Ukraine) Danylo Sahutkin	24	(Ukraine) Shakhtar Donetsk	Transfer	Undisclosed	
5 January 2020	DF	(Ukraine) Oleksandr Drambayev	19	(Ukraine) Shakhtar Donetsk	Loan		
11 January 2020	DF	(Ukraine) Mark Mampassi	17	(Ukraine) Shakhtar Donetsk	Loan		

=== Out ===
Date	Pos.	Player	Age	Moving to	Type	Fee	Source
Summer
10 August 2020	DF	(Ukraine) Serhiy Yavorskyi	31	(Ukraine) Vorskla Poltava	Transfer	Free	
20 August 2020	MF	(Ukraine) Valeriy Fedorchuk	31	(Ukraine) Rukh Lviv	Transfer	Free	
22 August 2020	FW	(Ukraine) Ruslan Fomin	34	(Ukraine) Metal Kharkiv	Transfer	Free	
8 September 2020	DF	(Cameroon) Joyskim Dawa	24	(Latvia) Valmiera	Transfer	Undisclosed	
8 September 2020	MF	(Ukraine) Illya Putrya	22	(Ukraine) Chornomorets Odesa	Transfer	Undisclosed	
17 September 2020	MF	(Ukraine) Pavlo Polehenko	25	(Ukraine) Desna Chernihiv	Transfer	Free	
19 September 2020	FW	(Ukraine) Vladyslav Buhay	22	(Ukraine) Chornomorets Odesa	Transfer	Free	
24 September 2020	MF	(Ukraine) Vladyslav Bondar	20	(Ukraine) Avanhard Kramatorsk	Transfer / Loan ?	Undisclosed	
31 July 2020	DF	(Ukraine) Viktor Korniyenko	21	(Ukraine) Shakhtar Donetsk	Loan return		
31 July 2020	FW	(Ukraine) Artem Dudik	23	(Ukraine) Shakhtar Donetsk	Loan return		
1 October 2020	FW	(Ukraine) Danylo Ihnatenko	23	(Ukraine) Shakhtar Donetsk	Loan return		
6 October 2020	GK	(Ukraine) Oleh Kudryk	23	(Ukraine) Shakhtar Donetsk	Loan return		
Summer
1 February 2021	DF	(Ukraine) Vyacheslav Velyev	20	Unattached	Transfer	Free	
31 December 2020	DF	(Ukraine) Danylo Sahutkin	24	(Ukraine) Shakhtar Donetsk	Loan return		
31 December 2020	FW	(Ukraine) Stanislav Biblyk	19	(Ukraine) Shakhtar Donetsk	Loan return		
2 February 2021	GK	(Ukraine) Artem Pospyelov	23	(Ukraine) Avanhard Kramatorsk	Loan		

== Pre-season and friendlies ==
8 August 2020 Friendly	FC Mariupol (Ukraine)	2–1	(Ukraine) Yarud Mariupol	Mariupol
18:00 EEST (UTC+03:00)	Kashchuk 10'; Bykov 22'	Report	Solovyov 64'	Stadium: Mariupol training facility

12 August 2020 Friendly	FC Mariupol (Ukraine)	5–1	(Ukraine) Krystal Kherson	Mariupol
17:30 EEST (UTC+03:00)	Topalov 20'; Horbunov 42'; Bondarenko 49'; Putrya 52'; Kyryukhantsev 65'	Report	Malysh 26'	Stadium: Mariupol training facility

15 August 2020 Friendly	Zorya Luhansk (Ukraine)	2–1	(Ukraine) FC Mariupol	Zaporizhia
17:00 EEST (UTC+03:00)	Lunyov 11'; Perović 88'	Report	Kulakov 15'	Stadium: Torpedo Stadium

9 January 2021 Friendly	FC Mariupol (Ukraine)	1–3	(Czech Republic) Slovan Liberec	Belek, Turkey
15:00 EET (UTC+02:00)	Ocheretko 43'	Report	Rondić 3'; Mikula 30'; Karafiát 33'	Stadium: Spice

16 January 2021 Friendly	FC Mariupol (Ukraine)	2–2	(Poland) Raków Częstochowa	Antalya, Turkey
15:30 EET (UTC+02:00)	Kashchuk 38' (pen.); Tankovskyi 90' (pen.)	Report	Krzyżak 43'; Schwarz 88' (pen.)

21 January 2021 Friendly	FC Mariupol (Ukraine)	4–0	(Kazakhstan) FC Kyzylzhar	Kundu, Turkey
15:30 EET (UTC+02:00)	Myshnyov 23', 41'; Stasyuk 39'; Kulakov 89'	Report		Stadium: Kremlin Palace Sports Center

28 January 2021 Friendly	FC Mariupol (Ukraine)	1–1	(Serbia) Proleter Novi Sad	Kundu, Turkey
15:30 EET (UTC+02:00)	Sikan 44'	Report	Tomovic 18'	Stadium: Kremlin Palace Sports Center

3 February 2021 Friendly	FC Mariupol (Ukraine)	2–2	(Ukraine) Shakhtar Donetsk	Belek, Turkey
10:00 EET (UTC+02:00)	Bondarenko 51'; Kashchuk 67' (pen.)	Report	Konoplyanka 4'; Fernando 90'	Stadium: Regnum sports center

== Competitions ==
=== Overall ===
Competition	First match	Last match	Starting round	Final position	Record							
Competition	First match	Last match	Starting round	Final position	Pld	W	D	L	GF	GA	GD	Win %
Ukrainian Premier League	22 August 2020	9 May 2021	Matchday 1	11th	26	6	8	12	27	41	−14	23.08
Ukrainian Cup	30 September 2020	2 December 2020	Round of 32 (1/16)	Round of 16 (1/8)	2	1	0	1	3	2	+1	50.00
Total					28	7	8	13	30	43	−13	25.00

Last updated: 9 May 2021
Source: Competitions

=== Premier League ===
==== League table ====
Pos	Team	Pld	W	D	L	GF	GA	GD	Pts	Qualification or relegation
9	FC Oleksandriya	26	8	5	13	33	37	−4	29 (Note: Head-to-head goal difference: Lviv +1, Oleksandriya -1)	
10	Rukh Lviv	26	6	10	10	27	39	−12	28	
11	FC Mariupol	26	6	8	12	27	41	−14	26 (Note: Head-to-head points: Mariupol 4, Inhulets 1)	
12	Inhulets Petrove	26	5	11	10	24	39	−15	26	
13	Olimpik Donetsk (R)	26	6	4	16	28	48	−20	22	Relegation to Ukrainian First League

Source: Ukrainian Premier League
Rules for classification: 1) Points; 2) Head-to-head points; 3) Head-to-head goal difference; 4) Head-to-head higher number of goals scored; 5) Goal difference; 6) Higher number of goals scored; 7) Draw or "Golden match" if two teams tied for title (Article 22, paragraph 3).
(R) Relegated

==== Results summary ====
Overall								Home						Away					
Pld	W	D	L	GF	GA	GD	Pts	W	D	L	GF	GA	GD	W	D	L	GF	GA	GD
26	6	8	12	27	41	−14	26	2	3	8	14	24	−10	4	5	4	13	17	−4

Last updated: 9 May 2021.
Source: Competitive matches

==== Results by round ====
Round	1	2	3	4	5	6	7	8	9	10	11	12	13	14	15	16	17	18	19	20	21	22	23	24	25	26
Ground	A	A	A	A	A	A	A	A	A	A	A	H	A	H	H	H	H	H	H	H	H	H	H	H	A	H
Result	L	W	W	D	L	W	D	L	D	D	W	L	L	L	L	D	L	L	D	W	L	D	L	L	D	W
Position	13	9	5	6	7	5	6	7	8	8	6	9	9	9	9	9	9	10	10	9	9	9	10	12	12	11

Updated to match(es) played on 9 May 2021. Source: Competitive matches
A = Away; H = Home; W = Win; D = Draw; L = Loss

==== Matches ====
22 August 2020 1	FC Oleksandriya	4–1	FC Mariupol	Oleksandriya
19:30 EEST (UTC+03:00)	Pashayev (yellow card) 18'; Shastal 45'; Hordiyenko 47'; Myshenko 49'; Bezborodko 90+2'	Report	Kashchuk (yellow card) 4'; Tyschenko (yellow card) 7'; Bykov (yellow card) 11'; Topalov (yellow card) 33'; Ihnatenko (yellow card) 62'; Sahutkin (yellow card) 64'; Myshnyov (yellow card) 74'; Kulakov 82'	Stadium: CSC Nika Stadium; Attendance: 0 Referee: Dmytro Kutakov
Note: Match was played behind closed doors due to quarantine in Ukraine during COVID-19 pandemic.

13 September 2020 2	Zorya Luhansk	0–1	FC Mariupol	Zaporizhia
17:00 EEST (UTC+03:00)	Cvek (yellow card) 11'; Abu Hanna (yellow card) 37'; Vernydub (yellow card) 89'	Report	Chobotenko (yellow card) 40'; Kyryukhantsev (yellow card) 58'; Topalov 61'; Ihnatenko (yellow card) 68' (yellow-red card) 86'	Stadium: Slavutych-Arena; Attendance: 0 Referee: Serhiy Boyko
Note: Match was played behind closed doors due to quarantine in Ukraine during COVID-19 pandemic.

18 September 2020 3	SC Dnipro-1	1–2	FC Mariupol	Dnipro
19:00 EEST (UTC+03:00)	Dubinchak (yellow card) 29'; Svatok (yellow card) 32'; Kravchenko (yellow card) 53'; Di Franco (yellow card) 58'; Khoblenko 60'; Vakulko (yellow card) 90+5'	Report	Bondarenko 26'; Topalov (yellow card) 43'; Sahutkin (yellow card) 55' (yellow-red card) 90+2', (goal) 78'	Stadium: Dnipro-Arena; Attendance: 0 Referee: Dmytro Kryvushkin
Note: Match was played behind closed doors due to quarantine in Ukraine during COVID-19 pandemic.

26 September 2020 4	Vorskla Poltava	0–0	FC Mariupol	Poltava
17:00 EEST (UTC+03:00)	Sklyar (yellow card) 49'; Puclin (yellow card) 90+1'	Report	Bykov (yellow card) 16'; Halchuk (yellow card) 20'; Topalov (yellow card) 53'; Peterman (yellow card) 90+3' (yellow-red card) 90+5'	Stadium: Vorskla Stadium; Attendance: 2,523; Referee: Volodymyr Novokhatniy

3 October 2020 5	Kolos Kovalivka	1–0	FC Mariupol	Kovalivka
19:30 EEST (UTC+03:00)	Petrov (yellow card) 30'; Orikhovskyi 90+4' (pen.)	Report	Chekh (yellow card) 40'	Stadium: Kolos Stadium; Attendance: 1,256; Referee: Viktor Kopiyevskyi

17 October 2020 6	FC Mynai	0–1	FC Mariupol	Uzhhorod
14:00 EEST (UTC+03:00)	Snizhko (yellow card) 34'; Lopyryonok (yellow card) 37'; Matić (yellow card) 66'; Shynder (yellow card) 86'	Report	Stasyuk (yellow card) 20'; Bykov (yellow card) 41'; Bondarenko 90+2' (pen.)	Stadium: Avanhard Stadium; Attendance: 0 Referee: Yevhen Aranovskyi
Note: Match was played behind closed doors due to quarantine in Ukraine during COVID-19 pandemic.

25 October 2020 7	Inhulets Petrove	1–1	FC Mariupol	Kropyvnytskyi
14:00 EET (UTC+02:00)	Balan 6'; Kozak (yellow card) 12'; Bartulović (yellow card) 39'; Lupashko (yellow card) 60'; Kvasnyi (yellow card) 90+5'	Report	Bondarenko 8'; Bykov (yellow card) 35'; Ocheretko (yellow card) 81'; Kulakov (yellow card) 90+5'	Stadium: Zirka Stadium; Attendance: 0 Referee: Dmytro Kryvushkin
Note: Match was played behind closed doors due to quarantine in Ukraine during COVID-19 pandemic.

30 October 2020 8	Shakhtar Donetsk	4–1	FC Mariupol	Kyiv
19:00 EET (UTC+02:00)	Taison 26' (pen.), 75'; Sudakov 44'; Alan Patrick 65' (pen.)	Report	Horbunov 72'	Stadium: NSC Olimpiyskiy; Attendance: 0 Referee: Volodymyr Novokhatniy
Note: Match was played behind closed doors due to quarantine in Ukraine during COVID-19 pandemic.

7 November 2020 9	Olimpik Donetsk	3–3	FC Mariupol	Kyiv
14:00 EET (UTC+02:00)	Benito (yellow card) 33', (goal) 36'; Zaviyskyi (yellow card) 58'; Dramé (yellow card) 62'; Babenko (yellow card) 75'; Politylo 79'; Kargbo 90+5'	Report	Sikan 44' (pen.); Myshnyov 45+2' (pen.), (yellow card) 65'; Tankovskyi 73'; Ocheretko (yellow card) 90+4'	Stadium: Dynamo Stadium; Attendance: 0 Referee: Denys Shurman
Note: Match was played behind closed doors due to quarantine in Ukraine during COVID-19 pandemic.

20 November 2020 10	Rukh Lviv	0–0	FC Mariupol	Lviv
19:00 EET (UTC+02:00)	Martynyuk (yellow card) 86'	Report		Stadium: Arena Lviv; Attendance: 0 Referee: Kostyantyn Trukhanov
Note: Match was played behind closed doors due to quarantine in Ukraine during COVID-19 pandemic.

27 November 2020 11	FC Lviv	1–3	FC Mariupol	Lviv
19:00 EET (UTC+02:00)	Romanchuk (yellow card) 29'; Mihoubi 73', (yellow card) 74'; Mahmutovic (yellow card) 76'; Pachtmann (yellow card) 89'	Report	Sikan 12'; Myshnyov 34'; Muravskyi (yellow card) 49'; Ocheretko 60'; Peterman (yellow card) 73'; Chekh (red card) 88'	Stadium: Arena Lviv; Attendance: 0 Referee: Yevhen Aranovskyi
Note: Match was played behind closed doors due to quarantine in Ukraine during COVID-19 pandemic.

5 December 2020 12	FC Mariupol	1–2	Dynamo Kyiv	Kyiv
19:30 EET (UTC+02:00)	Sikan (yellow card) 16'; Peterman (yellow card) 50'; Myshnyov (yellow card) 50'; Dobrokhotov (yellow card) 64'; Topalov 90+4'	Report	Harmash 6'; Neshcheret (red card) 39'; Tsyhankov 77'	Stadium: Dynamo Stadium; Attendance: 0 Referee: Andriy Kovalenko
Note: Match was played behind closed doors due to quarantine in Ukraine during COVID-19 pandemic.

13 December 2020 13	Desna Chernihiv	2–0	FC Mariupol	Kyiv
17:00 EET (UTC+02:00)	Kartushov 50', (yellow card) 90+2'; Khlyobas 56'; Dombrovskyi (yellow card) 77'	Report	Chobotenko (yellow card) 75'; Bondarenko (yellow card) 79'; Chekh (yellow card) 84'	Stadium: NSC Olimpiyskiy; Attendance: 0 Referee: Oleksandr Shandor
Note: Match was played behind closed doors due to quarantine in Ukraine during COVID-19 pandemic.

14 February 2021 14	FC Mariupol	0–1	FC Oleksandriya	Zaporizhia
14:00 EET (UTC+02:00)	Ocheretko (yellow card) 47'; Kyryukhantsev (yellow card) 52'; Bykov (yellow card) 64'; Chobotenko (yellow card) 73'	Report	Sitalo (yellow card) 5', (goal) 38'; Pashayev (yellow card) 65'; Miroshnichenko (yellow card) 90+4'	Stadium: Slavutych-Arena; Attendance: 0 Referee: Oleksandr Shandor
Note: Match was played behind closed doors due to quarantine in Ukraine during COVID-19 pandemic.

20 February 2021 15	FC Mariupol	0–1	Zorya Luhansk	Zaporizhia
14:00 EET (UTC+02:00)	Tankovskyi (yellow card) 60'; Chekh (yellow card) 74'	Report	Zahedi 34', (yellow card) 39'; Hladkyy (yellow card) 50'; Vasilj (yellow card) 90+3'	Stadium: Slavutych-Arena; Attendance: 0 Referee: Volodymyr Novokhatniy
Note: Match was played behind closed doors due to quarantine in Ukraine during COVID-19 pandemic.

27 February 2021 16	FC Mariupol	2–2	SC Dnipro-1	Dnipro
14:00 EET (UTC+02:00)	Chobotenko (yellow card) 12'; Melichenko 34'; Stasyuk (yellow card) 50'; Bondarenko (yellow card) 65'; Bykov (yellow card) 69'; Kulakov 87'; Drambayev (yellow card) 89'	Report	Douglas (yellow card) 6', (goal) 13'; Nazarenko (yellow card) 10'; Dovbyk 61' (pen.); Lucas Taylor (yellow card) 87'	Stadium: Dnipro-Arena; Attendance: 1,582; Referee: Maksym Kozyryatskyi

6 March 2021 17	FC Mariupol	0–1	Vorskla Poltava	Poltava
14:00 EET (UTC+02:00)	Bykov (red card) 34'; Tankovskyi (yellow card) 56' (yellow-red card) 78'; Kulakov (yellow card) 90'	Report	Kane (yellow card) 21'; Kulach 35' (pen.); Sklyar (yellow card) 39'	Stadium: Vorskla Stadium; Attendance: 1,488; Referee: Denys Shurman

14 March 2021 18	FC Mariupol	1–4	Kolos Kovalivka	Kovalivka
14:00 EET (UTC+02:00)	Kulakov (yellow card) 41'; Bondarenko 45+1'; Chobotenko (yellow card) 58'	Report	Churko 5'; Kostyshyn 29'; Novak 48'; Lysenko 61'; Ngamba (yellow card) 75'; Antyukh (yellow card) 90+1'; Zolotov (yellow card) 90+3'	Stadium: Kolos Stadium; Attendance: 2,348; Referee: Oleksandr Shandor

20 March 2021 19	FC Mariupol	0–0	FC Mynai	Mariupol
14:00 EET (UTC+02:00)	Tankovskyi (yellow card) 87'	Report	Snizhko (yellow card) 59'; Khakhlyov (yellow card) 77'	Stadium: Volodymyr Boiko Stadium; Attendance: 1,997; Referee: Anatoliy Abdula

3 April 2021 20	FC Mariupol	4–3	Inhulets Petrove	Kharkiv
14:00 EEST (UTC+03:00)	Bondarenko 45+3' (pen.), 46', 60' (pen.); Stasyuk 67'; Tankovskyi (yellow card) 72'; Chekh (yellow card) 74'; Myshnyov (yellow card) 86'; Kudryk (yellow card) 87'; Kyryukhantsev (yellow card) 96'	Report	Kvasnyi (yellow card) 19'; Bartulović (yellow card) 24'; Plokhotnyuk 52'; Kovalenko 53'; Semenko (yellow card) 59'; Balan (yellow card) 64'; Shevtsov 88' (pen.)	Stadium: OSC Metalist; Attendance: 5 Referee: Vitaliy Romanov

10 April 2021 21	FC Mariupol	0–3	Shakhtar Donetsk	Kyiv
14:00 EEST (UTC+03:00)	Kuliyev (yellow card) 5'	Report	Moraes 35', 78' (pen.); Solomon 37'; Bondar (yellow card) 61'	Stadium: NSC Olimpiyskiy; Attendance: 0 Referee: Anatoliy Abdula
Note: Match was played behind closed doors due to quarantine in Ukraine during COVID-19 pandemic.

18 April 2021 22	FC Mariupol	1–1	Olimpik Donetsk	Kharkiv
17:00 EEST (UTC+03:00)	Kulakov 5', (yellow card) 63'	Report	Nkeng 26' (pen.); Dramé (yellow card) 47'; Babenko (yellow card) 56'	Stadium: OSC Metalist; Attendance: 0 Referee: Viktor Kopiyevskyi
Note: Match was played behind closed doors due to quarantine in Ukraine during COVID-19 pandemic.

23 April 2021 23	FC Mariupol	0–3	Rukh Lviv	Kharkiv
19:00 EEST (UTC+03:00)	Chobotenko (red card) 65'; Bykov (yellow card) 84'	Report	Martynyuk (yellow card) 30'; Klymchuk 66' (pen.); Boryachuk 76'; Boychuk (yellow card) 78'; Runich 88'; Mysyk (yellow card) 90+2'	Stadium: OSC Metalist; Attendance: 0 Referee: Vitaliy Romanov
Note: Match was played behind closed doors due to quarantine in Ukraine during COVID-19 pandemic.

2 May 2021 24	FC Mariupol	1–2	FC Lviv	Mariupol
17:00 EEST (UTC+03:00)	Topalov 31'; Bykov (yellow card) 36'; Ocheretko (yellow card) 59'; Sahutkin (yellow card) 72'; Kulakov (yellow card) 90+3'	Report	Semeniv 33'; Mahmutovic (yellow card) 45', (goal) 89'; Romanchuk (yellow card) 72'	Stadium: Volodymyr Boiko Stadium; Attendance: 692; Referee: Yaroslav Kozyk

5 May 2021 25	Dynamo Kyiv	0–0	FC Mariupol	Mariupol
14:00 EEST (UTC+03:00)	de Pena (yellow card) 12' (yellow-red card) 51'; Buyalskyi (yellow card) 71'	Report	Horbunov (yellow card) 20'; Tankovskyi (yellow card) 30'; Topalov (yellow card) 55'; Myshnyov (yellow card) 68'; Chekh (yellow card) 73'; Mampassi (yellow card) 80'	Stadium: Volodymyr Boiko Stadium; Attendance: 869; Referee: Andriy Kovalenko

9 May 2021 26	FC Mariupol	4–1	Desna Chernihiv	Mariupol
14:00 EEST (UTC+03:00)	Muravskyi (yellow card) 37'; Ocheretko 61'; Sikan 63', 79'; Bondarenko (yellow card) 83', (goal) 86'	Report	Konoplya 44'; Hutsulyak (yellow card) 56'; Dombrovskyi (yellow card) 58' (yellow-red card) 62'; Sukhotskyi (yellow card) 69'	Stadium: Volodymyr Boiko Stadium; Attendance: 572; Referee: Mykola Balakin

=== Ukrainian Cup ===
30 September 2020 Round of 32 (1/16)	Viktoriya Mykolaivka	1–3	FC Mariupol	Mykolaivka
15:00 EEST (UTC+03:00)	Kasyanov 16'; Kuzmin (yellow card) 26'	Report	Topalov (yellow card) 37', (goal) 70'; Chobotenko 83'; Horbunov (yellow card) 86'; Chekh (yellow card) 87'; Peterman 90+1'	Stadium: Viktoriya Stadium; Attendance: 112; Referee: Yuriy Mozharovskyi

2 December 2020 Round of 16 (1/8)	Veres Rivne	1–0	FC Mariupol	Mlyniv
13:00 EEST (UTC+03:00)	Petko (yellow card) 21'; Pasich (yellow card) 25'; Miroshnyk (yellow card) 52' (yellow-red card) 72'; Hehedosh 67'	Report	Horbunov (yellow card) 7'; Bondarenko (yellow card) 12'; Peterman (yellow card) 15'; Muravskyi (yellow card) 51'; Chobotenko (yellow card) 78'	Stadium: Kolos Stadium; Attendance: 0 Referee: Oleksandr Derdo

== Statistics ==
=== Appearances and goals ===
No.	Pos	Nat	Player	Total		Premier League		Cup	
No.	Pos	Nat	Player	Apps	Goals	Apps	Goals	Apps	Goals
Goalkeepers
1	GK	(Ukraine) UKR	Yevhen Halchuk	16	0	15	0	1	0
30	GK	(Ukraine) UKR	Pavlo Kravtsov	1	0	1	0	0	0
31	GK	(Ukraine) UKR	Oleh Kudryk	11	0	10	0	1	0
Defenders
2	DF	(Ukraine) UKR	Oleksiy Bykov	19	0	16+2	0	1	0
4	DF	(Ukraine) UKR	Serhiy Chobotenko	25	1	22+1	0	1+1	1
15	DF	(Ukraine) UKR	Kyrylo Melichenko	11	1	9+2	1	0	0
19	DF	(Ukraine) UKR	Ihor Tyschenko	4	0	2+2	0	0	0
20	DF	(Ukraine) UKR	Oleksiy Kashchuk	15	0	5+10	0	0	0
35	DF	(Ukraine) UKR	Mark Mampassi	6	0	3+3	0	0	0
37	DF	(Ukraine) UKR	Nazariy Muravskyi	8	0	5+1	0	2	0
39	DF	(Ukraine) UKR	Danylo Dmytriyev	1	0	1	0	0	0
42	DF	(Ukraine) UKR	Mykyta Fursenko	1	0	0+1	0	0	0
44	DF	(Ukraine) UKR	Danylo Sahutkin	9	1	6+3	1	0	0
47	DF	(Ukraine) UKR	Mykyta Kozytskyi	1	0	0+1	0	0	0
49	DF	(Ukraine) UKR	Illya Ukhan	1	0	1	0	0	0
55	DF	(Ukraine) UKR	Oleksandr Drambayev	9	0	3+6	0	0	0
95	DF	(Ukraine) UKR	Petro Stasyuk	27	1	22+3	1	2	0
96	DF	(Ukraine) UKR	Ihor Kyryukhantsev	19	0	13+5	0	1	0
Midfielders
6	MF	(Ukraine) UKR	Maksym Chekh	23	0	15+7	0	1	0
9	MF	(Ukraine) UKR	Dmytro Myshnyov	26	2	24	2	2	0
11	MF	(Ukraine) UKR	Oleh Ocheretko	18	2	13+4	2	1	0
14	MF	(Ukraine) UKR	Anton Baidal	1	0	0+1	0	0	0
17	MF	(Ukraine) UKR	Serhiy Horbunov	21	1	15+4	1	2	0
21	MF	(Ukraine) UKR	Artem Bondarenko	23	8	17+4	8	1+1	0
23	MF	(Ukraine) UKR	Yaroslav Dobrokhotov	4	0	1+2	0	0+1	0
27	MF	(Ukraine) UKR	Rodion Plaksa	3	0	1+2	0	0	0
28	MF	(Ukraine) UKR	Andriy Vyskrebentsev	1	0	1	0	0	0
29	MF	(Ukraine) UKR	Vyacheslav Tankovskyi	16	1	15	1	1	0
34	MF	(Ukraine) UKR	Mykyta Peterman	16	1	4+10	0	2	1
38	MF	(Ukraine) UKR	Pavlo Shushko	1	0	0+1	0	0	0
40	MF	(Ukraine) UKR	Ivan Mamrosenko	1	0	1	0	0	0
45	MF	(Ukraine) UKR	Oleksandr Kozhevnikov	1	0	0+1	0	0	0
48	MF	(Ukraine) UKR	Ivan Koshkosh	1	0	1	0	0	0
77	MF	(Ukraine) UKR	Andriy Kulakov	21	3	9+11	3	0+1	0
79	MF	(Ukraine) UKR	Eldar Kuliyev	8	0	4+3	0	0+1	0
Forwards
7	FW	(Ukraine) UKR	Dmytro Topalov	20	4	16+2	3	1+1	1
46	FW	(Ukraine) UKR	Myroslav Trofymyuk	1	0	1	0	0	0
99	FW	(Ukraine) UKR	Danylo Sikan	16	4	12+2	4	2	0
Players transferred out during the season
8	DF	(Ukraine) UKR	Vyacheslav Velyev	3	0	2+1	0	0	0
90	FW	(Ukraine) UKR	Stanislav Biblyk	3	0	0+3	0	0	0
97	MF	(Ukraine) UKR	Danylo Ihnatenko	3	0	1+2	0	0	0

Source: Competitions

Last updated: 9 May 2021

=== Goalscorers ===
Rank	No.	Pos	Nat	Name	Premier League	Cup	Total
1	21	MF	(Ukraine)	Artem Bondarenko	8	0	8
2	7	FW	(Ukraine)	Dmytro Topalov	3	1	4
2	99	FW	(Ukraine)	Danylo Sikan	4	0	4
4	77	MF	(Ukraine)	Andriy Kulakov	3	0	3
5	9	MF	(Ukraine)	Dmytro Myshnyov	2	0	2
5	11	MF	(Ukraine)	Oleh Ocheretko	2	0	2
7	4	DF	(Ukraine)	Serhiy Chobotenko	0	1	1
7	15	DF	(Ukraine)	Kyrylo Melichenko	1	0	1
7	17	DF	(Ukraine)	Serhiy Horbunov	1	0	1
7	29	MF	(Ukraine)	Vyacheslav Tankovskyi	1	0	1
7	34	MF	(Ukraine)	Mykyta Peterman	0	1	1
7	44	DF	(Ukraine)	Danylo Sahutkin	1	0	1
7	95	DF	(Ukraine)	Petro Stasyuk	1	0	1
				Total	27	3	30

Last updated: 9 May 2021

=== Clean sheets ===
Rank	No.	Pos	Nat	Name	Premier League	Cup	Total
1	1	GK	(Ukraine)	Yevhen Halchuk	5	0	5
2	31	GK	(Ukraine)	Oleh Kudryk	2	0	2
				Total	7	0	7

Last updated: 9 May 2021

=== Disciplinary record ===
No.	Pos	Nat	Player	Premier League			Cup			Total		
No.	Pos	Nat	Player	Booked	(yellow card) (yellow-red card)	Sent off (straight red)	Booked	(yellow card) (yellow-red card)	Sent off (straight red)	Booked	(yellow card) (yellow-red card)	Sent off (straight red)
1	GK	(Ukraine)	Yevhen Halchuk	1	0	0	0	0	0	1	0	0
2	DF	(Ukraine)	Oleksiy Bykov	8	0	1	0	0	0	8	0	1
4	DF	(Ukraine)	Serhiy Chobotenko	5	0	1	1	0	0	6	0	1
6	MF	(Ukraine)	Maksym Chekh	5	0	1	1	0	0	6	0	1
7	FW	(Ukraine)	Dmytro Topalov	4	0	0	1	0	0	5	0	0
9	MF	(Ukraine)	Dmytro Myshnyov	5	0	0	0	0	0	5	0	0
11	MF	(Ukraine)	Oleh Ocheretko	4	0	0	0	0	0	4	0	0
17	MF	(Ukraine)	Serhiy Horbunov	1	0	0	2	0	0	3	0	0
19	DF	(Ukraine)	Ihor Tyschenko	1	0	0	0	0	0	1	0	0
20	DF	(Ukraine)	Oleksiy Kashchuk	1	1	0	0	0	0	1	1	0
21	MF	(Ukraine)	Artem Bondarenko	3	0	0	1	0	0	4	0	0
23	MF	(Ukraine)	Yaroslav Dobrokhotov	1	0	0	0	0	0	1	0	0
29	MF	(Ukraine)	Vyacheslav Tankovskyi	4	1	0	0	0	0	4	1	0
31	GK	(Ukraine)	Oleh Kudryk	1	0	0	0	0	0	1	0	0
34	MF	(Ukraine)	Mykyta Peterman	2	1	0	1	0	0	3	1	0
35	DF	(Ukraine)	Mark Mampassi	1	0	0	0	0	0	1	0	0
37	DF	(Ukraine)	Nazariy Muravskyi	2	0	0	1	0	0	3	0	0
44	DF	(Ukraine)	Danylo Sahutkin	2	1	0	0	0	0	2	1	0
55	DF	(Ukraine)	Oleksandr Drambayev	1	0	0	0	0	0	1	0	0
77	MF	(Ukraine)	Andriy Kulakov	5	0	0	0	0	0	5	0	0
79	MF	(Ukraine)	Eldar Kuliyev	1	0	0	0	0	0	1	0	0
95	DF	(Ukraine)	Petro Stasyuk	2	0	0	0	0	0	2	0	0
96	DF	(Ukraine)	Ihor Kyryukhantsev	3	0	0	0	0	0	3	0	0
97	MF	(Ukraine)	Danylo Ihnatenko	1	1	0	0	0	0	1	1	0
99	FW	(Ukraine)	Danylo Sikan	1	0	0	0	0	0	1	0	0
			Total	65	5	3	8	0	0	73	5	3

Last updated: 9 May 2021

=== Attendances ===
	Matches	Attendances	Average	High	Low
Premier League	13	8,684	668	2,348	0
Cup	0	0	0	0	0
Total	13	8,684	668	2,348	0

Last updated: 9 May 2021
