= 2020–21 FC Shakhtar Donetsk season =

FC Shakhtar Donetsk
2020–21 season
- Owner: Rinat Akhmetov
- President: Rinat Akhmetov
- Head coach: Luís Castro
- Stadium: NSC Olimpiyskiy
- Premier League: 2nd
- Ukrainian Cup: Quarter-finals
- Ukrainian Super Cup: Runners-up
- UEFA Champions League: Group stage
- UEFA Europa League: Round of 16
- Top goalscorer: League: Manor Solomon (9); All: Manor Solomon (11)
Home colours	Away colours	Third colours

The 2020–21 season was FC Shakhtar Donetsk's 30th season in existence and the club's 22nd consecutive season in the top flight of Ukrainian football. In addition to the domestic league, Shakhtar Donetsk participated in this season's editions of the Ukrainian Cup, the Ukrainian Super Cup, the UEFA Champions League and the UEFA Europa League. The season covers the period from 18 August 2020 to 30 June 2021.

== Season events ==
On 11 August, it was announced that Shakhtar Donetsk would play their home games for the up-coming season at the NSC Olimpiyskiy in Kyiv.

On 17 September, Danylo Sikan was loaned to Mariupol for the season.

On 13 December 2020, Shakhtar's game against Inhulets Petrove scheduled for later in the day was called off due to the poor condition of the pitch in Kropyvnytskyi. Subsequently, the match was awarded as a 3–0 victory to Shakhtar.

On 1 February, Shakhtar Donetsk confirmed that Viktor Kovalenko had left the club to sign for Atalanta.

On 13 February, Shakhtar Donetsk's game away to Kolos Kovalivka was postponed due to bad weather, and moved to the Valeriy Lobanovskyi Dynamo Stadium in Kyiv to be played on 14 February.

On 12 May, three days after the end of the season, Shakhtar Donetsk announced that manager Luís Castro would be leaving the club after two-years in charge.

== Squad ==
As of match played 9 May 2021

Number	Name	Nationality	Position	Date of birth (age)	Signed from	Signed in	Contract ends	Apps.	Goals
Goalkeepers
1	Oleksiy Shevchenko	(Ukraine)	GK	24 February 1992 (aged 29)	Karpaty Lviv	2018		7	0
30	Andriy Pyatov	(Ukraine)	GK	28 June 1984 (aged 36)	Vorskla Poltava	2007	2023	467	0
54	Yevhen Hrytsenko	(Ukraine)	GK	5 February 1995 (aged 26)	Academy	2012		0	0
81	Anatoliy Trubin	(Ukraine)	GK	1 August 2001 (aged 19)	Academy	2019		38	0
Defenders
2	Dodô	(Brazil)	DF	17 November 1998 (aged 22)	Coritiba	2018	2022	70	5
4	Serhiy Kryvtsov	(Ukraine)	DF	15 March 1991 (aged 30)	Metalurh Zaporizhya	2010		199	13
5	Davit Khocholava	(Georgia (country))	DF	8 February 1993 (aged 28)	Chornomorets Odesa	2017		83	3
15	Viktor Korniyenko	(Ukraine)	DF	14 February 1999 (aged 22)	Academy	2016		16	0
22	Mykola Matviyenko	(Ukraine)	DF	2 May 1996 (aged 25)	Academy	2015		107	5
31	Ismaily	(Brazil)	DF	11 January 1990 (aged 31)	Braga	2013		207	16
49	Vitão	(Brazil)	DF	2 February 2000 (aged 21)	Palmeiras	2019	2024	21	0
77	Valeriy Bondar	(Ukraine)	DF	27 February 1999 (aged 22)	Academy	2019		31	1
Midfielders
6	Taras Stepanenko	(Ukraine)	MF	8 August 1989 (aged 31)	Metalurh Zaporizhya	2010		335	24
8	Marcos Antônio	(Brazil)	MF	13 June 2000 (aged 20)	Estoril	2019		73	6
9	Dentinho	(Brazil)	MF	19 January 1989 (aged 32)	Corinthians	2011		189	27
11	Marlos	(Ukraine)	MF	7 June 1988 (aged 32)	Metalist Kharkiv	2014		260	70
14	Tetê	(Brazil)	MF	15 February 2000 (aged 21)	Grêmio	2019		79	21
17	Maksym Malyshev	(Ukraine)	MF	24 December 1992 (aged 28)	Academy	2009		77	7
19	Manor Solomon	(Israel)	MF	24 July 1999 (aged 21)	Maccabi Petah Tikva	2019		80	18
21	Alan Patrick	(Brazil)	MF	13 February 1991 (aged 30)	Santos	2011		157	22
23	Vladyslav Vakula	(Ukraine)	MF	29 April 1999 (aged 22)	Mariupol	2019	2024	4	0
27	Maycon	(Brazil)	MF	15 July 1997 (aged 23)	Corinthians	2018		71	8
28	Marquinhos Cipriano	(Brazil)	MF	27 March 1999 (aged 22)	São Paulo	2018		25	1
50	Serhiy Bolbat	(Ukraine)	MF	13 January 1993 (aged 28)	Olimpik Donetsk	2011		63	3
61	Heorhiy Sudakov	(Ukraine)	MF	1 September 2002 (aged 18)	Academy	2020		14	1
70	Yevhen Konoplyanka	(Ukraine)	MF	29 September 1989 (aged 31)	Schalke 04	2019	2022	42	5
91	Mykhailo Mudryk	(Ukraine)	MF	5 January 2001 (aged 20)	Academy	2019		6	0
99	Fernando	(Brazil)	MF	1 March 1999 (aged 22)	Palmeiras	2018		55	4
Forwards
10	Júnior Moraes	(Ukraine)	FW	4 April 1987 (aged 34)	Dynamo Kyiv	2018	2020	104	59
59	Bohdan Viunnyk	(Ukraine)	FW	21 May 2002 (aged 18)	Academy	2020		6	0
Away on loan
2	Bohdan Butko	(Ukraine)	DF	13 January 1991 (aged 30)	Academy	2008		64	1
45	Danylo Sikan	(Ukraine)	FW	16 April 2001 (aged 20)	Karpaty Lviv	2019		8	0
52	Ihor Kyryukhantsev	(Ukraine)	DF	29 January 1996 (aged 25)	Academy	2013			
56	Andriy Kulakov	(Ukraine)	MF	28 April 1999 (aged 22)	Metalist Kharkiv	2016			
57	Oleksiy Kashchuk	(Ukraine)	FW	29 June 2000 (aged 20)	Vorskla Poltava	2016			
65	Yukhym Konoplya	(Ukraine)	DF	26 August 1999 (aged 21)	Academy	2017			
71	Maksym Chekh	(Ukraine)	MF	3 January 1999 (aged 22)	Academy	2018			
72	Vyacheslav Churko	(Ukraine)	MF	10 May 1993 (aged 27)	Academy	2009			
73	Danylo Ihnatenko	(Ukraine)	MF	14 February 1996 (aged 25)	Metalurh Zaporizhya	2016		0	0
75	Artem Bondarenko	(Ukraine)	MF	21 August 2000 (aged 20)	Academy	2020		5	0
76	Oleksandr Pikhalyonok	(Ukraine)	MF	7 May 1997 (aged 24)	Academy	2014		7	0
88	Olarenwaju Kayode	(Nigeria)	FW	8 May 1993 (aged 28)	Manchester City	2018	2023	24	4
95	Eduard Sobol	(Ukraine)	DF	20 April 1995 (aged 26)	Metalurh Zaporizhya	2013			
	Valeriy Bondarenko	(Ukraine)	DF	3 February 1994 (aged 27)	Oleksandriya	2019		1	0
	Dmytro Topalov	(Ukraine)	MF	12 March 1998 (aged 23)	Academy	2017			
	Andriy Boryachuk	(Ukraine)	FW	23 April 1996 (aged 25)	Academy	2015		17	6
Players who left during the season
7	Taison	(Brazil)	MF	13 January 1988 (aged 33)	Metalist Kharkiv	2013		299	55
20	Viktor Kovalenko	(Ukraine)	MF	14 February 1996 (aged 25)	Academy	2015		200	32
55	Oleh Kudryk	(Ukraine)	GK	17 October 1996 (aged 24)	Academy	2016			
62	Danylo Sahutkin	(Ukraine)	DF	19 April 1996 (aged 25)	Academy	2013		0	0
90	Artem Dudik	(Ukraine)	FW	4 April 1987 (aged 34)	Volyn Lutsk	2017		0	0
	Kyrylo Melichenko	(Ukraine)	DF	7 June 1999 (aged 21)	Academy	2018		0	0

=== On loan ===
Note: Flags indicate national team as defined under FIFA eligibility rules; some limited exceptions apply. Players may hold more than one non-FIFA nationality.

No.	Pos.	Nation	Player
45	FW	UKR	Danylo Sikan (on loan at Mariupol until 30 June 2021)
52	DF	UKR	Ihor Kyryukhantsev (on loan at Mariupol until 30 June 2021)
56	MF	UKR	Andriy Kulakov (at Mariupol until 30 June 2021)
57	MF	UKR	Oleksiy Kashchuk (on loan at Mariupol until 30 June 2021)
61	MF	UKR	Dmytro Topalov (at Mariupol until 30 June 2021)
64	MF	UKR	Oleh Ocheretko (on loan at Mariupol until 30 June 2021)
65	DF	UKR	Yukhym Konoplya (at Desna until 30 June 2021)
71	MF	UKR	Maksym Chekh (at Mariupol until 30 June 2021)
73	MF	UKR	Danylo Ihnatenko (at Dnipro-1 until 30 June 2021)
75	MF	UKR	Artem Bondarenko (at Mariupol until 30 June 2021)
76	MF	UKR	Oleksandr Pikhalyonok (at Dnipro-1 until 30 June 2021)
83	MF	UKR	Dmytro Kryskiv (on loan at Metalist 1925 Kharkiv until 30 June 2021)

No.	Pos.	Nation	Player
86	DF	UKR	Dmytro Pavlish (on loan at Hirnyk-Sport until 30 June 2021)
87	DF	UKR	Nazariy Muravskyi (on loan at Mariupol until 30 June 2021)
88	FW	NGR	Olarenwaju Kayode (on loan at Sivasspor until 30 June 2021)
95	DF	UKR	Eduard Sobol (at Brugge until 30 June 2021)
—	GK	UKR	Heorhiy Yermakov (on loan at Oleksandriya until 30 June 2021)
—	DF	UKR	Valeriy Bondarenko (on loan at Oleksandriya until 30 June 2021)
—	DF	UKR	Bohdan Butko (at Lech Poznań until 31 December 2020)
—	DF	UKR	Oleksandr Drambayev (on loan at Mariupol until 30 June 2021)
—	DF	UKR	Mark Mampassi (on loan at Mariupol until 30 June 2021)
—	MF	UKR	Vyacheslav Churko (on loan at Kolos Kovalivka until 30 June 2021)
—	MF	UKR	Vyacheslav Tankovskyi (on loan at Mariupol until 30 June 2021)
—	FW	UKR	Andriy Boryachuk (on loan at Rukh Lviv until 30 Jun 2022)

== Transfers ==
=== Out ===
Date	Position	Nationality	Name	To	Fee	Ref.
24 December 2020	DF	(Ukraine)	Kyrylo Melichenko	Mariupol	Undisclosed	
6 January 2021	DF	(Ukraine)	Danylo Sahutkin	Mariupol	Undisclosed	
1 February 2021	MF	(Ukraine)	Viktor Kovalenko	Atalanta	Undisclosed	

=== Loans out ===
Date from	Position	Nationality	Name	To	Date to	Ref.
4 July 2020	MF	(Ukraine)	Klim Prykhodko	Mariupol	End of season	
20 July 2020	MF	(Ukraine)	Oleksandr Zubkov	Ferencváros	End of season	
5 August 2020	GK	(Ukraine)	Oleh Kudryk	Mariupol	End of season	
6 August 2020	MF	(Ukraine)	Artem Bondarenko	Mariupol	End of season	
6 August 2020	MF	(Ukraine)	Mykhailo Mudryk	Desna Chernihiv	End of season	
20 August 2020	DF	(Ukraine)	Kyrylo Melichenko	Mynai	24 December 2020	
20 August 2020	DF	(Ukraine)	Dmytro Pavlish	Mynai	End of season	
26 August 2020	FW	(Ukraine)	Artem Dudik	Sandecja Nowy Sącz	End of season	
17 September 2020	FW	(Ukraine)	Danylo Sikan	Mariupol	End of season	
17 September 2020	FW	(Nigeria)	Olarenwaju Kayode	Sivasspor	End of season	
2 October 2020	MF	(Ukraine)	Danylo Ihnatenko	Dnipro-1	End of season	
2 October 2020	MF	(Ukraine)	Oleksandr Pikhalyonok	Dnipro-1	End of season	
4 October 2020	DF	(Ukraine)	Bohdan Butko	Lech Poznań	31 December 2020	
5 January 2021	DF	(Ukraine)	Oleksandr Drambayev	Mariupol	End of season	

=== Released ===
Date	Position	Nationality	Name	Joined	Date	Ref.
16 April 2021	MF	(Brazil)	Taison	Internacional	16 April 2021	
30 June 2021	DF	(Ukraine)	Bohdan Butko			
30 June 2021	MF	(Ukraine)	Maksym Malyshev			
30 June 2021	MF	(Ukraine)	Vyacheslav Churko	Kolos Kovalivka	1 July 2021	

== Friendlies ==
21 January 2021	Shakhtar Donetsk (Ukraine)	1–1	(Poland) Lech Poznań	Belek, Turkey
16:00 EET (UTC+2)	Kovalenko 90' (pen.)	Report	Marchwiński 58'	Stadium: Calista Sports Center; Attendance: 0 Referee: Ibrahim Guner

23 January 2021	Shakhtar Donetsk (Ukraine)	2–2	(Bulgaria) Ludogorets Razgrad	Belek, Turkey
16:00 EET (UTC+2)	Solomon 5'; Konoplyanka 55'; Marlos (yellow card)	Report	Ikoko 58'; Cauly 60'	Stadium: Calista Sports Center; Attendance: 0

25 January 2021	Shakhtar Donetsk (Ukraine)	v	(Slovenia) Maribor	Belek, Turkey
EET (UTC+2)		Report		Stadium: Calista Sports Center

26 January 2021	Shakhtar Donetsk (Ukraine)	4–1	(North Macedonia) Sileks	Belek, Turkey
10:00 EET (UTC+2)	Alan Patrick 55'; Kovalenko 65'; Stepanenko 68'; Dodô 90'; Dentinho (yellow card)	Report	D.Tanturovski 42'	Stadium: Regum Sports Center

31 January 2021	Shakhtar Donetsk (Ukraine)	0–0	(Serbia) Red Star Belgrade	Belek, Turkey
16:00 EET (UTC+2)		Report		Stadium: Calista Sports Center

== Competitions ==
=== Overview ===
Competition	First match	Last match	Starting round	Final position	Record							
Competition	First match	Last match	Starting round	Final position	Pld	W	D	L	GF	GA	GD	Win %
Premier League	21 August 2020	9 May 2021	Matchday 1	2nd	26	16	6	4	54	19	+35	61.54
Ukrainian Cup	3 March 2021		Quarter-finals	Quarter-finals	1	0	0	1	0	1	−1	0.00
Super Cup	25 August 2020		Final	Runners-up	1	0	0	1	1	3	−2	0.00
UEFA Champions League	21 October 2020	9 December 2020	Group stage	Group stage	6	2	2	2	5	12	−7	33.33
UEFA Europa League	18 February 2021	18 March 2021	Round of 32	Round of 16	4	2	0	2	4	5	−1	50.00
Total					38	20	8	10	64	40	+24	52.63

Last updated: 9 May 2021
Source: Competitions

=== Premier League ===
==== League table ====
Pos	Team	Pld	W	D	L	GF	GA	GD	Pts	Qualification or relegation
1	Dynamo Kyiv (C)	26	20	5	1	59	15	+44	65	Qualification for the Champions League group stage
2	Shakhtar Donetsk	26	16	6	4	54	19	+35	54	Qualification for the Champions League third qualifying round
3	Zorya Luhansk	26	15	5	6	44	22	+22	50	Qualification for the Europa League play-off round
4	Kolos Kovalivka	26	10	11	5	36	26	+10	41	Qualification for the Europa Conference League third qualifying round
5	Vorskla Poltava	26	11	8	7	37	30	+7	41	Qualification for the Europa Conference League second qualifying round

Source: Ukrainian Premier League
Rules for classification: 1) Points; 2) Head-to-head points; 3) Head-to-head goal difference; 4) Head-to-head higher number of goals scored; 5) Goal difference; 6) Higher number of goals scored; 7) Draw or "Golden match" if two teams tied for title (Article 22, paragraph 3).
(C) Champions

==== Results summary ====
Overall								Home						Away					
Pld	W	D	L	GF	GA	GD	Pts	W	D	L	GF	GA	GD	W	D	L	GF	GA	GD
26	16	6	4	54	19	+35	54	9	2	2	30	9	+21	7	4	2	24	10	+14

Last updated: 9 May 2021.
Source: Results

==== Results by round ====
Round	1	2	3	4	5	6	7	8	9	10	11	12	13	14	15	16	17	18	19	20	21	22	23	24	25	26
Ground	H	A	A	H	A	H	H	H	A	H	A	H	A	A	H	H	A	H	A	A	A	H	A	H	A	H
Result	W	D	D	W	D	W	D	W	W	D	W	W	W	D	W	L	W	W	L	W	W	L	L	W	W	W
Position	5	7	6	3	4	3	3	2	2	2	2	2	2	2	2	2	2	2	2	2	2	2	2	2	2	2

Updated to match(es) played on 9 May 2021. Source: Results
A = Away; H = Home; W = Win; D = Draw; L = Loss

==== Results ====
21 August 2020 1	Shakhtar Donetsk	3–1	Kolos Kovalivka	Kyiv
19:00 EEST (UTC+3)	Patrick 60' (pen.), 69'; Volynets 72' (o.g.)	Report	Yemets (yellow card) 31'; Volynets (yellow card) 45'; Zadoya (yellow card) 52'; Maksymenko (yellow card) 59'; Bondarenko (yellow card) 60'; Kostyshyn 77'	Stadium: NSC Olimpiyskiy; Attendance: 0 Referee: Igor Paskhal

20 September 2020 3	Zorya Luhansk	2–2	Shakhtar Donetsk	Zaporizhia
17:00 EEST (UTC+3)	Kocherhin 20' (yellow card) 90+3'; Yurchenko 28' (pen.); Favorov (yellow card) 72'; Grechkin (yellow card) 81'	Report	Marlos 17' (yellow card) 30'; Kryvtsov (yellow card) 44' (goal) 49'; Stepanenko (yellow card) 57'	Stadium: Slavutych-Arena; Attendance: 2,482; Referee: Vitalii Romanov

23 September 2020 2	Rukh Lviv	1–1	Shakhtar Donetsk	Lviv
19:00 EEST (UTC+3)	Brikner (yellow card) 42'; Kukharuk (yellow card) 43'; Stepanenko 47' (o.g.); Kukharevych (yellow card) 51'; Martynyuk (yellow card) 53'; Gliha (yellow card) 87'; Boychuk (yellow card) 90+4'; Duts (yellow card) 90+5'	Report	Bondar (yellow card) 36' (yellow-red card) 50'; Patrick (yellow card) 54'; Marlos 68'; Stepanenko (yellow card) 70'	Stadium: Skif Stadium; Attendance: 7,953; Referee: Maksym Kozyriatskyi

27 September 2020 4	Shakhtar Donetsk	2–0	Olimpik Donetsk	Kyiv
17:00 EEST (UTC+3)	Moraes (yellow card) 22', (goal) 66'; Matviyenko (yellow card) 33'; Kovalenko 64'; Marcos Antônio (yellow card) 90+1'	Report	Snurnitsyn (yellow card) 50'; Babenko (yellow card) 67'	Stadium: NSC Olimpiyskiy; Attendance: 0 Referee: Anatoliy Abdula

4 October 2020 5	Desna Chernihiv	2–2	Shakhtar Donetsk	Chernihiv
17:00 EEST (UTC+3)	Mostovyi 17'; Totovytskyi 26'; Hutsulyak (yellow card) 83'; Lytovka (yellow card) 90+3'	Report	Kovalenko 4'; Dentinho 79'; Stepanenko (yellow card) 90+3'	Stadium: Chernihiv Stadium; Attendance: 1,300; Referee: Ihor Paskhal

17 October 2020 6	Shakhtar Donetsk	5–1	FC Lviv	Kyiv
17:00 EEST (UTC+3)	Kovalenko 4', 18'; Marcos Antônio 9'; Dentinho 17'; Solomon 50'; Vakula (yellow card) 80'	Report	China (yellow card) 18', (goal) 25'; Koshman (yellow card) 46'; Kazlauskas (yellow card) 57'; Bohunov (yellow card) 62'; Borzenko (yellow card) 89'; Sabino (yellow card) 90'	Stadium: NSC Olimpiyskiy; Attendance: 0 Referee: Dmytro Bondarenko

24 October 2020 7	Shakhtar Donetsk	1–1	Vorskla Poltava	Kyiv
14:00 EEST (UTC+3)	Solomon 33'; Maycon (yellow card) 39'	Report	Kulach 7'; Ndiaye (yellow card) 17' (yellow-red card) 53'; Rebenok (yellow card) 36'; Perduta (yellow card) 49'; Puclin (yellow card) 74'	Stadium: Bannikov Stadium; Attendance: 0 Referee: Vitaliy Romanov

30 October 2020 8	Shakhtar Donetsk	4–1	Mariupol	Kyiv
19:00 EET (UTC+2)	Taison 26' (pen.), 75'; Sudakov 44'; Patrick 65' (pen.)	Report	Horbunov 72'	Stadium: NSC Olimpiyskiy; Attendance: 0 Referee: Volodymyr Novokhatniy

8 November 2020 9	Dynamo Kyiv	0–3	Shakhtar Donetsk	Kyiv
17:00 EET (UTC+2)	Andriyevskyi (yellow card) 17'; Verbič (yellow card) 37'; Sydorchuk (red card) 45+2'	Report	Tetê (yellow card) 14'; Moraes 34'; Marlos (yellow card) 44'; Marcos Antônio (yellow card) 51', (goal) 66'; Patrick 72'	Stadium: NSC Olimpiyskiy; Attendance: 0 Referee: Kateryna Monzul

21 November 2020 10	Shakhtar Donetsk	1–1	Oleksandriya	Kyiv
17:00 EET (UTC+2)	Cipriano (yellow card) 5'; Moraes (red card) 31'; Dodô 47'; Matviyenko (yellow card) 83'	Report	Tretyakov (yellow card) 45+1'; Banada 53'; Kovalets (yellow card) 76'	Stadium: NSC Olimpiyskiy; Attendance: 0 Referee: Kateryna Monzul

28 November 2020 11	Dnipro-1	0–1	Shakhtar Donetsk	Dnipro
19:30 EET (UTC+2)		Report	Maycon (yellow card) 57'; Patrick (yellow card) 60'; Tetê 88'; Marlos (yellow card) 89'	Stadium: Dnipro-Arena; Attendance: 0 Referee: Denys Shurman

5 December 2020 12	Shakhtar Donetsk	5–1	Mynai	Kyiv
17:00 EET (UTC+2)	Dopilka 20' (o.g.); Fernando 21'; Solomon 29'; Matviyenko 49'; Lopyryonok 72' (o.g.)	Report	Nuriyev 35' (penalty missed) 55'	Stadium: NSC Olimpiyskiy; Attendance: 0 Referee: Maksym Kozyryatskyi

13 December 2020 13	Inhulets Petrove	0–3	Shakhtar Donetsk	Kropyvnytskyi
14:00 EET (UTC+2)		Report		Stadium: Zirka Stadium
Note: Match postponed on 13 December due to bad weather, and subsequently awarded to Shakhtar 3-0.

14 February 2021 14	Kolos Kovalivka	0–0	Shakhtar Donetsk	Kyiv
14:00 EET (UTC+2)	Petrov (yellow card) 32'; Antyukh (yellow card) 44'; Bohdanov (yellow card) 60'; Chornomorets (yellow card) 64'; Kostyshyn (yellow card) 86'; Kravchenko (yellow card) 89'	Report		Stadium: Valeriy Lobanovskyi Dynamo Stadium; Attendance: 0 Referee: Ihor Paskhal
Note: Match played at the Valeriy Lobanovskyi Dynamo Stadium in Kyiv instead of Kolos Kovalivka's regular Kolos Stadium in Kovalivka due to poor weather conditions.

21 February 2021 15	Shakhtar Donetsk	2–0	Rukh Lviv	Kyiv
17:00 EET (UTC+2)	Tetê 9'; Vitão (yellow card) 31'; Dodô (yellow card) 39'; Patrick (yellow card) 55'; Maycon 60' (pen.)	Report	Kukharevych (yellow card) 5'; Prytula (yellow card) 49'; Karasyuk (yellow card) 59'; Varfolomieiev (yellow card) 90'; Bandura (red card) 90+5'	Stadium: NSC Olimpiyskiy; Attendance: 1,046; Referee: Mykola Balakin

28 February 2021 16	Shakhtar Donetsk	0–1	Zorya Luhansk	Kyiv
17:00 EET (UTC+2)	Patrick (yellow card) 57'	Report	Nazaryna (yellow card) 32'; Juninho (red card) 80'; Ivanisenya 90+4'	Stadium: NSC Olimpiyskiy; Attendance: 4,267; Referee: Kateryna Monzul

6 March 2021 17	Olimpik Donetsk	0–1	Shakhtar Donetsk	Kyiv
17:00 EET (UTC+2)	Nkeng (yellow card) 23'; Babenko (yellow card) 67' (yellow-red card) 83'; Do Couto (yellow card) 71'	Report	Dodô 24'; Ismaily (yellow card) 64'; Dentinho (yellow card) 85'	Stadium: Valeriy Lobanovskyi Dynamo Stadium; Attendance: 1,000; Referee: Yuriy Ivanov

14 March 2021 18	Shakhtar Donetsk	4–0	Desna Chernihiv	Kyiv
17:00 EET (UTC+2)	Tetê 34' (pen.), 80'; Matviyenko (yellow card) 40'; Dodô (yellow card) 67'; Solomon 75', 77'	Report	Ohirya (yellow card) 30'; Imerekov (yellow card) 34'	Stadium: NSC Olimpiyskiy; Attendance: 3,802; Referee: Igor Paskhal

21 March 2021 19	FC Lviv	3–2	Shakhtar Donetsk	Kharkiv
17:00 EET (UTC+2)	China (yellow card) 7', (goal) 73' (pen.); Brikner (yellow card) 16'; Alvaro 24'; Čirjak (yellow card) 33'; Nych 48'; Kostyk (yellow card) 90+4'	Report	Solomon 30', 56'; Moraes (yellow card) 32'; Patrick (yellow card) 65'; Trubin (yellow card) 72'	Stadium: OSC Metalist; Attendance: 1,682; Referee: Mykola Balakin

4 April 2021 20	Vorskla Poltava	0–2	Shakhtar Donetsk	Poltava
17:00 EEST (UTC+3)	Puclin (yellow card) 31'	Report	Moraes 42', 62'; Marlos (yellow card) 45+1'; Maycon (yellow card) 88'	Stadium: Oleksiy Butovsky Vorskla Stadium; Attendance: 0 Referee: Serhiy Boyko

10 April 2021 21	Mariupol	0–3	Shakhtar Donetsk	Mariupol
14:00 EEST (UTC+3)	Kuliyev (yellow card) 5'	Report	Moraes 35', 78' (pen.); Solomon 37'; Bondar (yellow card) 61'	Stadium: Volodymyr Boiko Stadium; Attendance: 0 Referee: Anatoliy Abdula

17 April 2021 22	Shakhtar Donetsk	0–1	Dynamo Kyiv	Kyiv
19:30 EEST (UTC+3)	Matviyenko (yellow card) 25'; Bondar (yellow card) 27'; Maycon (yellow card) 41'; Kryvtsov (yellow card) 90+1'	Report	Kędziora (yellow card) 31'; De Pena 34' (pen.); Buyalskyi (yellow card) 65'	Stadium: NSC Olimpiyskiy; Attendance: 0 Referee: Kateryna Monzul

25 April 2021 23	Oleksandriya	2–0	Shakhtar Donetsk	Oleksandriya
17:00 EEST (UTC+3)	Banada (yellow card) 11'; Hrechyshkin 44' (pen.); Dubra (yellow card) 47'; Shastal 54'	Report	Solomon (yellow card) 20'; Khocholava (yellow card) 73'; Korniyenko (yellow card) 76'	Stadium: CSC Nika Stadium; Attendance: 2,138; Referee: Serhiy Boyko

1 May 2021 24	Shakhtar Donetsk	2–1	Dnipro-1	Kyiv
17:00 EEST (UTC+3)	Dentinho 24'; Tetê 41'; Dodô (yellow card) 54'	Report	Taylor (yellow card) 30'; Di Franco (yellow card) 30'; Kohut (yellow card) 45'; Yarmolyuk (yellow card) 90+1'; Khoblenko 90+4'	Stadium: NSC Olimpiyskiy; Attendance: 1,378; Referee: Denys Shurman

6 May 2021 25	Mynai	0–4	Shakhtar Donetsk	Uzhhorod
19:00 EEST (UTC+3)		Report	Stepanenko 29', 81', (yellow card) 68'; Solomon 53'; Maycon 70'	Stadium: Avanhard Stadium; Attendance: 650; Referee: Volodymyr Novokhatniy

9 May 2021 26	Shakhtar Donetsk	1–0	Inhulets Petrove	Kyiv
17:00 EEST (UTC+3)	Bolbat (yellow card) 15'; Tetê 16'	Report	Kozak (yellow card) 30'; Bartulović (yellow card) 54'; Pavlov (yellow card) 83'	Stadium: NSC Olimpiyskiy; Attendance: 1,680; Referee: Dmytro Panchyshyn

=== Ukrainian Cup ===
3 March 2021 Quarterfinal	Ahrobiznes Volochysk	1–0 (a.e.t.)	Shakhtar Donetsk	Kyiv
19:00 EET (UTC+2)	Chernenko (yellow card) 26'; Mozil (yellow card) 53'; Shapoval (yellow card) 67'; Didyk (yellow card) 88'; Dumanyuk (yellow card) 92'; Semenets 96'	Report	Sudakov (yellow card) 35'; Patrick (penalty missed) 53'; Khocholava (yellow card) 90+1' (yellow-red card) 109'	Stadium: Valeriy Lobanovskyi Dynamo Stadium; Referee: Serhiy Boyko

=== Ukrainian Super Cup ===
25 August 2020 Final	Shakhtar Donetsk	1–3	Dynamo Kyiv	Kyiv
21:00 EEST (UTC+3)	Moraes 37'	Report	De Pena 20'; Rodrigues 31'; Shaparenko (yellow card) 49'; Karavayev (yellow card) 59'; Sol 83'	Stadium: NSC Olimpiyskiy; Attendance: 0 Referee: Vitaliy Romanov

=== UEFA Champions League ===
==== Group stage ====
The group stage draw was held on 1 October 2020.

Pos	Team	Pld	W	D	L	GF	GA	GD	Pts	Qualification
1	(Spain) Real Madrid	6	3	1	2	11	9	+2	10	Advance to knockout phase
2	(Germany) Borussia Mönchengladbach	6	2	2	2	16	9	+7	8 (Note: Head-to-head points: Borussia Mönchengladbach 6, Shakhtar Donetsk 0.)	Advance to knockout phase
3	(Ukraine) Shakhtar Donetsk	6	2	2	2	5	12	−7	8	Transfer to Europa League
4	(Italy) Inter Milan	6	1	3	2	7	9	−2	6	

Source: UEFA
Rules for classification: Group stage tiebreakers
Notes:

21 October 2020 1	Real Madrid (Spain)	2–3	(Ukraine) Shakhtar Donetsk	Madrid, Spain
19:55 EEST (UTC+3)	Asensio (yellow card) 34'; Modrić 54'; Vinícius 59'; Militão (yellow card) 87'	Report	Korniyenko (yellow card) 8'; Tetê 29'; Varane 33' (o.g.); Solomon 42'; Bondar (yellow card) 83'	Stadium: Alfredo Di Stéfano; Referee: Srđan Jovanović (Serbia)

27 October 2020 2	Shakhtar Donetsk (Ukraine)	0–0	(Italy) Inter Milan	Kyiv, Ukraine
19:55 EET (UTC+2)		Report	Bastoni (yellow card) 31'; Vidal (yellow card) 64'	Stadium: NSC Olimpiyskiy; Referee: Georgi Kabakov (Bulgaria)

3 November 2020 3	Shakhtar Donetsk (Ukraine)	0–6	(Germany) Borussia Mönchengladbach	Kyiv, Ukraine
19:55 EET (UTC+2)	Khocholava (yellow card) 46'; Solomon (yellow card) 63'	Report	Pléa 8', 26', 79'; Bondar 17' (o.g.); Bensebaini 44'; Stindl 65'; Lang (yellow card) 90'	Stadium: NSC Olimpiyskiy; Referee: Serdar Gözübüyük (Netherlands)

25 November 2020 4	Borussia Mönchengladbach (Germany)	4–0	(Ukraine) Shakhtar Donetsk	Mönchengladbach, Germany
19:55 EET (UTC+2)	Stindl 17' (pen.); Elvedi 34'; Embolo 45+1'; Lazaro (yellow card) 48'; Wendt 77'; Lainer (yellow card) 90+1'	Report	Stepanenko (yellow card) 45'	Stadium: Borussia-Park; Referee: Cüneyt Çakır (Turkey)

1 December 2020 5	Shakhtar Donetsk (Ukraine)	2–0	(Spain) Real Madrid	Kyiv, Ukraine
19:55 EET (UTC+2)	Dentinho 57'; Solomon 83'	Report	Varane (yellow card) 14'	Stadium: NSC Olimpiyskiy; Referee: Ovidiu Hațegan (Romania)

9 December 2020 6	Inter Milan (Italy)	0–0	(Ukraine) Shakhtar Donetsk	Mönchengladbach, Germany
22:00 EET (UTC+2)	Gagliardini (yellow card) 30'; Hakimi (yellow card) 39'; Brozović (yellow card) 61'	Report	Vitão (yellow card) 29'; Trubin (yellow card) 90+7'	Stadium: Borussia-Park; Referee: Slavko Vinčić (Slovenia)

=== UEFA Europa League ===
==== Knockout phase ====
The round of 32 draw was held on 14 December 2020.

18 February 2021 Round of 32 1st Leg	Maccabi Tel Aviv (Israel)	0–2	(Ukraine) Shakhtar Donetsk	Tel Aviv, Israel
22:00 EET (UTC+2)	Glazer (yellow card) 64'; Peretz (yellow card) 83'	Report	Patrick 31'; Marlos (yellow card) 41'; Taison (yellow card) 75'; Tetê 90+3'	Stadium: Bloomfield Stadium; Attendance: 0 Referee: François Letexier (France)
Note: Match played behind closed doors due to the COVID-19 pandemic in Israel.

25 February 2021 Round of 32 2nd Leg	Shakhtar Donetsk (Ukraine)	1–0 (3–0 agg.)	(Israel) Maccabi Tel Aviv	Kyiv, Ukraine
19:55 EET (UTC+2)	Vitão (yellow card) 33'; Moraes 67' (pen.)	Report		Stadium: NSC Olimpiyskiy; Attendance: 10,217; Referee: José María Sánchez Martínez (Spain)

11 March 2021 Last 16 1st leg	Roma (Italy)	3–0	(Ukraine) Shakhtar Donetsk	Rome, Italy
21:00 EET (UTC+2)	Pellegrini 23'; Kumbulla (yellow card) 55'; El Shaarawy 73'; Mancini 77', (yellow card) 83'	Report	Patrick (yellow card) 58'; Maycon (yellow card) 74'; Taison (yellow card) 75'	Stadium: Stadio Olimpico; Referee: Artur Soares Dias (Portugal)

18 March 2021 Last 16 2nd leg	Shakhtar Donetsk (Ukraine)	1–2 (1–5 agg.)	(Italy) Roma	Kyiv, Ukraine
19:55 EET (UTC+2)	Antônio (yellow card) 38'; Patrick (yellow card) 55'; Moraes 59'	Report	Ibañez (yellow card) 25'; Mayoral 48', 72'; Karsdorp (yellow card) 57'	Stadium: NSC Olimpiyskiy; Referee: Antonio Mateu Lahoz (Spain)

== Squad statistics ==
As of match played 9 May 2021

=== Appearances and goals ===
No.	Pos	Nat	Player	Total		Premier League		Ukrainian Cup		Super Cup		Champions League		Europa League	
No.	Pos	Nat	Player	Apps	Goals	Apps	Goals	Apps	Goals	Apps	Goals	Apps	Goals	Apps	Goals
2	DF	(Brazil) BRA	Dodô	34	2	23	2	0	0	1	0	6	0	4	0
4	DF	(Ukraine) UKR	Serhiy Kryvtsov	18	1	12	1	1	0	1	0	1	0	3	0
5	DF	(Georgia (country)) GEO	Davit Khocholava	12	0	7	0	1	0	0	0	3+1	0	0	0
6	MF	(Ukraine) UKR	Taras Stepanenko	24	2	13+5	2	0	0	1	0	3+1	0	1	0
8	MF	(Brazil) BRA	Marcos Antônio	33	2	13+10	2	1	0	1	0	3+1	0	1+3	0
9	MF	(Brazil) BRA	Dentinho	21	4	6+8	3	0+1	0	0	0	2+2	1	0+2	0
10	FW	(Ukraine) UKR	Júnior Moraes	25	9	16+1	6	0	0	1	1	2+1	0	4	2
11	MF	(Ukraine) UKR	Marlos	31	2	16+3	2	0+1	0	0+1	0	6	0	3+1	0
14	MF	(Brazil) BRA	Tetê	36	8	16+8	6	0+1	0	1	0	6	1	2+2	1
15	DF	(Ukraine) UKR	Viktor Korniyenko	16	0	9+2	0	1	0	0	0	3	0	0+1	0
19	MF	(Israel) ISR	Manor Solomon	35	11	14+9	9	1	0	0+1	0	4+2	2	3+1	0
21	MF	(Brazil) BRA	Alan Patrick	31	5	16+4	4	1	0	1	0	1+4	0	4	1
22	DF	(Ukraine) UKR	Mykola Matviyenko	29	1	19+1	1	0	0	1	0	3+1	0	4	0
23	MF	(Ukraine) UKR	Vladyslav Vakula	2	0	1+1	0	0	0	0	0	0	0	0	0
27	MF	(Brazil) BRA	Maycon	30	2	16+3	2	0+1	0	0	0	4+2	0	3+1	0
28	MF	(Brazil) BRA	Marquinhos Cipriano	8	0	6+2	0	0	0	0	0	0	0	0	0
30	GK	(Ukraine) UKR	Andriy Pyatov	7	0	4	0	1	0	1	0	1	0	0	0
31	DF	(Brazil) BRA	Ismaily	3	0	2	0	0	0	0	0	0	0	1	0
49	DF	(Brazil) BRA	Vitão	17	0	8+2	0	0	0	0	0	2+1	0	4	0
50	MF	(Ukraine) UKR	Serhiy Bolbat	8	0	3+3	0	1	0	0	0	0	0	0+1	0
59	FW	(Ukraine) UKR	Bohdan Viunnyk	6	0	1+4	0	0	0	0	0	0+1	0	0	0
61	MF	(Ukraine) UKR	Heorhiy Sudakov	14	1	2+8	1	0+1	0	0	0	0+1	0	0+2	0
70	MF	(Ukraine) UKR	Yevhen Konoplyanka	14	0	3+5	0	1	0	0+1	0	0	0	0+4	0
77	DF	(Ukraine) UKR	Valeriy Bondar	18	0	11	0	0	0	1	0	6	0	0	0
81	GK	(Ukraine) UKR	Anatoliy Trubin	30	0	21	0	0	0	0	0	5	0	4	0
91	MF	(Ukraine) UKR	Mykhailo Mudryk	3	0	0+3	0	0	0	0	0	0	0	0	0
99	MF	(Brazil) BRA	Fernando	23	1	2+15	1	1	0	0+1	0	0+2	0	0+2	0
Players away on loan:
Players who left Shakhtar Donetsk during the season:
7	MF	(Brazil) BRA	Taison	24	2	11+4	2	0+1	0	1	0	3+1	0	3	0
20	MF	(Ukraine) UKR	Viktor Kovalenko	11	4	3+5	4	0	0	0	0	2+1	0	0	0

=== Goalscorers ===
Place	Position	Nation	Number	Name	Premier League	Ukrainian Cup	Super Cup	Champions League	Europa League	Total
1	MF	(Israel)	19	Manor Solomon	9	0	0	2	0	11
2	FW	(Ukraine)	10	Júnior Moraes	6	0	1	0	2	9
3	MF	(Brazil)	14	Tetê	6	0	0	1	1	8
4	MF	(Brazil)	21	Alan Patrick	4	0	0	0	1	5
5	MF	(Ukraine)	20	Viktor Kovalenko	4	0	0	0	0	4
5	MF	(Brazil)	9	Dentinho	3	0	0	1	0	4
7	MF	(Ukraine)	11	Marlos	2	0	0	0	0	2
7	MF	(Brazil)	7	Taison	2	0	0	0	0	2
7	MF	(Brazil)	8	Marcos Antônio	2	0	0	0	0	2
7	DF	(Brazil)	2	Dodô	2	0	0	0	0	2
7	MF	(Brazil)	27	Maycon	2	0	0	0	0	2
7	MF	(Ukraine)	6	Taras Stepanenko	2	0	0	0	0	2
13	DF	(Ukraine)	4	Serhiy Kryvtsov	1	0	0	0	0	1
13	MF	(Ukraine)	61	Heorhiy Sudakov	1	0	0	0	0	1
13	MF	(Brazil)	99	Fernando	1	0	0	0	0	1
13	DF	(Ukraine)	22	Mykola Matviyenko	1	0	0	0	0	1
				Own goal	3	0	0	1	0	4
Total					51	0	1	5	4	61

=== Clean sheets ===
Place	Position	Nation	Number	Name	Premier League	Ukrainian Cup	Super Cup	Champions League	Europa League	Total
1	GK	(Ukraine)	81	Anatoliy Trubin	10	0	0	3	2	15
2	GK	(Ukraine)	30	Andriy Pyatov	1	0	0	0	0	1
TOTALS					11	0	0	3	2	16

=== Disciplinary record ===
Number	Nation	Position	Name	Premier League		Ukrainian Cup		Super Cup		Champions League		Europa League		Total	
Number	Nation	Position	Name	Booked	Sent off (straight red)	Booked	Sent off (straight red)	Booked	Sent off (straight red)	Booked	Sent off (straight red)	Booked	Sent off (straight red)	Booked	Sent off (straight red)
2	(Brazil)	DF	Dodô	3	0	0	0	0	0	0	0	0	0	3	0
4	(Ukraine)	DF	Serhiy Kryvtsov	2	0	0	0	0	0	0	0	0	0	2	0
5	(Georgia (country))	DF	Davit Khocholava	1	0	2	1	0	0	1	0	0	0	4	1
6	(Ukraine)	MF	Taras Stepanenko	4	0	0	0	0	0	1	0	0	0	5	0
8	(Brazil)	MF	Marcos Antônio	2	0	0	0	0	0	0	0	1	0	3	0
9	(Brazil)	MF	Dentinho	1	0	0	0	0	0	0	0	0	0	1	0
10	(Ukraine)	FW	Júnior Moraes	2	1	0	0	0	0	0	0	0	0	2	1
11	(Ukraine)	MF	Marlos	4	0	0	0	0	0	0	0	1	0	5	0
14	(Brazil)	MF	Tetê	1	0	0	0	0	0	0	0	0	0	1	0
15	(Ukraine)	MF	Viktor Korniyenko	1	0	0	0	0	0	1	0	0	0	2	0
19	(Israel)	MF	Manor Solomon	1	0	0	0	0	0	1	0	0	0	2	0
21	(Brazil)	MF	Alan Patrick	5	0	0	0	0	0	0	0	2	0	7	0
22	(Ukraine)	DF	Mykola Matviyenko	4	0	0	0	0	0	0	0	0	0	4	0
23	(Ukraine)	MF	Vladyslav Vakula	1	0	0	0	0	0	0	0	0	0	1	0
27	(Brazil)	MF	Maycon	4	0	0	0	0	0	0	0	1	0	5	0
28	(Brazil)	MF	Marquinhos Cipriano	1	0	0	0	0	0	0	0	0	0	1	0
31	(Brazil)	DF	Ismaily	1	0	0	0	0	0	0	0	0	0	1	0
49	(Brazil)	DF	Vitão	1	0	0	0	0	0	1	0	1	0	3	0
50	(Ukraine)	MF	Serhiy Bolbat	1	0	0	0	0	0	0	0	0	0	1	0
61	(Ukraine)	MF	Heorhiy Sudakov	0	0	1	0	0	0	0	0	0	0	1	0
77	(Ukraine)	DF	Valeriy Bondar	4	0	0	0	0	0	1	0	0	0	5	0
81	(Ukraine)	GK	Anatoliy Trubin	1	0	0	0	0	0	1	0	0	0	2	0
Players away on loan:
Players who left Shakhtar Donetsk during the season:
7	(Brazil)	MF	Taison	0	0	0	0	0	0	0	0	2	0	2	0
			TOTALS	45	2	3	1	0	0	7	0	8	0	63	3
