= Kudryk =

Kudryk or Kudrik (Ukrainian or Russian: Кудрик) is a gender-neutral Ukrainian surname. Notable people with the surname include:

- Oleh Kudryk (born 1996), Ukrainian football goalkeeper
- Peter Kudryk (born c. 1948), Canadian football player
