= Oleh Ocheretko =

Ukrainian footballer

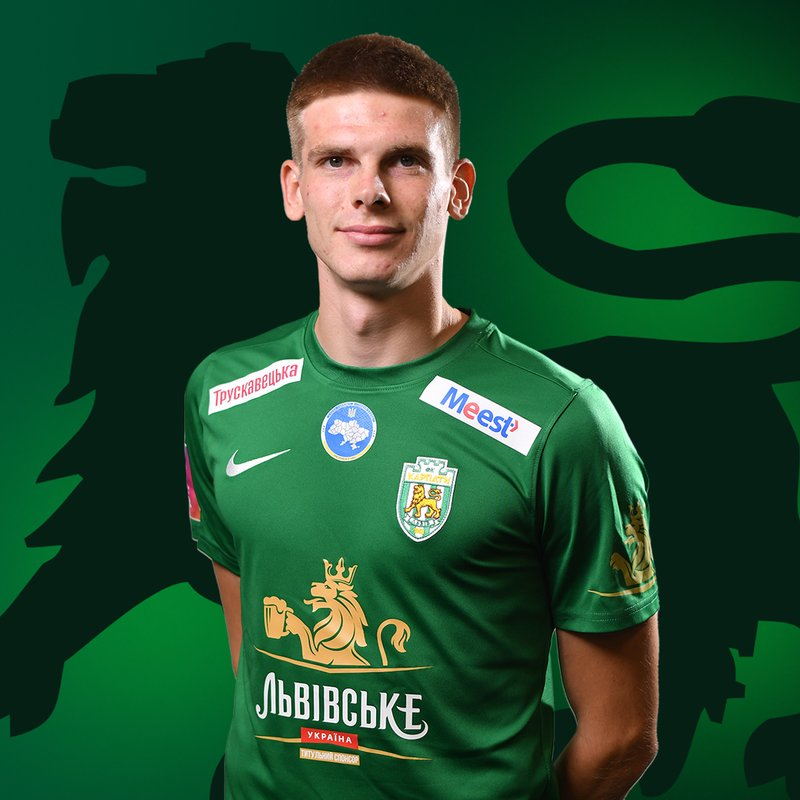
- Ocheretko with Karpaty Lviv in 2024

Personal information
- Full name: Oleh Andriiovych Ocheretko
- Date of birth: 25 May 2003 (age 23)
- Place of birth: Makiivka, Donetsk Oblast, Ukraine
- Height: 1.80 m (5 ft 11 in)
- Position: Midfielder

Team information
- Current team: Shakhtar Donetsk
- Number: 27

Youth career
- 2016–2020: Shakhtar Donetsk

Senior career*
Years	Team	Apps	(Gls)
2020–	Shakhtar Donetsk	53	(5)
2020–2022	→ Mariupol (loan)	27	(2)
2024	→ Dnipro-1 (loan)	13	(1)
2024–2025	→ Karpaty Lviv (loan)	26	(2)

International career^{‡}
2018–2019	Ukraine U16	6	(0)
2019–2020	Ukraine U17	6	(1)
2021	Ukraine U19	3	(0)
2021–2025	Ukraine U21	29	(4)
2024	Ukraine U23	6	(0)
2025–	Ukraine	14	(1)
Medal record
Men's football
Representing Ukraine
UEFA European Under-21 Championship
Bronze medal – third place	2023 Georgia-Romania
- * Club domestic league appearances and goals as of 30 October 2026 ‡ National team caps and goals as of 18 November 2026

Oleh Andriiovych Ocheretko (Ukrainian: Олег Андрійович Очеретько; born 25 May 2003) is a Ukrainian professional footballer who plays as a midfielder for Ukrainian Premier League club Shakhtar Donetsk and the Ukraine national team.

== Club career ==
Born in Makiivka, Donetsk Oblast, Ocheretko is a product of Shakhtar Donetsk youth sportive school system and signed a loan contract with FC Mariupol in the Ukrainian Premier League in September 2020.

He made his debut for FC Mariupol in the Ukrainian Premier League as a second half-time substitute in the drawing away match against Inhulets Petrove on 25 October 2020.

On 10 August 2024, Ocheretko was loaned by Karpaty Lviv.

== International career ==
He was selected in the squad to compete in the men's football tournament at the 2024 Summer Olympics. In May 2024, Ocheretko was called up by Ruslan Rotan to the Ukraine Olympic football team squad to play at the 2024 Maurice Revello Tournament in France.

On 5 September 2025, Ocheretko debuted for the senior national team in a 2026 FIFA World Cup qualifier against France.

== Career statistics ==
=== Club ===
As of match played 3 November 2026

Appearances and goals by club, season and competition
Club	Season	League			Ukrainian Cup		Europe		Other		Total	
Club	Season	Division	Apps	Goals	Apps	Goals	Apps	Goals	Apps	Goals	Apps	Goals
Shakhtar Donetsk	2020–21	Ukrainian Premier League	0	0	0	0	0	0	0	0	0	0
Shakhtar Donetsk	2022–23	Ukrainian Premier League	13	0	0	0	1 (Note: Appearances in UEFA Champions League)	0	0	0	14	0
Shakhtar Donetsk	2023–24	Ukrainian Premier League	3	0	1	1	0	0	—		4	1
Shakhtar Donetsk	2025–26	Ukrainian Premier League	28	3	1	0	17 (Note: Six appearances in UEFA Europa League, eleven appearances and one goal in UEFA Conference League)	1	—		46	4
Shakhtar Donetsk	2026–27	Ukrainian Premier League	9	1	1	0	4	0	—		14	1
Shakhtar Donetsk	Total		53	4	3	1	22	1	0	0	78	6
Mariupol (loan)	2020–21	Ukrainian Premier League	17	2	1	0	—		—		18	2
Mariupol (loan)	2021–22	Ukrainian Premier League	10	1	2	1	—		—		12	2
Mariupol (loan)	Total		27	3	3	1	—		—		30	4
Dnipro-1 (loan)	2023–24	Ukrainian Premier League	13	1	—		—		—		13	1
Karpaty Lviv (loan)	2024–25	Ukrainian Premier League	26	2	2	1	—		—		28	3
Career total			119	10	8	3	22	1	0	0	149	14

=== International ===
As of match played 17 November 2026

Appearances and goals by national team and year
National team	Year	Apps	Goals
Ukraine	2025	5	1
Ukraine	2026	9	0
Total		14	1

Scores and results list Ukraine's goal tally first.

List of international goals scored by Oleh Ocheretko
No.	Date	Venue	Opponent	Score	Result	Competition
1	10 October 2025	Laugardalsvöllur, Reykjavík, Iceland	Iceland	5–3	5–3	2026 FIFA World Cup qualification

== Honours ==
Shakhtar Donetsk

- Ukrainian Premier League: 2022–23, 2023–24
- Ukrainian Cup: 2023–24

Ukraine U21

- Toulon Tournament: 2024
