= Mykyta Kozytskyi =

Ukrainian footballer

Personal information
- Full name: Mykyta Hennadiyovych Kozytskyi
- Date of birth: 26 January 2002 (age 24)
- Place of birth: Sverdlovsk, Ukraine
- Height: 1.80 m (5 ft 11 in)
- Position: Midfielder

Team information
- Current team: SV Schwandorf-Ettmannsdorf

Youth career
- 2012–2015: Youth Sportive Schhol #2 Sverdlovsk
- 2015–2016: DVUFK Dnipropetrovsk
- 2016–2019: Azovstal Mariupol

Senior career*
Years	Team	Apps	(Gls)
2019–2022	Mariupol	2	(0)
2022–2023	Biali Sądów		
2023–	SV Schwandorf-Ettmannsdorf	2	(0)
- * Club domestic league appearances and goals as of 24 February 2024

Mykyta Hennadiyovych Kozytskyi (Ukrainian: Микита Геннадійович Козицький; born 26 January 2002) is a Ukrainian professional footballer who plays as a midfielder for German club SV Schwandorf-Ettmannsdorf.

== Career ==
Born in Sverdlovsk, Kozytskyi began his playing career in the local youth sportive school #2 and continued in the DVUFK Dnipro and Azovstal Mariupol youth sportive school systems.

He made his debut for FC Mariupol in the Ukrainian Premier League as a second half-time substituted player in the losing home match against Shakhtar Donetsk on 10 April 2021.
