= Vyacheslav Velyev =

Ukrainian footballer

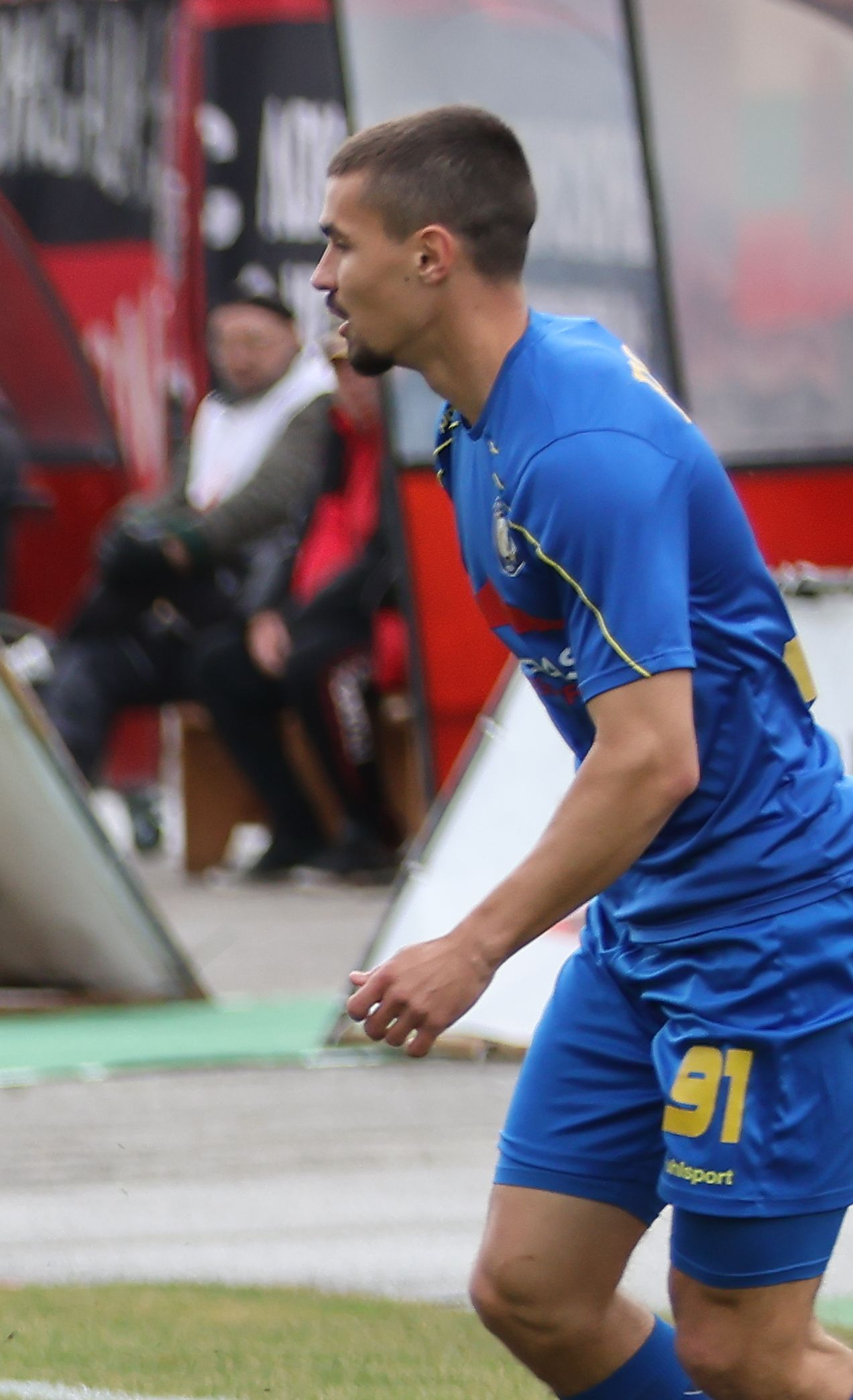

Personal information
- Full name: Vyacheslav Serhiyovych Velyev
- Date of birth: 21 May 2000 (age 26)
- Place of birth: Odesa, Ukraine
- Height: 1.81 m (5 ft 11 in)
- Position: Full-back

Team information
- Current team: Arda Kardzhali
- Number: 21

Youth career
- –2019: Chornomorets Odesa

Senior career*
Years	Team	Apps	(Gls)
2019–2020	Chornomorets-2 Odesa	5	(0)
2019–2020	Chornomorets Odesa	19	(0)
2020	Mariupol	3	(0)
2021	Hirnyk-Sport Horishni Plavni	11	(0)
2021–2022	Peremoha Dnipro	20	(1)
2022–2023	Pirin Blagoevgrad	30	(2)
2023–2025	Krumovgrad	46	(1)
2025–	Arda Kardzhali	45	(1)
- * Club domestic league appearances and goals as of 11 June 2026

Vyacheslav Velyev (born 21 May 2000) is a Ukrainian professional footballer who plays as a defender for Bulgarian First League club Arda Kardzhali.

== Career ==
=== Chornomorets ===
A product of the club's youth academy, Velyev made his league debut for the club on 10 August 2019, coming on as a 76th minute substitute for Volodymyr Tanchyk in a 1–0 away defeat to Mynai.

=== Krumovgrad ===
In July 2023, he signed a contract with newly promoted Bulgarian club Krumovgrad.

=== Arda ===
In December 2024, Velyev joined Arda Kardzhali.

== Personal life ==
Velev is of Bessarabian Bulgarian descent.
