= Danylo Sikan =

Ukrainian footballer

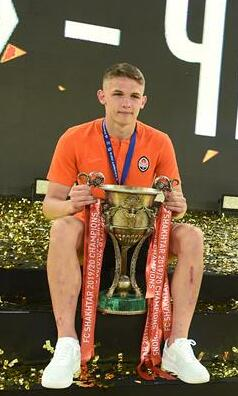
- Sikan with the Ukrainian Super Cup trophy in 2021

Personal information
- Full name: Danylo Yaroslavovych Sikan
- Date of birth: 16 April 2001 (age 25)
- Place of birth: Zhytomyr, Ukraine
- Height: 1.85 m (6 ft 1 in)
- Position: Forward

Team information
- Current team: Anderlecht
- Number: 14

Youth career
- –2014: Polissya Zhytomyr
- 2014–2018: Karpaty Lviv

Senior career*
Years	Team	Apps	(Gls)
2018–2019	Karpaty Lviv	1	(0)
2019–2025	Shakhtar Donetsk	87	(24)
2019	→ Mariupol (loan)	6	(0)
2020–2021	→ Mariupol (loan)	14	(4)
2022	→ Hansa Rostock (loan)	11	(1)
2025–2026	Trabzonspor	27	(4)
2026–	Anderlecht	18	(3)

International career^{‡}
2017–2018	Ukraine U17	5	(3)
2018–2019	Ukraine U19	11	(7)
2019	Ukraine U20	6	(4)
2019–2023	Ukraine U21	19	(9)
2024	Ukraine U23	9	(1)
2021–	Ukraine	12	(3)
Medal record
Men's football
Representing Ukraine
FIFA U-20 World Cup
Winner	2019 Poland
UEFA European Under-21 Championship
Bronze medal – third place	2023 Georgia-Romania
- * Club domestic league appearances and goals as of 25 October 2026 ‡ National team caps and goals as of 18 November 2026

Danylo Yaroslavovych Sikan (Ukrainian: Дани́ло Яросла́вович Сіка́н; born 16 April 2001) is a Ukrainian professional footballer who plays as a centre-forward for Anderlecht and the Ukraine national team.

== Club career ==
Sikan began playing football in Polissya Zhytomyr as a child. As a teenager, he began playing for Karpaty Lviv. He made his debut in the Ukrainian Premier League in a match against Zorya Luhansk on 12 August 2018, but then played in competitions for reserves. Later in the 2018-19 season, Sikan was loaned out to FC Mariupol.

Sikan joined Shakhtar Donetsk in 2019, debuting with a victory against his former club Karpaty on 4 August 2019. That season he played 7 matches for the senior side and made a debut at continental club competitions on 26 November 2019 in an away tie against Manchester City. Struggling to get on a scoreboard, Sikan was placed back in competitions among reserves.

For the 2020–21 season, Sikan was loaned again to Mariupol, where he made his debut in the Ukrainian Cup competitions.

On 31 January 2022, he joined Hansa Rostock in the 2. Bundesliga league on loan until the end of the season.

On 4 October 2023, he scored his first Champions League goals, by netting a brace for Shakhtar in a 3–2 away win over Royal Antwerp. His performance earned him the title of Player of the Match. A month later, on 7 November, he scored the only goal in a 1–0 win over Barcelona at Volksparkstadion in Hamburg.

On 21 January 2026, Sikan moved to the Belgian Pro League club Anderlecht.

== International career ==
Sikan was a part of the Ukraine national U-20 football team that won the 2019 FIFA U-20 World Cup.

Sikan scored his first goal for Ukraine on 1 September 2021 against Kazakhstan, the day of his debut for the team, coming on as an 82nd minute substitute. The match ended in a 2–2 draw.

== Career statistics ==
=== Club ===
As of match played 25 October 2026

Appearances and goals by club, season and competition
Club	Season	League			National cup (Note: Includes Ukrainian Cup, Turkish Cup, Belgian Cup)		Europe		Other		Total	
Club	Season	Division	Apps	Goals	Apps	Goals	Apps	Goals	Apps	Goals	Apps	Goals
Karpaty Lviv	2018–19	Ukrainian Premier League	1	0	0	0	—		—		1	0
Shakhtar Donetsk	2019–20	Ukrainian Premier League	7	0	0	0	1 (Note: Appearance(s) in UEFA Champions League)	0	0	0	8	0
Shakhtar Donetsk	2021–22	Ukrainian Premier League	11	2	0	0	2	0	1 (Note: Appearance in Ukrainian Super Cup)	0	14	2
Shakhtar Donetsk	2022–23	Ukrainian Premier League	26	9	—		7 (Note: Four appearances in UEFA Champions League, three appearances in UEFA Europa League)	0	—		33	9
Shakhtar Donetsk	2023–24	Ukrainian Premier League	28	10	4	2	8 (Note: Six appearances in UEFA Champions League, two appearances in UEFA Europa League)	4	—		42	16
Shakhtar Donetsk	2024–25	Ukrainian Premier League	13	3	1	0	5	1	—		19	4
Shakhtar Donetsk	Total		87	24	5	2	23	5	1	0	116	31
Mariupol (loan)	2018–19	Ukrainian Premier League	6	0	0	0	—		—		6	0
Mariupol (loan)	2020–21	Ukrainian Premier League	14	4	2	0	—		—		16	4
Hansa Rostock (loan)	2021–22	2. Bundesliga	11	1	0	0	—		—		11	1
Trabzonspor	2024–25	Süper Lig	14	3	4	0	—		—		18	3
Trabzonspor	2025–26	Süper Lig	13	1	3	3	—		—		16	4
Trabzonspor	Total		27	4	7	3	—		—		34	7
Anderlecht	2025–26	Belgian Pro League	9	2	2	0	—		—		11	2
Anderlecht	2026–27	Belgian Pro League	9	1	0	0	9 (Note: Appearances in UEFA Europa League)	5	—		18	6
Anderlecht	Total		18	3	2	9	9	5	—		29	8
Career total			160	36	16	5	32	10	1	0	213	51

=== International ===
As of match played 17 November 2026

Appearances and goals by national team and year
National team	Year	Apps	Goals
Ukraine	2021	4	1
Ukraine	2022	2	0
Ukraine	2023	1	0
Ukraine	2024	0	0
Ukraine	2025	0	0
Ukraine	2026	5	2
Total		12	3

Scores and results list Ukraine's goal tally first, score column indicates score after each Sikan goal.

List of international goals scored by Danylo Sikan
No.	Date	Venue	Opponent	Score	Result	Competition
1	1 September 2021	Astana Arena, Nur-Sultan, Kazakhstan	Kazakhstan	2–1	2–2	2022 FIFA World Cup qualification
2	25 September 2026	Puskás Aréna, Budapest, Hungary	Hungary	1–0	1–0	2026–27 UEFA Nations League B
3	17 November 2026	Košická futbalová aréna, Košice, Slovakia	Georgia	1–0	1–0	2026–27 UEFA Nations League B

== Honours ==
Shakhtar Donetsk

- Ukrainian Premier League: 2019–20, 2023–24
- Ukrainian Cup: 2023–24
- Ukrainian Super Cup: 2021

Ukraine U20

- FIFA U-20 World Cup: 2019

Ukraine U23

- Toulon Tournament: 2024

Individual

- FIFA U-20 World Cup Silver Boot: 2019
