= Artem Bondarenko =

Ukrainian footballer

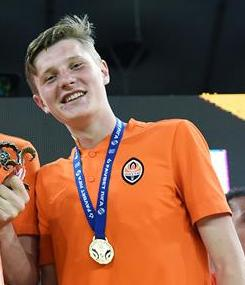

Personal information
- Full name: Artem Yuriyovych Bondarenko
- Date of birth: 21 August 2000 (age 26)
- Place of birth: Cherkasy, Ukraine
- Height: 1.82 m (6 ft 0 in)
- Position: Midfielder

Team information
- Current team: Al-Ahli (on loan from Shakhtar Donetsk)
- Number: 19

Youth career
- 200?–2012: Youth Sportive School Cherkasy
- 2013–2014: Dnipro Dnipropetrovsk
- 2014: Dnipro-80 Cherkasy
- 2015–2016: Piddubny Olympic College
- 2016–2020: Shakhtar Donetsk

Senior career*
Years	Team	Apps	(Gls)
2020–	Shakhtar Donetsk	118	(30)
2020–2021	→ Mariupol (loan)	21	(8)
2026–	→ Al-Ahli (loan)	6	(3)

International career^{‡}
2018–2019	Ukraine U19	8	(1)
2020–2023	Ukraine U21	23	(5)
2025–	Ukraine	5	(0)
- * Club domestic league appearances and goals as of 30 October 2026 ‡ National team caps and goals as of 31 May 2026

Artem Yuriyovych Bondarenko (Ukrainian: Артем Юрійович Бондаренко; born 21 August 2000) is a Ukrainian professional footballer who plays as a midfielder for Saudi Pro League club Al-Ahli, on loan from Ukrainian Premier League club Shakhtar Donetsk and the Ukraine national team.

== Career ==
Bondarenko is a product of the different youth sportive schools, who signed a professional contract with FC Shakhtar Donetsk in the Ukrainian Premier League in 2020.

He played in the Ukrainian Premier League Reserves and made his debut for Shakhtar Donetsk in the Ukrainian Premier League in a losing match against FC Vorskla Poltava on 1 March 2020.

In 21 August 2026, Saudi Pro League club Al-Ahli signed Artem Bondarenko from Shakhtar Donetsk on a loan deal with a buy option for the remainder of the 2026-27 season.

== Career statistics ==
=== Club ===
As of match played 16 August 2026

Appearances and goals by club, season and competition
Club	Season	League			Ukrainian Cup		Continental		Other		Total	
Club	Season	Division	Apps	Goals	Apps	Goals	Apps	Goals	Apps	Goals	Apps	Goals
Shakhtar Donetsk	2019–20	Ukrainian Premier League	5	0	0	0	0	0	0	0	5	0
Shakhtar Donetsk	2021–22	Ukrainian Premier League	6	1	1	0	2 (Note: Appearance in UEFA Champions League)	0	0	0	9	1
Shakhtar Donetsk	2022–23	Ukrainian Premier League	28	9	0	0	10 (Note: Six appearances in UEFA Champions League, four appearances and one goal in UEFA Europa League)	1	0	0	38	10
Shakhtar Donetsk	2023–24	Ukrainian Premier League	21	4	4	2	6 (Note: Four appearances in UEFA Champions League, two appearances in UEFA Europa League)	0	0	0	31	6
Shakhtar Donetsk	2024–25	Ukrainian Premier League	29	12	4	0	8	0	0	0	41	12
Shakhtar Donetsk	2025–26	Ukrainian Premier League	26	4	1	0	15 (Note: Six appearances in UEFA Europa League, nine appearances and one goal in UEFA Conference League)	1	—		42	5
Shakhtar Donetsk	2026–27	Ukrainian Premier League	3	0	0	0	0	0	—		3	0
Shakhtar Donetsk	Total		118	30	10	2	41	2	0	0	169	34
Mariupol (loan)	2020–21	Ukrainian Premier League	21	8	2	0	—		—		23	8
Career total			139	38	12	2	41	2	0	0	192	42

=== International ===
As of match played 31 May 2026

Appearances and goals by national team and year
National team	Year	Apps	Goals
Ukraine	2025	4	0
Ukraine	2026	1	0
Total		5	0

== Honours ==
Shakhtar Donetsk

- Ukrainian Premier League: 2019–20, 2022–23, 2023–24
- Ukrainian Cup: 2023–24, 2024–25
- Ukrainian Super Cup: 2021

Individual

- Top scorer: 2018–19 Ukrainian Premier League U-19 competitions
