= Illya Ukhan =

Ukrainian footballer

Personal information
- Full name: Illya Pavlovych Ukhan
- Date of birth: 1 June 2003 (age 23)
- Place of birth: Khartsyzk, Ukraine
- Height: 1.78 m (5 ft 10 in)
- Position: Defender

Team information
- Current team: Poltava
- Number: 24

Youth career
- 2015–2017: DVUFK Dnipropetrovsk
- 2017–2019: Dnipro
- 2019–2020: Mariupol

Senior career*
Years	Team	Apps	(Gls)
2020–2021	Mariupol	1	(0)
2021–2022	Kolos Kovalivka	0	(0)
2022–2023	Kryvbas Kryvyi Rih	0	(0)
2023–2024	Chornomorets Odesa	1	(0)
2024–2025	Oleksandriya	4	(0)
2026–	Poltava	11	(0)
- * Club domestic league appearances and goals as of 3 June 2026

Illya Pavlovych Ukhan (Ukrainian: Ілля Павлович Ухань; born 1 June 2003) is a Ukrainian professional footballer who plays as a defender for Poltava.

== Career ==
Born in Donetsk Oblast, Ukhan is a product of the DVUFK, Dnipro and Mariupol youth sportive school systems.

He played for FC Mariupol in the Ukrainian Premier League Reserves and made his debut for FC Mariupol in the Ukrainian Premier League as a start squad player in the losing home match against FC Shakhtar Donetsk on 10 April 2021.
