= Mykyta Peterman =

Ukrainian footballer (born 1999)

Personal information
- Full name: Mykyta Yevhenovych Peterman
- Date of birth: 12 June 1999 (age 27)
- Place of birth: Berdiansk, Ukraine
- Height: 1.89 m (6 ft 2 in)
- Position: Defensive midfielder

Team information
- Current team: FC Bishkek City
- Number: 99

Youth career
- 2011–2012: DYuSSh Berdyansk
- 2012–2016: Azovstal Mariupol

Senior career*
Years	Team	Apps	(Gls)
2016–2022	Mariupol	33	(0)
2016–2017	→ Illichivets-2 Mariupol	18	(0)
2022	→ Zagłębie Sosnowiec (loan)	5	(0)
2022–2023	Laçi	6	(0)
2023–2024	Turan	22	(0)
2024	Khatlon	8	(0)
- * Club domestic league appearances and goals

Mykyta Yevhenovych Peterman (Ukrainian: Микита Євгенович Петерман; born 12 June 1999) is a Ukrainian professional footballer who plays as a defensive midfielder.

== Career ==
Peterman is a product of Berdyansk and Azovstal Mariupol youth academies.

He made his professional debut for FC Mariupol in the Ukrainian Premier League as a substitute against FC Shakhtar Donetsk on 26 May 2019.

On 4 April 2022, Peterman joined Zagłębie Sosnowiec in Poland on loan until the end of the season.
