= Peter Kudryk =

Canadian football player (born 1948)

Profile
- Position: Defensive end

Personal information
- Born: c. 1948 (age 77–78)
- Listed height: 6 ft 4 in (1.93 m)
- Listed weight: 255 lb (116 kg)

Career history
- 1972: Hamilton Tiger-Cats

Awards and highlights
- Grey Cup champion (1972)

Peter Kudryk (born c. 1948) was a Canadian football player who played for the Hamilton Tiger-Cats. He won the Grey Cup with them in 1972. He played junior football in Brantford, Ontario.
