= Ivan Koshkosh =

Ukrainian footballer

Personal information
- Full name: Ivan Arkadiyovych Koshkosh
- Date of birth: 8 April 2001 (age 25)
- Place of birth: Mariupol, Ukraine
- Height: 1.77 m (5 ft 10 in)
- Position: Midfielder

Team information
- Current team: Tauras

Youth career
- 2011–2018: Azovstal Mariupol

Senior career*
Years	Team	Apps	(Gls)
2018–2022	Mariupol	2	(0)
2023	Tukums 2000	14	(0)
2024	TransINVEST	12	(0)
2024–2025	Dainava	44	(0)
2025–	Tauras	0	(0)
- * Club domestic league appearances and goals as of 24 January 2026

Ivan Arkadiyovych Koshkosh (Ukrainian: Іван Аркадійович Кошкош; born 8 April 2001) is a Ukrainian professional footballer who plays as a midfielder for Lithuanian club Tauras.

== Career ==
Born in Mariupol, Koshkosh is a product of the local Azovstal Mariupol youth sportive school system.

He made his debut for FC Mariupol in the Ukrainian Premier League as a start squad player in the losing home match against FC Shakhtar Donetsk on 10 April 2021.

On 16 January 2026 Ivan Koshkosh signed with lithuanian Tauras Club.
