= Mark Mampassi =

Ukrainian footballer

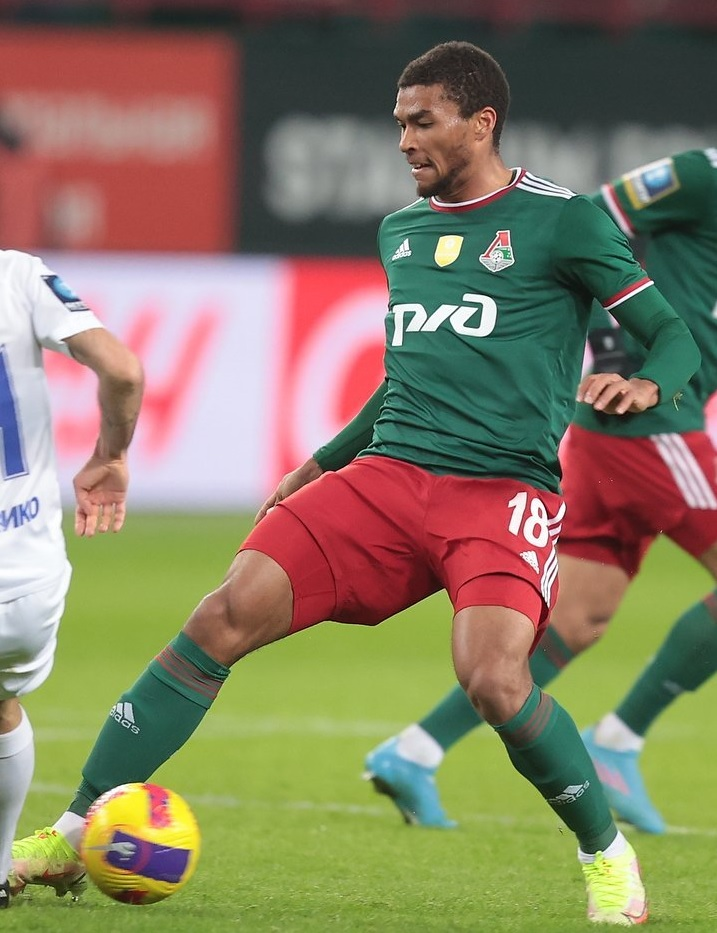
- Mampassi with Lokomotiv Moscow in 2022

Personal information
- Full name: Mark Rene Mampassi
- Date of birth: 12 March 2003 (age 23)
- Place of birth: Donetsk, Ukraine
- Height: 1.85 m (6 ft 1 in)
- Position: Centre-back

Team information
- Current team: Rosenborg
- Number: 23

Youth career
- 2010–2020: Shakhtar Donetsk

Senior career*
Years	Team	Apps	(Gls)
2020–2021	Shakhtar Donetsk	0	(0)
2021	→ Mariupol (loan)	21	(0)
2021–2026	Lokomotiv Moscow	18	(0)
2023	→ Antalyaspor (loan)	0	(0)
2023–2025	→ Kortrijk (loan)	35	(1)
2026	→ Turan Tovuz (loan)	11	(0)
2026–	Rosenborg	4	(0)

International career
2018–2019	Ukraine U16	2	(0)
2019–2020	Ukraine U17	11	(2)
2021	Ukraine U19	3	(0)
- * Club domestic league appearances and goals as of 18 October 2026

Mark Rene Mampassi (Russian: Марк Рене Мампасси; Ukrainian: Марк Рене Мампассі; born 12 March 2003) is a Ukrainian professional footballer who plays as a centre-back who plays as a centre-back for Eliteserien club Rosenborg.

== Career ==
Born in Donetsk, Mampassi began his career with the Shakhtar Donetsk academy system in 2010.

He played in the Ukrainian Premier League Reserves but never made his debut for Shakhtar Donetsk's senior squad. In February 2021, Mampassi signed a half-year loan contract with the Ukrainian Premier League side FC Mariupol and made the debut in a losing home match against FC Vorskla Poltava on 6 March 2021.

On 17 December 2021, he signed a 5-year contract with the Russian Premier League club FC Lokomotiv Moscow.

On 10 February 2023, Mampassi moved on loan to Antalyaspor in Turkey, with an option to buy.

On 6 September 2023, Lokomotiv sent Mampassi on a season-long loan to Belgian Pro League side Kortrijk. On 9 July 2024, he returned to Kortrijk on another season-long loan, with an option to buy. As his 2024–25 season was marred by injuries, the purchase option was ultimately not exercised, and he returned to Lokomotiv.

On 10 February 2026, Azerbaijan Premier League club Turan Tovuz announced the signing of Mampassi on loan from Lokomotiv Moscow until the end of the season.

On 31 July 2026, his contract with Lokomotiv was mutually terminated.

On 8 August 2026, Mampassi signed with Rosenborg in Norway until the end of 2029.

== Personal life ==
Born in Ukraine, Mampassi is of Congolese descent. He holds Russian citizenship as he was registered as a non-foreign player by the Russian Premier League.

== Career statistics ==
As of match played 28 October 2026

Appearances and goals by club, season and competition
Club	Season	League			National cup (Note: Includes Ukrainian Cup, Russian Cup, Belgian Cup, Azerbaijan Cup)		Continental		Other		Total	
Club	Season	Division	Apps	Goals	Apps	Goals	Apps	Goals	Apps	Goals	Apps	Goals
Shakhtar Donetsk	2020–21	Ukrainian Premier League	0	0	—		0	0	—		0	0
Mariupol (loan)	2020–21	Ukrainian Premier League	6	0	—		—		—		6	0
Mariupol (loan)	2021–22	Ukrainian Premier League	15	0	1	0	—		—		16	0
Mariupol (loan)	Total		21	0	1	0	0	0	0	0	22	0
Lokomotiv Moscow	2021–22	Russian Premier League	11	0	1	0	—		—		12	0
Lokomotiv Moscow	2022–23	Russian Premier League	7	0	2	0	—		—		9	0
Lokomotiv Moscow	2025–26	Russian Premier League	0	0	0	0	—		—		0	0
Lokomotiv Moscow	Total		18	0	3	0	0	0	0	0	21	0
Antalyaspor (loan)	2022–23	Süper Lig	0	0	0	0	—		—		0	0
Kortrijk (loan)	2023–24	Belgian Pro League	21	0	1	0	—		8 (Note: Six appearances in relegation play-offs, two appearances in promotion/relegation play-offs)	0	30	0
Kortrijk (loan)	2024–25	Belgian Pro League	14	1	0	0	—		0	0	14	1
Kortrijk (loan)	Total		35	1	1	0	0	0	8	0	44	1
Turan Tovuz (loan)	2025–26	Azerbaijan Premier League	11	0	0	0	—		—		11	0
Rosenborg	2026	Eliteserien	4	0	3	0	—		—		7	0
Career total			89	1	8	0	0	0	8	0	105	1
