= Danylo Dmytriyev =

Ukrainian footballer

Personal information
- Full name: Danylo Mykolayovych Dmytriyev
- Date of birth: 22 October 2002 (age 24)
- Place of birth: Ukraine
- Height: 1.71 m (5 ft 7 in)
- Position: Left winger

Team information
- Current team: FC Hirnyk-Sport
- Number: 11

Youth career
- 2015–2019: Mariupol

Senior career*
Years	Team	Apps	(Gls)
2019–2021	Mariupol	1	(0)
2021–2023	Mariupol	15	(1)
2023–	Hirnyk-Sport Horishni Plavni	42	(2)
- * Club domestic league appearances and goals as of 5 May 2025

Danylo Mykolayovych Dmytriyev (Ukrainian: Данило Миколайович Дмитрієв; born 22 October 2002) is a Ukrainian professional footballer who plays as a left winger for Ukrainian club Hirnyk-Sport Horishni Plavni.
