= Kyrylo Melichenko =

Ukrainian footballer

Personal information
- Full name: Kyrylo Oleksandrovych Melichenko
- Date of birth: 7 June 1999 (age 27)
- Place of birth: Svitlovodsk, Ukraine
- Height: 1.76 m (5 ft 9 in)
- Position: Defender

Team information
- Current team: Dinamo Batumi
- Number: 21

Youth career
- 2009–2010: FC Kyiv
- 2010–2017: Arsenal Kyiv
- 2017–2018: Shakhtar Donetsk

Senior career*
Years	Team	Apps	(Gls)
2018–2020	Shakhtar Donetsk	0	(0)
2020	→ Mynai (loan)	11	(0)
2021–2022	Mariupol	22	(1)
2022–2024	Dynamo Dresden	18	(0)
2025–	Dinamo Batumi	9	(0)

International career^{‡}
2016	Ukraine U18	2	(0)
- * Club domestic league appearances and goals as of 10 December 2025 ‡ National team caps and goals as of 18 August 2022

Kyrylo Melichenko (Ukrainian: Кирило Олександрович Меліченко; born 7 June 1999) is a Ukrainian professional footballer who plays as a defender for Dinamo Batumi.

== Career ==
Born in Kirovohrad Oblast, Melichenko began his career in the Kyiv's youth sportive schools, until his transfer to the FC Shakhtar youth sportive system in 2017.

He played in the Ukrainian Premier League Reserves and never made his debut for the senior Shakhtar Donetsk's squad. In August 2020 Melichenko signed one-year loan contract with the Ukrainian Premier League's debutant FC Mynai and made the debut for this team as a start squad player in a winning home match against FC Oleksandriya on 13 September 2020.

On 21 July 2022, he moved to 3. Liga club Dynamo Dresden.
