= Nazariy Muravskyi =

Ukrainian footballer

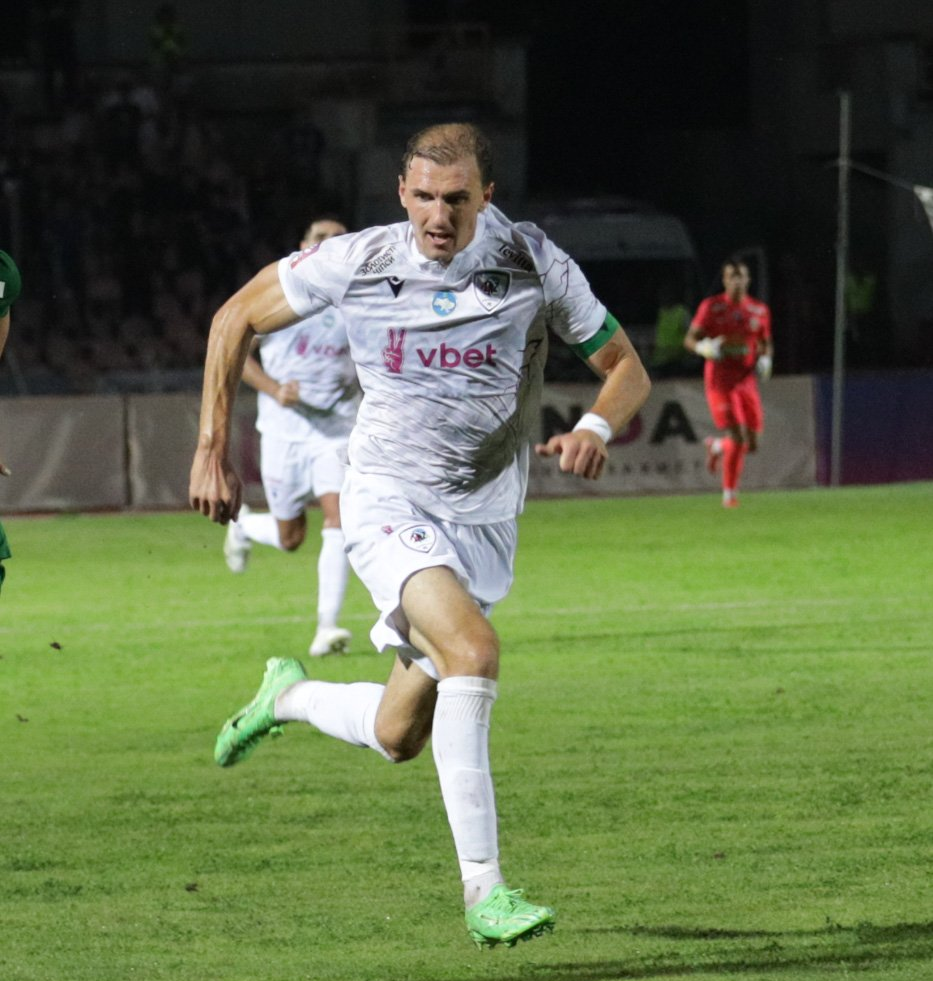

Personal information
- Full name: Nazariy Volodymyrovych Muravskyi
- Date of birth: 3 February 2000 (age 26)
- Place of birth: Kashperivka, Zhytomyr Oblast, Ukraine
- Height: 1.90 m (6 ft 3 in)
- Position: Defender

Team information
- Current team: LNZ Cherkasy
- Number: 34

Youth career
- Youth Sportive School Baranivka
- 201?–2013: Metalurh Donetsk
- 2013–2015: Youth Sportive School#15 Kyiv
- 2015–2016: Arsenal Schaslyve
- 2016–2017: Youth Sportive School#15 Kyiv
- 2017: Shakhtar Donetsk

Senior career*
Years	Team	Apps	(Gls)
2017–2022	Shakhtar Donetsk	0	(0)
2020–2021	→ Mariupol (loan)	14	(0)
2022–2023	Lviv	14	(0)
2023	→ LNZ Cherkasy (loan)	7	(1)
2023–	LNZ Cherkasy	78	(1)

International career^{‡}
2018–2019	Ukraine U19	6	(0)
2021	Ukraine U21	3	(0)
- * Club domestic league appearances and goals as of 3 June 2026 ‡ National team caps and goals as of 9 July 2023

Nazariy Volodymyrovych Muravskyi (Ukrainian: Назарій Володимирович Муравський; born 3 February 2000) is a Ukrainian professional footballer who plays as a defender for LNZ Cherkasy.

== Career ==
Born in the Baranivka Raion of the Zhytomyr Oblast, Muravskyi began to play in the local Youth Sportive School Baranivka and continued his youth career in Kyiv and Donetsk youth sportive school systems.

After joined Shakhtar Donetsk academy in April 2017, and played almost three years for the FC Shakhtar Donetsk Reserves and Youth Team in the Ukrainian Premier League Reserves Championship and in February 2020 went on loan to FC Mariupol in the Ukrainian Premier League. Muravskyi made his début for FC Mariupol in the Ukrainian Premier League as a substituted player in a losing away match against FC Desna Chernihiv on 29 February 2020.

== International career ==
Muravskyi was a part of the Ukraine national under-18 football team, but not made debut for this youth representation, instead it happened in May 2018 for the Ukraine national under-19 football team.
