= Danylo Sahutkin =

Russian and Ukrainian footballer

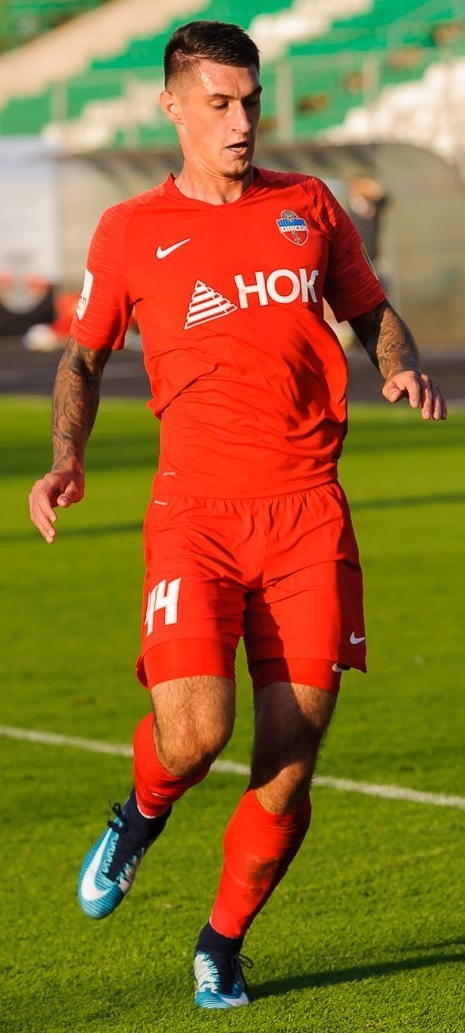
- Sahutkin with Yenisey Krasnoyarsk in 2019

Personal information
- Full name: Danylo Valeriyovych Sahutkin
- Date of birth: 19 April 1996 (age 30)
- Place of birth: Sevastopol, Ukraine
- Height: 1.94 m (6 ft 4 in)
- Position: Defender

Team information
- Current team: KDV Tomsk
- Number: 3

Youth career
- 2008–2010: SDYuShOR-5 Sevastopol
- 2010–2013: RVUFK Kyiv

Senior career*
Years	Team	Apps	(Gls)
2013–2020	Shakhtar Donetsk	0	(0)
2014	→ Shakhtar-3 Donetsk	11	(1)
2018–2019	→ Arsenal Kyiv (loan)	18	(0)
2019	→ Yenisey Krasnoyarsk (loan)	2	(0)
2020	→ Mariupol (loan)	8	(1)
2021	Mariupol	4	(0)
2021–2023	Akron Tolyatti	41	(4)
2023–2024	Neftekhimik Nizhnekamsk	25	(0)
2025–	KDV Tomsk	32	(3)

International career
2015	Ukraine U20	1	(0)
2016	Ukraine U21	3	(0)
- * Club domestic league appearances and goals as of 1 November 2026

Danylo Valeriyovych Sahutkin (Ukrainian: Данило Валерійович Сагуткін; Russian: Данила Валерьевич Сагуткин; born 19 April 1996) is a Russian-Ukrainian football player who plays for Russian club KDV Tomsk.

== Club career ==
He made his Ukrainian Second League debut for FC Shakhtar-3 Donetsk on 2 August 2014 in a game against FC Krystal Kherson.
