= Serhiy Horbunov =

Ukrainian footballer

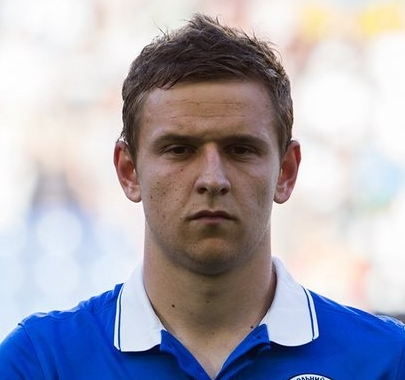

Personal information
- Full name: Serhiy Olehovych Horbunov
- Date of birth: 14 March 1994 (age 32)
- Place of birth: Mariupol, Ukraine
- Height: 1.75 m (5 ft 9 in)
- Position: Midfielder

Youth career
- 2007–2012: Illichivets Mariupol

Senior career*
Years	Team	Apps	(Gls)
2012–2015	Dnipro Dnipropetrovsk	1	(0)
2015–2016	Shakhtar Donetsk	0	(0)
2016–2021	Mariupol	54	(3)
2017	→ Illichivets-2 Mariupol	2	(0)
2021–2022	Metalist Kharkiv	14	(0)
2022–2024	Dnipro-1	21	(0)
2023	→ Karpaty Lviv (loan)	2	(0)

International career^{‡}
2015	Ukraine U20	1	(0)
2015	Ukraine U21	3	(0)
- * Club domestic league appearances and goals as of 17 March 2025 ‡ National team caps and goals as of 29 June 2017

Serhiy Olehovych Horbunov (Ukrainian: Сергій Олегович Горбунов; born 14 March 1994) is a Ukrainian professional footballer who plays as a midfielder.

== Career ==
Horbunov is a product of the FC Illichivets Mariupol Youth Sportive School System.

He made his debut for FC Dnipro in the match against FC Shakhtar Donetsk on 23 May 2015 in the Ukrainian Premier League.

In March 2023 he moved to Karpaty Lviv.
