= Ihor Kyryukhantsev =

Ukrainian footballer

Personal information
- Full name: Ihor Olehovych Kyryukhantsev
- Date of birth: 29 January 1996 (age 30)
- Place of birth: Makiivka, Ukraine
- Height: 1.67 m (5 ft 6 in)
- Position: Defender

Team information
- Current team: Epitsentr Kamianets-Podilskyi
- Number: 70

Youth career
- 2008–2013: Shakhtar Donetsk

Senior career*
Years	Team	Apps	(Gls)
2013–2022	Shakhtar Donetsk	1	(0)
2017–2021	→ Mariupol (loan)	72	(3)
2021	→ Oleksandriya (loan)	10	(1)
2022–2025	Zorya Luhansk	52	(7)
2025-	Epitsentr Kamianets-Podilskyi	23	(0)

International career^{‡}
2011–2012	Ukraine U16	13	(0)
2012–2013	Ukraine U17	14	(0)
2013–2014	Ukraine U18	11	(0)
2014–2015	Ukraine U19	19	(0)
2016	Ukraine U20	1	(0)
2016–2018	Ukraine U21	14	(1)
- * Club domestic league appearances and goals as of 3 June 2026 ‡ National team caps and goals as of 29 September 2022

Ihor Olehovych Kyryukhantsev (Ukrainian: Ігор Олегович Кирюханцев; born 29 January 1996) is a Ukrainian professional footballer who plays as defender for Epitsentr Kamianets-Podilskyi.

== Career ==
Kyrykhantsev is a product of the FC Shakhtar youth academy and signed a contract with FC Shakhtar Donetsk in the Ukrainian Premier League in 2013.

He played in the Ukrainian Premier League Reserves and made his debut for Shakhtar Donetsk in the Ukrainian Premier League in a match against FC Oleksandriya on 31 May 2017.
