= Oleh Kudryk =

Ukrainian footballer

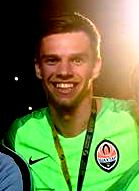

Personal information
- Full name: Oleh Teodoziyovych Kudryk
- Date of birth: 17 October 1996 (age 30)
- Place of birth: Lviv, Ukraine
- Height: 1.85 m (6 ft 1 in)
- Position: Goalkeeper

Team information
- Current team: Polissya Zhytomyr
- Number: 1

Youth career
- 2009–2011: Lviv
- 2011–2016: Shakhtar Donetsk

Senior career*
Years	Team	Apps	(Gls)
2016–2020	Shakhtar Donetsk	2	(0)
2019–2020	→ Karpaty Lviv (loan)	11	(0)
2020	→ Mariupol (loan)	0	(0)
2020–2022	Mariupol	22	(0)
2022–	Polissya Zhytomyr	41	(0)
- * Club domestic league appearances and goals as of 19 December 2025

Oleh Teodoziyovych Kudryk (Ukrainian: Олег Теодозійович Кудрик; born 17 October 1996) is a Ukrainian professional footballer who plays as a goalkeeper for Polissya Zhytomyr.

== Career ==
Kudryk started playing football at Lviv, then moved to the academy of Shakhtar Donetsk. He performed in the U-19 Championship, which became the bronze and silver medal in two seasons. In the 2014-2015 season, he played for the U-21 team. In 2016 he was part of the senior team.

He made his debut for Shakhtar Donetsk in the Ukrainian Premier League in a match against Oleksandriya on 31 May 2017.

== Honours ==
=== Club ===
Shakhtar

- Ukrainian Premier League: 2016–17, 2017–18, 2018–19
- Ukrainian Cup: 2016–17, 2017–18, 2018–19
- Ukrainian Super Cup: 2017
