= 2017–18 Ukrainian Premier League =

27th season of top-tier football league in Vyshcha Liha

Ukrainian Premier League
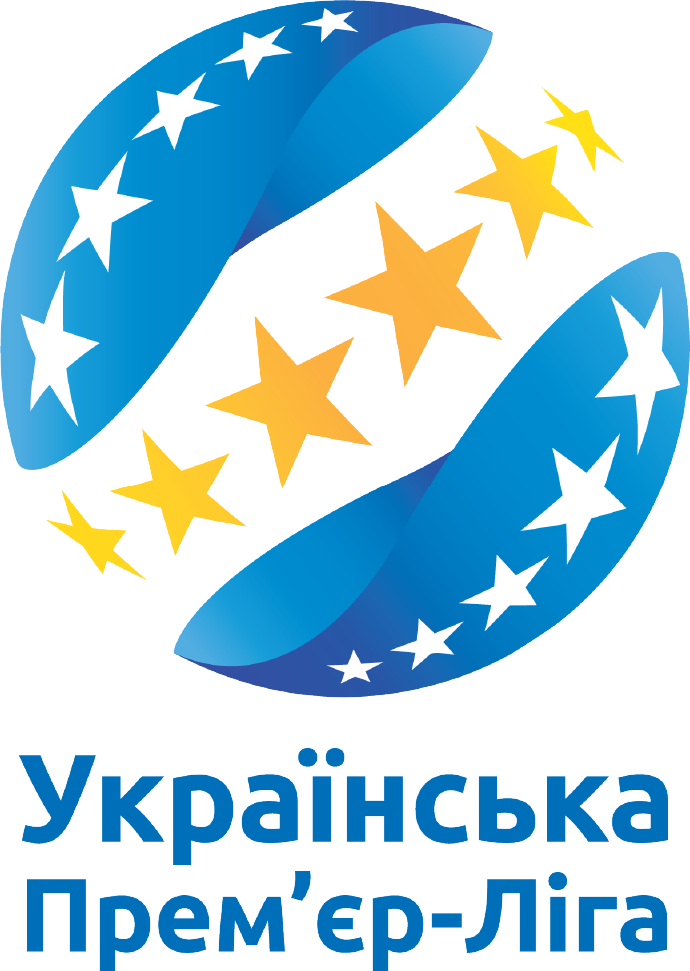
- Official logo
- Season: 2017–18
- Dates: 16 July 2017 – 19 May 2018
- Champions: Shakhtar Donetsk; 11th title
- Champions League: Shakhtar Donetsk; Dynamo Kyiv
- Europa League: Vorskla Poltava; Zorya Luhansk; Mariupol
- Matches: 183
- Goals: 407 (2.22 per match)
- Top goalscorer: 21 – Facundo Ferreyra (Shakhtar)
- Biggest home win: 5 – Dynamo 5–0 Karpaty (Round 3); Zorya 5–0 Chornomorets (Round 7); Shakhtar 5–0 Chornomorets (Round 20); Shakhtar 5–0 Zirka (Round 21)
- Biggest away win: 5 – Karpaty 1–6 Veres (Round 8)
- Highest scoring: 8 – Zorya 4–4 Dynamo (Round 11)
- Longest winning run: 6 – Shakhtar (Rounds 3-8)
- Longest unbeaten run: 13 – Shakhtar (Rounds 3-15)
- Longest winless run: 17 – Stal (Rounds 3-19)
- Longest losing run: 7 – Stal (Rounds 3-9)
- Highest attendance: 38,618 – Dynamo–Shakhtar (Round 13)
- Lowest attendance: 0 – 3 games
- All statistics correct as of 9 March 2018.

The 2017–18 Ukrainian Premier League season was the 27th top level football club competitions since the fall of the Soviet Union and the tenth since the establishment of the Ukrainian Premier League.

The tournament started on 16 July 2017 and ended on 19 May 2018. The relegation play-offs took place on 23 May and 26 May 2018. The league has scheduled to take its winter intermission after Round 19 on 9–10 December 2017 and resume its competition of the Championship with Round 20 on 17 February 2018.

The 10-time winner FC Shakhtar Donetsk were the defending champions.

The league's last season title sponsor, a bookmaker company Parimatch, withdrew from the sponsorship. On 7 July 2017, Pari-Match announced that it had ended its cooperation with the Ukrainian Premier League.

Before the start of the season a scandal arose around promotion between the First League clubs FC Desna Chernihiv and NK Veres Rivne when Veres that placed lower in tournament table was admitted to the Premier League ahead of Desna. Later it was announced that Desna might be promoted as well due to rumors around a financial situation of FC Stal Kamianske. The final decision of the league's composition was adopted at the FFU Conference on 16 June 2017.

With the ongoing War in Donbas, the Round 2 games started with a minute of silence to commemorate the soldiers of the Armed Forces of Ukraine who had perished in the ATO zone.

== Competition format ==
On 28 April 2017, the Ukrainian Premier League administration announced that its General Assembly of participants adopted decision about changes to the competition format and calendar for the next 2017–18 season. Before the assembly, the UPL Administration presented to its clubs five variants of competition format.

- For the next season UPL will keep 12 clubs (that fact was confirmed at the conference of coaches few days prior);
- Competition will have two stages, with the first stage having 22 rounds and the second stage after team will split into two six-members groups having 10 more rounds in each group;
- Team that placed the 12th will be relegated directly to Persha Liha, teams that placed 10th and 11th will play two-leg play-off with the second and third teams of the Persha Liha.

The format was confirmed by the FFU Executive Committee on 30 May 2017.

The draw for the second stage calendar was announced on 10 February and is scheduled to take place three days later on 13 February 2018.

=== Next season changes and a structural reform ===
On 26 October 2017, the magazine "Futbol" reported quoting the FFU Executive Committee member Artem Frankov that the Ukrainian Premier League at its next earliest session will review a possibility to expand the league back to 16 teams starting since the 2019–20 season. At the same time number of clubs in the Ukrainian First League will be decreased also to 16 teams.

On 8 November 2017, a conference took place involving officials of the Ukrainian Premier League as well as the Football Federation of Ukraine (FFU) where its participants were discussing a reorganization of competition system in professional and amateur football. A decision about the reform was adopted by the FFU Executive Committee on 20 June 2017.

== Teams ==
=== Promotions ===
Two teams were promoted to the league (instead of the relegated FC Dnipro and FC Volyn Lutsk):

- FC Mariupol (renamed after the previous season) – the champion of the 2016–17 Ukrainian First League (returning after two seasons absence)
- NK Veres Rivne – third place of the 2016–17 Ukrainian First League (returning for the first time since 1994–95, 22 seasons absence)

=== Location map ===
The following displays the location of teams.

Home venues of teams in the 2017–18 Ukrainian Premier League.
Teams in italics are from the conflict zone of the War in Donbas and are playing their home games in different cities.
Stal Kamianske plays its home games in Kyiv. Veres Rivne plays its home games in Lviv.
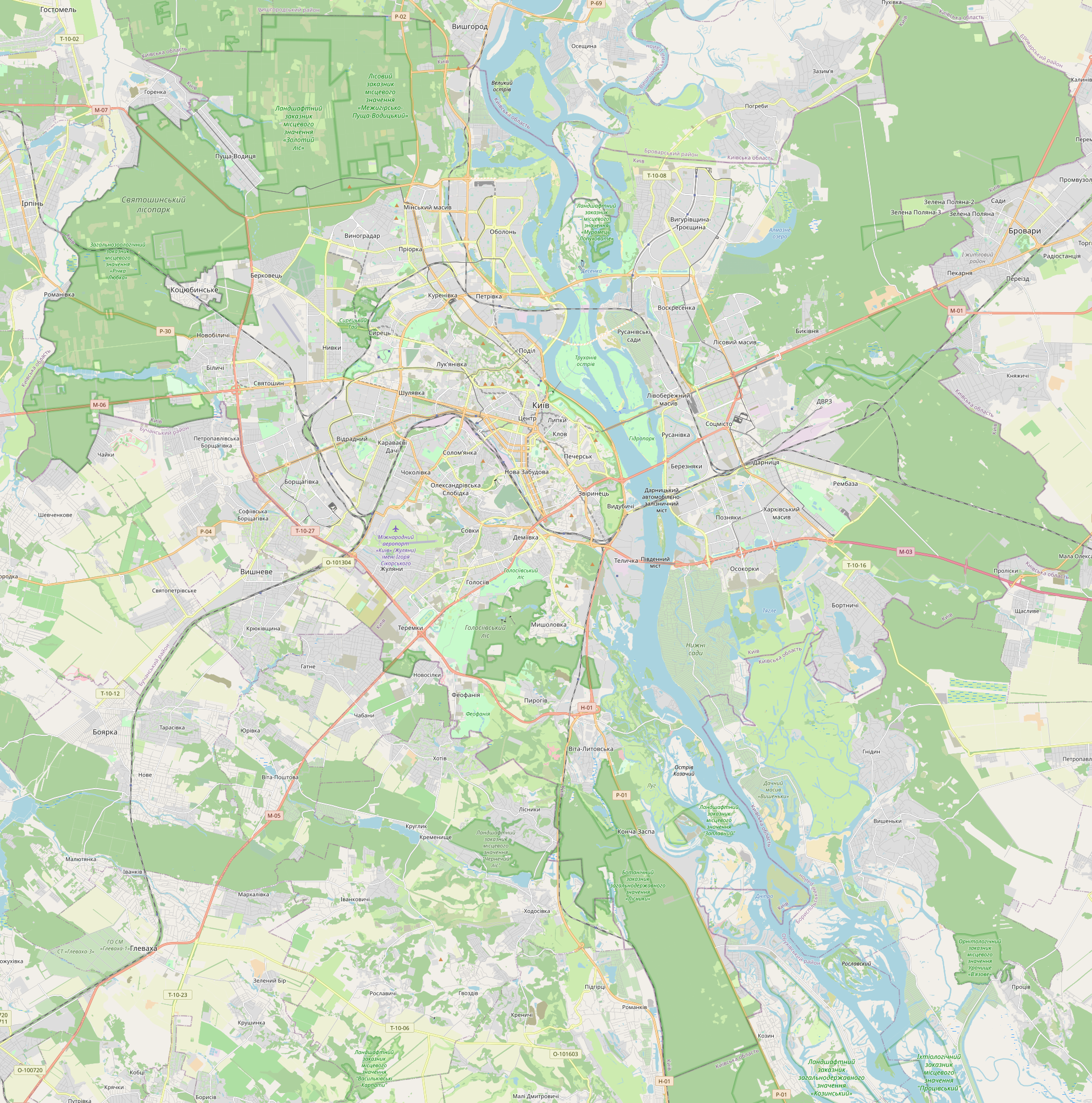
Kyiv city home venues of teams in the League
Lviv city home venues of teams in the League

=== Stadiums ===
Five teams play their matches outside of home towns. The minimum threshold for the stadium's capacity in the UPL is 5,000.

The following stadiums are regarded as home grounds:

Rank	Stadium	Place	Club	Capacity	Notes
1	NSC Olimpiyskiy	Kyiv	Dynamo Kyiv	70,050	
2	OSC Metalist	Kharkiv	Shakhtar Donetsk	40,003	Used as home ground during the season.
3	Arena Lviv	Lviv	Veres Rivne	34,915	Used as home ground during the season.
4	Chornomorets Stadium	Odesa	Chornomorets Odesa	34,164	
5	Ukraina Stadium	Lviv	Karpaty Lviv	28,051	
5	Ukraina Stadium	Lviv	NK Veres Rivne	28,051	Round 32 (last round)
6	Vorskla Stadium	Poltava	Vorskla Poltava	24,795	
7	Meteor Stadium	Dnipro	Stal Kamianske	24,381	Nominally reserved as the home station for Stal where it played only its first game.
8	Lobanovsky Dynamo Stadium (Note: The reconstruction is intended to be finished mainly by the beginning of next season, while finishing touches might be applied until August 1, 2017. The renovations are conducted in preparation to the 2017–18 UEFA Women's Champions League for which the Dynamo Stadium is chosen to be a venue of the final game.)	Kyiv	Olimpik Donetsk	16,873	Used as home ground during the season.
8	Lobanovsky Dynamo Stadium	Kyiv	Dynamo Kyiv	16,873	Dynamo used the stadium since April 2018 since NSC Olympiyskiy was getting ready to host the 2018 UEFA Champions League Final.
9	Zirka Stadium	Kropyvnytskyi	Zirka Kropyvnytskyi	13,667	
10	Illichivets Stadium (Note: Officially renamed as Volodymyr Boiko Stadium, the stadium is listed as Illichivets at the Ukrainian Premier League website)	Mariupol	FC Mariupol	12,680	
11	Slavutych-Arena	Zaporizhia	Zorya Luhansk	12,000	Used as home ground during the season.
12	CSC Nika Stadium	Oleksandriya	FC Oleksandriya	7,000	
13	Obolon Arena	Kyiv	Stal Kamianske	5,100	De facto, the home stadium of Stal.

=== Personnel and sponsorship ===
Team	President	Head coach	Captain	Kit manufacturer	Shirt sponsor
Chornomorets Odesa	Leonid Klimov	(Ukraine) Kostyantyn Frolov	(Ukraine) Serhiy Lyulka	Legea	Gefest
Dynamo Kyiv	Ihor Surkis	(Belarus) Alyaksandr Khatskevich	(Ukraine) Viktor Tsyhankov	adidas	UEFA; No to racism
Karpaty Lviv	Petro Dyminskyi	(Ukraine) Oleh Boychyshyn	(Ukraine) Artem Fedetskyi	Joma	ZIK
Mariupol	Pavlo Rozumnyi	(Ukraine) Oleksandr Babych	(Ukraine) Rustam Khudzhamov	Nike	Favorit Sport
Oleksandriya	Serhiy Kuzmenko	(Ukraine) Volodymyr Sharan	(Ukraine) Andriy Zaporozhan	Nike	UkrAhroKom
Olimpik Donetsk	Vladyslav Helzin	(Ukraine) Roman Sanzhar	(Ukraine) Zauri Makharadze	Joma	Pari-Match
Shakhtar Donetsk	Rinat Akhmetov	(Portugal) Paulo Fonseca	(Ukraine) Taras Stepanenko	Nike	SCM
Stal Kamianske	Vardan Israelian	(Bulgaria) Nikolay Kostov	(Ukraine) Maksym Zaderaka	Hummel	—
Veres Rivne	Bohdan Kopytko	(Ukraine) Andriy Demchenko (interim)	(Ukraine) Serhiy Borzenko	Joma	Global Development
Vorskla Poltava	Roman Cherniak	(Ukraine) Vasyl Sachko	(Ukraine) Volodymyr Chesnakov	adidas	Ferrexpo
Zirka Kropyvnytskyi	Maksym Berezkin	(Ukraine) Roman Monaryov	(Ukraine) Maksym Drachenko	Joma	—
Zorya Luhansk	Yevhen Heller	(Ukraine) Yuriy Vernydub	(Ukraine) Oleksandr Karavayev	Nike	Favorit Sport

Notes:

- Ever since Darijo Srna was tested positive for doping (dehydroepiandrosterone among others), on 22 September 2017 he voluntarily stopped participation in competitions and on 20 November 2017 he has been suspended by UEFA for the continental competitions. The team's captain for Shakhtar has been served either by Taras Stepanenko or Taison. On 22 February 2018, the disqualification was officially applied and retrospectively including the time he was suspended from competitions. The start time of disqualification was identified as 22 March 2017 (date of test taken) and the end time shall be no earlier than 22 August 2018.

=== Managerial changes ===
Team	Outgoing manager	Manner of departure	Date of vacancy	Table	Incoming manager	Date of appointment	Table
Dynamo Kyiv	(Ukraine) Serhii Rebrov	End of contract	31 May 2017	Pre-season	(Belarus) Alyaksandr Khatskevich	2 June 2017	Pre-season
NK Veres Rivne	(Ukraine) Yuriy Virt (caretaker)	Change of contract	6 June 2017	Pre-season	(Ukraine) Yuriy Virt	6 June 2017	Pre-season
Stal Kamianske	(Belarus) Leonid Kuchuk	End of contract	6 June 2017	Pre-season	(Armenia) Yegishe Melikyan	25 June 2017	Pre-season
Karpaty Lviv	(Belarus) Oleg Dulub	Resigned	11 June 2017	Pre-season	(Spain) Sergio Navarro	16 June 2017	Pre-season
Chornomorets Odesa	(Ukraine) Oleksandr Babych	Resigned	21 August 2017	12th	(Ukraine) Oleksandr Hranovskyi (caretaker)	21 August 2017	12th
Chornomorets Odesa	(Ukraine) Oleksandr Hranovskyi (caretaker)	End of interim spell	30 August 2017	12th	(Ukraine) Oleksiy Chystyakov (caretaker)	30 August 2017	12th
Chornomorets Odesa	(Ukraine) Oleksiy Chystyakov (caretaker)	End of interim spell	4 September 2017	12th	(Belarus) Oleg Dulub	4 September 2017	12th
Karpaty Lviv	(Spain) Sergio Navarro	Sacked	14 September 2017	10th	(Ukraine) Serhiy Zaytsev	14 September 2017	10th
FC Mariupol	(Ukraine) Oleksandr Sevidov	Mutual consent	22 September 2017	5th	(Ukraine) Oleksandr Babych	22 September 2017	5th
Stal Kamianske	(Armenia) Yegishe Melikyan	Resigned	25 September 2017	11th	(Ukraine) Kyrylo Nesterenko (caretaker)	25 September 2017	11th
Stal Kamianske	(Ukraine) Kyrylo Nesterenko (caretaker)	End of interim spell	28 September 2017	11th	(Bulgaria) Nikolay Kostov	28 September 2017	11th
Karpaty Lviv	(Ukraine) Serhiy Zaytsev	Sacked	19 November 2017	11th	(Argentina) Dario Drudi (caretaker)	19 November 2017	11th
Karpaty Lviv	(Argentina) Dario Drudi (caretaker)	Will work as assistant	21 November 2017	11th	(Ukraine) Oleh Boychyshyn	21 November 2017	11th
Chornomorets Odesa	(Belarus) Oleg Dulub	Mutual consent	22 December 2017	10th	(Ukraine) Kostyantyn Frolov	23 December 2017	10th
Veres Rivne	(Ukraine) Yuriy Virt	Mutual consent	29 December 2017	5th	(Belarus) Yury Svirkov	30 December 2017	5th
Veres Rivne	(Belarus) Yury Svirkov	Resigned	25 April 2018	6th	(Ukraine) Andriy Demchenko (caretaker)	26 April 2018	6th

== First stage ==
=== First stage table ===
Pos	Team	Pld	W	D	L	GF	GA	GD	Pts	Qualification or relegation
1	Shakhtar Donetsk	22	16	3	3	51	18	+33	51	Qualification for the Championship round
2	Dynamo Kyiv	22	13	6	3	42	20	+22	45	Qualification for the Championship round
3	Vorskla Poltava	22	11	4	7	28	22	+6	37	Qualification for the Championship round
4	Zorya Luhansk	22	8	9	5	38	28	+10	33	Qualification for the Championship round
5	Veres Rivne	22	7	11	4	26	17	+9	32	Qualification for the Championship round
6	FC Mariupol	22	9	5	8	30	27	+3	32	Qualification for the Championship round
7	Olimpik Donetsk	22	7	7	8	24	26	−2	28	Qualification for the Relegation round
8	FC Oleksandriya	22	4	11	7	19	23	−4	23	Qualification for the Relegation round
9	Zirka Kropyvnytskyi	22	4	7	11	13	31	−18	19	Qualification for the Relegation round
10	Karpaty Lviv	22	3	10	9	13	35	−22	19	Qualification for the Relegation round
11	Chornomorets Odesa	22	3	9	10	16	36	−20	18	Qualification for the Relegation round
12	Stal Kamianske	22	3	6	13	15	32	−17	15	Qualification for the Relegation round

Source: Ukrainian Premier League (in Ukrainian), UEFA, Soccerway
Rules for classification: 1) Points; 2) Goal difference; 3) Goals scored; 4) Head-to-head points; 5) Head-to-head goal difference; 6) Head-to-head goals scored; 7) Draw.

=== First stage results ===
Home \ Away	CHO	DYK	KAR	MAR	OLK	OLD	SHA	STK	VER	VOR	ZIR	ZOR
Chornomorets Odesa	—	2–1	0–0	0–0	2–2	2–1	0–0	0–1	0–1	0–3	3–3	1–1
Dynamo Kyiv	2–1	—	5–0	5–1	3–0	1–0	0–0	4–1	0–0	2–1	3–0	3–2
Karpaty Lviv	1–1	1–1	—	0–1	0–0	2–1 (Note: The game stopped after the first half (1:1) due to heavy snowfall. On 3 December 2017, the UPL Administration announced that the game will not be postponed to the next day on 4 December 2017 and a decision on its outcome will be adopted additionally. On 6 December 2017, the League's administration announced that it will pass to the FFU Control and Disciplinary Committee for review all its materials related to the game. Among many issues related to Karpaty, on 21 December 2017 the FFU CDC adopted a decision for a game between Karpaty and Olimpik to finish after the winter break. The game was played on 21 February 2018.)	0–3	3–1	1–6	1–3	1–1	0–2
Mariupol	3–0	3–0 (Note: see 2017–18 Ukrainian Premier League#Mariupol vs Dynamo (security issues))	3–0	—	1–1	1–0	1–3	4–2	0–0	0–1	1–0	2–5
FC Oleksandriya	0–0	0–0	3–0	1–0	—	0–2	1–2	4–1	1–1	0–1	0–0	1–1
Olimpik Donetsk	1–0	1–2	0–0	3–2	1–0	—	2–4	2–0	0–0	1–4	1–0	3–3
Shakhtar Donetsk	5–0	0–1	2–0	3–1	1–2	2–0	—	1–1	2–0	3–2	5–0	3–1
Stal Kamianske	1–1	0–2	0–0	0–1	2–0	1–1	1–2	—	0–1	0–1	0–1	0–1
Veres Rivne	3–1	3–1	2–2	1–1	0–0	1–1	1–2	1–1	—	1–0	0–0	0–1
Vorskla Poltava	2–1	0–0	0–1	1–0	3–1	1–1	0–3	1–1	1–0	—	2–1	1–1
Zirka Kropyvnytskyi	0–1	0–2	0–0	0–3	0–0 (Note: The game between Zirka Kropyvnytskyi and Oleksandriya was postponed three days due to the pitch conditions after recent snowstorm.)	0–0	2–4	1–0	1–3	1–0	—	2–1
Zorya Luhansk	5–0	4–4	0–0	1–1	2–2	0–2	2–1	0–1	1–1	3–0	1–0	—

Source: Ukrainian Premier League (in Ukrainian)
Legend: Blue = home team win; Yellow = draw; Red = away team win.
For upcoming matches, an "a" indicates there is an article about the rivalry between the two participants.

=== First stage positions by round ===
The following table represents the teams position after each round in the competition played chronologically.

Team ╲ Round	1	2	3	4	5	6	7	8	9	10	11	12	13	14	15	16	17	18	19	20	21	22
Shakhtar Donetsk	1	4	2	2	2	2	1	1	2	1	1	1	1	1	1	1	1	1	1	1	1	1
Dynamo Kyiv	3	1	1	1	1	1	2	2	1	2	2	2	2	2	2	2	2	2	2	2	2	2
Vorskla Poltava	12	5	4	4	4	3	3	3	3	3	3	3	4	4	5	5	5	3	3	3	3	3
Zorya Luhansk	10	9	9	11	8	8	7	7	7	7	7	7	6	6	6	6	6	6	4	4	4	4
Veres Rivne	7	8	7	5	6	5	5	5	4	4	4	5	5	5	4	4	3	4	5	5	5	5
FC Mariupol	8	7	5	7	5	6	6	6	5	5	6	6	7	7	7	7	7	7	7	6	7	6
Olimpik Donetsk	2	3	6	3	3	4	4	4	6	6	5	4	3	3	3	3	4	5	6	7	6	7
FC Oleksandriya	11	11	10	9	10	11	11	11	9	8	8	9	9	10	10	8	8	8	8	8	8	8
Zirka Kropyvnytskyi	5	6	8	10	11	9	8	8	8	9	9	8	10	9	8	10	10	9	9	9	10	9
Karpaty Lviv	6	10	11	8	9	10	10	10	10	10	11	11	8	8	9	11	11	11	11	10	9	10
Chornomorets Odesa	9	12	12	12	12	12	12	12	12	12	12	10	11	11	11	9	9	10	10	11	11	11
Stal Kamianske	4	2	3	6	7	7	9	9	11	11	10	12	12	12	12	12	12	12	12	12	12	12

Notes:
- After the second round, places of Zirka Kropyvnytskyi (6th) and FC Mariupol (7th) are defined by undisclosed criterion.
- After the third round, places of Zirka Kropyvnytskyi (8th) and Zorya Luhansk (9th) are defined by undisclosed criterion.

== Championship round ==
=== Championship round table ===
Pos	Team	Pld	W	D	L	GF	GA	GD	Pts	Qualification or relegation
1	Shakhtar Donetsk (C)	32	24	3	5	71	24	+47	75	Qualification for the Champions League group stage
2	Dynamo Kyiv	32	22	7	3	64	25	+39	73	Qualification for the Champions League third qualifying round
3	Vorskla Poltava	32	14	7	11	37	35	+2	49	Qualification for the Europa League group stage (Note: Since the winners of the 2017–18 Ukrainian Cup, Shakhtar Donetsk, qualified for European competition based on league position, the spot awarded to the cup winners (Europa League group stage) was passed to the third-placed team, the spot awarded to the third-placed team (Europa League third qualifying round) was passed to the fourth-placed team, and the spot awarded to the fourth-placed team (Europa League second qualifying round) was passed to the fifth-placed team.)
4	Zorya Luhansk	32	11	10	11	44	44	0	43	Qualification for the Europa League third qualifying round
5	FC Mariupol	32	10	9	13	38	41	−3	39	Qualification for the Europa League second qualifying round
6	Veres Rivne (D)	32	7	14	11	28	30	−2	35	Club suspended after the season

Source: Ukrainian Premier League (in Ukrainian), UEFA, Soccerway
Rules for classification: 1) Points; 2) Goal difference; 3) Goals scored; 4) Head-to-head points; 5) Head-to-head goal difference; 6) Head-to-head goals scored; 7) Draw.
(C) Champions; (D) Disqualified

=== Championship round results ===
Home \ Away	DYK	MAR	SHA	VER	VOR	ZOR
Dynamo Kyiv	—	1–1	2–1	1–0	4–0	4–0
Mariupol	2–3	—	0–1	2–0	1–1	0–0
Shakhtar Donetsk	0–1	3–0	—	1–0	4–2	2–1
Veres Rivne	1–4	1–1	0–2	—	0–0	0–1
Vorskla Poltava	0–1	1–0	0–3	0–0	—	2–0
Zorya Luhansk	0–1	3–1	0–3	1–0	0–3	—

Source: Ukrainian Premier League (in Ukrainian)
Legend: Blue = home team win; Yellow = draw; Red = away team win.
For upcoming matches, an "a" indicates there is an article about the rivalry between the two participants.

=== Championship round positions by round ===
Team ╲ Round	23	24	25	26	27	28	29	30	31	32
Shakhtar Donetsk	1	1	1	1	1	1	1	1	1	1
Dynamo Kyiv	2	2	2	2	2	2	2	2	2	2
Vorskla Poltava	3	4	3	3	3	3	3	3	3	3
Zorya Luhansk	4	3	4	4	4	4	4	4	4	4
FC Mariupol	5	5	6	6	5	5	5	5	5	5
Veres Rivne	6	6	5	5	6	6	6	6	6	6

== Relegation round ==
=== Relegation round table ===
Pos	Team	Pld	W	D	L	GF	GA	GD	Pts	Qualification or relegation
7	FC Oleksandriya	32	10	15	7	32	27	+5	45	
8	Karpaty Lviv	32	8	13	11	28	45	−17	37	
9	Olimpik Donetsk	32	9	9	14	29	38	−9	36	
10	Zirka Kropyvnytskyi (R)	32	7	10	15	22	40	−18	31	Qualification for the Relegation play-offs
11	Chornomorets Odesa (Z)	32	6	11	15	26	49	−23	29	Qualification for the Relegation play-offs
12	Stal Kamianske (R, X)	32	6	8	18	23	44	−21	26	Relegated and later withdrawn

Source: Ukrainian Premier League (in Ukrainian), UEFA, Soccerway
Rules for classification: 1) Points; 2) Goal difference; 3) Goals scored; 4) Head-to-head points; 5) Head-to-head goal difference; 6) Head-to-head goals scored; 7) Draw.
(R) Relegated; (X) Withdrew; (Z) Readmitted in after withdrawal of FC Poltava. see 2017–18 Ukrainian Premier League #Relegation play-offs for more information.

=== Relegation round results ===
Home \ Away	CHO	KAR	OLK	OLD	STK	ZIR
Chornomorets Odesa	—	1–1	1–3	3–1	0–1	1–0
Karpaty Lviv	3–1	—	1–2	0–3	3–0	2–1
FC Oleksandriya	0–0	1–1	—	2–0	2–0	1–0
Olimpik Donetsk	1–0	0–2	0–0	—	0–2	0–1
Stal Kamianske	1–2	0–1	1–2	0–0	—	1–1
Zirka Kropyvnytskyi	2–1	1–1	0–0	2–0	1–2	—

Source: Ukrainian Premier League (in Ukrainian)
Legend: Blue = home team win; Yellow = draw; Red = away team win.
For upcoming matches, an "a" indicates there is an article about the rivalry between the two participants.

=== Relegation round positions by round ===
Team ╲ Round	23	24	25	26	27	28	29	30	31	32
FC Oleksandriya	8	8	8	8	8	7	7	7	7	7
Karpaty Lviv	11	11	10	9	9	9	9	9	9	8
Olimpik Donetsk	7	7	7	7	7	8	8	8	8	9
Zirka Kropyvnytskyi	9	9	9	10	10	10	10	10	10	10
Chornomorets Odesa	10	12	12	12	12	12	11	12	12	11
Stal Kamianske	12	10	11	11	11	11	12	11	11	12

== Relegation play-offs ==
Teams that placed 10th and 11th in the 2017–18 Ukrainian Premier League play two-leg play-off with the second and third teams of the 2017–18 Ukrainian First League. On 11 May 2018, a draw for relegation play-offs took place in the House of Football, Kyiv. The games were played on 23 May and 27 May 2018.

Team 1	Agg.	Team 2	1st leg	2nd leg
Zirka Kropyvnytskyi	1–5	Desna Chernihiv	1–1	0–4
Chornomorets Odesa	1–3	FC Poltava	1–0	0–3 (a.e.t.)

=== First leg ===
23 May 2018
17:00 UTC+3

Zirka Kropyvnytskyi	1–1	Desna Chernihiv
D. Favorov 77' (o.g.)	Report	Volkov 32'

Zirka Stadium, Kropyvnytskyi
Attendance: 2,981
Referee: Serhiy Boyko (Kyiv Oblast)

23 May 2018
19:00 UTC+3

Chornomorets Odesa	1–0	FC Poltava
Kovalets 36'	Report

Chornomorets Stadium, Odesa
Attendance: 4,124
Referee: Yevhen Aranovskyi (Kyiv)

=== Second leg ===
27 May 2018
17:00 UTC+3

FC Poltava	3–0 (a.e.t.)	Chornomorets Odesa
Dehtyarev 67', 105'; Zubeiko 113' (o.g.)	Report	Romanyuk (yellow card) 64' (yellow-red card) 110'

Lokomotyv Stadium, Poltava
Attendance: 3,700
Referee: Yuriy Mozharovskyi (Lviv)

FC Poltava won 3–1 on aggregate and was promoted to the 2018–19 Ukrainian Premier League. Chornomorets Odesa was relegated to the 2018–19 Ukrainian First League. But later, the league picked Chornomorets Odesa for the FC Poltava's replacement for the next season after their withdrawal.

27 May 2018
18:00 UTC+3

Desna Chernihiv	4–0	Zirka Kropyvnytskyi
A.Favorov (penalty missed) 24'; D.Favorov 38'; Arveladze 52', 87'; Volkov 63'	Report

Chernihiv Stadium, Chernihiv
Attendance: 10,799
Referee: Kostiantyn Trukhanov (Kharkiv)

Desna Chernihiv won 5–1 on aggregate and was promoted to the 2018–19 Ukrainian Premier League. Zirka Kropyvnytskyi was relegated to the 2018–19 Ukrainian First League.

== Season statistics ==
=== Top goalscorers ===
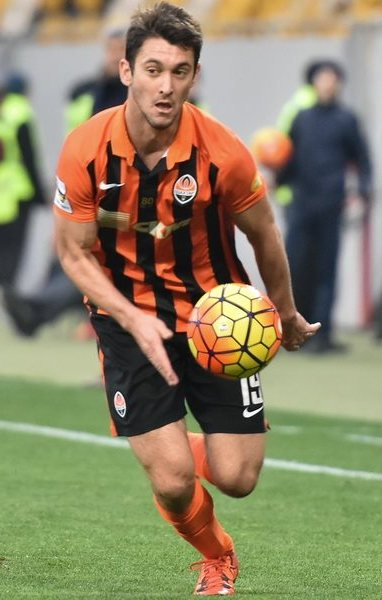
UPL top scorer Facundo Ferreyra

As of 19 May 2018

Rank	Scorer	Team	Goals (Pen.)
1	(Argentina) Facundo Ferreyra	Shakhtar Donetsk	21 (1)
2	(Ukraine) Marlos	Shakhtar Donetsk	18 (5)
3	(Ukraine) Viktor Tsyhankov	Dynamo Kyiv	13 (2)
4	(Brazil) Iury	Zorya Luhansk	11 (1)
5	(Ukraine) Yuriy Kolomoyets	Vorskla Poltava	9
5	(Democratic Republic of the Congo) Dieumerci Mbokani	Dynamo Kyiv	9
5	(Ukraine) Mykhaylo Serhiychuk	Veres / Vorskla	9 (3)
8	(Ukraine) Oleksiy Khoblenko	Chornomorets Odesa	8 (1)
8	(Ukraine) Orest Kuzyk	Stal Kamianske	8 (1)
10	(Ukraine) Artem Hromov	Zorya Luhansk	7
10	(Ukraine) Serhiy Starenkyi	FC Oleksandriya	7
10	(Ukraine) Marian Shved	Karpaty Lviv	7

=== Hat-tricks ===
Player	For	Against	Result	Date
(Ukraine) Viktor Tsyhankov	Dynamo Kyiv	Karpaty Lviv	5–0	29 July 2017
(Ukraine) Serhiy Starenkyi	Oleksandriya	Stal Kamanske	4–1	16 September 2017
(Ukraine) Oleksandr Andriyevskyi	Zorya Luhansk	Mariupol	5–2	22 October 2017
(Ukraine) Andriy Boryachuk	Mariupol	Zirka Kropyvnytskyi	3–0	18 February 2018

^{(number)} Player scored (number) goals if more than 3

Away win
Home win
Draw

== Awards ==
=== Monthly awards ===
Month	Player of the Month		
Month	Player	Club	Reference
July 2017	(Brazil) Marlos	Shakhtar Donetsk	
August 2017	(Ukraine) Maksym Pryadun	Zirka Kropyvnytskyi	
September 2017	(Belarus) Alyaksandr Hutar	Chornomorets Odesa	
October 2017	(Ukraine) Oleksandr Andriyevskyi	Zorya Luhansk	
November 2017	(Ukraine) Artem Polyarus	FC Oleksandriya	
March 2018	(Ukraine) Viktor Tsyhankov	Dynamo Kyiv	
April 2018	(Colombia) Jorge Carrascal	Karpaty Lviv	
May 2018	(Slovenia) Benjamin Verbič	Dynamo Kyiv	

=== Round awards ===
Round	Player			Coach		
Round	Player	Club	Reference	Coach	Club	Reference
Round 1	(Brazil) Marlos	Shakhtar Donetsk		(Armenia) Yegishe Melikyan	Stal Kamianske	
Round 2	(Democratic Republic of the Congo) Dieumerci Mbokani	Dynamo Kyiv		(Belarus) Alyaksandr Khatskevich	Dynamo Kyiv	
Round 3	(Ukraine) Viktor Tsyhankov	Dynamo Kyiv		(Ukraine) Oleksandr Sevidov	FC Mariupol	
Round 4	(Ukraine) Oleksandr Tkachenko	Vorskla Poltava		(Ukraine) Yuriy Virt	Veres Rivne	
Round 5	(Ukraine) Vyacheslav Churko	FC Mariupol		(Ukraine) Roman Sanzhar	Olimpik Donetsk	
Round 6	(Ukraine) Oleksandr Chyzhov	Vorskla Poltava		(Ukraine) Roman Monaryov	Zirka Kropyvnytskyi	
Round 7	(Ukraine) Maksym Pryadun	Zirka Kropyvnytskyi		(Ukraine) Yuriy Vernydub	Zorya Luhansk	
Round 8	(Ukraine) Viktor Tsyhankov	Dynamo Kyiv		(Ukraine) Yuriy Virt	Veres Rivne	
Round 9	(Belarus) Alyaksandr Hutar	Chornomorets Odesa		(Belarus) Alyaksandr Khatskevich	Dynamo Kyiv	
Round 10	(Ukraine) Oleksandr Bandura	Veres Rivne		(Ukraine) Yuriy Virt	Veres Rivne	
Round 11	(Ukraine) Ihor Kharatin	Zorya Luhansk		(Ukraine) Vasyl Sachko	Vorskla Poltava	
Round 12	(Ukraine) Yuriy Kolomoyets	Vorskla Poltava		(Belarus) Oleg Dulub	Chornomorets Odesa	
Round 13	(Ukraine) Oleksandr Andriyevskyi	Zorya Luhansk		(Ukraine) Yuriy Vernydub	Zorya Luhansk	
Round 14	(Ukraine) Serhiy Myakushko	Karpaty Lviv		(Bulgaria) Nikolay Kostov	Stal Kamianske	
Round 15	(Ukraine) Vitaliy Buyalskyi	Dynamo Kyiv		(Belarus) Alyaksandr Khatskevich	Dynamo Kyiv	
Round 16	(Ukraine) Artem Polyarus	FC Oleksandriya		(Ukraine) Volodymyr Sharan	FC Oleksandriya	
Round 17	(Ukraine) Marlos	Shakhtar Donetsk		(Ukraine) Volodymyr Sharan	FC Oleksandriya	
Round 18	(Ukraine) Viktor Tsyhankov	Dynamo Kyiv		Not awarded		
Round 19	(Ukraine) Yuriy Pankiv	FC Oleksandriya		(Ukraine) Vasyl Sachko	Vorskla Poltava	
winter break
Round 20	(Ukraine) Andriy Boryachuk	FC Mariupol		(Bulgaria) Nikolay Kostov	Stal Kamianske	
Round 21	(Ukraine) Marlos	Shakhtar Donetsk		(Ukraine) Yuriy Vernydub	Zorya Luhansk	
Round 22	(Ukraine) Viktor Tsyhankov	Dynamo Kyiv		(Ukraine) Oleksandr Babych	FC Mariupol	
Round 23	(Argentina) Facundo Ferreyra	Shakhtar Donetsk		(Portugal) Paulo Fonseca	Shakhtar Donetsk	
Round 24	(Ukraine) Viktor Tsyhankov	Dynamo Kyiv		(Ukraine) Yuriy Vernydub	Zorya Luhansk	
Round 25	(Ukraine) Mykola Shaparenko	Dynamo Kyiv		(Portugal) Paulo Fonseca	Shakhtar Donetsk	
Round 26	(Ukraine) Viktor Tsyhankov	Dynamo Kyiv		(Belarus) Alyaksandr Khatskevich	Dynamo Kyiv	
Round 27	(Ukraine) Volodymyr Shepelyev	Dynamo Kyiv		(Belarus) Alyaksandr Khatskevich	Dynamo Kyiv	
Round 28	(Ukraine) Artem Besyedin	Dynamo Kyiv		(Portugal) Paulo Fonseca	Shakhtar Donetsk	
Round 29	(Brazil) Iury	Zorya Luhansk		(Ukraine) Kostiantyn Frolov	Chornomorets Odesa	
Round 30	(Brazil) Taison	Shakhtar Donetsk		(Ukraine) Oleksandr Babych	FC Mariupol	
Round 31	(Ukraine) Oleksandr Bandura	Veres Rivne		(Belarus) Alyaksandr Khatskevich	Dynamo Kyiv	
Round 32	(Ukraine) Vladyslav Kulach	Vorskla Poltava		(Ukraine) Vasyl Sachko	Vorskla Poltava	

=== The 2017 Coach of the Year award ===
The best coaches were identified by the All-Ukrainian Football Coaches Association.

Place	Coach	Team	Mark
1	(Ukraine) Roman Sanzhar	Olimpik Donetsk	4.18
2	(Portugal) Paulo Fonseca	Shakhtar Donetsk	4.16
3	(Ukraine) Yuriy Vernydub	Zorya Luhansk	4.02
4	(Ukraine) Volodymyr Sharan	FC Oleksandriya	3.88
5	(Belarus) Alyaksandr Khatskevich	Dynamo Kyiv	3.60

=== Season awards ===
The laureates of the 2017–18 UPL season were:

- Best player: (Ukraine) Marlos (Shakhtar Donetsk)
- Best coach: (Belarus) Alyaksandr Khatskevich (Dynamo Kyiv)
- Best goalkeeper: (Ukraine) Andriy Pyatov (Shakhtar Donetsk)
- Best arbiter: (Ukraine) Yuriy Mozharovskyi (Lviv)
- Best young player: (Ukraine) Viktor Tsyhankov (Dynamo Kyiv)
- Best goalscorer: (Argentina) Facundo Ferreyra (Shakhtar Donetsk)

== Season's incidents ==
=== Desna vs Veres promotion ===
On 1 June 2017, it was announced that second-placed club FC Desna Chernihiv was denied a license to play in the top division. The argument was that the club was not able to provide guarantees for an adequate financing of infrastructure. The license was received by NK Veres Rivne, the third-placed team during the last season in the second-tier division.

Both clubs FC Desna Chernihiv and NK Veres Rivne did not play at their home stadiums in the 2016–17 Ukrainian First League. The first one played in Kyiv at the Obolon Arena, while the other one played in Varash, at the Izotop Stadium of the Rivne Nuclear Power Plant. The administration of Desna released a letter of protest before a meeting of FFU representatives. In protest, the Desna administration announced that the club would not play its final game of the season against FC Illichivets Mariupol, but later relented. Nonetheless, during the game, players of both teams expressed their protest on the field in a special way: when the whistle was blown the players, instead of starting play, were demonstratively standing around yet kicking a ball.

On 2 June 2017, upon conclusion of its conference the UPL administration announced about the final composition of the league and calendar for the upcoming season. The conference confirmed the admission of Veres to the league and the only club that voted against was FC Dynamo Kyiv, while six votes were for decision and three (including FC Zorya Luhansk) abstained. On 2 June 2017, the Desna fans were picketing the House of Football in Kyiv after they arrived on four buses from Chernihiv.

On 7 June 2017, sports media UA-Football requested from Football Federation of Ukraine and FC Desna Chernihiv to publish related documents to have better understanding over the situation and come to some kind of closure on the subject.

Number of football experts negatively commented on the situation, while the PFC Sumy head coach Anatoliy Bezsmertnyi stated that tomorrow these sports functionaries in such way will make Veres the national champions. The former PFL president Svyatoslav Syrota said that the FFU vice-president is lying about Desna problems. President of FC Inhulets Petrove, Oleksandr Porovoznyuk, called on other clubs to withdraw their teams from the league in support for FC Desna Chernihiv. President of FC Hirnyk-Sport Horishni Plavni Petro Kaplun stated that it makes him laugh when the president of Veres Oleksiy Khakhlev asks to follow the regulations. He points out that last season Veres was admitted to the Second League with complete disregard to the season's regulations. Kaplun also called on the FFU authorities to pay attention to what owners of professional clubs have to say as they have a right to express their vote of confidence for the FFU leadership.

=== Mariupol vs Dynamo (security issues) ===
Another issue relating to the Russian military intervention in Ukraine became serious when FC Dynamo Kyiv failed to arrive to Mariupol for the away game against FC Mariupol on 27 August 2017.

The issue was ongoing ever since the end of previous season when on 2 June 2017 FC Mariupol's promotion to the Ukrainian Premier League became official. On 3 June 2017 the vice president of Dynamo Serhiy Mokhnyk officially announced that the club will not travel for a game in Mariupol city as it is difficult to present guarantees in security due the fact that the city is located near a frontline (about 23–25 km (14–16 mi), see War in Donbas). The vice president also offered to conduct the game on a neutral field such as Dnipro Arena. Few days later in more details the same announcement was repeated by Ihor Surkis who also added that if he will receive documented security guarantees, he will send his team to Mariupol.

The leadership of the Football Federation of Ukraine (FFU) in a face of Andriy Pavelko right away expressed its opposition for the Dynamo's statement. The president of FFU made an emphasis that the game in Mariupol is an important component of uniting policy on national scale. He also underlined that there is no danger in conducting the game in Mariupol.

During preparation for the next season the issue was moved to background. However, when the season started on 16 July 2017, the issue surfaced again. About a week later, on 24 July 2017, Dynamo received recommendation letter from the Ministry of Interior and the Security Service of Ukraine where it was urged not to travel to Mariupol for a game. The same day Dynamo published its own letter addressed to the Football Federation of Ukraine and Ukrainian Premier League petitioning to transfer the Round 7 game against Mariupol scheduled on 27 August 2017 to another city. Two days later, on 26 July 2017, almost at the same time both the Minister of Interior (Arsen Avakov) and the President of UPL (Volodymyr Heninson) made public announcements assuring in safety of conducting football games in the littoral city of the Sea of Azov.

Throughout the rest of month of July two games took place in Mariupol. Until August FC Karpaty Lviv supported the position of Dynamo. Eventually to this "stand off" became involved the general manager of FC Shakhtar Donetsk Serhiy Palkin, while the television channel "Football" launched a wide informational campaign in support to conduct the game. For example, during one of the channel's broadcasting the president of Football Federation of Mariupol city called Hryhoriy Surkis the "main football separatist" and offered him to resolve the issue through Viktor Medvedchuk and the president of the aggressor state (Vladimir Putin). On 11 August 2017, the Deputy director of National Police in Donetsk Oblast wrote an official letter to the Football Federation of Ukraine with security guarantees for all games in Mariupol. Finally the game between FC Mariupol and FC Karpaty took place on August 13 in Mariupol.

On 18 August 2017, FFU issued a press release where it denied the petition of Dynamo in transferring the game. The session of the FFU Executive Committee that had taken place on 22 August 2017 should have solved the problem.

Following no show of Dynamo to the game with FC Mariupol on 27 August 2017, FC Mariupol issued a press release where it accused its opponents in attempt to discredit the football club from Mariupol. On 14 November 2017, The Appeal Committee of the Football Federation of Ukraine did not satisfy the Dynamo appeal and counted the team's technical defeat.

On 19 February 2018, the Court of Arbitration for Sport in Lausanne declined all claims of Dynamo to the Football Federation of Ukraine in relations to the "Mariupol case".

On 28 February 2018, the Ukrainian Premier League has officially updated its standings in correspondence to the earlier decision of the FFU CDC of 11 September 2017.

=== Relocation of teams ===
Due to the 2014 Russian invasion of Ukraine some football clubs were forced to be dissolved, other moved away to other cities in Ukraine. Among the UPL teams, teams from Donetsk, Olimpik and Shakhtar, moved to Kyiv, Zorya Luhansk moved to Zaporizhia, teams from the Autonomous Republic of Crimea, Tavriya and Sevastopol, were dissolved. The relocated teams did not hurry with their change of place of registry in hope to be able to return home in near future.

In 2018 Shakhtar has officially changed its place of registry from Donetsk to Mariupol.

During the season several clubs (Shakhtar, Stal, and Veres) changed their city registration for various reasons and informed the Football Federation of Ukraine that since the next season will represent other cities.

=== 2018 UPL presidential elections ===
The 2018 presidential elections of the Ukrainian Premier League took place on 6 April 2018. The current president Volodymyr Heninson that serves as the president since February 2016 announced that he will not run for president in 2018. Among possible candidates specialists note a Swiss lawyer Thomas Grimm or Joe Palmer from AFC Wimbledon. As of 26 March 2018, a day before deadline for submitting candidacy for election, there is only Thomas Grimm whose candidacy was submitted by FC Oleksandriya on 22 March 2018. On 6 April 2018, Thomas Grimm was elected as a new president with 10 votes for and 2 abstained.

=== Prospective disciplinary sanctions ===
According to FootballHub, in March the FFU Disciplinary Committee prosecuted the Olimpik's junior teams U-19 and U-21 for game fixing. Earlier the CDC chairman, Francesco Baranca, underlined that Olimpik won't participate in European competitions if its junior teams will be disqualified.

FC Vorskla Poltava could have problems with the league's attestation for next season for debts to its former players. Another UPL player submitted his claim to the FFU CDC against its former club FC Stal Kamianske.

== See also ==
- 2017–18 Ukrainian First League
- 2017–18 Ukrainian Second League
- 2017–18 Ukrainian Cup
- List of Ukrainian football transfers summer 2017
- List of Ukrainian football transfers winter 2017–18

== Notes ==
1. On 29 September 2017, it was announced that Marlos (native of Brazil) officially received Ukrainian citizenship and awaits for the FIFA documents permitting him to play for the Ukraine national football team. On 30 September 2017, FFU announced that Marlos is called up to play for the Ukraine national football team in the upcoming games of the 2018 FIFA World Cup qualification against Kosovo and Croatia.
2. On 12 January 2018, Khoblenko signed with Lech Poznan.
3. On 5 March 2018, Serhiychuk signed with FC Vorskla Poltava.
