= 2016–17 Ukrainian Premier League =

26th season of top-tier football league in Vyshcha Liha

Ukrainian Premier League
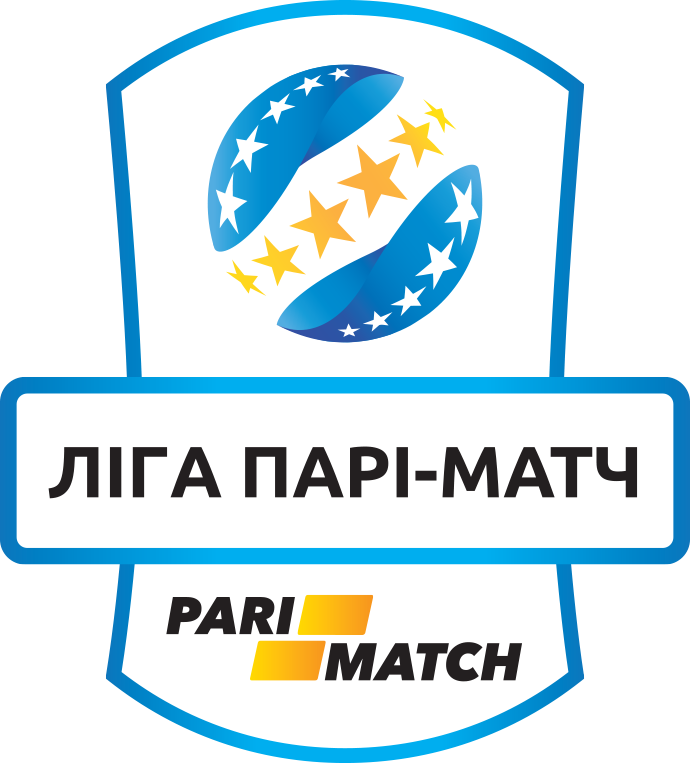
- Title sponsor logo
- Season: 2016–17
- Champions: Shakhtar Donetsk; 10th title
- Champions League: Shakhtar Donetsk; Dynamo Kyiv
- Europa League: Zorya Luhansk; Olimpik Donetsk; Oleksandriya
- Matches: 186
- Goals: 437 (2.35 per match)
- Top goalscorer: 15 – Andriy Yarmolenko (Dynamo)
- Biggest home win: 6 – Oleksandriya 6–0 Volyn (Round 19); Dynamo 6–0 Oleksandriya (Round 28)
- Biggest away win: 4 – Olimpik 0–4 Dynamo (Round 9); Olimpik 0–4 Shakhtar (Round 25)
- Highest scoring: 7 – Dynamo 3–4 Shakhtar (Round 18)
- Longest winning run: 10 – Shakhtar (Round 12–21)
- Longest unbeaten run: 23 – Shakhtar (Round 1–23)
- Longest winless run: 12 – Karpaty (Round 2–13); Volyn (Round 13–24)
- Longest losing run: 7 – Volyn (Round 18–24)
- Highest attendance: 51,732 – Dynamo–Shakhtar (Round 26)
- Lowest attendance: 0 – three games (Note: FC Volyn Lutsk was penalized by the Football Federation of Ukraine for its fans and two of its home games were played behind the "closed doors" (without stadium spectators). FC Dnipro was penalized by the Football Federation of Ukraine for its fans and home game against Chornomorets was played behind the "closed doors" (without stadium spectators).)
- All statistics correct as of 24 April 2017.

The 2016–17 Ukrainian Premier League season was the 26th top-level football club competitions since the fall of the Soviet Union and the ninth since the establishment of the Ukrainian Premier League. The league played its first 18 rounds before the winter break (10 December 2016 – 25 February 2017) finishing its first stage of tournament in March. The second stage started on 1 April 2017 and finished on 31 May 2017.

The league's title sponsor for 2016–17 season as for the previous season is a bookmaker company Parimatch, the title of which is displayed on the season shield.

With the continuation of the military conflict in the eastern oblasts (regions) of Ukraine since 2014 and the Russian occupation of Crimea (see the map), the league was forced to change its format again and will now be contested by 12 teams after being cut from 14 in the 2015–16 season.

Dynamo Kyiv were the two-time defending champions. On 6 May 2017 in Kharkiv, Shakhtar Donetsk secured its 10th championship title with a win over Zorya Luhansk and four more rounds to play in the season. The 10th title that Shakhtar earned this season would allow the club to place a star on the club's crest to indicate this feat.

== Changes and announcements ==
On 29 February 2016, the Ukrainian Premier League administration announced that there will be changes to the competition format for the 2016–17 season. It was confirmed that the championship would be played in two different phases, the first phase will be using a standard double round-robin tournament system and the second phase will be broken into two groups one from 1st to 6th place which will play for the championship and the European spots and the second group made up of teams from 7th place to 12th which will play to avoid relegation. The bottom two teams will be relegated and would be replaced by the champion and the runner-up of the 2016–17 Ukrainian First League. The points gained in the first stage are passed on to the second stage.

The new format was to be presented by the FFU Executive Committee. On 29 April 2016, the FFU Executive Committee approved the changes to the new UPL format for 2016–17 season. The fixtures were announced on 7 June 2016. The competition commenced on 21 July when Shakhtar Donetsk hosted Zirka Kropyvnytskyi in Lviv. The first eighteen rounds will be played before winter break which will begin after 10 December 2016. The competition is to resume 25 February 2017. The first phase will end on 18 March 2017 after which the league will split according to the first phase final standings with the second phase starting on 1 April 2017. The season will be concluded on 31 May 2017.

On 7 March 2017, the official website of Dynamo announced that the draw for the second stage of 2016–17 Ukrainian Premier League on 10 March 2017 at the VIP-lounge of Olympiyskyi NSC at 12:00 LST. On 10 March 2017 at Olimpiyskyi NSC took place a draw for the second stage of the tournament.

== Teams ==
=== Promoted teams ===
- Zirka Kropyvnytskyi – the champion of the 2015–16 Ukrainian First League (returning for the first time since 2003–04 season, 13 seasons absence).

=== Renamed teams ===
As part of ongoing decommunization in Ukraine, several populated places in Ukraine changed their names, therefore the league adopted the same changes and applied them to the respective clubs in parentheses.

- FC Dnipro is shown as out of Dnipro.
- FC Stal Kamianske is shown as out of Kamianske.
- FC Zirka Kropyvnytskyi is shown as out of Kropyvnytskyi.

=== Location map ===
Home venues of teams in the 2016–17 Ukrainian Premier League.
Teams in italics are from a conflict zone of the war in Donbas and are playing their home games in different cities.
Stal Kamianske plays its home games also in Dnipro.
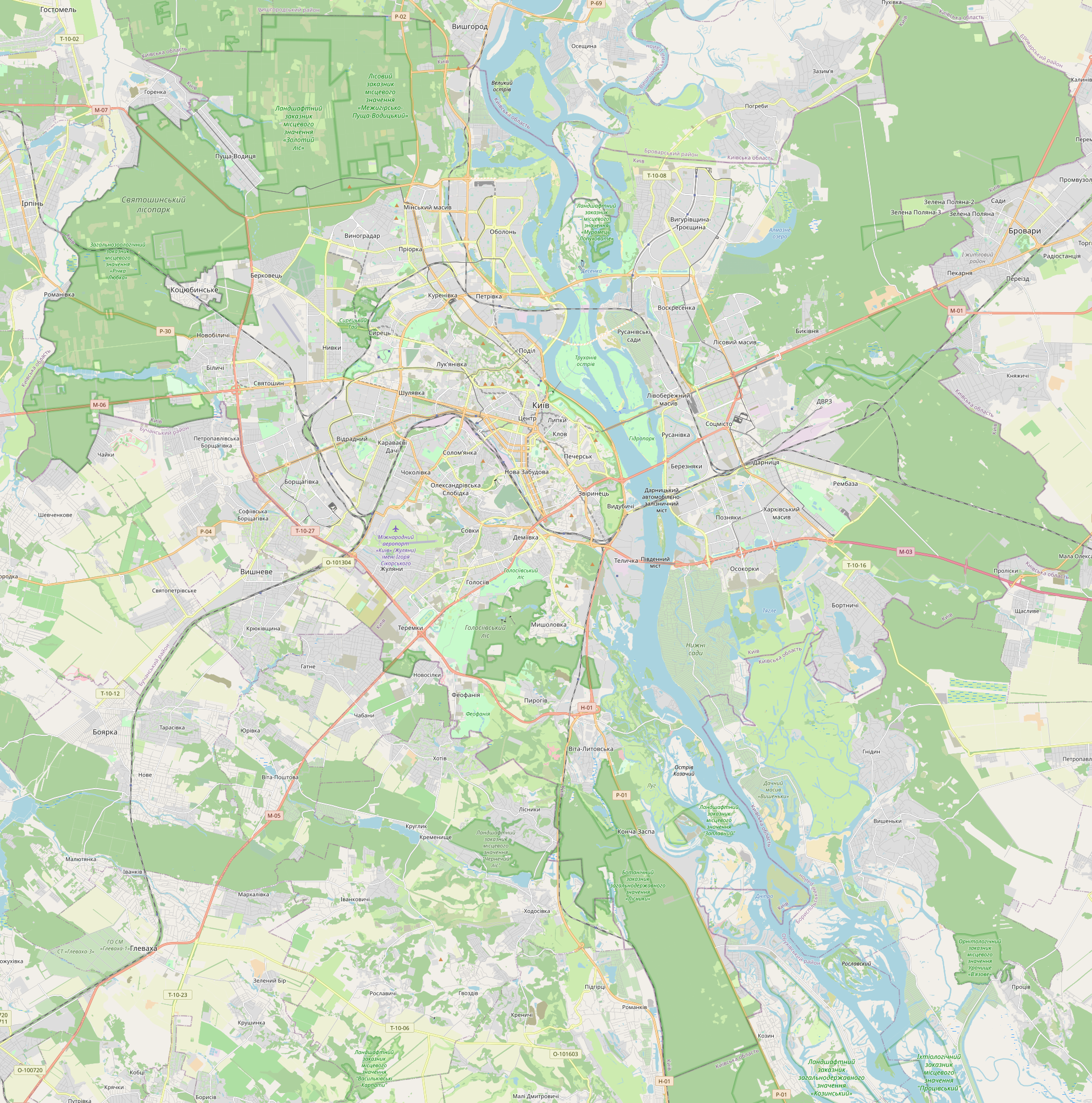
Kyiv city home venues of teams in the League
Lviv city home venues of teams in the League

=== Stadiums ===
The following stadiums are regarded as home grounds:

Rank	Stadium	Club	Capacity	Notes
1	NSC Olimpiyskiy	Dynamo Kyiv	70,050	
2	OSC Metalist	Shakhtar Donetsk	40,003	Used as home ground in round 7 and second half of season
3	Arena Lviv	Karpaty Lviv	34,915	
3	Arena Lviv	Shakhtar Donetsk	34,915	Used as home ground during first half of season
3	Arena Lviv	Olimpik Donetsk	34,915	Used as home ground in round 19
4	Chornomorets Stadium	Chornomorets Odesa	34,164	
5	Dnipro-Arena	Dnipro	31,003	
6	Yuvileiny Stadium	Olimpik Donetsk	25,830	Used as home ground during first half of season
7	Vorskla Stadium	Vorskla Poltava	24,795	
7	Vorskla Stadium	Olimpik Donetsk	24,795	Used as home ground in round 21
8	Meteor Stadium	Stal Kamianske	24,381	Used as home ground during season
9	Lobanovsky Dynamo Stadium	Olimpik Donetsk	16,873	Used as home ground in the second half
10	Zirka Stadium	Zirka Kropyvnytskyi	13,667	
10	Zirka Stadium	Olimpik Donetsk	13,667	Used as home ground in round 3
11	Avanhard Stadium	Volyn Lutsk	12,080	
12	Slavutych-Arena	Zorya Luhansk	11,883	Used as home ground during season
12	Slavutych-Arena	Zirka Kropyvnytskyi	11,883	Used as home ground in round 17
13	Tsentralnyi Stadion	Olimpik Donetsk	10,321	Used as home ground in round 17
14	CSC Nika Stadium	FC Oleksandriya	7,000	

=== Personnel and sponsorship ===
Team	President	Head coach	Captain	Kit manufacturer	Shirt sponsor
Chornomorets Odesa	Leonid Klimov	(Ukraine) Oleksandr Babych	(Ukraine) Serhiy Lyulka	Legea	2+2
Dnipro	Ihor Kolomoyskyi	(Ukraine) Dmytro Mykhaylenko (caretaker)	(Ukraine) Ruslan Rotan	Nike	Biola
Dynamo Kyiv	Ihor Surkis	(Ukraine) Serhii Rebrov	(Ukraine) Andriy Yarmolenko	adidas	— (Ostchem on the backside)
Karpaty Lviv	Petro Dyminskyi	(Belarus) Oleg Dulub	(Ukraine) Ihor Khudobyak	Joma	Pari-Match
FC Oleksandriya	Serhiy Kuzmenko	(Ukraine) Volodymyr Sharan	(Ukraine) Andriy Zaporozhan	Nike	UkrAhroKom
Olimpik Donetsk	Vladyslav Helzin	(Ukraine) Roman Sanzhar	(Ukraine) Dmytro Hryshko	Joma	Altkom
Shakhtar Donetsk	Rinat Akhmetov	(Portugal) Paulo Fonseca	(Croatia) Darijo Srna	Nike	SCM
Stal Kamianske	Vardan Israelian	(Belarus) Leonid Kuchuk	(Ukraine) Maksym Kalenchuk	Joma	ISD
Volyn Lutsk	Vitaliy Kvartsyanyi	(Ukraine) Vitaliy Kvartsyanyi	(Ukraine) Anatoliy Didenko	Joma	—
Vorskla Poltava	Roman Cherniak	(Ukraine) Vasyl Sachko	(Ukraine) Volodymyr Chesnakov	adidas	Ferrexpo
Zirka Kropyvnytskyi	Maksym Berezkin	(Ukraine) Roman Monaryov	(Argentina) Federico Pereyra	Joma	—
Zorya Luhansk	Yevhen Heller	(Ukraine) Yuriy Vernydub	(Ukraine) Mykyta Kamenyuka	Nike	—

=== Managerial changes ===
Team	Outgoing manager	Manner of departure	Date of vacancy	Table	Incoming manager	Date of appointment
Shakhtar Donetsk	(Romania) Mircea Lucescu	Resigned	21 May 2016	Pre-season	(Portugal) Paulo Fonseca	1 June 2016
Karpaty Lviv	(Ukraine) Volodymyr Bezubyak (Note: Volodymyr Bezubyak was a senior coach of Karpaty Lviv instead of a regular position of a head coach. The president Dyminsky came out with a new "know-how" and appointed Luzhnyi as a manager of all teams including the club's academy, while Bezubyak continued to coach the first team.)	End of contract	8 May 2016	Pre-season	(Ukraine) Valeriy Yaremchenko	6 June 2016 (Note: The Karpaty's official head coach Oleh Luzhnyi was not confirmed on the position of head coach of Karpaty Lviv for the upcoming season. He was fired for not achieving the club's goal, but to the press he denied that he was managing anything.)
Karpaty Lviv	(Ukraine) Valeriy Yaremchenko	Resigned	17 June 2016	Pre-season	(Ukraine) Anatoliy Chantsev (caretaker)	17 June 2016
Dnipro	(Ukraine) Myron Markevych	Resigned	30 June 2016	Pre-season	(Ukraine) Dmytro Mykhaylenko (caretaker)	30 June 2016
Karpaty Lviv	(Ukraine) Anatoliy Chantsev (caretaker)	Resigned (state of health)	5 July 2016	Pre-season	(Ukraine) Serhiy Zaytsev (caretaker)	5 July 2016
Stal Kamianske	(Netherlands) Erik van der Meer	Resigned (family circumstances)	10 August 2016	7th	(Netherlands) Joop Gall (caretaker) (Netherlands) Joop Gall	10 August 2016 permanent since 28 August 2016
Zirka Kropyvnytskyi	(Ukraine) Serhiy Lavrynenko	Mutual consent	19 August 2016	11th	(Argentina) Dario Drudi (caretaker)	19 August 2016
Karpaty Lviv	(Ukraine) Serhiy Zaytsev (caretaker)	End as caretaker	7 October 2016	12th	(Belarus) Oleg Dulub	7 October 2016
Zirka Kropyvnytskyi	(Argentina) Dario Drudi (caretaker)	Mutual consent	15 November 2016	9th	(Ukraine) Viktor Dohadailo (caretaker, until end of 2016) (Ukraine) Roman Monaryov (caretaker) (Note: Both Viktor Dohadailo and Roman Monaryov were announced as replacements for the resigned Argentinian specialist. The Premier League posts Dohadailo as the only head coach of the senior team after the coach substitution. Roman Monaryov became the only head coach since the start of 2017.)	15 November 2016
Stal Kamianske	(Netherlands) Joop Gall	Mutual consent	11 January 2017	9th (winter break)	(Belarus) Leonid Kuchuk	15 January 2017
Chornomorets Odesa	(Ukraine) Oleksandr Babych (caretaker)	Received "PRO" license	25 February 2017	7th (winter break)	(Ukraine) Oleksandr Babych	25 February 2017
Zirka Kropyvnytskyi	(Ukraine) Roman Monaryov (caretaker)	Signed permanent contract	11 May 2017	9th	(Ukraine) Roman Monaryov	11 May 2017

== First stage ==
=== First stage table ===
Pos	Team	Pld	W	D	L	GF	GA	GD	Pts	Qualification or relegation
1	Shakhtar Donetsk	22	19	3	0	47	14	+33	60	Qualification for the Championship round
2	Dynamo Kyiv	22	14	4	4	43	23	+20	46	Qualification for the Championship round
3	Zorya Luhansk	22	12	4	6	34	21	+13	40	Qualification for the Championship round
4	Olimpik Donetsk	22	9	7	6	28	30	−2	34	Qualification for the Championship round
5	FC Oleksandriya	22	9	6	7	37	28	+9	33	Qualification for the Championship round
6	Chornomorets Odesa	22	7	6	9	17	23	−6	27	Qualification for the Championship round
7	Vorskla Poltava	22	6	6	10	24	28	−4	24	Qualification for the Relegation round
8	Stal Kamianske	22	6	6	10	20	25	−5	24	Qualification for the Relegation round
9	Zirka Kropyvnytskyi	22	6	5	11	20	33	−13	23	Qualification for the Relegation round
10	Karpaty Lviv (Note: Karpaty Lviv was deducted six points according to a decision by FIFA Disciplinary Committee on 4 March 2016.)	22	4	7	11	21	30	−9	13	Qualification for the Relegation round
11	FC Dnipro (Note: FC Dnipro was deducted a total of 12 points (six points by the FIFA Disciplinary Committee for failing to clear their debts with former coach Juande Ramos and his assistants, and six points by the Ukrainian Premier League for failing to comply with the decision of FIFA Disciplinary Committee to pay debts to former player Danilo Sousa Campos).)	22	4	10	8	21	30	−9	10	Qualification for the Relegation round
12	Volyn Lutsk	22	2	4	16	13	40	−27	10	Qualification for the Relegation round

Source: UEFA, Ukrainian Premier League, Soccerway
Rules for classification: 1) Points; 2) Goal difference; 3) Goals scored; 4) Head-to-head points; 5) Head-to-head goal difference; 6) Head-to-head goals scored; 7) Draw.

=== First stage results ===
Home \ Away	CHO	DNI	DYK	KAR	OLK	OLD	STK	SHA	VOL	VOR	ZIR	ZOR
Chornomorets Odesa	—	0–0	1–1	1–0	1–0	3–0	0–1	1–4	0–0	1–2	2–1	0–0
Dnipro	1–1	—	1–2	1–1	1–4	1–1	1–1	0–2	5–0	1–1	0–1	2–0
Dynamo Kyiv	2–1	1–0	—	4–1	5–1	1–0	2–1	3–4	2–1	0–2	2–0	0–1
Karpaty Lviv	0–0	1–1	0–2	—	1–0	0–2	0–1	2–3	2–1	1–0	2–3	2–2
FC Oleksandriya	2–1	0–0	1–1	3–2	—	1–1	2–0	1–2	6–0	3–2	4–0	0–1
Olimpik Donetsk	1–0	3–0	0–4	0–0 (Note: Round 17 match not played due to frozen pitch at Yuvileny Stadium The game was postponed until spring of 2017, but no specific date was announced. On 8 March 2017 there surfaced an information that the game was scheduled to take place on 14 March 2017, yet no such information was posted at the website of Premier League. On 14 March 2017 the Ukrainian Premier League announced that the game would take place on 26 March in Cherkasy at the Central Stadium.)	0–2	—	0–0	1–1	2–1	3–2	4–2 (Note: Olympic Donetsk played their home match at Zirka Stadium)	0–2
Stal Kamianske	1–2	1–1	1–2	0–3	4–1	2–3	—	0–1	1–0	0–1	3–0	0–2
Shakhtar Donetsk	2–0	4–0	1–1	2–1	1–0	1–1	2–0	—	3–0	2–1	4–1	1–0
Volyn Lutsk	0–1	3–0	1–4	1–1	1–1	2–2	0–1	0–1	—	0–1	1–0	0–1
Vorskla Poltava	1–0	1–2	2–2	1–1	2–2	1–2	0–0	0–1	2–1	—	0–0	1–2
Zirka Kropyvnytskyi	0–1	1–1	2–0	1–0	1–1	1–2	0–0	0–3	2–0	2–0	—	1–1
Zorya Luhansk	4–0	2–3	1–2	2–1	1–2	3–0	2–2	1–2	2–0	2–1	2–1	—

Source: Ukrainian Premier League (in Ukrainian)
Legend: Blue = home team win; Yellow = draw; Red = away team win.

=== First stage positions by round ===
The following table represents the teams position after each round in the competition played chronologically.

Team ╲ Round	1	2	3	4	5	6	7	8	9	10	11	12	13	14	15	16	17	18	19	20	21	22
Shakhtar Donetsk	3	1	1	1	1	1	1	1	1	1	1	1	1	1	1	1	1	1	1	1	1	1
Dynamo Kyiv	2	2	2	2	2	2	2	3	3	2	2	3	3	2	2	2	2	2	2	2	2	2
Zorya Luhansk	4	4	3	3	3	3	3	2	2	3	3	2	2	3	3	3	3	3	3	3	3	3
Olimpik Donetsk	8	8	6	7	9	8	6	4	6	6	6	6	5	4	4	4	4	5	5	5	5	4
FC Oleksandriya	10	6	8	10	5	5	7	7	5	5	4	4	4	5	5	5	5	4	4	4	4	5
Chornomorets Odesa	6	11	11	9	6	6	5	5	4	4	5	5	6	6	6	6	6	7	6	6	6	6
Vorskla Poltava	5	5	5	5	4	4	4	6	7	7	7	7	7	7	7	7	7	6	7	7	7	7
Stal Kamianske	9	9	7	6	8	9	9	10	10	10	10	9	8	8	8	8	9	9	9	9	9	8
Zirka Kropyvnytskyi	7	7	9	11	11	11	11	9	9	9	8	8	9	9	9	9	8	8	8	8	8	9
Karpaty Lviv	12	12	12	12	12	12	12	12	12	12	12	12	12	12	12	12	12	12	12	12	10	10
Dnipro	1	3	4	4	7	7	8	8	8	8	9	10	11	11	11	11	10	11	11	11	12	11
Volyn Lutsk	11	10	10	8	10	10	10	11	11	11	11	11	10	10	10	10	11	10	10	10	11	12

== Championship round ==
=== Championship round table ===
Pos	Team	Pld	W	D	L	GF	GA	GD	Pts	Qualification or relegation
1	Shakhtar Donetsk (C)	32	25	5	2	66	24	+42	80	Qualification for the Champions League group stage
2	Dynamo Kyiv	32	21	4	7	69	33	+36	67	Qualification for the Champions League third qualifying round
3	Zorya Luhansk	32	16	6	10	45	31	+14	54	Qualification for the Europa League group stage (Note: Since winners of 2016–17 Ukrainian Cup, Shakhtar Donetsk, qualified for European competition based on their league position, the spot awarded to the cup winner (Europa League group stage) was passed to the third-placed team and the spot for the third-placed team (Europa League third qualifying round) was passed to the fifth-placed team.)
4	Olimpik Donetsk	32	11	11	10	33	44	−11	44	Qualification for the Europa League third qualifying round
5	FC Oleksandriya	32	10	10	12	41	43	−2	40	Qualification for the Europa League third qualifying round
6	Chornomorets Odesa	32	10	8	14	25	37	−12	38	

Source: UEFA, Ukrainian Premier League, Soccerway
Rules for classification: 1) Points; 2) Goal difference; 3) Goals scored; 4) Head-to-head points; 5) Head-to-head goal difference; 6) Head-to-head goals scored; 7) Draw.
(C) Champions

=== Championship round results ===
Home \ Away	CHO	DYK	OLK	OLD	SHA	ZOR
Chornomorets Odesa	—	1–4	1–0	0–0	0–3	0–1
Dynamo Kyiv	2–1	—	6–0	4–0	0–1	1–2
FC Oleksandriya	1–1	1–4	—	1–0	1–1	0–0
Olimpik Donetsk	1–0	2–1	0–0	—	0–4	1–1
Shakhtar Donetsk	1–2	2–3	1–0	1–1	—	3–2
Zorya Luhansk	1–2	0–1	1–0	2–0	1–2	—

Source: Ukrainian Premier League (in Ukrainian)
Legend: Blue = home team win; Yellow = draw; Red = away team win.

=== Championship round positions by round ===
Team ╲ Round	23	24	25	26	27	28	29	30	31	32
Shakhtar Donetsk	1	1	1	1	1	1	1	1	1	1
Dynamo Kyiv	2	2	2	2	2	2	2	2	2	2
Zorya Luhansk	3	3	3	3	3	3	3	3	3	3
Olimpik Donetsk	4	4	4	6	6	4	4	4	4	4
FC Oleksandriya	5	5	5	4	4	5	5	5	5	5
Chornomorets Odesa	6	6	6	5	5	6	6	6	6	6

== Relegation round ==
=== Relegation round table ===
Pos	Team	Pld	W	D	L	GF	GA	GD	Pts	Qualification or relegation
7	Vorskla Poltava (Note: Vorskla Poltava was awarded the UPL Prestige Trophy for winning the consolation tournament.)	32	11	9	12	32	32	0	42	
8	Stal Kamianske	32	11	8	13	27	31	−4	41	
9	Zirka Kropyvnytskyi	32	9	7	16	29	43	−14	34	
10	Karpaty Lviv (Note: Karpaty Lviv was deducted six points according to a decision by FIFA Disciplinary Committee on 4 March 2016.)	32	9	9	14	35	41	−6	30	
11	FC Dnipro (Note: FC Dnipro was deducted a total of 24 points (six points by the FIFA Disciplinary Committee for failing to clear their debts with former coach Juande Ramos and his assistants, six points by the Ukrainian Premier League for failing to comply with the decision of FIFA Disciplinary Committee to pay debts to former player Danilo Sousa Campos, three more points by the FFU Control and Disciplinary Committee for failing execute one of the decisions of the committee, and 9 more points on 9 June 2017, after the end of the tournament.). On the decision of FIFA, FFU enforced relegation of FC Dnipro straight to the Second League, skipping the First League. In a near future FFU will adopt a decision which team will be replacing Dnipro in the First League.) (R)	32	8	13	11	31	40	−9	13	Relegation to Ukrainian Second League
12	Volyn Lutsk (Note: Volyn Lutsk was deducted six points on the request of Football Federation of Ukraine which received a letter from the FIFA Disciplinary Committee on 11 May 2017 urging to implement its decision of 15 March 2017, due to debts with former player Saša Stević.) (R)	32	4	4	24	17	51	−34	10	Relegation to Ukrainian First League

Source: UEFA, Ukrainian Premier League, Soccerway
Rules for classification: 1) Points; 2) Goal difference; 3) Goals scored; 4) Head-to-head points; 5) Head-to-head goal difference; 6) Head-to-head goals scored; 7) Draw.
(R) Relegated

=== Relegation round results ===
Home \ Away	DNI	KAR	STK	VOL	VOR	ZIR
Dnipro	—	2–3	0–0	0–3 (Note: On 31 May 2017, the game Dnipro vs Volyn was interrupted on the 50th minute with a score of 1–0, due to security reasons. The final decision of the game result was adapted by the FFU Control-Disciplinary Committee on 27 June 2017. Dnipro were awarded a technical loss 0–3.)	2–0	1–0
Karpaty Lviv	2–2	—	2–0	1–0	0–1	2–1
Stal Kamianske	0–1	2–1	—	2–0	0–0	1–0
Volyn Lutsk	0–1	0–1	0–1	—	0–1	1–0
Vorskla Poltava	1–0	0–0	2–0	2–0	—	1–1
Zirka Kropyvnytskyi	1–1	3–2	0–1	2–0	1–0	—

Source: Ukrainian Premier League (in Ukrainian)
Legend: Blue = home team win; Yellow = draw; Red = away team win.

=== Relegation round positions by round ===
Team ╲ Round	23	24	25	26	27	28	29	30	31	32
Vorskla Poltava	7	7	7	8	7	7	8	7	7	7
Stal Kamianske	8	8	8	7	8	8	7	8	8	8
Zirka Kropyvnytskyi	9	9	9	9	9	9	9	9	9	9
Karpaty Lviv	10	10	10	10	10	10	10	10	10	10
Dnipro	11	11	12	11	11	11	11	11	11	11
Volyn Lutsk	12	12	11	12	12	12	12	12	12	12

== Season statistics ==
=== Top goalscorers ===
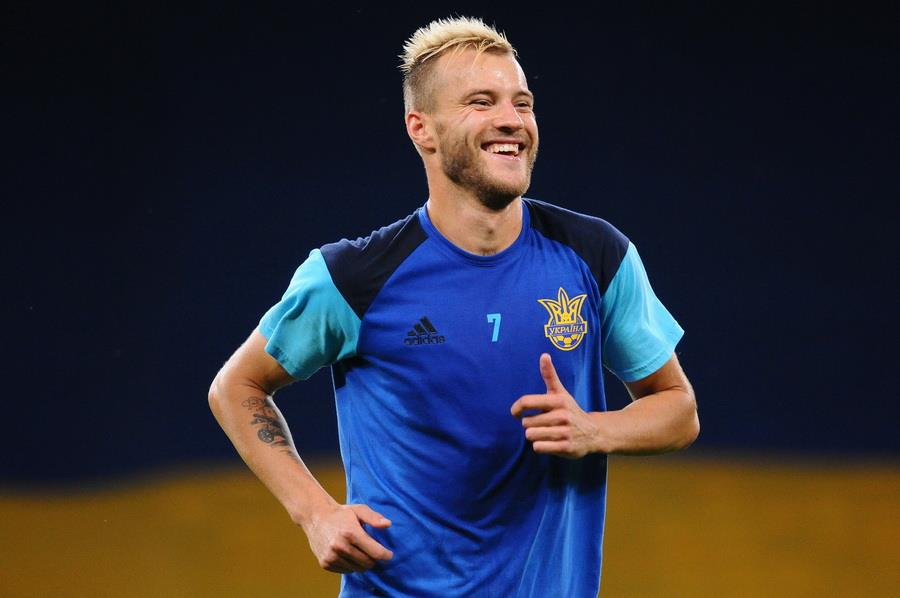
Yarmolenko in 2016

The season top goalscorers were:

Rank	Player	Club	Goals (Pen.)
1	(Ukraine) Andriy Yarmolenko	Dynamo Kyiv	15 (5)
2	(Argentina) Facundo Ferreyra	Shakhtar Donetsk	13 (1)
3	(Argentina) Gustavo Blanco Leschuk	Karpaty / Shakhtar	11
4	(Brazil) Júnior Moraes (Note: On 28 February 2017 it was officially announced that Moraes was loaned out to the Chinese Tianjin Quanjian F.C.)	Dynamo Kyiv	10 (2)
5	(Ukraine) Artem Besyedin	Dynamo Kyiv	9
5	(Ukraine) Denys Harmash	Dynamo Kyiv	9
7	(Ukraine) Dmytro Khlyobas	Vorskla Poltava	8
8	(Ukraine) Viktor Kovalenko	Shakhtar Donetsk	7
8	(Ukraine) Anton Postupalenko	Olimpik Donetsk	7
8	(Ghana) Kwame Karikari	Stal Kamianske	7 (1)
8	(Ukraine) Dmytro Korkishko	Chornomorets Odesa	7 (1)

=== Hat-tricks ===
Player	For	Against	Result	Date
(Brazil) Júnior Moraes	Dynamo Kyiv	Oleksandriya	5–1	23 July 2016
(Ukraine) Andriy Bohdanov	Olimpik Donetsk	Dnipro	3–0	11 September 2016
(Brazil) Júnior Moraes	Dynamo Kyiv	Volyn Lutsk	4–1	26 November 2016
(Ukraine) Stanislav Kulish^{(4)}	Oleksandriya	Volyn Lutsk	6–0	25 February 2017
(Ghana) Kwame Karikari	Stal Kamianske	Oleksandriya	4–1	18 March 2017

^{(number)} Player scored (number) goals if more than 3

Away win
Home win
Draw

== Awards ==
=== Monthly awards ===
On 16 November 2016, the Premier League administration announced start of voting for the Best player of the month.

Month	Player of the Month		
Month	Player	Club	Reference
October 2016	(Ukraine) Roman Yaremchuk	FC Oleksandriya	
November 2016	(Brazil) Marlos	Shakhtar Donetsk	
March 2017	(Ukraine) Ihor Khudobyak	Karpaty Lviv	
April 2017	(Ukraine) Oleksandr Hladkyy	Karpaty Lviv	
May 2017	(Brazil) Marlos	Shakhtar Donetsk	

=== Round awards ===
On 17 November 2016, the Premier League administration along with Pari-Match introduced another award, "Best player of the round". On 1 March 2017, the All-Ukrainian association of Football Coaches introduced award "Best coach of the round".

Round	Player			Coach		
Round	Player	Club	Reference	Coach	Club	Reference
Round 15	(Ukraine) Valeriy Luchkevych	FC Dnipro				
Round 16	(Ukraine) Viktor Kovalenko	Shakhtar Donetsk				
Round 17	(Ukraine) Vladyslav Kocherhin	FC Dnipro				
Round 18	(Brazil) Fred	Shakhtar Donetsk				
Round 19	(Ukraine) Stanislav Kulish	FC Oleksandriya		(Ukraine) Serhii Rebrov	Dynamo Kyiv	
Round 20	(Ukraine) Ihor Khudobyak	Karpaty Lviv		(Ukraine) Yuriy Vernydub	Zorya Luhansk	
Round 21	(Ukraine) Aderinsola Habib Eseola	Zirka Kropyvnytskyi		(Ukraine) Roman Monaryov	Zirka Kropyvnytskyi	
Round 22	(Ghana) Kwame Karikari	Stal Kamianske		(Belarus) Leonid Kuchuk	Stal Kamianske	
Round 23	(Ukraine) Andriy Yarmolenko	Dynamo Kyiv		(Belarus) Oleg Dulub	Karpaty Lviv	
Round 24	(Brazil) Jorge Elias	Chornomorets Odesa		(Ukraine) Oleksandr Babych	Chornomorets Odesa	
Round 25	(Ukraine) Denys Harmash	Dynamo Kyiv		(Ukraine) Serhii Rebrov	Dynamo Kyiv	
Round 26	(Ukraine) Dmytro Korkishko	Chornomorets Odesa		(Portugal) Paulo Fonseca	Shakhtar Donetsk	
Round 27	(Ukraine) Andriy Yarmolenko	Dynamo Kyiv		(Ukraine) Vasyl Sachko	Vorskla Poltava	
Round 28	(Ukraine) Denys Harmash	Dynamo Kyiv		(Belarus) Leonid Kuchuk	Stal Kamianske	
Round 29	(Argentina) Gustavo Blanco Leschuk	Shakhtar Donetsk		(Ukraine) Roman Sanzhar	Olimpik Donetsk	
Round 30	(Nigeria) Emmanuel Bonaventure Dennis	Zorya Luhansk		(Ukraine) Dmytro Mykhaylenko	FC Dnipro	
Round 31	(Ukraine) Andriy Yarmolenko	Dynamo Kyiv		(Ukraine) Yuriy Vernydub	Zorya Luhansk	
Round 32	(Ukraine) Ivan Petryak	Zorya Luhansk		(Ukraine) Volodymyr Sharan	FC Oleksandriya	

=== Season awards ===
The laureates of the 2016–17 UPL season were:

- Best player: (Ukraine) Andriy Yarmolenko (Dynamo Kyiv)
- Best coach: (Portugal) Paulo Fonseca (Shakhtar Donetsk)
- Best goalkeeper: (Ukraine) Andriy Pyatov (Shakhtar Donetsk)
- Best arbiter: (Ukraine) Anatoliy Abdula (Kharkiv)
- Best young player: (Ukraine) Artem Dovbyk (FC Dnipro)
- Best goalscorer: (Ukraine) Andriy Yarmolenko (Dynamo Kyiv)

=== Top 33 ===
On 6 June 2017, the Ukrainian Premier League named its list of 33 top players:

Goalkeepers

1. (Ukraine) Andriy Pyatov (Shakhtar Donetsk)
2. (Ukraine) Andriy Lunin (Dnipro)
3. (Georgia (country)) Zauri Makharadze (Olimpik Donetsk)

Right backs

1. (Croatia) Darijo Srna (Shakhtar Donetsk)
2. (Ukraine) Mykola Morozyuk (Dynamo Kyiv)
3. (Ukraine) Oleh Danchenko (Chornomorets Odesa)

Right-centre backs

1. (Croatia) Domagoj Vida (Dynamo Kyiv)
2. (Georgia (country)) Davit Khocholava (Chornomorets Odesa)
3. (Brazil) Rafael Forster (Zorya Luhansk)

Left-centre backs

1. (Ukraine) Yaroslav Rakitskyi (Shakhtar Donetsk)
2. (Ukraine) Anton Shendrik (Oleksandriya)
3. (Ukraine) Yevhen Khacheridi (Dynamo Kyiv)

Left backs

1. (Brazil) Ismaily (Shakhtar Donetsk)
2. (Ukraine) Mykola Matviyenko (Shakhtar Donetsk/Karpaty Lviv)
3. (Ukraine) Eduard Sobol (Zorya Luhansk)

Defensive midfielders

1. (Ukraine) Taras Stepanenko (Shakhtar Donetsk)
2. (Brazil) Fred (Shakhtar Donetsk)
3. (Ukraine) Maksym Malyshev (Shakhtar Donetsk)

Right midfielders

1. (Brazil) Marlos (Shakhtar Donetsk)
2. (Nigeria) Dennis Bonaventure (Zorya Luhansk)
3. (Ukraine) Dmytro Korkishko (Chornomorets Odesa)

Centre midfielders

1. (Ukraine) Serhiy Sydorchuk (Dynamo Kyiv)
2. (Ukraine) Ruslan Rotan (Dnipro)
3. (Ukraine) Volodymyr Shepelev (Dynamo Kyiv)

Left midfielders

1. (Ukraine) Denys Harmash (Dynamo Kyiv)
2. (Ukraine) Anton Postupalenko (Olimpik Donetsk)
3. (Ukraine) Vasyl Hrytsuk (Oleksandriya)

Right forwards

1. (Ukraine) Artem Besedin (Dynamo Kyiv)
2. (Ukraine) Artem Dovbyk (Dnipro)
3. (Argentina) Facundo Ferreyra (Shakhtar Donetsk)

Left forwards

1. (Ukraine) Andriy Yarmolenko (Dynamo Kyiv)
2. (Brazil) Taison (Shakhtar Donetsk)
3. (Ukraine) Ivan Petryak (Zorya Luhansk)

== Scandals ==
=== FIFA sanctions ===
Number of sanctions were implemented by FIFA against some Ukrainian clubs due to their refuse to follow their contractual agreements with players and coaching staff.

In summer of 2016 FIFA imposed sanctions against FC Volyn Lutsk due to the "Ramon Lopes case" denying Volyn the right to register new players other than out of own academy (sport school). The sanctions were in place until 1 March 2017. On 24 February 2017 it became known that sanctions were extended to the end of season.

Separate and much bigger sanctions were implemented against FC Dnipro for number of instances among which are cases with Danilo Sousa Campos, Juande Ramos and others (see above). Before the winter break the club had 12 tournament points deducted, while more sanctions are anticipated to be introduced.

The FIFA sanctions were also implemented against FC Karpaty Lviv due to the "Semir Štilić case" (see above).

=== Other scandals ===
Previous agreement between Chornomorets and Zorya provided the Luhansk club with the Chornomorets home venue in Odesa for the 2016–17 UEFA Europa League. However the Odesa club failed to payback revenue to Zorya from tickets that were sold for the games. Zorya Luhansk took this case to court, while Chornomorets Odesa has paid portion of the debt already.

== See also ==
- 2016–17 Ukrainian First League
- 2016–17 Ukrainian Second League
- 2016–17 Ukrainian Cup
- List of Ukrainian football transfers summer 2016
- List of Ukrainian football transfers winter 2016–17
