= FC Olimpik Donetsk =

Olimpik Donetsk
- Full name: FC Olimpik Donetsk
- Founded: 2001; 25 years ago
- Dissolved: 2022
- Ground: Sports Complex Olimpik, Donetsk (main ground); Temporary locations, due to War in Donbas: Bannikov Stadium, Kyiv (2014–2016); Yuvileiny Stadium, Sumy (August – December 2016); Stadion Yuri Gagarin, Chernihiv (2021, due to COVID-19 pandemic); Lobanovsky Dynamo Stadium, Kyiv; Yunist Stadium, Chernihiv (2021)
- Capacity: 3,000
- President: Andriy Horeltsev
- 2021–22: Ukrainian First League, 11th of 16
- Website: olimpik.com.ua
Home colours	Away colours

Old emblem (2001–2019)

FC Olimpik Donetsk (Ukrainian: «Олімпік» Донецьк [oˈl⁽ʲ⁾impiɡ doˈnɛtsʲk]) is a Ukrainian inactive football team based in Donetsk, Ukraine. The club currently doesn't play in any Ukrainian competition due to the 2022 Russian invasion of Ukraine. Since its promotion to Ukrainian Premier League in 2014, it played its games in Kyiv due to the war in Donbas. During the 2016–17 Ukrainian Premier League, there were attempts to move the club either to Sumy or Cherkasy, which were never realized.

On 21 June 2023 the 31st PFL Conference excluded several clubs that did not compete in the 2022–23 season and did not renew their membership.

== History ==
The football club Olimpik Donetsk was formed in 2001 along with a charity regional fund of football development.

The club was meant to rely on players from its academy. Olimpik Donetsk entered the professional competition in 2004. After six seasons Druha Liha Olympik became champions in the 2010–11 season and were promoted to the Persha Liha. Olympik became the champions of the 2013–14 Ukrainian First League and earned promotion to the Ukrainian Premier League. They play at their stadium "Olimpik".

The clubs has several youth teams that play in youth competitions under the name "Olimpik-UOR" (Olimpik – Uchylyshche of Olympiyskoho Rezervu). Since 2009, UOR Donetsk and Olimpik have agreement about mutual training of young footballers.

Since its promotion to the Ukrainian Premier League in 2014, the club is forced to play its games in Kyiv.

The Olimpik Donetsk participation in the 2019–20 season was under question because both of its youth teams (U-21 and U-19) were expelled from the Ukrainian Premier League due to match fixing, and are banned from competitions until the end of 2019–20 season. One of the conditions to receive a season license in UPL was presence of youth teams in a club. The league members voted to keep Olimpik's senior team in the league, yet final decision was reserved for the UAF (formerly FFU) Executive Committee. On 18 June 2019, the UAF Executive Committee approved the League's decision about Olimpik and later explained that it made changes to its regulations where clubs will not be penalized for having its youth teams banned from the UPL competitions as long as the club will sponsor other youth teams. On 9 July 2019 Olimpik filed a lawsuit against UAF to the Court of Arbitration for Sport about falsification of a case against the club and sanctions that were introduced against the club. At the end of July in media appeared information that the club might have withdrawn its lawsuit from the CAS.

In July 2021, the president of the club Vladyslav Helzin announced that the club is withdrawing from all competitions for the 2021/22 season and suspends its activities.

== Infrastructures ==
The main ground in Sports Complex Olimpik in Donetsk, but due to the war in Donbas, from 2014 until 2016 the team was moved to Bannikov Stadium in Kyiv. From August 2016 until December 2016 the team played in the Yuvileiny Stadium in Sumy. In 2016, due to COVID-19 pandemic the team played in Stadion Yuri Gagarin in Chernihiv and then to Lobanovsky Dynamo Stadium, Kyiv in the same year. On 5 October 2021 the club played in Yunist Stadium in Chernihiv for the Ukrainian First League for the season 2021-22 in the option to play all season.

== Honours ==
- Ukrainian First League
  - Winners: 2013–14
- Ukrainian Second League – Group B
  - Winners: 2010–11

== League and cup history ==
Season	Div.	Pos.	Pl.	W	D	L	GS	GA	P	Domestic Cup	Europe		Notes
2004	4th (1st round) (Amatory)	4	6	1	2	3	9	14	5				obtained professional status during season
2004–05	3rd "B" (Druha Liha)	11	28	8	3	17	33	54	27				
2005–06	3rd "B" (Druha Liha)	5	24	13	2	9	42	28	41	1/32 finals			
2006–07	3rd "B" (Druha Liha)	10	28	8	8	12	35	41	32	1/16 finals			
2007–08	3rd "B" (Druha Liha)	6	34	19	6	9	66	41	63	1/16 finals			
2008–09	3rd "B" (Druha Liha)	6	34	16	9	9	55	32	57	1/32 finals			
2009–10	3rd "B" (Druha Liha)	5	26	15	4	7	45	28	49	1/64 finals			
2010–11	3rd "B" (Druha Liha)	1	22	17	2	3	45	15	53	1/32 finals			Promoted
2011–12	2nd (Persha Liha)	12	34	11	7	16	38	44	40	1/32 finals			
2012–13	2nd (Persha Liha)	11	34	15	4	15	34	37	49	1/32 finals			
2013–14	2nd (Persha Liha)	1	30	16	7	7	45	33	55	1/32 finals			Promoted
2014–15	1st (Premier Liha)	8	26	7	5	14	24	64	26	1/2 finals			
2015–16	1st (Premier Liha)	9	26	6	7	13	22	35	25	1/8 finals			
2016–17	1st (Premier Liha)	4	32	11	11	10	33	44	44	1/16 finals			
2017–18	1st (Premier Liha)	9	32	9	9	14	29	38	36	1/8 finals	EL	3Q	
2018–19	1st (Premier Liha)	9	32	7	13	12	41	48	34	1/8 finals			
2019–20	1st (Premier Liha)	9	32	10	6	16	32	47	36	1/8 finals			
2020–21	1st (Premier Liha)	13	26	6	4	16	28	48	22	1/16 finals			Relegated
2021–22	2nd (Persha Liha)	11	19	7	2	10	19	23	23	1/32 finals			All football competitions were suspended or abandoned on April 26 due to the 2022 Russian invasion of Ukraine.

== European record ==
Season	Competition	Round	Club	Home	Away	Aggregate
2017–18	UEFA Europa League	3Q	(Greece) PAOK FC	1–1	0–2	1–3

== Coaches and administration ==
Administration	Coaching (senior team)	Coaching (junior teams)
President – TBA; Sports director – Oleksiy Antonov; Development director – Dmytro Kononov; Technical director – Oleksandr Protsiv	Head coach – Serhiy Litovchenko; Assistant coach – Vitaliy Rozhon; Goalies coach – Yuriy Klymenko	U-21 head coach – Viktor Kuryata; U-19 head coach – Ihor Yermakov; Goalies coach –

== Presidents and other officials ==
=== Presidents ===
- 2001–2021: Vladyslav Helzin

=== General directors ===
- 2017 – present Oleksiy Antonov

=== Executive directors ===
- 2017 – present Dmytro Andreyev

=== Sports directors ===
- 2001 – 2017 Oleksiy Antonov
- 2019 – present Maksym Kovalenko

=== Directors ===
- 2006 – 2019 Oleksandr Protsiv

== Managers ==
- (Ukraine) Yuriy Karmelyuk (2003–2005)
- (Ukraine) Ihor Petrov (2005–2012)
- (Ukraine) Roman Pylypchuk (2012–2013)
- (Ukraine) Roman Sanzhar (2013–2018)
- (Ukraine) Vyacheslav Shevchuk (2018–2019)
- (Ukraine) Ihor Klymovskyi (interim) (2019)
- (Brazil) Júlio César (2019)
- (Ukraine) Ihor Klymovskyi (interim) (2019)
- (Spain) Vicente Gómez (2019–2020)
- (Ukraine) Ihor Klymovskyi (2020–2021)
- (Ukraine) Yuriy Kalitvintsev (2021)
- (Ukraine) Roman Sanzhar (2021)
- (Ukraine) Serhiy Litovchenko (2021)

== See also ==
- Serhiy Bubka College of Olympic Reserve, formerly a school of Olympic Reserve in Donetsk (UOR Donetsk)
