= Ivan Petryak =

Ukrainian footballer (born 1994)

Ivan Petriak
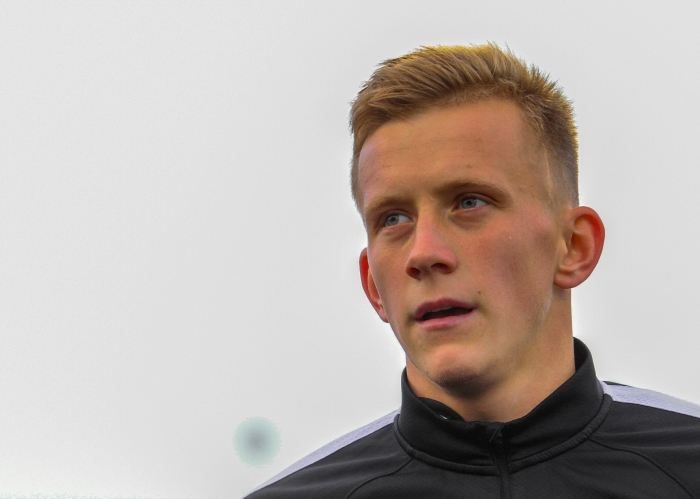
- Petriak in 2017

Personal information
- Full name: Ivan Yevhenovych Petryak
- Date of birth: 13 March 1994 (age 32)
- Place of birth: Smila, Ukraine
- Height: 1.71 m (5 ft 7 in)
- Position: Midfielder

Team information
- Current team: FC Kudrivka
- Number: 7

Youth career
- 2005–2007: Sports School #15 Kyiv
- 2007–2008: Olympic Reserve School Kyiv
- 2008–2010: Knyazha Shchaslyve
- 2010–2011: RVUFK Kyiv

Senior career*
| Years | Team | Apps | (Gls) |
| 2011–2016 | Zorya Luhansk | 59 | (4) |
| 2016–2019 | Shakhtar Donetsk | 14 | (1) |
| 2016–2017 | → Zorya Luhansk (loan) | 28 | (5) |
| 2018–2019 | → Ferencváros (loan) | 28 | (6) |
| 2019–2022 | Fehérvár | 96 | (24) |
| 2022– | Shakhtar Donetsk | 13 | (1) |
| 2024 | → Polissya Zhytomyr (loan) | 7 | (0) |
| 2024 | → Chornomorets Odesa (loan) | 10 | (0) |
| 2026– | FC Kudrivka | 8 | (1) |

International career^{‡}
| 2012 | Ukraine U18 | 6 | (1) |
| 2013 | Ukraine U19 | 2 | (0) |
| 2014 | Ukraine U20 | 1 | (0) |
| 2015 | Ukraine U21 | 6 | (1) |
| 2016– | Ukraine | 5 | (0) |
- * Club domestic league appearances and goals as of 27 October 2026 ‡ National team caps and goals as of 10 October 2018

Ivan Yevhenovych Petriak (Ukrainian: Іван Євгенович Петряк; born 13 March 1994) is a Ukrainian professional footballer who plays as a midfielder for Ukrainian Premier League side Kudrivka. Since 2012, he has played for the junior and youth national team of Ukraine. In March 2016, he made his senior debut for the Ukraine national team.

== Career ==
He made his debut for the main FC Zorya team as a substitute in the second half in a match against Shakhtar Donetsk in the Ukrainian Premier League on 2 October 2011.

On 28 February 2016, he signed a contract with Shakhtar Donetsk for the next season.

On 9 July 2018, Petryak moved to the Hungarian club Ferencvárosi TC. In July 2019 Petryak moved to the Hungarian club Fehérvár FC.

On 22 August 2022, he signed a contract with Shakhtar Donetsk for the next season.

In August 2024 he went on loan to Ukrainian Premier League side FC Chornomorets Odesa, making his debut against Livyi Bereh on 26 August 2024. On 31 December 2024 the player ended his loan to Chornomorets Odesa.

On 25 July 2026, he signed a contract with Kudrivka.

== Career statistics ==
As of 15 May 2022.

Appearances and goals by club, season and competition
| Club | Season | League | | | Cup | | Continental | | Other | | Total | |
| Club | Season | Division | Apps | Goals | Apps | Goals | Apps | Goals | Apps | Goals | Apps | Goals |
|---|---|---|---|---|---|---|---|---|---|---|---|---|
| Zorya Luhansk | 2011–12 | Ukrainian Premier League | 6 | 0 | 1 | 0 | — | | — | | 7 | 0 |
| Zorya Luhansk | 2012–13 | Ukrainian Premier League | 3 | 0 | 0 | 0 | — | | — | | 3 | 0 |
| Zorya Luhansk | 2013–14 | Ukrainian Premier League | 18 | 1 | 1 | 0 | — | | — | | 19 | 1 |
| Zorya Luhansk | 2014–15 | Ukrainian Premier League | 10 | 1 | 1 | 0 | 1 | 0 | — | | 12 | 1 |
| Zorya Luhansk | 2015–16 | Ukrainian Premier League | 22 | 2 | 7 | 2 | 4 | 0 | — | | 33 | 4 |
| Zorya Luhansk | 2016–17 | Ukrainian Premier League | 28 | 5 | 0 | 0 | 6 | 0 | — | | 34 | 5 |
| Zorya Luhansk | Total | | 87 | 9 | 10 | 2 | 11 | 0 | 0 | 0 | 108 | 11 |
| Shakhtar Donetsk | 2017–18 | Ukrainian Premier League | 14 | 1 | 2 | 1 | 1 | 0 | 0 | 0 | 17 | 2 |
| Ferencváros | 2018–19 | Nemzeti Bajnokság I | 28 | 6 | 6 | 0 | 2 | 0 | — | | 36 | 6 |
| Fehérvár | 2019–20 | Nemzeti Bajnokság I | 33 | 6 | 8 | 0 | 4 | 0 | — | | 45 | 6 |
| Fehérvár | 2020–21 | Nemzeti Bajnokság I | 33 | 12 | 5 | 1 | 4 | 0 | — | | 42 | 13 |
| Fehérvár | 2021–22 | Nemzeti Bajnokság I | 27 | 6 | 2 | 2 | 2 | 0 | — | | 31 | 8 |
| Fehérvár | Total | | 93 | 24 | 15 | 3 | 10 | 0 | 0 | 0 | 118 | 27 |
| Career total | | | 222 | 40 | 33 | 6 | 24 | 0 | 0 | 0 | 279 | 46 |

== Honours ==
Shakhtar Donetsk

- Ukrainian Premier League: 2017–18
- Ukrainian Cup: 2017–18

Ferencváros

- Nemzeti Bajnokság I: 2018–19

Individual

- Golden talent of Ukraine: 2015 (U-21)
