= Maksym Salamakha =

Ukrainian footballer

Personal information
- Full name: Maksym Olehovych Salamakha
- Date of birth: 17 July 1996 (age 30)
- Place of birth: Lviv, Ukraine
- Height: 1.82 m (5 ft 11 1/2 in)
- Position: Forward

Youth career
- 2003–2006: Karpaty Lviv
- 2006–2011: Lviv
- 2012–2013: Metalist Kharkiv

Senior career*
Years	Team	Apps	(Gls)
2013–2014	Metalist Kharkiv	0	(0)
2014–2016	Dnipro Dnipropetrovsk	0	(0)
2016–2018	Karpaty Lviv	4	(0)
2018	Veres Rivne	14	(1)
- * Club domestic league appearances and goals as of 12 November 2018

Maksym Salamakha (Ukrainian: Максим Олегович Саламаха; born 17 July 1996) is a professional Ukrainian football striker.

Salamakha is the product of the Karpaty Lviv, FC Lviv and FC Metalist School Systems. He played for FC Metalist and FC Dnipro in the Ukrainian Premier League Reserves and Under 19 Championship, but never made a senior team appearances. In July 2016 he signed a three-year contract with his native city's team FC Karpaty. He made his debut for FC Karpaty as a substituted player in the second half of a game against FC Stal Kamianske on 23 July 2016 in the Ukrainian Premier League.
