= Yuriy Karmelyuk =

Ukrainian footballer and manager

Personal information
- Full name: Yuriy Anatoliyovych Karmelyuk
- Date of birth: 2 July 1971
- Place of birth: Ukrainian SSR, Soviet Union
- Date of death: 13 July 2008 (aged 37)
- Place of death: Donetsk, Ukraine
- Height: 1.78 m (5 ft 10 in)
- Position: Midfielder

Senior career*
Years	Team	Apps	(Gls)
1990	Shakhtar Donetsk	0	(0)
1991	SKA Kiev	8	(0)
1992–1993	FC Uholyok Donetsk	23	(0)
1993–1995	FC Aton Donetsk	45	(0)
1995	Skala Stryi	2	(0)
1996–1997	Metalurh Donetsk	69	(0)
1997	→ Metalurh-2 Donetsk	3	(0)
1998–1999	Lada Dimitrovgrad	51	(1)
2003–2005	Olimpik Donetsk	11	(0)
2007–2008	Tytan Donetsk	27	(0)
Total		239	(1)

Managerial career
- 2003–2005: Olimpik Donetsk
- 2007–2008: Tytan Donetsk
- * Club domestic league appearances and goals

Yuriy Karmelyuk (Ukrainian: Юрій Анатолійович Кармелюк; born 2 July 1971) was a Ukrainian footballer and manager.

He is known as one of the coaches of FC Olimpik Donetsk.
