= Olimpik Sports Complex =

Football stadium in Donetsk, Ukraine

Sports Complex Olimpik
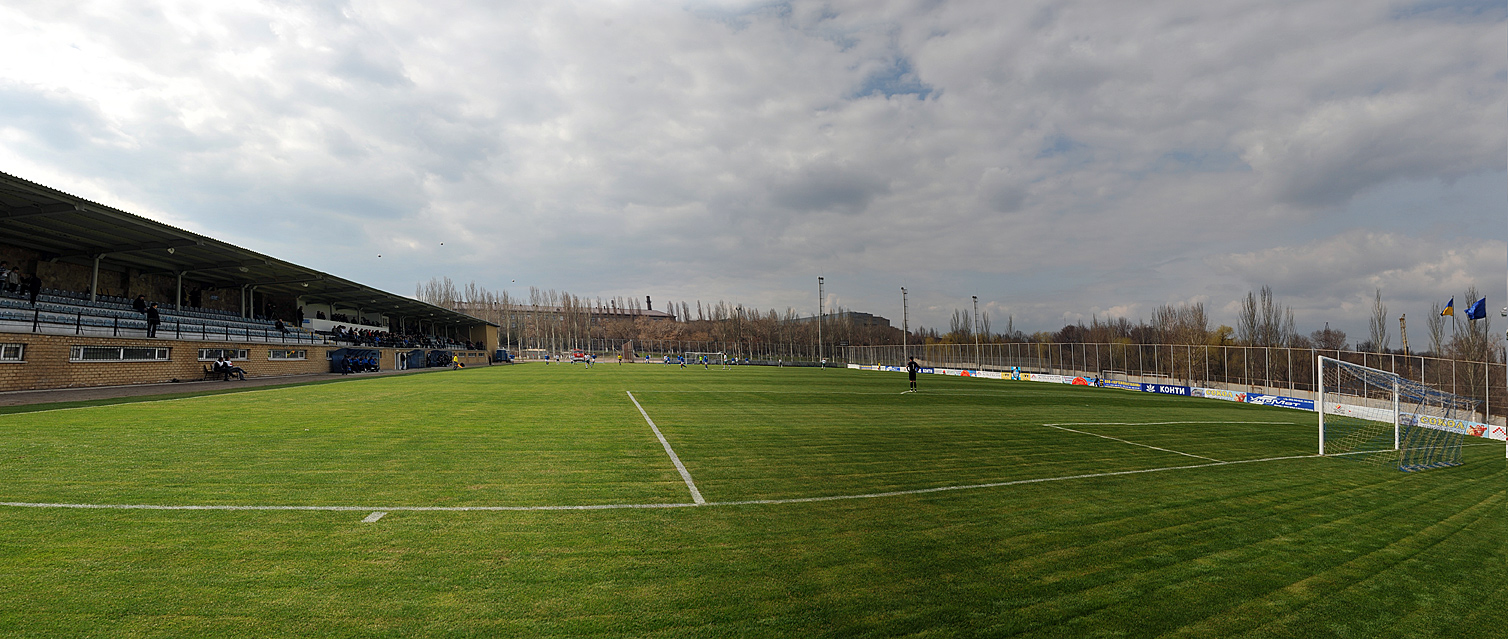
- Interactive map of Sports Complex Olimpik
- Location: Lenin district, Donetsk, Ukraine
- Coordinates: 47°57′41.07″N 37°48′28.76″E
- Owner: Regional fund of football development
- Operator: Olimpik Donetsk
- Capacity: 3,000
- Surface: Grass
- Field size: 105 m × 68 m (115 yd × 74 yd)

Construction
- Opened: 2001
- Expanded: 2014

Tenant
- Olimpik Donetsk

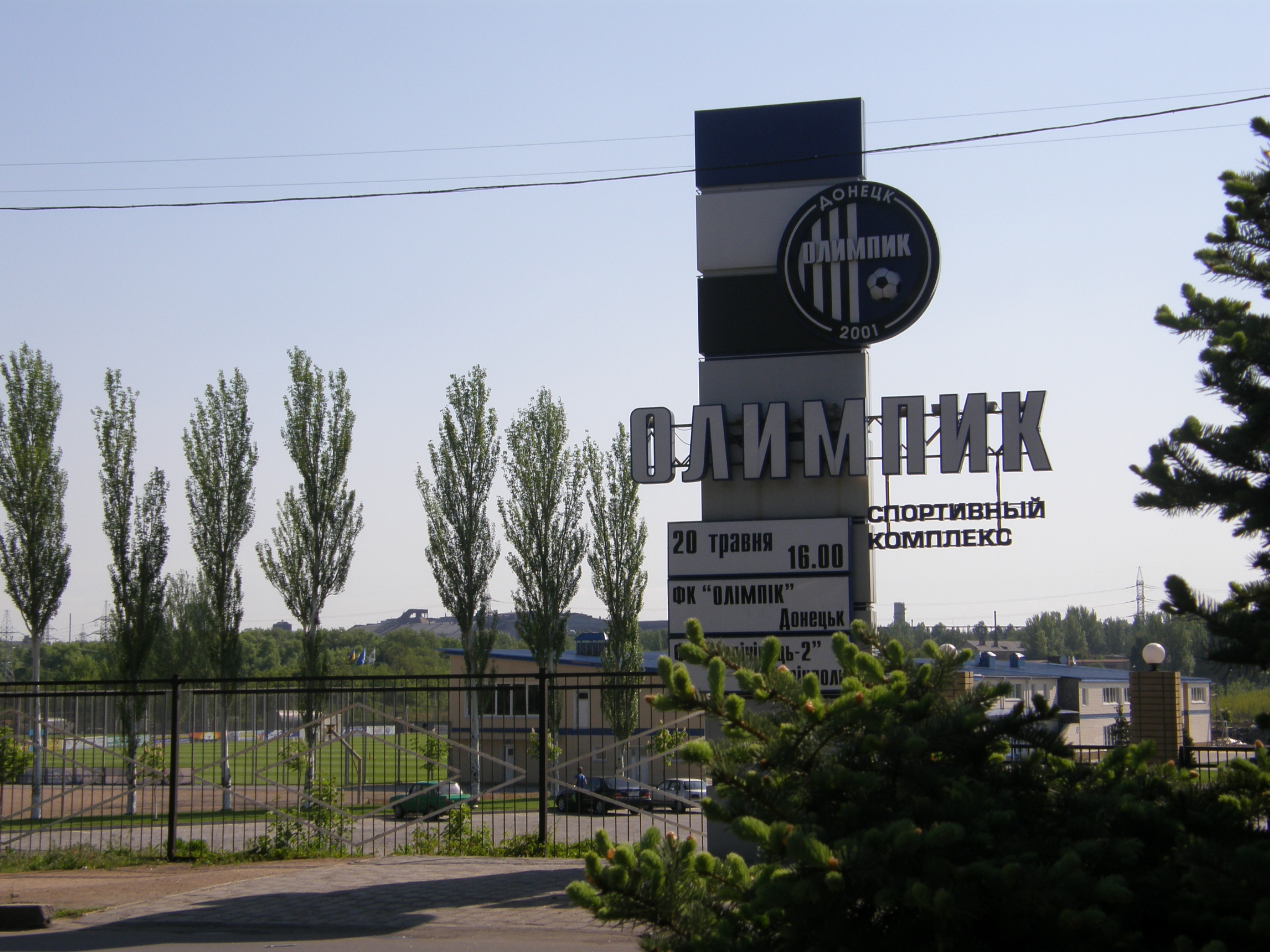
Stele at the entrance to the complex

Sports Complex Olimpik (Ukrainian: Спортивний комплекс «Олімпік») is a football stadium in the city of Donetsk, Ukraine.

Originally when the complex was built the stadium had seating for 680 spectators. Later in the autumn of 2010 it was expanded to 1000 spectators. Major reconstruction occurred both in 2013 and 2014 with the addition of 2 small stands and currently there is room for 3,000 spectators.

The stadium is located on the territory of 7.4 ha (18 acres) in one of the oldest areas of Donetsk known as Bosse.

Infrastructure sports complex consists of five training fields:

- Two grass pitches – 105 m × 68 m (115 yd × 74 yd)
- Artificial pitch – 105 m × 68 m (115 yd × 74 yd)
- Small artificial pitch – 44 m × 22 m (48 yd × 24 yd)
- Small grass training area – 50 m × 25 m (55 yd × 27 yd)

The stadium facilities include four locker rooms, two coaching rooms, a referees room, a medical center, a media press area seating for 35–40, a gymnasium on the ground floor and separate rooms for players with dining facilities on the second floor. There is also reserved parking at the ground.
