= Parimatch =

Cypriot sports betting company (1994–2023)

- Industry: Betting
- Founded: 1994
- Headquarters: Limassol, Cyprus
- Key people: Sergey Portnov (owner)
- Products: Bookmaking, betting shops, online gambling
- Website: parimatch.com

Parimatch is an online entertainment company with its headquarters located in Limassol, Cyprus.

== History ==
1994 — Parimatch was established in Kyiv, Ukraine. 1998 — The company entered the Russian market. The online betting website was launched in 2000 and Parimatch was one of the first among bookmakers in the CIS region. 2015 — Parimatch entered the Kazakhstan market and began cooperation with Federbet to prevent match-fixing. In 2018, the company began operations in Cyprus, and Africa, including Tanzania. In December 2018, Parimatch's CEO, Sergey Portnov won 'Leader of the year award' at the SBC Awards held in London. In February 2020, the company joined the Esports Integrity Commission to assist with combating cheating and fraud in esports. In 2020, Parimatch launched into the UK market as a franchise, with their website being run by BV Gaming Limited.

In March 2021, Parimatch became the first betting company in Ukraine to obtain a license after a new licensing regulation was adopted by the local parliament. In December 2021, Parimatch acquired the performance marketing organization Mr Fish and the online poker room PokerMatch.

In 2022, following the Russian invasion of Ukraine, Parimatch withdrew the franchise from Russia. In May 2022, Parimatch announced they had organized the Parimatch Foundation and had allocated €510,000 to support the people of Ukraine. The foundation, originally set up for educational and sports projects, has reallocated its resources toward humanitarian aid, as well as securing evacuations and providing financial support for Ukrainian athletes with disabilities, and other means.

In April 2022, Parimatch announced a restructuring of its management, appointing Maksym Liashko as the new CEO of the organization as Roman Syrotian (former CEO) stepped into a supervisory role.

In May 2022, Parimatch continued with the company's plan for international expansion by opening a new European hub in Prague. Additionally, the new office provided a working environment for the company employees from Ukraine. The previous company R&D center was in Kyiv but has been relocated for safety reasons due to military activity around the capital.

In December 2023, Maksym Liashko stepped down as Chief Executive Officer of Parimatch.

In September 2024, Kateryna Biloruska sold her controlling stake in Parimatch Group to Sergey Portnov. Subsequently, Portnov became the sole owner of Parimatch Group after buying out some minority shareholders.

== Other projects ==
Parimatch supports community development initiatives in Cyprus, the country where its head office is based:

- 2025 — Parimatch contributed to a TechIsland fundraising initiative to support wildfire relief and assistance for affected communities.
- Parimatch sponsored the Women in STEM Cyprus Summit 2025.

=== Responsible Gambling ===
In September 2021, the Responsible Gambling platform was launched, which aims to reduce risks for players, in particular, to prevent the development of gambling addiction. Oleksandr Usyk became the ambassador of the campaign.

== Sponsorship, Partnership ==
- 2016 — APOEL FC
- 2018 — Betting partner of UFC in EMEA
- 2020 — Leicester City FC
- 2020 — Juventus FC
- 2020 — Everton FC
- 2021 — Chelsea FC
- 2022 — Newcastle United FC
- 2023 — Botafogo FC
- 2024 — Nottingham Forest FC
- 2024 — Argentine Football Association
- 2024 — Leicester City FC
- 2025 — Leeds United FC
- 2025 — UFC, official Asia partner
- 2025 — Manchester United FC, Partner across Asia and MENA regions
- 2025 — Joburg Super Kings, official principal partner
- 2026 — CSKA Pamir Dushanbe
- 2026 Tajikistan Higher League

=== Brand Ambassadors ===
- 2019 — UFC Champion Conor McGregor
- 2019 — Former boxer Mike Tyson
- 2020 — Bellator Welterweight Champion Yaroslav Amosov
- 2020 — Oleksandr Shovkovskyi became the brand’s football expert
- 2021 — Oleksandr Usyk

== License ==
Parimatch operated under local licenses issued by the regulatory authorities of each country in Cyprus, Kazakhstan, Tajikistan, and Tanzania. The company also carried out its activity under the international license of the self-governing territory Curaçao (eGaming).

On October 1, 2020, Parimatch launched into the UK market with their website being run by BV Gaming Limited.

On March 10, 2023, Parimatch's operations in Ukraine were suspended by the National Security and Defense Council. The sanctions affected all property of the company, including its subsidiary websites and the licensed website PM.UA. As a result of the blocking, approximately 250 million hryvnias of Ukrainian players' funds were frozen in Parimatch's accounts. The company challenged the sanctions in court.
