= Dmytro Andriyev =

Ukrainian water polo player (born 1970)

Personal information
- Nationality: Ukrainian
- Born: 18 September 1970 (age 54)

Sport
- Sport: Water polo

Dmytro Andriyev (born 18 September 1970) is a Ukrainian water polo player. He competed in the men's tournament at the 1996 Summer Olympics.
