= Sergey Portnov =

Ukrainian entrepreneur

- Портнов Сергій Юрійович
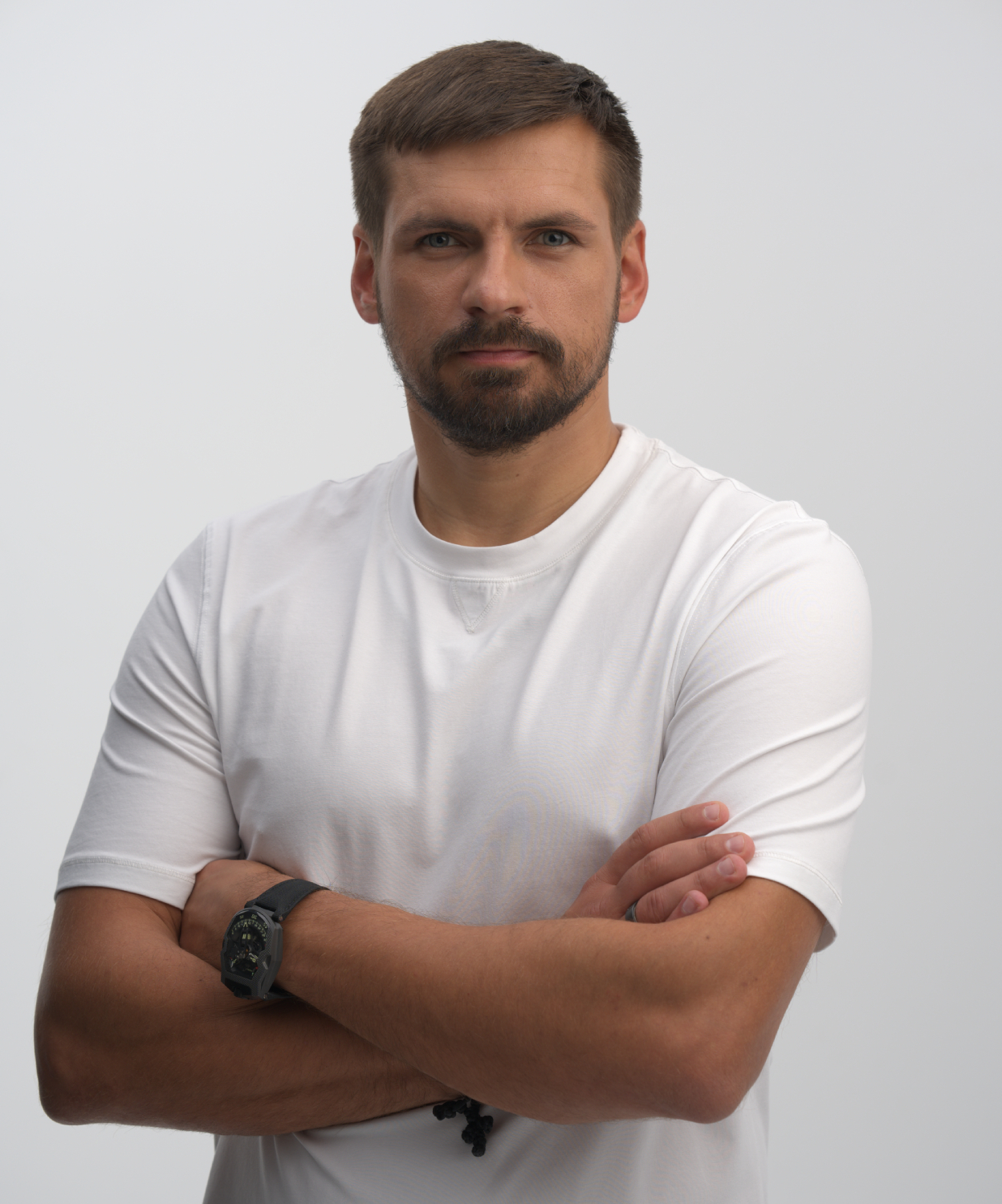
- Portnov in 2025
- Born: Kyiv
- Other name: Serhiy Portnov
- Citizenship: Cyprus
- Education: University of Salford; Cass Business School
- Occupation: entrepreneur
- Years active: 2011–present
- Organization: SP Ventures
- Awards: "Leader of the Year" (SBC Awards, 2018, 2020); "CEO of the year" (Global Regulatory Awards, 2020)

Sergey Portnov (Serhiy Portnov, Ukrainian: Портнов Сергій Юрійович) is a Ukrainian entrepreneur and owner of "SP Ventures".

== Biography ==
Portnov was born and raised in Kyiv, Ukraine. He studied in the UK, where he earned a bachelor's degree in gaming business and leisure management from the University of Salford, and also graduated from Cass Business School in London with a degree in management.

After completing his studies, Portnov returned to Ukraine, becoming marketing director at Parimatch in 2011 and taking over as CEO in 2013. In his role as CEO, Portnov implemented significant changes, transforming the company from an offline bookmaker into an online platform. Portnov focused on digital technologies, and under his leadership, business processes were restructured, and the company's research department grew from 5 to 200 employees over several years.

In 2018, the number of registered users on Parimatch grew by almost 25%, and the daily betting volume increased by 40%. Portnov also changed his approach to advertising, and the company ran several advertising campaigns featuring famous athletes. In 2019, UFC champion Conor McGregor and former boxer Mike Tyson became brand ambassadors, followed by Oleksandr Usyk in 2021. Portnov also began to enter into international partnerships, became a sponsor of several sports teams and federations, and signed a partnership agreement with the UFC. Company partners list include Leicester City, Juventus, Everton, Chelsea, Manchester United, Leeds United (2025), and others. Under Portnov's leadership, the company began to develop its esports division, joined the Esports Integrity Commission in February 2020, and became a sponsor of several teams, including Fnatic.

In 2021, Portnov left his position as CEO, becoming a co-owner of the company and chairman of its supervisory board. In 2022, Parimatch announced its withdrawal from the Russian market, revoked all licenses, and refused to use its trademark in this territory. Despite this, in March 2023, the company became the only Ukrainian company to be sanctioned by the National Security and Defense Council of Ukraine along with a number of Russian companies. Parimatch claimed that the revocation of its license to operate in Ukraine was unlawful and challenged this decision in court, citing the conclusion of the law firm Mayer Brown (USA), which confirmed that the company had no ties to business in the Russian Federation.

In September 2024, Portnov acquired a controlling stake in Parimatch Group from co-owner Kateryna Biloruska, after which he became the sole owner of the company. By the end of 2024, Portnov had also bought out the shares of minority shareholders, finally consolidating Parimatch under his leadership. In September 2026, he stepped back from operational management.

== Other activities ==
In 2021–2022, Portnov temporarily stepped away from managing Parimatch to focus on educational projects, becoming a co-owner of Trinity School in Cyprus, which operates under the International Baccalaureate program and has been awarding corresponding diplomas since 2025. The school implements the Primary Years Programme for elementary school (students aged 3–12) and the Middle Years Programme for middle school (11–16) and is designed for 500 students.

In September 2026, he launched SP Ventures.

== Awards ==
- "Leader of the Year" according to SBC Awards, London (2018)
- "Leader of the Year" according to SBC Awards (2020)
- "CEO of the year" according to Global Regulatory Awards (2020)

== Personal life ==
Portnov lives in Cyprus and is a citizen of that country. He is married and has a daughter. He is a professional poker player and practices Thai boxing. He has close ties with Dana White and Conor McGregor.
