= Kostyantyn Frolov =

Ukrainian footballer and coach

Personal information
- Full name: Kostyantyn Viktorovych Frolov
- Date of birth: 20 June 1972 (age 54)
- Place of birth: Odesa, Ukrainian SSR
- Height: 1.77 m (5 ft 10 in)
- Position: Defender

Team information
- Current team: Kryvbas Kryvyi Rih

Youth career
- SKA Odesa

Senior career*
Years	Team	Apps	(Gls)
1993–1997	Dynamo Odesa	46	(1)

Managerial career
- 1997–2005: FC Spartak Odesa (assistant)
- 2005–2006: Chornomorets Odesa (assistant)
- 2007: Chornomorets-2 Odesa (assistant)
- 2008–2010: Chornomorets Odesa (assistant)
- 2012–2014: Kazakhstan U-17
- 2014–2015: Shukura Kobuleti
- 2015–2017: Chornomorets Odesa youth school (director of sport)
- 2017: Dinamo Batumi
- 2017: Chornomorets Odesa U-21
- 2017–2018: Chornomorets Odesa
- 2018–2020: Hirnyk Kryvyi Rih (director of youth development)
- 2021: Kryvbas Kryvyi Rih (sporting director)
- 2021–2022: Lyubomyr Stavyshche (director of development)
- 2022–2023: Kryvbas Kryvyi Rih (assistant)
- 2023–: Kryvbas Kryvyi Rih
- * Club domestic league appearances and goals

Kostyantyn Frolov (Ukrainian: Костянтин Вікторович Фролов; born 20 June 1972) is a retired Ukrainian football defender and current manager of Kryvbas Kryvyi Rih.

== Career ==
Frolov is a product of SKA Odesa youth sportive school system. His first trainers was Serhiy Krulykovskyi.

After the short football playing career in FC Dynamo Odesa, he retired from football and subsequently graduated Agricultural Institute and Pedagogical Institute. In the same time he began a coaching career. In December 2017 he was appointed a manager of FC Chornomorets Odesa in the Ukrainian Premier League.
