= Dario Drudi =

Argentine football manager

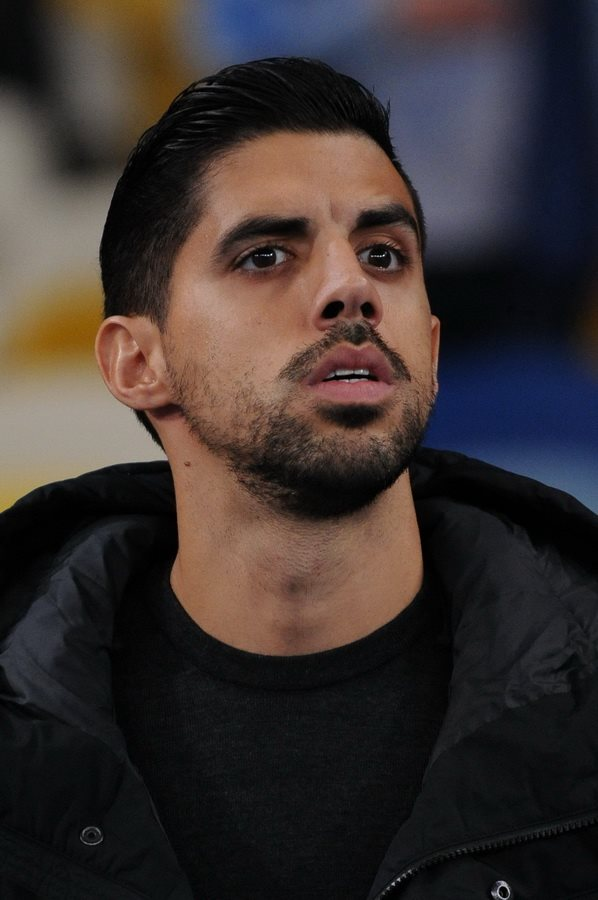

Personal information
- Full name: Dario Hernan Drudi
- Date of birth: 23 April 1987 (age 39)
- Place of birth: Buenos Aires, Argentina

Youth career
- Years: Team
- 2003–2007: Gandía

Managerial career
- 2007–2009: Gandía (children team's ass't)
- 2009–2010: Gandía (youth team under-19)
- 2010–2011: Villarreal C (assistant)
- 2011–2016: Villarreal (assistant)
- 2016: Zirka Kropyvnytskyi (youth team)
- 2016: Zirka Kropyvnytskyi (caretaker)
- 2017: Monaco (staff)
- 2017–2018: Karpaty Lviv (executive director)
- 2017: Karpaty Lviv (caretaker)
- 2017–2018: Karpaty Lviv (assistant)
- 2019: Pyramids (assistant)

Dario Hernan Drudi (born 23 April 1987) is an Argentine football manager.

== Career ==
Drudi lived in Spain from age 15 and the next year joined the youth team of CF Gandía. But later he decided to concentrate on a coaching career. He started his managing career in Villarreal sportive school as an assistant coach, working here from 2011 until June 2016. He was part of the manager Marcelino García Toral team.

In July 2016, he signed a contract with the Ukrainian Premier League's FC Zirka Kropyvnytskyi and worked as manager of the youth reserves team. In August 2016, the main coach Serhiy Lavrynenko left Zirka, and on 18 August 2016 Dario Drudi was named as a caretaker manager of the Ukrainian team. He worked in the club until 15 November 2016.

On 2 August 2019 Turki Al-Sheikh became the owner of UD Almería and named Drudi as sporting director, replacing Miguel Ángel Corona,
