= Roman Sanzhar =

Ukrainian footballer and coach

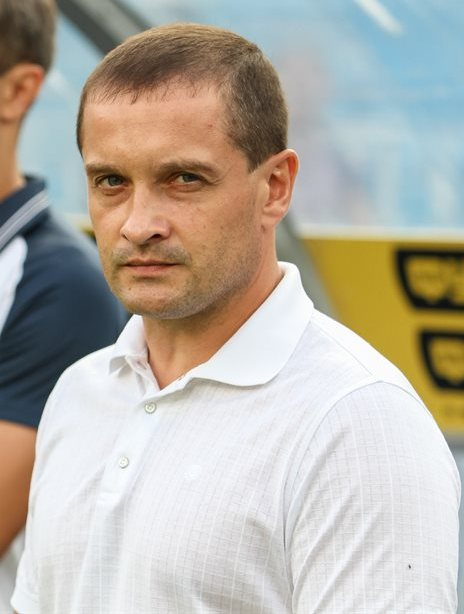

Personal information
- Full name: Roman Mykolayovych Sanzhar
- Date of birth: 28 May 1979 (age 47)
- Place of birth: Donetsk, Ukrainian SSR
- Height: 1.66 m (5 ft 5 1/2 in)
- Position: Midfielder

Youth career
- Shakhtar Donetsk

Senior career*
Years	Team	Apps	(Gls)
1995–1999	Shakhtar-2 Donetsk	127	(10)
2001	Mashynobudivnyk Druzhkivka	3	(1)
2001	Metalurh Donetsk	5	(0)
2001	→Metalurh-2 Donetsk	10	(1)
2002–2003	Kryvbas Kryvyi Rih	40	(1)
2003–2004	Zorya Luhansk	14	(1)
2004–2012	Olimpik Donetsk	225	(9)
Total		424	(23)

Managerial career
- 2012–2013: Olimpik Donetsk (assistant)
- 2013: Olimpik Donetsk (caretaker)
- 2013–2018: Olimpik Donetsk
- 2019–2020: Karpaty Lviv
- 2021: Olimpik Donetsk
- * Club domestic league appearances and goals

Roman Sanzhar (Ukrainian: Роман Миколайович Санжар; born 28 May 1979) is a Ukrainian former professional footballer who played as a midfielder and current Ukrainian coach.

== Career ==
In December 2012, Sanzhar announced his retirement and became the assistant coach for the Ukrainian First League club FC Olimpik Donetsk. In 17 April 2013 he was appointed as interim coach to the same club after working during the short time as assistant coach in this club. He helped the club win the 2013–14 Ukrainian First League and win promotion to the Ukrainian Premier League.
