= Roman Monaryov =

Ukrainian footballer and manager

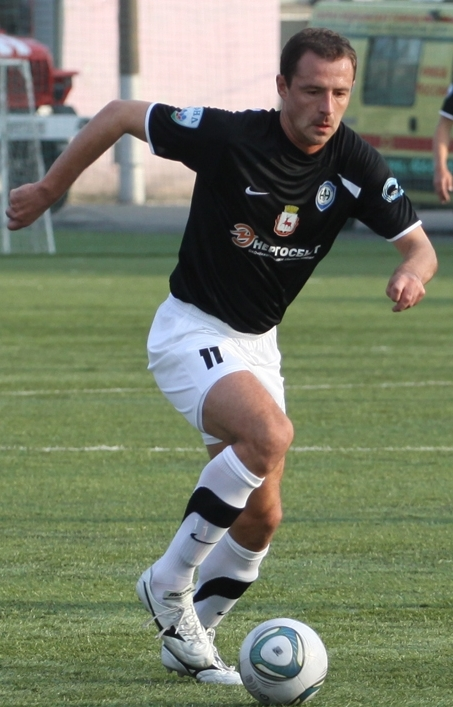

Personal information
- Full name: Roman Hennadiovych Monaryov
- Date of birth: 17 January 1980 (age 46)
- Place of birth: Kirovohrad, Ukrainian SSR
- Height: 1.86 m (6 ft 1 in)
- Position: Striker

Senior career*
Years	Team	Apps	(Gls)
1996	FC Sotel Kirovohrad	1	(0)
1997–1998	Zirka Kirovohrad	4	(0)
1997–1998	→ Zirka-2 Kirovohrad	23	(5)
1998	Alania Vladikavkaz	4	(0)
1999	Kryvbas Kryvyi Rih	21	(9)
1999	→ Kryvbas-2 Kryvyi Rih	8	(3)
2000–2001	CSKA Kyiv	24	(3)
2000–2001	→ CSKA-2 Kyiv	17	(1)
2001–2003	CSKA Moscow	21	(1)
2003	→ Torpedo-Metallurg Moscow (loan)	30	(8)
2004	Arsenal Kyiv	12	(1)
2004	Zhenis Astana	15	(4)
2005–2006	KAMAZ Naberezhnye Chelny	46	(18)
2006	Luch-Energiya Vladivostok	17	(2)
2007–2010	Shinnik Yaroslavl	111	(28)
2010–2011	Nizhny Novgorod	39	(7)
2012	Chernomorets Novorossiysk	5	(0)
Total		398	(90)

International career
2001	Ukraine-21	4	(3)

Managerial career
- 2016–2017: Zirka Kropyvnytskyi (caretaker)
- 2017–2018: Zirka Kropyvnytskyi
- 2019: Atyrau (assistant coach)
- 2021–2025: Pyunik (assistant coach)
- 2025–: Armenia (assistant coach)
- * Club domestic league appearances and goals

Roman Hennadiovych Monaryov (Ukrainian: Роман Геннадiйoвич Монарьов; Russian: Роман Геннадьевич Монарёв; born 17 January 1980) is a Ukrainian retired footballer and current manager.

== Career ==
Monaryov grew up in his hometown Kropyvnytskyi, where he started playing football in force of his father early.

Since 2017 Monaryov manages the squad of FC Zirka Kropyvnytskyi, with them he managed to stay in the league after the end of the season 2016/17.

== Honours ==
- Russian Cup winner: 2002.
- Russian Premier League runner-up: 2002.
- Ukrainian Premier League bronze: 1999.
