= Serhiy Zaytsev =

Ukrainian footballer

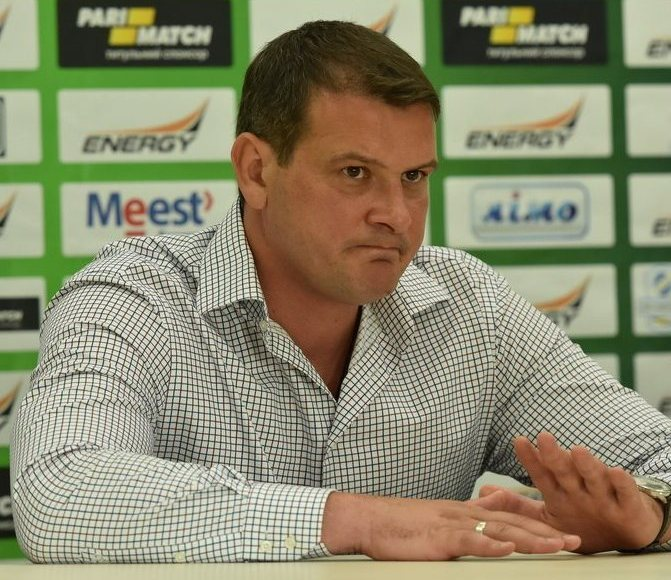
- Zaytsev in 2016

Personal information
- Full name: Serhiy Ilarionovych Zaytsev
- Date of birth: 13 April 1974 (age 52)
- Place of birth: Zaporizhzhia, Ukrainian SSR
- Height: 1.90 m (6 ft 3 in)
- Position: Defender

Youth career
- Metalurh Zaporizhzhia

Senior career*
Years	Team	Apps	(Gls)
1991	Mayak Kharkiv	29	(1)
1992	Torpedo Zaporizhzhia	8	(0)
1993–1994	Metalurh Zaporizhzhia	22	(0)
1994–1995	Metalist Kharkiv	42	(0)
1996	Neftekhimik Nizhnekamsk	6	(0)
1998	Ozeta Dukla Trenčín		
1999	WKS Wieluń		
1999	Pogoń Szczecin	1	(0)
1999	Dinamo Sevastopol		
2001	Ozeta Dukla Trenčín		
2002	Tatran Prešov		
2003	Košice		
2004–2005	Atyrau		
2005	Energetik Pavlodar		
2006	Kaisar	12	(1)
2006–2007	Atyrau	15	(2)
2008	Ros Bila Tserkva	20	(0)

Managerial career
- 2007–2008: Atyrau (assistant)
- 2008: Ros Bila Tserkva (assistant)
- 2010–2011: Metalurh Zaporizhzhia (assistant)
- 2011–2012: Metalurh Zaporizhzhia (caretaker)
- 2012–2013: Metalurh Zaporizhzhia (youth)
- 2013: Metalurh Zaporizhzhia
- 2015: Zaria Bălți
- 2016: Karpaty Lviv (caretaker)
- 2016–2017: Karpaty Lviv (sporting director)
- 2017: Karpaty Lviv
- 2018–2019: Akzhayik
- 2019: Legionovia Legionowo
- * Club domestic league appearances and goals

Serhiy Ilarionovych Zaytsev (Ukrainian: Сергій Іларіонович Зайцев; born 13 April 1974) is a Ukrainian football manager and former player who played as a defender.

== Career ==
Zaytsev is product of youth team sistem Metalurh Zaporizhzhia. His first coach was Volodymyr Kocheharov. Zaytsev had a brief spell with Pogoń Szczecin during 1999, appearing as a substitute in one Ekstraklasa match.
