= Oleg Dulub =

Belarusian footballer (born 1965)

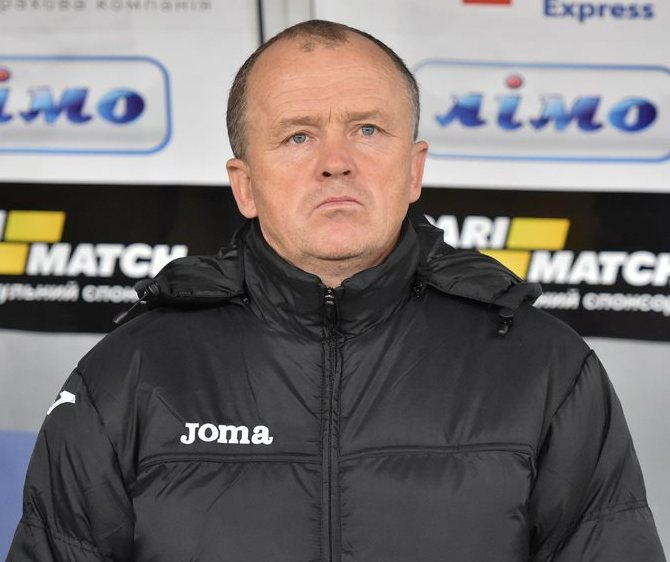

Personal information
- Date of birth: 20 September 1965 (age 61)
- Place of birth: Minsk, Belarusian SSR, Soviet Union
- Height: 1.80 m (5 ft 11 in)
- Position: Midfielder

Senior career*
Years	Team	Apps	(Gls)
1983–1987	SKIF Minsk		
1988	Traktor Bobruisk		
1989	Pripyat Pinsk		
1989	KIM Vitebsk	8	(0)
1990	Belarus Maryina Gorka		
1991–1992	Gomselmash Gomel	55	(3)
1992	Shakhtyor Soligorsk	14	(0)
1993–1994	Molodechno	35	(6)
1994	Samotlor-XXI Nizhnevartovsk	22	(2)
1994–1995	Synot Staré Město		
1995–1996	Vairogs Rēzekne	43	(19)
1996	Dinaburg Daugavpils	9	(2)
1997	Dalian Wanda	1	(0)
1997	Rēzekne	10	(2)
1998	KPV Kokkola	18	(4)
1999	KPT-85 Kemi	7	(2)
1999–2001	TP-47 Tornio	32	(24)
2001	SKAF Minsk	14	(1)
2003	Livadiya Dzerzhinsk	20	(4)
Total		288	(69)

Managerial career
- 2002–2003: Livadiya Dzerzhinsk
- 2004: Darida Minsk Raion (assistant)
- 2005–2006: Smena Minsk (assistant)
- 2007–2009: Torpedo Zhodino (assistant)
- 2010: Minsk (assistant)
- 2011: Vitebsk (assistant)
- 2012: Gomel (assistant)
- 2013: Neman Grodno (assistant)
- 2013–2014: Dinamo Minsk (assistant)
- 2015–2016: Krumkachy Minsk
- 2016–2017: Karpaty Lviv
- 2017: Chornomorets Odesa
- 2018: BATE Borisov
- 2019: Belarus U19
- 2019: Atyrau
- 2021: Krumkachy Minsk
- 2021–2023: Lviv
- 2023–2024: LNZ Cherkasy
- 2026: Nyva Ternopil
- * Club domestic league appearances and goals

Oleg Dulub or Aleh Dulub (Belarusian: Алег Анатольевіч Дулуб; Russian: Олег Анатольевич Дулуб; born 20 September 1965) is a Belarusian professional football coach and a former player.

== Managerial career ==
From 7 October 2016 until 11 June 2017, Dulub worked as a manager at Karpaty Lviv.

From 4 September until 22 December 2017, he worked as a manager at Chornomorets Odesa.

On 6 September 2021, Dulub took over FC Lviv from the Ukrainian Premier League.

On 13 January 2026, he headed Nyva Ternopil. On 11 May 2026, Dulub left the club.
