= Oleksandr Babych =

Ukrainian footballer and manager

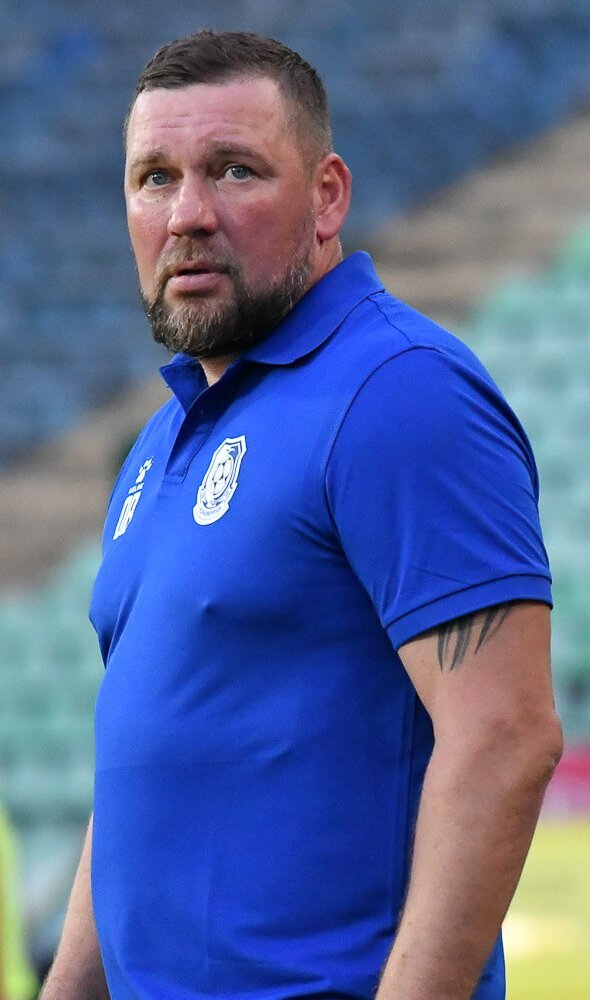
- Babych in 2024

Personal information
- Full name: Oleksandr Oleksandrovych Babych
- Date of birth: 15 February 1979 (age 47)
- Place of birth: Alchevsk, Soviet Union (now Ukraine)
- Height: 1.86 m (6 ft 1 in)
- Position: Defender

Youth career
- Dnipro Dnipropetrovsk

Senior career*
| Years | Team | Apps | (Gls) |
| 1997 | Kremin Kremenchuk | 10 | (0) |
| 1997 | → Hirnyk Sport Komsomolsk (loan) | 2 | (0) |
| 1998–2001 | Dnipro Dnipropetrovsk | 8 | (0) |
| 1998–2001 | → Dnipro-2 Dnipropetrovsk | 70 | (1) |
| 2000–2001 | → Dnipro-3 Dnipropetrovsk | 10 | (0) |
| 2001–2002 | Polihraftekhnika Oleksandriya | 22 | (5) |
| 2002–2005 | Anzhi Makhachkala | 82 | (5) |
| 2005–2008 | Metalist Kharkiv | 67 | (6) |
| 2009–2011 | Chornomorets Odesa | 31 | (4) |
| Total | | 302 | (21) |

Managerial career
- 2012–2014: Chornomorets Odesa (youth)
- 2014–2017: Chornomorets Odesa (caretaker)
- 2017: Chornomorets Odesa
- 2017–2020: Mariupol
- 2021–2022: Kryvbas Kryvyi Rih
- 2022–2024: Fratria
- 2024: Pirin Blagoevgrad
- 2024–2025: Chornomorets Odesa
- 2025: Vorskla Poltava
- * Club domestic league appearances and goals

Oleksandr Oleksandrovych Babych (Ukrainian: Олександр Олександрович Бабич; born 15 February 1979) is a Ukrainian professional football manager and former player.

== Playing career ==
=== Early years ===
Oleksandr Babych is a product of the Dnipro Dnipropetrovsk Youth system.

=== Hirnyk-Sport Komsomolsk and Kremin Kremenchuk ===
After playing for Dnipro-2 in 1997, he left to play for Hirnyk-Sport Komsomolsk and Kremin Kremenchuk during the 1997–98 season.

=== Dnipro Dnipropetrovsk ===
From 1998 to 2001, Babych stayed again with Dnipro Dnipropetrovsk. He spent most of his playing time with the reserve teams Dnipro-2 and Dnipro-3; he did, however, play in a few games for the senior team.

=== Polihraftekhnika Oleksandriya ===
He was transferred to Polihraftekhnika Oleksandriya for the 2001–02 season. Babych scored the only goal in the relegation play-off game against Polissya Zhytomyr that allowed the Oleksandriya team to stay in the top tier.

=== Anzhi Makhachkala ===
He was then spotted by the Russian Premier League side Anzhi Makhachkala and was transferred to the club in 2003, playing there until 2005.

=== Metalist Kharkiv ===
His next stop was Metalist Kharkiv. At Metalist, he soon became the vice-captain and played a vital role in the team's defence.

=== Chornomorets Odesa ===
In February 2009, he moved to Chornomorets Odesa, where he was chosen captain on 15 July 2010, prior to the start of the 2010–11 season. The subsequent two seasons of his career were, however, marred by injuries, and Babych had to retire as a player on 2 March 2012.

== Managerial career ==
He immediately became the manager of the Chornomorets youth squad, though.

In the summer of 2022 Babych moved to Constantsa, Romania after the Russian invasion of Ukraine, where he met Viktor Bakurevic, owner of a newly established team Fratria, with the help of Oleksandr Lavrentsov and become manager of the team, despite the fact the team was in A Regional Varna, which is the 4th level of Bulgarian football. On 5 February 2024 Babych took over Bulgarian First League club Pirin Blagoevgrad.

At the beginning of July 2024 Babych became the head coach of the FC Chornomorets Odesa. On March 23, 2025 FC Chornomorets has announced, the head coach Oleksandr Babych has been fired. Shortly afterwards it was announced that Babych was appointed as managing director of sport for Chornomorets Odesa.

On July 12, 2025, it became known that Vorskla Poltava decided to appoint Oleksandr Babych as the new head coach of the first team. He was sacked by the club on 10 October 2025.

== Personal life ==
Babych is currently married to Natalia and has a daughter named Violetta.
