= 2018–19 in Ukrainian football =

Football in Ukraine
- Season: 2018-19

Men's football
- Premier League: Shakhtar Donetsk
- League 1: SC Dnipro-1
- League 2: FC Mynai (Group A); Kremin Kremenchuk (Group B)
- Amateur League: VPK-Ahro Shevchenkivka
- Cup: Shakhtar Donetsk
- Amateur Cup: Avanhard Bziv
- Super Cup: Dynamo Kyiv

Women's football
- League High: Zhytlobud-1 Kharkiv
- League 1: EMS Podillia Vinnytsia (Group A); WFC Mariupol (Group B)
- Women's Cup: Zhytlobud-1 Kharkiv

The 2018–19 season was the 28th season of competitive association football in Ukraine since dissolution of the Soviet Union.

== UEFA competitions ==
=== UEFA Champions League ===
==== Qualifying phase and play-off round ====
===== Third qualifying round =====
Team 1	Agg.	Team 2	1st leg	2nd leg
Slavia Prague (Czech Republic)	1–3	(Ukraine) Dynamo Kyiv	1–1	0–2

===== Play-off round =====
Team 1	Agg.	Team 2	1st leg	2nd leg
Ajax (Netherlands)	3–1	(Ukraine) Dynamo Kyiv	3–1	0–0

==== Group stage ====
===== Group F =====
Pos	Team	Pld	W	D	L	GF	GA	GD	Pts	Qualification	MCI	LYO	SHK	HOF
1	(England) Manchester City	6	4	1	1	16	6	+10	13	Advance to knockout phase	—	1–2	6–0	2–1
2	(France) Lyon	6	1	5	0	12	11	+1	8	Advance to knockout phase	2–2	—	2–2	2–2
3	(Ukraine) Shakhtar Donetsk	6	1	3	2	8	16	−8	6	Transfer to Europa League	0–3	1–1	—	2–2
4	(Germany) TSG Hoffenheim	6	0	3	3	11	14	−3	3		1–2	3–3	2–3	—

Source: UEFA

=== UEFA Europa League ===
==== Qualifying phase and play-off round ====
===== Second qualifying round =====
Team 1	Agg.	Team 2	1st leg	2nd leg
Djurgårdens IF (Sweden)	2–3	(Ukraine) Mariupol	1–1	1–2 (a.e.t.)

===== Third qualifying round =====
Team 1	Agg.	Team 2	1st leg	2nd leg
Zorya Luhansk (Ukraine)	3–3 (a)	(Portugal) Braga	1–1	2–2
Mariupol (Ukraine)	2–5	(France) Bordeaux	1–3	1–2

===== Play-off round =====
Team 1	Agg.	Team 2	1st leg	2nd leg
Zorya Luhansk (Ukraine)	2–3	(Germany) RB Leipzig	0–0	2–3

==== Group stage ====
===== Group E =====
Pos	Team	Pld	W	D	L	GF	GA	GD	Pts	Qualification	ARS	SPO	VOR	QRB
1	(England) Arsenal	6	5	1	0	12	2	+10	16	Advance to knockout phase	—	0–0	4–2	1–0
2	(Portugal) Sporting CP	6	4	1	1	13	3	+10	13	Advance to knockout phase	0–1	—	3–0	2–0
3	(Ukraine) Vorskla Poltava	6	1	0	5	4	13	−9	3 (Note: Goal difference in all group matches: Vorskla Poltava –9, Qarabağ –11.)		0–3	1–2	—	0–1
4	(Azerbaijan) Qarabağ	6	1	0	5	2	13	−11	3		0–3	1–6	0–1	—

Source: UEFA

===== Group K =====
Pos	Team	Pld	W	D	L	GF	GA	GD	Pts	Qualification	DKV	REN	AST	JAB
1	(Ukraine) Dynamo Kyiv	6	3	2	1	10	7	+3	11	Advance to knockout phase	—	3–1	2–2	0–1
2	(France) Rennes	6	3	0	3	7	8	−1	9	Advance to knockout phase	1–2	—	2–0	2–1
3	(Kazakhstan) Astana	6	2	2	2	7	7	0	8		0–1	2–0	—	2–1
4	(Czech Republic) Jablonec	6	1	2	3	6	8	−2	5		2–2	0–1	1–1	—

Source: UEFA

==== Knockout phase ====
===== Round of 32 =====
Team 1	Agg.	Team 2	1st leg	2nd leg
Shakhtar Donetsk (Ukraine)	3–6	(Germany) Eintracht Frankfurt	2–2	1–4
Olympiacos (Greece)	2–3	(Ukraine) Dynamo Kyiv	2–2	0–1

===== Round of 16 =====
Team 1	Agg.	Team 2	1st leg	2nd leg
Chelsea (England)	8–0	(Ukraine) Dynamo Kyiv	3–0	5–0

=== UEFA Youth League ===
==== UEFA Champions League Path ====
===== Group F =====
Pos	Team	Pld	W	D	L	GF	GA	GD	Pts	Qualification	HOF	LYO	MCI	SHK
1	(Germany) TSG Hoffenheim	6	3	2	1	15	10	+5	11	Round of 16	—	3–1	5–2	1–1
2	(France) Lyon	6	3	2	1	13	8	+5	11	Play-offs	3–3	—	2–0	2–0
3	(England) Manchester City	6	2	1	3	10	14	−4	7		2–1	1–4	—	4–1
4	(Ukraine) Shakhtar Donetsk	6	0	3	3	5	11	−6	3		1–2	1–1	1–1	—

Source: UEFA
Rules for classification: Group stage tiebreakers

== Men's club football ==
League		Promoted to league	Relegated from league
Premier League		Arsenal–Kyiv; Desna Chernihiv; FC Lviv (from League 2)	Zirka Kropyvnytskyi; Veres Rivne (to League 2); ~~Stal Kamianske~~
League One		Ahrobiznes Volochysk; Prykarpattia Ivano-Frankivsk; SC Dnipro-1; Metalist 1925 Kharkiv	Kremin Kremenchuk; Cherkaskyi Dnipro; ~~Naftovyk-Ukrnafta Okhtyrka~~; ~~Zhemchuzhyna Odesa~~
League Two	Groups		
League Two	A	FC Mynai; FC Kalush; Chaika Petropavlivska Borshchahivka	~~Skala Stryi~~; ~~Arsenal-Kyivshchyna Bila Tserkva~~; ~~FC Ternopil~~
League Two	B	Krystal Kherson; Metalurh Zaporizhzhia; Hirnyk Kryvyi Rih	FC Dnipro; ~~Inhulets-2 Petrove~~; ~~Sudnobudivnyk Mykolaiv~~; ~~Metalurh Zaporizhzhia~~

Note: For all scratched clubs, see section Clubs removed for more details

=== Premier League ===
Pos	Team	Pld	W	D	L	GF	GA	GD	Pts	Qualification or relegation (Note: Teams play each other twice (22 matches), before the league split into two groups (the top six and the bottom six) for the last 10 matches.)
1	Shakhtar Donetsk	22	18	3	1	52	9	+43	57	Qualification for the Championship round
2	Dynamo Kyiv	22	16	2	4	40	11	+29	50	Qualification for the Championship round
3	FC Oleksandriya	22	12	5	5	31	19	+12	41	Qualification for the Championship round
4	Zorya Luhansk	22	8	8	6	28	20	+8	32	Qualification for the Championship round
5	FC Lviv	22	7	9	6	19	20	−1	30	Qualification for the Championship round
6	FC Mariupol	22	8	6	8	24	33	−9	30	Qualification for the Championship round
7	Vorskla Poltava	22	9	2	11	18	28	−10	29	Qualification for the Relegation round
8	Desna Chernihiv	22	8	4	10	23	24	−1	28	Qualification for the Relegation round
9	Karpaty Lviv	22	5	6	11	26	37	−11	21	Qualification for the Relegation round
10	Olimpik Donetsk	22	4	8	10	25	33	−8	20	Qualification for the Relegation round
11	Chornomorets Odesa	22	4	4	14	12	34	−22	16	Qualification for the Relegation round
12	Arsenal Kyiv	22	3	3	16	12	42	−30	12	Qualification for the Relegation round

Source: Ukrainian Premier League Soccerway
Rules for classification: 1) Points; 2) Head-to-head points; 3) Head-to-head goal difference; 4) Head-to-head higher number of goals scored; 5) Goal difference; 6) Higher number of goals scored; 7) Draw or "golden match" if tied for title (Article 22, paragraph 3).
Notes:

Pos	Team	Pld	W	D	L	GF	GA	GD	Pts	Qualification or relegation
1	Shakhtar Donetsk (C)	32	26	5	1	73	11	+62	83	Qualification for the Champions League group stage
2	Dynamo Kyiv	32	22	6	4	54	18	+36	72	Qualification for the Champions League third qualifying round
3	FC Oleksandriya	32	14	7	11	39	34	+5	49	Qualification for the Europa League group stage (Note: Since the winners of the 2018–19 Ukrainian Cup, Shakhtar Donetsk, qualified for European competition based on league position, the spot awarded to the cup winners (Europa League group stage) was passed to the third-placed team, the spot awarded to the third-placed team (Europa League third qualifying round) was passed to the fourth-placed team, and the spot awarded to the fourth-placed team (Europa League second qualifying round) was passed to the fifth-placed team.)
4	FC Mariupol	32	12	7	13	36	47	−11	43 (Note: Head to Head: Mariupol – Zorya +3=0-1, advantage Mariupol.)	Qualification for the Europa League third qualifying round
5	Zorya Luhansk	32	11	10	11	39	34	+5	43	Qualification for the Europa League second qualifying round
6	FC Lviv	32	8	10	14	25	40	−15	34	

Source: Ukrainian Premier League (in Ukrainian), UEFA, Soccerway
Rules for classification: 1) Points; 2) Head-to-head points; 3) Head-to-head goal difference; 4) Head-to-head higher number of goals scored; 5) Goal difference; 6) Higher number of goals scored; 7) Draw or "golden match" if tied for title (Article 22, paragraph 3).
(C) Champions
Notes:

Pos	Team	Pld	W	D	L	GF	GA	GD	Pts	Qualification or relegation
7	Vorskla Poltava	32	12	6	14	31	43	−12	42	
8	Desna Chernihiv	32	12	5	15	35	41	−6	41	
9	Olimpik Donetsk	32	7	13	12	41	48	−7	34	
10	Karpaty Lviv (O)	32	8	9	15	44	53	−9	33	Qualification for the Relegation play-offs
11	Chornomorets Odesa (R)	32	8	7	17	31	49	−18	31	Qualification for the Relegation play-offs
12	Arsenal Kyiv (R, X)	32	7	5	20	26	56	−30	26	Relegated and later withdrawn

Source: Ukrainian Premier League (in Ukrainian), UEFA, Soccerway
Rules for classification: 1) Points; 2) Head-to-head points; 3) Head-to-head goal difference; 4) Head-to-head higher number of goals scored; 5) Goal difference; 6) Higher number of goals scored; 7) Draw or "golden match" if tied for title (Article 22, paragraph 3).
(O) Play-off winners; (R) Relegated; (X) Withdrew

Teams that placed 10th and 11th in the 2018–19 Ukrainian Premier League play two-leg play-off with the second and third teams of the 2018–19 Ukrainian First League. The draw for play-offs took place on 24 May 2019 and the games will be played on 4 and 8 June 2019.

Team 1	Agg.	Team 2	1st leg	2nd leg
Chornomorets Odesa	0 – 2	Kolos Kovalivka	0 – 0	0 – 2
Karpaty Lviv	3 – 1	Volyn Lutsk	0 – 0	3 – 1

=== First leg ===
4 June 2019
19:00 UTC+3

Chornomorets Odesa	0 – 0	Kolos Kovalivka
	Report

Chornomorets Stadium, Odesa
Attendance: 5,435
Referee: Anatoliy Abdula (Kharkiv)

4 June 2019
19:00 UTC+3

Karpaty Lviv	0 – 0	Volyn Lutsk
	Report

Ukraina Stadium, Lviv
Attendance: 10,104
Referee: Denys Shurman (Vyshneve)

=== Second leg ===
8 June 2019
17:00 UTC+3

Kolos Kovalivka	2 – 0	Chornomorets Odesa
Havrysh 57', 63' (pen.)	Report

Kolos Stadium, Kovalivka
Attendance: 2,500
Referee: Vitaliy Romanov

Kolos Kovalivka won 2–0 on aggregate and were promoted to the 2019–20 Ukrainian Premier League. Chornomorets Odesa were relegated to the 2019–20 Ukrainian First League

8 June 2019
19:00 UTC+3

Volyn Lutsk	0 – 3 ~~1 – 3~~	Karpaty Lviv
Kozhanov 42'	Report	Klyots 37'; Ponde 82' (pen.); Miroshnichenko 90+5'

Avanhard Stadium, Lutsk
Attendance: 5,200
Referee: Maksym Kozyryatskyi

Karpaty Lviv won 3–0 on aggregate and retained their spot in the 2019–20 Ukrainian Premier League. Volyn Lutsk remained in the 2019–20 Ukrainian First League

Due to fan violence at the game and attack on referee, the original score 1–3 was scratched and replaced with technical score 0–3 loss to Volyn and win for Karpaty. Additionally, the Lutsk department of police started criminal proceedings on the fact of intentional damage to property during the game by the Karpaty fans.

=== League 1 ===
Pos	Team	Pld	W	D	L	GF	GA	GD	Pts	Promotion, qualification or relegation
1	SC Dnipro-1 (C, P)	28	21	4	3	72	21	+51	67	Promotion to Ukrainian Premier League
2	Kolos Kovalivka (O, P)	28	15	9	4	45	18	+27	54	Qualification to promotion play-offs
3	Volyn Lutsk (Note: Volyn Lutsk was deducted six points according to a decision by FIFA Disciplinary Committee for a debt to a Serbian club FK Rad related to the transfer of Ivan Rogac.)	28	17	7	4	55	30	+25	52	Qualification to promotion play-offs
4	Metalist 1925 Kharkiv	28	15	6	7	35	20	+15	51	
5	Avanhard Kramatorsk	28	14	6	8	44	26	+18	48	
6	Obolon-Brovar Kyiv	28	13	8	7	35	28	+7	47	
7	Inhulets Petrove	28	11	9	8	35	32	+3	42	
8	Balkany Zorya	28	10	8	10	28	31	−3	38	
9	MFC Mykolaiv	28	10	7	11	34	32	+2	37	
10	Prykarpattia Ivano-Frankivsk	28	10	4	14	41	39	+2	34	
11	Rukh Vynnyky	28	8	10	10	35	35	0	34	
12	Hirnyk-Sport Horishni Plavni	28	5	12	11	24	43	−19	27	
13	Ahrobiznes Volochysk (O)	28	3	10	15	17	36	−19	19	Qualification to relegation play-offs
14	PFC Sumy (Note: PFC Sumy received new ownership during winter break in the face of Serhiy Vashchenko who earlier this season was supposed to become the owner of Kobra Kharkiv. The new head coach was announced also former head coach of Kobra, Oleksandr Oliynyk. According to the former club's director Anatoliy Boiko, on 1 December 2018 PFC Sumy did not have any players on contract. On 11 April 2019, the FFU Control and Disciplinary Committee adopted its decision to strip the club of professional status and exclude the club from any competitions that it is participating currently or in the future. However the club has a right to file an appeal. Additional separate sanctions will be also applied against the club's playing and administrative personnel. On 14 April 2019, the chairman of the FFU committee of ethics and fair play Francesco Baranka noted that PFC Sumy has earned some €10 million in match fixing. More to it, Ukrainian coach Oleksandr Sevidov who held post of head coach consultant in PFC Sumy and previously managed FC Illichivets Mariupol received a lifetime disqualification.) (D, R)	28	3	7	18	21	91	−70	16	Qualification to relegation play-offs
15	Zirka Kropyvnytskyi (Note: On 17 February 2019, president of FC Zirka Kropyvnytskyi commented on his club's withdrawal from further participation in competitions of the Ukrainian First League. The president accused the newly formed NABU and law enforcement authorities in pressure against him. The president of the league expressed his surprise claiming that there seemed no real reason why the club had to withdraw. On 5 April 2019, the PFL council of leagues adopted its decision to remove FC Zirka Kropyvnytskyi from the League as it officially withdrew on 14 March 2019. On 22 April 2019, the club's vice-president announced that the club will restart from regional competitions with intention to return the club's pro-status in the future.) (D)	28	1	1	26	10	49	−39	4	Withdrawn
–	Kobra Kharkiv (Note: Kobra Kharkiv (former Helios) after failing to field a team for their Round 4 home match against Hirnyk-Sport Horishni Plavni informed the PFL that they are withdrawing from the competition. The club played three matches in the competition with a record of 3 losses scoring one goals and allowing eight goals scored against them. The PFL annulled their results as per league regulations and removed them from the official standings on the decision of the FFU Control and Disciplinary Committee of 23 August 2018. Note, last year the club competed as FC Helios Kharkiv and was supposed to be merged with another Kharkiv club which continued to compete at amateur level.) (D)	0	–	–	–	–	–	—	0	Results annulled

Updated to match(es) played on 2 June 2019. Source: PFL.ua
Rules for classification: 1) Points; 2) Goal difference; 3) Goals scored; 4) Head-to-head points; 5) Head-to-head goal difference; 6) Head-to-head goals scored; 7) Fair play; 8) Draw or "golden match" (if tied for first).
(C) Champions; (D) Disqualified; (O) Play-off winners; (P) Promoted; (R) Relegated
Notes:

The drawing for relegation playoff took place on 20 May 2019.

Team 1	Agg.	Team 2	1st leg	2nd leg
FC Metalurh Zaporizhya	1–4	FC Ahrobiznes Volochysk	0–4	1–0
PFC Sumy	1–7	FC Cherkashchyna-Akademiya	0–4	1–3

=== First leg ===
29 May 2019
19:00 UTC+3

Metalurh Zaporizhia	0–4	Ahrobiznes Volochysk
	Report	Kurylo 9', 17' (pen.); Slotyuk 45'; Chernenko 86'

Slavutych Arena, Zaporizhia

29 May 2019
13:00 UTC+3

PFC Sumy	0–4	Cherkashchyna-Akademiya
	Report	Medved 58'; Zelenevych 62'; Tymofiyenko 70'; Chorniy 73'

Yuvileiny Stadium, Sumy

=== Second leg ===
2 June 2019
18:00 UTC+3

Ahrobiznes Volochysk	0–1	Metalurh Zaporizhia
	Report	Krapyvnyi 50'

Yunist Stadium, Volochysk
Referee: Dmytro Kryvushkin (Kharkiv)

Ahrobiznes Volochysk won 4–1 on aggregate and has preserved its berth for the 2019–20 Ukrainian First League. Metalurh Zaporizhia has kept its berth for the 2019–20 Ukrainian Second League, but later gained promotion due to withdrawal of Arsenal-Kyiv from professional ranks.

2 June 2019
15:00 UTC+3

Cherkashchyna-Akademiya	3–1	PFC Sumy
Koshadze 3'; Storchous 26'; Boyko 54'	Report	Popov 24'

Zoria Stadium, Bilozirya
Referee: Serhiy Boiko (Kyiv Oblast)

Cherkashchyna-Akademiya won 7–1 on aggregate and was promoted to the 2019–20 Ukrainian First League. PFC Sumy was relegated to the 2019–20 Ukrainian Second League. Later following the PFL Conference PFC Sumy were excluded from professional competitions.

=== League 2 ===
Pos	Team	Pld	W	D	L	GF	GA	GD	Pts	Promotion, qualification or relegation
1	FC Mynai (C, P)	27	15	4	8	41	26	+15	49	Promotion to Ukrainian First League
2	Cherkashchyna-Akademiya Bilozirya (P)	27	14	6	7	43	23	+20	48	Qualification to promotion play-offs
3	Polissya Zhytomyr	27	13	6	8	23	21	+2	45	
4	Nyva Vinnytsia	27	11	9	7	29	23	+6	42	
5	Veres Rivne	27	12	5	10	24	22	+2	41	
6	Nyva Ternopil	27	10	6	11	28	29	−1	36	
7	FC Kalush	27	10	6	11	30	33	−3	36	
8	Chaika Petropavlivska Borshchahivka	27	8	7	12	25	28	−3	31	
9	Podillya Khmelnytskyi	27	6	7	14	20	34	−14	25	
10	Bukovyna Chernivtsi	27	5	6	16	19	43	−24	21	Avoided relegation

Updated to match(es) played on 25 May 2019. Source: PFL.ua
Rules for classification: 1) Points; 2) Goal difference; 3) Goals scored; 4) Head-to-head points; 5) Head-to-head goal difference; 6) Head-to-head goals scored; 7) Fair play; 8) Draw or play-off.
(C) Champions; (P) Promoted

Pos	Team	Pld	W	D	L	GF	GA	GD	Pts	Promotion, qualification or relegation
1	Kremin Kremenchuk (P, C)	27	18	7	2	48	17	+31	61	Promotion to Ukrainian First League
2	Metalurh Zaporizhya (P)	27	18	2	7	54	24	+30	56	Qualification to promotion play-offs
3	Hirnyk Kryvyi Rih	27	15	6	6	53	33	+20	51	
4	Krystal Kherson	27	15	2	10	43	29	+14	47	
5	Myr Hornostayivka	27	14	3	10	41	30	+11	45	Withdrawn after the season
6	Enerhiya Nova Kakhovka	27	8	7	12	26	31	−5	31	
7	Tavriya Simferopol	27	6	12	9	30	35	−5	30	
8	Real Pharma Odesa	27	5	8	14	23	50	−27	23	
9	MFC Mykolaiv-2	27	5	5	17	22	52	−30	20	
10	FC Nikopol	27	3	4	20	15	54	−39	13	Avoided relegation

Updated to match(es) played on 25 May 2019. Source: PFL.ua
Rules for classification: 1) Points; 2) Goal difference; 3) Goals scored; 4) Head-to-head points; 5) Head-to-head goal difference; 6) Head-to-head goals scored; 7) Fair play; 8) Draw or play-off.
(C) Champions; (P) Promoted

On 7 May 2019 it was announced that the final game between group winners of the Second League will take place in Kropyvnytskyi.

1 June 2019
17:00 UTC+3

FC Mynai	0 – 1	FC Kremin Kremenchuk
	Report	Cherniy 78'

Zirka Stadium, Kropyvnytskyi
Attendance: 520
Referee: Viktor Kopiyevskyi

Kremin Kremenchuk are crowned Champions of the Ukrainian Second League for the 2018–19 season

=== Cup competitions ===
==== Ukrainian Cup ====
15 May 2019
21:00 LST

Shakhtar Donetsk	4–0	Inhulets Petrove
Tetê 27', 39'; Moraes 45+1'; Solomon 64'	Report

Slavutych Arena, Zaporizhzhia
Attendance: 11,100 (press-release) (9,500 (info database))
Referee: Yevhen Aranovskyi

==== Super Cup ====
21 July 2018
21:00 EEST

Shakhtar Donetsk	0 – 1	Dynamo Kyiv
Ismaily (red card) 90+7'	Report	18' Buyalskyi; (yellow card) 13' (yellow-red card) 90+7' Burda

Chornomorets Stadium, Odesa
Attendance: 27,400
Referee: Kostyantyn Trukhanov

== Women's club football ==
League	Promoted to league	Relegated from league
Higher League	Voskhod Stara Maiachka	~~Lehenda-ShVSM Chernihiv~~; Ateks SDIuShOR-16 Kyiv

Note: For all scratched clubs, see section Clubs removed for more details

=== Higher League ===
Pos	Team	Pld	W	D	L	GF	GA	GD	Pts	Qualification or relegation
1	Zhytlobud-1 Kharkiv (Note: Participant of the 2018–19 Ukrainian Women's Cup final.) (C, Q)	18	18	0	0	110	1	+109	54	Qualification to Champions League
2	Zhytlobud-2 Kharkiv	18	16	0	2	115	6	+109	48	
3	Voskhod Stara Maiachka	18	10	2	6	31	31	0	32	
4	WFC Lviv	18	9	2	7	39	38	+1	29	Withdrew after the season
5	Iednist Plysky	18	9	2	7	39	35	+4	29	
6	Ladomyr Volodymyr-Volynskyi	18	7	1	10	24	45	−21	22	
7	Iatran Berestivets	18	4	5	9	16	25	−9	17	
8	Rodyna Kostopil	18	4	2	12	14	59	−45	14	
9	Pantery Uman	18	3	1	14	14	83	−69	10	
10	Zlahoda-Dnipro-1 (O)	18	2	1	15	18	97	−79	7	Qualification to relegation play-offs

Source: WFPL.ua
Rules for classification: 1) Points; 2) Head-to-head points; 3) Head-to-head goal difference; 4) Head-to-head goals scored; 5) Goal difference; 6) Goals scored.
(C) Champions; (O) Play-off winners; (Q) Qualified for the phase indicated
Notes:

The drawing for relegation playoff took place on 13 June 2019.

Team 1	Agg.	Team 2	1st leg	2nd leg
SC Vyshneve	w/o	Zlahoda-Dnipro-1		

Zlahoda-Dnipro-1 won on walkover and has preserved its berth in the Ukrainian Women's League. SC Vyshneve withdrew from league competitions. Later SC Dnipro-1 informed the Ukrainian Association of Football that it will not field its female team next season.

== Managerial changes ==
This is a list of managerial changes among Ukrainian professional football clubs (top two leagues):

Team	Outgoing manager	Manner of departure	Date of vacancy	Table	Incoming manager	Date of appointment	Table
Volyn Lutsk	(Ukraine) Viktor Bohatyr	Contract ended	31 May 2018	Pre-season	(Ukraine) Andriy Tlumak	1 June 2018	Pre-season
Obolon-Brovar Kyiv	(Ukraine) Volodymyr Pyatenko	Resigned	31 May 2018	Pre-season	(Ukraine) Serhiy Kovalets	13 June 2018	Pre-season
Zirka Kropyvnytskyi	(Ukraine) Roman Monaryov	Resigned	6 June 2018	Pre-season	(Ukraine) Andriy Horban (interim)	13 June 2018	Pre-season
FC Lviv	(Ukraine) Andriy Khanas (interim)	Club reorganized (in place of NK Veres Rivne)	unannounced	Pre-season	(Ukraine) Andriy Demchenko (interim)	8 June 2018	Pre-season
Chornomorets Odesa	(Ukraine) Kostyantyn Frolov	Dismissed (w/o details)	13 June 2018	Pre-season	(Bulgaria) Angel Chervenkov	13 June 2018	Pre-season
Arsenal Kyiv	(Ukraine) Serhiy Litovchenko	"Laid off" (Note: On 20 August 2018 in interview to internet newsmedia Footboom Serhiy Litovchenko explained his dismissal from the club pointing out that he still was under contract and will sue the club. On 1 November 2018 the FFU chamber on settling of disagreements fined FC Arsenal-Kyiv and laid a transfer ban onto the club following the case Litovchenko vs FC Arsenal-Kyiv.)	22 June 2018	Pre-season	(Italy) Fabrizio Ravanelli	22 June 2018	Pre-season
FC Lviv	(Ukraine) Andriy Demchenko	End of interim	29 June 2018	Pre-season	(Brazil) Gilmar	3 July 2018	Pre-season
FC Lviv	(Brazil) Gilmar	Resigned (Note: On 13 August 2018 the Football Federation of Ukraine informed the club that Gilmar does not have the UEFA PRO license and therefore cannot be the club's head coach (manager).)	14 August 2018	7th	(Ukraine) Yuriy Bakalov	16 August 2018	7th
Karpaty Lviv	(Ukraine) Oleh Boychyshyn	Sacked	16 August 2018	8th	(Portugal) José Morais	16 August 2018	8th
Rukh Vynnyky	(Ukraine) Andriy Kikot	Resigned	9 September 2018	15th	(Ukraine) Vitaliy Romanyuk (caretaker)	11 September 2018	15th
Metalist 1925 Kharkiv	(Ukraine) Serhiy Valyayev	Fired	11 September 2018	7th	(Ukraine) Oleksandr Horyainov (caretaker)	11 September 2018	7th
Arsenal Kyiv	(Italy) Fabrizio Ravanelli	Resigned	22 September 2018	12th	(Ukraine) Vladyslav Humenyuk	22 September 2018	12th
Arsenal Kyiv	(Ukraine) Vladyslav Humenyuk	End of interim	1 October 2018	12th	(Ukraine) Vyacheslav Hroznyi (Note: On 30 November 2018 in interview to Sport Express Hroznyi stated that he does not have a contract with Arsenal, but rather a gentlemen's agreement and expires on 30 November 2018. Soon thereafter FC Arsenal Kyiv made a press-release announcing that Hroznyi's contract is valid until 30 June 2019. Next day Hroznyi explained that the contract actually does exist, but there is the gentlemen's agreement as well and in case of poor financing he will leave club.)	1 October 2018	12th
Rukh Vynnyky	(Ukraine) Vitaliy Romanyuk (caretaker)	End of caretaker spell	26 September 2018	14th	(Ukraine) Yuriy Virt	26 September 2018	14th
Rukh Vynnyky	(Ukraine) Yuriy Virt	Resigns	14 November 2018	13th	(Belarus) Leonid Kuchuk (Note: After the resignation of Yuriy Virt, the club installed Vitaliy Romanyuk as caretaker since the club was scheduled to play a scheduled friendly match against Karpaty Lviv prior to the club going into vacation for the winter break and announcing that a permanent head coach would be announced at the start of the new year.)	1 January 2019	13th
Olimpik Donetsk	(Ukraine) Roman Sanzhar	Mutual consent	3 October 2018	7th	(Ukraine) Vyacheslav Shevchuk	3 October 2018	7th
MFC Mykolaiv	(Ukraine) Ruslan Zabranskyi	Mutual consent	23 November 2018	9th	(Ukraine) Serhiy Shyshchenko	6 December 2018	9th
Karpaty Lviv	(Portugal) José Morais	Contract terminated (Note: Same day he was appointed as a manager of Jeonbuk Hyundai Motors FC, South Korea (twitter at 19:27 of the Seoul's time).)	28 November 2018	10th	(Ukraine) Oleh Boychyshyn (interim)	28 November 2018	10th
Metalist 1925 Kharkiv	(Ukraine) Oleksandr Horyainov (caretaker)	End of caretaker spell	10 December 2018	2nd	(Ukraine) Oleksandr Horyainov	10 December 2018	2nd
Hirnyk-Sport Horishni Plavni	(Ukraine) Serhiy Puchkov	End of contract	1 January 2019	12th	(Ukraine) Volodymyr Mazyar	1 January 2019	12th
PFC Sumy	(Ukraine) Serhiy Zolotnytskyi	Resigned	4 January 2019	11th	(Ukraine) Oleksandr Oliynyk (interim)	3 February 2019	11th
PFC Sumy	(Ukraine) Oleksandr Oliynyk (interim)	End of interim	19 March 2019	11th	(Ukraine) Oleh Lutkov	19 March 2019	11th
Arsenal Kyiv	(Ukraine) Vyacheslav Hroznyi	Mutual agreement	9 January 2019	12th	(Ukraine) Ihor Leonov	16 January 2019	12th
Karpaty Lviv	(Ukraine) Oleh Boychyshyn	End of interim	13 January 2019	10th	(Spain) Fabri	13 January 2019	10th
Vorskla Poltava	(Ukraine) Vasyl Sachko	Contract terminated	27 March 2019	7th	(Ukraine) Vitaliy Kosovskyi (interim)	28 March 2019	7th
FC Lviv	(Ukraine) Yuriy Bakalov	Mutual consent	8 April 2019	6th	(Ukraine) Taras Hrebenyuk (interim)	8 April 2019	6th
FC Lviv	(Ukraine) Taras Hrebenyuk	End of interim	16 April 2019	5th	(Ukraine) Bohdan Blavatskyi	16 April 2019	5th
Ahrobiznes Volochysk	(Ukraine) Andriy Donets	admin. punishment	9 April 2019	14th	(Ukraine) Andriy Donets (acting)	9 April 2019	14th
Olimpik Donetsk	(Ukraine) Vyacheslav Shevchuk	Mutual consent	17 April 2019	10th	(Ukraine) Ihor Klymovskyi (interim)	17 April 2019	10th
Karpaty Lviv	(Spain) Fabri	Resigned (heath concerns)	27 May 2019	10th	(Ukraine) Oleksandr Chyzhevskyi (interim)	27 May 2019	10th

== Clubs removed ==
=== Before the season ===
- Stal Kamianske, 12th place of the 2017–18 Ukrainian Premier League, was originally relegated, but later withdraw from the First League. The same day the PFL president confirmed that the league will consist of 16 teams. Originally, FC Stal Kamianske that were located in Kamianske played its games of the 2017–18 Ukrainian Premier League season in Kyiv. After relegation the club was admitted to the First League representing Bucha, Kyiv Oblast. Prior to the season commencing the club was renamed to FC Feniks Bucha.
- Naftovyk-Ukrnafta Okhtyrka, the Professional Football League allowed the club to keep its berth in the second tier even after its main sponsor announced that it will discontinue to fund the club. After the season completed, Ukrnafta (related to the Privat Group) who sponsored Naftovyk-Ukrnafta Okhtyrka decided to liquidate the club since it was a tax liability.
- Zhemchuzhyna Odesa withdrew after Round 31 during 2017–18 season. Technical losses were adjudged against the team in the last three matches. At time of withdrawal, Zhemchuzhyna's had played 31 matches, with a record of 7 wins, 6 draws and 18 losses, scoring 33 goals and having conceded 54 goals.
- Arsenal-Kyivshchyna Bila Tserkva failed attestation for the season and was removed from the league
- FC Ternopil after failing to arrive for their Round 6 away match against Polissya Zhytomyr, several days later informed the PFL that they are withdrawing from the competition. The club played four matches in the competition with a record of 4 losses scoring two goals and allowing nine goals scored against them. The PFL annulled their results as per league regulations and removed them from the official standings on the decision of the FFU Control and Disciplinary Committee of 7 September 2017.
- FC Metalurh Zaporizhzhia – prior to attestation, the club merged with FC Spartak-KPU Zaporizhzhia (a team of local university, KPU), but on 6 June 2018, the club failed attestation for the season and the club's administration decided to dissolve the team
- Inhulets-2 Petrove – the main club's administration of Inhulets Petrove decided to dissolve the second team
- Sudnobudivnyk Mykolaiv – failed attestation
- Skala Stryi – passed attestation, but dissolved its senior team protesting the FFU accusations in gambling. On 14 June 2018, there appeared information that the club will merge its academy with FC Volyn Lutsk.

=== During or after the season ===
- Arsenal–Kyiv withdrew from professional competitions after being relegated from the Premier League.
- PFC Sumy received new ownership during winter break in the face of Serhiy Vashchenko who earlier this season was supposed to become the owner of Kobra Kharkiv. The new head coach of the Sumy club who had been announced was also former head coach of Kobra, Oleksandr Oliynyk. At the same time according to the former club's director Anatoliy Boiko, on 1 December 2018 PFC Sumy did not have any players on contract. On 11 April 2019, the FFU Control and Disciplinary Committee adopted its decision to strip the club of professional status and exclude the club from any competitions that it is participating currently or in the future. However the club has a right to file an appeal. Additional separate sanctions were to be also applied against the club's playing and administrative personnel. On 14 April 2019, the chairman of the FFU committee of ethics and fair play Francesco Baranka noted in regards to additional sanctions that PFC Sumy has earned €10 million in match fixing. More to it, Ukrainian coach Oleksandr Sevidov who held post of head coach consultant in PFC Sumy and previously managed FC Illichivets Mariupol received a lifetime disqualification.
- On 17 February 2019, president of FC Zirka Kropyvnytskyi commented on his club's withdrawal from further participation in competitions of the Ukrainian First League. The president accused the newly formed NABU and law enforcement authorities in pressure against him. The president of the league expressed his surprise claiming that there seemed no real reason why the club had to withdraw. On 5 April 2019, the PFL council of leagues adopted its decision to remove FC Zirka Kropyvnytskyi from the League as it officially withdrew on 14 March 2019. On 22 April 2019, the club's vice-president announced that the club will restart from regional competitions with intention to return the club's pro-status in the future.
- Helios Kharkiv, the club reorganized under new management under a new name as FC Kobra Kharkiv. The club merged with another amateur club called the Kobra Football Academy which was playing in the Kharkiv Oblast Football Championship. On 15 August 2018 the club informed the Professional Football League of Ukraine about withdrawal from professional competitions, and were later officially expelled from the league.
- FC Myr Hornostayivka withdrew from competitions in protest.
- Zlahoda-Dnipro-1 (dissolved)
- WFC Lviv (dissolved)
