= 2018–19 Ukrainian First League =

Ukrainian First League
- Season: 2018–19
- Champions: SC Dnipro-1
- Promoted: SC Dnipro-1; Kolos Kovalivka
- Relegated: ~~Sumy~~ (expelled); ~~Zirka~~ (withdrew); ~~Kobra~~ (expelled)
- Matches: 182
- Goals: 481 (2.64 per match)
- Top goalscorer: 17 — Stanislav Kulish (Dnipro-1)
- Biggest home win: 7 – Dnipro-1 7–0 Sumy (Round 22)
- Biggest away win: 7 – Sumy 0–7 Volyn (Round 20)
- Highest scoring: 8 – Prykarpattia 7–1 Zirka (Round 8); Volyn 5–3 Hirnyk-Sport (Round 15)
- Longest winning run: 6 – Metalist 1925 (Round 13–18); Dnipro-1 (Round 15–20)
- Longest unbeaten run: 19 – Kolos (Round 2–15, 17–21)
- Longest winless run: 13 – Ahrobiznes (Round 1–6, 8–14)
- Longest losing run: 9 – Zirka (Round 8–16)
- Highest attendance: 22 362 – Metalist – Dnipro-1 (Round 19)
- Lowest attendance: 150 – Sumy – Rukh (Round 15)
- Total attendance: 334385
- Average attendance: 1837
- All statistics correct as of 11 May 2019.

The 2018–19 Ukrainian First League was the 28th since its establishment. The competition began on 21 July 2018 with the match between Prykarpattia Ivano-Frankivsk and Balkany Zorya. The competition was in recess for a winter break which started after the completion of Round 18 on 18 November 2018. The competition resumed on 24 March 2019 and ended on 25 May 2019.

== Format ==
The format of the league was approved at the PFL Conference on 27 June 2018. In some aspects it was similar to previous, but it was adopted in two versions in case if there will be decision to expand the Ukrainian Premier League back to 16 clubs for 2019–20 season.

As in the previous season the season winner will earn direct promotion to the top division, while two runners-up (2nd and 3rd places) will contest additional promotion berths through play-off games with weaker club of the UPL (10th and 11th places). At the same time in case of the UPL possible expansion the first four teams will earn promotion with the fifth team qualifying for play-off games with the UPL wooden spoon team. In regards to relegation it was decided that the last three teams will be relegated to the Second League, but in case of the UPL possible expansion only two teams will be relegated.

In mid-July 2018, due to withdrawal of FC Naftovyk-Ukrnafta Okhtyrka and FC Stal Kamianske (FC Feniks Bucha), the PFL adopted 16 teams league format.

On 15 November 2018, in interview to Sport Arena the president of the PFL Ukraine Serhiy Makarov stated that teams that will place 16th and 15th places will be replaced with both winners of Druha Liha groups winners, while 13th and 14th place will contest their relegation with Druha Liha groups runners-up. If there will be an expansion of the UPL to 16 teams, the exchange between Persha and Druha leagues changes as well. The first and second places in each groups of Druha Liha will be promoted, while third places will play-off the other two promotional berths with the 15th and the 16th places of Persha Liha. The president pointed that with withdrawal of Kobra (Helios) and with expansion of the UPL, one of the third placed clubs in Druha Liha will be promoted to Persha Liha without play-offs.

== Teams ==
=== Promoted teams ===
The following teams have been promoted from the 2017–18 Ukrainian Second League:

- Ahrobiznes Volochysk – first place of the 2017–18 Ukrainian Second League Group A (debut)
- Prykarpattia Ivano-Frankivsk – second place of the 2017–18 Ukrainian Second League Group A (debut, another club named as Prykarpattia Ivano-Frankivsk competed in the 2010–11 season)
- SC Dnipro-1 – first place of the 2017–18 Ukrainian Second League Group B (debut)
- Metalist 1925 Kharkiv – second place of the 2017–18 Ukrainian Second League Group B (debut, however another club named as Metalist Kharkiv competed in the 2003–04 season)

=== Relegated teams ===
The following teams have been relegated from the 2017–18 Ukrainian Premier League:

- Zirka Kropyvnytskyi – 10th place of the 2017–18 Ukrainian Premier League, play-off defeat (returns after 2 seasons)
- Chornomorets Odesa, 11th place of the 2017–18 Ukrainian Premier League, was originally relegated after the relegation play-off defeat, however due to the withdrawal of newly promoted FC Poltava from the Ukrainian Premier League, the club remains in 2018–19 Ukrainian Premier League to replace FC Poltava.

=== Withdrawn teams ===
- Stal Kamianske, 12th place of the 2017–18 Ukrainian Premier League, was originally relegated, but later withdraw from the First League. The same day the PFL president confirmed that the league will consist of 16 teams. Originally, FC Stal Kamianske that were located in Kamianske played its games of the 2017–18 Ukrainian Premier League season in Kyiv. After relegation the club was admitted to the First League representing Bucha, Kyiv Oblast. Prior to the season commencing the club was renamed to FC Feniks Bucha.
- Naftovyk-Ukrnafta Okhtyrka, the Professional Football League allowed the club to keep its berth in the second tier even after its main sponsor announced that it will discontinue to fund the club.
- Helios Kharkiv, the club reorganized under new management under a new name as FC Kobra Kharkiv. The club merged with another amateur club called the Kobra Football Academy which was playing in the Kharkiv Oblast Football Championship. On 15 August 2018 the club informed the Professional Football League of Ukraine about withdrawal from professional competitions, and were later officially expelled from the league.
- Zirka Kropyvnytskyi, the club withdrew as its management and owners were involved in corruption scandal.

=== Location map ===
The following displays the location of teams.

Home venues of teams in the 2018–19 Ukrainian First League.

== Stadiums ==
The following stadiums are considered home grounds for the teams in the competition.

Rank	Stadium	Location	Capacity	Club	Notes
1	OSC Metalist	Kharkiv	40,003	Metalist 1925 Kharkiv	
2	Dnipro-Arena	Dnipro	31,003	SC Dnipro-1	
3	Ukraina Stadium	Lviv	28,051	Rukh Vynnyky	Used in Rounds 12, 14, 17, and 19
4	Yuvileiny Stadium	Sumy	25,800	PFC Sumy	
5	Central City Stadium	Mykolaiv	16,700	MFC Mykolaiv	
6	MCS Rukh	Ivano-Frankivsk	15,000	Prykarpattia Ivano-Frankivsk	
7	Zirka Stadium	Kropyvnytskyi	13,667	Zirka Kropyvnytskyi	
8	Avanhard Stadium	Lutsk	12,080	Volyn Lutsk	
9	Naftovyk Stadium	Okhtyrka	5,256	PFC Sumy	Used in Rounds 15, 16, and 18
10	Obolon Arena	Kyiv	5,100	Obolon-Brovar Kyiv	
11	Park Peremohy Stadium	Mykolaiv	5,000	MFC Mykolaiv	Used in Rounds 19 and 21
12	Prapor Stadium	Kramatorsk	4,000	Avanhard Kramatorsk	
13	Skif Stadium	Lviv	3,742	Rukh Vynnyky	Used in Round 21
14	Yunist Stadium	Volochysk	2,700	Ahrobiznes Volochysk	
15	Yunist Stadium	Horishni Plavni	2,500	Hirnyk-Sport Horishni Plavni	
16	Bohdan Markevych Stadium	Vynnyky, Lviv	2,100 (Note: The attendance for the Round 1 game was 2,100 which is greater that the publicized capacity of 900.)	Rukh Vynnyky	
17	Boris Tropanets Stadium	Zorya, Sarata Raion	1,854	Balkany Zorya	
18	Kolos Stadium	Kovalivka, Vasylkiv Raion	1,850	Kolos Kovalivka	
19	Inhulets Stadium	Petrove	1,720	Inhulets Petrove	

== Managers ==
Club	Head coach	Replaced coach
Ahrobiznes Volochysk	(Ukraine) Andriy Donets	
Avanhard Kramatorsk	(Ukraine) Oleksandr Kosevych	
Balkany Zorya	(Ukraine) Andriy Parkhomenko	
SC Dnipro-1	(Ukraine) Dmytro Mykhaylenko	
Hirnyk-Sport Horishni Plavni	(Ukraine) Volodymyr Mazyar	(Ukraine) Serhiy Puchkov
Inhulets Petrove	(Ukraine) Serhiy Lavrynenko	
Kolos Kovalivka	(Ukraine) Ruslan Kostyshyn	
Metalist 1925 Kharkiv	(Ukraine) Oleksandr Horyainov	(Ukraine) Serhiy Valyayev
MFC Mykolaiv	(Ukraine) Serhiy Shyshchenko	(Ukraine) Ruslan Zabranskyi
Obolon-Brovar Kyiv	(Ukraine) Serhiy Kovalets	
Prykarpattia Ivano-Frankivsk	(Ukraine) Volodymyr Kovalyuk	
Rukh Vynnyky	(Belarus) Leonid Kuchuk (Note: After the resignation of Yuriy Virt, the club installed Vitaliy Romanyuk as caretaker since the club was scheduled to play a scheduled friendly match against Karpaty Lviv prior to the club going into vacation for the winter break and announcing that a permanent head coach would be announced at the start of the new year.)	(Ukraine) Andriy Kikot (Ukraine) Vitaliy Romanyuk (caretaker) (Ukraine) Yuriy Virt
PFC Sumy	(Ukraine) Oleh Lutkov	(Ukraine) Serhiy Zolotnytskyi (Ukraine) Oleksandr Oliynyk (interim)
Volyn Lutsk	(Ukraine) Andriy Tlumak	
Zirka Kropyvnytskyi	(Ukraine) Andriy Horban (interim)	

=== Managerial changes ===
Team	Outgoing head coach	Manner of departure	Date of vacancy	Table	Incoming head coach	Date of appointment
Volyn Lutsk	(Ukraine) Viktor Bohatyr	Contract ended	31 May 2018	Pre-season	(Ukraine) Andriy Tlumak	1 June 2018
Obolon-Brovar Kyiv	(Ukraine) Volodymyr Pyatenko	Resigned	31 May 2018	Pre-season	(Ukraine) Serhiy Kovalets	13 June 2018
Zirka Kropyvnytskyi	(Ukraine) Roman Monaryov	Resigned	6 June 2018	Pre-season	(Ukraine) Andriy Horban (interim)	13 June 2018
Rukh Vynnyky	(Ukraine) Andriy Kikot	Resigned	9 September 2018	15th	(Ukraine) Vitaliy Romanyuk (caretaker)	11 September 2018
Metalist 1925 Kharkiv	(Ukraine) Serhiy Valyayev	Fired	11 September 2018	7th	(Ukraine) Oleksandr Horyainov (caretaker)	11 September 2018
Rukh Vynnyky	(Ukraine) Vitaliy Romanyuk (caretaker)	End of caretaker spell	26 September 2018	14th	(Ukraine) Yuriy Virt	26 September 2018
Rukh Vynnyky	(Ukraine) Yuriy Virt	Resigns	14 November 2018	13th	(Belarus) Leonid Kuchuk	1 January 2019
MFC Mykolaiv	(Ukraine) Ruslan Zabranskyi	Mutual consent	23 November 2018	9th	(Ukraine) Serhiy Shyshchenko	6 December 2018
Metalist 1925 Kharkiv	(Ukraine) Oleksandr Horyainov (caretaker)	End of caretaker spell	10 December 2018	2nd	(Ukraine) Oleksandr Horyainov	10 December 2018
Hirnyk-Sport Horishni Plavni	(Ukraine) Serhiy Puchkov	End of contract	1 January 2019	12th	(Ukraine) Volodymyr Mazyar	1 January 2019
PFC Sumy	(Ukraine) Serhiy Zolotnytskyi	Resigned	4 January 2019	11th	(Ukraine) Oleksandr Oliynyk (interim)	3 February 2019
PFC Sumy	(Ukraine) Oleksandr Oliynyk (interim)	End of interim	19 March 2019	11th	(Ukraine) Oleh Lutkov	19 March 2019
Ahrobiznes Volochysk	(Ukraine) Andriy Donets	admin. punishment	9 April 2019	14th	(Ukraine) Andriy Donets (acting)	9 April 2019

== League table ==
Pos	Team	Pld	W	D	L	GF	GA	GD	Pts	Promotion, qualification or relegation
1	SC Dnipro-1 (C, P)	28	21	4	3	72	21	+51	67	Promotion to Ukrainian Premier League
2	Kolos Kovalivka (O, P)	28	15	9	4	45	18	+27	54	Qualification to promotion play-offs
3	Volyn Lutsk (Note: Volyn Lutsk was deducted six points according to a decision by FIFA Disciplinary Committee for a debt to a Serbian club FK Rad related to the transfer of Ivan Rogac.)	28	17	7	4	55	30	+25	52	Qualification to promotion play-offs
4	Metalist 1925 Kharkiv	28	15	6	7	35	20	+15	51	
5	Avanhard Kramatorsk	28	14	6	8	44	26	+18	48	
6	Obolon-Brovar Kyiv	28	13	8	7	35	28	+7	47	
7	Inhulets Petrove	28	11	9	8	35	32	+3	42	
8	Balkany Zorya	28	10	8	10	28	31	−3	38	
9	MFC Mykolaiv	28	10	7	11	34	32	+2	37	
10	Prykarpattia Ivano-Frankivsk	28	10	4	14	41	39	+2	34	
11	Rukh Vynnyky	28	8	10	10	35	35	0	34	
12	Hirnyk-Sport Horishni Plavni	28	5	12	11	24	43	−19	27	
13	Ahrobiznes Volochysk (O)	28	3	10	15	17	36	−19	19	Qualification to relegation play-offs
14	PFC Sumy (Note: PFC Sumy received new ownership during winter break in the face of Serhiy Vashchenko who earlier this season was supposed to become the owner of Kobra Kharkiv. The new head coach was announced also former head coach of Kobra, Oleksandr Oliynyk. According to the former club's director Anatoliy Boiko, on 1 December 2018 PFC Sumy did not have any players on contract. On 11 April 2019, the FFU Control and Disciplinary Committee adopted its decision to strip the club of professional status and exclude the club from any competitions that it is participating currently or in the future. However the club has a right to file an appeal. Additional separate sanctions will be also applied against the club's playing and administrative personnel. On 14 April 2019, the chairman of the FFU committee of ethics and fair play Francesco Baranka noted that PFC Sumy has earned some €10 million in match fixing. More to it, Ukrainian coach Oleksandr Sevidov who held post of head coach consultant in PFC Sumy and previously managed FC Illichivets Mariupol received a lifetime disqualification.) (D, R)	28	3	7	18	21	91	−70	16	Qualification to relegation play-offs
15	Zirka Kropyvnytskyi (Note: On 17 February 2019, president of FC Zirka Kropyvnytskyi commented on his club's withdrawal from further participation in competitions of the Ukrainian First League. The president accused the newly formed NABU and law enforcement authorities in pressure against him. The president of the league expressed his surprise claiming that there seemed no real reason why the club had to withdraw. On 5 April 2019, the PFL council of leagues adopted its decision to remove FC Zirka Kropyvnytskyi from the League as it officially withdrew on 14 March 2019. On 22 April 2019, the club's vice-president announced that the club will restart from regional competitions with intention to return the club's pro-status in the future.) (D)	28	1	1	26	10	49	−39	4	Withdrawn
–	Kobra Kharkiv (Note: Kobra Kharkiv (former Helios) after failing to field a team for their Round 4 home match against Hirnyk-Sport Horishni Plavni informed the PFL that they are withdrawing from the competition. The club played three matches in the competition with a record of 3 losses scoring one goals and allowing eight goals scored against them. The PFL annulled their results as per league regulations and removed them from the official standings on the decision of the FFU Control and Disciplinary Committee of 23 August 2018. Note, last year the club competed as FC Helios Kharkiv and was supposed to be merged with another Kharkiv club which continued to compete at amateur level.) (D)	0	–	–	–	–	–	—	0	Results annulled

Updated to match(es) played on 2 June 2019. Source: PFL.ua
Rules for classification: 1) Points; 2) Goal difference; 3) Goals scored; 4) Head-to-head points; 5) Head-to-head goal difference; 6) Head-to-head goals scored; 7) Fair play; 8) Draw or "golden match" (if tied for first).
(C) Champions; (D) Disqualified; (O) Play-off winners; (P) Promoted; (R) Relegated

=== Position by round ===
Team ╲ Round	1	2	3	4	5	6	7	8	9	10	11	12	13	14	15	16	17	18	19	20	21	22	23	24	25	26	27	28	29	30
SC Dnipro-1	3	1	1	2	2	1	1	1	1	1	1	1	1	1	1	1	1	1	1	1	1	1	1	1	1	1	1	1	1	1
Kolos Kovalivka	1	4	7	4	4	3	6	2	2	2	2	2	2	3	4	4	4	3	3	2	2	2	3	2	2	3	3	2	2	2
Volyn Lutsk	5	2	2	1	1	2	2	3	3	3	3	3	3	2	2	2	3	5	6	5	5	5	5	5	3	2	2	3	3	3
Metalist 1925	4	8	5	3	5	9	5	7	6	8	5	4	4	4	3	3	2	2	2	3	4	3	4	3	4	4	4	4	4	4
Avanhard Kramatorsk	2	5	3	5	6	4	4	6	8	7	6	8	6	7	7	7	6	6	5	6	6	6	6	6	6	6	6	6	6	5
Obolon-Brovar Kyiv	8	10	12	9	7	5	3	4	4	5	7	6	7	5	6	5	5	4	4	4	3	4	2	4	5	5	5	5	5	6
Inhulets Petrove	12	13	13	10	8	7	7	5	5	6	4	5	5	6	5	6	7	7	7	7	8	7	8	8	7	7	7	7	7	7
Balkany Zorya	7	7	8	6	9	6	8	9	9	10	10	10	10	9	9	9	8	8	8	8	7	8	7	7	8	8	8	8	9	8
MFC Mykolaiv	9	6	4	7	3	8	9	8	7	4	8	7	8	8	8	8	9	9	9	9	9	9	9	9	9	9	10	10	8	9
Prykarpattia Ivano-Frankivsk	11	9	10	12	13	11	10	10	10	9	9	9	9	10	10	10	10	10	10	10	10	10	10	10	10	10	9	9	10	10
Rukh Vynnyky	13	11	9	11	12	13	15	15	15	14	13	13	13	13	13	13	13	13	12	11	11	11	11	11	11	11	11	11	11	11
Hirnyk-Sport Horishni Plavni	10	16	11	13	11	12	11	12	12	12	12	11	11	11	11	11	12	12	13	13	12	12	12	12	12	12	12	12	12	12
Ahrobiznes Volochysk	14	12	14	14	14	14	14	13	13	13	14	14	14	14	14	14	14	14	14	14	14	14	14	14	14	14	14	14	14	13
PFC Sumy	6	3	6	8	10	10	12	11	11	11	11	12	12	12	12	12	11	11	11	12	13	13	13	13	13	13	13	13	13	14
Zirka Kropyvnytskyi	15	14	15	15	15	15	13	14	14	15	15	15	15	15	15	15	15	15	15	15	15	15	15	15	15	15	15	15	15	15
~~Kobra Kharkiv~~	~~16~~	~~15~~	~~16~~	~~16~~	–	–	–	–	–	–	–	–	–	–	–	–	–	–	–	–	–	–	–	–	–	–	–	–	–	–

Updated to match(es) played on 25 May 2019. Source: pfl.ua

=== Results ===
Home \ Away	AHR	AVK	BAZ	DN1	HIS	IHP	KOK	MKH	MYK	OBK	PIF	RUV	SUM	VOL	ZIR
Ahrobiznes Volochysk		0–1	0–2	0–1	0–0	1–2	0–3	0–2	1–1	1–2	2–3	1–1	3–0 (Note: Round 19 match Ahrobiznes versus Sumy did not take place as Sumy could not arrive due to having some administrative issues in regards to submitting documents on time. On 22 April 2019 the latest review of round games in the First League at the FFU website showed that on 11 April 2019 the FFU CDC adopted decision to award technical victory for Ahrobiznes (3:0) and technical lost for Sumy (0:3) for failing to appear.)	0–2	5–0
Avanhard Kramatorsk	0–0		1–2	1–2	1–1	3–1	0–1	1–0	2–3	1–0	3–1	1–2	6–0	0–1	+:–
Balkany Zorya	0–0	1–2		0–2	2–0	1–2	0–0	0–1	2–1 (Note: Round 18 match postponed later after the winter break due to the condition of the pitch at Boris Tropanets Stadium. Scheduled to play on 9 May 2019, later the date was changed to 2 April 2019.)	1–1	3–2	2–1	1–1	2–2	3–0
Dnipro-1	4–0	1–0	3–0		6–0	3–3	3–1	0–2	4–0	1–3	2–1	3–0	7–0	5–0	4–0
Hirnyk-Sport Horishni Plavni	1–1	1–1	1–0	0–3		1–1	2–1	1–1	0–1	2–1	2–2	0–0	1–2	0–0	1–0
Inhulets Petrove	0–0	2–4	0–0	1–2	4–2		0–1	1–0	2–0	3–2	0–1	0–0	6–0	1–1	+:–
Kolos Kovalivka	1–0	2–2	0–0	1–1	5–2	0–0		0–0	2–0	3–2	3–1	0–1	4–0	1–1	+:–
Metalist 1925 Kharkiv	2–0	1–0	3–0	1–2	2–1	1–1	0–0		1–0	0–1	2–0	2–1	4–1	1–0	+:–
MFC Mykolaiv	1–1	0–0	2–1	0–2	0–0	0–1	0–3	3–0		0–0	1–0	4–1	1–1	1–2	3–1
Obolon-Brovar Kyiv	1–0	0–1	1–1	1–1	1–0	1–1	1–1	1–0	2–1		3–2	0–0	0–2	2–4	1–0
Prykarpattia Ivano-Frankivsk	1–0	0–1	0–1	4–0	1–0	4–0	0–1	2–2	1–2	0–1		1–0	1–1	1–3	7–1
Rukh Vynnyky	4–0	3–3	1–0	1–3	0–0	0–1	0–2	1–1	1–1	0–3	2–2		10–1	1–3	+:–
PFC Sumy	1–1	0–3	0–1	0–4	2–2	0–1	0–6	1–3	0–8	0–0	2–3	0–1		0–7 (Note: Game played in Lutsk)	3–1
Volyn Lutsk	0–0	0–1	4–2	1–1	5–3	2–1	2–1	2–0	1–0	2–4	1–0	1–1	3–0		3–1
Zirka Kropyvnytskyi	+:–	1–5	+:–	0–2	+:–	2–0	0–2	0–3	+:–	+:–	+:–	0–2	3–3	0–2	

Updated to match(es) played on 26 May 2019. Source: (in Ukrainian)
Legend: Blue = home team win; Yellow = draw; Red = away team win.

== Post season play-offs ==
=== Relegation play-offs ===
The drawing for relegation playoff took place on 20 May 2019.

Team 1	Agg.	Team 2	1st leg	2nd leg
FC Metalurh Zaporizhya	1–4	FC Ahrobiznes Volochysk	0–4	1–0
PFC Sumy	1–7	FC Cherkashchyna-Akademiya	0–4	1–3

=== First leg ===
29 May 2019
19:00 UTC+3

Metalurh Zaporizhia	0–4	Ahrobiznes Volochysk
	Report	Kurylo 9', 17' (pen.); Slotyuk 45'; Chernenko 86'

Slavutych Arena, Zaporizhia

29 May 2019
13:00 UTC+3

PFC Sumy	0–4	Cherkashchyna-Akademiya
	Report	Medved 58'; Zelenevych 62'; Tymofiyenko 70'; Chorniy 73'

Yuvileiny Stadium, Sumy

=== Second leg ===
2 June 2019
18:00 UTC+3

Ahrobiznes Volochysk	0–1	Metalurh Zaporizhia
	Report	Krapyvnyi 50'

Yunist Stadium, Volochysk
Referee: Dmytro Kryvushkin (Kharkiv)

Ahrobiznes Volochysk won 4–1 on aggregate and has preserved its berth for the 2019–20 Ukrainian First League. Metalurh Zaporizhia has kept its berth for the 2019–20 Ukrainian Second League, but later gained promotion due to withdrawal of Arsenal-Kyiv from professional ranks.

2 June 2019
15:00 UTC+3

Cherkashchyna-Akademiya	3–1	PFC Sumy
Koshadze 3'; Storchous 26'; Boyko 54'	Report	Popov 24'

Zoria Stadium, Bilozirya
Referee: Serhiy Boiko (Kyiv Oblast)

Cherkashchyna-Akademiya won 7–1 on aggregate and was promoted to the 2019–20 Ukrainian First League. PFC Sumy was relegated to the 2019–20 Ukrainian Second League. Later following the PFL Conference PFC Sumy were excluded from professional competitions.

== Top goalscorers ==
As of 19 May 2019

Rank	Scorer	Team	Goals (Pen.)
1	(Ukraine) Stanislav Kulish	SC Dnipro-1	17 (5)
2	(Ukraine) Denys Kozhanov	Volyn Lutsk	16 (8)
3	(Ukraine) Ihor Kirienko	Avanhard Kramatorsk	13 (1)
4	(Ukraine) Bohdan Orynchak	Prykarpattia Ivano-Frankivsk	12
5	(Ukraine) Ihor Kohut	SC Dnipro-1	11
5	(Ukraine) Oleksandr Akymenko	Inhulets Petrove	11 (1)
5	(Ukraine) Yehor Demchenko	Avanhard Kramatorsk	11 (2)
8	(Ukraine) Oleh Synytsya	Metalist 1925 Kharkiv	10 (3)
8	(Ukraine) Yaroslav Konkolnyak	Prykarpattia Ivano-Frankivsk	10 (5)
10	(Ukraine) Oleksiy Chychykov	SC Dnipro-1	9
10	(Ukraine) Oleksandr Bondarenko	Kolos Kovalivka	9 (1)

== Awards ==
=== Monthly awards ===
Month	Player of the Month		
Month	Player	Club	Reference
August 2018	(Ukraine) Oleksandr Akymenko	Inhulets Petrove	
September 2018	(Ukraine) Oleksandr Nazarenko	SC Dnipro-1	
October 2018	(Ukraine) Serhiy Romanov	Metalist 1925 Kharkiv	
November 2018	(Ukraine) Bohdan Orynchak	Prykarpattia Ivano-Frankivsk	
March 2019	(Ukraine) Orest Kuzyk	SC Dnipro-1	
April 2019	(Iran) Siavash Hagh Nazari	Volyn Lutsk	
May 2019	(Ukraine) Vitaliy Havrysh	Kolos Kovalivka	

=== Round awards ===
Round	Player			Coach		
Round	Player	Club	Reference	Coach	Club	Reference
Round 1	(Ukraine) Dmytro Kozban	Volyn Lutsk		(Ukraine) Oleksandr Kosevych	Avanhard Kramatorsk	
Round 2	(Ukraine) Denys Kozhanov	Volyn Lutsk		(Ukraine) Dmytro Mykhaylenko	SC Dnipro-1	
Round 3	(Ukraine) Oleh Synytsya	Metalist 1925 Kharkiv		(Ukraine) Andriy Tlumak	Volyn Lutsk	
Round 4	(Ukraine) Dmytro Pospyelov	Metalist 1925 Kharkiv		(Ukraine) Serhiy Valyayev	Metalist 1925 Kharkiv	
Round 5	(Ukraine) Dmytro Kozban	Volyn Lutsk		(Ukraine) Serhiy Kovalets	Obolon-Brovar Kyiv	
Round 6	(Ukraine) Oleksandr Akymenko	Inhulets Petrove		(Ukraine) Dmytro Mykhaylenko (2)	SC Dnipro-1	
Round 7	(Ukraine) Oleksandr Derebchynskyi	Obolon-Brovar Kyiv		(Ukraine) Serhiy Kovalets (2)	Obolon-Brovar Kyiv	
Round 8	(Ukraine) Oleksandr Bondarenko	Kolos Kovalivka		(Ukraine) Serhiy Lavrynenko	Inhulets Petrove	
Round 9	(Ukraine) Denys Kozhanov	Volyn Lutsk		(Ukraine) Serhiy Kovalets (3)	Obolon-Brovar Kyiv	
Round 10	(Ukraine) Andriy Kovalyov	MFC Mykolaiv		(Ukraine) Oleksandr Kosevych (2)	Avanhard Kramatorsk	
Round 11	(Ukraine) Denys Kostyshyn	Kolos Kovalivka		(Ukraine) Dmytro Mykhaylenko (3)	SC Dnipro-1	
Round 12	(Ukraine) Stanislav Kulish	SC Dnipro-1		(Ukraine) Dmytro Mykhaylenko (4)	SC Dnipro-1	
Round 13	(Ukraine) Ihor Kirienko	Avanhard Kramatorsk		(Ukraine) Dmytro Mykhaylenko (5)	SC Dnipro-1	
Round 14	(Ukraine) Serhiy Romanov	Metalist 1925 Kharkiv		(Ukraine) Andriy Parkhomenko	Balkany Zorya	
Round 15	(Ukraine) Bohdan Semenets	Ahrobiznes Volochysk		(Ukraine) Serhiy Lavrynenko (2)	Inhulets Petrove	
Round 16	(Ukraine) Ihor Kirienko	Avanhard Kramatorsk		(Ukraine) Oleksandr Kosevych (3)	Avanhard Kramatorsk	
Round 17	(Ukraine) Bohdan Orynchak	Prykarpattia Ivano-Frankivsk		(Ukraine) Volodymyr Kovalyuk	Prykarpattia Ivano-Frankivsk	
Round 18	(Ukraine) Ihor Zahalskyi	SC Dnipro-1		(Ukraine) Ruslan Kostyshyn	Kolos Kovalivka	
winter break
Round 19	(Ukraine) Stanislav Kulish	SC Dnipro-1		(Ukraine) Oleksandr Kosevych (4)	Avanhard Kramatorsk	
Round 20	(Ukraine) Mykola Zlatov	Balkany Zorya		(Ukraine) Serhiy Kovalets (4)	Obolon-Brovar Kyiv	
Round 21	(Ukraine) Ihor Kirienko	Avanhard Kramatorsk		(Ukraine) Ruslan Kostyshyn (2)	Kolos Kovalivka	
Round 22	(Ukraine) Denys Kozhanov	Volyn Lutsk		(Ukraine) Andriy Tlumak (2)	Volyn Lutsk	
Round 23	(Ukraine) Yuriy Batyushyn	Hirnyk-Sport Horishni Plavni		(Ukraine) Andriy Parkhomenko (2)	Balkany Zorya	
Round 24	(Ukraine) Oleh Synytsia	Metalist 1925 Kharkiv		(Belarus) Leonid Kuchuk	Rukh Vynnyky	
Round 25	(Ukraine) Bohdan Orynchak	Prykarpattia Ivano-Frankivsk		(Ukraine) Andriy Tlumak (3)	Volyn Lutsk	
Round 26	(Ukraine) Vladyslav Voitsekhovskyi	MFC Mykolaiv		(Ukraine) Serhiy Shyshchenko	MFC Mykolaiv	
Round 27	(Ukraine) Denys Kozhanov	Volyn Lutsk		(Ukraine) Andriy Tlumak (4)	Volyn Lutsk	
Round 28	(Ukraine) Yuriy Klymchuk	Rukh Vynnyky		(Ukraine) Volodymyr Kovalyuk (2)	Prykarpattia Ivano-Frankivsk	
Round 29	(Ukraine) Oleksandr Nazarenko	SC Dnipro-1		(Ukraine) Oleksandr Kosevych (5)	Avanhard Kramatorsk	
Round 30	(Ukraine) Vitaliy Havrysh	Kolos Kovalivka		(Ukraine) Ruslan Kostyshyn (3)	Kolos Kovalivka	

== See also ==
- 2018–19 Ukrainian Premier League
- 2018–19 Ukrainian Second League
- 2018–19 Ukrainian Cup
