= 2018–19 Ukrainian Cup =

Tournament details
- Country: Ukraine
- Dates: 18 July 2018 – 15 May 2019; 18 July 2018 – 22 August 2018 (preliminary rounds); 26 September 2018 – 15 May 2019 (main event)
- Teams: 50

Final positions
- Champions: Shakhtar Donetsk (13th title)
- Runners-up: Inhulets Petrove
- Semifinalists: SC Dnipro-1; Zorya Luhansk
- UEFA Europa League: none (Note: the winner qualified for the UEFA Champions League)

Tournament statistics
- Matches played: 47
- Goals scored: 120 (2.55 per match)
- Attendance: 141,065 (3,001 per match)
- Top goal scorer: 4 – Robert Hehedosh (FC Mynai)
- All statistics correct as of 15 May 2019.

The 2018–19 Ukrainian Cup was the 28th annual season of Ukraine's football knockout competition, running from 18 July 2018 to 15 May 2019.

All competition rounds consist of a single game with a home field advantage granted to a team from lower league. Qualification for the competition is granted to all professional clubs and finalists of the Ukrainian Amateur Cup as long as those clubs were able to pass the season's attestation (licensing).

FC Shakhtar Donetsk was the defending winner for the last two seasons. The Donetsk club has reached the competition finals in the last eight years winning six of them. There were around 300 clubs over the history of competition.

== Team allocation and schedule ==
The competition included all professional first teams from the Premier League (12/12 teams of the league), First League (16/16), Second League (20/20) and two best teams from the previous year's Amateur Cup.

=== Distribution ===
| First round (20 teams) | 18 entrants from the Second League 2 entrants from the Amateur Cup | |
| Second round (28 teams) | 16 entrants from the First League 2 entrants from the Second League | 10 winners from the first round |
| Round of 32 (20 teams) | 6 entrants from the Premier League | 14 winners from the second round |
| Round of 16 (16 teams) | 6 entrants from the Premier League | 10 winners from the Round of 32 |

=== Rounds schedule ===
| Phase | Round | Fractional | Draw date | Game date^{(1)} |
|---|---|---|---|---|
| Preliminary | Round 1 | 1/64 finals | 10 July 2018 | 18 July 2018 |
| Preliminary | Round 2 | 1/32 finals | 20 July 2018 | 22 August 2018 |
| Main event | Round of 32 | 1/16 finals | 31 August 2018 | 26 September 2018 |
| Main event | Round of 16 | 1/8 finals | 28 September 2018 | 31 October 2018 |
| Main event | Quarter-finals | 1/4 finals | 2 November 2018 | 3 April 2019 |
| Main event | Semi-finals | 1/2 finals | 8 April 2019 | 24 April 2019 |
| Main event | Final | | 15 May 2019 | |

Notes:

- ^(1) Main date, when most of the games scheduled to play; an auxiliary date might be granted in case of emergencies

=== Teams ===
| Enter in First Round | | Enter in Second Round | | Enter in Round of 32 | Enter in Round of 16 |
| AAFU; 2 teams | PFL League 2; 18/20 teams | PFL League 2; 2/20 teams | PFL League1; 16/16 teams | UPL; 6/12 teams | UPL; 6/12 teams |
| LNZ-Lebedyn; Viktoriya Mykolaivka | Bukovyna Chernivtsi; Chaika Petropavlivska Borshchahivka*; Enerhiya Nova Kakhovka; Hirnyk Kryvyi Rih*; FC Kalush*; Krystal Kherson*; Naftovyk-Ukrnafta Okhtyrka; FC Nikopol; Nyva Ternopil; Nyva Vinnytsia; Metalurh Zaporizhia*; FC Mynai*; Myr Hornostayivka; Podillya Khmelnytskyi; Polissya Zhytomyr; Real Pharma Odesa; Tavriya Simferopol; Veres Rivne | Cherkashchyna Cherkasy; Kremin Kremenchuk | Ahrobiznes Volochysk; Avanhard Kramatorsk; Balkany Zorya; SC Dnipro-1; Hirnyk-Sport; Inhulets Petrove; Kobra Kharkiv; Kolos Kovalivka; Metalist 1925 Kharkiv; MFC Mykolaiv; Obolon-Brovar Kyiv; Prykarpattia Ivano-Frankivsk; Rukh Vynnyky; PFC Sumy; Volyn Lutsk; Zirka Kropyvnytskyi | Arsenal Kyiv; Chornomorets Odesa; Desna Chernihiv; Karpaty Lviv; FC Oleksandriya; Olimpik Donetsk | Dynamo Kyiv; FC Lviv; FC Mariupol; Shakhtar Donetsk; Vorskla Poltava; Zorya Luhansk |

Notes:

- With the asterisk (*) are noted the Second League teams that were recently admitted to the league from amateurs and the AAFU (amateur) team(s) that qualified in place of the Amateur Cup finalist(s).
- Naftovyk-Ukrnafta Okhtyrka withdrew just before the season start but were drawn for the cup competitions, before the club announced its final decision.
- One of the Second League teams (reserves) were not drawn for the competition: Mykolaiv-2.

== Bracket ==
The following is the tournament bracket that the Ukrainian Cup resembled. Numbers in parentheses next to the match score represent the results of a penalty shoot-out.

Round of 32; 25-25 September 2018
FC Kalush (a.e.t.) | 1
Metalist 1925 Kharkiv | 0
SC Dnipro-1 | 2
Volyn Lutsk | 1
Chornomorets Odesa | 3
FC Oleksandriya | 0
Zirka Kropyvnytskyi (p) | 1 (4)
Olimpik Donetsk | 1 (5)
FC Mynai | 3
MFC Mykolaiv | 1
Myr Hornostaivka | 0
Inhulets Petrove | 3
Cherkashchyna-Akademiya (a.e.t.) | 3
Arsenal Kyiv | 2
PFC Sumy | 0
Karpaty Lviv | 3
Nyva Vinnytsia | 0 (3)
Hirnyk Kryvyi Rih (p) | 0 (4)
Krystal Kherson | 2
Desna Chernihiv | 3

Round of 16; 31 October 2018
FC Kalush | 0
SC Dnipro-1 | 3
Chornomorets Odesa | 1
Vorskla Poltava | 2
Shakhtar Donetsk | 3
Olimpik Donetsk | 2
FC Mynai | 1
Dynamo Kyiv | 3
Inhulets Petrove | 3
FC Mariupol | 1
Cherkashchyna-Akademiya | 0
Karpaty Lviv | 1
Hirnyk Kryvyi Rih | 0
FC Lviv | 1
Desna Chernihiv | 1 (4)
Zorya Luhansk (p) | 1 (5)

Quarter-finals; 7 April 2019
SC Dnipro-1 | 2
Vorskla Poltava | 0
Shakhtar Donetsk (p) | 1 (4)
Dynamo Kyiv | 1 (3)
Inhulets Petrove (p) | 1 (5)
Karpaty Lviv | 1 (4)
FC Lviv | 0
Zorya Luhansk | 1

Semi-finals; 17 April 2019
SC Dnipro-1 | 0
Shakhtar Donetsk | 2
Inhulets Petrove | 2
Zorya Luhansk | 1

Final; 15 May 2019
Shakhtar Donetsk | 4
Inhulets Petrove | 0

== Competition schedule ==
Legends: AM – AAFU (amateur) competitions (IV tier), 2L – Second League (III tier), 1L – First League (II tier), PL – Premier League (I tier)

=== First Preliminary round (1/64) ===
In this round sixteen clubs from the Second League and both finalists of the 2017–18 Ukrainian Amateur Cup played. The draw for this round was held on 10 July 2018 at the House of Football in Kyiv. The round matches were played on 18 July 2018.

| 17 July 2018 | Tavriya Simferopol (2L) | 1 – 0 | (2L) Chaika Petropavlivska-Borshchahivka | Beryslav, Kherson Oblast |
| 18:00 | Fetisov 13' | Report | | Stadium: Mashynobudivnyk (Note: Game was played at Mashynobudivnyk Stadium, Beryslav as Tavriya Simferopol is forced to play away from Simferopol due to the 2014 Russian occupation of Crimea.); Attendance: 250; Referee: Dmytro Kuzovlev (Zaporizhia) |

| 18 July 2018 | Viktoriya Mykolaivka (AM) | 2 – 1 | (2L) Nyva Ternopil | Mykolaivka, Sumy Oblast |
| 17:00 | Akimov 14', 18' | Report | Pikul 71' (pen.); Slonevskyi (yellow card) 68' (yellow-red card) 77' | Stadium: Viktoriya; Attendance: 100; Referee: Andriy Kovalenko (Poltava) |

| 18 July 2018 | LNZ-Lebedyn (AM) | 0 – 0 (a.e.t.) (4–2 p) | (2L) Polissya Zhytomyr | Lebedyn, Cherkasy Oblast |
| 17:00 | | Report | | Stadium: LNZ-Arena; Attendance: 100; Referee: Ihor Bych (Kyiv) |
| | Penalties |
| | Kalynych (penalty scored); Horshchynskyi (penalty scored); Hud (penalty scored); Vakulenko (penalty scored) | | Ivanov (penalty missed); Khodulya (penalty scored); Sokurenko (penalty scored); Baranov (penalty missed) |

| 18 July 2018 | Naftovyk-Ukrnafta Okhtyrka (2L) | walkover^{(3)} | (2L) Hirnyk Kryvyi Rih |
| 15:00 | | Report |

| 18 July 2018 | FC Kalush (2L) | 1 – 1 (a.e.t.) (4–3 p) | (2L) Bukovyna Chernivtsi | Kalush, Ivano-Frankivsk Oblast |
| 17:00 | Holubka 66' | Report | Ponedelnik 20' | Stadium: Khimik; Attendance: 100; Referee: Mykhailo Raida (Zakarpattia) |
| | Penalties |
| | Tanchyn (penalty scored); Deneha (penalty scored); Drahan (penalty missed); Skakun (penalty scored); Mys (penalty scored) | | Melkonyan (penalty missed); Raulyuk (penalty scored); Batrak (penalty scored); Kuziv (penalty scored); Tkachenko (penalty missed) |

| 18 July 2018 | Enerhiya Nova Kakhovka (2L) | 0 – 1 | (2L) Krystal Kherson | Nova Kakhovka, Kherson Oblast |
| 17:30 | | Report | Barladym 62' | Stadium: Enerhiya; Attendance: 100; Referee: Hennadiy Serputko (Odesa) |

| 18 July 2018 | Real Pharma Odesa (2L) | 0 – 2 | (2L) Nyva Vinnytsia | Odesa |
| 17:30 | | Report | Andreyev 8'; Shapovalenko 79' | Stadium: Ivan; Referee: Vladyslav Bakulin (Nova Kakhovka) |

| 18 July 2018 | Podillya Khmelnytskyi (2L) | 0 – 2 | (2L) Metalurh Zaporizhya | Khmelnytskyi |
| 18:00 | | Report | Oliynyk 55'; Sarapiy 74' | Stadium: Podillia; Attendance: 100; Referee: Pavlo Dubrovets (Zhytomyr) |

| 18 July 2018 | Veres Rivne (2L) | 1 – 1 (a.e.t.) (9–10 p) | (2L) FC Mynai | Mlyniv, Rivne Oblast |
| 18:00 | Dubina 89' | Report | Shpak 84' | Stadium: Kolos; Attendance: 100; Referee: Andriy Kholyavko (Lviv) |
| | Penalties |
| | Haponchuk (penalty scored); Bondarenko (penalty scored); Skotarenko (penalty scored); Zayikyn (penalty scored); Dubina (penalty scored); Semenchuk (penalty scored); Herasymchuk (penalty scored); Flyak (penalty scored); Petskiv (penalty scored); Barabash (penalty missed) | | Shpak (penalty scored); Dopilka (penalty scored); Mynailenko (penalty scored); Loboda (penalty scored); Hehedosh (penalty scored); Mykulyak (penalty missed); Smokorovskyi (penalty scored); Betsa (penalty scored); Stasyuk (penalty scored); Pynyashko (penalty scored) |

| 18 July 2018 | FC Nikopol (2L) | 1 – 4 | (2L) Myr Hornostayivka | Nikopol, Dnipropetrovsk Oblast |
| 17:30 | Mandrovskyi 78' | Report | Boyko 7'; Holyadynets 14'; Kryvych 33'; Tsybulskyi 41' | Stadium: Elektrometalurh; Attendance: 100; Referee: Oleksandr Tytov (Donetsk) |

Notes:

- ^(3) Hirnyk Kryvyi Rih received a bye to the next round after Naftovyk-Ukrnafta Okhtyrka was expelled from the PFL prior to the start of the competition.

=== Second Preliminary round (1/32) ===
In this round all the 16 clubs will enter from the First League, two other recently relegated clubs of the Second League, nine winners of the previous round and one team which received a bye. The draw for this round was held 20 July 2018 at the House of Football in Kyiv. The round matches were played on 22 August 2018.

| 22 August 2018 | Nyva Vinnytsia (2L) | 2–1 | (1L) Hirnyk-Sport Horishni Plavni | Vinnytsia |
| 17:00 | Shestakov 49', 56'; Korovikov (penalty missed) 81' | Report | Shevchuk 57' | Stadium: Tsentralnyi Miskyi; Attendance: 1,800; Referee: Anastasia Romanyuk (Ivano-Frankivsk) |

| 22 August 2018 | Viktoriya Mykolaivka (AM) | 1–1 (a.e.t.) (1–3 p) | (2L) Myr Hornostayivka | Mykolaivka, Sumy Oblast |
| 17:00 | Yatsenko (red card) 29'; Bohachov 48' | Report | Boyko 30' | Stadium: Viktoriya; Attendance: 500; Referee: Oleh Buyashov (Dnipro) |
| | Penalties |
| | Akimov (penalty missed); Sereda (penalty missed); Bohachov (penalty scored); Sukhodub (penalty missed) | | (penalty scored) Chmelenko; (penalty missed) Volkov; (penalty missed) Tsybulskyi; (penalty scored) Boyko; (penalty scored) Pyatov |

| 22 August 2018 | LNZ-Lebedyn (AM) | 1–1 (a.e.t.) (2–4 p) | (2L) Hirnyk Kryvyi Rih | Lebedyn, Cherkasy Oblast |
| 17:00 | Vakulenko 5' | Report | Santrapynskykh 76' | Stadium: LNZ Arena; Attendance: 700; Referee: Klym Zabroda (Kyiv) |
| | Penalties |
| | Kalynych (penalty scored); Hrytsai (penalty scored); Hud (penalty missed); Vakulenko (penalty missed) | | (penalty scored) Pohranychnyi; (penalty scored) Buka; (penalty scored) Santrapynskykh; (penalty scored) Hryhoryk |

| 22 August 2018 | FC Mynai (2L) | 3–1 | (1L) Prykarpattia Ivano-Frankivsk | Minaj, Zakarpattia Oblast |
| 17:00 | Hehedosh 20', 21'; Havrylenko 44' | Report | Tsyutsyura 42' | Stadium: Mynai Arena; Attendance: 1,200; Referee: Andriy Koshura (Chernivtsi) |

| 22 August 2018 | Cherkashchyna-Akademiya Bilozirya (2L) | 3–1 | (1L) Rukh Vynnyky | Bilozirya, Cherkasy Oblast |
| 17:00 | Storchous 3'; Loktionov 8', 14' | Report | Batalskyi 17' | Stadium: Zorya; Attendance: 214; Referee: Denys Reznikov (Kamianske) |

| 22 August 2018 | FC Kalush (2L) | 2–1 (a.e.t.) | (1L) Avanhard Kramatorsk | Kalush, Ivano-Frankivsk Oblast |
| 17:00 | Andrusenko 45+1'; Heneha 112' | Report | Luchyk 43' | Stadium: Khimik; Attendance: 2,100; Referee: Vadym Zaprutnyak (Uzhhorod) |

| 22 August 2018 | Tavriya Simferopol (2L) | 2–3 (a.e.t.) | (1L) Volyn Lutsk | Beryslav, Kherson Oblast |
| 17:00 | Kuksenko 25'; Bizhko 101' | Report | Klymets 13'; Karpenko 109'; Kurko 118' | Stadium: Mashynobudivnyk; Attendance: 640; Referee: Dmytro Panchyshyn (Kharkiv) |

| 22 August 2018 | Kremin Kremenchuk (2L) | 1–2 | (1L) Zirka Kropyvnytskyi | Kremenchuk, Poltava Oblast |
| 17:00 | Vovkodav 20' | Report | Rudnytskyi 55', 68' | Stadium: Kremin Arena; Attendance: 1,000; Referee: Oleksandr Tytov (Donetsk) |

| 22 August 2018 | PFC Sumy (1L) | walkover^{(5)} | (1L) Kobra Kharkiv |
| | | Report |

| 22 August 2018 | Balkany Zorya (1L) | 0–1 | (1L) MFC Mykolaiv | Zorya, Odesa Oblast |
| 17:00 | | Report | Berko 27' | Stadium: imeni Borysa Tropantsia; Attendance: 1,700; Referee: Pavlo Dubrovets (Zhytomyr) |

| 22 August 2018 | Krystal Kherson (2L) | 1 – 1 (a.e.t.) (4–2 p) | (1L) Ahrobiznes Volochysk | Kherson |
| 17:00 | Zhovtyuk 90' | Report | Hrusha 38' | Stadium: Krystal; Attendance: 1,000; Referee: Vladyslav Dorosh (Kyiv) |
| | Penalties |
| | Tsoi (penalty scored); Karas (penalty scored); Kucher (penalty scored); Laptyev (penalty scored) | | Temnyuk (penalty missed); Kurylo (penalty scored); Yurchak (penalty missed); Skakun (penalty scored) |

| 22 August 2018 | Inhulets Petrove (1L) | 1–0 | (1L) Kolos Kovalivka | Petrove, Kirovohrad Oblast |
| 19:00 | Kozlov 46' | Report | | Stadium: Inhulets; Attendance: 680; Referee: Oleksandr Afanasyev (Kharkiv) |

| 22 August 2018 | Metalist 1925 Kharkiv (1L) | 2–0 | (1L) Obolon-Brovar Kyiv | Kharkiv |
| 19:00 | Sula 49'; Pospelov 86' | Report | | Stadium: Metalist; Attendance: 5,638; Referee: Andriy Kovalenko (Poltava) |

| 20 September 2018 | Metalurh Zaporizhya (2L) | 0–2^{(6)} | (1L) SC Dnipro-1 | Zaporizhia |
| 19:00 | | Report | Kravchenko 54'; Kulish 77' | Stadium: Slavutych Arena; Attendance: 5,770; Referee: Vladyslav Dorosh (Kyiv) |

Notes:

- ^(5) PFC Sumy received a bye to the next round after Kobra Kharkiv withdrew from the Professional Football League of Ukraine.
- ^(6) Match postponed and was played 19 September due to unavailability of Slavutych-Arena with other future planned matches taking precedence.

=== Round of 32 (1/16) ===
In this round lower placed 6 clubs from the Premier League will enter along with 14 winners of the previous round, including 7 clubs from the First League and 7 clubs from the Second League. The draw for this round was held 31 August 2018 at the House of Football in Kyiv. The round matches were played on 26 September 2018.

| 25 September 2018 | PFC Sumy (1L) | 0–3 | (PL) Karpaty Lviv | Sumy |
| 18:30 | | Report | Holodyuk 32'; Vargas 57'; Hutsulyak 73' | Stadium: Yuvileiny; Attendance: 1,400; Referee: D.Kryvushkin (Kharkiv) |

| 26 September 2018 | Krystal Kherson (2L) | 2–3 | (PL) Desna Chernihiv | Kherson |
| 15:00 | Barladym 76'; Bryzhchuk 90+3' | Report | D. Favorov 52'; Volkov 60'; Khlyobas 81' | Stadium: Krystal; Attendance: 1,626; Referee: I.Bondar (Kyiv) |

| 26 September 2018 | Myr Hornostayivka (2L) | 0–3 | (1L) Inhulets Petrove | Hornostaivka, Kherson Oblast |
| 15:30 | | Report | Kovalenko 20'; Sichinava 75'; Khuchbarov 90+4' | Stadium: Zatys; Attendance: 155; Referee: O.Afanasyev (Kharkiv) |

| 26 September 2018 | Nyva Vinnytsia (2L) | 0–0 (a.e.t.) (3–4 p) | (2L) Hirnyk Kryvyi Rih | Vinnytsia |
| 16:00 | | Report | | Stadium: Tsentralnyi Miskyi; Attendance: 1,500; Referee: Oleksandr Titov (Donetsk) |
| | Penalties |
| | Savoshko (penalty missed); Nayko (penalty missed); Fedosov (penalty scored); Dolinskyi (penalty scored); Shestakov (penalty scored) | | (penalty scored) Pohranichnyi; (penalty scored) Santrapynskykh; (penalty missed) Buka; (penalty scored) Hryhoryk; (penalty scored) Yarovoy |

| 26 September 2018 | FC Kalush (2L) | 1–0 (a.e.t.) | (1L) Metalist 1925 Kharkiv | Kalush, Ivano-Frankivsk Oblast |
| 16:00 | Knysh 116' | Report | | Stadium: Khimik; Attendance: 4,500; Referee: A.Kovalenko (Poltava) |

| 26 September 2018 | FC Mynai (2L) | 3–1 | (1L) MFC Mykolaiv | Mynai, Zakarpattia Oblast |
| 17:00 | Kobin 36' (pen.); Hehedosh 68'; Pynyashko 71' | Report | | Stadium: Mynai Arena; Attendance: 1,287; Referee: I.Bych (Kyiv) |

| 26 September 2018 | Cherkashchyna-Akademiya Bilozirya (2L) | 3–2 (a.e.t.) | (PL) Arsenal Kyiv | Bilozirya, Cherkasy Oblast |
| 17:00 | Tymofiyenko 83', 87'; Tarasenko 115' | Report | Semotyuk 26'; Sukhoruchko 66' | Stadium: Zorya; Attendance: 670; Referee: K.Trukhanov (Kharkiv) |

| 26 September 2018 | Zirka Kropyvnytskyi (1L) | 1–1 (a.e.t.) (4–5 p) | (PL) Olimpik Donetsk | Kropyvnytskyi |
| 17:00 | Kondrakov 87' (pen.) | Report | Politylo 38' | Stadium: Zirka; Attendance: 694; Referee: Dmytro Panchyshyn (Kharkiv) |
| | Penalties |
| | Duhiyenko (penalty scored); Nerubenko (penalty scored); Kondrakov (penalty scored); Pysarev (penalty scored); Safronov (penalty missed) | | (penalty scored) Politylo; (penalty scored) Do Couto; (penalty scored) Koltsov; (penalty scored) Dehtyarev; (penalty scored) Balashov |

| 26 September 2018 | SC Dnipro-1 (1L) | 2–1 | (1L) Volyn Lutsk | Dnipro |
| 18:30 | Kravchenko 20'; Chychykov 64' | Report | Zinkevych 85' | Stadium: Dnipro-Arena; Attendance: 2,641; Referee: Y. Ivanov (Donetsk Oblast) |

| 26 September 2018 | Chornomorets Odesa (PL) | 3–0 | (PL) FC Oleksandriya | Odesa |
| 19:00 | Chorniy 43' (pen.), 83'; Koval 75' | Report | | Stadium: Chornomorets; Attendance: 3,200; Referee: O.Omelchenko (Slovyansk) |

=== Round of 16 ===
In this round the other 6 clubs from the Premier League will enter along with 10 winners of the previous round including 4 more clubs from the Premier League, 2 clubs from the First League and 4 clubs from the Second League. The draw for this round was held 28 September 2018 at the House of Football in Kyiv. The round matches was played on 31 October 2018.

| 31 October 2018 | FC Kalush (2L) | 0–3 | (1L) SC Dnipro-1 | Kalush, Ivano-Frankivsk Oblast |
| 14:00 | | Report | Mihunov 22'; Kulish 33'; Nazarenko 41' | Stadium: Khimik; Attendance: 3,816; Referee: D.Kryvushkin |

| 31 October 2018 | FC Mynai (2L) | 1–3 | (PL) Dynamo Kyiv | Mynai, Zakarpattia Oblast |
| 14:00 | Hehedosh 21' | Report | Shaparenko 50', 54'; Harmash 58' | Stadium: Mynai Arena; Attendance: 2,630; Referee: Y. Ivanov |

| 31 October 2018 | Hirnyk Kryvyi Rih (2L) | 0–1 | (PL) FC Lviv | Kryvyi Rih, Dnipropetrovsk Oblast |
| 14:00 | | Report | Araujo 81' | Stadium: Shakhta Zhovtneva; Attendance: 2,300; Referee: D.Panchyshyn |

| 31 October 2018 | Inhulets Petrove (1L) | 3–1 | (PL) FC Mariupol | Petrove, Kirovohrad Oblast |
| 15:00 | Kozlov 24' (pen.); Khuchbarov 45'; Kobuladze 61' | Report | Polehenko 83' (pen.) | Stadium: Inhulets; Attendance: 600; Referee: V. Novokhatniy |

| 31 October 2018 | Chornomorets Odesa (PL) | 1–2 | (PL) Vorskla Poltava | Odesa |
| 17:00 | Hrachov 69' | Report | Sakiv 60'; Careca 63' (pen.) | Stadium: Chornomorets; Attendance: 2,639; Referee: V. Kopiyevskyi |

| 31 October 2018 | Cherkashchyna-Akademiya Bilozirya (2L) | 0–1 | (PL) Karpaty Lviv | Cherkasy |
| 18:00 | | Report | Ponde 80' | Stadium: Tsentralnyi^{(7)} Attendance: 1,512; Referee: A.Kovalenko |

| 31 October 2018 | Shakhtar Donetsk (PL) | 3–2 | (PL) Olimpik Donetsk | Kharkiv |
| 19:00 | Moraes 63' (pen.); Totovytskyi 66'; Danchenko 83' | Report | Bilonoh 55' (pen.); Hai 81' | Stadium: Metalist; Attendance: 3,505; Referee: M. Balakin |

| 31 October 2018 | Desna Chernihiv (PL) | 1–1 (a.e.t.) (4–5 p) | (PL) Zorya Luhansk | Chernihiv |
| 19:30 | Bezborodko 37' | Report | Lyednyev 84' | Stadium: imeni Yuriya Gagarina; Attendance: 4,081; Referee: I. Bondar |
| | Penalties |
| | A.Favorov (penalty scored); Filippov (penalty scored); Kartushov (penalty missed); Khlyobas (penalty scored); D.Favorov (penalty scored) | | (penalty scored) Karavayev; (penalty scored) Hromov; (penalty scored) Leonardo; (penalty scored) Lyednyev; (penalty scored) Kharatin |

Notes:

- ^(7) Match moved to the oblast centre of Cherkasy to accommodate a larger attendance

=== Quarterfinals ===
In this round advanced 6 representatives from the Premier League and 2 teams from the First League. The draw for this round was held on 2 November 2018 at the House of Football in Kyiv. The round matches will be played on 3 April 2019. Due to the 2019 Ukrainian presidential election, quarterfinal games of tournament were changed to 7 April 2019.

| 7 April 2019 | Inhulets Petrove (1L) | 1–1 (a.e.t.) (5–4 p) | (PL) Karpaty Lviv | Oleksandriia, Kirovohrad Oblast |
| 14:00 | Shchedryi 50' | Report | Shved 90+7' | Stadium: Nika; Attendance: 850; Referee: Yevhen Aranovskyi (Kyiv) |
| | Penalties |
| | Kovalyov (penalty scored); Synyohub (penalty scored); Pidnebennyi (penalty scored); Kozak (penalty scored); Sula (penalty scored) | | (penalty scored) Hutsulyak; (penalty scored) Myakushko; (penalty scored) Hongla; (penalty missed) Yoda; (penalty scored) Vargas Castillo |

| 7 April 2019 | SC Dnipro-1 (1L) | 2–0 | (PL) Vorskla Poltava | Dnipro |
| 17:00 | Kulish 78'; Kohut 83' | Report | | Stadium: Dnipro-Arena; Attendance: 9,148; Referee: Yuriy Mozharovskyi (Lviv) |

| 7 April 2019 | Shakhtar Donetsk (PL) | 1–1 (a.e.t.) (4–3 p) | (PL) Dynamo Kyiv | Kharkiv |
| 17:00 | Júnior Moraes 57' | Report | Harmash 9' | Stadium: Metalist; Attendance: 29,112; Referee: Maksym Kozyryatskyi (Zaporizhia) |
| | Penalties |
| | Kovalenko (penalty scored); Wellington Nem (penalty scored); Maycon (penalty scored); Solomon (penalty missed); Ismaily (penalty scored) | | (penalty missed) Mykolenko; (penalty scored) Kędziora; (penalty scored) Sidcley; (penalty scored) Tsyhankov; (penalty missed) Shepelyev |

| 7 April 2019 | FC Lviv (PL) | 0–1 | (PL) Zorya Luhansk | Lviv |
| 14:00 | | Report | Lyednyev 48' | Stadium: Ukrayina; Attendance: 2,645; Referee: Yaroslav Kozyk (Mukachevo) |

=== Semifinals ===
In this round advanced 2 representatives from the Premier League and 2 teams from the First League. The draw for this round was held on 8 April 2019 at the House of Football in Kyiv. The round matches were originally expected to be played on 24 April 2019, but due to the 2019 Ukrainian presidential election, were scheduled to 17 April 2019.

| 17 April 2019 | Inhulets Petrove (1L) | 2–1 | (PL) Zorya Luhansk | Petrove, Kirovohrad Oblast |
| | Zaporozhets 15'; Schedryi 38' | Report | Cheberko 45+1' | Stadium: Inhulets; Attendance: 1563; Referee: Dmytro Kutakov |

| 17 April 2019 | SC Dnipro-1 (1L) | 0–2 | (PL) Shakhtar Donetsk | Dnipro |
| | | Report | Dentinho 86'; Solomon 90+4' | Stadium: Dnipro-Arena; Attendance: 18,462; Referee: Ihor Paskhal |

=== Final ===
| 15 May 2019 | Shakhtar Donetsk (PL) | 4–0 | (1L) Inhulets Petrove | Slavutych-Arena, Zaporizhya |
| 21:00 LST | Tetê 27', 39'; Moraes 45+1'; Solomon 64' | Report | | Attendance: 11,100; Referee: Yevhen Aranovskyi, Kyiv |

== Top goalscorers ==
The competition's top ten goalscorers including qualification rounds.

As of 15 May 2019

| Rank | Scorer | Team | Goals (Pen.) |
|---|---|---|---|
| 1 | (Ukraine) Robert Hehedosh | FC Mynai | 4 |
| 2 | (Ukraine) Stanislav Kulish | SC Dnipro-1 | 3 |
| 2 | (Ukraine) Júnior Moraes | Shakhtar Donetsk | 3 (1) |
| 4 | 16 players | | 2 |

== See also ==
- 2018–19 Ukrainian Premier League
- 2018–19 Ukrainian First League
- 2018–19 Ukrainian Second League
- 2018–19 UEFA Europa League
- 2018–19 Ukrainian Amateur Cup
