= Robert Hehedosh =

Ukrainian footballer

Personal information
- Full name: Robert Volodymyrovych Hehedosh
- Date of birth: 2 May 1993 (age 33)
- Place of birth: Svaliava, Zakarpattia Oblast, Ukraine
- Height: 1.80 m (5 ft 11 in)
- Position: Forward

Youth career
- 2005–2006: SDYuShOR Uzhhorod
- 2006–2009: RVUFK Kyiv
- 2009–2010: SDYuShOR Uzhhorod

Senior career*
Years	Team	Apps	(Gls)
2009–2010	Zakarpattia Uzhhorod	0	(0)
2011–2013	Metalist Kharkiv	0	(0)
2013	Kremin Kremenchuk	3	(0)
2013	Meteor Pistryalovo	0	(0)
2014	Polyana	0	(0)
2014–2015	Hoverla Uzhhorod	0	(0)
2015–2016	Slavoj Sečovce	8	(21)
2016	Uzhhorod	21	(30)
2016–2017	Sačurov	4	(9)
2017–2020	Mynai	73	(54)
2020	Metalist 1925 Kharkiv	3	(0)
2020–2021	Veres Rivne	40	(8)
2022	Peremoha Dnipro	0	(0)
2022	→ Górnik Polkowice (loan)	9	(1)
2022	→ Pyunik (loan)	6	(0)
2023	St. Lucia	11	(1)
2023–2024	Keflavík	7	(0)
- * Club domestic league appearances and goals as of 10 November 2023

Robert Volodymyrovych Hehedosh (Ukrainian: Роберт Володимирович Гегедош; born 2 May 1993) is a Ukrainian professional footballer who plays as a forward.

== Biography ==
=== Metalist Kharkiv ===
In 2011, he signed a contract with Metalist Kharkiv. He made his debut against Beregvidek Berehove on 21 September in the 2011–12 Ukrainian Cup.

=== Peremoha Dnipro ===
In 2022 he moved to Peremoha Dnipro in the Ukrainian Second League.

=== St. Lucia ===
In January 2023 he moved to St. Lucia in the Maltese Premier League. On 15 April 2023 he scored against Ħamrun Spartans.

=== Keflavík ===
On 28 Juli 2023, after spending half a season on Malta, Hehedosh moved to Iceland to play for Keflavík.

== Honours ==
Meteor Pistryalovo

- Zakarpattia Oblast Championship: 2013

Mynai

- Zakarpattia Oblast Championship: 2017
- Zakarpattia Oblast Cup: 2017, 2018
- Zakarpattia Oblast Supercup: 2017

Veres Rivne

- Ukrainian First League: 2020–21

Pyunik

- Armenian Premier League: 2021–22

Individual

- Ukrainian Amateur League top scorer: 2017–18
- Ukrainian Second League Player of the Season: 2018–19
- Ukrainian Cup top scorer: 2018–19, 2020–21 (shared)
