= 2018–19 Ukrainian Women's Cup =

Tournament details
- Country: Ukraine
- Dates: 24 October 2018 – 8 June 2019
- Teams: 14

Final positions
- Champions: Zhytlobud-1 Kharkiv
- Runners-up: Voskhod Stara Mayachka

The 2018–19 Ukrainian Women's Cup was the 26th season of Ukrainian knockout competitions among women teams.

== Bracket ==
Round of 16
Zhytlobud-2 Kharkiv	2
Zhytlobud-1 Kharkiv	3
Yatran Berestivets	3
Rodyna-Litsei Kostopil	1
Luhanochka	-
Pantery Uman	+
Dnipro-1
bye
Vyshneve	1
Voskhod S. Mayachka	2
Mariupol	1
Ladomyr Volodymyr	2
Bukovynska Nadia V. K.	0
Lviv	9
Yednist Plysky
bye

Quarterfinals
Zhytlobud-1 Kharkiv	5
Yatran Berestivets	0
Pantery Uman	1
Dnipro-1 (a.e.t.)	2
Voskhod S. Mayachka	4
Ladomyr Volodymyr	1
Lviv (a.e.t.)	1
Yednist Plysky	0

Semifinals
Zhytlobud-1 Kharkiv	11
Dnipro-1	0
Voskhod S. Mayachka	1
Lviv	0

Final
Zhytlobud-1 Kharkiv	2
Voskhod Stara Mayachka	0

== Competition schedule ==
=== Round of 16 ===
24 October 2018	Zhytlobud-2 Kharkiv (I)	2–3	(I) Zhytlobud-1 Kharkiv	Kharkiv
12:00	Yana Malakhova 34', 75'	Report	Darya Apanashchenko 27', 89'; Olha Ovdiychuk 37'	Stadium: Sonyachnyi; Attendance: 800; Referee: Sofia Prychyna

24 October 2018	Yatran Berestivets (I)	3–1	(I) Rodyna-Litsei Kostopil
12:00	Maryna Kosik 11', 25'; Yulia Semenyuk 69'	Report	Yana Kotyk 58'	Attendance: 100; Referee: Oryna Ivannikova

Luhanochka (II)	0–3 (TR)	(I) Pantery Uman
	Report

24 October 2018	Vyshneve (II)	1–2	(I) Voskhod Stara Mayachka	Vyshneve
12:00	Karina Karabkina (Sorokina) 17'		Tetiana Levytska 61' (pen.); Yana Derkach 64'	Stadium: Miskyi; Attendance: 100; Referee: Inna Vakulko

24 October 2018	Mariupol (II)	1–2	(I) Ladomyr Volodymyr	Mariupol
	Olena Halak 30'		Maryna Shainyuk 50', 52'	Stadium: Zakhidnyi; Attendance: 50

24 October 2018	Bukovynska Nadia Velykyi Kuchuriv (II)	0–9	(I) Lviv	Chernivtsi
12:00			Inha Mostova 12', 43'; Romana Lukach 20'; Olena Manzyuk 24', 27', 52', 60', 64'; Lidiane de Oliveira 75'	Stadium: Bukovyna; Attendance: 50; Referee: Anastasia Romaniuk

=== Quarterfinals ===
Dnipro-1 and Yednist Plysky received bye.

17 November 2018	Pantery Uman (I)	1–2 (a.e.t.)	(I) Dnipro-1	Uman
12:00	Yevdokia Boychuk 46'	Report	Viktoria Byelik (Muzyka) 44'; Yulia Dekhtiar 120' (pen.); Maria Barchan (yellow card) 24' (yellow-red card) 32'	Stadium: Tsentralnyi; Attendance: 50; Referee: Kristina Kozoroh

17 November 2018	Voskhod Stara Mayachka (I)	4–1	(I) Ladomyr Volodymyr	Kherson
12:00	Yana Derkach 23', 40'; Yulia Stets 26'; Tetiana Levytska 84'	Report	Viktoria Hiryn 80'; Viktoria Hiryn (yellow card) 67' (yellow-red card) 82'	Stadium: KDYuSSh Osvita; Attendance: 150; Referee: Alyona Kvasha

17 November 2018	Lviv (I)	1–0 (a.e.t.)	(I) Yednist Plysky	Vynnyky
12:00	Olena Manzyuk 95'	Report	Alina Skydan (yellow card) 37' (yellow-red card) 105'	Stadium: im. B.Markevycha; Attendance: 200; Referee: Anastasia Romanyuk

18 November 2018	Zhytlobud-1 Kharkiv (I)	5–0	(I) Yatran Berestivets
12:00	Yulia Shevchuk 1'; Nadia Kunina 7'; Olha Ovdiychuk 41', 66'	Report	Ivanna Mushyn 30'	Attendance: 150; Referee: Lyudmyla Telbukh

=== Semifinals ===
1 May 2019	Zhytlobud-1 Kharkiv (I)	11–0	(I) Dnipro-1	Lyubotyn
15:00	Nadia Kunina 7', 9'; Yelizaveta Kostyuchenko 18', 67'; Taisia Nesterenko 23', 44'; Darya Apanashchenko 27', 42'; Kristine Aleksanyan 85'	Report		Stadium: Olimpiyets; Attendance: 100; Referee: Veronika Vasylchenko (Tahamlyk)

1 May 2019	Voskhod Stara Mayachka (I)	1–0	(I) Lviv	Oleshky
17:00	Tetiana Levytska 59' (pen.)	Report		Stadium: Start; Attendance: 1,000; Referee: Lyudmyla Telbukh

=== Final ===
8 June 2019	Zhytlobud-1 Kharkiv (I)	2–0	(I) Voskhod Stara Mayachka	Lviv
16:00	Darya Apanashchenko 13'; Yulia Shevchuk 41'	Report		Stadium: SKIF; Attendance: 600; Referee: Anastasia Romanyuk

== See also ==
- 2018–19 Vyshcha Liha (women)
- 2018–19 Ukrainian Cup
