= Serhiy Vovkodav =

Ukrainian footballer

Personal information
- Full name: Serhiy Vasylyovych Vovkodav
- Date of birth: 2 July 1988 (age 38)
- Place of birth: Lubny, Ukrainian SSR
- Height: 1.83 m (6 ft 0 in)
- Position: Defender

Youth career
- 2001–2002: Sportive School Lubny
- 2002–2005: Molod Poltava

Senior career*
| Years | Team | Apps | (Gls) |
| 2006–2015 | Vorskla Poltava | 9 | (0) |
| 2013–2014 | → Kremin Kremenchuk (loan) | 37 | (2) |
| 2015 | Illichivets Mariupol | 8 | (0) |
| 2016 | Poltava | 26 | (0) |
| 2017 | Kolos Kovalivka | 0 | (0) |
| 2017–2019 | Kremin Kremenchuk | 50 | (0) |

International career
| 2008–2009 | Ukraine U21 | 6 | (0) |
- * Club domestic league appearances and goals

Serhiy Vasylyovych Vovkodav (Ukrainian: Сергій Васильович Вовкодав; born 2 July 1988) is a Ukrainian former professional football defender.

Playing in the youth competitions of the Ukrainian Premier League in 2006–2013, on 27 May 2021 retained its record with the most games in competitions among under-21 teams.
