= Bohdan Sukhodub =

Ukrainian footballer

Personal information
- Full name: Bohdan Volodymyrovych Sukhodub
- Date of birth: 9 February 1994 (age 32)
- Place of birth: Ukraine
- Height: 1.86 m (6 ft 1 in)
- Position: Defender

Team information
- Current team: FC Sumy
- Number: 17

Youth career
- 2008–2009: FC Frunzenets Sumy
- 2009–2011: RVUFK Kyiv

Senior career*
Years	Team	Apps	(Gls)
2013–2015	FC Illichivets Mariupol	5	(0)
2016–	FC Sumy	27	(2)
- * Club domestic league appearances and goals as of 1 January 2017

Bohdan Sukhodub (Ukrainian: Богдан Володимирович Суходуб; born 9 February 1994), is a professional Ukrainian football defender who plays for FC Sumy in the Ukrainian First League.

He is product of FC FC Frunzenets Sumy sportive school.

He made his début for FC Illichivets Mariupol in the Ukrainian Premier League on 19 October 2014.
