= Kamil Khuchbarov =

Ukrainian footballer

Personal information
- Full name: Kamil Hasanovych Khuchbarov
- Date of birth: 28 August 1999 (age 27)
- Place of birth: Dnipropetrovsk, Ukraine
- Height: 1.75 m (5 ft 9 in)
- Position: Midfielder

Youth career
- 2013–2016: Dnipro Dnipropetrovsk

Senior career*
Years	Team	Apps	(Gls)
2016–2017	Dnipro	0	(0)
2017–2019	Dnipro-1	22	(2)
2018	→ Inhulets Petrove (loan)	7	(0)
2019	Kolos Kovalivka	0	(0)
2020	VPK-Ahro Shevchenkivka	0	(0)
2021	Bukovyna Chernivtsi	7	(1)

International career^{‡}
2017	Ukraine U18	2	(0)
- * Club domestic league appearances and goals as of 10 July 2021 ‡ National team caps and goals as of 27 February 2020

Kamil Khuchbarov (Ukrainian: Каміль Гасанович Хучбаров; born 28 August 1999) is a professional Ukrainian football midfielder.

== Career ==
Khuchbarov is a product of the FC Dnipro Youth Sportive School system. In March 2017 he was promoted to the main-team squad of FC Dnipro, but never made his debut in the Ukrainian Premier League.

In June 2017 he joined the new created SC Dnipro-1 and made his debut for this club in the winning match against FC Metalist 1925 Kharkiv on 15 July 2017 in the Ukrainian Second League as a substituted player.
