= Oleksandr Kosevych =

Ukrainian footballer and coach (1965–2025)

Personal information
- Full name: Oleksandr Oleksandrovych Kosevych
- Date of birth: 4 September 1965
- Place of birth: Donetsk, Ukrainian SSR, USSR
- Date of death: 10 April 2025 (aged 59)

Senior career*
Years	Team	Apps	(Gls)
1992–1994	Harant Donetsk	6	(0)

Managerial career
- 1990–1992: Shakhtar Donetsk (board of directors)
- 1992–1995: Harant Donetsk (president)
- 1996–1999: Metalurh Donetsk (president)
- 2003–2005: Kryvbas Kryvyi Rih (sports director)
- 2004–2007: Kryvbas Kryvyi Rih
- 2007–2008: Zorya Luhansk
- 2016–2020: Avanhard Kramatorsk
- * Club domestic league appearances and goals

Oleksandr Kosevych (Ukrainian: Олександр Олександрович Косевич; 4 September 1965 – 10 April 2025) was a Ukrainian football player and coach.

Kosevych died on 10 April 2025, at the age of 59.
