= Dmytro Bohachov =

Ukrainian footballer (1992–2024)

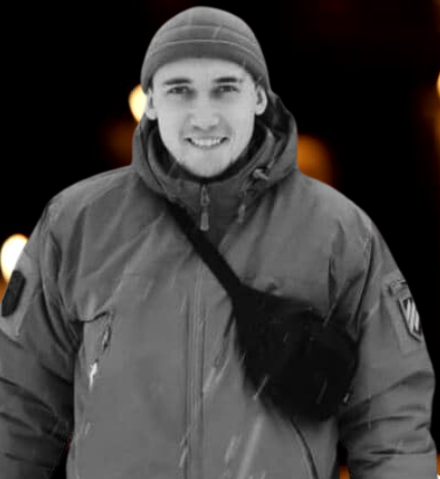

Personal information
- Full name: Dmytro Ivanovych Bohachov
- Date of birth: 25 August 1992
- Place of birth: Sumy, Ukraine
- Date of death: 22 October 2024 (aged 32)
- Place of death: Sumy, Ukraine
- Height: 1.75 m (5 ft 9 in)
- Position: Midfielder

Youth career
- 2009: Youth Sportive School Zmina Sumy

Senior career*
Years	Team	Apps	(Gls)
2010–2018	Sumy	184+	(26+)
2018–2019	FC Viktoriya Sumy		
2019–2020	Sumy		
2020–2021	FC Trostianets		
2021–2022	Orlęta Radzyń Podlaski		

International career
2012	Ukraine U20	1	(0)
- * Club domestic league appearances and goals

Dmytro Bohachov (Ukrainian: Дмитро Іванович Богачов; 25 August 1992 – 22 October 2024) was a Ukrainian football midfielder who played for PFC Sumy.

== Career ==
Bohachov was a product of the Youth Sportive School Zmina in his native city Sumy.

He played for FC Sumy from 2010 to 2018. During that time, the club was promoted together with his teammates from the Ukrainian Second League to the Ukrainian First League. He then played for FC FC Viktoriya Sumy from 2018-2019 before returning to Sumy in 2019-2020. He would then play a season for FC Trostianets in 2020-2021, before heading to Orlęta Radzyń Podlaski in Poland's fourth division.

== Military service ==
Bohachov joined the Armed Forces of Ukraine following the Russian invasion in 2022. He fought in the Battle of Avdiivka and also served as a combat medic.

== Death ==
Bohachov died while undergoing treatment from wounds sustained in action at a hospital in Sumy during the Russo-Ukrainian War, on 22 October 2024. He was 32.
