= Yevhen Santrapynskykh =

Ukrainian footballer

Personal information
- Full name: Yevhen Kostyantynovych Santrapynskykh
- Date of birth: 21 October 1987 (age 39)
- Place of birth: Illichivsk, Ukrainian SSR
- Height: 1.74 m (5 ft 8 1/2 in)
- Position: Midfielder

Youth career
- 2000–2002: Illichivets Illichivsk
- 2002: Lokomotyv Kharkiv
- 2003–2005: Illichivets Illichivsk

Senior career*
Years	Team	Apps	(Gls)
2005–2009	Metalurh Zaporizhzhia	7	(1)
2005–2006	→ Metalurh-2 Zaporizhzhia	15	(1)
2009–2010	Bastion Illichivsk	18	(10)
2010–2013	Bukovyna Chernivtsi	89	(13)
2014	Tavriya Simferopol	8	(0)
2014	Naftan Novopolotsk	13	(1)
2015	Stal Dniprodzerzhynsk	11	(0)
2015–2016	Hirnyk Kryvyi Rih	18	(0)
2016	Mykolaiv	0	(0)
2017	Sumy	3	(0)
2018–2019	Hirnyk Kryvyi Rih	19	(2)
2019	Bukovyna Chernivtsi	19	(1)
- * Club domestic league appearances and goals as of 31 December 2019

Yevhen Santrapynskykh (Ukrainian: Євген Костянтинович Сантрапинських; born 21 October 1987) is a Ukrainian former professional football midfielder.

== Career ==
Yevhen Santrapynskykh is a product of Bastion Illichivsk school system, in Odesa Oblast. He made his debut for the Metalurh Zaporizhzhia senior team on 10 June 2007, during the Ukrainian Premier League home match against rival FC Kharkiv, which Metalurh club won 3:1.
