= Vitaliy Havrysh =

Ukrainian footballer

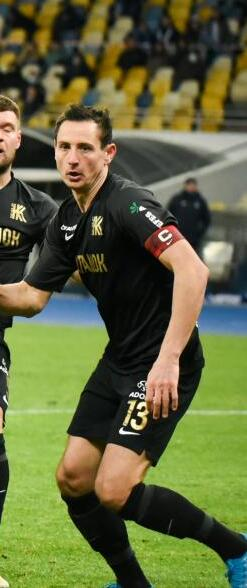

Personal information
- Full name: Vitaliy Volodymyrovych Havrysh
- Date of birth: 18 March 1986 (age 40)
- Place of birth: Chernihiv, Soviet Union
- Height: 1.82 m (6 ft 0 in)
- Position: Midfielder

Team information
- Current team: Kolos Kovalivka (assistant)

Youth career
- 1999–2003: SDYuShOR Desna

Senior career*
Years	Team	Apps	(Gls)
2003–2006	Desna Chernihiv	74	(17)
2007	Stal Alchevsk	13	(1)
2007–2012	Metalurh Donetsk	2	(0)
2008–2011	→ Stal Alchevsk (loan)	102	(21)
2012–2013	Oleksandriya	23	(2)
2013–2015	Metalurh Zaporizhzhia	44	(1)
2015–2016	Hoverla Uzhhorod	12	(0)
2016	Zirka Kropyvnytskyi	6	(0)
2016–2021	Kolos Kovalivka	124	(16)
Total		400	(58)

International career
2005	Ukraine U19		

Managerial career
- 2021–: Kolos Kovalivka (assistant)
- * Club domestic league appearances and goals

Vitaliy Volodymyrovych Havrysh (Ukrainian: Віталій Володимирович Гавриш; born 18 March 1986) is a Ukrainian retired professional footballer who played as a defender.

== Career ==
=== Desna Chernihiv ===
Havrysh is the product of the FC Desna Chernihiv School System. He started his professional career on 18 May 2003 in FC Desna Chernihiv, coming on as a substitute in the match against Dniprodzerzhynsk's Stal. Together with the team, Gavrish became the second in his group of the Second League twice in a row (in 2004 and 2005), although only the winners of the groups rose in the class. In addition, in 2005 he was called up to the location of the national teams of Ukraine-18 and Ukraine-19, but did not go on the field. Only on the third attempt, in 2006, Chernihiv managed to win their group and reach the First League. Here he won the Ukrainian Second League in the season 2005–06 and to get promoted to Ukrainian First League.

=== Metalurh Donetsk and Stal Alchevsk ===
In early 2007, Vitaliy moved to Metalurh Donetsk, but was immediately leased to Stal Alchevsk, which played in the Ukrainian Premier League and finished 15th in that season and relegated to the Ukrainian First League. Vitaliy Havrysh started the next season for Metalurh Donetsk, but in a year the midfielder played only 2 matches for the main team in the championship and 2 in the cup (1 goal), most of the time playing in the doubles tournament (28 matches, 3 goals).

==== Loan to Stal Alchevsk ====
In summer 2008, Gavrish returned to Stal Alchevsk, having played in 30 matches in Ukrainian First League with 4 goals, during the season 2008–09 Ukrainian First League season. He played for FC Hoverla Uzhhorod., but was returned to Metalurh at the end of the season. But after playing only a few control matches and one backup match, in August of that year he again went to "Steel", where he became captain of the team.

=== Oleksandriya ===
In 2012 he returned in Ukrainian Premier League Premier League, moving to Oleksandria. On 3 March 2012, he made his debut for Oleksandriya in a match against Lutsk's Volyn. On 8 April 2012, he scored his first goal for Oleksandriya in a match against Kryvyi Rih's Kryvbas, which won. Together with the club he flew from the Premier League to the First League, where he spent another six months.

=== Metalurh Zaporizhzhia ===
On 2 February 2013 he moved to Metalurh Zaporizhzhia. On 2 March 2013, he made his debut for Metalurh Zaporizhya in a match against Illichivets. In the game against the same team on 7 December 2014, Gavrish scored the first goal for the club. In summer 2015, along with seven other players, he left Metalurh Zaporizhya as a free agent.

=== Zirka Kropyvnytskyi ===
On 27 June 2016 he became a player of Zirka Kropyvnytskyi.

=== Kolos Kovalivka ===
On 29 September 2016 of the same year he signed a contract with Kolos Kovalivka. In Ukrainian First League in the season 2018-19 he played 27 matches and scored 8 goals. Havrysh become the captain of FC Kolos Kovalivka and he was recognized as the best player of May 2019 in the Ukrainian First League. With the club in the season 2020-21, he manage to get 4 place in Ukrainian Premier League and qualified for the Europa Conference League third qualifying round. On 19 December 2021 he announced his retirement from football.

== Career statistics ==
=== Club ===
As of match played 16 November 2021

Appearances and goals by club, season and competition
Club	Season	League			Cup		Europe		Other		Total	
Club	Season	Division	Apps	Goals	Apps	Goals	Apps	Goals	Apps	Goals	Apps	Goals
Desna Chernihiv	2002-03	Ukrainian Second League	1	0	0	0	0	0	0	0	1	0
Desna Chernihiv	2003–04	Ukrainian Second League	11	2	1	0	0	0	0	0	12	2
Desna Chernihiv	2003–04	Ukrainian Second League	26	3	3	0	0	0	0	0	29	3
Desna Chernihiv	2005–06	Ukrainian Second League	25	9	1	0	0	0	0	0	26	9
Desna Chernihiv	2006–07	Ukrainian First League	19	5	2	0	0	0	0	0	21	5
Stal Alchevsk	2006–07	Vyshcha Liha	13	1	0	0	0	0	0	0	0	0
Metalurh Donetsk	2007–08	Vyshcha Liha	2	0	2	1	0	0	0	0	4	1
Stal Alchevsk	2008–09	Ukrainian First League	0	0	0	0	0	0	0	0	0	0
Metalurh Donetsk	2009-10	Ukrainian Premier League	0	0	0	0	0	0	0	0	0	0
Stal Alchevsk	2009–10	Ukrainian Premier League	30	2	3	1	0	0	0	0	32	2
Stal Alchevsk	2010–11	Ukrainian Premier League	32	10	2	0	0	0	0	0	34	10
Stal Alchevsk	2011–12	Ukrainian First League	19	6	0	0	0	0	0	0	19	6
Oleksandria	2012–13	Ukrainian First League	20	1	1	0	0	0	0	0	21	1
Oleksandria	2013–14	Ukrainian First League	10	1	0	0	0	0	0	0	10	1
Metalurh Zaporizhya	2013–14	Ukrainian Premier League	10	1	1	0	0	0	0	0	11	1
Metalurh Zaporizhya	2014–15	Ukrainian Premier League	24	0	2	0	0	0	0	0	26	0
Metalurh Zaporizhya	2015–16	Ukrainian Premier League	10	0	0	0	0	0	0	0	10	0
Hoverla Uzhhorod	2015–16	Ukrainian Premier League	12	0	0	0	0	0	0	0	12	0
Zirka Kropyvnytskyi	2016–17	Ukrainian Premier League	6	0	0	0	0	0	0	0	6	0
Kolos Kovalivka	2016–17	Ukrainian First League	21	3	0	0	0	0	0	0	21	3
Kolos Kovalivka	2017–18	Ukrainian First League	31	0	1	1	0	0	0	0	32	1
Kolos Kovalivka	2018–19	Ukrainian First League	28	9	2	2	0	0	0	0	30	11
Kolos Kovalivka	2019–20	Ukrainian Premier League	20	3	0	0	0	0	0	0	20	3
Kolos Kovalivka	2020–21	Ukrainian Premier League	18	1	1	0	2	0	0	0	21	1
Kolos Kovalivka	2021–22	Ukrainian Premier League	6	0	0	0	1	0	0	0	7	0
Career total			0	0	0	0	0	0	0	0	0	0

== Honours ==
Kolos Kovalivka

- Ukrainian First League: 2018–19

Desna Chernihiv

- Ukrainian Second League: 2005–06

Individual

- Best Player in May 2019 Ukrainian First League: 2018–19
