= Vasyl Pynyashko =

Ukrainian footballer

Personal information
- Full name: Vasyl Illich Pynyashko
- Date of birth: 2 February 1992 (age 34)
- Place of birth: Uzhhorod, Ukraine
- Height: 1.64 m (5 ft 5 in)
- Position: Midfielder

Youth career
- 2005–2009: Youth Sportive School Uzhhorod

Senior career*
Years	Team	Apps	(Gls)
2009–2011	Zakarpattia Uzhhorod	0	(0)
2011–2012	Uzhhorod	?	(?)
2012–2013	Mukacheve	?	(?)
2013–2014	Serednye	?	(?)
2015–2016	Uzhhorod	23	(16)
2016–2017	Sobrance	8	(3)
2017–2021	Mynai	90	(9)
2021	Uzhhorod	20	(0)
2022	Kazincbarcikai	14	(2)
2023–	Dynamo Toronto		
- * Club domestic league appearances and goals as of 15 May 2022

Vasyl Illich Pynyashko (Ukrainian: Василь Ілліч Пиняшко; Hungarian: Pinyaskó László; born 2 February 1992) is a Ukrainian professional football midfielder who plays with the FC Dynamo Toronto.

He also holds Hungarian citizenship.

== Club career ==
=== Early career ===
Born in Uzhhorod, Pynyashko was a product of the local Youth Sportive School.

He played two seasons for Zakarpattia Uzhhorod in the Ukrainian Premier League Reserves, but never made his debut for the senior squad. After playing in the local amateur league with various clubs, he spent a short time abroad in the Slovak circuit with Sobrance-Sobranecko.

=== Ukraine ===
Pynyashko returned to his home country in 2017 to sign with Mynai in the national amateur circuit. In his debut season with Mynai, he helped the club secure promotion to the professional third division by winning their group. He would re-sign with Mynai for the following season and assisted the club in once again securing promotion by winning their group. In his debut season in the professional circuit, he appeared in 26 matches and scored 3 goals. In the 2019-2020 season, he would help Mynai secure another promotion this time to the premier league by winning the league championship.

He was re-signed by the organization when they played in the premier league. He made his debut in the Ukrainian Premier League for Mynai on 13 September 2020, playing as the start squad player in a winning home match against FC Oleksandriya. In his debut season in the top tier level, he appeared in 22 matches and recorded 2 goals. After the conclusion of the season, he departed from Mynai.

Pynyashko left Mynai after four seasons in the summer of 2021 to rejoin his former club Uzhhorod in the Ukrainian second division. In his single season with Uzhhorod, he appeared in 20 matches and left the club after the year's conclusion.

=== Hungary ===
After a single season with Uzhhorod, he departed the club in 2022 to play in the Hungarian third division with Kazincbarcikai.

=== Canada ===
In the summer of 2023, he had another spell abroad in the Canadian Soccer League with the FC Dynamo Toronto. Pynyashko would record a goal against Weston United in his debut match on May 28, 2023. He would help the club in finishing fourth in the standings.

== Career statistics ==
=== Club ===
As of match played 12 May 2021

Appearances and goals by club, season and competition
Club	Season	League			Cup		Continental		Other		Total	
Club	Season	Division	Apps	Goals	Apps	Goals	Apps	Goals	Apps	Goals	Apps	Goals
Mynai	2017–18	Ukrainian Football Amateur League	13	1	0	0	0	0	13	8	26	9
Mynai	2018–19	Ukrainian Second League	26	3	4	1	0	0	0	0	30	4
Mynai	2019–20	Ukrainian First League	29	3	5	0	0	0	0	0	34	3
Mynai	2020–21	Ukrainian Premier League	22	2	2	0	0	0	0	0	24	2
Mynai	Total		90	9	11	1	0	0	13	8	114	18
Career total			90	9	11	1	0	0	13	8	114	18

== Honours ==
Mynai

- Ukrainian First League: 2019–20
- Ukrainian Second League Group A: 2018–19
- Ukrainian Amateur Football Championship Group 1: 2017–18
