= Serhiy Romanov =

Ukrainian footballer (born 1997)

Personal information
- Full name: Serhiy Serhiyovych Romanov
- Date of birth: 21 July 1997 (age 29)
- Place of birth: Popasna, Ukraine
- Height: 1.78 m (5 ft 10 in)
- Position: Left midfielder

Team information
- Current team: Prykarpattia Ivano-Frankivsk
- Number: 69

Youth career
- 2010–2012: LVUFK Luhansk
- 2012–2014: Zorya Luhansk

Senior career*
Years	Team	Apps	(Gls)
2013–201	Zorya Luhansk	0	(0)
2016–2020	Metalist 1925 Kharkiv	101	(15)
2020–2021	Metal Kharkiv	6	(0)
2021	→ Hirnyk-Sport Horishni Plavni (loan)	9	(3)
2021–2022	Hirnyk-Sport Horishni Plavni	17	(0)
2023	Hirnyk-Sport Horishni Plavni	8	(1)
2023–	Prykarpattia Ivano-Frankivsk	20	(0)
- * Club domestic league appearances and goals as of 24 December 2025

Serhiy Serhiyovych Romanov (Ukrainian: Сергій Сергійович Романов; born 21 July 1997) is a Ukrainian footballer who plays as a left midfielder for Prykarpattia Ivano-Frankivsk.

== Career ==
Originally admitted to Zorya Luhansk as the product of Luhansk sports schools, until 2016 he played for the club's youth squads in the Ukrainian Premier League youth competitions. In 2016, Romanov joined the newly formed FC Metalist 1925 Kharkiv.

On 2 November 2018, Romanov was recognized as the player of month for October by PFL.
