= Bohdan Deneha =

Ukrainian footballer

Personal information
- Full name: Bohdan Ihorovych Deneha
- Date of birth: 10 June 1996 (age 30)
- Height: 1.87 m (6 ft 1 1/2 in)
- Positions: Midfielder; striker

Youth career
- 2009–2010: Nika Ivano-Frankivsk
- 2012–2013: YFS Dynamo Kyiv

Senior career*
Years	Team	Apps	(Gls)
2013–2014	Kalush (Amateur)		
2015	Veres Rivne	7	(2)
2016	Karpaty Lviv	0	(0)
2016–2017	Prykarpattia Ivano-Frankivsk	22	(2)
2018	Kalush	6	(0)
- * Club domestic league appearances and goals as of 24 November 2018

Bohdan Deneha (Ukrainian: Богдан Ігорович Денега; born 10 June 1996) is a professional Ukrainian football striker.

== Club career ==
=== Youth years ===
Deneha is the product of the FC Nika Ivano-Frankivsk and YFS Dynamo Kyiv of Valeriy Lobanovsky School Systems. From 2013 until 2014 Deneha played for FC Kalush at the Amateur level.

=== FC Veres Rivne ===
He made his professional debut for FC Veres Rivne in a game against FC Arsenal Kyiv on 5 September 2015 in Ukrainian Second League.

=== FC Karpaty Lviv ===
In February 2016, Deneha joined FC Karpaty Lviv.

=== FC Teplovyk Ivano-Frankivsk ===
In July 2016, Bohdan joined FC Teplovyk Ivano-Frankivsk.

== Career statistics ==
As of 9 November 2016

Club	Season	League			Cup		Total	
Club	Season	Division	Apps	Goals	Apps	Goals	Apps	Goals
FC Veres Rivne	2015–16	Second League	7	2	0	0	7	2
FC Karpaty Lviv	2015–16	Premier League	0	0	0	0	0	0
FC Teplovyk Ivano-Frankivsk	2016–17	Second League	12	1	0	0	12	1
Total			19	3	0	0	19	3
