= Oleksiy Shpak =

Ukrainian footballer

Personal information
- Full name: Oleksiy Anatoliyovych Shpak
- Date of birth: 15 August 1998 (age 28)
- Place of birth: Chop, Ukraine
- Height: 1.86 m (6 ft 1 in)
- Position: Midfielder

Team information
- Current team: Epitsentr Dunaivtsi
- Number: 18

Youth career
- 2010–2011: Dynamo Khmelnytskyi
- 2011–2013: BRW-VIK Volodymyr-Volynskyi
- 2013–2015: Podillya Khmelnytskyi

Senior career*
Years	Team	Apps	(Gls)
2015–2016	Hoverla Uzhhorod	0	(0)
2016	Spartakus Uzhhorod	5	(0)
2016–	Mynai	79	(3)
2020	→ Podillya Khmelnytskyi (loan)	0	(0)
2021–	→ Epitsentr Dunaivtsi (loan)	0	(0)
- * Club domestic league appearances and goals as of 22 April 2021

Oleksiy Anatoliyovych Shpak (Ukrainian: Олексій Анатолійович Шпак; born 15 August 1998) is a Ukrainian professional football midfielder who plays on loan for FC Epitsentr Dunaivtsi from Mynai.

== Career ==
Born in Chop, but growing up in Khmelnytskyi, Shpak is a product of the local youth sportive school system, and also of the BRW-VIK from Volodymyr-Volynskyi.

He played one season for Hoverla Uzhhorod in the Ukrainian Premier League Reserves, but never made his debut for the senior squad. After playing in the local amateur clubs, in September 2016 Shpak signed contract with FC Mynai and in 2020 was promoted with his teammates into the Ukrainian Premier League. He made his debut in the Ukrainian Premier League for Mynai on 20 September 2020, playing as the second half-time substituted player in a losing away match against FC Olimpik Donetsk.
