= Andriy Tlumak =

Ukrainian footballer (born 1979)

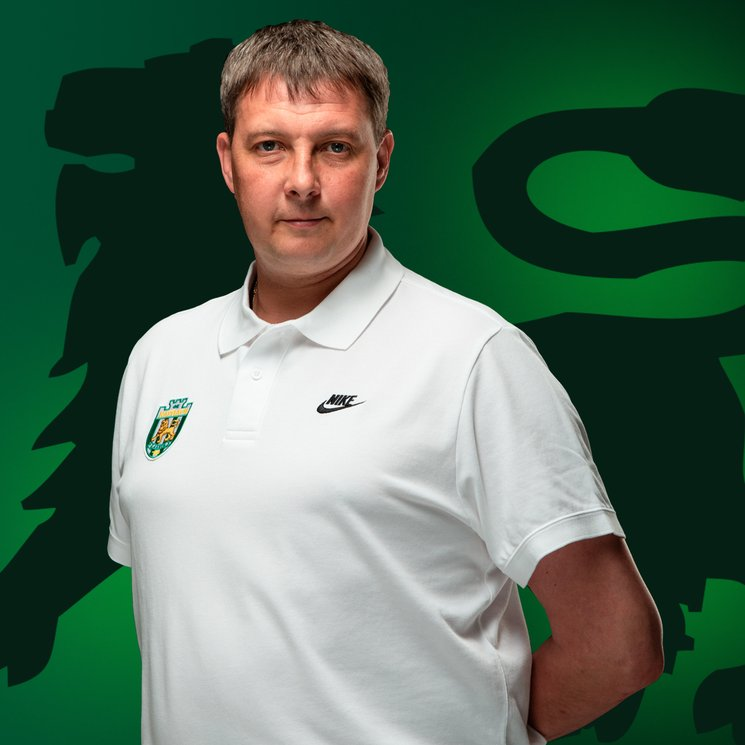

Personal information
- Date of birth: 7 March 1979 (age 47)
- Place of birth: Stryi, Ukrainian SSR, Soviet Union
- Height: 1.88 m (6 ft 2 in)
- Position: Goalkeeper

Senior career*
Years	Team	Apps	(Gls)
1996–1997	Hazovyk Komarno	21	(0)
1997–2007	Karpaty Lviv	91	(0)
1997–2007	→ Karpaty-2 Lviv	81	(0)
2001–2004	→ Halychyna-Karpaty Lviv	4	(0)
2005	→ Metalurh Zaporizhya (loan)	10	(0)
2007–2008	Metalist Kharkiv	7	(0)
2008–2009	Zorya Luhansk	12	(0)
2009–2012	Karpaty Lviv	15	(0)
Total		341	(0)

Managerial career
- 2012–2013: Karpaty Lviv (U19 assistant)
- 2014–2015: Karpaty Lviv (U19)
- 2016: Karpaty Lviv (U21)
- 2016–2017: Karpaty Lviv (assistant)
- 2017–2018: Karpaty Lviv (U19)
- 2018–2020: Volyn Lutsk
- 2020–2023: Karpaty Lviv
- * Club domestic league appearances and goals

Andriy Tlumak (born 7 March 1979) is a Ukrainian football manager and former player.

== Career ==
Andriy Tlumak started his football career in Lviv, Ukraine, playing in the local football academy. He made his professional debut at local club Karpaty Lviv, where later he spent most of his career. After several seasons at Karpaty, Tlumak secured the starting position in goal and was even considered for Ukraine national team, but due to high competition he has not made a debut yet. For a brief time in 2005, Tlumak was loaned to Metalurh Zaporizhya, however unable to impress the club he returned to Lviv.

In the summer of 2007, it was announced that Tlumak has signed a contract with one of the leaders of Ukrainian Premier League, Metalist Kharkiv, he has remained there since.

Until 2012, Tlumak was playing in the position of goalkeeper for former club Karpaty Lviv.

== Personal life ==
His older son, Yuriy (born 2002) is also a professional football player, and younger, Maksym (born 2008) now is attached to the FC Karpaty Lviv youth sport school.
