= Andriy Horban =

Ukrainian footballer and coach

Personal information
- Full name: Andriy Pavlovych Horban
- Date of birth: 21 March 1978 (age 48)
- Place of birth: Pervomaiskyi, Kharkiv Oblast, Ukrainian SSR
- Height: 1.73 m (5 ft 8 in)
- Position: Midfielder

Team information
- Current team: FC Zirka Kropyvnytskyi (manager)

Youth career
- Spartak Kharkiv

Senior career*
| Years | Team | Apps | (Gls) |
| 1997–1999 | FC Zirka Kirovohrad | 5 | (0) |
| 1997–1999 | → FC Zirka-2 Kirovohrad (loan) | 40 | (3) |
| 1999 | → Turan-Tovuz IK (loan) | 8 | (0) |
| 1999–2000 | FC Metalurh Nikopol | 27 | (2) |
| 2000–2004 | FC Zirka Kirovohrad | 113 | (7) |
| 2004 | → Olimpiya FC AES (loan) | 1 | (0) |
| 2004–2006 | FC Zorya Luhansk | 42 | (2) |
| 2004–2006 | → FC Zorya-2 Luhansk (loan) | 4 | (0) |
| 2006 | PFC Oleksandriya | 7 | (0) |
| 2007 | FC Zirka Kirovohrad | 6 | (1) |
| 2007 | FC Sevastopol | 2 | (0) |
| 2007–2008 | FC Nyva Ternopil | 9 | (1) |
| 2008 | FC Olimpik Kirovohrad | 1 | (0) |
| 2008 | FC Yednist Plysky | 6 | (0) |
| 2011–2012 | FC Lokomotyv Znamianka | 11 | (1) |
| 2018 | FC Inhul-Ahro-Lend | 2 | (0) |

Managerial career
- 2009–2017: FC Zirka Kropyvnytskyi (academy)
- 2017–2018: Zirka U-19
- 2018–: FC Zirka Kropyvnytskyi
- * Club domestic league appearances and goals

Andriy Horban (Ukrainian: Андрій Павлович Горбань; born 21 March 1978) is a Ukrainian professional football coach and a former player.

== Career ==
Horban after retiring as footballer stayed in Kirovohrad Oblast and became a manager within FC Zirka Kropyvnytskyi.

Before becoming a head coach of Zirka, he was coaching its under-19 team in Ukrainian Premier League.
