= Oleksandr Oliynyk =

Ukrainian football coach (born 1987)

Personal information
- Full name: Oleksandr Mykolayovych Oliynyk
- Date of birth: 31 October 1987 (age 38)
- Place of birth: Izmail, Ukrainian SSR
- Height: 1.81 m (5 ft 11 in)
- Position: Midfielder

Team information
- Current team: PFC Sumy (acting manager)

Youth career
- 2001: RVUFK Kyiv
- 2003–2004: DYuSSh Izmail
- 2006: Viktoriya Uzyn

Senior career*
Years	Team	Apps	(Gls)
2005–2008	FC Ros Bila Tserkva	91	(10)
2009	FC Dacia Chișinău	4	(0)
2009–2010	FC Metalurh Donetsk	0	(0)
2010–2011	FC Desna Chernihiv	19	(3)
2012	FC Krystal Kherson	12	(0)
2013	FC Olimpik Donetsk	8	(0)
2013	FC Enerhiya Mykolaiv	20	(2)
2014–2015	FC Helios Kharkiv	12	(0)
2015	FC Okean Kerch	1	(0)
2017–2018	FC Enerhetyk Solonytsivka	28	(4)

Managerial career
- 2018: FC Kobra Kharkiv (acting)
- 2019: PFC Sumy (acting)
- * Club domestic league appearances and goals

Oleksandr Oliynyk (Ukrainian: Олександр Миколайович Олійник; born 31 October 1987) is a Ukrainian professional football coach and former player.

== Career ==
In 2015 Oliynyk played at least one game as a defender under the name of Oleynik for the Russian club Okean Kerch (previously competing in Ukrainian competitions), a member of the CPL.

After retiring as footballer Oliynyk became a manager of FC Kobra Kharkiv.
