= Vitaliy Boyko =

Ukrainian footballer (born 1997)

Personal information
- Full name: Vitaliy Volodymyrovych Boyko
- Date of birth: 3 December 1997 (age 28)
- Place of birth: Voznesenske, Cherkasy Oblast, Ukraine
- Height: 1.83 m (6 ft 0 in)
- Position: Attacking midfielder

Team information
- Current team: Veres Rivne
- Number: 18

Youth career
- 2009–2014: Youth Sportive School Cherkasy

Senior career*
Years	Team	Apps	(Gls)
2014–2015	Zorya-Cherkaskyi Dnipro-2	8	(1)
2016	Umanfermmash Uman	11	(1)
2016–2017	Cherkaskyi Dnipro-2	29	(0)
2017–2019	Cherkashchyna	40	(11)
2020–2021	Sant Rafel	3	(0)
2021	Mynai	8	(0)
2021	Kremin Kremenchuk	18	(3)
2022	Volyn Lutsk	0	(0)
2022–2023	Lviv	13	(1)
2023–2025	LNZ Cherkasy	45	(4)
2025–	Veres Rivne	28	(5)
- * Club domestic league appearances and goals as of 3 June 2026

Vitaliy Volodymyrovych Boyko (Ukrainian: Віталій Володимирович Бойко; born 3 December 1997) is a Ukrainian professional footballer who plays as an attacking midfielder for Ukrainian club Veres Rivne.

== Career ==
Born in Zolotonosha Raion, Boyko is a product of the local Youth Sportive School.

After playing in a local amateur and lower leagues clubs, he spent a 1 year as player in the Tercera División CF Sant Rafel and in March 2021 Boyko returned to Ukraine and signed a contract with FC Mynai from the Ukrainian Premier League. He made his debut in the Ukrainian Premier League for Mynai on 13 March 2021, playing as the second half-time substituted player in a losing home match against FC Inhulets Petrove. In January 2023 he signed for LNZ Cherkasy.
