= Vitaliy Romanyuk =

Hungarian-born Ukrainian footballer

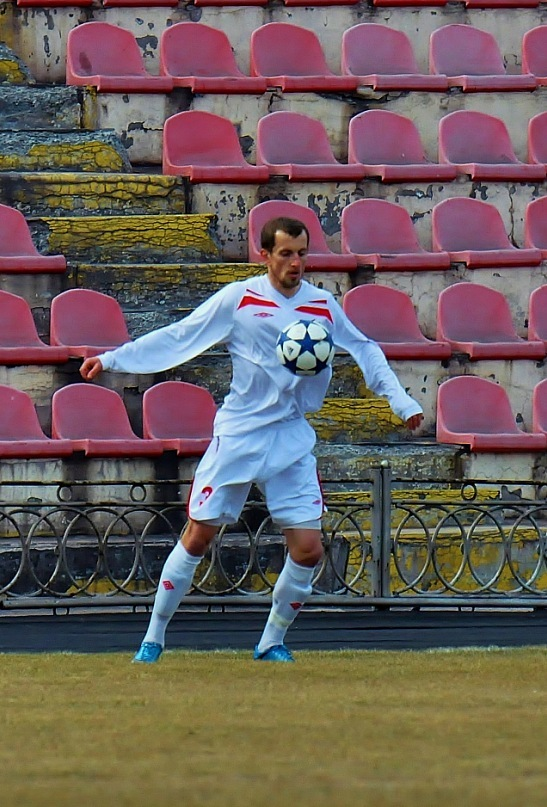

Personal information
- Full name: Vitaliy Viktorovych Romanyuk
- Date of birth: 22 February 1984 (age 42)
- Place of birth: Keszthely, Hungary
- Height: 1.81 m (5 ft 11 in)
- Position: Right-back

Team information
- Current team: LNZ Cherkasy (fitness coach)

Youth career
- 1999–2001: LDUFK Lviv

Senior career*
| Years | Team | Apps | (Gls) |
| 2001–2004 | Halychyna-Karpaty Lviv | 67 | (1) |
| 2003–2005 | Karpaty-2 Lviv | 36 | (0) |
| 2005 | Karpaty Lviv | 2 | (0) |
| 2006 | Hazovyk-Skala Stryi | 17 | (0) |
| 2006–2010 | Lviv | 144 | (4) |
| 2011 | Stal Alchevsk | 14 | (0) |
| 2011 | Obolon Kyiv | 11 | (0) |
| 2012 | Stal Alchevsk | 12 | (0) |
| 2012 | Arsenal Bila Tserkva | 18 | (0) |
| 2013–2014 | Nyva Ternopil | 33 | (0) |
| 2014–2017 | Rukh Vynnyky | 75 | (2) |

Managerial career
- 2017–2018: Rukh Vynnyky (fitness coach)
- 2018: Rukh Vynnyky (caretaker)
- 2018–2025: Rukh Lviv (fitness coach)
- 2025–: LNZ Cherkasy (fitness coach)
- * Club domestic league appearances and goals

Vitaliy Viktorovych Romanyuk (Ukrainian: Віталій Вікторович Романюк; born 22 February 1984) is a Ukrainian former professional footballer who played as a right-back and current fitness coach of Rukh Lviv.
