= Levan Koshadze =

Ukrainian footballer

Personal information
- Full name: Levan Koshadze
- Date of birth: 18 January 1993 (age 33)
- Place of birth: Tbilisi, Georgia
- Height: 1.66 m (5 ft 5 1/2 in)
- Position: Midfielder

Team information
- Current team: Cherkashchyna-Akademiya Bilozirya
- Number: 10

Senior career*
Years	Team	Apps	(Gls)
2011–2012	Dila Gori		
2012–2013	Adeli Batumi	16	(8)
2013–2014	Zoria Biloziria	13	(3)
2015	Lokomotyv-Dzhordzhyia Kyiv		
2015–2018	Cherkaskyi Dnipro	49	(5)
2016–2017	→ Kremin Kremenchuk (loan)	31	(5)
2018	Tskhinvali	3	(0)
2019–	Cherkashchyna-Akademiya Bilozirya	0	(0)

International career
- Georgia U-17
- * Club domestic league appearances and goals as of 3 March 2019

Levan Koshadze (Ukrainian: Леван Кошадзе; born 18 January 1993) is a Ukrainian football midfielder who plays for Cherkashchyna-Akademiya Bilozirya.

Koshadze is officially listed as Georgian on a website of the Football Federation of Ukraine, while having a Ukrainian citizenship. He also was allowed to play for the Second League team where foreign players are not allowed.

== Career ==
Koshadze started to play in Georgia, particularly for Adeli Batumi. Since 2013 he lives and plays football in Ukraine. On 20 July 2017 Koshadze was recognized as the best player of the first round in the 2017-18 Ukrainian First League.
