= Oleksandr Medved =

Ukrainian footballer

Personal information
- Full name: Oleksandr Anatoliyovych Medved
- Date of birth: 13 September 1996 (age 30)
- Place of birth: Kyiv, Ukraine
- Height: 1.84 m (6 ft 1/2 in)
- Positions: Defender; midfielder

Team information
- Current team: SC Chaika
- Number: 11

Youth career
- 2003–2013: Obolon-Zmina Kyiv
- 2013: RVUFK Kyiv

Senior career*
Years	Team	Apps	(Gls)
2013	Obolon-Brovar Kyiv	4	(0)
2013–2015	Dnipro Dnipropetrovsk	0	(0)
2015–2016	Chornomorets Odesa	0	(0)
2017	Volyn Lutsk	14	(2)
2018	Helios Kharkiv	1	(0)
2018	Sumy	9	(0)
2019	Cherkashchyna	26	(10)
2020	Kalush	0	(0)
2021–	SC Chaika	13	(0)

International career
2011–2012	Ukraine-16	4	(0)
2011	Ukraine-17	4	(0)
2013–2014	Ukraine-18	7	(0)
- * Club domestic league appearances and goals as of 20:39, 20 June 2021 (UTC)

Oleksandr Medved (Ukrainian: Олександр Анатолійович Медведь; born 13 September 1996) is a professional Ukrainian football defender/midfielder who plays for SC Chaika.

== Career ==
Medved is a product of the FC Obolon-Zmina Kyiv Youth Sportive School System. His first trainer was Sergei Soldatov.

Then he signed a professional contract with FC Dnipro Dnipropetrovsk in the Ukrainian Premier League and subsequently with another Ukrainian Premier League's club FC Chornomorets Odesa. But he played only in the Ukrainian Premier League Reserves and never made his debut for the main-squad teams.
