= 2018–19 Ukrainian Premier League =

28th season of top-tier football league in Vyshcha Liha

Ukrainian Premier League
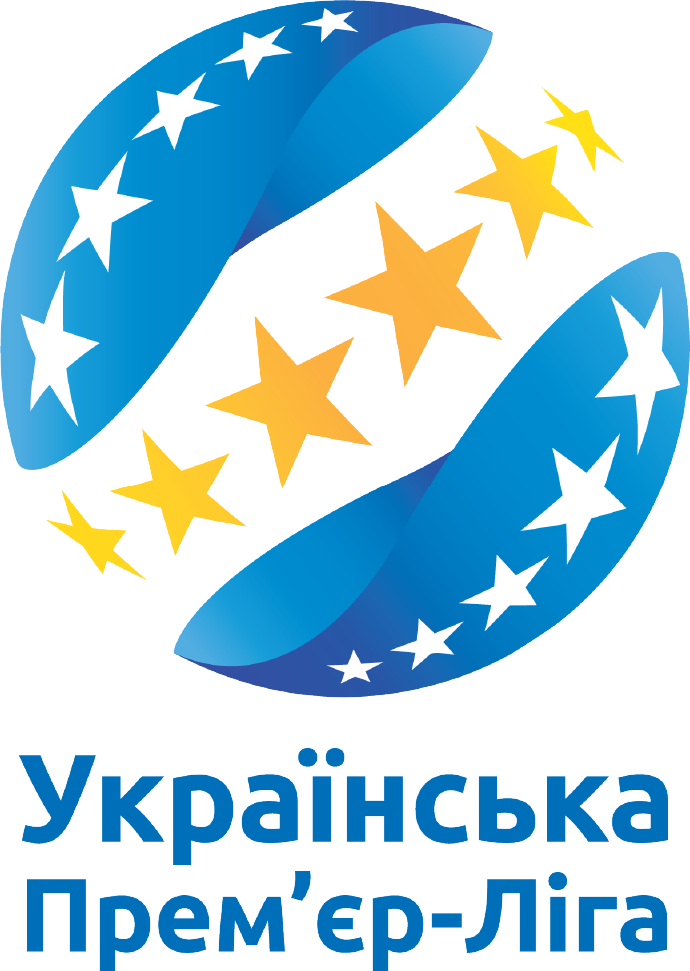
- Official logo
- Season: 2018–19
- Dates: 21 July 2018 – 30 May 2019 (winter break 9 December 2018 – 16 February 2019)
- Champions: Shakhtar Donetsk; 12th title
- Relegated: Arsenal–Kyiv; Chornomorets Odesa
- Champions League: Shakhtar Donetsk; Dynamo Kyiv
- Europa League: FC Oleksandriya; FC Mariupol; Zorya Luhansk
- Matches: 192
- Goals: 474 (2.47 per match)
- Top goalscorer: 19 – Júnior Moraes (Shakhtar)
- Biggest home win: 5:0 – (Dynamo-Zorya, Shakhtar-Karpaty, Shakhtar-Lviv)
- Biggest away win: 0:5 – (Arsenal-Zorya, Chornomorets-Karpaty); 1:6 – (Karpaty-Shakhtar)
- Highest scoring: 2:5 – (Olimpik-Shakhtar); 1:6 – (Karpaty-Shakhtar)
- Longest winning run: 8 – (Dynamo)
- Longest unbeaten run: 29 – (Shakhtar)
- Longest winless run: 12 – (Olimpik)
- Longest losing run: 9 – (Chornomorets)
- Highest attendance: 46,475 – Dynamo–Shakhtar (Round 3)
- Lowest attendance: 0 – Dynamo–Vorskla (Round 1)
- Total attendance: 797,940
- Average attendance: 4156
- All statistics correct as of 15 May 2019.

The 2018–19 Ukrainian Premier League season was the 28th top-level football club competitions since the fall of the Soviet Union and the eleventh since the establishment of the Ukrainian Premier League.

The tournament started on 21 July 2018 and ended on 25 May 2019. The league took its winter intermission after Round 18 on 8 December 2018 and resumed its competition of the Championship with Round 19 on 16 February 2019. The first stage ended with Round 22 games on 17 March 2019. The draw for the second stage was announced for 5 March 2019.

The 11-time winner Shakhtar Donetsk were the two-time defending champions.

== Teams ==
=== Promoted teams ===
- Arsenal Kyiv – the champion of the 2017–18 Ukrainian First League (returning as a phoenix club of previous Arsenal Kyiv after five seasons absence)
- Desna Chernihiv – 3rd place of the 2017–18 Ukrainian First League, play-off winners (debut)

=== Shuffled teams ===
- FC Lviv – a team swap after merging with NK Veres Rivne (returning as a phoenix club of previous FC Lviv after nine seasons absence)

On completion of the 2017–18 Ukrainian Premier League season, Veres Rivne, who had moved their operations to Lviv during the season announced the merging with FC Lviv who competed in the 2017–18 Ukrainian Second League and retain their name. This is the first time of such "swap" that has occurred with a team from the Ukrainian Premier League. Its certification the club passed on 5 June 2018. Along with that the FFU certification committee is consulting with the UEFA in regards of the "clubs swap". On 6 June 2018, it was announced that it is too early speculate composition of the league for the next season as the UEFA will make its final decision by allowing or not participation of FC Lviv. It is possible that some of already relegated clubs might be given a second chance if UEFA will insist on impossibility of the Lviv-Veres team swap. On 12 June 2018, Ukrainian Premier League updated its website removing any mentioning of NK Veres Rivne ever competing in the league and its record being awarded to FC Lviv. Few days later the league recovered the Veres' record. More to the story, in interview to "Tribuna" a head of the FFU Attestation Committee Viktor Bezsmernyi explained that it was Veres that received certificate for the 2018–19 Ukrainian Premier League and then the club changed its name. At same time the old-new president of Veres Khakhlyov demonstrated the club's certificate for the 2018–19 Ukrainian Second League.

=== Withdrawn teams ===
- On 21 June 2018, during the club's conference of FC Poltava, the club's leadership announced that it dissolved the club.

On 22 June 2018, the UPL published an official announcement about situation with FC Poltava, and while shocked with the club's decision the league is confirming that the club is withdrawing and that the league will be seeking its replacement. Following withdrawal of FC Poltava, a crisis has seemed to ripen in the league as there is no other team can replace Poltava due to financing or infrastructure issues. Based on the voting conducted among the UPL members, on 26 June 2018, the league picked FC Chornomorets Odesa for the Poltava's replacement and submitted its selection for approval by the FFU Executive Committee. On 3 July 2018, Chornomorets was officially approved by FFU as 2018–19 Ukrainian Premier League participant.

=== Location map ===
The following displays the location of teams.

Home venues of teams in the 2018–19 Ukrainian Premier League.
Teams in italics are from the conflict zone of the War in Donbas and are playing their home games in different cities.
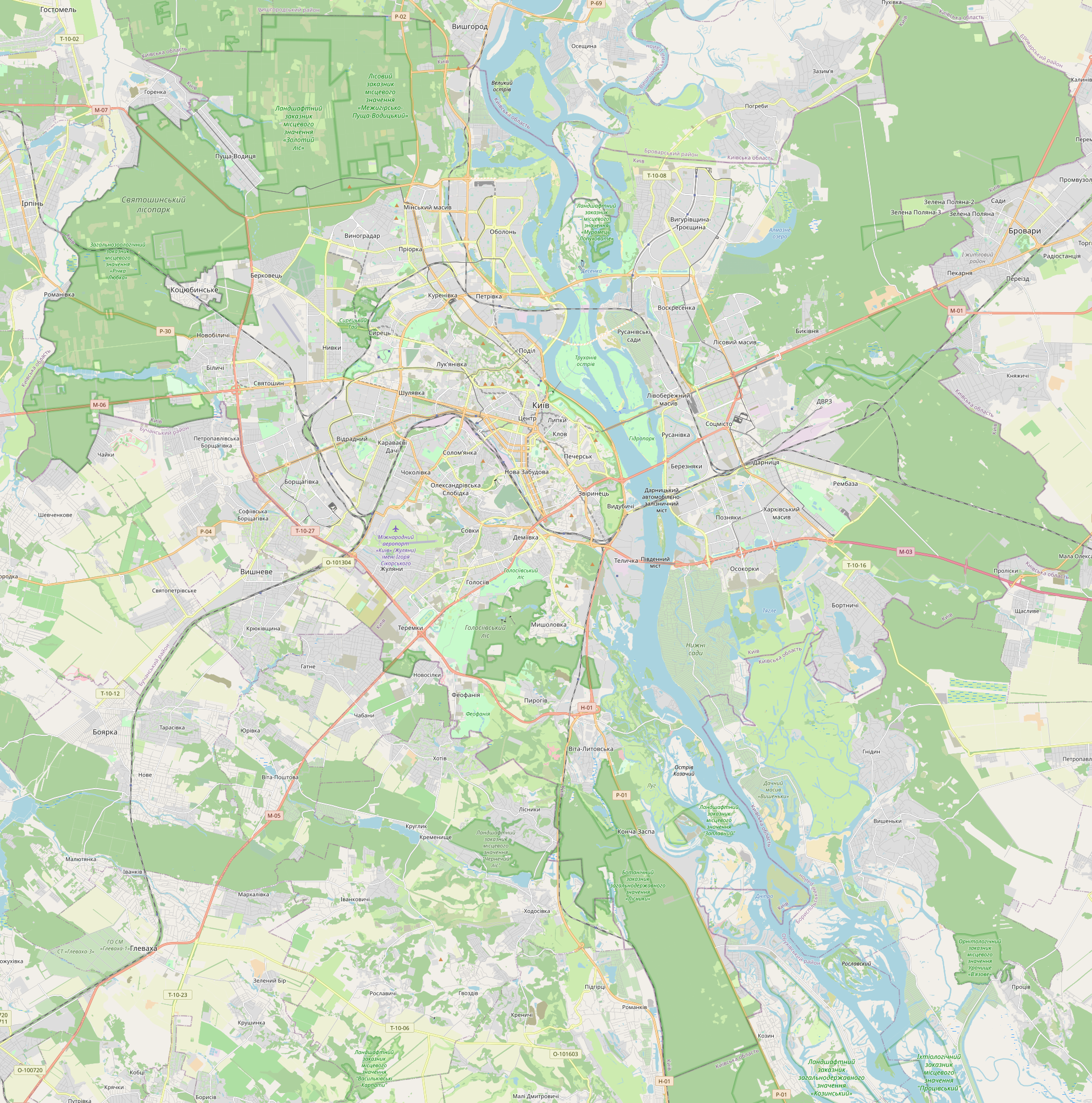
Kyiv city home venues of teams in the League
Lviv city home venues of teams in the League

=== Stadiums ===
Three teams play their matches outside of home towns. The minimum threshold for the stadium's capacity in the UPL is 5,000 (Article 10, paragraph 7.2).

The following stadiums are regarded as home grounds:

Rank	Stadium	Place	Club	Capacity	Notes
1	NSC Olimpiyskiy	Kyiv	Dynamo Kyiv	70,050	
2	OSC Metalist	Kharkiv	Shakhtar Donetsk	40,003	used as home ground during the season.
3	Arena Lviv	Lviv	FC Lviv	34,915	
4	Chornomorets Stadium	Odesa	Chornomorets Odesa	34,164	
5	Ukraina Stadium	Lviv	Karpaty Lviv FC Lviv	28,051	used in Round 5, home ground since Round 19
6	Vorskla Stadium	Poltava	Vorskla Poltava	24,795	
7	Lobanovsky Dynamo Stadium	Kyiv	Olimpik Donetsk Arsenal Kyiv (Note: Originally registering Bannikov Stadium as its main stadium for the season, the club's president Piric informed that at least for next year Arsenal will play at Dynamo Stadium. Bannikov Stadium does not meet all the requirements of UPL.)	16,873	used as home ground during the season.
8	Volodymyr Boiko Stadium	Mariupol	FC Mariupol	12,680	
9	Chernihiv Stadium	Chernihiv	Desna Chernihiv	12,060	
10	Slavutych-Arena	Zaporizhzhia	Zorya Luhansk	12,000	used as home ground during the season.
11	CSC Nika Stadium	Oleksandriya	FC Oleksandriya	7,000	

=== Personnel and sponsorship ===
Team	President	Head coach	Captain	Kit manufacturer	Shirt sponsor
Arsenal Kyiv	Ivica Pirić	(Ukraine) Ihor Leonov	(Ukraine) Serhiy Vakulenko	Zeus	Favorite Sport, Vegeta
Chornomorets Odesa	Leonid Klimov	(Bulgaria) Angel Chervenkov	(Ukraine) Serhiy Litovchenko	Legea	Gefest (Note: The Gefest is a local construction company in Odesa.)
Desna Chernihiv	Volodymyr Levin	(Ukraine) Oleksandr Ryabokon	(Ukraine) Denys Favorov	Nike	Favorite Sport
Dynamo Kyiv	Ihor Surkis	(Belarus) Alyaksandr Khatskevich	(Ukraine) Serhiy Sydorchuk	New Balance	UEFA; No to racism
Karpaty Lviv	Petro Dyminskyi	(Ukraine) Oleksandr Chyzhevskyi (interim)	(Ukraine) Artem Fedetskyi	Joma	Marathonbet, ZIK (Note: The ZIK is a media holding of Petro Dyminskyi.)
FC Lviv	Bohdan Kopytko	(Ukraine) Bohdan Blavatskyi	(Ukraine) Oleksandr Bandura	Legea	Glusco (Note: The Glusco is a regional company of Rosneft in Ukraine owned by Viktor Medvedchuk.)
FC Mariupol	Tariq Mehmood Chaudhry	(Ukraine) Oleksandr Babych	(Ukraine) Rustam Khudzhamov	Nike	Favorite Sport
FC Oleksandriya	Serhiy Kuzmenko	(Ukraine) Volodymyr Sharan	(Ukraine) Andriy Zaporozhan	Nike	UkrAhroKom
Olimpik Donetsk	Vladyslav Helzin	(Ukraine) Ihor Klymovskyi (interim)	(Ukraine) Dmytro Hryshko	Joma	Pari-Match
Shakhtar Donetsk	Rinat Akhmetov	(Portugal) Paulo Fonseca	(Brazil) Taison	Nike	SCM
Vorskla Poltava	Roman Cherniak	(Ukraine) Vitaliy Kosovskyi (interim)	(Ukraine) Volodymyr Chesnakov	adidas	Ferrexpo
Zorya Luhansk	Yevhen Heller	(Ukraine) Yuriy Vernydub	(Ukraine) Mykyta Kamenyuka	Nike	Favorite Sport

=== Managerial changes ===
Team	Outgoing manager	Manner of departure	Date of vacancy	Table	Incoming manager	Date of appointment	Table
FC Lviv	(Ukraine) Andriy Khanas (interim)	Club reorganized (in place of NK Veres Rivne)	unannounced	Pre-season	(Ukraine) Andriy Demchenko (interim)	8 June 2018	Pre-season
Chornomorets Odesa	(Ukraine) Kostyantyn Frolov	Dismissed (w/o details)	13 June 2018	Pre-season	(Bulgaria) Angel Chervenkov	13 June 2018	Pre-season
Arsenal Kyiv	(Ukraine) Serhiy Litovchenko	"Laid off" (Note: On 20 August 2018 in interview to internet newsmedia Footboom Serhiy Litovchenko explained his dismissal from the club pointing out that he still was under contract and will sue the club. On 1 November 2018 the FFU chamber on settling of disagreements fined FC Arsenal-Kyiv and laid a transfer ban onto the club following the case Litovchenko vs FC Arsenal-Kyiv.)	22 June 2018	Pre-season	(Italy) Fabrizio Ravanelli	22 June 2018	Pre-season
FC Lviv	(Ukraine) Andriy Demchenko	End of interim	29 June 2018	Pre-season	(Brazil) Gilmar	3 July 2018	Pre-season
FC Lviv	(Brazil) Gilmar	Resigned (Note: On 13 August 2018 the Football Federation of Ukraine informed the club that Gilmar does not have the UEFA PRO license and therefore cannot be the club's head coach (manager).)	14 August 2018	7th	(Ukraine) Yuriy Bakalov	16 August 2018	7th
Karpaty Lviv	(Ukraine) Oleh Boychyshyn	Sacked	16 August 2018	8th	(Portugal) José Morais	16 August 2018	8th
Arsenal Kyiv	(Italy) Fabrizio Ravanelli	Resigned	22 September 2018	12th	(Ukraine) Vladyslav Humenyuk	22 September 2018	12th
Arsenal Kyiv	(Ukraine) Vladyslav Humenyuk	End of interim	1 October 2018	12th	(Ukraine) Vyacheslav Hroznyi (Note: On 30 November 2018 in interview to Sport Express Hroznyi stated that he does not have a contract with Arsenal, but rather a gentlemen's agreement and expires on 30 November 2018. Soon thereafter FC Arsenal Kyiv made a press-release announcing that Hroznyi's contract is valid until 30 June 2019. Next day Hroznyi explained that the contract actually does exist, but there is the gentlemen's agreement as well and in case of poor financing he will leave club.)	1 October 2018	12th
Olimpik Donetsk	(Ukraine) Roman Sanzhar	Mutual consent	3 October 2018	7th	(Ukraine) Vyacheslav Shevchuk	3 October 2018	7th
Karpaty Lviv	(Portugal) José Morais	Contract terminated (Note: Same day he was appointed as a manager of Jeonbuk Hyundai Motors FC, South Korea (twitter at 19:27 of the Seoul's time).)	28 November 2018	10th	(Ukraine) Oleh Boychyshyn (interim)	28 November 2018	10th
Arsenal Kyiv	(Ukraine) Vyacheslav Hroznyi	Mutual agreement	9 January 2019	12th	(Ukraine) Ihor Leonov	16 January 2019	12th
Karpaty Lviv	(Ukraine) Oleh Boychyshyn	End of interim	13 January 2019	10th	(Spain) Fabri	13 January 2019	10th
Vorskla Poltava	(Ukraine) Vasyl Sachko	Contract terminated	27 March 2019	7th	(Ukraine) Vitaliy Kosovskyi (interim)	28 March 2019	7th
FC Lviv	(Ukraine) Yuriy Bakalov	Mutual consent	8 April 2019	6th	(Ukraine) Taras Hrebenyuk (interim)	8 April 2019	6th
FC Lviv	(Ukraine) Taras Hrebenyuk	End of interim	16 April 2019	5th	(Ukraine) Bohdan Blavatskyi	16 April 2019	5th
Olimpik Donetsk	(Ukraine) Vyacheslav Shevchuk	Mutual consent	17 April 2019	10th	(Ukraine) Ihor Klymovskyi (interim)	17 April 2019	10th
Karpaty Lviv	(Spain) Fabri	Resigned (heath concerns)	27 May 2019	10th	(Ukraine) Oleksandr Chyzhevskyi (interim)	27 May 2019	10th
For changes that took place after 30 May 2019 (last round game day), see 2019–20 Ukrainian Premier League

== First stage ==
=== First stage table ===
Pos	Team	Pld	W	D	L	GF	GA	GD	Pts	Qualification or relegation (Note: Teams play each other twice (22 matches), before the league split into two groups (the top six and the bottom six) for the last 10 matches.)
1	Shakhtar Donetsk	22	18	3	1	52	9	+43	57	Qualification for the Championship round
2	Dynamo Kyiv	22	16	2	4	40	11	+29	50	Qualification for the Championship round
3	FC Oleksandriya	22	12	5	5	31	19	+12	41	Qualification for the Championship round
4	Zorya Luhansk	22	8	8	6	28	20	+8	32	Qualification for the Championship round
5	FC Lviv	22	7	9	6	19	20	−1	30	Qualification for the Championship round
6	FC Mariupol	22	8	6	8	24	33	−9	30	Qualification for the Championship round
7	Vorskla Poltava	22	9	2	11	18	28	−10	29	Qualification for the Relegation round
8	Desna Chernihiv	22	8	4	10	23	24	−1	28	Qualification for the Relegation round
9	Karpaty Lviv	22	5	6	11	26	37	−11	21	Qualification for the Relegation round
10	Olimpik Donetsk	22	4	8	10	25	33	−8	20	Qualification for the Relegation round
11	Chornomorets Odesa	22	4	4	14	12	34	−22	16	Qualification for the Relegation round
12	Arsenal Kyiv	22	3	3	16	12	42	−30	12	Qualification for the Relegation round

Source: Ukrainian Premier League Soccerway
Rules for classification: 1) Points; 2) Head-to-head points; 3) Head-to-head goal difference; 4) Head-to-head higher number of goals scored; 5) Goal difference; 6) Higher number of goals scored; 7) Draw or "golden match" if tied for title (Article 22, paragraph 3).

=== First stage results ===
Teams play each other twice on a home and away basis, before the league split into two groups – the top six and the bottom six.

Home \ Away	ARS	CHO	DES	DYN	KAR	LVI	MAR	OLK	OLD	SHA	VOR	ZOR
Arsenal Kyiv	—	1–1	0–2	0–1	1–1	0–2	1–2	0–3	1–3	0–3	2–2	0–5
Chornomorets Odesa	2–1	—	1–0	1–1	0–5	0–1	0–1	0–3	2–1	0–1	0–1	0–3
Desna Chernihiv	1–0	2–0	—	1–2	2–2	0–1	2–0	0–2	0–1	0–2	0–2	0–2
Dynamo Kyiv	4–0	2–0	4–0	—	0–2	0–1	4–0	1–0	1–0	1–0	1–0	5–0
Karpaty Lviv	1–2	1–0	0–2	0–4	—	0–1	1–1	0–2	2–2	1–6	0–1	0–1
FC Lviv	1–0	0–1	1–3	0–1	1–1	—	2–2	2–2	1–1	0–2	0–2	0–0
FC Mariupol	1–0	0–0	1–4	0–2 (Note: The game Mariupol – Dynamo was postponed to 26 September 2018 due to scheduling.)	1–1	2–2	—	1–0	2–1	0–3	1–0	3–2
FC Oleksandriya	1–0	3–2	1–1	2–1	2–1	1–2	1–1	—	1–1	0–2	2–0	1–0
Olimpik Donetsk	0–1	1–0	1–1	1–2	1–2	1–1	1–3	2–3	—	2–5	1–0	1–1
Shakhtar Donetsk	3–0	3–0	1–0	2–1	5–0	0–0	2–0	2–0	2–2	—	4–1	1–1
Vorskla Poltava	0–2	2–1	0–0	0–1	0–4	1–0	2–1	0–1	2–1	0–2	—	2–1
Zorya Luhansk	3–0	1–1	0–2	1–1	2–1	0–0	2–1	0–0	0–0	0–1	3–0	—

Source: UPL calendar (in Ukrainian)
Legend: Blue = home team win; Yellow = draw; Red = away team win.
For upcoming matches, an "a" indicates there is an article about the rivalry between the two participants.

=== First stage positions by round ===
The following table represents the teams position after each round in the competition played chronologically.

Team ╲ Round	1	2	3	4	5	6	7	8	9	10	11	12	13	14	15	16	17	18	19	20	21	22
Shakhtar Donetsk	3	1	3	3	2	1	1	1	1	1	1	1	1	1	1	1	1	1	1	1	1	1
Dynamo Kyiv	6	3	2	2	1	3	3	3	2	2	2	2	2	2	2	3	3	2	2	2	2	2
FC Oleksandriya	2	2	1	1	3	2	2	2	3	3	3	3	3	3	3	2	2	3	3	3	3	3
Zorya Luhansk	5	8	6	4	5	5	4	4	5	5	5	7	8	6	5	7	4	4	4	4	4	4
FC Lviv	1	7	10	7	10	10	10	7	9	8	9	8	5	8	8	8	8	8	8	8	8	5
FC Mariupol	7	11	11	11	11	11	11	11	8	6	6	5	6	5	7	6	6	7	7	5	5	6
Vorskla Poltava	9	10	9	10	7	8	7	5	4	4	4	4	4	4	4	4	5	5	6	6	6	7
Desna Chernihiv	11	6	8	9	9	6	9	6	7	9	7	9	7	7	6	5	7	6	5	7	7	8
Karpaty Lviv	12	4	4	8	8	9	8	10	10	10	10	10	10	9	9	10	10	10	9	9	9	9
Olimpik Donetsk	8	9	7	6	6	7	6	9	6	7	8	6	9	10	10	9	9	9	10	10	10	10
Chornomorets Odesa	4	5	5	5	4	4	5	8	11	11	11	11	11	11	11	11	11	11	11	11	11	11
Arsenal Kyiv	10	12	12	12	12	12	12	12	12	12	12	12	12	12	12	12	12	12	12	12	12	12

== Championship round ==
=== Championship round table ===
Pos	Team	Pld	W	D	L	GF	GA	GD	Pts	Qualification or relegation
1	Shakhtar Donetsk (C)	32	26	5	1	73	11	+62	83	Qualification for the Champions League group stage
2	Dynamo Kyiv	32	22	6	4	54	18	+36	72	Qualification for the Champions League third qualifying round
3	FC Oleksandriya	32	14	7	11	39	34	+5	49	Qualification for the Europa League group stage (Note: Since the winners of the 2018–19 Ukrainian Cup, Shakhtar Donetsk, qualified for European competition based on league position, the spot awarded to the cup winners (Europa League group stage) was passed to the third-placed team, the spot awarded to the third-placed team (Europa League third qualifying round) was passed to the fourth-placed team, and the spot awarded to the fourth-placed team (Europa League second qualifying round) was passed to the fifth-placed team.)
4	FC Mariupol	32	12	7	13	36	47	−11	43 (Note: Head to Head: Mariupol – Zorya +3=0-1, advantage Mariupol.)	Qualification for the Europa League third qualifying round
5	Zorya Luhansk	32	11	10	11	39	34	+5	43	Qualification for the Europa League second qualifying round
6	FC Lviv	32	8	10	14	25	40	−15	34	

Source: Ukrainian Premier League (in Ukrainian), UEFA, Soccerway
Rules for classification: 1) Points; 2) Head-to-head points; 3) Head-to-head goal difference; 4) Head-to-head higher number of goals scored; 5) Goal difference; 6) Higher number of goals scored; 7) Draw or "golden match" if tied for title (Article 22, paragraph 3).
(C) Champions

=== Championship round results ===
Home \ Away	DYN	LVI	MAR	OLK	SHA	ZOR
Dynamo Kyiv	—	2–1	2–1	1–1	0–0	1–1
FC Lviv	0–1	—	2–3	1–2	0–3	0–0
FC Mariupol	0–1	2–0	—	1–1	0–1	3–1
FC Oleksandriya	0–2	0–1	2–1	—	0–1	0–2
Shakhtar Donetsk	1–1	5–0	4–0	2–1	—	3–0
Zorya Luhansk	2–3	2–1	0–1	3–1	0–1	—

Source: UPL calendar (in Ukrainian)
Legend: Blue = home team win; Yellow = draw; Red = away team win.
For upcoming matches, an "a" indicates there is an article about the rivalry between the two participants.

=== Championship round positions by round ===
Team ╲ Round	23	24	25	26	27	28	29	30	31	32
Shakhtar Donetsk	1	1	1	1	1	1	1	1	1	1
Dynamo Kyiv	2	2	2	2	2	2	2	2	2	2
FC Oleksandriya	3	3	3	3	3	3	3	3	3	3
FC Mariupol	4	4	5	5	5	4	4	4	5	4
Zorya Luhansk	5	5	4	4	4	5	5	5	4	5
FC Lviv	6	6	6	6	6	6	6	6	6	6

== Relegation round ==
=== Relegation round table ===
Pos	Team	Pld	W	D	L	GF	GA	GD	Pts	Qualification or relegation
7	Vorskla Poltava	32	12	6	14	31	43	−12	42	
8	Desna Chernihiv	32	12	5	15	35	41	−6	41	
9	Olimpik Donetsk	32	7	13	12	41	48	−7	34	
10	Karpaty Lviv (O)	32	8	9	15	44	53	−9	33	Qualification for the Relegation play-offs
11	Chornomorets Odesa (R)	32	8	7	17	31	49	−18	31	Qualification for the Relegation play-offs
12	Arsenal Kyiv (R, X)	32	7	5	20	26	56	−30	26	Relegated and later withdrawn

Source: Ukrainian Premier League (in Ukrainian), UEFA, Soccerway
Rules for classification: 1) Points; 2) Head-to-head points; 3) Head-to-head goal difference; 4) Head-to-head higher number of goals scored; 5) Goal difference; 6) Higher number of goals scored; 7) Draw or "golden match" if tied for title (Article 22, paragraph 3).
(O) Play-off winners; (R) Relegated; (X) Withdrew

=== Relegation round results ===
Home \ Away	ARS	CHO	DES	KAR	OLD	VOR
Arsenal Kyiv	—	3–3	2–0	2–3	1–1	1–0
Chornomorets Odesa	1–3	—	3–0	3–1	1–1	1–2
Desna Chernihiv	1–0	2–4	—	2–1	2–1	0–1
Karpaty Lviv	1–2	0–0	2–0	—	3–3	4–0
Olimpik Donetsk	2–0	2–1	0–2	3–2	—	1–1
Vorskla Poltava	2–0	1–2	3–3	1–1	2–2	—

Source: UPL calendar (in Ukrainian)
Legend: Blue = home team win; Yellow = draw; Red = away team win.
For upcoming matches, an "a" indicates there is an article about the rivalry between the two participants.

=== Relegation round positions by round ===
Team ╲ Round	23	24	25	26	27	28	29	30	31	32
Vorskla Poltava	8	8	8	8	8	8	7	7	7	7
Desna Chernihiv	7	7	7	7	7	7	8	8	8	8
Olimpik Donetsk	10	10	10	9	9	9	9	9	9	9
Karpaty Lviv	9	9	9	10	10	10	10	10	10	10
Chornomorets Odesa	11	12	12	12	12	12	12	12	11	11
Arsenal Kyiv	12	11	11	11	11	11	11	11	12	12

== Relegation play-offs ==
Teams that placed 10th and 11th in the 2018–19 Ukrainian Premier League play two-leg play-off with the second and third teams of the 2018–19 Ukrainian First League. The draw for play-offs took place on 24 May 2019 and the games will be played on 4 and 8 June 2019.

Team 1	Agg.	Team 2	1st leg	2nd leg
Chornomorets Odesa	0 – 2	Kolos Kovalivka	0 – 0	0 – 2
Karpaty Lviv	3 – 1	Volyn Lutsk	0 – 0	3 – 1

=== First leg ===
4 June 2019
19:00 UTC+3

Chornomorets Odesa	0 – 0	Kolos Kovalivka
	Report

Chornomorets Stadium, Odesa
Attendance: 5,435
Referee: Anatoliy Abdula (Kharkiv)

4 June 2019
19:00 UTC+3

Karpaty Lviv	0 – 0	Volyn Lutsk
	Report

Ukraina Stadium, Lviv
Attendance: 10,104
Referee: Denys Shurman (Vyshneve)

=== Second leg ===
8 June 2019
17:00 UTC+3

Kolos Kovalivka	2 – 0	Chornomorets Odesa
Havrysh 57', 63' (pen.)	Report

Kolos Stadium, Kovalivka
Attendance: 2,500
Referee: Vitaliy Romanov

Kolos Kovalivka won 2–0 on aggregate and were promoted to the 2019–20 Ukrainian Premier League. Chornomorets Odesa were relegated to the 2019–20 Ukrainian First League

8 June 2019
19:00 UTC+3

Volyn Lutsk	0 – 3 ~~1 – 3~~	Karpaty Lviv
Kozhanov 42'	Report	Klyots 37'; Ponde 82' (pen.); Miroshnichenko 90+5'

Avanhard Stadium, Lutsk
Attendance: 5,200
Referee: Maksym Kozyryatskyi

Karpaty Lviv won 3–0 on aggregate and retained their spot in the 2019–20 Ukrainian Premier League. Volyn Lutsk remained in the 2019–20 Ukrainian First League

Due to fan violence at the game and attack on referee, the original score 1–3 was scratched and replaced with technical score 0–3 loss to Volyn and win for Karpaty. Additionally, the Lutsk department of police started criminal proceedings on the fact of intentional damage to property during the game by the Karpaty fans.

== Season statistics ==
=== Top goalscorers ===
As of 30 May 2019

Rank	Scorer	Team	Goals (Pen.)
1	(Ukraine) Júnior Moraes (Note: On 19 March 2019, Brazilian footballer Moraes received Ukrainian citizenship and was invited to the Ukraine national football team.)	Shakhtar Donetsk	19 (1)
2	(Ukraine) Viktor Tsyhankov	Dynamo Kyiv	18 (7)
3	(Ukraine) Maryan Shved	Karpaty Lviv	14 (3)
4	(Ukraine) Yevhen Banada	FC Oleksandriya	9
4	(Brazil) Bruno	FC Lviv	9
4	(Ukraine) Marlos	Shakhtar Donetsk	9 (1)
4	(Ukraine) Serhiy Vakulenko	Arsenal Kyiv	9 (5)
8	(Ukraine) Maksym Dehtyarov	Olimpik Donetsk	8
8	(Ukraine) Oleksandr Zubkov	FC Mariupol	8 (1)
8	(Ukraine) Oleksandr Karavayev	Zorya Luhansk	8 (2)
8	(Ukraine) Serhiy Myakushko	Karpaty Lviv	8 (3)

Notes:

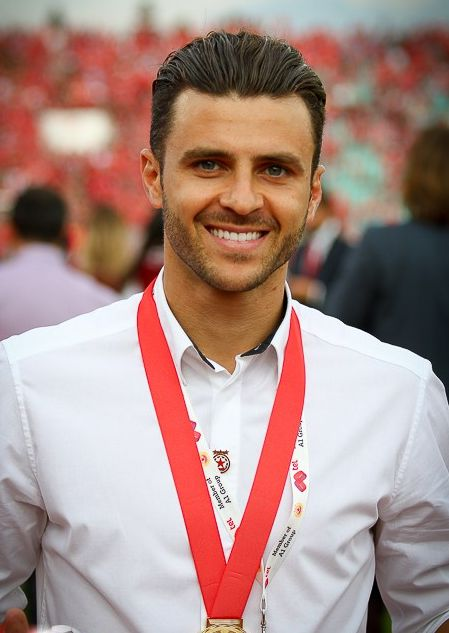
The UPL top scorer Júnior Moraes

=== Top assistants ===
As of 30 May 2019

Rank	Assistant	Team	Assists
1	(Brazil) Taison	Shakhtar Donetsk	12
2	(Ukraine) Viktor Tsyhankov	Dynamo Kyiv	11
3	(Brazil) Ismaily	Shakhtar Donetsk	7
3	(Brazil) Júnior Moraes	Shakhtar Donetsk	7
3	(Brazil) Alan Patrick	Shakhtar Donetsk	7
6	(Ukraine) Oleksandr Karavayev	Zorya Luhansk	5
6	(Ukraine) Serhiy Myakushko	Karpaty Lviv	5

=== Hat-tricks ===
Player	For	Against	Result	Date
(Brazil) Júnior Moraes	Shakhtar Donetsk	Olimpik Donetsk	5–2	24 August 2018
(Ukraine) Viktor Tsyhankov	Dynamo Kyiv	Karpaty Lviv	4–0	8 December 2018
(Ukraine) Maryan Shved	Karpaty Lviv	Vorskla Poltava	4–0	24 February 2019
(Brazil) Dentinho	Shakhtar Donetsk	Mariupol	4–0	26 May 2019

^{(number)} Player scored (number) goals if more than 3

Away win
Home win
Draw

Notes:

- On 18 September 2018 Ukrainian Premier League introduced publishing of UPL statistics using the system of InStat.

== Awards ==
=== Monthly awards ===
Month	Player of the Month		
Month	Player	Club	Ref.
July 2018	(Slovenia) Benjamin Verbič	Dynamo Kyiv	
August 2018	(Slovenia) Benjamin Verbič	Dynamo Kyiv	
September 2018	(Ukraine) Maryan Shved	Karpaty Lviv	
October 2018	(Brazil) Ismaily	Shakhtar Donetsk	
November 2018	(Ukraine) Maryan Shved	Karpaty Lviv	
December 2018	(Ukraine) Viktor Tsyhankov	Dynamo Kyiv	
March 2019	(Ukraine) Maryan Shved	Karpaty Lviv	
April 2019	(Ukraine) Viktor Tsyhankov	Dynamo Kyiv	
May 2019	(Ukraine) Serhiy Myakushko	Karpaty Lviv	

=== Round awards ===
Round	Player			Coach		
Round	Player	Club	Reference	Coach	Club	Reference
Round 1	(Ukraine) Oleksandr Karavayev	Zorya Luhansk		(Ukraine) Yuriy Vernydub	Zorya Luhansk	
Round 2	(Ukraine) Dmytro Khlyobas	Desna Chernihiv		(Ukraine) Oleksandr Ryabokon	Desna Chernihiv	
Round 3	(Slovenia) Benjamin Verbič	Dynamo Kyiv		(Belarus) Alyaksandr Khatskevich	Dynamo Kyiv	
Round 4	(Ukraine) Marlos	Shakhtar Donetsk		(Ukraine) Volodymyr Sharan	FC Oleksandriya	
Round 5	(Ukraine) Viktor Tsyhankov	Dynamo Kyiv		(Ukraine) Vasyl Sachko	Vorskla Poltava	
Round 6	(Brazil) Júnior Moraes	Shakhtar Donetsk		(Ukraine) Oleksandr Ryabokon	Desna Chernihiv	
Round 7	(Ukraine) Maryan Shved	Karpaty Lviv		(Portugal) José Morais	Karpaty Lviv	
Round 8	(Ukraine) Valeriy Fedorchuk	FC Mariupol		(Portugal) Paulo Fonseca	Shakhtar Donetsk	
Round 9	(Ukraine) Viktor Tsyhankov	Dynamo Kyiv		(Ukraine) Roman Sanzhar	Olimpik Donetsk	
Round 10	(Brazil) Taison	Shakhtar Donetsk		(Portugal) Paulo Fonseca	Shakhtar Donetsk	
Round 11	(Ukraine) Serhiy Hryn	Arsenal Kyiv		(Ukraine) Vyacheslav Hroznyi	Arsenal Kyiv	
Round 12	(Ukraine) Andriy Boryachuk	FC Mariupol		(Ukraine) Volodymyr Sharan	FC Oleksandriya	
Round 13	(Ukraine) Denys Bezborodko	Desna Chernihiv		(Ukraine) Yuriy Bakalov	FC Lviv	
Round 14	(Ukraine) Maryan Shved	Karpaty Lviv		(Portugal) Paulo Fonseca	Shakhtar Donetsk	
Round 15	(Ukraine) Mykola Shaparenko	Dynamo Kyiv		(Belarus) Alyaksandr Khatskevich	Dynamo Kyiv	
Round 16	(Ukraine) Andriy Tsurikov	FC Oleksandriya		(Ukraine) Volodymyr Sharan	FC Oleksandriya	
Round 17	(Ukraine) Kyrylo Kovalets	FC Oleksandriya		(Ukraine) Volodymyr Sharan	FC Oleksandriya	
Round 18	(Ukraine) Volodymyr Adamyuk	FC Lviv		(Ukraine) Yuriy Bakalov	FC Lviv	
winter break
Round 19	(Ukraine) Maryan Shved	Karpaty Lviv		(Belarus) Alyaksandr Khatskevich	Dynamo Kyiv	
Round 20	(Ukraine) Oleksandr Karavayev	Zorya Luhansk		(Ukraine) Yuriy Vernydub	Zorya Luhansk	
Round 21	(Ukraine) Viktor Kovalenko	Shakhtar Donetsk		(Portugal) Paulo Fonseca	Shakhtar Donetsk	
Round 22	(Ukraine) Viktor Tsyhankov	Dynamo Kyiv		(Ukraine) Yuriy Bakalov	FC Lviv	
Round 23	(Ukraine) Viktor Tsyhankov	Dynamo Kyiv		(Ukraine) Ihor Leonov	Arsenal Kyiv	
Round 24	(Ukraine) Viktor Tsyhankov	Dynamo Kyiv		(Ukraine) Oleksandr Ryabokon	Desna Chernihiv	
Round 25	(Ukraine) Denys Boyko	Dynamo Kyiv		(Ukraine) Volodymyr Sharan	FC Oleksandriya	
Round 26	(Ukraine) Artem Hromov	Zorya Luhansk		(Ukraine) Yuriy Vernydub	Zorya Luhansk	
Round 27	(Iceland) Árni Vilhjálmsson	Chornomorets Odesa		(Ukraine) Ihor Leonov	Arsenal–Kyiv	
Round 28	(Ukraine) Oleksandr Zubkov	FC Mariupol		(Portugal) Paulo Fonseca	Shakhtar Donetsk	
Round 29	(Ukraine) Júnior Moraes	Shakhtar Donetsk		(Portugal) Paulo Fonseca	Shakhtar Donetsk	
Round 30	(Ukraine) Viktor Tsyhankov	Dynamo Kyiv		(Bulgaria) Angel Chervenkov	Chornomorets Odesa	
Round 31	(Brazil) Dentinho	Shakhtar Donetsk		(Ukraine) Yuriy Vernydub	Zorya Luhansk	
Round 32	(Ukraine) Viktor Tsyhankov	Dynamo Kyiv		(Ukraine) Oleksandr Babych	FC Mariupol	

=== The 2018 Coach of the Year award ===
The best coaches were identified by the All-Ukrainian Football Coaches Association.

Place	Coach	Team	Mark
1	(Ukraine) Volodymyr Sharan	FC Oleksandriya	4.38
2	(Portugal) Paulo Fonseca	Shakhtar Donetsk	4.24
3	(Belarus) Alyaksandr Khatskevich	Dynamo Kyiv	4.16
4	(Ukraine) Yuriy Bakalov	FC Lviv	4.06
5	(Ukraine) Yuriy Vernydub	Zorya Luhansk	4.00

=== Season awards ===
The laureates of the 2018–19 UPL season were:

- Best player: (Ukraine) Viktor Tsyhankov (Dynamo Kyiv)
- Best coach: (Portugal) Paulo Fonseca (Shakhtar Donetsk)
- Best goalkeeper: (Ukraine) Andriy Pyatov (Shakhtar Donetsk)
- Best arbiter: (Ukraine) Anatoliy Abdula (Kharkiv)
- Best young player: (Ukraine) Vitalii Mykolenko (Dynamo Kyiv)
- Best goalscorer: (Ukraine) Júnior Moraes (Shakhtar Donetsk)

== See also ==
- 2018–19 Ukrainian First League
- 2018–19 Ukrainian Second League
- 2018–19 Ukrainian Cup
- List of Ukrainian football transfers summer 2018
- List of Ukrainian football transfers winter 2018–19
