= 2022–23 Ukrainian Premier League =

32nd season of top-tier football league in Vyshcha Liha

VBet Liha (UPL)
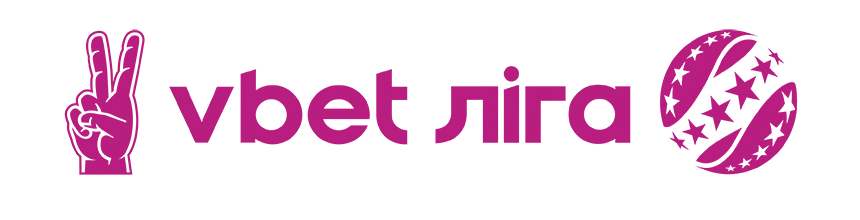
- Official logo
- Season: 2022–23
- Dates: 23 August 2022 – 4 June 2023
- Champions: Shakhtar Donetsk; 14th Ukrainian league title
- Relegated: Lviv; Metalist Kharkiv; Inhulets Petrove
- Champions League: Shakhtar Donetsk; Dnipro-1
- Europa League: Zorya Luhansk
- Europa Conference League: Dynamo Kyiv; Vorskla Poltava
- Matches: 240
- Goals: 479 (2 per match)
- Top goalscorer: Artem Dovbyk (24 goals)
- Biggest home win: Dnipro-1 5–0 Metalist (3 May 2023)
- Biggest away win: Metalist 1925 0–7 Shakhtar (5 March 2023)
- Highest scoring: Metalist 5–5 Veres (15 April 2023)
- Longest winning run: Dnipro-1; Shakhtar (6 matches)
- Longest unbeaten run: Dnipro-1 (13 matches)
- Longest winless run: Metalist (17 matches)
- Longest losing run: Lviv (6 matches)
- Total attendance: 0
- Average attendance: 0
- All statistics correct as of 4 June 2022.

The 2022–23 Ukrainian Premier League season, referred to as the VBet Liha for sponsorship reasons, was the 32nd top-level football club competition since the fall of the Soviet Union and the 15th since the establishment of the Ukrainian Premier League. The competition took place during the ongoing war with the Russia since late February 2022.

The defending champions were the 16-time winners Dynamo Kyiv. The previous 2021–22 season was abandoned due to the 2022 Russian invasion of Ukraine. Although Shakhtar Donetsk were at the top of the table when the league was abandoned, no title was officially awarded ("The handing out of awards to the league's medalists will not take place").

The current season began on 23 August 2022 and ended on 3 June 2023. Shakhtar Donetsk were crowned champions for the 14th time in their history.

== Preparation ==
=== War in Ukraine ===
Due to the full-scale invasion of Russia, teams were discussing the possibility of playing in western Ukraine as well as Poland. On 27 May 2022, a conference was held in the House of Football involving participants of the Ukrainian Premier League along with the UAF presidium. Topics discussed at the conference included the continuation of the league, possible places and dates of conducting it as well as its format for the future season. On 25 June, the league's executive director, Yevhen Dykyi, explained that the season was expected to start on 20 August in the usual format with 16 participants. Later, the president of the Ukrainian Association of Football clarified that the only teams allowed to play abroad would be those still in continental competitions, subject to their opponents' agreement.

Some football functionaries criticised conducting the competitions due to risks of deliberate Russian missile attacks.

=== Official ball ===
PUMA Orbita Ball is official football ball of the 2022–23 Ukrainian Premier League, and the Puma brand became an official technical sponsor. It is the leading ball model, certified by FIFA, designed specifically for professional football.

- The ball formed with high frequency technology provides excellent stability and reduced water absorption, as well as a soft ball feel.
- New 12-panel concept: identical sized panels for a perfectly balanced weight and flight behavior.
- Surface: 1.2mm thick 3D surface for greater durability and better aerodynamics. Innovative POE foam for strong grip, improved rebound performance and impact strength.

== Teams ==
This season the Ukrainian Premier League has kept 16 teams, which includes 14 teams from the previous season and the top two teams from the 2021–22 Ukrainian First League. Two teams had their status suspended due to the Russian occupation and/or destruction of their sports infrastructure.

=== Promoted teams ===
- Metalist Kharkiv – first-placed team of the 2021–22 Ukrainian First League (last competed in 2015–16)
- Kryvbas Kryvyi Rih – second-placed team of the 2021–22 Ukrainian First League (last competed in 2012–13)
  - Note: both clubs were adopted by the Ukrainian Premier League as their predecessors despite the fact that both Metalist and Kryvbas were dissolved in 2016 and 2013 respectfully. The new Metalist was renamed from Metal Kharkiv in 2021, while the new Kryvbas was renamed from Hirnyk Kryvyi Rih in 2020.

=== Omitted teams ===
- Mariupol – the 16th place team of the 2021–22 Ukrainian Premier League (ending their five-year stay in the top-flight)
- Desna Chernihiv – the 7th place team of the 2021–22 Ukrainian Premier League (ending their four-year stay in the top-flight)

In case if one or both Desna and Mariupol decide to return to the league competitions next season, it is predetermined that the league team pool would be increased to 18 teams.

=== Location map ===
Home venues of teams in the 2022–23 Ukrainian Premier League.
Many teams were playing away from their home venues due to the war.

=== Stadiums ===
The minimum threshold for the stadium's capacity in the UPL is 4,500 (Article 10, paragraph 8.3). With the ongoing Russian aggression clubs were forced to relocate to western parts of the country with the Ukrainian Association of Football listed its certified stadiums for the season competitions. It was decided that the main regions in which permitted to conduct competitions are Kyiv city, Kyiv Oblast, Lviv Oblast and Zakarpattia Oblast. A match could take place in other regions on permission of a regional military administration and agreement from the opposing club.

The following stadiums are regarded as home grounds:

Rank	Stadium	Place	Club	Capacity	Notes
1	NSC Olimpiyskiy	Kyiv	Shakhtar Donetsk	70,050	used as home ground during the season
1	NSC Olimpiyskiy	Kyiv	Metalist 1925 Kharkiv	70,050	used as home ground during the season
1	NSC Olimpiyskiy	Kyiv	FC Oleksandriya	70,050	used as home ground during the season
1	NSC Olimpiyskiy	Kyiv	Kryvbas Kryvyi Rih	70,050	used as home ground during the season
2	Arena Lviv	Lviv	Dynamo Kyiv	34,915	used as home ground in Round 2 and 4
2	Arena Lviv	Lviv	Shakhtar Donetsk	34,915	used as home ground in Round 4
3	Chornomorets Stadium	Odesa	Chornomorets Odesa	34,164	
4	Ukraina Stadium	Lviv	Rukh Lviv	27,925	
5	Butovsky Vorskla Stadium	Poltava	Vorskla Poltava	24,795	
6	Dynamo Stadium	Kyiv	Dynamo Kyiv	16,873	
6	Dynamo Stadium	Kyiv	Zorya Luhansk	16,873	used as home ground during the season
7	Avanhard Stadium	Uzhhorod	Metalist Kharkiv	12,000	used as home ground during the season
7	Avanhard Stadium	Uzhhorod	Vorskla Poltava	12,000	used as home ground in Round 2
7	Avanhard Stadium	Uzhhorod	Zorya Luhansk	12,000	used as home ground in Round 1
7	Avanhard Stadium	Uzhhorod	Dnipro-1	12,000	used as home ground during the season
8	Kolos Stadium	Kovalivka	Kolos Kovalivka	5,050	
9	Avanhard Stadium	Rivne	Veres Rivne	4,650	
10	Skif Stadium	Lviv	FC Lviv	4,033	
11	Hirnyk Stadium	Kryvyi Rih	Kryvbas Kryvyi Rih	2,500	
12	Inhulets Stadium	Petrove	Inhulets Petrove	1,869	
13	Bannikov Stadium	Kyiv	Chornomorets Odesa	1,678	used as home ground in Round 1
14	Mynai Arena	Mynai	FC Mynai	1,312	
14	Mynai Arena	Mynai	Vorskla Poltava	1,312	used as home ground in Round 4

=== Personnel and sponsorship ===
Team	President	Head coach	Captain	Kit manufacturer	Shirt sponsor
Chornomorets Odesa	Leonid Klimov	(Ukraine) Roman Hryhorchuk	(Ukraine) Illya Putrya	Kelme	—
Dnipro-1	Maksym Bereza	(Ukraine) Oleksandr Kucher	(Ukraine) Oleksandr Svatok	Nike	Parimatch
Dynamo Kyiv	Ihor Surkis	(Romania) Mircea Lucescu*	(Ukraine) Serhiy Sydorchuk	New Balance	A-Bank
Inhulets Petrove	Oleksandr Povoroznyuk	(Ukraine) Vladyslav Lupashko (interim)	(Ukraine) Maksym Kovalyov	Macron	etg.ua
Kolos Kovalivka	Andriy Zasukha	(Ukraine) Yaroslav Vyshnyak	(Ukraine) Vadym Milko	Nike	ATTP
Kryvbas Kryvyi Rih	Kostyantyn Karamanits	(Ukraine) Yuriy Vernydub	(Ukraine) Dmytro Khomchenovskyi	Joma	Rudomain
Lviv	Bohdan Kopytko	(Ukraine) Roman Handzyn (interim)	(Ukraine) Andriy Busko	Jako	Parimatch
Metalist Kharkiv	Oleksandr Yaroslavskyi	(Serbia) Perica Ognjenović (interim)	(Ukraine) Yehor Demchenko	Joma	DCH
Metalist 1925 Kharkiv	Yaroslav Vdovenko	(Ukraine) Edmar (caretaker)	(Ukraine) Artem Habelok	Puma	AES group
Mynai	Valeriy Peresolyak	(Ukraine) Volodymyr Sharan	(Ukraine) Oleksandr Bandura	Kelme	FavBet
Oleksandriya	Serhiy Kuzmenko	(Ukraine) Ruslan Rotan	(Ukraine) Maksym Tretyakov	Nike	AhroVista
Rukh Lviv	Hryhoriy Kozlovskyi	(Ukraine) Vitaliy Ponomaryov	(Ukraine) Yuriy Pankiv	Macron	Emily Resort
Shakhtar Donetsk	Rinat Akhmetov	(Croatia) Igor Jovićević	(Ukraine) Taras Stepanenko	Puma	FANVERSE
Veres Rivne	Ivan Nadieyin	(Ukraine) Yuriy Virt	(Ukraine) Bohdan Kohut	Kelme	Vbet
Vorskla Poltava	Kostyantyn Zhevago	(Ukraine) Viktor Skrypnyk	(Ukraine) Volodymyr Chesnakov	Nike	Ferrexpo
Zorya Luhansk	Yevhen Heller	(Netherlands) Patrick van Leeuwen	(Ukraine) Maksym Imerekov	Nike	—

Notes:

- On 22 April 2023 right after the Klasychne (Classic) rivalry with Shakhtar Donetsk, Mircea Lucescu announced at press-conference that he is taking a sick leave and the team (Dynamo Kyiv) will be managed temporarily by Oleksandr Shovkovskyi.

=== Managerial changes ===
Team	Outgoing manager	Manner of departure	Date of vacancy	Table	Incoming manager	Date of appointment
Vorskla Poltava	(Ukraine) Yuriy Maksymov	Dismissed	2 June 2022	Pre-season	(Ukraine) Viktor Skrypnyk	1 July 2022
Kryvbas Kryvyi Rih	(Ukraine) Oleksandr Babych	Mutual agreement	6 June 2022	Pre-season	(Ukraine) Yuriy Vernydub	21 June 2022
Zorya Luhansk	(Ukraine) Viktor Skrypnyk	Moved to Vorskla Poltava	28 June 2022	Pre-season	(Netherlands) Patrick van Leeuwen	28 June 2022
Dnipro-1	(Croatia) Igor Jovićević	End of contract	30 June 2022	Pre-season	(Ukraine) Oleksandr Kucher	29 July 2022
Shakhtar Donetsk	(Italy) Roberto De Zerbi	Mutual agreement	11 July 2022	Pre-season	(Croatia) Igor Jovićević	14 July 2022
Metalist Kharkiv	(Ukraine) Oleksandr Kucher	Moved to SC Dnipro-1	13 July 2022	Pre-season	(Ukraine) Oleh Ratiy (caretaker)	13 July 2022
Metalist 1925 Kharkiv	(Ukraine) Valeriy Kryventsov	Sacked	22 October 2022	10th	(Ukraine) Edmar (caretaker)	23 October 2022
Inhulets Petrove	(Ukraine) Serhiy Lavrynenko	Mutual consent	13 November 2022	15th	(Croatia) Mladen Bartulović (interim)	13 November 2022
Oleksandriya	(Ukraine) Yuriy Hura	Dismissed	14 December 2022	5th	(Ukraine) Ruslan Rotan	21 December 2022
Inhulets Petrove	(Croatia) Mladen Bartulović (interim)	End of interim	29 December 2022	14th	(Ukraine) Serhiy Kovalets	29 December 2022
Metalist Kharkiv	(Ukraine) Oleh Ratiy (interim)	Change of role	27 January 2023	11th	(Serbia) Perica Ognjenović (interim)	27 January 2023
Rukh Lviv	(Belarus) Leonid Kuchuk	Sacked	19 March 2023	14th	(Ukraine) Vitaliy Ponomaryov	20 March 2023
FC Lviv	(Belarus) Oleg Dulub	Resigned	21 March 2023	16th	(Ukraine) Anatoliy Bezsmertnyi	21 March 2023
FC Lviv	(Ukraine) Anatoliy Bezsmertnyi	Resigned	1 June 2023	16th	(Ukraine) Roman Handzyn (interim)	1 June 2023
Inhulets Petrove	(Ukraine) Serhiy Kovalets	Mutual agreement	4 June 2023	14th	(Ukraine) Vladyslav Lupashko (interim)	4 June 2023

== League table ==
Pos	Team	Pld	W	D	L	GF	GA	GD	Pts	Qualification or relegation
1	Shakhtar Donetsk (C)	30	22	6	2	69	21	+48	72	Qualification for the Champions League group stage
2	Dnipro-1	30	21	4	5	61	27	+34	67	Qualification for the Champions League second qualifying round
3	Zorya Luhansk	30	20	4	6	61	34	+27	64	Qualification for the Europa League play-off round
4	Dynamo Kyiv	30	18	6	6	51	25	+26	60	Qualification for the Europa Conference League third qualifying round
5	Vorskla Poltava	30	13	6	11	38	37	+1	45	Qualification for the Europa Conference League second qualifying round
6	Oleksandriya	30	10	14	6	42	39	+3	44	
7	Kryvbas Kryvyi Rih	30	12	5	13	26	30	−4	41	
8	Mynai	30	9	9	12	25	30	−5	36 (Note: Head-to-head points: Mynai 4, Kolos 1.)	
9	Kolos Kovalivka	30	10	6	14	23	36	−13	36	
10	Chornomorets Odesa	30	9	8	13	35	40	−5	35	
11	Rukh Lviv	30	7	11	12	31	37	−6	32 (Note: Tied on head-to-head points, head-to-head goal difference, head-to-head goals scored.)	
12	Metalist 1925 Kharkiv	30	6	14	10	23	42	−19	32	
13	Veres Rivne (O)	30	8	7	15	35	45	−10	31 (Note: Tied on head-to-head points, head-to-head goal difference, head-to-head goals scored.)	Qualification for the Relegation play-offs
14	Inhulets Petrove (R)	30	8	7	15	22	34	−12	31	Qualification for the Relegation play-offs
15	Metalist Kharkiv (R)	30	5	7	18	27	58	−31	22	Relegation to Ukrainian First League
16	Lviv (R)	30	3	4	23	18	52	−34	13	Suspended its operations for the next season

Source: upl.ua
Rules for classification: 1) Points; 2) Head-to-head points; 3) Head-to-head goal difference; 4) Head-to-head goals scored; 5) Goal difference; 6) Goals scored; 7) Draw or "Golden match" if two teams tied for title (Article 22, paragraph 3).
(C) Champions; (O) Play-off winners; (R) Relegated

== Results ==
Teams play each other twice on a home and away basis.

Home \ Away	CHO	DN1	DYN	INH	KOL	KRY	LVI	M25	MET	MYN	OLK	RUX	SHA	VER	VOR	ZOR
Chornomorets Odesa		1–2	0–3	1–1	3–0	0–1	2–0	1–1	0–0	0–1	1–2	1–3	2–2	0–1	0–1	0–4
Dnipro-1	1–0		0–1	2–2	2–1	1–0	5–2	3–0	5–0	3–1	1–1 (Note: The match, which kicked off on 23 November 2022, has been abandoned at the 10th minute, then resumed on 11 May 2023)	3–2	2–1	2–0	1–2	3–0
Dynamo Kyiv	2–3	0–3		0–2	0–0	3–1	1–0	0–0	3–0	2–0	3–1	3–0	1–1	3–0	1–1	0–1
Inhulets Petrove	1–2	0–2	1–2		0–1	0–0	1–0	0–0	2–1	1–2	1–2	1–0	0–2	1–0	0–1	1–0
Kolos Kovalivka	1–1	1–3	0–3	0–0		1–0	1–0	3–0	1–0	0–1	0–2	2–0	1–3	2–0	1–2	0–1
Kryvbas Kryvyi Rih	2–3	2–1	0–1	2–1	1–0		0–0	0–2	2–0	0–0	2–1	1–0	0–3	0–1	1–0	1–0
Lviv	0–1	0–3	0–2	0–2	0–1	2–2		0–2	1–1	1–0	0–1	2–1	1–2	1–3	0–2	2–3
Metalist 1925 Kharkiv	0–0	0–3	1–1	2–1	2–0	0–2	2–2		2–0	0–1	0–0	0–0	0–7	1–4	3–2	0–3
Metalist Kharkiv	0–3	0–1	1–3	1–1	0–0	0–1	1–0	0–0		1–2	0–0	1–2	1–6	5–5	3–2	0–5
Mynai	0–1	0–1	0–1	1–2	1–1	1–0	0–1	1–1	1–0		1–1	0–0	1–4	1–1	2–0	3–0 (Note: The Round 30 match Mynai – Zorya originally ended in 0–3 win for Luhansk team, on 23 June 2023 it was reversed by the UAF CDC which awarded a technical win 3–0 to Mynai, because Zorya fielded Dmytro Myshnyov who was not listed for the match.)
Oleksandriya	1–1	2–2	1–5	0–0	4–1	2–0	2–0	3–3	1–3	2–1		1–1	1–1	3–2	3–0	0–2
Rukh Lviv	2–2	2–3	1–1	3–0	0–1	2–1	2–0	1–1	1–2	1–1	0–0		0–1	0–0	1–1	3–1
Shakhtar Donetsk	2–1	3–0	3–1	3–0	3–0	1–0	2–0	0–0	1–0	1–0	2–2	2–0		2–1	3–2	2–2
Veres Rivne	1–3	0–1	0–1	1–0	0–1	1–2	3–2	1–0	1–2	1–1	2–2	2–2	0–2		2–2	0–1
Vorskla Poltava	2–1	0–0	1–2	1–0	2–0	1–0	1–0	0–0	3–2	2–0	0–0	0–1	2–1	1–2		2–3
Zorya Luhansk	3–1	2–1	3–2	2–0	2–2	2–2	3–1	3–0	3–2	1–1	4–1	3–0	0–3	1–0	3–1	

Source: UPL calendar
Legend: Blue = home team win; Yellow = draw; Red = away team win.
For upcoming matches, an "a" indicates there is an article about the rivalry between the two participants.

=== Matches affected by air alerts ===
Round 1.
Rukh vs Metalist. The match had been interrupted three times (in 44th, 51st, 77th minute).
Dnipro-1 vs Oleksandriya. The match, which kicked off on 23 November 2022, has been interrupted in the 10th minute, then resumed on 11 May 2023.
Round 5.
Veres vs Rukh. Kick off time was delayed for 30 minutes.
Lviv vs Dnipro-1. The match had been interrupted in the 55th minute.
Round 6.
Dynamo vs Rukh. The match had been interrupted in the 80th minute.
Round 7.
Metalist 1925 vs Lviv. Kick off time was delayed for 20 minutes.
Zorya vs Kolos. The match had been interrupted in the 59th minute.
Round 8.
Vorskla vs Rukh. The match had been interrupted in the 22nd minute.
Dnipro-1 vs Inhulets. The match had been interrupted in the 23rd minute.
Round 9.
Kryvbas vs Inhulets. The match had been interrupted in the 21st minute.
Kolos vs Chornomorets. Kick off time was delayed for 60 minutes.
Round 10.
Shakhtar vs Oleksandriya. The match had been interrupted in the 40th minute.
Round 11.
Oleksandriya vs Kolos. Kick off time was delayed for 20 minutes.
Round 12.
Kryvbas vs Vorskla. The match had been interrupted in the 3rd minute.
Kolos vs Dnipro-1. Kick off time was delayed for 120 minutes.
Round 13.
Vorskla vs Dnipro-1. Kick off time was delayed for 85 minutes.
Round 15.
Kryvbas vs Dnipro-1. The match had been interrupted in the 21st minute.
Round 16.
Oleksandriya vs Dnipro-1. The match had been interrupted in the 56th minute.
Round 18.
Vorskla vs Metalist 1925. The match had been interrupted in the 76th minute.
Round 20.
Kryvbas vs Zorya. The match had been interrupted in the 55th minute.
Round 22.
Kryvbas vs Chornomorets. The match had been interrupted in the 31st minute.
Oleksandriya vs Inhulets. The match had been interrupted in the 21st minute.
Round 24.
Zorya vs Veres. The match had been interrupted in the 71st minute.
Vorskla vs Dynamo. The match had been interrupted in the 82nd minute.
Round 25.
Kryvbas vs Dynamo. Kick off time was delayed for 15 minutes.
Round 27.
Oleksandriya vs Dynamo. The match had been interrupted in the 75th minute.
Round 28.
Kolos vs Dynamo. Kick off time was delayed for 40 minutes.
Round 30.
Vorskla vs Shakhtar. Kick off time was delayed for 20 minutes.

== Relegation play-offs ==
Teams that placed 13th and 14th in the 2022–23 Ukrainian Premier League play two-leg play-off with the third and fourth teams of the 2022–23 Ukrainian First League. The draw for play-offs took place on 2 June 2023 and the games will be played on 10 and 14 June 2023. If players of the clubs would be called to the national teams, games will be moved to June 8 and 12.

Team 1	Agg.	Team 2	1st leg	2nd leg
Inhulets Petrove	2–3	LNZ Cherkasy	1–1	1–2
Metalurh Zaporizhzhia	2–6	Veres Rivne	1–0	1–6

=== First leg ===
10 June 2023
17:40 UTC+3 (Note: Kick off time was delayed for 40 minutes due to air alert.)

Inhulets Petrove	1 – 1	LNZ Cherkasy
Klymenko 46'	Report	Tyshchenko 57' (pen.)

Inhulets Stadium, Petrove
Attendance: 0
Referee: Vitaliy Romanov (Dnipro)

10 June 2023
17:00 UTC+3

Metalurh Zaporizhzhia	1 – 0	Veres Rivne
Sad 29'	Report	Vovchenko (red card) 5'

Ukraina Stadium, Lviv
Attendance: 0
Referee: Yuriy Ivanov (Donetsk Oblast)

=== Second leg ===
14 June 2023
15:00 UTC+3

LNZ Cherkasy	2 – 1	Inhulets Petrove
Savin 17'; Korobenko 30' (o.g.); Tyshchenko (red card) 90+1'	Report	Sitalo 51'

Cherkasy Arena, Cherkasy
Attendance: 0
Referee: Maksym Kozyryatskyi (Zaporizhia)

LNZ Cherkasy won 3–2 on aggregate and were promoted to the UPL; Inhulets were relegated to the First League

14 June 2023
13:00 UTC+3

Veres Rivne	6 – 1	Metalurh Zaporizhzhia
Krapyvnyi 16' (o.g.); Balan 23', 66'; Hahun 29'; Pasich 82'; Hayduchyk 89'	Report	Sokol (red card) 37'; Mohylnyi 90+1'

Avanhard Stadium, Rivne
Attendance: 0
Referee: Dmytro Bondarenko (Odesa)

Veres Rivne won 6–2 on aggregrate and both teams remained in their respective divisions

== Season statistics ==
=== Top goalscorers ===
As of 6 June 2023

Rank	Scorer	Team	Goals (Pen.)
1	(Ukraine) Artem Dovbyk	Dnipro-1	24 (8)
2	(Ukraine) Nazariy Rusyn	Zorya Luhansk	13 (0)
2	(Albania) Taulant Seferi	Vorskla Poltava	13 (6)
4	(Ukraine) Vitaliy Buyalskyi	Dynamo Kyiv	12 (0)
4	(Ukraine) Vladyslav Vanat	Dynamo Kyiv	12 (1)
6	(Ukraine) Danyil Alefirenko	Zorya / Chornomorets	9 (0)
6	(Ukraine) Maksym Pryadun	Metalist Kharkiv	9 (0)
6	(Ukraine) Artem Bondarenko	Shakhtar Donetsk	9 (1)
6	(Ukraine) Danylo Sikan	Shakhtar Donetsk	9 (1)
6	(Ukraine) Yuriy Klymchuk	Rukh Lviv	9 (2)

=== Assists ===
As of 28 May 2023

Rank	Scorer	Team	Assists
1	(Ukraine) Oleksandr Pikhalyonok	Dnipro-1	10
2	(Ukraine) Heorhiy Sudakov	Shakhtar Donetsk	8
3	(Ukraine) Serhiy Buletsa	Zorya Luhansk	7
3	(Ukraine) Vitaliy Buyalskyi	Dynamo Kyiv	7
5	(Ukraine) Mykhailo Mudryk	Shakhtar Donetsk	6
6	(Brazil) Talles	Rukh Lviv	5
6	(Ukraine) Viktor Tsyhankov	Dynamo Kyiv	5

=== Clean sheets ===
As of 28 May 2023

Rank	Player	Club	Clean sheets
1	(Ukraine) Anatoliy Trubin	Shakhtar Donetsk	14
2	(Ukraine) Yevhen Volynets	Kolos Kovalivka	13
3	(Ukraine) Oleksandr Saputin	Zorya Luhansk	9
3	(Ukraine) Oleh Mozil	Metalist 1925 Kharkiv	9
3	(Ukraine) Oleksandr Bandura	Minai	9
6	(Brazil) Max Walef	Dnipro-1	8

== Awards ==
=== Monthly awards ===
Month	Player of the Month		Coach of the Month		Ref.
Month	Player	Club	Coach	Club	Ref.
August–September 2022	(Ukraine) Dmytro Klyots	Veres Rivne	(Ukraine) Yuriy Virt	Veres Rivne	
October 2022	(Ukraine) Artem Dovbyk	SC Dnipro-1	(Netherlands) Patrick van Leeuwen	Zorya Luhansk	
November–December 2022	(Ukraine) Artem Dovbyk	SC Dnipro-1	(Ukraine) Yuriy Vernydub	Kryvbas Kryvyi Rih	
February–March 2023	(Belgium) Ziguy Badibanga	Chornomorets Odesa	(Ukraine) Roman Hryhorchuk	Chornomorets Odesa	
April 2023	(Ukraine) Artem Dovbyk	SC Dnipro-1	(Netherlands) Patrick van Leeuwen	Zorya Luhansk	
May–June 2023	(Ukraine) Nazar Rusyn	Zorya Luhansk	(Ukraine) Vitaliy Ponomaryov	Rukh Lviv	

=== Round awards ===
Round	Player			Coach		
Round	Player	Club	Reference	Coach	Club	Reference
Round 1	The awards that supposed to be announced never were given out.					
Round 2	(Ukraine) Oleksandr Pikhalyonok	SC Dnipro-1		(Ukraine) Oleksandr Kucher	SC Dnipro-1	
Round 3	(Ukraine) Nazariy Rusyn	Zorya Luhansk		(Ukraine) Oleh Ratiy	Metalist Kharkiv	
Round 4	(Brazil) Talles	Rukh Lviv		(Belarus) Leonid Kuchuk	Rukh Lviv	
Round 5	(Ukraine) Danylo Sikan	Shakhtar Donetsk		(Ukraine) Valeriy Kryventsov	Metalist 1925 Kharkiv	
Round 6	(Ukraine) Artem Dovbyk	SC Dnipro-1		(Ukraine) Oleksandr Kucher	SC Dnipro-1	
Round 7	(Ukraine) Mykhailo Mudryk	Shakhtar Donetsk		(Croatia) Igor Jovićević	Shakhtar Donetsk	
Round 8	(Ukraine) Serhiy Buletsa	Zorya Luhansk		(Ukraine) Serhiy Lavrynenko	Inhulets Petrove	
Round 9	(Ukraine) Roman Debelko	Kryvbas Kryvyi Rih		(Netherlands) Patrick van Leeuwen	Zorya Luhansk	
Round 10	(Ukraine) Vitaliy Buyalskyi	Dynamo Kyiv		(Ukraine) Yuriy Hura	FC Oleksandriya	
Round 11	(Ukraine) Dmytro Kryskiv	Shakhtar Donetsk		(Ukraine) Yuriy Virt	Veres Rivne	
Round 12	(Ukraine) Artem Dovbyk	Dnipro-1		(Ukraine) Serhiy Lavrynenko	Inhulets Petrove	
Round 13	(Ukraine) Yevhen Volynets	Kolos Kovalivka		(Ukraine) Yaroslav Vyshnyak	Kolos Kovalivka	
Round 14	(Ukraine) Artem Dovbyk	Dnipro-1		(Ukraine) Oleksandr Kucher	Dnipro-1	
Round 15	(Ukraine) Oleh Mozil	Metalist 1925		(Ukraine) Yuriy Vernydub	Kryvbas Kryvyi Rih	
winter break
Round 16	(Ukraine) Volodymyr Brazhko	Zorya Luhansk		(Ukraine) Serhiy Kovalets	Inhulets Petrove	
Round 17	(Ukraine) Volodymyr Odaryuk	Inhulets Petrove		(Romania) Mircea Lucescu	Dynamo Kyiv	
Round 18	(Bosnia and Herzegovina) Rifet Kapić	Kryvbas Kryvyi Rih		(Netherlands) Patrick van Leeuwen	Zorya Luhansk	
Round 19	(Ukraine) Artem Dovbyk	SC Dnipro-1		(Ukraine) Roman Hryhorchuk	Chornomorets Odesa	
Round 20	(Ukraine) Oleksiy Hutsulyak	SC Dnipro-1		(Ukraine) Yuriy Vernydub	Kryvbas Kryvyi Rih	
Round 21	(Ukraine) Nazariy Rusyn	Zorya Luhansk		(Netherlands) Patrick van Leeuwen	Zorya Luhansk	
Round 22	(Ukraine) Danyil Alefirenko	Chornomorets Odesa		(Ukraine) Roman Hryhorchuk	Chornomorets Odesa	
Round 23	(Panama) Eduardo Guerrero	Zorya Luhansk		(Netherlands) Patrick van Leeuwen	Zorya Luhansk	
Round 24	(Brazil) João Peglow	SC Dnipro-1		(Ukraine) Oleksandr Shovkovskyi	Dynamo Kyiv	
Round 25	(Ukraine) Yuriy Klymchuk	Rukh Lviv		(Ukraine) Vitaliy Ponomaryov	Rukh Lviv	
Round 26	(Ukraine) Oleksandr Demchenko	Chornomorets Odesa		(Ukraine) Roman Hryhorchuk	Chornomorets Odesa	
Round 27	(Ukraine) Oleksandr Bandura	FC Mynai		(Ukraine) Volodymyr Sharan	FC Mynai	
Round 28	(Mali) Ibrahim Kane	Vorskla Poltava		(Ukraine) Viktor Skrypnyk	Vorskla Poltava	
Round 29	(Ukraine) Artem Bondarenko	Shakhtar Donetsk		(Croatia) Igor Jovićević	Shakhtar Donetsk	
Round 30	(Ukraine) Nazar Rusyn	Zorya Luhansk		(Ukraine) Viktor Skrypnyk	Vorskla Poltava	

== See also ==
- 2022–23 Ukrainian First League
- 2022–23 Ukrainian Second League
- 2022–23 Ukrainian Football Amateur League
- 2022–23 Ukrainian Women's League
- List of Ukrainian football transfers summer 2022
