= FC Lviv =

Lviv
- Full name: Football Club Lviv
- Founded: 2006; 20 years ago
- Dissolved: 2023; 3 years ago
- Ground: Arena Lviv, Lviv
- Capacity: 28,051
- President: Bohdan Kopytko
- 2022–23: Ukrainian Premier League, 16th of 16 (relegated)
| Home colours | Away colours | Third colours |

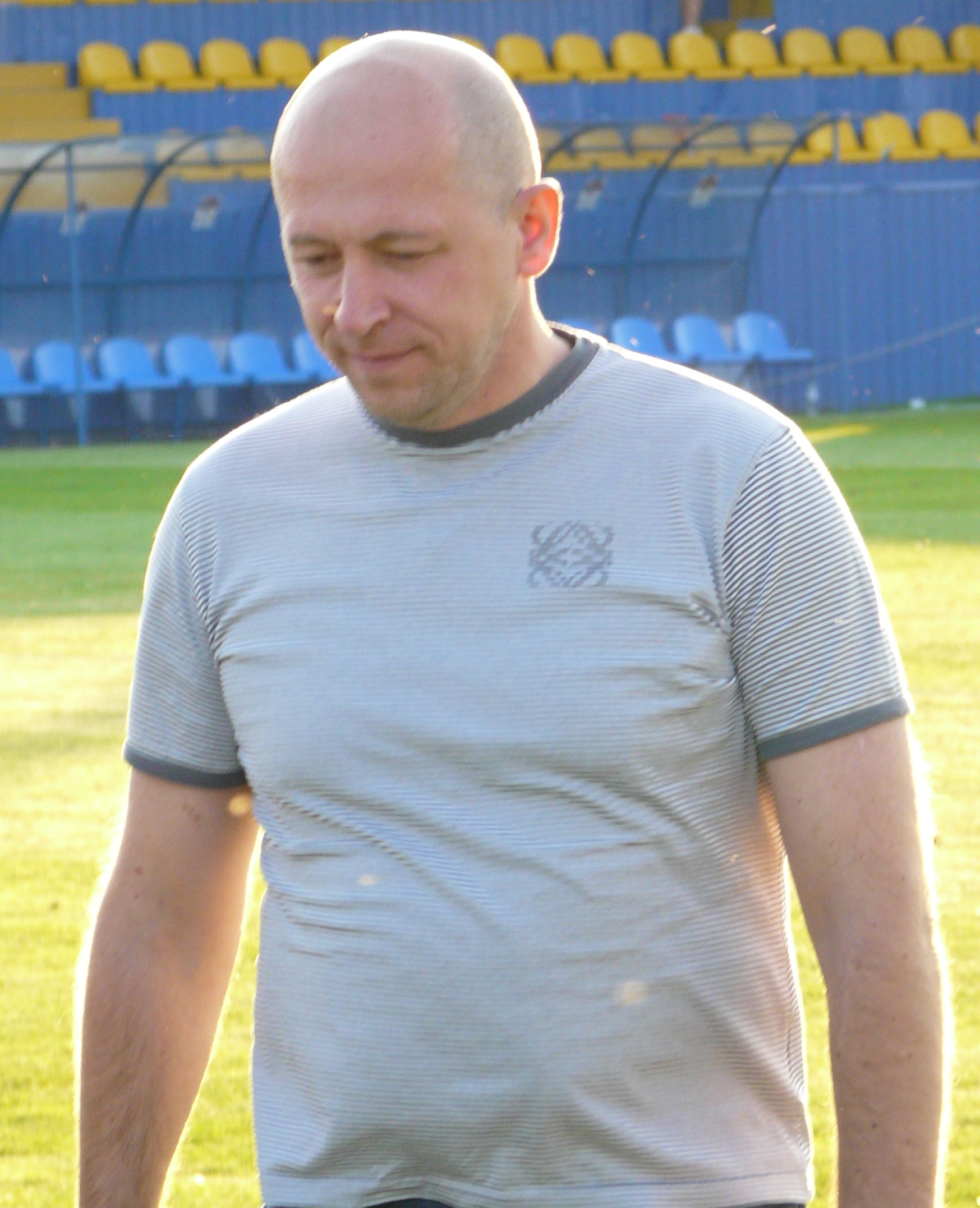
Yuriy Kindzerskyi (previous president)

FC Lviv (Ukrainian: ФК Львів) was a Ukrainian professional football club from the city of Lviv.

The history of the club is very controversial and was interrupted on numerous occasions. The first club under such name entered professional competitions back in 1992. In 2001 that club was merged with Karpaty Lviv. The second club appeared in 2006 replacing insolvent Hazovyk-Skala out of Stryi (not far from Lviv) in the second tier. In such manner the new club skipped few tiers of the national football pyramid. That club became bankrupt in 2012. Few years later in 2016 the club was revived based on its football academy. In 2017 the administration of NK Veres Rivne and FC Lviv reached an agreement which led to "castling" swap of their teams in the national football pyramid. In 2023 FC Lviv was relegated, but it suspended its operations due to hardship with an option to renew its professional next season.

While the first president of FC Lviv Oleksandr Didenko insisted that FC Lviv of 1992 has nothing to do with the later clubs, another football functionary Rostyslav Zaremba argued that it is not that simple.

== History ==
=== FC Lviv (2006–2012) ===
The club was founded in May 2006. It entered the Persha Liha as a replacement for the bankrupt club FC Hazovyk-Skala Stryi, which also represented Lviv Oblast. The new entity was registered on 22 May 2006 as a company with limited liability (Ukrainian: Товариство з обмеженою відповідальністю) "Football Club "Lviv". Later in May 2006 the PFL Bureau session adopted a decision to recognize the club as a lawful successor (Ukrainian: правонаступник) of FC Hazovyk-Skala Stryi that played in Persha Liha. This fact was also confirmed at a press-conference given at the Football Federation of Lviv Oblast on 26 May 2006. The new president of the new club Yuriy Kindzerskyi informed that his club was not created as a municipal club.

In its debut season FC Lviv reached 11th place and scored 45 goals. At the start of the next season, in the beginning of September 2007, the club moved to the newly built stadium Kniazha Arena in Dobromyl, west of Sambir. This arena was constructed by and named after Ukrainian insurance company Knyazha, who is the club's main sponsor. The previous home ground of the club was SKA Stadium in Lviv, which fell out of favor with the FFU, PFL.

In 2007–08 season FC Lviv finished 2nd in the Persha Liha and were promoted to the Premier Liha for the first time in their history, making the club one of the founders of the newly formed Premier League. In 2008–09 FC Lviv, despite a sensational opening 2–0 win against Shakhtar, were relegated to the Persha Liha. The decisive match for them happened in the last round against another Lviv team Karpaty in the Lviv derby when they lost 2–1. The club's first, and only, season in the Premier League was spent at The Ukraina Stadium together with Karpaty under a lease contract.

In 2009, the city of Lviv lent the former land property of LORTA Plant for rent to FC Lviv. Out of 3.0542 ha FC Lviv receives 2.9 ha in rent until the spring of 2019 and the rest for only five years.

On 12 July 2012 the sports director of FC Lviv Rostyslav Zaremba confirmed that the club has been withdrawn from competitions due to financial issues.

=== FC Lviv (since 2016) ===
In 2016 the professional team of FC Lviv was renewed and its future participation in Druha Liha was announced.

In May 2018, the club was promoted to the Ukrainian Premier League on pretence of merging with NK Veres Rivne and play in the 2018–19 Ukrainian Premier League.

At its official website, the club tells that all efforts of NK Veres Rivne are actually efforts of FC Lviv instead. The club states that it was FC Lviv that placed 6th in the 2017–18 Ukrainian Premier League, while the same claim for this achievement is laid by Veres Rivne. Records however clearly show that at that time FC Lviv played in the 2017–18 Ukrainian Second League and recovered their professional status only in 2017. This claim is particularly bold as in 2017 NK Veres Rivne, as a "people's club", had a big scandal with its promotion ahead of FC Desna Chernihiv. The archive of Ukrainian Association of Football "Footpass" shows the Premier League club NK Veres Rivne playing at the first preliminary round instead of FC Lviv (please, see Veres – Lviv swap). In 2018 following the swap there was an attempt to replace names in archived teams' performances.

At the end of March 2024, the internet website "Ukrainskyi Futbol" interviewed a director of FC Lviv sports school (DYuSSh) due to recent rumors of his intentions to revive a professional team. The website also inquired about details of the professional PFC Lviv that suspended its participation in competitions. Earlier in July 2023, the head of the Association of footballers of Ukraine stated that actions of the PFC Lviv leadership fall under an article about swindle.

== Coaches and administration ==
=== List of presidents ===
- 2006–2009: Yuriy Kindzerskyi
- 2009–2012: Football Federation of Lviv Oblast (led by Yaroslav Hrysyo)
- 2016–2018: Roman Mykhayliv
- Since 2018: Bohdan Kopytko

=== Administrative and coaching staff ===
| Administration | Coaching (senior team) | Coaching (U-21/U-19 team) |
|---|---|---|
| President – Bohdan Kopytko; Sportive director – Serhiy Dyomushkin | Head coach – (Belarus) Aleh Dulub; Coach – Eduard Pavlov; Goalies coach – Vadym Deonas; Analytic coach – Roman Handzyn | Head coach U21 – Ihor Rypnovskyi; Head coach U19 – Oleh Kolobych; Coach U19 – Oleh Yaremchuk; Goalkeeper coach U19 - Taras Shevchyk; Team administrator U19 - Nazar Tkachuk |

=== Football kits and sponsors ===
Since 2006 till 2012, the main sponsor was Knyazha (insurance company), other sponsors were Dobromyl, Persha Pryvatna Brovarnia (brewery), and the technical sponsor was Lotto.

| Years | Football kit | Shirt sponsor |
|---|---|---|
| 2008–2009 | Lotto | Knyazha; Vienna Insurance Group |

== Honours ==
- Ukrainian First League

Runners-up (1): 2007–08

== League and Cup history ==
| Season | Div. | Pos. | Pl. | W | D | L | GS | GA | P | Domestic Cup | Other | | Notes |
|---|---|---|---|---|---|---|---|---|---|---|---|---|---|
| Previous | Refer to FC Hazovyk-Skala Stryi | | | | | | | | | | | | |
| 2005–06 | 2nd (Persha Liha) | 6_{/18} | 34 | 14 | 10 | 10 | 35 | 33 | 52 | 1/8 finals | | | as Hazovyk Skala-Stryi |
| 2006–07 | 2nd (Persha Liha) | 11_{/19} | 36 | 13 | 8 | 15 | 45 | 45 | 47 | 1/8 finals | | | |
| 2007–08 | 2nd (Persha Liha) | 2_{/20} | 38 | 23 | 5 | 10 | 58 | 29 | 74 | 1/8 finals | | | Promoted |
| 2008–09 | 1st (Premier Liha) | 15_{/16} | 30 | 6 | 8 | 16 | 24 | 39 | 26 | 1/8 finals | | | Relegated |
| 2009–10 | 2nd (Persha Liha) | 4_{/18} | 34 | 19 | 6 | 9 | 49 | 22 | 63 | 1/32 finals | | | |
| 2010–11 | 2nd (Persha Liha) | 5_{/18} | 34 | 17 | 8 | 9 | 52 | 28 | 59 | 1/32 finals | | | |
| 2011–12 | 2nd (Persha Liha) | 18_{/18} | 34 | 6 | 3 | 25 | 21 | 79 | 18 | 1/32 finals | | | Folded |
The club was idle between 2012 and 2016
| 2016–17 | Amateurs | 10_{/12} | 20 | 3 | 4 | 13 | 19 | 31 | 13 | | UAC | 1/4 finals | Admitted to professionals |
| 2017–18 | 3rd (Druha Liha) | 5_{/10} | 27 | 10 | 6 | 11 | 28 | 29 | 36 | 1/4 finals | | | Swapped with Veres |
Merged with NK Veres Rivne (team swap)
| 2018–19 | 1st (Premier Liha) | 6_{/12} | 32 | 8 | 10 | 14 | 25 | 40 | 34 | 1/4 finals | | | |
| 2019–20 | 1st (Premier Liha) | 11_{/12} | 32 | 5 | 9 | 18 | 25 | 57 | 24 | 1/8 finals | | | |
| 2020–21 | 1st (Premier Liha) | 8_{/14} | 26 | 8 | 5 | 13 | 25 | 51 | 29 | 1/16 finals | | | |
| 2021–22 | 1st (Premier Liha) | 12_{/16} | 18 | 4 | 5 | 9 | 14 | 30 | 17 | 1/8 finals (Canceled) | | | All football competitions were suspended or abandoned on April 26 due to the 2022 Russian invasion of Ukraine. |
| 2022–23 | 1st (Premier Liha) | 16_{/16} | 30 | 3 | 4 | 23 | 18 | 52 | 13 | None | | | Relegated |

== FC Lviv-2 ==
Football Club Lviv-2 (Ukrainian: Футбольний Клуб Львів-2) was a reserve team of FC Lviv that played in the Ukrainian Second League competition.

The team was created based on a reserve (dublery) team that played in reserve competitions of the Vyshcha Liha in 2008–09 season. FC Lviv-2 played in the 2009-10 PFL League Cup.

=== League and cup history ===
| Season | Div. | Pos. | Pl. | W | D | L | GS | GA | P | Domestic Cup | Other | | Notes |
|---|---|---|---|---|---|---|---|---|---|---|---|---|---|
| 2009–10 | 3rd "A" | 8 | 20 | 4 | 7 | 9 | 13 | 25 | 19 | | PFL LG | QF | |

== Coaches ==
FC Lviv (2006)

- (Ukraine) Bohdan Bandura (30 June 2006 – 6 April 2007)
- (Ukraine) Vyacheslav Mavrov (interim, 6 April 2007 – 7 May 2007)
- (Ukraine) Stepan Yurchyshyn (7 May 2007 – 27 September 2008)
- (Ukraine) Roman Laba (interim, 27 September 2008 – 14 October 2008)
- (Ukraine) Serhiy Kovalets (14 October 2008 – 16 June 2009)
  - (Ukraine) Yuriy Benyo (14 October 2008 – 16 June 2009) (ass't coach)
- (Ukraine) Yuriy Benyo (16 June 2009 – 8 August 2009)
- (Ukraine) Vyacheslav Mavrov (interim, 8 August 2009 – 19 August 2009)
- (Ukraine) Ihor Yavorskyi (19 August 2009 – 10 November 2009)
- (Lithuania) Algimantas Liubinskas (1 January 2010 – 19 April 2010)
- (Ukraine) Viktor Ryashko (caretaker) (19 April 2010 – 23 June 2010)
- (Ukraine) Oleksandr Ryabokon (23 June 2010 – 28 June 2011)
- (Ukraine) Roman Laba (28 June 2011 – 24 September 2011) (interim)
- (Ukraine) Roman Marych (24 September 2011 – 1 February 2012) (interim)
- (Ukraine) Volodymyr Zhuravchak (1 February 2012 – June 2012)

FC Lviv (2016)

- (Ukraine) Andriy Chikh (Summer 2016 – 8 May 2018)
- (Ukraine) Andriy Khanas (interim, 8 May 2018 – 8 June 2018)
- (Ukraine) Andriy Demchenko (interim, 8 June 2018 – 29 June 2018)
- (Brazil) Gil Paulista (3 July 2018 – 14 August 2018)
- (Ukraine) Yuriy Bakalov (16 August 2018 – 8 April 2019)
- (Ukraine) Taras Hrebenyuk (interim, 8 April 2019 – 16 April 2019)
- (Ukraine) Bohdan Blavatskyi (16 April 2019 – 10 September 2019)
- (Ukraine) Volodymyr Mazyar (10 September 2019 – 31 October 2019)
- (Armenia) Yegishe Melikyan (31 October 2019 – 21 June 2020)
- (Georgia (country)) Giorgi Tsetsadze (22 June 2020 – 24 October 2020)
- (Ukraine) Vitaliy Shumskyi (28 October 2020 – 1 March 2021) (interim)
- (Ukraine) Anatoliy Bezsmertnyi (2 March 2021 – 25 August 2021)
- (Ukraine) Taras Chopyk (25 August 2021 – 6 September 2021) (interim)
- (Belarus) Oleg Dulub (6 September 2021 – 21 March 2023)
- (Ukraine) Anatoliy Bezsmertnyi (21 March 2023 – 1 June 2023)
- (Ukraine) Roman Handzyn (interim, 1 June 2023 – 4 June 2023)

== See also ==
- FC Skala Stryi (1911)
- FC Knyazha Shchaslyve
