= Oleh Ratiy =

Ukrainian footballer (born 1970)

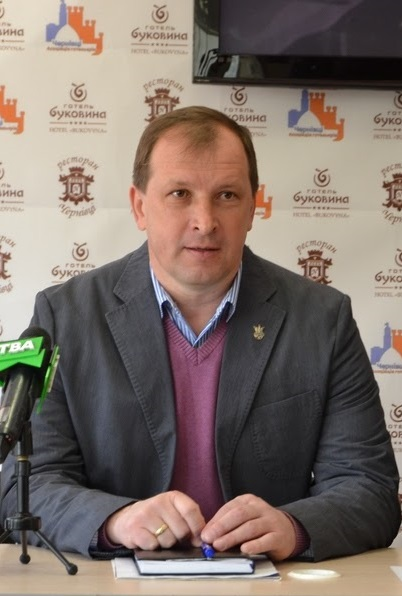

Personal information
- Full name: Oleh Borysovych Ratiy
- Date of birth: 5 July 1970 (age 56)
- Place of birth: Kharkiv, Ukrainian SSR
- Height: 1.87 m (6 ft 2 in)
- Position: Defender

Youth career
- Sports school 7 Kharkiv
- SC KhTZ Kharkiv

Senior career*
Years	Team	Apps	(Gls)
1991–1992	Olympik Kharkiv	33	(0)
1993	Avtomobilist Sumy	2	(0)
1993–1997	Kremin Kremenchuk	87	(7)
1995–1996	→ Vorskla Poltava (loan)	25	(2)
1997	→ Hirnyk-Sport Komsomolsk (loan)	2	(0)
1997–2002	Metalurh Zaporizhzhia	122	(6)
1998–2000	→ Metalurh-2 Zaporizhzhia	13	(1)
2000	→ SSSOR-Metalurh Zaporizhzhia	1	(0)
2003	Oleksandriya	14	(1)
2003	Nyva Vinnytsia	13	(0)
2004	Mykolaiv	15	(0)
2004–2005	Oleksandriya	26	(5)
2005	Volyn Lutsk	3	(0)
2006	Desna Chernihiv	15	(3)
Total		371	(25)

Managerial career
- 2006–2007: Ihroservice Simferopol (assistant)
- 2007–2008: Hirnyk-Sport Komsomolsk
- 2008: Arsenal-2 Kharkiv
- 2008: Stal Dniprodzerzhynsk (assistant)
- 2009: Oleksandriya (assistant)
- 2010–2011: Obolon Kyiv (assistant)
- 2012: Tatran Prešov (assistant)
- 2012: Metalurh Zaporizhzhia (assistant)
- 2012–2015: Ukraine U-21 (assistant)
- 2017: Bukovyna Chernivtsi
- 2017: Inhulets-2 Petrove
- 2022–2023: Metalist Kharkiv (caretaker)
- * Club domestic league appearances and goals

Oleh Ratiy (Ukrainian: Олег Борисович Ратій; born 5 July 1970) is a former Soviet and Ukrainian footballer and Ukrainian football coach.

== Honours ==
Individual

- Ukrainian Premier League Best Coach of the Round : 2022-23 Round 3,
