= Patrick van Leeuwen =

Dutch football manager

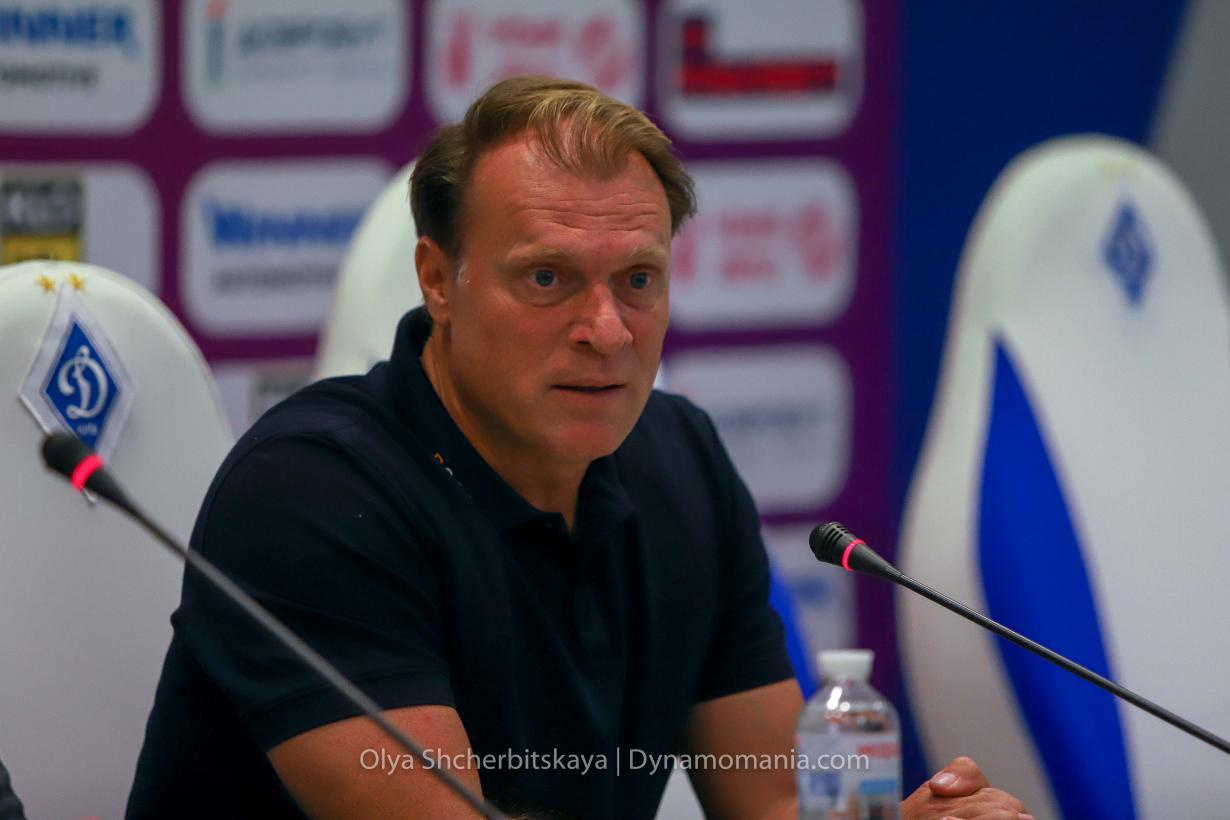

Personal information
- Date of birth: 8 August 1969 (age 57)
- Place of birth: Zoetermeer, Netherlands
- Position: Midfielder

Team information
- Current team: Kryvbas Kryvyi Rih (manager)

Youth career
- DWO
- 1985–1991: Sparta Rotterdam

Senior career*
Years	Team	Apps	(Gls)
1991–1994	Sparta Rotterdam	16	(0)
1994–1996	Helmond Sport	41	(3)
Total		57	(3)

Managerial career
- 2000–2006: Feyenoord (youth)
- 2006–2013: Shakhtar Donetsk (youth)
- 2013–2015: Kairat (sport director)
- 2016–2020: Maccabi Tel Aviv (youth director)
- 2020–2021: Maccabi Tel Aviv
- 2022–2023: Zorya Luhansk
- 2023: Shakhtar Donetsk
- 2024–2025: Metalist 1925 Kharkiv
- 2025–2026: Kryvbas Kryvyi Rih
- * Club domestic league appearances and goals

Patrick van Leeuwen (born 8 August 1969) is a Dutch professional football manager and former player who is currently the coach for Kryvbas Kryvyi Rih.

== Playing career ==
Van Leeuwen joined Dutch top flight outfit Sparta Rotterdam aged 16. Growing up was receiving a lot of injuries and decided to obtain a coaching certification. Aged 21 Leeuwen obtained his A License at the Sports Academy in Holland. His professional playing career with Sparta, where he made 16 league appearances.

In 1994, van Leeuwen signed for Helmond Sport in the Dutch lower leagues.

At the age of 27, he retired.

== Managerial career ==
After retirement, van Leeuwen was appointed youth manager of Feyenoord, one of the Netherlands' most successful clubs. After that, van Leeuwen was appointed youth manager of Shakhtar Donetsk in Ukraine via Henk van Stee, before being appointed director of Kazakhstani side Kairat.

In 2020, van Leeuwen was appointed manager of Maccabi Tel Aviv, the most successful club in Israel. In 2020–21, under his management, the team finished in second place in the Israeli Premier League and won the Israel State Cup.

On 26 October 2021 van Leeuwen was sacked due to a poor start to the regular season.

On 28 June 2022, he was appointed as a manager for Ukrainian club Zorya Luhansk which temporarily plays out of Zaporizhzhia due to the Russo-Ukrainian War. During the 2022–23 season, Van Leeuwen won the manager of the month award for October 2022. Zorya Luhansk placed 3rd in the 2022–23 Ukrainian Premier League season and qualified to the 2023–24 UEFA Europa League play-off round of the competition. van Leeuwen was recognized as the best manager of the 2022–23 season by the Ukrainian Premier League.

Following his performance with Zorya, van Leeuwen was invited to Shakhtar Donetsk during the inter-season summer break. He somewhat struggled from the beginning with five wins and three draws in the first eight games of the 2023–24 Ukrainian Premier League season. Many of the wins came with only a goal advantage, and the team earned their draws against mediocre opponents. The 2–1 loss to Vorskla Poltava was the first of the season, but it became the last game for van Leeuwen in the UPL as the Shakhtar head coach.

On 20 August 2024, van Leeuwen became the head coach of Metalist 1925 Kharkiv, playing the Ukrainian First League. He signed a three-year contract. Van Leeuwen was tasked with leading the club to the Ukrainian Premier League promotion. On 18 May 2025 he was "suspended" from performing his duties as the head coach.

On 9 June 2025, the Kryvbas Kryvyi Rih announced that they had hired van Leeuwen as their head coach, to replace Yuriy Vernydub who left the team after the 2024–25 season.

== Managerial statistics ==
As of 16 October 2023

Team	Nat	From	To	Record				
Team	Nat	From	To	G	W	D	L	Win %
Maccabi Tel Aviv (Caretaker Manager)	(Israel)	21 July 2020	21 August 2020	2	2	0	0	100.00
Maccabi Tel Aviv (Caretaker Manager)	(Israel)	24 December 2020	21 June 2021	32	22	7	3	68.75
Maccabi Tel Aviv	(Israel)	1 June 2021	26 October 2021	23	14	4	5	60.87
Zorya	(Ukraine)	28 June 2022	2 July 2023	32	21	4	7	65.63
Shakhtar	(Ukraine)	3 July 2023	16 October 2023	12	7	3	2	58.33
Total				101	66	18	17	65.35

== Honours ==
Maccabi Tel Aviv

- Israel State Cup: 2020–21

Individual

- Ukrainian Premier League Manager of the Month: October 2022, April 2023
