= Imexbank =

Former Ukrainian commercial bank

JSCB "IMEXBANK"
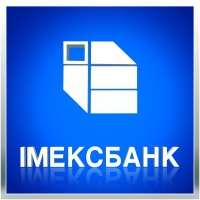
- Company type: Privately held company
- Industry: banking, investment
- Genre: Open joint-stock company
- Founded: 1994
- Founder: Leonid Klimov
- Defunct: 27 May 2015
- Headquarters: Odesa, Ukraine
- Area served: Ukraine (all-national)
- Key people: Leonid Klimov, Elena Gerasimova
- Services: Financial services
- Operating income: ▲ ₴30 million
- Owner: Leonid Klimov
- Subsidiaries: IMEXBANK Romania
- Website: imexbank.com.ua/eng

JSCB "IMEXBANK" (Ukrainian: ІМЕКСБАНК) was one of the largest commercial banks in Ukraine based in the city of Odesa. It was founded on March 29, 1994. The bank's primary owner was Leonid Klimov. On January 27, 2015, the National Bank of Ukraine declared Imexbank insolvent and introduced a temporary administration for a period of three months.

On May 27, 2015, the Deposit Guarantee Fund of Ukraine made a decision to liquidate Imexbank.

== History ==
IMEXBANK was opened on March 29, 1994. In 1998, the bank expanded outside of Odesa region, having opened a branch in Kyiv.

In 2002, the bank received a license from the international payment system MasterCard International, opening branches in Dnipro, Zaporizhia, Mykolaiv and Rivne.

In 2003, IMEXBANK joined the international interbank payment system SWIFT. At the end of 2003, the bank served 5,000 legal entities and more than 150,000 individuals, and branches were opened in Ternopil, Vinnytsia and Kropyvnytskyi.

As of 2004, IMEXBANK had more than 200 branches in Ukraine.

In 2006, the first foreign offices were opened in Austria and South Africa, and the following year in Romania. The Bank developed operations with bank metals and expanded the range of coins made of precious metals.

As of 2010, the bank's capital reached ₴990 million (approximately $120 million).

Due to financial crisis in Ukraine caused by Russia annexation of Crimea and War in Donbas, the bank was liquidated on May 27, 2015 by the decision of the National Bank of Ukraine.

On May 26, 2020, the Deposit Guarantee Fund of Ukraine sold at auction the Chornomorets Stadium, formerly owned by IMEXBANK to the american company "Allrise Capital", for ₴193.8 million.

== Membership ==
- Europay International
- MasterCard International
- The Ukrainian interbank association of Europay International members
- The partner of Western Union company
- Association of National Large-Scale Electronic Payments System (NLEPS) participants
- Association of Ukrainian Banks (AUB)
- The Odesa Bank Union
- Professional Association of Registrars and Depositaries (PARD)
- Open-ended Society "Interregional Fund Union" (IFU)
- Contributions warranting fund for private entities
- The Ukrainian Interbank Currency Stock Exchange (UICSE)

== Sponsors and Partners ==
- FC Chornomorets Odesa is the bank's asset
- IMEXBANK is one of the cofounders of the Odesa Bank Union
- First National Open-ended Pension Fund
- PRIMORIE Insurance Company mutual cooperation
- Black Sea Hotel (four star) mutual cooperation (10% off for the bank's clients)
- Andromed Medical Centre
