= Taras Hrebenyuk =

Ukrainian footballer

Personal information
- Full name: Taras Oleksandrovych Hrebenyuk
- Date of birth: 23 August 1971 (age 55)
- Place of birth: Zaporizhzhia, Soviet Union (now Ukraine)
- Height: 1.81 m (5 ft 11 in)
- Position: Goalkeeper

Team information
- Current team: Kryvbas Kryvyi Rih (goalkeeping coach)

Youth career
- –1988: Metalurh Zaporizhzhia

Senior career*
Years	Team	Apps	(Gls)
1988	Nyva Vinnytsia		
1990	Sokil Haisyn	27	(0)
1992	Chayka Sevastopol	21	(0)
1992–1993	Avtomobilist Sumy	42	(0)
1993–1994	Viktor Zaporizhzhia	37	(0)
1994–2002	Metalurh Zaporizhzhia	153	(0)
1999–2002	→ Metalurh-2 Zaporizhzhia	12	(0)
2002	Arsenal Kyiv	0	(0)
2003	Spartak Sumy	13	(0)
2003	Metalist Kharkiv	1	(0)
2003	→ Metalist-2 Kharkiv	2	(0)

Managerial career
- 2004–2005: Dinamo Minsk (goalkeeping coach)
- 2006: Spartak Vladikavkaz (goalkeeping coach)
- 2007–2010: Kryvbas Kryvyi Rih (goalkeeping coach)
- 2010: Dnipro Dnipropetrovsk (goalkeeping coach)
- 2010–2013: Arsenal Kyiv (goalkeeping coach)
- 2014–2015: Cherkaskyi Dnipro (goalkeeping coach)
- 2015–2017: Sheriff Tiraspol (goalkeeping coach)
- 2017–2018: Veres Rivne (goalkeeping coach)
- 2018–2019: Lviv (goalkeeping coach)
- 2019: Lviv (caretaker)
- 2020: Rukh Lviv (goalkeeping coach)
- 2021–: Kryvbas Kryvyi Rih (goalkeeping coach)
- * Club domestic league appearances and goals as of 30 June 2022

Taras Oleksandrovych Hrebenyuk (Ukrainian: Тарас Олександрович Гребенюк; born 23 August 1971) is a Ukrainian retired professional footballer who played as a goalkeeper. In 2004 he became a goalkeeping coach. Since 2007, he has served as the goalkeeping coach at Kryvbas Kryvyi Rih. In 2020 he took a short caretaking role at FC Lviv.

== Honours ==
Metalist Kharkiv

- Ukrainian First League runner-up: 2003–04
