= Yuriy Bakalov =

Ukrainian footballer and manager (born 1966)

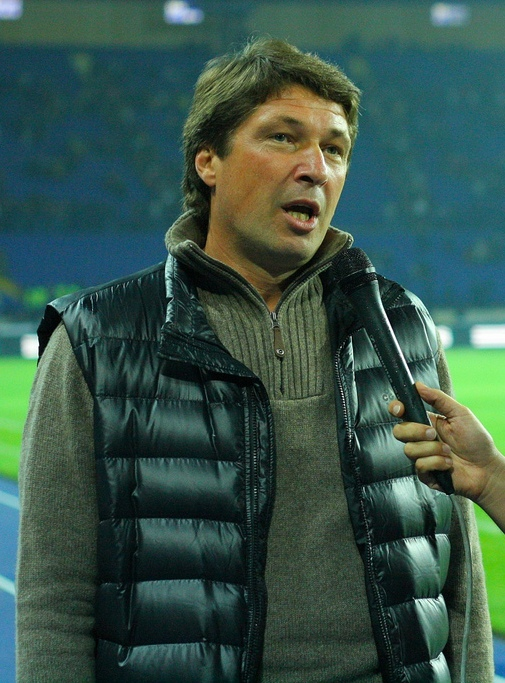
- Yuriy Bakalov (2010)

Personal information
- Full name: Yuriy Mykhaylovych Bakalov
- Date of birth: 16 January 1966 (age 60)
- Place of birth: Kyiv, Ukrainian SSR, Soviet Union
- Height: 1.87 m (6 ft 1 1/2 in)
- Positions: Defender; midfielder

Youth career
- –1983: SDYuShOR Zmina Kyiv

Senior career*
Years	Team	Apps	(Gls)
1983–1986	Dynamo Kyiv	0	(0)
1984–1986	→ Dynamo Irpin (loan)	19	(0)
1987	Torpedo Zaporizhzhia	30	(3)
1988	Metalurh Zaporizhia	1	(0)
1988–1993	Torpedo Zaporizhzhia	198	(12)
1993–1994	Nord-AM-LTD-Podillia	37	(2)
1994–1995	Nyva Myronivka	34	(0)
1995–1996	Veres Rivne	64	(6)
1997–1998	Cherkasy	69	(11)
1999–2000	Kremin Kremenchuk	31	(4)
2000	Dnipro Kyiv	?	(?)
2001	DPI Kyiv	8	(2)
2001	Obukhiv		
Total		491	(40)

Managerial career
- 2005–2006: Arsenal Kyiv (reservers)
- 2007: Arsenal Kyiv (U19)
- 2007–2010: Arsenal Kyiv (youth team)
- 2010: Arsenal Kyiv (caretaker)
- 2010–2011: Arsenal Kyiv
- 2011–2013: Arsenal Kyiv (assistant)
- 2013: Arsenal Kyiv
- 2013–2014: Slavutych Cherkasy
- 2016: Zugdidi
- 2017: Stal Kamianske (assistant)
- 2017–2018: Skala Stryi U19
- 2018–2019: Lviv
- 2019–2020: Rukh Lviv
- 2020–2022: LNZ Cherkasy
- * Club domestic league appearances and goals

Yuriy Bakalov (Ukrainian: Юрій Михайлович Бакалов; born 16 January 1966 in Kyiv, in the Ukrainian SSR of the Soviet Union - in present-day Ukraine) is a former Soviet and Ukrainian professional football midfielder and manager.

== Career ==
On 16 April 2010, Bakalov was appointed as interim coach to the Ukrainian Premier League club FC Arsenal Kyiv and on 18 May 2010 confirmed as main coach.
