= Roman Handzyn =

Ukrainian manager (born 1991)

Personal information
- Full name: Roman Mykhaylovych Handzyn
- Date of birth: 16 October 1991 (age 35)
- Place of birth: Ukrainian SSR

Managerial career
- Years: Team
- –2023: Lviv (academy)
- 2023: Lviv (interim)
- 2023–: Lviv (academy)

Roman Mykhaylovych Handzyn (Ukrainian: Роман Михайлович Гандзин; born 16 October 1991) is a Ukrainian football coach who was briefly appointed as an interim head coach of Lviv in 2023.

== Career ==
Roman Handzyn has been working at the FC Lviv academy and following the crisis in the club he was appointed as an acting head coach. Hadzyn became one of the youngest managers in the UPL and the youngest in the 2022–23 season after his emergency appointment.
