= Andriy Khanas =

Ukrainian footballer (born 1984)

Personal information
- Full name: Andriy Petrovych Khanas
- Date of birth: 26 July 1984 (age 42)
- Place of birth: Yahidnya, Lviv Oblast, Soviet Union (now Ukraine)
- Height: 1.82 m (6 ft 0 in)
- Position: Defender

Youth career
- 1998–2001: UFK Lviv

Senior career*
Years	Team	Apps	(Gls)
2001	Karpaty-3 Lviv	5	(0)
2001	Karpaty-2 Lviv	1	(0)
2002	Sokil Zolochiv	23	(1)
2003	Arsenal Kyiv	0	(0)
2003	CSKA Kyiv	11	(0)
2004–2005	Metalist Kharkiv	18	(0)
2006	Hazovyk-Skala Stryi	15	(3)
2006–2008	Lviv	54	(1)
2008	Knyazha Shchaslyve	5	(0)
2010–2011	Feniks-Illichovets Kalinine	0	(0)
2011	Sambir (amateurs)	9	(6)
2012	Volovets (amateurs)		
2016	Dobromyl (amateurs)	2	(0)
2017	Sokil Zolochiv (amateurs)	2	(0)
2018	Sambir (amateurs)		

International career
2003–2004	Ukraine U21	7	(0)

Managerial career
- 2013–2014: Karpaty Lviv (youth administrator)
- 2014–2015: Karpaty Lviv (administrator)
- 2014–2017: Karpaty Lviv (youth coach)
- 2017–2018: Lviv (assistant)
- 2018: Lviv (caretaker)
- 2020–2022: Dnipro-1 (assistant)
- 2022–2023: Shakhtar Donetsk (assistant)
- 2023–2024: Al-Raed (assistant)
- 2024–2025: Ludogorets Razgrad (assistant)
- 2025–2026: Widzew Łódź (assistant)
- * Club domestic league appearances and goals

Andriy Petrovych Khanas (Ukrainian: Андрій Петрович Ханас; born 26 July 1984) is a Ukrainian former professional footballer who played as a defender. He was most recently the assistant manager of Ekstraklasa club Widzew Łódź.

== Honours ==
Sokil Zolochiv

- Ukrainian Second League, Group A runner-up: 2001–02

Metalist Kharkiv

- Ukrainian First League runner-up: 2003–04

Lviv

- Ukrainian First League runner-up: 2007–08
