= Gil Paulista =

Brazilian footballer and manager (born 1970)

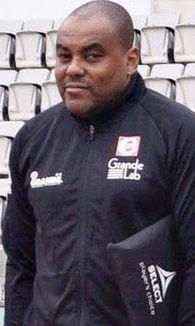
- Gil Paulista with Chao Pak Kei in 2018

Personal information
- Full name: Gilmar Tadeu da Silva
- Date of birth: 18 November 1970 (age 55)
- Place of birth: São Paulo, Brazil
- Position: Striker

Senior career*
Years	Team	Apps	(Gls)
1986–1989	Portuguesa		
1990–1993	Mixto		
1994–1996	União Mogi		
1996	Caxias		
1997	Ovarense		
1997–1999	Olhanense		
1999	Corinthians (PP)		
2000	Inter de Lages		
2001	Canoas		
2001–2002	Mahindra United		
2003	Inter de Lages		

Managerial career
- 2008–2009: Iraklis (scout)
- 2009–2010: Brazil International Football Academy India
- 2010–2011: Metalurh Zaporizhzhia (youth coach)
- 2011–2014: Metalurh Zaporizhzhia (assistant)
- 2014: União Mogi
- 2015: Osvaldo Cruz
- 2015–2016: Al-Mujazzal
- 2018: Chao Pak Kei
- 2018: Lviv
- 2018–2019: Chao Pak Kei
- 2021: Polissya Stavky (amateurs)
- 2025–: Riga (assistant)
- * Club domestic league appearances and goals

Gilmar Tadeu da Silva (born 18 November 1970), commonly known as Gil Paulista is a Brazilian football manager and former player.

== Career ==
Gilmar was born in 1970 in São Paulo, started playing football at a well-known youth team called Pequeninos do Jockey in São Paulo, then moved to Portuguesa de Desportos when he became a professional player playing as striker. As a player he did not get much attention on the pitch but still managed to play in several teams.

After retiring, he started his career out the pitch abroad in 2008, working as assistant coach in Greece and Ukraine. In 2010, he coached the Brazil International Football Academy (BIFA) on Cape Town/RSA International Football Tournament 2010. The competition which was organized by ONU and FIFA, gathered football academies from all over the world. Gilmar was the U17 Champion, beating an American academy at the final.

Late 2010, Gilmar moved to Metalurh Zaporizhya, to coach the Youth team, and a year later became the assistant coach of the main team, and participating in the whole process of the access of Metalurh to the first division in the 2011–12 season. In 2012, he started the process to obtain his UEFA coach license and completed FFU A Coaching Award UEFA A Diploma in 2016.

In 2014, Gilmar left Metalurh and moved back to Brazil to work for União Mogi and in 2015 for Osvaldo Cruz. Despite being a Brazilian footballer, he quickly identified differences between Europe and Brazil. He was quoted as saying, "First, the course (FFU UEFA) covers everything that involves football, so the coach there is called the manager, he participates from the hiring of personnel to the administration of the club. The football coach in Brazil is largely limited to team and games, with pressure for results". However, despite all constraints, Gilmar was positive about this experience in Brazil for his self improvement and continuous learning. In 2016, he managed to relocate himself to work in Saudi Arabi for Al-Mojzel.

After a short break looking for a new team, he coached Chao Pak Kei (CPK), a Macanese team which competes in the Liga de Elite. CPK finished the 2018 Liga de Elite in the second position which is the best ranking ever. Gilmar was hired by FC Lviv in Ukraine, to be the head coach for the coming season.
