= Chornomorets Stadium =

Association football stadium built in Odesa, Ukraine

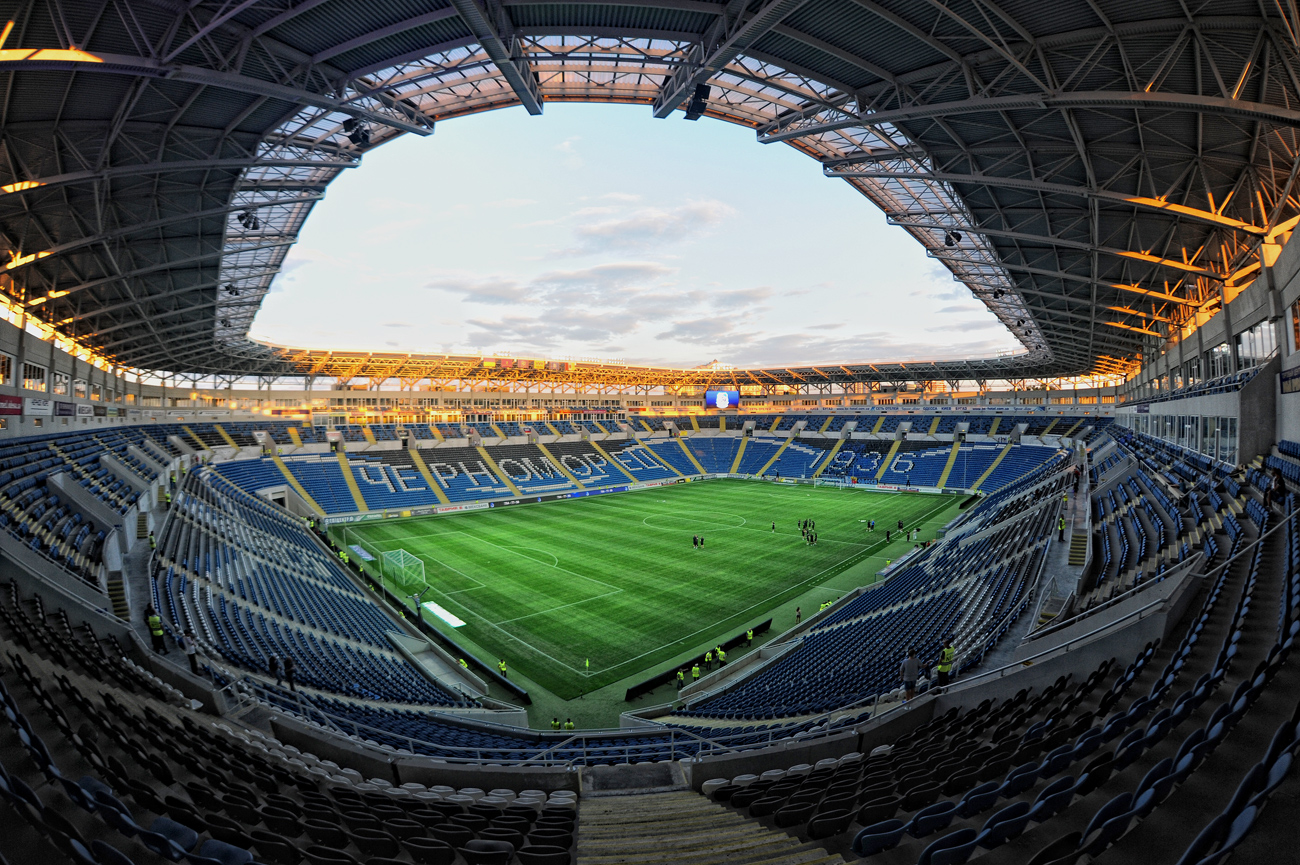
- UEFA Category 4 Stadium
- Interactive map of Chornomorets Stadium
- Location: Shevchenko Park, Odesa, Ukraine
- Coordinates: 46°28′49″N 30°45′20″E
- Owner: Allrise Capital
- Capacity: 34,164
- Surface: Grass
- Field size: 105 m × 68 m (344 ft × 223 ft)

Construction
- Groundbreaking: September 3, 2008
- Built: 2008–2011
- Opened: 19 November 2011; 14 years ago

Tenants
- FC Chornomorets Odesa (2011–present); FC Seasters (2023–present)

Website
- Official site

The Chornomorets Stadium (Ukrainian: Стадіон «Чорноморець», romanized: Stadion «Chornomorets») is a football stadium built in 2011 in Odesa, Ukraine. The stadium has a capacity of 34,164 and is the home of FC Chornomorets Odesa and FC Seasters. The inaugural match, between FC Chornomorets Odesa and FC Karpaty Lviv, was played on 19 November 2011, and ended with a 2–2 draw. The first goal was scored by Vitaliy Balashov in the 46th minute from a penalty.

The stadium was constructed on the site of the old Soviet multi-use Central Stadium of the Black Sea Shipping Company (ChMP), which was demolished in 2009. The venue was considered to be one of the stadiums of UEFA Euro 2012 but failed to be nominated as such.

== History ==
=== Name ===
- 1935—1938: Stanislav Kosior Stadium
- 1938—1945: Taras Shevchenko Park Stadium
- 1945—1958: Central Stadium Kharchovyk
- 1958: Avanhard Stadium
- 1958—2009: Central Stadium of the Black Sea Shipping Company (alternatively Central Stadium ChMP)
- since 2011: Chornomorets Stadium

=== Former stadium ===
The former ChMP stadium was built on the same site in 1935, and it was originally named as Stanislav Kosior Stadium after the First Secretary of the Communist Party of the Ukrainian SSR, Stanislav Kosior. After Stanislav Kosior was repressed in the 1930s, the name was changed to Shevchenko Park Stadium.

After World War II, the stadium was passed to the ownership of the republican Ministry of Food and received name as the Central Stadium Kharchovyk. At the end of the 1950s, it was renamed as Avanhard Stadium after the Ukrainian Sport Society of industrial workers. In 1959, the stadium was renamed to the Central Stadium of the Black Sea Shipping Company or alternatively Central Stadium Chornomorets.

ChMP could hold 34,362 people. It hosted the Ukrainian Super Cup from 2004 until 2007. At the end of 2008, it was closed and, in 2009, it was demolished.

=== New stadium ===
==== Financial crisis ====
The stadium was a part of a defunct Imexbank assets. On May 26, 2020, the Deposit Guarantee Fund of Ukraine sold at auction the Chornomorets Stadium to the American company "Allrise Capital Inc.", for ₴193.8 million ($7.24 million). Allrise Capital's main owner is Russian expat in America Vladimir Yevseyev.

In August 2020, the Shevchenko District Court of Kyiv arrested the stadium complex and handed over to the Agency in search and management of assets (Ukrainian). The pretrial investigation began based on a statement of public organization "Olimpik" that owns the football club with the same name. About ten days later it was announced that the same court decided to cancel arrest of the stadium.

==== Russo-Ukrainian war ====
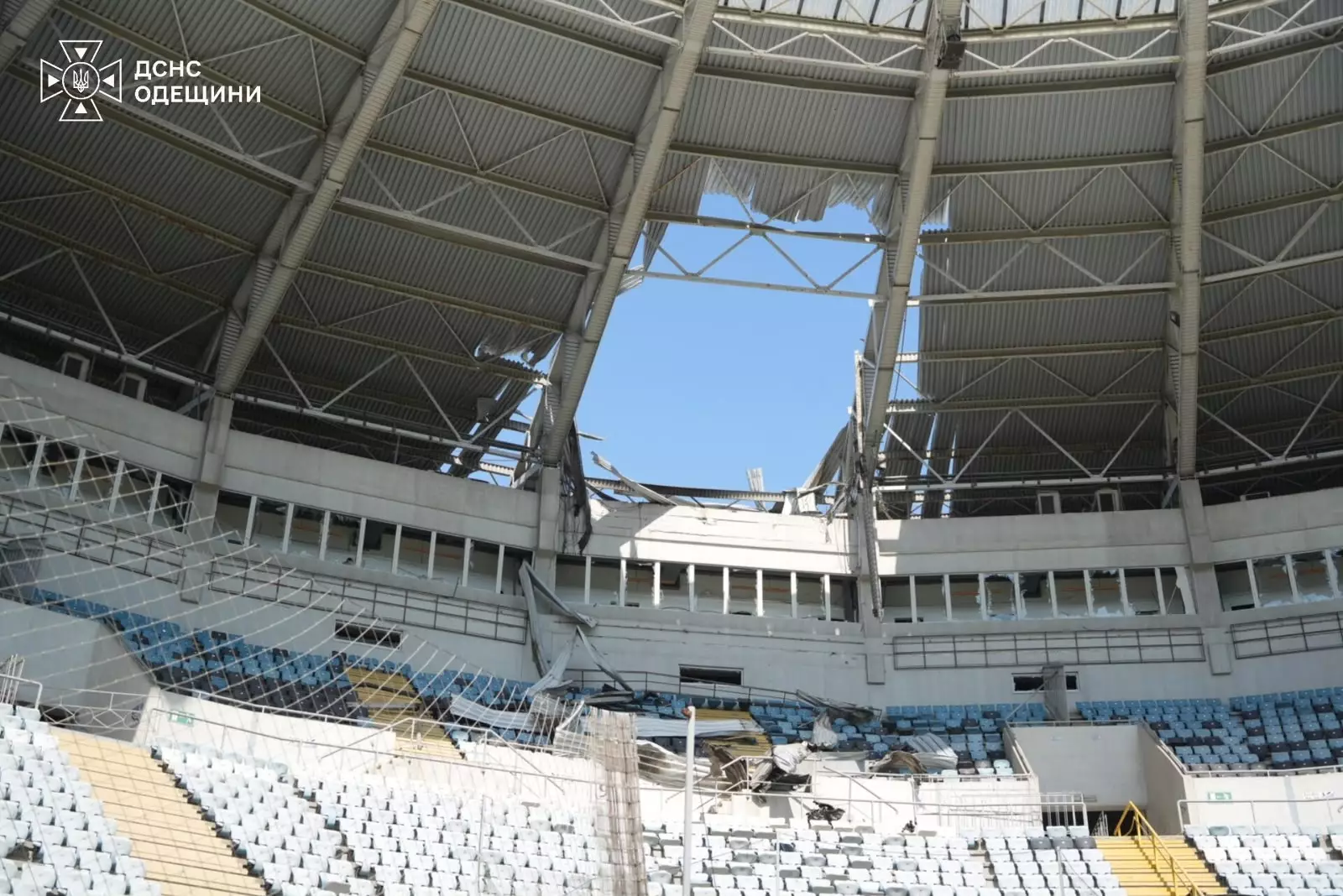
After the attack on 7 August 2026

In February 2023, due to the 2022 Russian invasion of Ukraine, the Russian text on the stadium's facade was replaced by the Ukrainian version.

On 7 August 2026, the stadium was hit by a Russian drone, partially damaging the roof and stands. Two people were injured. FC Chornomorets' match against FC Kolos Kovalivka, which was to take place the following day, was postponed.

== Gallery ==
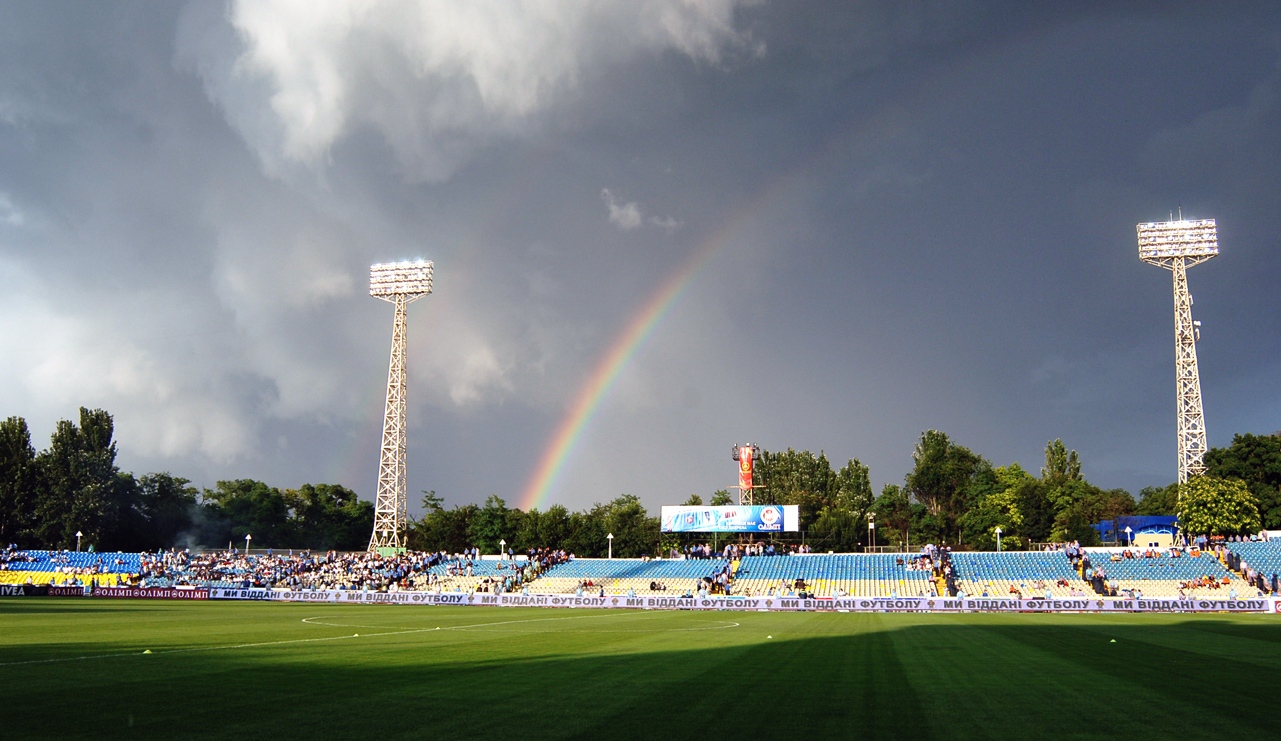
Black Sea Shipping Company Stadium (ChMP)

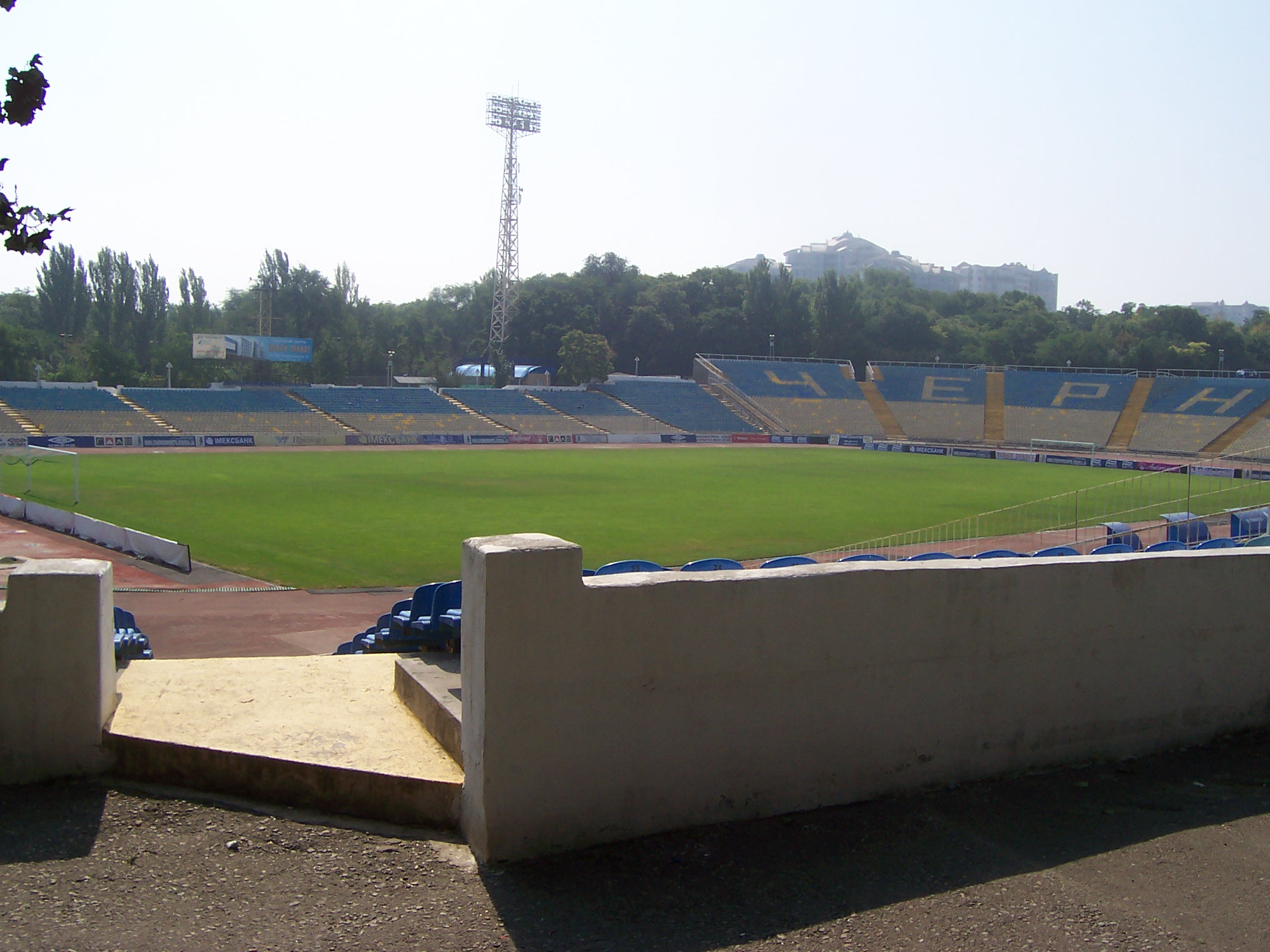
ChMP in 2004

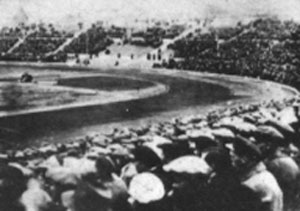
Kosior Stadium, 1936

View of new stadium with Black Sea in background

Stadium entrance and Imexbank

== See also ==
- Black Sea Shipping Company, former owner of the stadium
