= Leonid Klimov =

Ukrainian banker and politician

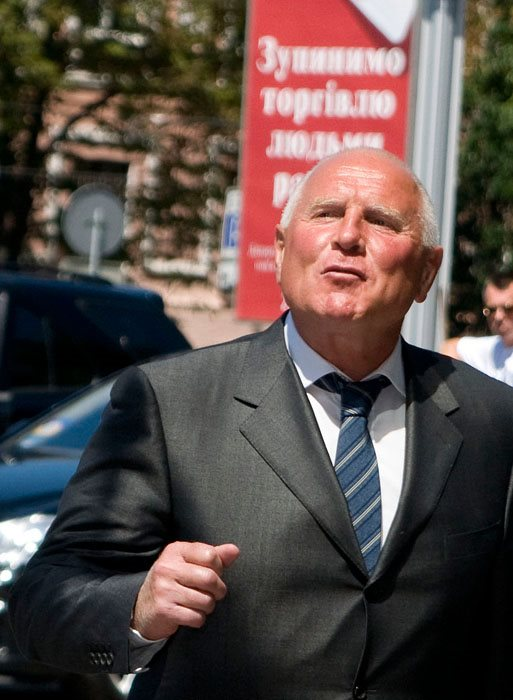
Leonid Klimov

Leonid Mykhailovych Klimov (Ukrainian: Леонід Михайлович Клімов; born 31 March 1953) is a Ukrainian parliamentarian, banker, and politician. He is a member of the Party of Regions in Verkhovna Rada (from November 2007) and a member of the Committee on National Security and Defense (from December 2007). He is also a member of the Party of Regions Council and chairman in the Odesa Oblast department of the Party of Regions.

== Biography ==
He was born on 31 March 1953 in Makiivka, Donetsk Oblast. He has a wife, Tatiana Yuriivna (born 1962), who is a housewife, and three children: daughters Daria (1983) and Anastasia (1997) and son, Alex (1994).

He graduated from the Odesa Institute of People's Economy in 1979. He was an economist of Product Management and Organization of Food Products.

== Timeline of career ==
=== Commercial ===
- 1970–71 – fireman for the municipal fire department of the city of Makiivka.
- 1971–73 – service in the army.
- 1973–76 – driver for the Odesa branch of the RAdio-Telegraph Agency for the Cabmin of UkrSSR (RATAU), the Odesa plant producing tactical construction vehicles, and the Regional Tuberculosis Clinic.
- 1974–79 – student of the Odesa Institute of People's Economy.
- 1976 – manager of Store #11 of the Odesa Regional office of the Ukrainian Republican Union Sportproducts.
- 1976–79 – chief of the Instruction Department of the Central District Committee of Lenin's Komsomol of the Ukrainian Peasant's Youth (LKSMU) in the city of Odesa.
- 1979–80 – instructor of the organizational department for the executive committee of the Odesa City Council of People's Deputies.
- 1980–82 – acting for the deputy-chief of theVRP, a chief of the trade-producing sector for the Odesa Railroad.
- 1982–89 – deputy-director and director of the Seaside Produce trade for the Odesa Trade Administration.
- 1989 – deputy-chief of the Trade Administration for the Odesa Oblast Executive Committee.
- 1989–90 – chief of service and the general director of the Railroad Association, and chief of the worker's supply department for the Odesa Railroad.
- 1990–91 – director of the small enterprise "Progress" (Prohres), the city of Odesa.
- 1991–95 – president of the collective enterprise "Trade house-Seaside Ltd." (Torhovy dim-Prymorya LTD), the city of Odesa.
- 1995–2001 – president of the CJSC Financial Group "Seaside" (Prymorya), the city of Odesa.
- 2001–02 – president of the CJSC Football Club "Chornomorets".

=== Political ===
- April 2002 – April 2006 – People's Deputy of Ukraine (IV Convocation) from electoral district #143 of Odesa Oblast nominated by the political bloc For United Ukraine!, and received 30.35% of votes while competing against 10 other candidates.
- At the time of the elections – president of the Odesa Bank Union.
- May–June 2002 – member of the Party of Regions while also in the political bloc For United Ukraine!.
- June 2002 – September 2005 – authorized representative of bloc Regions of Ukraine.
- From September 2005 – authorized representative of the bloc for the political party Regions of Ukraine.
- June 2002 – May 2006 – member of the Banking and Finance Committee.
- April 2006 – November 2007 – People's Deputy of Ukraine (V Convocation) from the Party of Regions, listed as #39.
- From July 2006 – member of the Banking and Finance Committee.
- From May 2006 – member of the political bloc Party of Regions.
- From November 2007 – People's Deputy of Ukraine (VI Convocation) from the Party of Regions, listed as #38.

In the 2012 parliamentary election he was (re)-elected into parliament for Party of Regions after winning (with 48.46%) in single-member districts number 137 (first-past-the-post wins a parliament seat) located in Odesa Oblast. In 2014, he joined the parliamentary faction Economic Development.

In the 2014 parliamentary election Klimov was re-elected into parliament again as an independent candidate again in single-member districts number 137; this time with 30.09% of the votes.

In the 2019 Ukrainian parliamentary election Klimov lost reelection as an independent candidate in single-seat constituency 137 (Podilsk).

== Awards ==
Klimov was awarded the Order of Merit III degree (April 2003).

== See also ==
Imexbank
