= Yuri Shevchuk (disambiguation) =

Yuri Shevchuk or Yuriy Shevchuk may refer to:

- Yuri Shevchuk (born 1957), Russian musician
- Yuri Shevchuk (figure skater) (born 1990), Russian figure skater
- Yuriy Shevchuk (footballer) (born 1985), Ukrainian footballer
