= Vasyl Leskiv =

Soviet footballer (born 1963)

Vasyl Leskiv Василь Леськів
Personal information
- Full name: Vasyl Ivanovych Leskiv
- Date of birth: 20 December 1963 (age 62)
- Place of birth: Stare Selo, Ukrainian SSR
- Position: Midfielder

Youth career
- DYuSSh-4 Lviv

Senior career*
| Years | Team | Apps | (Gls) |
| 1985–1987 | Torpedo Lutsk | 127 | (15) |
| 1988 | Podillia Khmelnytskyi | 49 | (4) |
| 1989–1993 | Karpaty Lviv | 166 | (11) |
| 1993–1994 | Maccabi Petah Tikva | 33 | (0) |
| 1994–1995 | Karpaty Lviv | 33 | (3) |
| 1995–2001 | FC Lviv | 318 | (36) |
| 1999 | → Karpaty Lviv (loan) | 1 | (0) |
| 2001–2002 | Karpaty Lviv | 13 | (0) |
| 2001–2002 | → Karpaty-2 Lviv (loan) | 12 | (0) |
| 2001 | → Karpaty-3 Lviv (loan) | 2 | (1) |

Managerial career
- 2005–2008: FC Pustomyty
- 2008–2012: FC Horodok
- * Club domestic league appearances and goals

Vasyl Ivanovych Leskiv (Ukrainian: Василь Іванович Леськів; born 20 December 1963) is a Soviet and Ukrainian former football player and manager. A veteran of Karpaty Lviv and Lviv, he has played more than 150 official matches for each of these clubs. Top scorer of Lviv in all Ukrainian championships, he scored 36 goals.

== Career ==
Leskiv studied in “Lviv” CYSS-4. His first coach was Ihor Yevstahiyovych Kulchytsky. After three seasons at Torpedo (Lutsk) and one year at Podillya (Khmelnytsky), the midfielder moved to the newly restored FC Karpaty Lviv in 1989. Together with the Lviv team, Leskiv won gold medals in the second Soviet league in 1991 and played in the first independent championships. In 1993 he joined the Israeli club Maccabi Petah Tikva F.C.

From 1995 to 2001 he spent 6 seasons for FC Lviv in the first league. He immediately became a regular player and regularly scored penalties. He became the team's top scorer in the 1998–99 championship — 12 goals. In total, Vasyl Leskiv played 217 matches for FC Lviv in the championships of Ukraine.

Since 2005 he has been the head coach of the Pustomyty amateur team (Lviv region). Works as a coach at CYSS "Karpaty" (Lviv). In December 2008, he agreed to head the amateur club Horodok from the city of the same name in the Lviv region.
