= FC Karpaty Lviv =

Professional association football club based in Lviv, Ukraine

Karpaty Lviv
- Full name: Футбольний клуб "Карпати" Львів
- Nicknames: The Lions, Zeleno-Bili (The Green-Whites)
- Founded: 1963; 63 years ago
- Ground: Ukraina Stadium, Lviv
- Capacity: 28,051
- Owners: Zakhidnyi Buh; Unikom Group; Shvydkyi svit
- Director: Stepan Yurchyshyn
- Head coach: Fran Fernández
- League: Ukrainian Premier League
- 2025–26: Ukrainian Premier League, 9th of 16
- Website: fckarpaty.org.ua
Home colours	Away colours	Third colours

Football Club Karpaty Lviv (Ukrainian: Футбольний клуб "Карпати" Львів [kɐrˈpɑtɪ ˈlʲwiu̯]) is a Ukrainian professional football club based in Lviv.

== History ==
=== Early years (1963–68) ===
The team of Karpaty was founded on 18 January 1963, and was originally called Silmash Lviv. In 1961, the team won the championship of Lviv Oblast but lost its promotion play-off against Naftovyk Drohobych to qualify for the Soviet Class B championship. In 1962 Silmash Lviv won the championship and cup of the Lviv Oblast and won the promotional play-offs against Naftovyk, obtaining the rights to participate in the Soviet Class B championship. However, in 1963 the Football Federation of the Soviet Union conducted another reorganization of national football tournaments, creating the Second Group of Class A and Class B became the third tier, where a berth was reserved for a team from Lviv. At that time, the best city team was SKA Lvov. However, SKA Lvov players did not tend to stay there for long, leaving the club at the end of their military service, while the best would be drafted to CSKA Moscow. The city administration decided to create a civilian team, independent of the Soviet military.

In December 1962, in the building of the Regional Council of Trade Unions (at prospekt Shevchenka), the head of the council and the regional football federation, Hlib Klymov, invited coaches of Silmash – Yuri Zubach (former player of Ukraina Lwów) and Vasyl Solomonko, as well as the director of the city plant "Lvivsilmash" Ivan Kalynychenko to discuss a new name for the club. The name Silmash was recognized as inadequate for participation on such a level. Among the proposed names were Spartak, Dynamo, Halychyna. In the end, the group agreed upon the regional toponym Karpaty (Carpathians).

In Soviet times, all sports teams were "tied" to certain industrial unions or sports societies; therefore, the Regional Tax Administration won 1–0. The goal was scored by the club's captain Oleksandr Filiayev. The first official game was against Lokomotiv Gomel on 23 April 1963, which Karpaty won 1–0 (goal scored by Anatoliy Kroshchenko).

Karpaty debuted in Group B in 1963 and remained there for four seasons, until 1968 when they were promoted to Soviet First League.

=== Winning the Soviet Cup ===
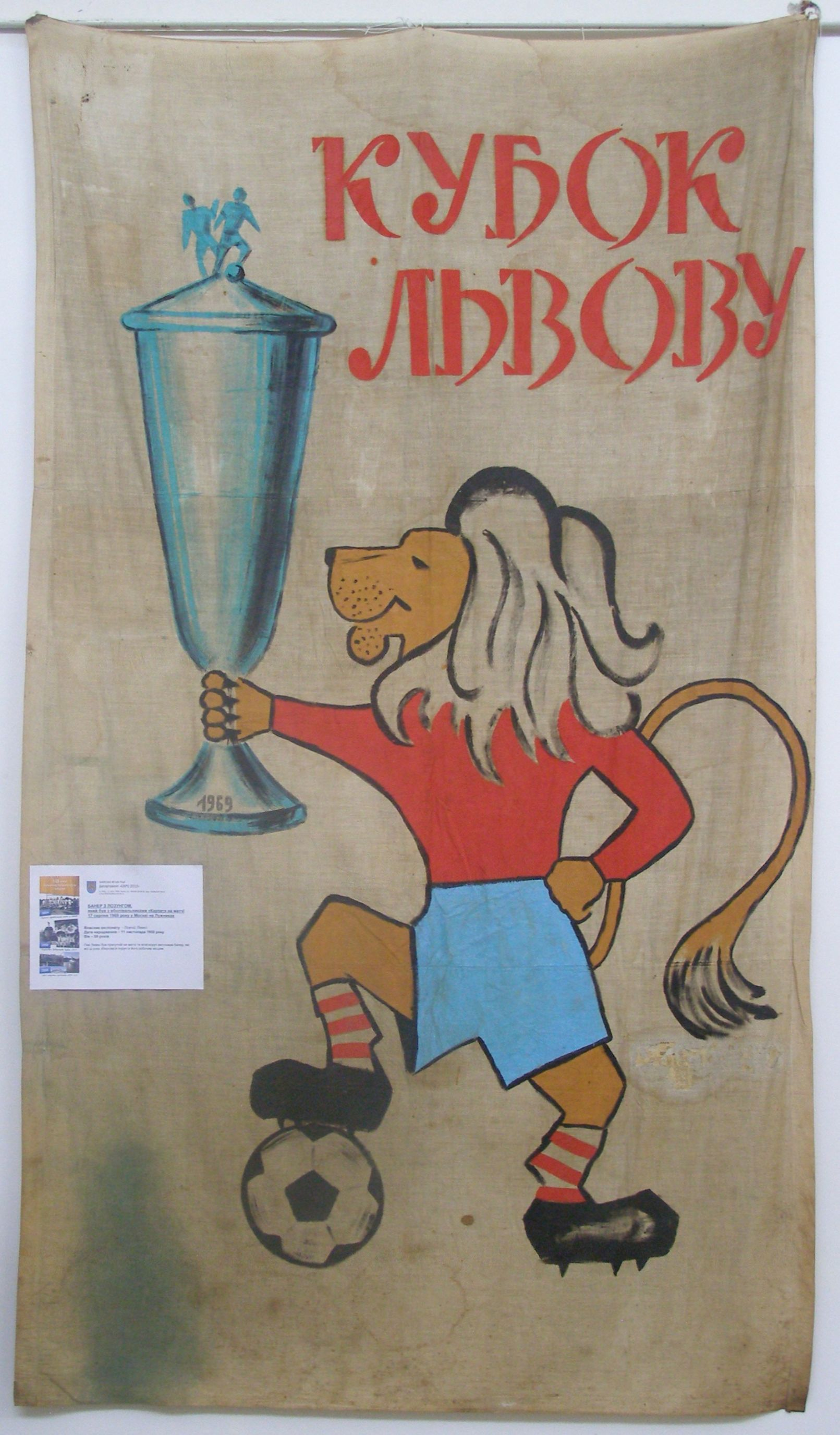
The banner "The Cup for Lviv!"

On 17 August 1969, Karpaty became the first (and the only) club in Soviet football history to win the Soviet Cup while playing in the Soviet First League. The road to the cup was as exciting as the final itself. On the way there, the Lions were challenged by Soviet heavyweights such as Ararat Yerevan and Chornomorets Odesa. The quarterfinal round matched them with Trud Voronezh, which in the prior round had eliminated Spartak Moscow. After a narrow victory over Voronezh, Karpaty faced Mykolaiv's Shipbuilders. The game was perceived by the Lvivians as a chance to avenge the previous year's loss to the Mykolaivans, which cost them a ticket to the Soviet Premiership. A score of 2–0 was enough to secure a trip to Moscow.

In the final, Karpaty faced the Red Army team from Rostov-on-Don at the Lenin Stadium. The Rostov army-men were one of the best Soviet clubs in the mid-1960s, and for that game they were considered the favorites, being the representatives of the Soviet Top League. Before the start of the game, Karpaty's captain Ihor Kulchytskyi traditionally shook hands with every match official, except the assistant referee, Eugen Härms. The reason was that Härms, the Estonian referee in charge of their game a year earlier against Uralmash Sverdlovsk, allowed a goal from what was regarded as an obvious offside position that eventually contributed to Karpaty's denial of a promotion. Karpaty were trailing 0–1 already after the first 20 minutes and were not able to equalize by the end of the half, but numerous Karpaty fans drove their team forward.

The torches are being inflamed on stadium stands. Afar, a banner is sparkling: "The Cup for Lviv!" On it, the traditional Lviv lion holds the highest of the national football awards. And now, after the reception of the Cup, the winners are walking around the green field of the Luzhniki...

— "Lvivsky Zaliznychnyk" newspaper (21 August 1969)

When we went out for a warm-up, there sat a sector of Lviv fans, some four thousand people. And the "Cheremshyna" was played on the accordion.

(Petro Danylchuk, "Karpaty" defender)

...That song [with the lyrics] – "again the cheremshyna will be blooming...", that sounded over the stadium, did something incredible to us – from that excitement my tears came up...

(Ihor Kulchytsky, "Karpaty" captain)

In the second half, the Ukrainians broke the course of the game flow, and two goals from Lykhachov and Bulhakov put the Lions ahead. Near the end of the game, the Rostov team scored another goal, but it was ruled offside. The match referee, without consulting his assistants, initially allowed the goal, and the Russians ran joyfully towards the center of the field. However, a moment later, he noticed the raised flag from Härms, who had identified an offside, and reversed his decision, awarding the victory to Lviv.

In the following season, Karpaty's first opponent in the UEFA Cup Winners' Cup was Romanian Steaua București that, led by István Kovács, advanced on a 4–3 aggregate.

=== Soviet Top League (1970–1977) ===
In 1970–77 and 1980, Karpaty played in the Soviet Top League. Karpaty's best achievement was 4th place in 1976. Karpaty placed 4th twice that year since the season was split into two separate championships (spring and fall). Karpaty were primed to win silver that season, but an unexpected loss in their last home game to Zenit Leningrad pushed Karpaty back into fourth place.

While playing in the Soviet First League in 1979, Karpaty were close to repeating their 1969 achievement, when they met Dynamo Moscow in the Soviet Cup semi-final. The match, which was played in Moscow, went into overtime with a 1–1 score with Dynamo prevailing in the end, scoring a penalty kick in extra time.

=== Merger and period of SKA Karpaty (1981–1989) ===
In 1981, Karpaty were merged with another city team, SKA Lviv belonging to the Carpathian Military District and part of the Soviet Union Sports Society of the Armed Forces. In 1980 Karpaty were relegated from the Soviet Top League (Vysshaya Liga) and in the 1981 Soviet First League placed only 11th. Already before the season's finish there appeared rumors about possible merger. The logic of authors of that decision was in following, the city is receiving one, but strong and competitive team. In January 1982 the leaders of regional football ultimately decided to unite two clubs. It was motivated by the fact that it is difficult to finance two teams. As a result, Karpaty were liquidated and their place in the Soviet First League was taken by army team SKA Karpaty that was established in place of SKA Lvov. The new team was gathered from players of SKA, Karpaty, and several other who have recently arrived. The head coach became Russian Nikolay Samarin. It is believed that Ukrainian and Soviet coach Valeriy Lobanovskyi commented on liquidation of Karpaty, that it is a disaster of football in all western region of the republic. That it would take not single decade before they realize the whole tragedy of this merger.

The newly created SKA Karpaty were playing in red and white colors, and traditional green and white colors were banned. Militsiya were watching that fans would not bring to stands any green markings. The club's attendance fell immediately. Back in 1980 the Karpaty's home games were visited on average by 20-25 thousands spectators. In the first season after merging of the Lviv teams at stadium were gathering about 5-6 thousands spectators. The newly arrived footballers also did not stay long with the army club and were leaving as soon as their military service was terminated.

SKA Karpaty continued playing in the Soviet First League until 1989, getting close to promotion in 1986, when CSKA Moscow was promoted ahead of Karpaty on goal difference. As their highest achievement, SKA Karpaty placed third twice while being coached by Volodymyr Bulhakov. After that, their performance worsened. In 1987, the club managed to place fifth, but after two more years, it dropped to last place. It lost 18 of its 21 away games, and its losing streak reached 15 games [5]. Only 54 spectators came to watch one of the home games, which was the absolute anti-record of the season.

=== Revival ===
The Karpaty's revival started with publication in a newspaper. In 1983 journalist and writer Ivan Salo wrote a critical article, "Football... outside of play" (Ukrainian: Футбол...поза грою, in Ukrainian the phrase "outside of play" is actually used for football term of offside). Now due to censorship in the Soviet Union, it dared to be printed only in four years in newspaper "Leninska molod" (The Lenin's Youth). The author was demanding to separate SKA Karpaty into two teams as it was earlier. The subject was expanded by "Sportyvna Hazeta" (The Sports Gazette). In November–December 1988 the publisher held a rally "Ya, mama, tato – za komandu Karpaty" (Mother, father and I – for the Karpaty team). The newspaper succeeded to gather 70,000 signatures from the whole Ukraine. After that the case actually moved from standstill. The Lviv delegation departed to Kyiv for negotiations with republican football federation (Ukrainian SSR, precursor of UAF). Negotiations also were held with Moscow.

Finally on 5 January 1989 at 15:00 in office No.290 of the State Committee on Sports of the Soviet Union at Luzhniki Embankment in Moscow was signed the certificate about revival of the Karpaty football team. His signature placed the future president of the Football Federation of the Soviet Union Vyacheslav Koloskov. And on 10 January in "Sportyvna Hazeta" was printed a text titled "The birthday of the club". It has been seven years from the moment of the Karpaty's liquidation. The Lions began to play from the Second League (Zone 5, not Zone 6 with the rest "Ukrainian" teams), and SKA continued to play in the First.

The revival of the club was taken over by leadership of the Elektron Factory (television manufacturer), at facilities of which in 1963 Karpaty were actually created. In 2019 already the late Yuriy Dyachuk-Stavytskyi was telling, "At that time I worked as a head coach of Prykarpattia Ivano-Frankivsk. To Lviv I was invited along with Rostyslav Zaremba (at that time he headed a club of the Karpaty football fans). We were told: The club must be moved ahead [with establishment]", said Dyachuk-Stavytskyi. "For office we were given a space at vulytsia Dudaieva. On the third story there were two rooms. We found couple of chairs and a coffee table for magazines. I brought my personal typewriter as many people remember it. My friends laughed at me telling "Why do you need all this?" The same thing they said to Rostyslav as both of us came to an empty lot de facto".

"However", continued Dyachuk-Stavytskyi, "in renewed Karpaty was gathered a battle-ready team since to Lviv returned a good number of local "fosterlings" (former recruits) such as Stepan Yurchyshyn, Serhiy Kvasnykov, Viktor Rafalchuk, Hryhoriy Batych, Vasyl Leskiv, Bohdan Bandura and others. A squad chief (nachalnik komandy) became Ihor Kulchytskyi, as a head coach was appointed Borys Rossykhin, while his assistant became Rostyslav Potochniak. Companies were transferring us their funds, and people were simply bringing in their caps their money that they gathered at the city's streets. So, I ask you not to be confused, the football team was created in 1963, and the club – in 1989", said Dyachuk-Stavytskyi. (Many football teams were forced to adopt the Soviet policy of khozraschyot during that period, some earlier than others.) "Those are two important historical dates".

=== Ukrainian League (1991–present) ===
Since Ukraine gained its independence, Karpaty have primarily participated in Ukrainian Premier League competitions. They reached 3rd place in 1997–98, their highest Ukrainian top division finish to date, and were Ukrainian Cup runners-up twice, losing both times to Dynamo Kyiv in the final.

The thirteenth season in Ukrainian Premier League became an unfortunate one for Karpaty and in the 2003–04 season the team was relegated to the Persha Liha. However, Karpaty remained there only for two seasons, and in the 2005–06 season, the club was successful in taking second place in the Persha Liha, which promoted them to the Vyscha Liha the following year.

In August 2017, the president of the club Petro Dyminskyi while driving near Lviv ran into another car, killing a young lady. A few days later he left Ukraine on a private jet as the police started the investigation. In December 2017, the district court in Kyiv gave an order to detain him and asked Interpol for assistance. In 2018 Dyminskyi appealed to Interpol to ignore the request. Dyminskyi is still at large and hiding.

It was then that Oleh Smaliychuk became one of the main executives of the club as a vice-president. Karpaty avoided relegation in the previous 2016–17 season due to administrative sanctions that were imposed against FC Dnipro. In June 2017, Karpaty replaced its head coach with foreign specialist Sergio Navarro, while Argentinian Dario Drudi, who had recently worked in FC Zirka Kropyvnytskyi, became the club's executive director. Several Spanish-speaking players were also brought to the club.

The club poorly started its 2017–18 season losing at home to the newly promoted NK Veres Rivne that temporarily moved to Lviv (1:6) which led fans to request players to undress their uniforms and stop disgracing the club's colors. Following the loss Navarro resigned and was replaced with Serhiy Zaytsev, but that did not help a lot. The club still struggled and after the away cup game loss against the Second League FC Prykarpattia Ivano-Frankivsk (1:2), the club's hooligans began mass riots at the stadium, brawl with the local police, and stopped the bus with the returning Karpaty near Lviv. Following another home loss to FC Mariupol and remaining in 11th place (out of 12), Zaitsev left the post and was replaced Oleh Boychyshyn. The new coach managed to improve the club's table standing during the second half, and the club cleared the relegation zone.

Following a partially poor start in 2018–19 with two home losses in four games, Boychyshyn was replaced with José Morais. The club's form did not improve much, and after two surprising away wins against FC Dynamo Kyiv and FC Chornomorets Odesa, Karpaty still continued to struggle to clear the relegation zone. At the end of November 2018 the Portuguese head coach left for Korea, and Boychyshyn took over as interim. However, before the end of the half the club following this coach swap returned to the relegation zone. During the winter break, the club brought in another Spanish specialist, Fabri González who was supposed to refresh the club; however, his efforts were meager, and the club remained in 10th place. Fabri also failed to win against FC Inhulets Petrove in the domestic quarterfinals that played in a tier lower. Just before the finish Fabri was replaced with Oleksandr Chyzhevskyi who managed to win against the struggling FC Arsenal Kyiv and relegation play-off against FC Volyn Lutsk. An excellent season had a prospect player Marian Shved who just turned 22 and finished the season third on the top scorers list with 14 tallies. He also was traded away to the Scottish Celtic F.C., but remained with Karpaty on loan until the season's end.

=== The 2020 crisis ===
As in the previous season, the club again struggled to get out of the relegation zone in 2019–20 season. Although the league was scheduled to expand the following season, which would reduce the number of relegated teams, this did not help Karpaty. After 6 games, the club remained 11th out of 12, and their head coach, Oleksandr Chyzhevskyi, was replaced with Roman Sanzhar. The change of coaches was not successful, as the club, by the midway point of the season, hit the bottom of the table and was eliminated from the domestic cup in the first round against Inhulets Petrove.

As the club was leaving for the winter break, the COVID-19 pandemic started to develop. The competitions resumed before the introduction of quarantine, and the UPL managed to finish the competition's first stage, with Karpaty finishing dead last. Soon after the UPL had started its second stage of competitions, all sports events in Ukraine were placed on hold. After two months of quarantine, the UPL competitions resumed on 30 May 2020. Right before the restart of competitions, there appeared information that the Karpaty owner Petro Dyminskyi sold the club to the club's vice-president, Oleh Smaliychuk. Former head coach and native of Lviv, Myron Markevych expressed his skepticism about it, stating that Dyminskyi possibly may continue to manage the club.

Soon after the restart, positive test results of COVID-19 were found in the Lviv team camp, so the UPL administration decided not to hold the match Karpaty – Mariupol on 31 May 2020. FC Mariupol, which was already on the way to the game, was forced to turn around. On 2 June 2020, FC Karpaty Lviv released its official statement announcing that the club would go on a two-week self-isolation due to the mass spread of the illness among players. The following games with SC Dnipro-1 and Vorskla Poltava did not take place as previously scheduled. On 26 June 2020, new rescheduled dates for Karpaty's games against Mariupol and Dnipro-1. About a month later, on 27 June, they finally met in a derby game against FC Lviv and promised to finish all the games they owed to other clubs before the new end of season on 19 July. But later Karpaty started to complain that the schedule is too tight and they won't be able to comply with the new schedule, and refused to travel to any other games at all, leaving on early vacations on 10 July.

On 30 June 2020, the Ukrainian Premier League filed a document to the UAF Control and Disciplinary Committee informing that FC Karpaty Lviv were unable to show up for the game in Mariupol on 1 July 2020. The Mariupol–Karpaty game scheduled on 4 July will not take place. As it was the second failure to appear at the match for FC Karpaty Lviv, according to regulations, the club was expelled from the championship by the UAF Control-Disciplinary Committee on 9 July 2020. The club was counted as having two technical defeats for two matches against FC Mariupol as 3:0 and 0:3. For all other remaining games that were due to be played, the club was counted as having lost. On 22 July, the UAF decision became final as the club did not appeal it.

On 31 July 2020, Smaliychuk announced that Karpaty would play in the Second League. On 14 August 2020, it was announced that the club never submitted registration for either the First or Second leagues. Six days later, it was confirmed that Karpaty would actually be playing in the Second League. Karpaty became the first club in Ukrainian football history which were allowed to keep their professional license, having a multi-million dollar debt. The head deputy of the licensing department, Serhiy Zadiran, explained that Karpaty provided a clear financial plan to overcome the debt.

=== 2021 club reorganization ===
Former crest (2020–2021)

The club underwent a considerable transformation in the summer of 2021. Owned by Petro Dyminskyi between 2001 and 2020, Karpaty was claimed by Oleh Smaliychuk, either partially or entirely. In 2020, the club announced its bankruptcy and was expelled from the Ukrainian Premier League, yet was allowed to enter competitions in lower leagues and maintain professional status. In the autumn of 2020, veteran Karpaty Lviv players Stepan Yurchyshyn, Andriy Tlumak, and others created another club by the same name that entered the national amateur competitions.

The next season, the Smaliychuk's Karpaty were relegated and finally announced to be dissolved - Yurchyshyn's Karpaty were promoted to take their place in the league. During the 2020–21 Ukrainian Second League, Karpaty temporarily played with a different logo.

On 14 July 2021, Smaliychuk announced that the club was dissolved and would not participate in the amateur championship after being relegated from the Second League. He promised to continue the work by repaying the club's old debts.

=== 2023 Karpaty's appeal to CAS ===
In 2023, Karpaty filed an appeal with CAS against the FIFA decision, claiming that the 2020 Karpaty are the same as the 1963 (original) Karpaty. The appeal was related to the Karpaty debts towards Cristóbal Márquez. FIFA During the appeal, Karpaty argued that FC Karpaty Halych are the successor of the 1963 (original) Karpaty. The CAS denied the appeal.

== Stadiums ==
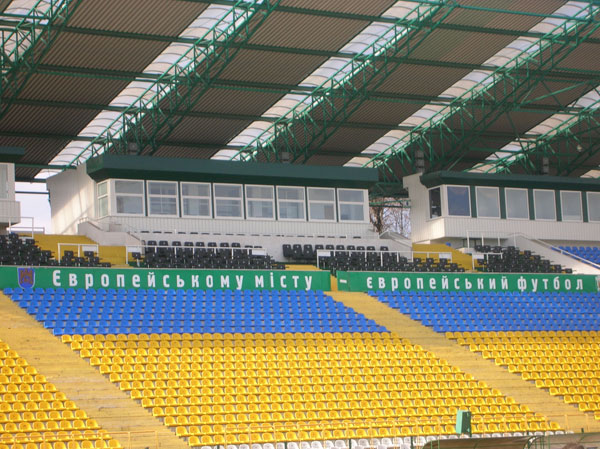
Ukraina Stadium

Main articles: Ukraina Stadium and Arena Lviv

FC Karpaty plays its home games at the Ukraina Stadium. The stadium was built in 1963 as Druzhba ('Friendship') Stadium and renamed Ukraina Stadium in 1992. The stadium has been renovated on several occasions since, the latest one taking place in 2001. Currently the arena has a capacity of 29,004 spectators.

The stadium was also the venue hosting the final match of the first Ukrainian Premier League season in 1992, in which Tavriya Simferopol defeated Dynamo Kyiv.

It has also been one of the venues for Ukraine national football team matches, the most recent being a 1–0 win over Belarus on 6 September 2008 during 2010 FIFA World Cup qualifying.

== Reserves and the Academy ==
=== Karpaty-3 ===
Karpaty-3 was a second reserve team of a Ukrainian football club Karpaty Lviv from Lviv, Ukraine. Created in 1997, until 2001 it played as Karpaty-2 Lviv.

In 2001, due to the merger between FC Karpaty Lviv and FC Lviv, Karpaty preserved the place of FC Lviv in the First League and transformed the former FC Lviv into the new Karpaty-2. The other Karpaty-2 Lviv that competed in the Second League was renamed to Karpaty-3.

In 2003 Karpaty-3 Lviv was renamed Karpaty-Halychyna Lviv, coincidentally FC Halychyna Drohobych relegated that year from the professional ranks. In 2004 Karpaty-Halychyna Lviv was taken out of competitions due to the relegation of its senior squad from the Ukrainian Premier League. Since then, the team has not been revived.

Season	Div.	Pos.	Pl.	W	D	L	GS	GA	P	Domestic Cup	Europe	Notes
2001–02	3rd "A"	9	36	14	11	11	38	31	53			
2002–03	3rd "A"	10	28	8	8	12	24	33	32			
2003–04	3rd "A"	14	30	7	7	16	22	36	28			as Halychyna-Karpaty; Relegated

=== Karpaty women's football ===
Karpaty have their own women's team, which they have fielded since 2018. Due to the club reorganization in 2020–21 and the 2022 Russian aggression, the team ceased its participation at the national level. In 2023 Karpaty provided support for another team from Busk, Nadbuzhia.

=== Karpaty reserves (under 21 and 19) ===
Karpaty team of masters has been fielding its reserve team starting from 1971, when it was promoted to the Soviet Vysshaya Liga (Soviet Top League) which competed in the Soviet reserve competition for the top tier and the 2nd tier. The reserve team was liquidated after the team of masters was merged with the Lviv Army Sports Club (SKA Lvov) following the 1981 season.

Since 2006, FC Karpaty has been fielding its junior teams in Ukrainian competitions for reserves, including under-21 and under-19.

==== Achievements ====
- Soviet Top League reserves
  - Third (2): 1972, 1976
- Soviet First League reserves
  - Third: 1978, 1979
- Ukrainian Premier League U–21
  - Winners (1): 2009–10
  - Third (1): 2016–17
- Ukrainian Premier League U–19
  - Third (4): 2013–14, 2014–15, 2017–18, 2018–19

=== Karpaty academy ===
In 2020 the former SDYuShOR Karpaty was reorganized into a community organization, DYuFSh Karpaty, owned by the city of Lviv.

== Logo history ==
Since the club has been named after the Carpathian Mountains, the image of the forest and mountains has been present on team's logo for many years. However, the logo has since been updated, inspired by coat of arms of Lviv with a segment of a fortress and lion shown on the new crest. The club's nickname, 'The Green Lions,' also originated from their new logo.

The club has a ceremonial logo; however, it is very rarely used, mostly during TV broadcasts or video packages.

=== Football kits and sponsors ===
Years	Football kit	Shirt sponsor
1998–99	adidas	–
2000–01	adidas	–
2001–04	adidas	НПК Галичина
2006–07	adidas	–
2007–09	adidas	cdma Ukraine
2008–10	Joma	zik
2010–11	Joma	zik/електрон
2011–12	Joma	лімо
2012–14	Joma	FAVBET
2014–present	Joma	лімо

== Colours ==
Traditionally the club colours have been white and green. Throughout the club's history, its kit has always been designed in green and white colours; other colours are seldom used and are usually highly criticized by fans.

Green is considered to be the dominant of the two in club nicknames like "Green Lions" and "Green-Whites". For some time black was also used and was even displayed on one of the club's former logos.

== Rivalries ==
Karpaty's biggest rivals today are Volyn Lutsk and FC Lviv. The match against FC Volyn Lutsk is called the Galician-Volhynian rivalry (derby) which is the main football event in western Ukraine. The derby with FC Lviv has a shorter history (six matches by the end of 2019)

=== Galician–Volhynian rivalry ===
Galician–Volhynian rivalry

Year	Tournament	Home	Away	Score
1990	Soviet Second League	FC Volyn Lutsk	FC Karpaty Lviv	2:2
1990	Soviet Second League	FC Karpaty Lviv	FC Volyn Lutsk	1:0
1991	Soviet Second League	FC Volyn Lutsk	FC Karpaty Lviv	0:1
1991	Soviet Second League	FC Karpaty Lviv	FC Volyn Lutsk	0:1
13.09.1992	Ukrainian Top League	FC Volyn Lutsk	FC Karpaty Lviv	3:2
23.05.1993	Ukrainian Top League	FC Karpaty Lviv	FC Volyn Lutsk	2:1
05.09.1993	Ukrainian Top League	FC Volyn Lutsk	FC Karpaty Lviv	1:0
28.05.1994	Ukrainian Top League	FC Karpaty Lviv	FC Volyn Lutsk	1:2
22.07.1994	Ukrainian Top League	FC Karpaty Lviv	FC Volyn Lutsk	1:0
19.06.1995	Ukrainian Top League	FC Volyn Lutsk	FC Karpaty Lviv	3:0
05.11.1995	Ukrainian Top League	FC Karpaty Lviv	FC Volyn Lutsk	2:1
13.03.1996	Ukrainian Top League	FC Volyn Lutsk	FC Karpaty Lviv	1:0
01.09.2002	Ukrainian Top League	FC Karpaty Lviv	FC Volyn Lutsk	0:2
04.05.2003	Ukrainian Top League	FC Volyn Lutsk	FC Karpaty Lviv	0:1
25.10.2003	Ukrainian Top League	FC Volyn Lutsk	FC Karpaty Lviv	1:0
27.03.2004	Ukrainian Top League	FC Karpaty Lviv	FC Volyn Lutsk	0:1
30.08.2010	Ukrainian Premier League	FC Karpaty Lviv	FC Volyn Lutsk	1:0
03.04.2011	Ukrainian Premier League	FC Volyn Lutsk	FC Karpaty Lviv	0:3
01.10.2011	Ukrainian Premier League	FC Volyn Lutsk	FC Karpaty Lviv	0:2
16.04.2012	Ukrainian Premier League	FC Karpaty Lviv	FC Volyn Lutsk	1:0
13.07.2012	Ukrainian Premier League	FC Volyn Lutsk	FC Karpaty Lviv	1:1
18.11.2012	Ukrainian Premier League	FC Karpaty Lviv	FC Volyn Lutsk	2:0
19.08.2013	Ukrainian Premier League	FC Volyn Lutsk	FC Karpaty Lviv	1:1
15.03.2014	Ukrainian Premier League	FC Karpaty Lviv	FC Volyn Lutsk	0:1
17.08.2014	Ukrainian Premier League	FC Volyn Lutsk	FC Karpaty Lviv	0:2
13.03.2015	Ukrainian Premier League	FC Karpaty Lviv	FC Volyn Lutsk	0:2
27.09.2015	Ukrainian Premier League	FC Karpaty Lviv	FC Volyn Lutsk	0:2
17.04.2016	Ukrainian Premier League	FC Volyn Lutsk	FC Karpaty Lviv	0:0
02.10.2016	Ukrainian Premier League	FC Volyn Lutsk	FC Karpaty Lviv	1:1
11.03.2017	Ukrainian Premier League	FC Karpaty Lviv	FC Volyn Lutsk	

=== Former rivalries ===
Karpaty became the longest surviving city's professional football club and over the years participated in Lviv city derbies with SKA Lvov (in 1966–1969) before the club was dissolved.

In the beginning of the 1990s, a rivalry with FC Nyva Ternopil became overshadowed by the rivalry with FC Volyn Lutsk as the Ternopil club was relegated from the top division in 2001.

== Supporters ==
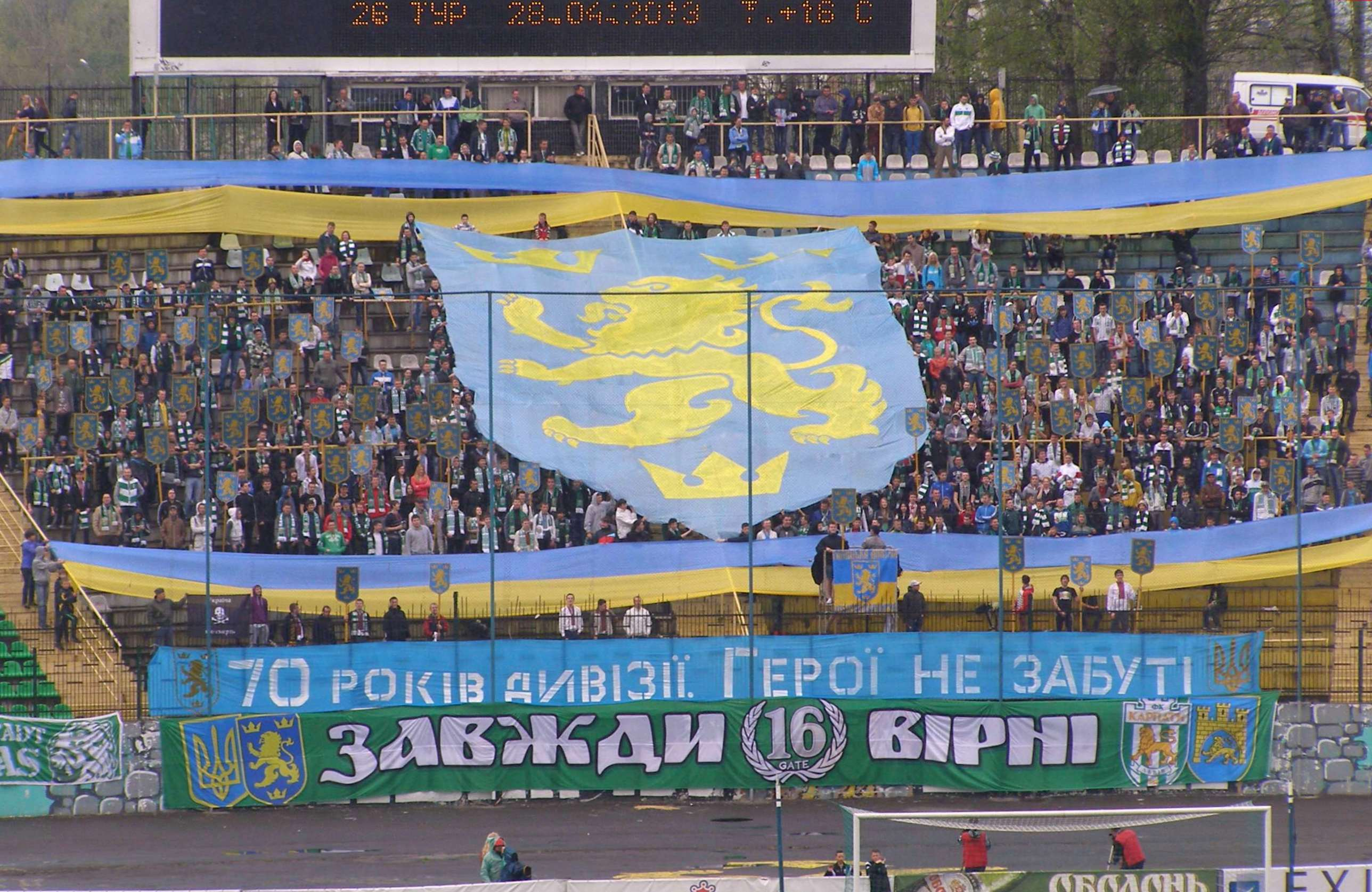
Fans of the FC Karpaty Lviv football club honoring the Waffen-SS Galizien division, in Lviv, Ukraine, 2013

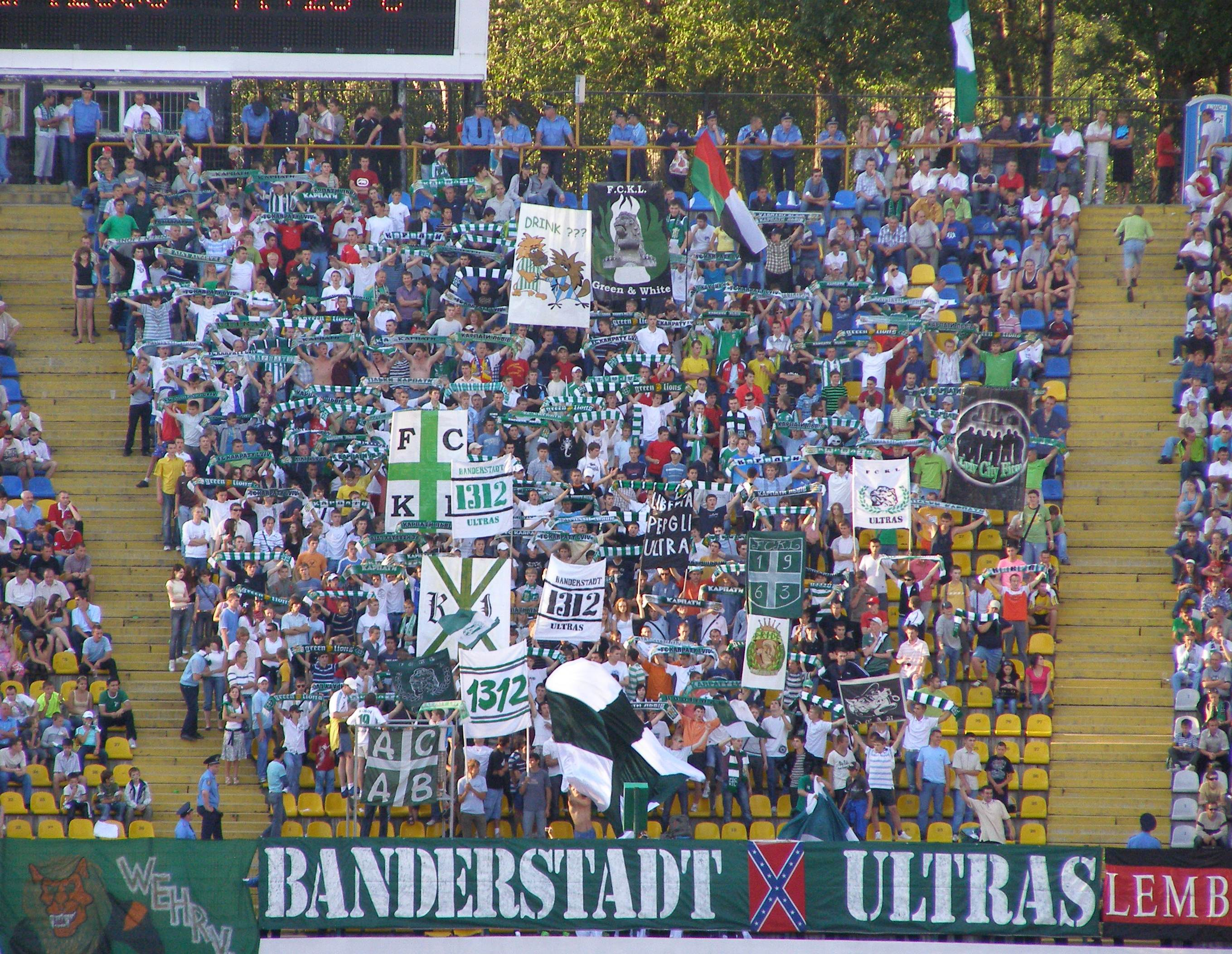
The Banderstadt Ultras group in 2008

Karpaty Lviv is among the most popular clubs in Ukraine and according to social polls of local polling organizations such as "RATING" and KIIS that were conducted in 2013 it was claimed that 2.7% to 5.6% of all football fans in Ukraine support the club (sharing the 3rd-5th place in the country).

Just before being appointed a director of the Moscow studio of Deutsche Welle, German journalist Markus Reher wrote an article in which he claimed that Ukraine is not ready to hold an event such as 2012 UEFA Euro, because there are too many "nationalist thugs" and neo-Nazis, particularly referring to Karpaty supporters. In the article an interviewed Karpaty supporter claims that supporters of the club "don't start fights" and are "just giving their team support". The supporter went on to say that "everything'll be fine" if supporters of other clubs don't provoke him or other supporters of Karpaty Lviv, and if they had foreign players at the club, they would send them back home if they could. The article claimed that the club protects its players from its nationalist fans, and Danilo Avelar, a player from Brazil, stated that he "hasn't heard of nationalist fans and hopes it isn't true". The article goes on to report that authorities have had problems in the past with violent fans in Lviv, citing a riot in Lviv's old town when ultranationalist Karpaty supporters clashed with supporters of German side Borussia Dortmund with injuries on both sides. Detailing the pre-independence history of the team, British correspondent Manuel Veth notes that the nickname Banderstadt later adopted by football ultras was given by "Soviet anti-terrorist forces" for the city's role in the Ukrainian Insurgent Army's nationalist guerrilla campaign. The American journalist Michael Goldfarb pointed out that demonstration of antisemitism and xenophobia among the Karpaty Lviv fans could be politically influenced and is not uncommon in region including similar instances in neighboring Poland.

== FC Karpaty Lviv in European competitions ==
Karpaty made its debut in European tournaments at the 1970–71 European Cup Winners' Cup, being eliminated by FC Steaua București in the first round. Karpaty became the second Ukrainian club in history to qualify for the European club competitions ahead of such other Ukrainian clubs like Shakhtar and Dnipro. Just four visits to European competition have followed, the most successful being a run to the Group Stage of the 2010–11 UEFA Europa League.

Season	Competition	Round	Club	Home	Away	Aggregate
1970–71	UEFA Cup Winners' Cup	First round	(Romania) FC Steaua București	0–1	3–3	3–4
1993–94	UEFA Cup Winners' Cup	Qualifying round	(Republic of Ireland) Shelbourne F.C.	1–0	1–3	2–3
1999–00	UEFA Cup	First Round	(Sweden) Helsingborgs IF	1–1 (a.e.t.)	1–1	2–2 (2–4 p)
2010–11	UEFA Europa League	Second Qualifying Round	(Iceland) KR Reykjavík	3–2	3–0	6–2
2010–11	UEFA Europa League	Third Qualifying Round	(Georgia (country)) FC Zestaponi	1–0	1–0	2–0
2010–11	UEFA Europa League	Playoff Round	(Turkey) Galatasaray S.K.	1–1	2–2	3–3 (a)
2010–11	UEFA Europa League	Group Stage (Group J)	(France) Paris Saint-Germain F.C.	1–1	0–2	4th
2010–11	UEFA Europa League	Group Stage (Group J)	(Spain) Sevilla FC	0–1	0–4	4th
2010–11	UEFA Europa League	Group Stage (Group J)	(Germany) Borussia Dortmund	3–4	0–3	4th
2011–12	UEFA Europa League	Third Qualifying Round	(Republic of Ireland) St Patrick's Athletic F.C.	2–0	3–1	5–1
2011–12	UEFA Europa League	Playoff Round	(Greece) PAOK FC	1–1	0–2	1–3

=== UEFA club coefficient ranking ===
As of 06.06.2016 (no ranking for 2017), Source:

Rank	Team	Points
158	(Czech Republic) FK Jablonec	10.585
159	(Moldova) FC Sheriff Tiraspol	10.575
160	(Ukraine) FC Karpaty Lviv	10.476
161	(Cyprus) Apollon Limassol FC	10.435
162	(Denmark) Aalborg BK	10.220

== Honours ==
=== Domestic ===
==== Soviet Union ====
- Soviet Cup
  - Winners (1): 1969
- Soviet First League
  - Winners (2): 1970, 1979
- Soviet Second League
  - Winners (1): 1991 (Zone West)

==== Ukraine ====
- Ukrainian Cup
  - Runners-up (2): 1992–93, 1998–99
- Ukrainian First League
  - Runners-up (2): 2004–05, 2023–24
- Ukrainian Second League
  - Winners (1): 2021–22

=== Non-official ===
- Copa del Sol
  - Winners (1): 2011

== Players ==
=== Current squad ===
As of 1 September 2026

Note: Flags indicate national team as defined under FIFA eligibility rules; some limited exceptions apply. Players may hold more than one non-FIFA nationality.

No.	Pos.	Nation	Player
1	GK	UKR	Denys Marchenko
2	DF	UKR	Mykola Kyrychok
4	DF	MDA	Vladislav Baboglo
5	DF	UKR	Andriy Buleza
7	MF	BRA	Fellipe Vieira
8	MF	UKR	Ambrosiy Chachua
9	FW	FRA	Joseph Séry
10	MF	ESP	Moha Moukhliss
11	DF	UKR	Denys Miroshnichenko (captain)
14	DF	ESP	Iván Calero
16	MF	UKR	Ivan Chaban
17	DF	UKR	Roman Vantukh
18	MF	BRA	Eriki
19	FW	UKR	Yaroslav Karabin

No.	Pos.	Nation	Player
20	MF	UKR	Marko Sapuha
21	MF	ESP	Bruno Iglesias
22	DF	UKR	Yuriy Kokodynyak
26	MF	UKR	Yan Kostenko
31	FW	UKR	Nazariy Rusyn
36	GK	UKR	Anton Zhylkin
44	DF	UKR	Vitaliy Kholod
47	DF	BRA	Jean Pedroso
55	DF	UKR	Tymur Stetskov
70	FW	ESP	Xeber Alkain
73	DF	UKR	Rostyslav Lyakh
77	FW	ESP	Joaquinete
80	GK	UKR	Roman Mysak
99	GK	UKR	Yuriy-Volodymyr Hereta

=== Out on loan ===
Note: Flags indicate national team as defined under FIFA eligibility rules; some limited exceptions apply. Players may hold more than one non-FIFA nationality.

No.	Pos.	Nation	Player
—	DF	UKR	Bohdan Levytskyi (at Rukh Lviv until 30 June 2027)
—	MF	BRA	Edson Fernando (at (Brazil) Remo until 31 December 2026)
—	MF	UKR	Artur Shakh (at (Poland) Lechia Gdańsk until 30 June 2027)

No.	Pos.	Nation	Player
—	FW	BRA	Fabiano (at (Brazil) Palmeiras U20 until 1 February 2027)
—	FW	UKR	Illya Kvasnytsya (at Livyi Bereh Kyiv until 30 June 2027)

== Staff and management ==
Administration	Coaching (senior team)	Coaching (U-19 team)
General manager – (Ukraine) Andriy Rusol; Executive director – (Ukraine) Andriy Tlumak; Karpaty Arena director – (Ukraine) Andrian Klishch; Director of development – (Ukraine) Andriy Tlumak; Academy manager – (Spain) Andoni Bombin	Head coach – (Spain) Fran Fernández; Assistant coach – (Ukraine) Serhiy Lavrynenko; Assistant coach – (Spain) Vicente Fuster Ruiz; Assistant coach – (Spain) Juan Carlos Cintas; Chief analyst – (Ukraine) Bohdan Khorkavyi; Fitness coach – (Ukraine) Vadym Sapay; Goalkeeping coach – (Ukraine) Bohdan Shust; Goalkeeping coach – (Ukraine) Yuriy Shevchuk; Performance manager – (Spain) Jon Maza Álvarez; Scout – (Ukraine) Mykhaylo Kopolovets	Senior coach – (Ukraine) Oleh Holodyuk; Assistant coach – (Ukraine) Andriy Sapuha; Assistant coach – (Ukraine) Denys Kozhanov; Goalkeeping coach – (Ukraine) Vladyslav Leonidov

== Administration history ==
=== President ===
- 1998–1999: Yaroslav Hrytsyuk
- 1999–2001: Leonid Tkachuk
- 2001–2020: Petro Dyminskyi
- 2020–2021: Oleh Smaliychuk

=== General director ===
- 1999–2001: Ivan Lypnytskyi
- 2001: Oleksandr Yefremov
- 2001–2004: Mykhaylo Praktyka
- 2004: Petro Komar
- 2004–2005: Yuriy Dyachuk-Stavytskyi
- 2005–2006: Bohdan Fedoryshyn
- 2006: Vasyl Ravryk
- 2006–2008: Oleksandr Yefremov
- 2008–2009: Yuriy Dyachuk-Stavytskyi
- 2009: Yuriy Korotysh
- 2009–2015: Ihor Dedyshyn
- 2015–2017: Yuriy Dyachuk-Stavytskyi
- 2017–2020: Yuriy Korotysh
- 2020–present: Stepan Yurchyshyn

== League and Cup history ==
=== Divisional movements ===
League	Years	Last	Promotions	Relegations
Top	8	1980	1 time to Europe	▼2 (1980)
First	11	1981	▲2 (1979)	▼1 (1981)
Second	3	1991	never	never
22 years of professional football in Soviet Union since 1963
Premier	27	2019–20	4 times to Europe	▼2 (2019–20)
First	3	2022–23	▲1 (2005–06)	never
Second	1	2021–22	▲1 (2021–22)	never
31 years of professional football in Ukraine since 1992

== Coaches ==
=== First team ===
- (Soviet Union) Sergei Korshunov (1964–65)
- (Soviet Union) Nikolay Dementyev (1965–66)
- (Ukrainian Soviet Socialist Republic) Yevhen Lemeshko (1967)
- (Soviet Union) Valentin Bubukin (1972–74)
- (Ukrainian Soviet Socialist Republic) Ishtvan Sekech (1978–80)
- (Ukraine) Stepan Yurchyshyn (1992)
- (Ukraine) Myron Markevych (1 July 1992 – 30 June 1995)
- (Ukraine) Volodymyr Zhuravchak (1995–96), (2002)
- (Ukraine) Myron Markevych (1 July 1996 – 1 March 1999)
- (Ukraine) Stepan Yurchyshyn (1999)
- (Ukraine) Lev Brovarskyi (1999–00)
- (Ukraine) Stepan Yurchyshyn (2001)
- (Ukraine) Myron Markevych (1 July 2001 – 30 June 2002)
- (Ukraine) Valentyn Khodukin (Sept 15, 2002 – 31 Dec 2002)
- (Ukraine) Myron Markevych (1 Jan 2003 – 30 June 2004)
- (Ukraine) Valentyn Khodukin (July 2004 – Sept 2004)
- (Ukraine) Yuriy Dyachuk-Stavytskyi (Sept 15, 2004 – 30 June 2006)
- (Ukraine) Oleksandr Ishchenko (1 July 2006 – 1 Jan 2008)
- (Ukraine) Valeriy Yaremchenko (1 Jan 2008 – 30 May 2008)
- (Russia) Oleg Kononov (20 May 2008 – 18 Oct 2011)
- (Russia) Pavel Kucherov (interim) (18 Oct 2011 – 21 Jan 2012)
- (Ukraine) Volodymyr Sharan (21 Jan 2012 – 26 March 2012)
- (Ukraine) Yuriy Dyachuk-Stavytskyi (26 March 2012 – 8 June 2012)
- (Russia) Pavel Kucherov (interim) (8 June 2012 – 30 July 2012)
- (Bulgaria) Nikolay Kostov (29 July 2012 – 10 May 2013)
- (Ukraine) Yuriy Dyachuk-Stavytskyi (interim) (10 May 2013 – 18 June 2013)
- (Ukraine) Oleksandr Sevidov (19 June 2013 – 17 June 2014)
- (Croatia) Igor Jovićević (caretaker) (18 June 2014 – 1 September 2015)
- (Croatia) Igor Jovićević (1 September 2015 – 12 January 2016)
- (Ukraine) Oleh Luzhnyi / Volodymyr Bezubyak (Jan 2016 – June 2016)
- (Ukraine) Valeriy Yaremchenko (June, 6 – 17 June 2016)
- (Ukraine) Anatoliy Chantsev (caretaker) (17 June 2016 – 5 July 2016)
- (Ukraine) Serhiy Zaytsev (5 July 2016 – 7 October 2016)
- (Belarus) Oleg Dulub (7 October 2016 – 11 June 2017)
- (Spain) Sergio Navarro (16 June 2017 – 14 Sep 2017)
- (Ukraine) Serhiy Zaytsev (14 Sep 2017 – 19 Nov 2017)
- (Argentina) Dario Drudi (caretaker) (19 Nov 2017 – 21 Nov 2017)
- (Ukraine) Oleh Boychyshyn (21 Nov 2017 – 16 Aug 2018)
- (Portugal) José Morais (16 Aug 2018 – 28 Nov 2018)
- (Ukraine) Oleh Boychyshyn (caretaker) (28 Nov 2018 – 13 Jan 2019)
- (Spain) Fabri González (13 Jan 2019 – 27 May 2019)
- (Ukraine) Oleksandr Chyzhevskyi (27 May 2019 – 3 Sep 2019)
- (Ukraine) Roman Sanzhar (3 Sep 2019 – 29 July 2020)
- (Ukraine) Lyubomyr Vovchuk (23 August 2020 – 14 July 2021)
- (Ukraine) Andriy Tlumak (October 2020 – 2023)
- (Ukraine) Myron Markevych (2023 – 2024)
- (Ukraine) Vladyslav Lupashko (2024 – 2025)
- (Spain) Fran Fernández (2026 – present)

=== Reserve team ===
- (Ukraine) Roman Tolochko (2007 – 2013)
- (Ukraine) Andriy Kuptsov (2013 – 2015)
- (Ukraine) Andriy Tlumak (2016)
- (Ukraine) Oleksandr Chyzhevskyi (2016 – 2019)

=== Notable managers ===
- Ernest Yust, Soviet Cup, Class A (pervaya gruppa) winner, Soviet Top League fourth place
- Ishtvan Sekech, Soviet First League winner
- Stepan Yurchyshyn, Soviet Second League winner
- Myron Markevych, Ukrainian Top League third place

== See also ==
- Reserves: FC Karpaty-2 Lviv
- EUROFANZ
- Ukraina Lwów
- FC Karpaty Halych
