= Top 10 Athletes of Ukraine =

Top 10 Athletes of Ukraine (Ukrainian: 10 найкращих спортсменів України) is an annual survey conducted by the Association of Sports Journalists of Ukraine (ASJU). While originally, the survey was done by Ukraine's sports newspaper Sportyvna Hazeta, it has been done by ASJU since 2000, following the discontinuation of said newspaper.

== Results ==
=== 2001 ===
Rank	Athlete	Sport
1	Zhanna Pintusevich-Block	Athletics (Sprinting)
2	Oleksandr Symonenko	Cycling
3	Yana Klochkova	Swimming
4	Ihor Matviienko Yevhen Braslavets	Sailing
5	Oleh Lisohor	Swimming
6	Andriy Shevchenko	Football
7	Vasyl Ivanchuk Ruslan Ponomariov	Chess
8	Wladimir Klitschko	Boxing
9	Oleksandr Beresch	Gymnastics
10	Olena Zubrilova	Biathlon

=== 2002 ===
Rank	Athlete	Sport
1	Yana Klochkova	Swimming
2	Ruslan Ponomariov	Chess
3	Wladimir Klitschko	Boxing
4	Denys Hotfrid	Weightlifting
5	Vitali Klitschko	Boxing
6	Oleh Lisohor	Swimming
7	Elbrus Tedeyev	Wrestling
8	Anna Bessonova	Gymnastics
9	Yuriy Bilonoh	Shot put
10	Andriy Shevchenko	Football

=== 2003 ===
Rank	Athlete	Sport
1	Yana Klochkova	Swimming
2	Volodymyr Lukashenko	Fencing
3	Nataliya Skakun	Weightlifting
4	Natalia Konrad	Fencing
5	Iryna Merleni	Wrestling
6	Vitali Klitschko	Boxing
7	Anna Bessonova	Gymnastics
8	Andriy Shevchenko	Football
9	Viktoria Chuyko	Shooting
10	Artem Udachyn	Weightlifting

=== 2004 ===
Rank	Athlete	Sport
1	Yana Klochkova	Swimming
2	Vitali Klitschko	Boxing
3	Yuriy Bilonoh	Shot put
4	Andriy Shevchenko	Football
5	Elbrus Tedeyev	Wrestling
6	Valeriy Honcharov	Gymnastics
7	Nataliya Skakun	Weightlifting
8	Yuri Nikitin	Gymnastics
9	Iryna Merleni	Wrestling
10	Olena Kostevych	Shooting

=== 2005 ===
Rank	Athlete	Sport
1	Andriy Shevchenko	Football
2	Yuriy Krymarenko	High jump
3	Rodion Luka George Leonchuk	Sailing
4	Serhiy Dzyndzyruk	Boxing
5	Anna Bessonova	Gymnastics
6	Elena Grushina Ruslan Honcharov	Ice skating
7	Iryna Merleni	Wrestling
8	Oleh Lisohor	Swimming
9	Andriy Deryzemlya	Biathlon
10	Vitaliy Bubon	Judo

=== 2006 ===
Rank	Athlete	Sport
1	Wladimir Klitschko	Boxing
2	Elena Grushina Ruslan Honcharov	Ice skating
3	Lilia Vaygina-Efremova	Biathlon
4	Volodymyr Shatskykh	Wrestling
5	Ibragim Aldatov	Wrestling
6	Andriy Shevchenko	Football
7	Iryna Krasnianska	Gymnastics
8	Darya Tkachenko	Checkers
9	Ivan Heshko	Athletics
10	Artem Udachyn	Weightlifting

=== 2007 ===
Rank	Athlete	Sport
1	Anna Bessonova	Gymnastics
2	Wladimir Klitschko	Boxing
3	Lyudmyla Blonska	Heptathlon
4	Ibragim Aldatov	Wrestling
5	Vasiliy Lomachenko	Boxing
6	Vyacheslav Glazkov	Boxing
7	Vasyl Ivanchuk	Chess
8	Yuri Nikitin	Gymnastics
9	Olha Korobka	Weightlifting
10	Andriy Deryzemlya	Biathlon

=== 2008 ===
Rank	Athlete	Sport
1	Vasiliy Lomachenko	Boxing
2	Olga Kharlan	Fencing
3	Vitali Klitschko	Boxing
4	Nataliya Dobrynska	Heptathlon
5	Wladimir Klitschko	Boxing
6	Viktor Ruban	Archery
7	Artur Ayvazyan	Shooting
8	Inna Osypenko-Radomska	Kayaking
9	Oleksandr Petriv	Shooting
10	Vasyl Fedoryshyn	Wrestling

=== 2009 ===
Rank	Athlete	Sport
1	Vasiliy Lomachenko	Boxing
2	Olga Kharlan	Fencing
3	Georgii Zantaraia	Judo
4	Wladimir Klitschko	Boxing
5	Vitali Klitschko	Boxing
6	Artem Udachyn	Weightlifting
7	Yuliya Krevsun	Athletics
8	Andriy Shevchenko	Football
9	Vita Semerenko	Biathlon
10	Illya Kvasha	Diving

=== 2010 ===
Rank	Athlete	Sport
1	Olga Kharlan	Fencing
2	Wladimir Klitschko	Boxing
3	Andriy Pyatov	Football
4	Inna Osypenko-Radomska	Kayaking
5	Vitali Klitschko	Boxing
6	Olha Saladukha	Triple Jump
7	Serhiy Sednev	Biathlon
8	Artem Ivanov	Weightlifting
9	Olha Sukha	Judo
10	Oleg Stepko	Gymnastics

=== 2011 ===
Rank	Athlete	Sport
1	Victoria Tereshchuk	Pentathlon
2	Wladimir Klitschko	Boxing
3	Olha Saladukha	Triple Jump
4	Vasiliy Lomachenko	Boxing
5	Artem Ivanov	Weightlifting
6	Olga Kharlan	Fencing
7	Georgii Zantaraia	Judo
8	Dmytro Kirpulyanskyy	Pentathlon
9	Vita Semerenko	Biathlon
10	Olena Kostevych	Shooting

=== 2012 ===
Rank	Athlete	Sport
1	Yana Shemyakina	Fencing
2	Vasiliy Lomachenko	Boxing
3	Oleksiy Torokhtiy	Weightlifting
4	Oleksandr Usyk	Boxing
5	Iurii Cheban	Rowing
6	Inna Osypenko-Radomska	Kayaking
7	Valeriy Andriytsev	Wrestling
8	Olena Kostevych	Shooting
9	Oleksandr Pyatnytsya	Javelin Throw
10	Anna Ushenina	Chess

=== 2013 ===
Rank	Athlete	Sport
1	Bohdan Bondarenko	High Jump
2	Olga Kharlan	Fencing
3	Wladimir Klitschko	Boxing
4	Olena Bilosiuk	Biathlon
5	Ibragim Aldatov	Wrestling
6	Hanna Melnychenko	Heptathlon
7	Hanna Rizatdinova	Gymnastics
8	Illya Kvasha	Diving
9	Yevhen Konoplyanka	Football
10	Anita Serogina	Karate
