= Oleksandr Yefremov (functionary) =

Ukrainian association football functionary

- Born: Oleksandr Andriyovych Yefremov; 10 April 1948 (age 78); Kryvyi Rih, Ukrainian SSR
- Education: National Metallurgical Academy of Ukraine, Kiev National Economic University
- Occupation: CEO
- Known for: General director, Karpaty Lviv

Oleksandr Yefremov (Ukrainian: Олександр Андрійович Єфремов; born 10 April 1948) is a Ukrainian association football functionary, who worked as a General director of FC Karpaty Lviv (2001, 2006–2008) and a General director of the Ukrainian Premier League (2009).

== Career ==
He graduated from the Dnipropetrovsk Metallurgical Institute (specialization - metallurgical engineer) and the Kiev Institute of National Economy (economist).

He began his career in 1966 at the Chervonyi Zhovten brick factory in his native Kryvyi Rih. From 1967 he worked at the Kryvorizhstal metallurgical plant as a turbocharger driver, electrician and consequently as a head of department. In August 1991, he was appointed Deputy General Director for Economic Affairs (actually held this position since September 1989). Since 1995 - Head of the newly formed marketing department of the plant "Kryvorizhstal". After that he hold the next positions: 1995–1996 – Head of the Ministry of Industrial Policy of Ukraine; 1996–1998 – Deputy Chairman of the Board of the Index Bank; 1999–2001 he was the head of the GHG "Europe-II".

In 2001, when Petro Dyminskyi become a President of FC Karpaty Lviv, Yefremov was invited to head this team as its General Director. His next positions in the association football were: 2002–2004 – Executive Director of the public organization "Karpaty"; again a General Director of FC Karpaty Lviv from 2006 until 2008 and in 2009 he was appointed as a General Director of the Ukrainian Premier League.
