= Ihor Dedyshyn =

Ukrainian football manager, media manager, and journalist

Ihor Dedyshyn (Ukrainian: Ігор Михайлович Дедишин; born 9 March 1977) is a Ukrainian football manager, media manager, and journalist. Dedyshyn was born in Krupsko village, Lviv, Ukraine, and continues to reside in Lviv.

== Biography ==
Education

- 1994–1999 — studied at Lviv National University named after Ivan Franko on Journalism Program. Graduated with Diploma of specialist in Journalism.

Career

- 1999–2001 — Sport journalist, editor of sport department in newspaper “Express”. (Lviv)
- 2001–2002 — Director and editor-in-chief of the national newspaper “Sportpanorama”.
- 2002–2004 — Head of media advertising and publishing department of FC “Karpaty”
- 2004–2006 — Chief of “Karpaty Sport Marketing”.
- 2006–2007 — Commercial director of FC “Karpaty” (Ukraine, Lviv).
- 2007–2009 — Deputy general manager of FC “Karpaty” (Ukraine, Lviv).
- 2009–2015 — General manager of FC “Karpaty”. (Ukraine, Lviv)

Positions

- Member of professional football committee FFU,
- General manager of FC “Karpaty”,
- General manager of media-holding “ZIK”,
- Editor-in-chief of the newspaper “Sportpanorama”.
- Editor of sport department in newspaper “Express” (Lviv).
