= Andriy Pyatov =

Ukrainian footballer (born 1984)

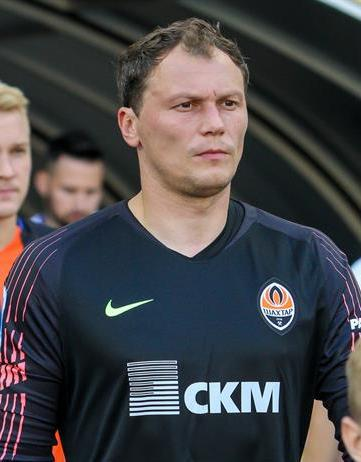
- Pyatov with Shakhtar Donetsk in 2018

Personal information
- Full name: Andriy Valeriyovych Pyatov
- Date of birth: 28 June 1984 (age 42)
- Place of birth: Kirovohrad, Ukrainian SSR, Soviet Union
- Height: 1.90 m (6 ft 3 in)
- Position: Goalkeeper

Team information
- Current team: Shakhtar Donetsk (goalkeeping coach)

Youth career
- Sports School 2 Kirovohrad
- 1998–2000: Zirka Kirovohrad
- 2001: Horpynko Sport School Poltava

Senior career*
Years	Team	Apps	(Gls)
2000	Artemida Kirovohrad	12	(0)
2001–2007	Vorskla Poltava	43	(0)
2001–2004	Vorskla-2 Poltava	56	(0)
2007–2023	Shakhtar Donetsk	301	(0)
Total		412	(0)

International career
2004–2006	Ukraine U21	22	(0)
2007–2022	Ukraine	102	(0)
Medal record
Men's football
Representing Ukraine
UEFA European Under-21 Championship
Runner-up	2006
- * Club domestic league appearances and goals

Andriy Valeriyovych Pyatov (Ukrainian: Андрі́й Вале́рійович Пятов; born 28 June 1984) is a Ukrainian former professional footballer who played as a goalkeeper. He is currently the goalkeeping coach of Ukrainian Premier League club Shakhtar Donetsk.

== Club career ==
=== Artemida Kirovohrad ===
Pyatov started his career in Kirovohrad playing for amateur club Artemida (sponsored by a former local liquor factory Artemida) in the 2000 Amateur League when he was still 15 years old.

=== Vorskla-2 Poltava ===
In 2001 Pyatov moved to Poltava where he at first joined Vorskla Poltava junior teams and its second team in lower leagues. In Poltava he spent five seasons. His debut at professional level Pyatov made for Vorskla-2 during the 2000–01 season in the away game against Elektron Romny on 25 March 2001 in Romny, which his team lost 3–1.

=== Vorskla Poltava ===
His debut in the Vyshcha Liha (now Ukrainian Premier League) for the Vorskla senior squad Pyatov made at the end of the 2002–03 season on 18 June 2003 when Vorskla was hosting Illichivets Mariupol (Note: during winter break the Mariupol team changed from Metalurh to Illichivets, yet footpass of the Ukrainian Association of Football shows the team as Metalurh) in a game that finished with a 1–1 draw.

=== Shakhtar Donetsk ===
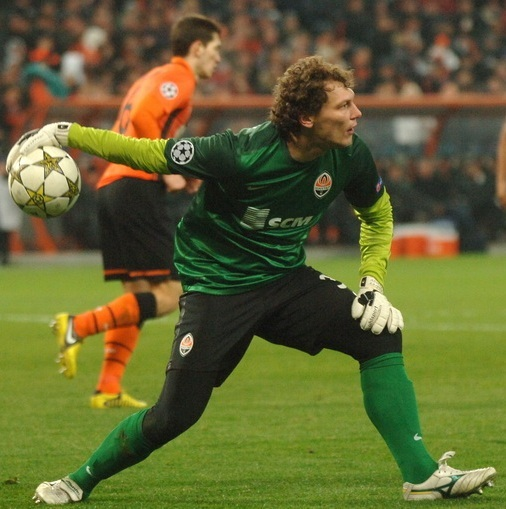
Pyatov with Shakhtar in 2012

He was bought by Shakhtar from Vorskla for approximately £880,000 on 13 December 2006. He spent the rest of the 2006–07 season on loan at Vorskla Poltava. In the 2007–08 season, Pyatov replaced Bohdan Shust as the main goalkeeper of Shakhtar Donetsk, playing in league, cup, and UEFA Champions League matches, keeping two clean sheets. For the 2008–2009 season Pyatov had some serious competition for his No.1 spot as Shakhtar loaned out Bohdan Shust, and signed FC Kharkiv 'keeper Rustam Khudzhamov who was reaching his prime and saved FC Kharkiv from relegation. But after Shakhtars' 2–0 loss to FC Lviv, Pyatov regained his place as the clubs' No.1. In a home Champions League fixture against Barcelona Pyatov made seven crucial saves as Shakhtar were leading 1–0, until Bojan Krkić sent in a cross which was spilled by Pyatov for Lionel Messi to easily tap in to make it 1–1 in the 85th minute. But things went from bad to worse as another cross was sent in, Messi rose and headed home giving Barcelona the win, and ruining Pyatov's perfect game. Pyatov cemented his spot as Shakhtar's No.1 after great performances in the 2008–09 UEFA Cup which saw Shakhtar reach the final, beating fellow Ukrainian giants Dynamo Kyiv in the first ever all Ukrainian semi-final. His appearance in the final was marred as he spilled Naldo's freekick into the net to give Werder Bremen an equaliser but Shakhtar won 2–1 in extra time. On 1 November 2009, against Chornomorets Odesa Pyatov played his 100th game for Shakhtar (conceded 72 goals over the course of these matches), and in this game he won the Man of the Match, and is also the 1st time coach (Mircea Lucescu) ever named a goalkeeper Man of the Match.

In 2015, Pyatov broke the record of penalties stopped in European competitions by stopping his fourth penalty, a record previously held by Shovkovskyi.

Pyatov announced his retirement from professional football on 10 July 2023, after over 500 appearances for club and country. On 6 August, he started in a farewell match against Tottenham Hotspur, before coming off in the 17th minute, as Shakhtar went on to lose 5–1.

== International career ==
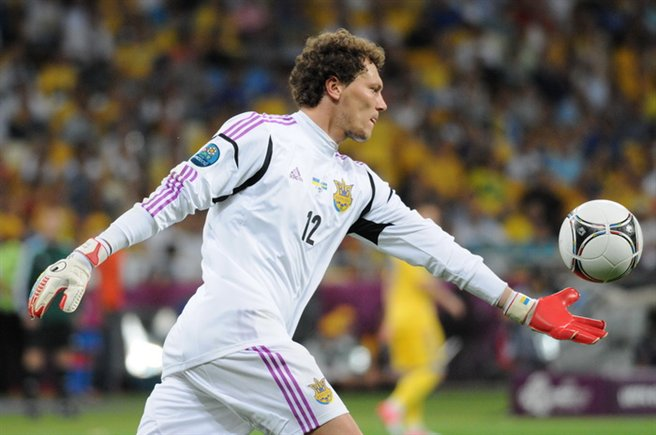
Pyatov playing for Ukraine at UEFA Euro 2012

Pyatov was a member of the Ukraine national U-21 team where he has played 20 matches. He was also part of Ukraine's 2006 World Cup squad which got to the quarter-finals.

Pyatov made his senior debut for Ukraine in 2007. Since then, he had gone on to make 102 appearances for the Ukraine national team. He started the 2010 FIFA World Cup qualifying campaign with a clean sheet against Belarus to help Ukraine win 1–0 in Lviv. In the 0–0 draw against Croatia, Pyatov was instrumental in denying Luka Modrić on two occasions, and as well as other to secure a point for his country. In November 2013 Pyatov set a new record of minutes without a goal for the national team, beating the record of Oleksandr Shovkovskyi.

In May 2021, despite playing a limited role for his club side during the 2020–21 season, Pyatov was included in the final 26-man squad for the delayed UEFA Euro 2020 tournament. He was an unused substitute for all matches as Ukraine went on to lose 4–0 to England in the quarter-finals.

Pyatov played his 102nd and final international match on 11 June 2022, starting in a 3–0 win over Armenia.

== Career statistics ==
=== Club ===
Appearances and goals by club, season and competition
Club	Season	League			National cup		Europe		Other		Total	
Club	Season	Division	Apps	Goals	Apps	Goals	Apps	Goals	Apps	Goals	Apps	Goals
Artemida Kirovohrad	2000	AAFU	12	0	–		–		–		12	0
Vorskla-2 Poltava	2000–01	Druha Liha	1	0	–		–		–		1	0
Vorskla-2 Poltava	2001–02	Druha Liha	16	0	–		–		–		16	0
Vorskla-2 Poltava	2002–03	Druha Liha	15	0	–		–		–		15	0
Vorskla-2 Poltava	2003–04	Druha Liha	22	0	–		–		–		22	0
Vorskla-2 Poltava	2004–05	Druha Liha	2	0	–		–		–		2	0
Vorskla-2 Poltava	Total		56	0	–		–		–		56	0
Vorskla Poltava	2002–03	Vyshcha Liha	1	0	–		–		–		1	0
Vorskla Poltava	2003–04	Vyshcha Liha	–		1	0	–		–		1	0
Vorskla Poltava	2004–05	Vyshcha Liha	1	0	–		–		–		1	0
Vorskla Poltava	2005–06	Vyshcha Liha	11	0	1	0	–		–		12	0
Vorskla Poltava	2006–07	Vyshcha Liha	30	0	1	0	–		–		31	0
Vorskla Poltava	Total		43	0	3	0	–		–		46	0
Shakhtar Donetsk	2007–08	Vyshcha Liha	23	0	4	0	10 (Note: Appearance(s) in UEFA Champions League)	0	1 (Note: Appearance in Ukrainian Super Cup)	0	38	0
Shakhtar Donetsk	2008–09	Ukrainian Premier League	24	0	3	0	17 (Note: Eight appearances in UEFA Champions League, nine appearances in UEFA Europa League)	0	–		44	0
Shakhtar Donetsk	2009–10	Ukrainian Premier League	27	0	2	0	11 (Note: Two appearances in UEFA Champions League, nine appearances in UEFA Europa League)	0	1 (Note: Appearance in UEFA Super Cup)	0	41	0
Shakhtar Donetsk	2010–11	Ukrainian Premier League	29	0	2	0	10	0	1	0	42	0
Shakhtar Donetsk	2011–12	Ukrainian Premier League	10	0	4	0	0	0	1	0	15	0
Shakhtar Donetsk	2012–13	Ukrainian Premier League	22	0	4	0	8	0	1	0	35	0
Shakhtar Donetsk	2013–14	Ukrainian Premier League	16	0	3	0	6 (Note: Six appearances in UEFA Champions League, two appearances in UEFA Europa League)	0	0	0	27	0
Shakhtar Donetsk	2014–15	Ukrainian Premier League	15	0	5	0	8	0	0	0	28	0
Shakhtar Donetsk	2015–16	Ukrainian Premier League	14	0	2	0	8 (Note: Eight appearances in UEFA Champions League, eight appearances in UEFA Europa League)	0	0	0	32	0
Shakhtar Donetsk	2016–17	Ukrainian Premier League	28	0	1	0	10 (Note: Two appearances in UEFA Champions League, eight appearances in UEFA Europa League)	0	1	0	40	0
Shakhtar Donetsk	2017–18	Ukrainian Premier League	31	0	4	0	8	0	1	0	44	0
Shakhtar Donetsk	2018–19	Ukrainian Premier League	27	0	2	0	8 (Note: Six appearances in UEFA Champions League, two appearances in UEFA Europa League)	0	1	0	38	0
Shakhtar Donetsk	2019–20	Ukrainian Premier League	23	0	1	0	12 (Note: Six appearances in UEFA Champions League, six appearances in UEFA Europa League)	0	1	0	37	0
Shakhtar Donetsk	2020–21	Ukrainian Premier League	4	0	1	0	1	0	1	0	7	0
Shakhtar Donetsk	2021–22	Ukrainian Premier League	6	0	1	0	4	0	1	0	12	0
Shakhtar Donetsk	2022–23	Ukrainian Premier League	2	0	0	0	0	0	0	0	2	0
Shakhtar Donetsk	Total		301	0	39	0	131	0	11	0	482	0
Career total			412	0	42	0	131	0	11	0	596	0

=== International ===
Appearances and goals by national team and year
National team	Year	Apps	Goals
Ukraine	2007	4	0
Ukraine	2008	5	0
Ukraine	2009	8	0
Ukraine	2010	5	0
Ukraine	2011	2	0
Ukraine	2012	10	0
Ukraine	2013	12	0
Ukraine	2014	7	0
Ukraine	2015	8	0
Ukraine	2016	10	0
Ukraine	2017	8	0
Ukraine	2018	6	0
Ukraine	2019	8	0
Ukraine	2020	3	0
Ukraine	2021	5	0
Ukraine	2022	1	0
Total		102	0

== Ambassador ==
Andriy Pyatov was the first brand ambassador of Ukrainian bank sportbank.

== Honours ==
Shakhtar Donetsk

- Vyshcha Liha/Ukrainian Premier League: 2007–08, 2009–10, 2010–11, 2011–12, 2012–13, 2013–14, 2016–17, 2017–18, 2018–19, 2019–20, 2022–23
- Ukrainian Cup: 2007–08, 2010–11, 2011–12, 2012–13, 2015–16, 2016–17, 2017–18, 2018–19
- Ukrainian Super Cup: 2008, 2010, 2012, 2013, 2014, 2015, 2017, 2021
- UEFA Cup: 2008–09

Ukraine U21

- UEFA European Under-21 Championship runner-up: 2006

Individual

- Ukrainian Premier League Best Goalkeeper: 2009–10, 2013–14, 2015–16, 2016–17, 2017–18, 2018–19, 2019–20,
- Ukrainian Premier League Footballer of the Year: 2010
- Top 10 Athletes of Ukraine: 2010, 2019

== See also ==
- List of men's footballers with 100 or more international caps
