= EUROFANZ =

Annual football tournament in Lviv, Ukraine

EUROFANZ (before 2016 Eurofan, Ukrainian: Єврофан) is an annual international football tournament which began in 2007 for fans of European teams and is held in Lviv, Ukraine.

== History ==
EUROFANZ is primarily organized by an NGO created by fans of FC Karpaty Lviv. The tournament, known as Eurofan (Ukrainian: Єврофан) prior to 2016, has been held every summer since 2007. Four teams from two countries participated in the first year. Participation grew to 24 teams in 2013, 2015 and 2017. Eurofanz 2018 will be held on 12–15 July. Eurofanz's official motto is "Football, Fun, Friendz – enjoy EUROFANZ!"

== Mission and organisation ==
EUROFANZ's mission is to help develop friendship, respect, and a spirit of sportsmanship among European football fans. A charity project—From European fans to Lviv children—is part of the festival; fans are encouraged to bring humanitarian aid and sports equipment for local orphanages.

The festival's programme usually includes opening press conference, the football tournament itself, Lviv city tours and a celebration party after the tournament.

== Past events ==
=== 2007 ===
Three Ukrainian and one Russian football team's supporters participated in the first tournament: Karpaty Lviv, Dynamo Kyiv, Shakhtar Donetsk and Zenit Saint Petersburg. Dynamo Kyiv was the winner of Eurofan 2007.

=== 2008 ===
Six teams competed in the second tournament: Karpaty Lviv, Dnipro Dnipropetrovsk, Dynamo Kyiv, Wales national football team, Wisła Kraków and Zenit Saint Petersburg. Dnipro Dnipropetrovsk won the tournament.

=== 2009 ===
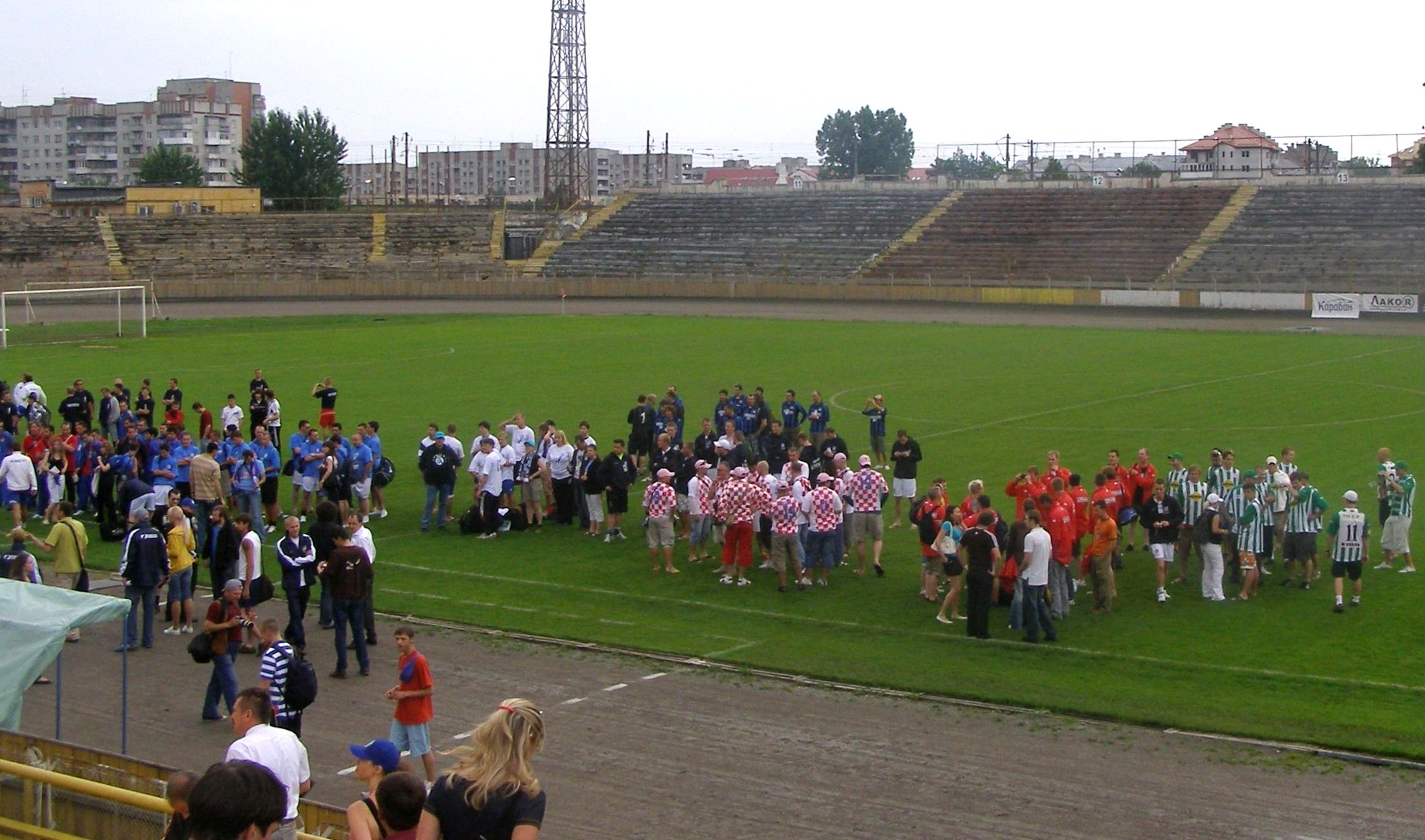
Eurofan 2009 opening

Teams from multiple European countries participated in Eurofanz 2009:

- Croatia national football team
- Wales national football team
- (Spain) Atlético Madrid
- (Czech Republic) Bohemians 1905
- (Italy) A.C. ChievoVerona
- (Scotland) Rangers
- (Netherlands) SC Heerenveen
- (Italy) F.C. Internazionale Milano
- (Ukraine) FC Karpaty Lviv
- (England) Liverpool F.C.
- (Ukraine) FC Maestro (amateur team of the Ukrainian musicians)
- (Poland) TS Ostrovia Ostrów Wielkopolski
- (Austria) SK Rapid Wien
- (Germany) FC Schalke 04
- (Russia) Zenit Saint Petersburg

Scottish supporters of the Rangers team became the winners beating FC Karpaty Lviv 4–1.

=== 2010 ===
The fourth Eurofanz was held on 8–11 July 2010. "АВМ СПОРТ" company, which represents football brand Umbro, was the technical sponsor of the tournament. Matches were played with footballs made by the well-known manufacturer SELECT. Eurofanz 2010 had 16 participants:

- Belgium national football team
- Czech Republic national football team
- Finland national football team
- (Georgia (country)) Georgia national football team
- Slovenia national football team
- Sweden men's national football team
- Ukraine national football team
- Wales national football team
- (Spain) Atlético Madrid
- (Germany) Hamburger SV
- (Netherlands) SC Heerenveen
- (Italy) F.C. Internazionale Milano
- (Ukraine) FC Karpaty Lviv
- (England) Liverpool F.C.
- (France) Paris Saint-Germain F.C.
- (Russia) Zenit Saint Petersburg

Scottish supporters of the Rangers team became the winners beating FC Karpaty Lviv 4–1.

=== 2011 ===
Eurofanz 2011 was called Silpo Eurofanz 2011 for sponsorship reasons. It had a record number of participants. The attending club supporters included:

- (England) Liverpool F.C.
- (Italy) Chievo Verona
- (Russia) Zenit Saint Petersburg
- (Russia) Lokomotiv Moscow
- (Denmark) F.C. Copenhagen
- (Poland) Śląsk Wrocław
- (Poland) Lechia Gdańsk
- (Belarus) Dinamo Minsk
- (Bulgaria) Botev Plovdiv
- (Romania) Dinamo București
- (Ukraine) Karpaty Lviv

National team supporters:

- Croatia national football team
- Czech Republic national football team
- (Republic of Ireland) Ireland national football team
- Moldova national football team
- Poland national football team
- Slovenia national football team
- Serbia national football team
- Slovakia national football team
- Ukraine national football team
- Sweden men's national football team
- Wales national football team

and also Team of Lviv city councillors called "Levy" (Lions).

Supporters of the Slovenia national team became the winners beating Zenit Saint Petersburg 6–5 on penalties (match had ended 1-1).

=== 2012 ===
Eurofanz 2012 was called the Silpo Eurofanz 2012 for sponsorship reasons and was held from June 28 to July 1. For the first time in tournament history only supporters' national teams were represented, plus Karpaty Lviv and FC Maestro (members of show business):

Group A
- Croatia national football team
- Moldova national football team
- Slovenia national football team

Group B

- Czech Republic national football team
- Wales national football team
- Slovakia national football team

Group C

- Poland national football team
- (Georgia (country)) Georgia national football team
- Denmark national football team

Group D

- Northern Ireland national football team
- Sweden men's national football team
- (Ukraine) FC Maestro

Group E

- Russia national football team
- Estonia national football team
- Belarus national football team

Group F

- (Ukraine) FC Karpaty Lviv
- Italy national football team
- Lithuania national football team

Group G

- Ukraine national football team
- Serbia national football team
- Romania national football team

Supporters of the Romania national team have won the final match, beating FC Maestro 4–3 on penalties (match had ended 0-0).

After the final match, all the participants watched the EURO 2012 final at the Lviv fan zone.

=== 2013 ===
Eurofanz 2013 was sponsored by the brand Nivea For Men. 24 teams participated, breaking the previous record of 23:

Group A
- (Russia) Lokomotiv Moscow
- (Czech Republic) 1. FC Slovácko
- (Slovakia) Spartak Myjava
- Croatia national team

Group B

- (Georgia (country)) Dinamo Tbilisi
- (Moldova) Zimbru Chișinău
- (Ukraine) Karpaty Lviv
- Slovakia national team

Group C

- (Germany) Hamburger SV
- (Russia) Zenit St. Petersburg
- Italy national team

Group D

- (Romania) Dinamo București
- Belarus national team
- Republic of Ireland national team
- Sweden national team

Group E

- (Denmark) F.C. Copenhagen
- Bulgaria national team
- Northern Ireland national team

Group F

- Netherlands national team
- Ukraine national team
- Wales national team

Group G

- (Belarus) Dinamo Minsk
- Poland national team
- Slovenia national team

The festival activities included various parties and a poker tournament.

In the final game, the Bulgarian team overcame Dinamo București 6–5 on penalties after full-time ended 1-1.

=== 2014 ===
22 teams were engaged in the Eurofanz 2014 fan festival:

Group A
- (Sweden) IFK Norrköping
- (Czech Republic) 1. FC Slovácko
- (Slovakia) Spartak Myjava
- Ukraine national team

Group B

- (Denmark) F.C. Copenhagen
- (Ukraine) Karpaty Lviv
- Slovakia national team
- (Ukraine) Karpaty Lviv veterans*

Group C

- Belarus national team
- (Georgia (country)) Georgia national team
- Moldova national team
- Slovenia national team

Group D

- (Romania) Dinamo București
- (Ukraine) Batyary (amateur rugby team consisting of Karpaty fans)*
- Sweden national team
- Northern Ireland national team

Group E

- Bulgaria national team
- (Georgia (country)) Dinamo Tbilisi
- (Netherlands) SC Heerenveen

Group F

- Finland national team
- (Belarus) Dinamo Minsk
- Republic of Ireland national team

* Out of competition.

Final: Bulgaria team – Ukraine team – 0:0 (5–4 on penalties).

=== 2015 ===
Eurofanz 2015 brought together 24 teams from 15 countries:

Group A
- Belarus national team
- Estonia national team
- Sweden national team
- Ukraine national team

Group B

- (Romania) Dinamo București
- (Georgia (country)) Georgia national team
- Latvia national team
- (Slovakia) Spartak Myjava

Group C

- (Denmark) F.C. Copenhagen
- (Slovakia) Dukla Banská Bystrica
- Republic of Ireland national team
- Moldova national team

Group D

- Bulgaria national team
- (England) Leyton Orient
- (Ukraine) Journalists team
- Slovenia national team

Group E

- Finland national team
- (Estonia) Flora
- (Ukraine) Karpaty Lviv
- (Moldova) Zimbru Chișinău

Group F

- (Belarus) Dinamo Minsk
- (Georgia (country)) Dinamo Tbilisi
- (Netherlands) SC Heerenveen
- (Czech Republic) 1. FC Slovácko

Final: Bulgaria team – Dinamo Minsk – 1:0.

=== 2016 ===
In the year 2016, the tournament celebrated its jubilee, so the organizers rebranded its name and official emblem. From now on the tournament was called EUROFANZ.

21 teams participated in the jubilee fan-tournament:

Group A
- Ukraine national team
- Republic of Ireland national team
- (Slovakia) Spartak Myjava
- (Georgia (country)) Dinamo Tbilisi

Group B

- Slovenia national team
- (Netherlands) Feyenoord
- Latvia national team
- (Romania) Dinamo București

Group C

- Belarus national team
- Sweden national team
- (Netherlands) SC Heerenveen
- (Czech Republic) 1. FC Slovácko

Group D

- (Denmark) F.C. Copenhagen
- (Georgia (country)) Georgia national team
- (Sweden) AIK
- Finland national team

Group E

- (Belarus) Dinamo Minsk
- (Ukraine) Karpaty Lviv
- (Moldova) Zimbru Chișinău
- (Slovakia) Dukla Banská Bystrica
- (Czech Republic) Zbrojovka Brno

Final: Ukraine team – Dinamo Minsk – 6:2.

=== 2017 ===
The EUROFANZ 2017 fan-festival was from 29 June to 2 July 2017 (the tournament lasted from 30 June till 2 July).

24 teams participated in the tournament:

Group A
- (England) Newcastle United
- (Estonia) Flora
- (Sweden) AIK
- (Czech Republic) 1. FC Slovácko

Group B

- (Czech Republic) Zbrojovka Brno
- (Ukraine) Karpaty Lviv
- Republic of Ireland national team
- Sweden national team

Group C

- Belarus national team
- (Netherlands) Feyenoord
- France national team
- (Slovakia) Spartak Myjava

Group D

- Slovenia national team
- (Netherlands) SC Heerenveen
- Latvia national team
- (Georgia (country)) Georgia national football team

Group E

- (Romania) Dinamo București
- (Belarus) Dinamo Minsk
- (Moldova) Zimbru Chișinău
- (Finland) Helsinki team

Group F

- Finland national team
- (Denmark) F.C. Copenhagen
- Ukraine national team
- (Slovakia) Dukla Banská Bystrica

Final: Slovenia team – Belarus team – 2:1.

=== 2018 ===
The EUROFANZ 2018 fan-festival was held from 13 July to 15 July (the final match was scheduled on the day of 2018 FIFA World Cup final)

21 teams participated in the tournament:

Group A
- (Netherlands) Feyenoord
- France national team
- (Ukraine) Karpaty Lviv legends (out of competition)

Group B

- (Moldova) Zimbru Chișinău
- (Slovakia) Dukla Banská Bystrica
- Romania national team

Group C

- (Republic of Ireland) Ireland national team
- (England) Newcastle United
- (Czech Republic) Zbrojovka Brno

Group D

- (Wales) Bala Town
- (Sweden) AIK
- (Netherlands) Heerenveen

Group E

- (Ukraine) Karpaty Lviv
- Sweden national team
- Latvia national team

Group F

- Bulgaria national team
- (Finland) Helsinki team
- (Belarus) Dinamo Minsk

Group G

- Belarus national team
- (Czech Republic) 1. FC Slovácko
- Ukraine national team

Final: Romania team – France team – 2:0.

=== 2019 ===
The dates for EUROFANZ 2019 are June 28–30, 2019. France is the winner of this edition.
