= Ihor Kulchytskyi =

Soviet football player

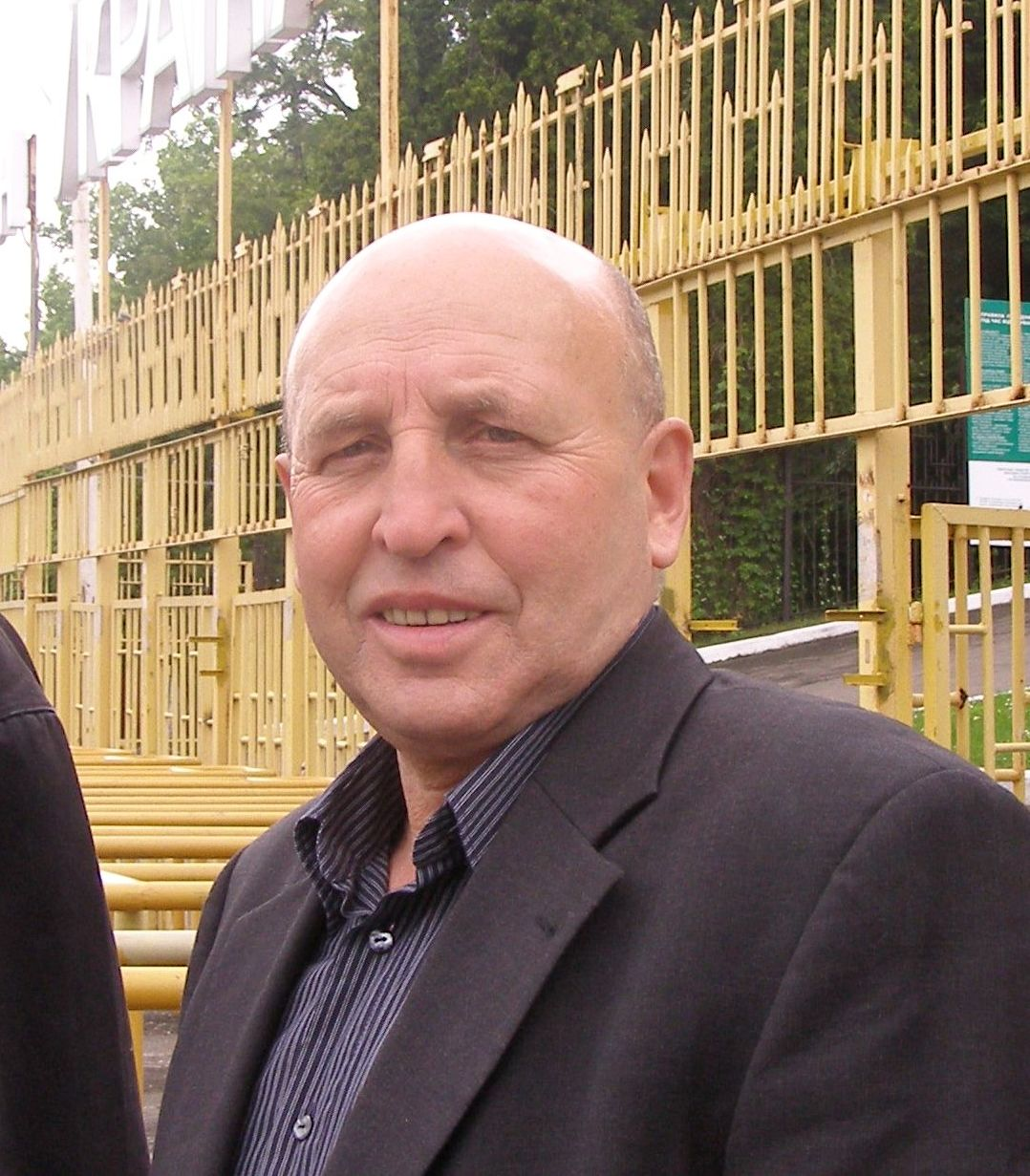
- 2009

Personal information
- Full name: Ihor Yevstakhiyovych Kulchytskyi
- Date of birth: 13 August 1941 (age 85)
- Place of birth: Lemberg, District of Galicia, General Government
- Position: Midfielder

Youth career
- 1957–: DYuSSh-4 Lviv

Senior career*
Years	Team	Apps	(Gls)
1961	Naftovyk Drohobych		
1961	Dynamo Kyiv		
1962	Silmash Lviv		
1963–1972	Karpaty Lviv	307	(37)

International career
1971	USSR	2	(0)

Managerial career
- 1973–1977: FC Karpaty Lviv (assistant)
- 1980–1987: FC Karpaty Lviv (academy)
- 1987–1988: DYuSSh-4 Lviv
- 1989: FC Karpaty Lviv (nachalnik)
- * Club domestic league appearances and goals

Ihor Yevstakhiyovych Kulchytskyi (Ukrainian: Ігор Євстахійович Кульчицький, Russian: Игорь Евстафьевич Кульчицкий; born 13 August 1941) is a retired Soviet football player, Master of Sports of the USSR.

== Biography ==
Kulchytsky was born during World War II in occupied by the Nazi Germany Western Ukraine. After the war he finished the Lviv Institute of Physical Culture and the school of Journalism of Lviv University.

From 1961 to 1973 Kulchytsky was a non-amateur football player, playing mostly in the All-Soviet competitions, while spending some years in other clubs from the western Ukraine. In 1969 being a captain of Karpaty Lviv, he led the team to victory in the Soviet Cup competition where in final at Luzhniki Stadium of Vladimir Lenin they beat Rostov Army team.

Upon retiring Kulchytsky studied at the Higher school of coaches in Moscow. In 1987–88 he was a children coach of his former sports school (Sports school 4). In 1989 Kulchytsky became a team administrator of Karpaty Lviv. Later he worked for cities authorities until 2001. Since then Kulchytsky represents Karpaty at the Football Federation of Lviv Oblast.

== Honours ==
- Soviet Cup winner: 1969.

== International career ==
Kulchytsky made his debut for USSR on 17 February 1971 in a friendly against Mexico.
