= Yuriy Shevchuk (footballer) =

Ukrainian footballer and manager

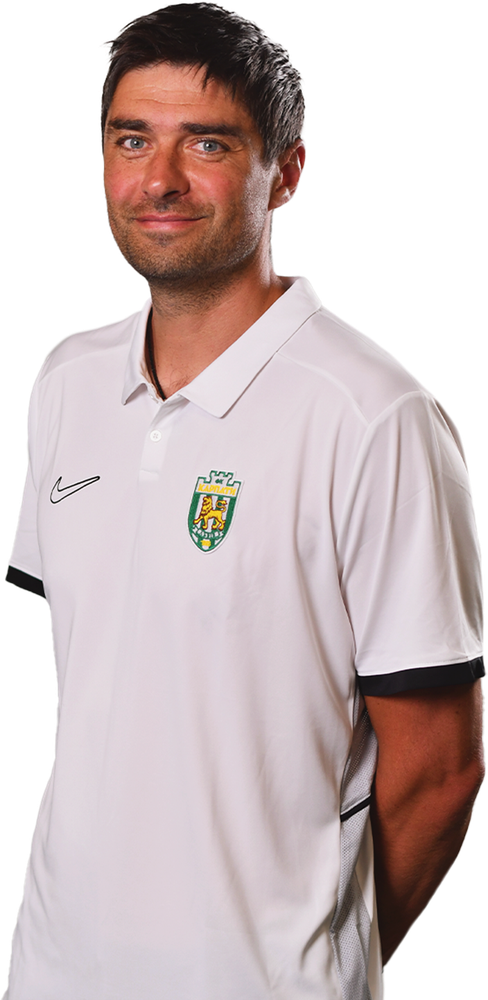

Personal information
- Full name: Yuriy Stepanovych Shevchuk
- Date of birth: 6 May 1985 (age 41)
- Place of birth: Novohrad-Volynskyi, Ukrainian SSR
- Height: 1.98 m (6 ft 6 in)
- Position: Goalkeeper

Youth career
- 1999: Polissya Zhytomyr
- 2000–2002: UFK Karpaty Lviv

Senior career*
Years	Team	Apps	(Gls)
2002–2006	Karpaty Lviv	0	(0)
2002	→ Karpaty-3 Lviv	2	(0)
2003–2004	→ Halychyna-Karpaty Lviv	5	(0)
2004–2006	→ Karpaty-2 Lviv	25	(0)
2006	Nyva Ternopil	12	(0)
2007	Odeva Lipany	?	(?)
2008	Bodva Moldava nad Bodvou	?	(?)
2008–2010	Lviv	8	(0)
2010	→ Lviv-2	4	(0)
2011	Sambir	12	(0)
2012–2020	Rukh Vynnyky	113	(0)

Managerial career
- 2017–: Rukh Vynnyky (goalkeeping coach)
- * Club domestic league appearances and goals as of 27 September 2017

Yuriy Stepanovych Shevchuk (Ukrainian: Юрій Степанович Шевчук; born 6 May 1985) is a Ukrainian football goalkeeping coach and retired footballer who played as a goalkeeper.

== Career ==
Shevchuk is a product of youth team systems of FC Polissya and UFK Karpaty. His first trainers were Ruslan Skydan and Valeriy Bliznichenko.

He spent his career mainly as a player in the lower leagues of Ukraine and Slovakia. But also played two games for FC Lviv in the Ukrainian Premier League in 2008.
