= Sportyvna Hazeta =

Sportyvna Hazeta (Спортивна газета, СГ)
- Type: Daily newspaper
- Format: Broadsheet
- Owner(s): Committee in Physical Culture and Sports of the Council of Ministers of the UkrSSR and Ukrainian Republican Council of Trade Unions
- Editor-in-chief: Dmytro Aleksandrenko
- Founded: 1 June 1934
- Ceased publication: 2008
- Language: Ukrainian (primary), Russian (some period)
- Headquarters: 13 vulytsia Kostyolna; Kyiv, Ukraine

Sportyvna hazeta (Ukrainian: Спортивна газета, СГ) was Ukraine's influential sports newspaper and official sports newspaper of the Soviet government of Ukraine published several (3) days per week in Kyiv in 1934–1992. Following dissolution of the Soviet Union, the newspaper lost its government support and slowly phased out.

It appeared in 1931 in Kharkiv as a Russian language newspaper Gotov k trudu i oboronye, yet its official date of establishment is considered as 1 June 1934 soon after capital of Ukraine was moved to Kyiv from Kharkiv. Since the relocation the newspaper changed to Ukrainian language and changed to Hotovyi do pratsi ta(i) oborony. In 1938, it switched its name again to Radyanskyi sport.

During the World War II in 1940–1949 it was not published.

In October 1949, it was revived as Radyanskyi sport. In April 1965, the newspaper changed its name again to Sportyvna hazeta. At the time of dissolution of the Soviet Union, it had some 600,000 subscribers. After 1992 Sportyvna hazeta lost its government support and had difficulties with financing, which led to its partial closure starting in late 1999.

In mid 2000s, the newspaper was taken under aegis of the National Olympic Committee of Ukraine, but soon was discontinued completely.
