= 2020–21 FC Vorskla Poltava season =

Vorskla Poltava
2020–21 season
- Chairman: Roman Cherniak
- Manager: Yuriy Maksymov
- Stadium: Oleksiy Butovskyi Vorskla Stadium
- Ukrainian Premier League: 5th
- Ukrainian Cup: 2020–21 Ukrainian Cup
- Top goalscorer: League: Vladyslav Kulach (15); All: Vladyslav Kulach (17)
- Highest home attendance: 2,523 (vs FC Mariupol, 26 September 2020)
- Lowest home attendance: 0
- Average home league attendance: 346
Home colours	Away colours

The 2020–21 season was 25th consecutive season in the top Ukrainian football league for Vorskla Poltava. Vorskla competed in Premier League and Ukrainian Cup.

== Players ==
=== Squad information ===
As of 30 June 2021

Squad no.	Name	Nationality	Position	Date of birth (age)
Goalkeepers
21	Oleksandr Tkachenko	(Ukraine)	GK	19 February 1993 (aged 28)
31	Dmytro Riznyk ^{List B}	(Ukraine)	GK	30 January 1999 (aged 22)
51	Pavlo Isenko ^{List B}	(Ukraine)	GK	21 July 2003 (aged 17)
Defenders
5	Najeeb Yakubu ^{List B}	(Ghana)	DF	1 May 2000 (aged 21)
9	Bradley de Nooijer (on loan from Viitorul Constanța)	(Netherlands)	FW	7 November 1997 (aged 23)
13	Serhiy Yavorskyi	(Ukraine)	DF	5 July 1989 (aged 31)
17	Volodymyr Chesnakov (Captain)	(Ukraine)	DF	12 February 1988 (aged 33)
23	Vadym Sapay	(Ukraine)	DF	7 February 1986 (aged 35)
27	Illya Krupskyi ^{List B}	(Ukraine)	DF	2 October 2004 (aged 16)
36	Bohdan Chuyev ^{List B}	(Ukraine)	DF	23 February 2000 (aged 21)
37	Valeriy Dubko ^{List B}	(Ukraine)	DF	22 March 2001 (aged 20)
39	Yevhen Opanasenko	(Ukraine)	DF	25 August 1990 (aged 30)
43	Taras Dmytruk ^{List B}	(Ukraine)	DF	9 March 2000 (aged 21)
50	Ibrahim Kane ^{List B}	(Mali)	DF	23 June 2000 (aged 21)
Midfielders
4	Ihor Perduta	(Ukraine)	MF	15 November 1990 (aged 30)
6	Oleksandr Sklyar	(Ukraine)	MF	26 February 1991 (aged 30)
7	Luizão	(Brazil)	MF	20 February 1998 (aged 23)
8	Olivier Thill	(Luxembourg)	MF	17 December 1996 (aged 24)
15	Artem Kulakovskyi ^{List B}	(Ukraine)	MF	11 February 2000 (aged 21)
19	Heorhiy Tsitaishvili (on loan from Dynamo Kyiv) ^{List B}	(Ukraine)	FW	11 February 2000 (aged 21)
24	Radion Posyevkin ^{List B}	(Ukraine)	MF	18 May 2001 (aged 20)
28	David Puclin	(Croatia)	MF	17 June 1992 (aged 29)
30	Ivan Nesterenko ^{List B}	(Ukraine)	MF	23 July 2003 (aged 17)
38	Artem Chelyadin ^{List B}	(Ukraine)	MF	29 December 1999 (aged 21)
45	Daniil Khrypchuk ^{List B}	(Ukraine)	MF	9 December 2003 (aged 17)
47	Amilcar Codjovi ^{List B}	(England) (Spain)	MF	22 February 2002 (aged 19)
49	Danylo Buhayenko ^{List B}	(Ukraine)	MF	4 October 2002 (aged 18)
52	Daniil Syemilyet ^{List B}	(Ukraine)	MF	7 March 2001 (aged 20)
82	Pavlo Rebenok	(Ukraine)	MF	23 July 1985 (aged 35)
92	Pape-Alioune Ndiaye	(France)	MF	4 February 1998 (aged 23)
	Yan Kostenko ^{List B}	(Ukraine)	MF	4 July 2003 (aged 17)
Forwards
10	Vladyslav Kulach	(Ukraine)	FW	7 May 1993 (aged 28)
11	Ruslan Stepanyuk	(Ukraine)	FW	16 January 1992 (aged 29)
14	Danylo Kravchuk ^{List B}	(Ukraine)	FW	2 July 2001 (aged 19)
86	Oleksandr Kozhevnikov ^{List B}	(Ukraine)	FW	17 April 2000 (aged 21)
99	Dmytro Shcherbak	(Ukraine)	FW	8 December 1996 (aged 24)

== Transfers ==
=== In ===
Date	Pos.	Player	Age	Moving from	Type	Fee	Source
Summer
7 August 2020	MF	(Croatia) Ivan Pešić	28	(Kazakhstan) Kaisar Kyzylorda	Transfer	Undisclosed	
10 August 2020	DF	(Ukraine) Serhiy Yavorskyi	31	(Ukraine) FC Mariupol	Transfer	Free	
10 August 2020	MF	(Ukraine) Mykyta Tatarkov	25	(Ukraine) FC Lviv	Transfer	Undisclosed	
Winter
1 January 2021	MF	(Luxembourg) Olivier Thill	24	(Russia) FC Ufa	Transfer	Free	
6 January 2021	MF	(England) Amilcar Codjovi	18	Unattached	Transfer	Free	
8 January 2021	MF	(Brazil) Luizão	22	(Portugal) Porto	Transfer	Undisclosed	
2 March 2021	FW	(Ivory Coast) Saliia Cherif Konate	18		Transfer	Undisclosed	
31 December 2020	FW	(Ukraine) Yuriy Kozyrenko	21	(Ukraine) Hirnyk-Sport Horishni Plavni	Loan return		
1 January 2021	MF	(Ukraine) Heorhiy Tsitaishvili	20	(Ukraine) Dynamo Kyiv	Loan		
12 February 2021	DF	(Netherlands) Bradley de Nooijer	23	(Romania) Viitorul Constanța	Loan		

=== Out ===
Date	Pos.	Player	Age	Moving to	Type	Fee	Source
Summer
31 July 2020	DF	(Spain) Juanma García	23	Unattached	Transfer	Free	
31 July 2020	DF	(Ukraine) Denys Taraduda	20	Unattached	Transfer	Free	
31 July 2020	MF	(Ukraine) Artem Bilyi	20	Unattached	Transfer	Free	
28 August 2020	GK	(Ukraine) Danylo Kanevtsev	24	(Ukraine) Metal Kharkiv	Transfer	Undisclosed	
28 August 2020	DF	(Ukraine) Maksym Melnychuk	20	(Ukraine) Chornomorets Odesa	Transfer	Undisclosed	
29 August 2020	FW	(Ukraine) Volodymyr Odaryuk	26	(Ukraine) MFC Mykolaiv	Transfer	Undisclosed	
1 September 2020	MF	(Ukraine) Artem Habelok	25	(Armenia) Pyunik Yerevan	Transfer	Undisclosed	
19 September 2020	DF	(Ukraine) Yevhen Martynenko	27	(Ukraine) Chornomorets Odesa	Transfer	Undisclosed	
4 September 2020	FW	(Ukraine) Denys Halata	20	(Ukraine) Kremin Kremenchuk	Loan		
25 September 2020	FW	(Ukraine) Yuriy Kozyrenko	20	(Ukraine) Hirnyk-Sport Horishni Plavni	Loan		
Winter
26 January 2021	DF	(Ukraine) Volodymyr Bayenko	26	(Estonia) Levadia Tallinn	Transfer	Free	
29 January 2021	MF	(Ukraine) Mykyta Tatarkov	26	(Armenia) Pyunik Yerevan	Transfer	Free	
2 March 2021	DF	(Ukraine) Valeriy Dubko	19	Unattached	Transfer	Free	
10 March 2021	MF	(Ukraine) Illya Hadzhuk	18	(Ukraine) Dynamo Kyiv	Transfer	Free	
10 March 2021	MF	(Ukraine) Oleh Vlasov	18	(Ukraine) Dynamo Kyiv	Transfer	Free	
3 February 2021	MF	(Ukraine) Denys Vasin	31	(Ukraine) Inhulets Petrove	Loan		
7 February 2021	MF	(Croatia) Ivan Pešić	28	(Romania) FC Voluntari	Loan		
28 February 2021	FW	(Ukraine) Yuriy Kozyrenko	21	(Belarus) Isloch Minsk Raion	Loan		

== Pre-season and friendlies ==
29 August 2020 Friendly	FC Mynai (Ukraine)	4–2	(Ukraine) Vorskla Poltava	Mynai
17:00 EEST (UTC+03:00)	23'; Knysh 31'; Shynder 64', 67'	Report	Tatarkov 17'; 53' (o.g.)	Stadium: Mynai Arena

2 September 2020 Friendly	FC Mynai (Ukraine)	1–2	(Ukraine) Vorskla Poltava	Uzhhorod
17:00 EEST (UTC+03:00)	Shynder 13'	Report	Vasin 58'; Kulach 70'	Stadium: Avanhard Stadium

24 January 2021 Friendly	Vorskla Poltava (Ukraine)	1–2	(Kosovo) Ballkani Suva Reka	Turkey
15:30 EET (UTC+02:00)	Shcherbak 14'	Report	Daku 29'; Hoxha 62'

28 January 2021 Friendly	Vorskla Poltava (Ukraine)	2–2	(Serbia) Mladost Lučani	Turkey
15:00 EET (UTC+02:00)	Kravchuk 10'; Tsitaishvili 19'	Report	24'; 37'

31 January 2021 Friendly	Vorskla Poltava (Ukraine)	5–0	(Kosovo) Drita Gjilan	Turkey
14:30 EET (UTC+02:00)	Kulach 14' (pen.), 78'; Stepanyuk 55' (pen.); Kane 61'; Shcherbak 66'	Report

4 February 2021 Friendly	Vorskla Poltava (Ukraine)	2–1	(Montenegro) Zeta Golubovci	Turkey
16:00 EET (UTC+02:00)	Kane 29'; Shcherbak 83'	Report	4'

== Competitions ==
=== Overall ===
Competition	First match	Last match	Starting round	Final position	Record							
Competition	First match	Last match	Starting round	Final position	Pld	W	D	L	GF	GA	GD	Win %
Premier League	23 August 2020	9 May 2021	Matchday 1	5th	26	11	8	7	37	30	+7	42.31
Cup	30 September 2020	2 December 2020	Round of 32 (1/16)	Round of 16 (1/8)	2	1	0	1	2	1	+1	50.00
Total					28	12	8	8	39	31	+8	42.86

Last updated: 9 May 2021
Source: Competitions

=== Premier League ===
==== League table ====
Pos	Team	Pld	W	D	L	GF	GA	GD	Pts	Qualification or relegation
3	Zorya Luhansk	26	15	5	6	44	22	+22	50	Qualification for the Europa League play-off round
4	Kolos Kovalivka	26	10	11	5	36	26	+10	41	Qualification for the Europa Conference League third qualifying round
5	Vorskla Poltava	26	11	8	7	37	30	+7	41	Qualification for the Europa Conference League second qualifying round
6	Desna Chernihiv	26	10	8	8	38	32	+6	38	
7	SC Dnipro-1	26	8	6	12	36	38	−2	30	

Source: Ukrainian Premier League
Rules for classification: 1) Points; 2) Head-to-head points; 3) Head-to-head goal difference; 4) Head-to-head higher number of goals scored; 5) Goal difference; 6) Higher number of goals scored; 7) Draw or "Golden match" if two teams tied for title (Article 22, paragraph 3).

==== Results summary ====
Overall								Home						Away					
Pld	W	D	L	GF	GA	GD	Pts	W	D	L	GF	GA	GD	W	D	L	GF	GA	GD
26	11	8	7	37	30	+7	41	7	3	3	25	16	+9	4	5	4	12	14	−2

Last updated: 9 May 2021.
Source: Competitive matches

==== Results by round ====
Round	1	2	3	4	5	6	7	8	9	10	11	12	13	14	15	16	17	18	19	20	21	22	23	24	25	26
Ground	H	H	A	H	A	A	A	A	A	H	A	A	H	A	A	H	A	H	H	H	H	H	A	H	H	A
Result	W	W	W	D	D	W	D	L	D	W	L	L	D	D	D	W	W	L	W	L	W	W	L	L	D	W
Position	1	1	1	2	2	2	2	3	3	3	3	4	5	5	5	5	5	5	4	5	5	4	5	6	6	5

Updated to match(es) played on 9 May 2021. Source: Competitive matches
A = Away; H = Home; W = Win; D = Draw; L = Loss

==== Matches ====
23 August 2020 1	Vorskla Poltava	5–2	Rukh Lviv	Poltava
17:00 EEST (UTC+03:00)	Puclin 10'; Stepanyuk 26'; Kulach 43', 49', (yellow card) 88'; Sklyar 45'; Chesnakov (yellow card) 61'	Report	Duts (yellow card) 52'; Fedorchuk 63'; Rusyn (yellow card) 65'; Mysyk (yellow card) 84'; Boychuk 90+1'	Stadium: Vorskla Stadium; Attendance: 0 Referee: Oleksiy Derevinskyi
Note: Match was played behind closed doors due to quarantine in Ukraine during COVID-19 pandemic.

13 September 2020 2	Vorskla Poltava	2–0	Inhulets Petrove	Poltava
19:30 EEST (UTC+03:00)	Ndiaye (yellow card) 22'; Puclin (yellow card) 34'; Stepanyuk 36', (yellow card) 52'; Chesnakov (yellow card) 50'; Kane 67' (pen.)	Report	Kozak (yellow card) 35' (yellow-red card) 70'; Lupashko (yellow card) 39'; Synyohub (yellow card) 65'	Stadium: Vorskla Stadium; Attendance: 0 Referee: Yuriy Mozharovskyi
Note: Match was played behind closed doors due to quarantine in Ukraine during COVID-19 pandemic.

19 September 2020 3	FC Oleksandriya	0–2	Vorskla Poltava	Oleksandriya
14:00 EEST (UTC+03:00)	Myshenko (yellow card) 13'; Miroshnichenko (yellow card) 22'; Pashayev (yellow card) 56'; Banada (yellow card) 75'	Report	Puclin (yellow card) 16', (goal) 52'; Stepanyuk 25'; Kane (yellow card) 38'; Kulach (yellow card) 46'; Pešić (yellow card) 90'	Stadium: CSC Nika Stadium; Attendance: 1,800; Referee: Kateryna Monzul

26 September 2020 4	Vorskla Poltava	0–0	FC Mariupol	Poltava
17:00 EEST (UTC+03:00)	Sklyar (yellow card) 49'; Puclin (yellow card) 90+1'	Report	Bykov (yellow card) 16'; Halchuk (yellow card) 20'; Topalov (yellow card) 53'; Peterman (yellow card) 90+3' (yellow-red card) 90+5'	Stadium: Vorskla Stadium; Attendance: 2,523; Referee: Volodymyr Novokhatniy

3 October 2020 5	SC Dnipro-1	2–2	Vorskla Poltava	Dnipro
14:00 EEST (UTC+03:00)	Nazarenko 14', (yellow card) 89'; Kohut (yellow card) 25'; Ihnatenko (yellow card) 52'; Douglas (yellow card) 58'; Tsurikov (yellow card) 73' (yellow-red card) 74'; Buletsa 90+5'	Report	Kulach (yellow card) 16', (goal) 42'; Sklyar (yellow card) 33' (yellow-red card) 81'; Yakubu (yellow card) 60'; Kane 66', (yellow card) 89' (yellow-red card) 90+4'	Stadium: Dnipro-Arena; Attendance: 700; Referee: Yuriy Ivanov

18 October 2020 6	Olimpik Donetsk	0–1	Vorskla Poltava	Kyiv
14:00 EEST (UTC+03:00)	Do Couto (yellow card) 45'; Alvarenga (yellow card) 47'	Report	Yakubu (yellow card) 46' (yellow-red card) 90+2'; Kulach 70'; Riznyk (yellow card) 90+3'	Stadium: Dynamo Stadium; Attendance: 0 Referee: Volodymyr Novokhatniy
Note: Match was played behind closed doors due to quarantine in Ukraine during COVID-19 pandemic.

24 October 2020 7	Shakhtar Donetsk	1–1	Vorskla Poltava	Kyiv
14:00 EEST (UTC+03:00)	Solomon 33'; Maycon (yellow card) 39'	Report	Kulach 7'; Ndiaye (yellow card) 17' (yellow-red card) 53'; Rebenok (yellow card) 36'; Perduta (yellow card) 49'; Puclin (yellow card) 74'	Stadium: Bannikov Stadium; Attendance: 0 Referee: Vitaliy Romanov
Note: Match was played behind closed doors due to quarantine in Ukraine during COVID-19 pandemic.

1 November 2020 8	FC Lviv	1–0	Vorskla Poltava	Lviv
17:00 EEST (UTC+03:00)	Nych (yellow card) 6', (goal) 27'; Hrysyo (yellow card) 41'; Mahmutovic (yellow card) 59'; Rafael Sabino (yellow card) 89'; Mihoubi (yellow card) 90+6'	Report	Kulach (yellow card) 8'; Shcherbak (yellow card) 50'; Kane (yellow card) 90+3'	Stadium: Arena Lviv; Attendance: 0 Referee: Ihor Paskhal
Note: Match was played behind closed doors due to quarantine in Ukraine during COVID-19 pandemic.

8 November 2020 9	Zorya Luhansk	0–0	Vorskla Poltava	Zaporizhia
19:30 EET (UTC+02:00)	Yurchenko (yellow card) 15'; Kabayev (yellow card) 24'; Khomchenovskyi (red card) 60'	Report	Rebenok (yellow card) 47' (yellow-red card) 70'; Perduta (yellow card) 50'; Kravchuk (yellow card) 89'	Stadium: Slavutych-Arena; Attendance: 8 Referee: Yevhen Aranovskyi

22 November 2020 10	Vorskla Poltava	3–0	Kolos Kovalivka	Poltava
19:30 EET (UTC+02:00)	Sklyar 31', (yellow card) 78'; Puclin (yellow card) 52'; Chesnakov (yellow card) 55'; Shcherbak 58'; Yavorskyi 65'	Report	Havrysh (yellow card) 14'; Novak (yellow card) 19'; Lysenko (yellow card) 38'; Petrov (yellow card) 64'; Zozulya (yellow card) 76'	Stadium: Vorskla Stadium; Attendance: 0 Referee: Dmytro Kryvushkin
Note: Match was played behind closed doors due to quarantine in Ukraine during COVID-19 pandemic.

28 November 2020 11	Dynamo Kyiv	2–0	Vorskla Poltava	Kyiv
17:00 EET (UTC+02:00)	Tsyhankov 13'; Verbič 36'; Zabarnyi (red card) 82'	Report	Perduta (yellow card) 3'; Chelyadin (yellow card) 72'; Sklyar (yellow card) 76'; Yavorskyi (yellow card) 87'; Kane (red card) 90'	Stadium: NSC Olimpiyskiy; Attendance: 0 Referee: Yuriy Ivanov
Note: Match was played behind closed doors due to quarantine in Ukraine during COVID-19 pandemic.

6 December 2020 12	Desna Chernihiv	1–0	Vorskla Poltava	Chernihiv
17:00 EET (UTC+02:00)	Yermakov (yellow card) 30'; Kalitvintsev (yellow card) 74'; Dehtyarov 90+4'	Report	Stepanyuk (yellow card) 19' (yellow-red card) 84'; Yavorskyi (yellow card) 80'	Stadium: Chernihiv Stadium; Attendance: 0 Referee: Kateryna Monzul
Note: Match was played behind closed doors due to quarantine in Ukraine during COVID-19 pandemic.

12 December 2020 13	Vorskla Poltava	1–1	FC Mynai	Poltava
14:00 EET (UTC+02:00)	Puclin (yellow card) 38'; Yavorskyi (yellow card) 52'; Sklyar (yellow card) 61'; Kravchuk 63'	Report	Nuriyev 14'; Tkachuk (yellow card) 65'; Holodyuk (yellow card) 81'; Malepe (yellow card) 85'; Matić (yellow card) 90+1'	Stadium: Vorskla Stadium; Attendance: 0 Referee: Denys Shurman
Note: Match was played behind closed doors due to quarantine in Ukraine during COVID-19 pandemic.

14 February 2021 14	Rukh Lviv	1–1	Vorskla Poltava	Lviv
17:00 EET (UTC+02:00)	Klymchuk 17' (pen.); Zec (yellow card) 32'; Bilyi (yellow card) 56'	Report	Tsitaishvili 52'; Ndiaye (yellow card) 62'	Stadium: Arena Lviv; Attendance: 0 Referee: Yuriy Ivanov
Note: Match was played behind closed doors due to quarantine in Ukraine during COVID-19 pandemic.

21 February 2021 15	Inhulets Petrove	2–2	Vorskla Poltava	Poltava
14:00 EET (UTC+02:00)	Sichinava (yellow card) 17', (goal) 62'; Bartulović 22' (pen.); Kucherenko (yellow card) 38'; Malysh (yellow card) 90+4'; Balan (yellow card) 90+5'	Report	Stepanyuk 49'; Chelyadin (yellow card) 59'; Yavorskyi (yellow card) 63'; Kulach 76' (pen.); Puclin (yellow card) 90'	Stadium: Vorskla Stadium; Attendance: 0 Referee: Dmytro Bondarenko
Note: Match was played behind closed doors due to quarantine in Ukraine during COVID-19 pandemic.

27 February 2021 16	Vorskla Poltava	3–1	FC Oleksandriya	Poltava
17:00 EET (UTC+02:00)	Kulach 39', 77' (pen.); Thill 70' de Nooijer (yellow card) 89'	Report	Hrechyshkin (yellow card) 2'; Vantukh (yellow card) 52'; Babohlo 55'; Shastal (yellow card) 57'; Banada (yellow card) 76'; Sitalo (yellow card) 79'	Stadium: Vorskla Stadium; Attendance: 1,050; Referee: Dmytro Shurman

6 March 2021 17	FC Mariupol	0–1	Vorskla Poltava	Poltava
14:00 EET (UTC+02:00)	Bykov (red card) 34'; Tankovskyi (yellow card) 56' (yellow-red card) 78'; Kulakov (yellow card) 90'	Report	Kane (yellow card) 21'; Kulach 35' (pen.); Sklyar (yellow card) 39'	Stadium: Vorskla Stadium; Attendance: 1,488; Referee: Denys Shurman

13 March 2021 18	Vorskla Poltava	0–1	SC Dnipro-1	Poltava
17:00 EET (UTC+02:00)	Sklyar (yellow card) 4'; Thill (yellow card) 45+1'; Chelyadin (yellow card) 77'	Report	Douglas (yellow card) 17' (yellow-red card) 53'; Kohut (yellow card) 34'; Dovbyk 40'	Stadium: Vorskla Stadium; Attendance: 925; Referee: Viktor Kopiyevksyi

20 March 2021 19	Vorskla Poltava	3–0	Olimpik Donetsk	Poltava
19:30 EET (UTC+02:00)	Stepanyuk 13', 55'; Snurnitsyn 25' (o.g.); Kulach (yellow card) 77'	Report	Zotko (yellow card) 44'	Stadium: Vorskla Stadium; Attendance: 0 Referee: Yaroslav Kozyk
Note: Match was played behind closed doors due to quarantine in Ukraine during COVID-19 pandemic.

4 April 2021 20	Vorskla Poltava	0–2	Shakhtar Donetsk	Poltava
17:00 EEST (UTC+03:00)	Puclin (yellow card) 31'	Report	Moraes 42', 62'; Marlos (yellow card) 45+1'; Maycon (yellow card) 88'	Stadium: Vorskla Stadium; Attendance: 0 Referee: Serhiy Boyko
Note: Match was played behind closed doors due to quarantine in Ukraine during COVID-19 pandemic.

11 April 2021 21	Vorskla Poltava	2–1	FC Lviv	Poltava
14:00 EEST (UTC+03:00)	Yakubu (yellow card) 14'; Kane (yellow card) 32', (goal) 47'; Kulach 50'; Sklyar (yellow card) 90'	Report	Mahmutovic (yellow card) 8'; Čirjak (yellow card) 27'; Hrysyo (yellow card) 28'; Dovhyi 73'	Stadium: Vorskla Stadium; Attendance: 0 Referee: Mykola Balaknin
Note: Match was played behind closed doors due to quarantine in Ukraine during COVID-19 pandemic.

17 April 2021 22	Vorskla Poltava	4–2	Zorya Luhansk	Poltava
17:00 EEST (UTC+03:00)	Stepanyuk 8'; Kulach 24', 33', 49'; Yakubu (yellow card) 48'	Report	Cvek (yellow card) 9'; Zahedi (yellow card) 34'; Vernydub (yellow card) 40'; Khomchenovskyi (yellow card) 62'; Hladkyy 79'; Leovigildo (yellow card) 83'; Favorov 90+3'	Stadium: Vorskla Stadium; Attendance: 0 Referee: Yevhen Aranovskyi
Note: Match was played behind closed doors due to quarantine in Ukraine during COVID-19 pandemic.

24 April 2021 23	Kolos Kovalivka	3–0	Vorskla Poltava	Kovalivka
17:00 EEST (UTC+03:00)	Kostyshyn (yellow card) 24', (goal) 47'; Churko 66'; Smyrnyi 87'	Report	Sklyar (yellow card) 37'; Yavorskyi (yellow card) 65'; Ndiaye (yellow card) 84'	Stadium: Kolos Stadium; Attendance: 0 Referee: Ihor Paskhal
Note: Match was played behind closed doors due to quarantine in Ukraine during COVID-19 pandemic.

1 May 2021 24	Vorskla Poltava	1–5	Dynamo Kyiv	Poltava
19:30 EEST (UTC+03:00)	Kulach 24' (pen.); Sapay (yellow card) 55'; Stepanyuk (yellow card) 62'; Thill (yellow card) 71'; Kravchuk (yellow card) 87'	Report	Buyalskyi 6', 15', 32'; Kędziora (yellow card) 26'; Rodrigues 65'; Sidcley 84'	Stadium: Vorskla Stadium; Attendance: 0 Referee: Viktor Kopiyevskyi
Note: Match was played behind closed doors due to quarantine in Ukraine during COVID-19 pandemic.

5 May 2021 25	Vorskla Poltava	1–1	Desna Chernihiv	Poltava
19:00 EEST (UTC+03:00)	Thill 18'; Yakubu (yellow card) 62' (yellow-red card) 86'; Sapay (yellow card) 90'	Report	Konoplya (yellow card) 39'; Hitchenko 54'; Tamm (yellow card) 69'; Hutsulyak (yellow card) 90+3'	Stadium: Vorskla Stadium; Attendance: 0 Referee: Kateryna Monzul
Note: Match was played behind closed doors due to quarantine in Ukraine during COVID-19 pandemic.

9 May 2021 26	FC Mynai	1–2	Vorskla Poltava	Uzhhorod
14:00 EEST (UTC+03:00)	Khakhlyov 7' (pen.), (yellow card) 36'; Malepe (yellow card) 12'; Bagayoko (yellow card) 19'; Matić (yellow card) 40'; Akhmedzade (yellow card) 60'; Milevskyi (yellow card) 90+1'	Report	Kane 14'; Kulach 41' (pen.); Chesnakov (yellow card) 70'; Sklyar (yellow card) 74'	Stadium: Avanhard Stadium; Attendance: 1,000; Referee: Vitaliy Romanov

=== Ukrainian Cup ===
30 September 2020 Round of 32 (1/16)	Vorskla Poltava	2–0	FC Lviv	Poltava
17:00 EET (UTC+02:00)	Sklyar (yellow card) 77'; Kulach 78', 82'	Report		Stadium: Vorskla Stadium; Attendance: 546; Referee: Maksym Kozyryatskyi

2 December 2020 Round of 16 (1/8)	Ahrobiznes Volochysk	1–0	Vorskla Poltava	Poltava
14:00 EET (UTC+02:00)	Yukhymovych (yellow card) 20'; Chernenko 25', (yellow card) 35'; Mykola Kohut (yellow card) 43'; Semenyuk (yellow card) 75'; Mozil (yellow card) 90+2'	Report	Stepanyuk (yellow card) 77'	Stadium: Vorskla Stadium; Attendance: 0 Referee: Volodymyr Novokhatniy

== Statistics ==
=== Appearances and goals ===
No.	Pos	Nat	Player	Total		Premier League		Cup	
No.	Pos	Nat	Player	Apps	Goals	Apps	Goals	Apps	Goals
Goalkeepers
21	GK	(Ukraine) UKR	Oleksandr Tkachenko	3	0	2	0	1	0
31	GK	(Ukraine) UKR	Dmytro Riznyk	25	0	24	0	1	0
Defenders
5	DF	(Ghana) GHA	Najeeb Yakubu	21	0	17+2	0	1+1	0
9	DF	(Netherlands) NED	Bradley de Nooijer	3	0	0+3	0	0	0
13	DF	(Ukraine) UKR	Serhiy Yavorskyi	25	1	24	1	1	0
17	DF	(Ukraine) UKR	Volodymyr Chesnakov	24	0	23	0	1	0
23	DF	(Ukraine) UKR	Vadym Sapay	15	0	7+6	0	2	0
27	DF	(Ukraine) UKR	Illya Krupskyi	1	0	0+1	0	0	0
37	DF	(Ukraine) UKR	Valeriy Dubko	2	0	0+2	0	0	0
39	DF	(Ukraine) UKR	Yevhen Opanasenko	4	0	0+3	0	1	0
50	DF	(Mali) MLI	Ibrahim Kane	24	4	22+1	4	0+1	0
Midfielders
4	MF	(Ukraine) UKR	Ihor Perduta	24	0	22	0	1+1	0
6	MF	(Ukraine) UKR	Oleksandr Sklyar	24	2	20+2	2	1+1	0
7	MF	(Brazil) BRA	Luizão	10	0	4+6	0	0	0
8	MF	(Luxembourg) LUX	Olivier Thill	13	2	13	2	0	0
19	MF	(Ukraine) UKR	Heorhiy Tsitaishvili	4	1	3+1	1	0	0
28	MF	(Croatia) CRO	David Puclin	25	2	24	2	1	0
30	MF	(Ukraine) UKR	Ivan Nesterenko	1	0	0+1	0	0	0
38	MF	(Ukraine) UKR	Artem Chelyadin	21	0	3+16	0	1+1	0
45	MF	(Ukraine) UKR	Daniil Khrypchuk	1	0	0+1	0	0	0
52	MF	(Ukraine) UKR	Daniil Syemilyet	2	0	1+1	0	0	0
82	MF	(Ukraine) UKR	Pavlo Rebenok	15	0	6+8	0	1	0
92	MF	(France) FRA	Pape-Alioune Ndiaye	23	0	19+2	0	2	0
Forwards
10	FW	(Ukraine) UKR	Vladyslav Kulach	22	17	21	15	0+1	2
11	FW	(Ukraine) UKR	Ruslan Stepanyuk	25	7	24	7	1	0
14	FW	(Ukraine) UKR	Danylo Kravchuk	18	1	5+12	1	0+1	0
86	FW	(Ukraine) UKR	Oleksandr Kozhevnikov	1	0	0+1	0	0	0
99	FW	(Ukraine) UKR	Dmytro Shcherbak	15	1	5+8	1	1+1	0
Players transferred out during the season
7	MF	(Ukraine) UKR	Mykyta Tatarkov	2	0	0+1	0	1	0
9	FW	(Croatia) CRO	Ivan Pešić	10	0	0+8	0	2	0
25	MF	(Ukraine) UKR	Oleh Vlasov	1	0	0+1	0	0	0
42	MF	(Ukraine) UKR	Illya Hadzhuk	1	0	0+1	0	0	0
77	FW	(Ukraine) UKR	Denys Vasin	5	0	0+4	0	1	0

Source: Competitions

Last updated: 9 May 2021

=== Goalscorers ===
Rank	No.	Pos	Nat	Name	Premier League	Cup	Total
1	10	FW	(Ukraine)	Vladyslav Kulach	15	2	17
2	11	FW	(Ukraine)	Ruslan Stepanyuk	7	0	7
3	50	DF	(Mali)	Ibrahim Kane	4	0	4
4	6	MF	(Ukraine)	Oleksandr Sklyar	2	0	2
4	8	MF	(Luxembourg)	Olivier Thill	2	0	2
4	28	MF	(Croatia)	David Puclin	2	0	2
7	13	DF	(Ukraine)	Serhiy Yavorskyi	1	0	1
7	14	FW	(Ukraine)	Danylo Kravchuk	1	0	1
7	19	MF	(Ukraine)	Heorhiy Tsitaishvili	1	0	1
7	99	FW	(Ukraine)	Dmytro Shcherbak	1	0	1
				Own goal	1	0	1
				Total	37	2	39

Last updated: 9 May 2021

=== Clean sheets ===
Rank	No.	Pos	Nat	Name	Premier League	Cup	Total
1	31	GK	(Ukraine)	Dmytro Riznyk	7	0	7
2	21	GK	(Ukraine)	Oleksandr Tkachenko	1	1	2
				Total	8	1	9

Last updated: 9 May 2021

=== Disciplinary record ===
No.	Pos	Nat	Player	Premier League			Cup			Total		
No.	Pos	Nat	Player	Booked	(yellow card) (yellow-red card)	Sent off (straight red)	Booked	(yellow card) (yellow-red card)	Sent off (straight red)	Booked	(yellow card) (yellow-red card)	Sent off (straight red)
4	MF	(Ukraine)	Ihor Perduta	3	0	0	0	0	0	3	0	0
5	DF	(Ghana)	Najeeb Yakubu	3	2	0	0	0	0	3	2	0
6	MF	(Ukraine)	Oleksandr Sklyar	9	1	0	1	0	0	10	1	0
8	MF	(Luxembourg)	Olivier Thill	2	0	0	0	0	0	2	0	0
9	DF	(Netherlands)	Bradley de Nooijer	1	0	0	0	0	0	1	0	0
9	FW	(Croatia)	Ivan Pešić	1	0	0	0	0	0	1	0	0
10	FW	(Ukraine)	Vladyslav Kulach	5	0	0	0	0	0	5	0	0
11	FW	(Ukraine)	Ruslan Stepanyuk	2	1	0	1	0	0	3	1	0
13	DF	(Ukraine)	Serhiy Yavorskyi	5	0	0	0	0	0	5	0	0
14	FW	(Ukraine)	Danylo Kravchuk	2	0	0	0	0	0	2	0	0
17	DF	(Ukraine)	Volodymyr Chesnakov	4	0	0	0	0	0	4	0	0
23	DF	(Ukraine)	Vadym Sapay	2	0	0	0	0	0	2	0	0
28	MF	(Croatia)	David Puclin	8	0	0	0	0	0	8	0	0
31	GK	(Ukraine)	Dmytro Riznyk	1	0	0	0	0	0	1	0	0
38	MF	(Ukraine)	Artem Chelyadin	3	0	0	0	0	0	3	0	0
50	DF	(Mali)	Ibrahim Kane	4	1	1	0	0	0	4	1	1
82	MF	(Ukraine)	Pavlo Rebenok	1	1	0	0	0	0	1	1	0
92	MF	(France)	Pape-Alioune Ndiaye	3	1	0	0	0	0	3	1	0
99	FW	(Ukraine)	Dmytro Shcherbak	1	0	0	0	0	0	1	0	0
			Total	60	7	1	2	0	0	62	7	1

Last updated: 9 May 2021

=== Attendances ===
	Matches	Attendances	Average	High	Low
Premier League	13	4,498	346	2,523	0
Cup	1	546	546	546	546
Total	14	5,044	360	2,523	0

Last updated: 9 May 2021
