= 2024 Ukrainian Cup final =

Association football match

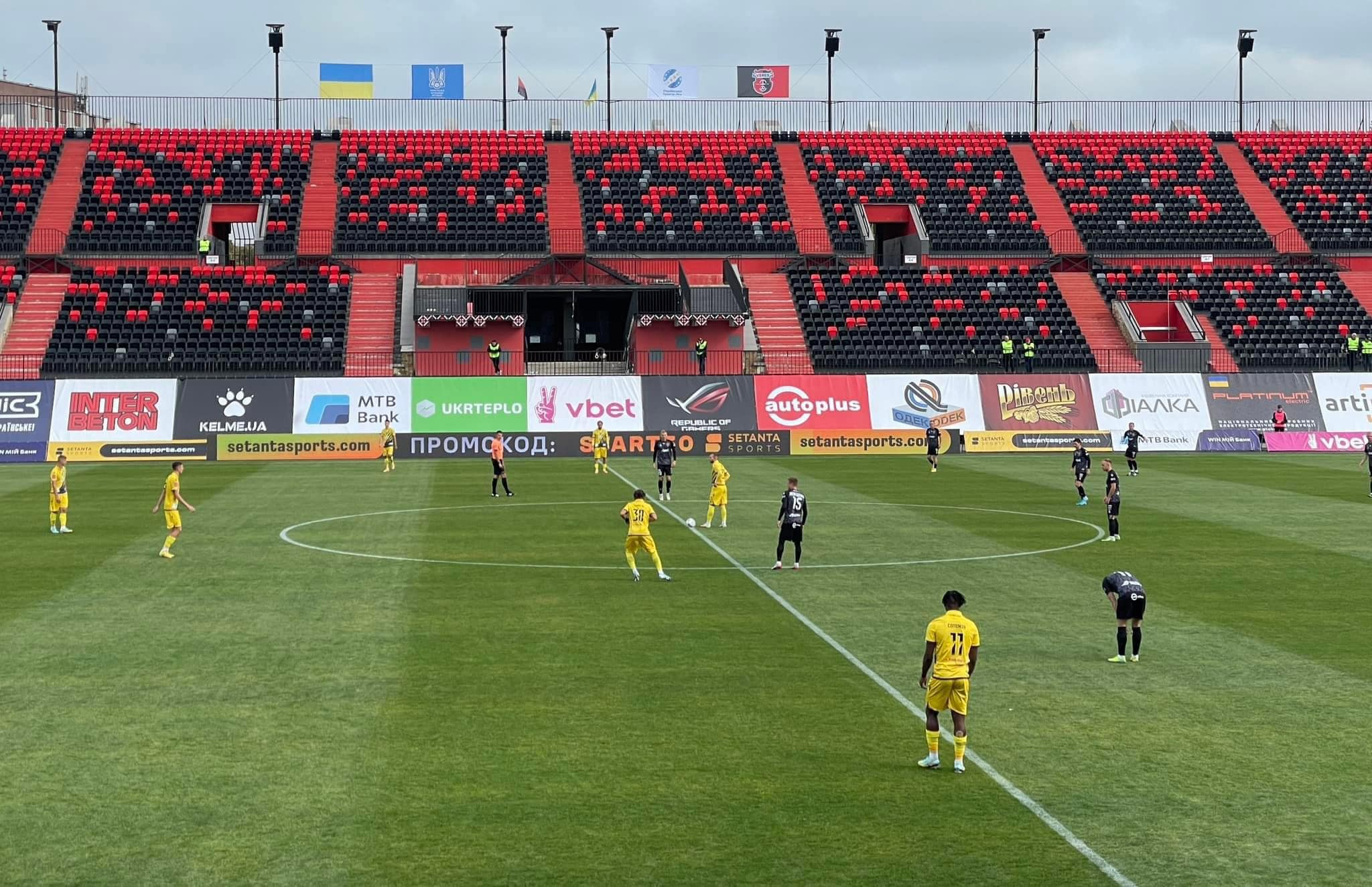
- The final match venue
- Event: 2023–24 Ukrainian Cup
Vorskla Poltava	Shakhtar Donetsk
1	2
- Date: 15 May 2024
- Venue: Avanhard Stadium, Rivne
- Referee: Vitaliy Romanov (Dnipro)
- Attendance: 3,500

The 2024 Ukrainian Cup final was the 31st final match of the annual Ukrainian football cup competition. It was played on 15 May 2024 at the Avanhard Stadium in Rivne. This is the first time the cup final would be held in Rivne.

With still ongoing full-scale invasion of Ukraine by the Russian Federation, this final was the first one since the start of the invasion in February 2022 and the 9th since the start of the war in 2014.

== Road to the final ==
Note: In all results below, the score of the finalist is given first (H: home; A: away).

Vorskla Poltava		Round	Shakhtar Donetsk
Opponent	Result	2023–24 Ukrainian Cup	Opponent	Result
Metalist 1925 Kharkiv	3–0 (N)	Round of 16	Veres Rivne	3–0 (A)
Obolon Kyiv	3–0 (A)	Quarter-finals	Viktoriya Sumy	3–0 (N)
Polissia Zhytomyr	1–0 (A)	Semi-finals	Chornomorets Odesa	4–1 (N)

=== Vorskla Poltava ===
As a Premier League team, Vorskla Poltava started in the Round of 16, notionally away at Ukrainian Premier League side Metalist 1925 Kharkiv. At the Livyi Bereh Arena near Kyiv, Vorskla Poltava won 3–0 with a series of goals from Ibrahim Kane, Ruslan Stepanyuk, and Ivan Nesterenko. In the quarter-finals, they were drawn away at Ukrainian Premier League team Obolon Kyiv and won 3–0 at the Obolon Arena in Kyiv due to goals from Stepanyuk, Kane, and Andriy Batsula. In the semi-finals at away Zhytomyr Tsentralnyi Stadion, they played fellow Ukrainian Premier League Polissia Zhytomyr and reached their third final with a 1–0 win with a Serhiy Myakushko goal.

=== Shakhtar Donetsk ===
As a Premier League team, Shakhtar Donetsk started in the Round of 16, they were drawn away to Veres Rivne and won 3–0 at the Avanhard Stadium in Rivne thanks to goals from Kashchuk, Bondarenko and Ocheretko. In the Quarter-finals, they were drawn against Viktoriya Sumy and won 3–0 at the Livyi Bereh in Hnidyn with goals from Nazaryna, Zubkov and Rakitskyi. In the Semi-Finals, they were drawn to Chornomorets Odesa and won 4–1 at Arena Lviv thanks to goals from Sikan, Bondarenko (penalty) and a brace from Sudakov.

== Previous encounters ==
Both clubs have existed since Soviet times, but they have never played each other in official games (domestic league, national cup), with Shakhtar playing in the top tier and Vorskla (formerly Kolos) in the third tier of the All-Union football competitions.

Following the dissolution of the Soviet Union, these teams faced each other more frequently. While Vorskla is recognized as an obvious underdog, it is considered not an easy opponent for the miners. Within the Ukrainian Cup, both teams met 9 times, with 6 matches played at the quarterfinal stage. Vorskla was victorious twice, while Shakhtar has 5 wins. However, this is their second final, and in the last final between them, which took place in 2009, Vorskla gained its only national trophy thus far.

This was also the second final for the Vorskla manager Serhiy Dolhanskyi, who, in 2009, as a captain and goalkeeper of Vorskla, won the cup already in the role of a player in the Vorskla–Shakhtar final.

=== Teams at the competition's finals ===
Team	Previous finals appearances (bold indicates winners)
Vorskla Poltava	2 (**2009**, 2020)
Shakhtar Donetsk	19 (**1995**, **1997**, **2001**, **2002**, 2003, **2004**, 2005, 2007, **2008**, 2009, **2011**, **2012**, **2013**, 2014, 2015, **2016**, **2017**, **2018**, **2019**)

== Match ==
15 May 2024
19:00

Vorskla Poltava (PL)	1–2	(PL) Shakhtar Donetsk
Kovtalyuk 85'	Report (ua); Report (en)	Sikan 40'; Konoplya 55'

Avanhard, Rivne
Attendance: 3,500
Referee: Vitaliy Romanov (Dnipro)

«Vorskla» Poltava	«Shakhtar» Donetsk

«Vorskla»:
GK	7	(Ukraine) Pavlo Isenko
DF	27	(Ukraine) Illya Krupskyi
DF	18	(Ukraine) Yevhen Pavlyuk
DF	44	(Ukraine) Danylo Khrypchuk	(yellow card) 90+1'
DF	4	(Ukraine) Ihor Perduta (c)
MF	5	(Nigeria) Najeeb Yakubu	(substituted off) 58'
MF	6	(Ukraine) Oleksandr Sklyar	(substituted off) 68'
MF	33	(Ukraine) Serhiy Myakushko	(substituted off) 58'
MF	15	(Mali) Ibrahim Kane
MF	11	(Ukraine) Ruslan Stepanyuk	(substituted off) 68'
FW	92	(France) Sambou Sissoko	(substituted off) 85'
Substitutions:
DF	95	(Brazil) Felipe Rodrigues	(substituted on) 85'
MF	38	(Ukraine) Artem Chelyadin	(substituted on) 68'
MF	30	(Ukraine) Ivan Nesterenko	(substituted on) 58'
FW	22	(Ukraine) Mykola Kovtalyuk	(substituted on) 68'
DF	29	(Ukraine) Andriy Batsula	(substituted on) 58' (yellow card) 87'
Head coach:
(Ukraine) Serhiy Dolhanskyi

«Shakhtar»:
GK	31	(Ukraine) Dmytro Riznyk	(yellow card) 90+3'
DF	16	(Georgia (country)) Irakli Azarovi
DF	22	(Ukraine) Mykola Matviyenko
DF	5	(Ukraine) Valeriy Bondar
DF	26	(Ukraine) Yukhym Konoplya
MF	6	(Ukraine) Taras Stepanenko (c)	(substituted off) 74'
MF	8	(Ukraine) Dmytro Kryskiv	(yellow card) 90+1'
MF	27	(Brazil) Kevin
MF	21	(Ukraine) Artem Bondarenko
FW	11	(Ukraine) Oleksandr Zubkov	(substituted off) 81'
FW	14	(Ukraine) Danylo Sikan	(substituted off) 81'
Substitutions:
GK	1	(Ukraine) Artur Rudko
DF	23	(Brazil) Pedrinho
MF	13	(Georgia (country)) Giorgi Gocholeishvili
MF	44	(Ukraine) Yaroslav Rakitskyi
DF	29	(Ukraine) Yehor Nazaryna
MF	9	(Ukraine) Maryan Shved	(substituted on) 81'
MF	39	(Brazil) Newerton
MF	2	(Burkina Faso) Lassina Traoré	(substituted on) 81' (yellow card) 90+1'
MF	30	(Brazil) Marlon Gomes	(substituted on) 74'
Head coach:
(Bosnia and Herzegovina) Marino Pusic

Match officials

- Referee assistants:
  - Semen Shlonchak (Cherkasy)
  - Volodymyr Vysotskyi (Zaporizhia)
- Fourth referee: Andriy Shandor (Lviv)
- Additional referee assistant: Maryna Striletska (Sumy)
- Refereeing supervisor: Viktor Derdo (Chornomorsk).
- VAR referee — Oleksiy Derevinskyi (Khmelnytskyi)
- VAR assistant — Ruslan Yermolenko (Chernihiv)
- VAR supervisor — Mykhailo Ovchar (Kalush).
- UAF delegate — Vasyl Babiy (Zhytomyr).

Regulation highlightes

- 90 minutes.
- 30 minutes of extra time if needed.
- Penalty kicks if needed.
- Nine players for substitution.
- Maximum 5 substitution per match (+1 in case of extra time).

== See also ==
- 2023–24 Ukrainian Premier League
