= 2020 Ukrainian Cup final =

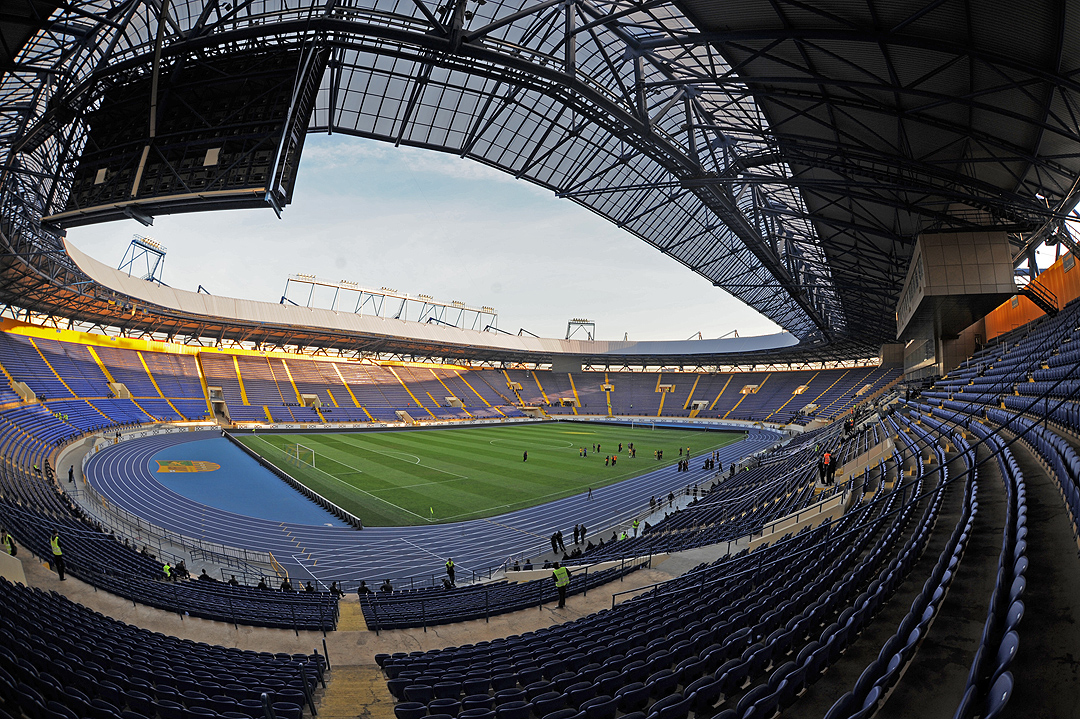
- Event: 2019–20 Ukrainian Cup
Dynamo Kyiv	Vorskla Poltava
1	1
- After extra time Dynamo Kyiv won 8–7 on penalties
- Date: 8 July 2020
- Venue: OSC Metalist, Kharkiv
- Referee: Kateryna Monzul
- Attendance: 0 (Note: The final was played behind closed doors due to the COVID-19 pandemic in Ukraine.)

The 2020 Ukrainian Cup final decided the winner of the 2019–20 Ukrainian Cup, the 29th season of the annual Ukrainian football cup competition. It was played on 8 July 2020 at the OSC Metalist Stadium in Kharkiv between Dynamo Kyiv and Vorskla Poltava. This was the fifth time the cup final would be held in Kharkiv after 2008, 2010, 2013 and 2017 finals.

Originally planned to be held on 13 May 2020 at Ternopilsky Misky Stadion in Ternopil, the final was later postponed to 8 July due to COVID-19 pandemic in Ukraine and first moved to Arena Lviv in Lviv, and then, considering the better epidemiological situation, to Kharkiv. Ternopil was granted the right to host the 2021 edition of the final instead. The match was played behind closed doors.

The winner Dynamo initially qualified to participate in the group stage of 2020–21 UEFA Europa League, however, it later qualified for 2020–21 UEFA Champions League after finishing as the league runners-up. The winner Dynamo Kyiv also qualified for the 2020 Ukrainian Super Cup, where it faced the champions of 2019–20 Ukrainian Premier League Shakhtar Donetsk.

== Road to the final ==
Both teams started their campaign in the Round of 16.

Note: In all results below, the score of the finalist is given first (H: home; A: away).

Dynamo Kyiv		Round	Vorskla Poltava
Opponent	Result	2019–20 Ukrainian Cup	Opponent	Result
Shakhtar Donetsk	2–1 (H) (a.e.t.)	Round of 16	Kolos Kovalivka	1–0 (A)
Oleksandriya	1–0 (H) (a.e.t.)	Quarter-finals	Desna Chernihiv	1–0 (A)
Mynai	2–0 (A)	Semi-finals	Mariupol	1–1 (A) (a.e.t.), (3–2 p)

== Previous encounters ==
In overall, games among which started back in 1996, Dynamo Kyiv and Vorskla Poltava have previously met 53 times, from which 40 were won by Dynamo, 9 were drawn and 4 won by Vorskla. In the matches on the highest level the only previous meeting of the clubs was in the 2009 Ukrainian Super Cup, which was won by Dynamo in the penalty shoot-out 4–2 after 0–0 draw after the regular and extra time. It is going to be third meeting of the clubs in competitions of Ukrainian Cup where two previous played as part of the 2002–03 Ukrainian Cup was won by Dynamo (1–0, 4–0).

For Dynamo Kyiv, this final was the 17th overall, with 11 wins in the previous 16 final appearances. Vorskla played in their second Ukrainian Cup Final after 2009, when they defeated Shakhtar Donetsk 1–0 and won their only Ukrainian Cup to the date.

== Match ==
8 July 2020
21:30

Dynamo Kyiv	1–1 (a.e.t.)	Vorskla Poltava
Verbič 28'	Report	Stepanyuk 11'
Penalties
Verbič (penalty scored); Tsyhankov (penalty scored); Kędziora (penalty scored) de Pena (penalty scored); Andriyevskyi (penalty scored); Sydorchuk (penalty scored); Shaparenko (penalty scored); Mykolenko (penalty missed); Shabanov (penalty scored)	8–7	(penalty scored) Puclin; (penalty scored) Kane; (penalty scored) Luizão; (penalty scored) Opanasenko; (penalty scored) Ndiaye; (penalty scored) Chesnakov; (penalty scored) Perduta; (penalty missed) Sapay; (penalty missed) Bayenko

OSC Metalist, Kharkiv
Attendance: 0
Referee: Kateryna Monzul (Kharkiv)

Dynamo Kyiv	Vorskla Poltava

Dynamo Kyiv:
GK	1	(Ukraine) Heorhiy Bushchan
DF	30	(Ukraine) Artem Shabanov	(yellow card) 80'
DF	34	(Ukraine) Oleksandr Syrota	(yellow card) 9'
DF	94	(Poland) Tomasz Kędziora
MF	5	(Ukraine) Serhiy Sydorchuk (c)
MF	7	(Slovenia) Benjamin Verbič	(yellow card) 113'
MF	8	(Ukraine) Volodymyr Shepelyev		(substituted off) 117'
MF	14	(Uruguay) Carlos de Pena
MF	16	(Ukraine) Vitalii Mykolenko
MF	29	(Ukraine) Vitaliy Buyalskyi	(yellow card) 89'	(substituted off) 99'
FW	11	(Ukraine) Heorhiy Tsitaishvili		(substituted off) 60'
Substitutes:
GK	71	(Ukraine) Denys Boyko
MF	6	(Ghana) Abdul Mohammed Kadiri
MF	15	(Ukraine) Viktor Tsyhankov		(substituted on) 60'
MF	18	(Ukraine) Oleksandr Andriyevskyi		(substituted on) 117'
MF	70	(Ukraine) Nazariy Rusyn
MF	99	(Denmark) Mikkel Duelund
FW	9	(Spain) Fran Sol
FW	10	(Ukraine) Mykola Shaparenko		(substituted on) 99'
FW	20	(Ukraine) Oleksandr Karavayev
Coach:
(Ukraine) Oleksiy Mykhaylychenko

Vorskla Poltava:
GK	31	(Ukraine) Dmytro Riznyk
DF	5	(Ghana) Najeeb Yakubu		(substituted off) 73'
DF	17	(Ukraine) Volodymyr Chesnakov (c)
DF	23	(Ukraine) Vadym Sapay
DF	50	(Mali) Ibrahim Kane
MF	4	(Ukraine) Ihor Perduta	(yellow card) 105+1'
MF	6	(Ukraine) Oleksandr Sklyar	(yellow card) 41'	(substituted off) 95'
MF	28	(Croatia) David Puclin
MF	92	(France) Pape-Alioune Ndiaye
FW	10	(Ukraine) Vladyslav Kulach		(substituted off) 76'
FW	11	(Ukraine) Ruslan Stepanyuk		(substituted off) 115'
Substitutes:
GK	21	(Ukraine) Oleksandr Tkachenko
GK	51	(Ukraine) Pavlo Isenko
DF	27	(Ukraine) Volodymyr Bayenko		(substituted on) 115'
MF	7	(Brazil) Luizão		(substituted on) 76'
MF	39	(Ukraine) Yevhen Opanasenko		(substituted on) 73'
MF	82	(Ukraine) Pavlo Rebenok
FW	9	(Bosnia and Herzegovina) Edin Šehić		(substituted on) 95'
FW	14	(Ukraine) Danylo Kravchuk
FW	77	(Ukraine) Denys Vasin
Coach:
(Ukraine) Yuriy Maksymov

MAN OF THE MATCH

MATCH OFFICIALS

- Assistant referees:
  - Maryna Striletska (Sumy)
  - Oleksandra Ardasheva (Kyiv)
- Fourth official:
  - Anastasiya Romaniuk (Ivano-Frankivsk)
- Reserved assistant referee:
  - S.Hrushko (Kyiv Oblast)
- Supervisor of refereeing:
  - S.Zadiran (Dnipro)
- Video assistant referee (VAR):
  - V.Romanov (Dnipro)
- VAR assistant:
  - V.Volodin (Kherson)
- VAR supervisor:
  - V.Petrov (Kharkiv)
- UAF game delegate
  - V.Foshchiy (Cherkasy)
- UAF security officer
  - S.Bortnyk (Kharkiv).

MATCH RULES

- 90 minutes.
- 30 minutes of extra-time if necessary.
- Penalty shoot-out if scores still level.
- Nine named substitutes.
- Maximum of 5 substitutions.

- Note: position and roster number is per the Ukrainian Premier League (and Footboom)

== See also ==
- 2019–20 Ukrainian Premier League
