= 2023–24 FC Vorskla Poltava season =

FC Vorskla Poltava
2023–24 season
- Head coach: Viktor Skrypnyk
- Stadium: Butovsky Vorskla Stadium
- Ukrainian Premier League: 9th
- Ukrainian Cup: Runners-up
- All statistics correct as of 25 November 2023.

The 2023–24 season is FC Vorskla Poltava's 59th season in existence and 26th consecutive in the Ukrainian Premier League. They are also competing in the Ukrainian Cup.

== Players ==
=== First-team squad ===
As of 10 December 2023

Note: Flags indicate national team as defined under FIFA eligibility rules; some limited exceptions apply. Players may hold more than one non-FIFA nationality.

No.	Pos.	Nation	Player
4	DF	UKR	Ihor Perduta (vice-captain)
5	DF	BRA	Lucas Ramires
6	MF	UKR	Oleksandr Sklyar
7	GK	UKR	Pavlo Isenko
9	DF	UKR	Viktor Korniyenko (on loan from Shakhtar Donetsk)
10	MF	UKR	Vladlen Yurchenko
11	FW	UKR	Ruslan Stepanyuk
17	MF	UKR	Volodymyr Chesnakov (captain)
18	DF	UKR	Yevhen Pavlyuk
20	FW	BRA	Thiago Cunha (on loan from Guarani de Palhoça)
25	DF	NIG	Najeeb Yakubu
27	DF	UKR	Illya Krupskyi
29	DF	UKR	Andriy Batsula
30	MF	UKR	Ivan Nesterenko

No.	Pos.	Nation	Player
35	DF	UKR	Danylo Izotov
38	MF	UKR	Artem Chelyadin
39	FW	UKR	Yaroslav Ryazantsev
40	MF	UKR	Dmytro Chernysh
43	FW	UKR	Vladyslav Ostrovskyi (on loan from Vorskla Poltava)
44	MF	UKR	Daniil Khrypchuk
50	DF	MLI	Ibrahim Kane
57	FW	UKR	Taras Halas
58	MF	UKR	Mykyta Odentsov
61	GK	UKR	Oleksandr Domoleha
74	DF	BRA	Tiago Santana (on loan from Metropolitano)
77	DF	ALB	Ardit Toli
95	DF	BRA	Felipe Rodrigues
96	GK	UKR	Daniil Yermolov

=== Other players under contract ===
Note: Flags indicate national team as defined under FIFA eligibility rules; some limited exceptions apply. Players may hold more than one non-FIFA nationality.

No.	Pos.	Nation	Player
—	FW	ENG	Rodel Richards

=== Out on loan ===
Note: Flags indicate national team as defined under FIFA eligibility rules; some limited exceptions apply. Players may hold more than one non-FIFA nationality.

No.	Pos.	Nation	Player
—	MF	UKR	Artem Kulakovskyi (at Oleksandriya until 30 June 2024)
—	MF	MKD	Ennur Totre (at (North Macedonia) Shkëndija until 30 June 2024)
—	MF	UKR	Danylo Tuzenko (at Hirnyk-Sport Horishni Plavni until 30 June 2024)

No.	Pos.	Nation	Player
—	MF	UKR	Artem Umanets (at Lokomotyv Kyiv until 30 June 2024)
—	FW	ALB	Taulant Seferi (at (United Arab Emirates) Baniyas until 30 June 2024)

== Pre-season and friendlies ==
Win Draw Loss Fixtures

14 January 2024 Friendly	Vorskla Poltava (Ukraine)	3–0	(Azerbaijan) Sabah	Serik, Turkey
				Stadium: Club Megasaray Football Center

18 January 2024 Friendly	Vorskla Poltava (Ukraine)	4–1	(Kazakhstan) Kaisar	Turkey

22 January 2024 Friendly	Vorskla Poltava (Ukraine)	0–2	(Kosovo) Llapi

30 January 2024 Friendly	Vorskla Poltava (Ukraine)	–	(Uzbekistan) Nasaf

== Competitions ==
Competition	First match	Last match	Starting round	Record							
Competition	First match	Last match	Starting round	Pld	W	D	L	GF	GA	GD	Win %
Ukrainian Premier League	6 August 2023	25 May 2024	Matchday 1	17	6	5	6	18	25	−7	35.29
Ukrainian Cup	27 September 2023		Round of 16	2	2	0	0	6	0	+6	100.00
Total				19	8	5	6	24	25	−1	42.11

Last updated: 10 December 2023
Source: Soccerway

=== Ukrainian Premier League ===
==== League table ====
Pos	Team	Pld	W	D	L	GF	GA	GD	Pts
7	LNZ Cherkasy	30	11	8	11	31	34	−3	41
8	Oleksandriya	30	8	10	12	30	38	−8	34
9	Vorskla Poltava	30	9	6	15	30	46	−16	33
10	Zorya Luhansk	30	7	11	12	29	37	−8	32 (Note: Zorya Luhansk finished ahead of Kolos Kovalivka and Chornomorets Odesa on head-to-head points: Zorya Luhansk 7, Kolos Kovalivka 6, Chornomorets Odesa 4)
11	Kolos Kovalivka	30	7	11	12	22	31	−9	32

Source: upl.ua
Rules for classification: 1) Points; 2) Head-to-head points; 3) Head-to-head goal difference; 4) Head-to-head goals scored; 5) Goal difference; 6) Goals scored; 7) Draw or "Golden match" if two teams tied for title (Article 22, paragraph 3).

==== Results summary ====
Overall								Home						Away					
Pld	W	D	L	GF	GA	GD	Pts	W	D	L	GF	GA	GD	W	D	L	GF	GA	GD
17	6	5	6	18	25	−7	23	2	3	4	10	16	−6	4	2	2	8	9	−1

Last updated: 10 December 2023.

==== Results by round ====
Round	1	2	3	4	5	6	7	8	9	10	11	12	13	14	15	16	17
Ground	H	A	H	A	H	H	A	H	A	A	H	H	A	A	H	A	H
Result	L	L	L	W	W	W	L	L	W	D	L	D	D	W	D	W	D
Position																	

Updated to match(es) played on 10 December 2023. Source:
A = Away; H = Home; W = Win; D = Draw; L = Loss; P = Postponed

==== Matches ====
1	v

=== Ukrainian Cup ===
27 September 2023 Round of 16	Metalist 1925 Kharkiv	0–3	Vorskla Poltava	Kyiv
18:30				Stadium: Stadion Livyi Bereh; Referee: Denys Reznikov

2 November 2023 Quarter-finals	Obolon Kyiv	0–3	Vorskla Poltava	Kyiv
17:00				Stadium: Obolon Arena; Referee: Denys Shurman
