= 2009 Ukrainian Super Cup =

Dynamo Kyiv	Vorskla Poltava
0	0
- Dynamo Kyiv won 4–2 on penalties
- Date: 11 July 2009
- Venue: Yuvileiny Stadium, Sumy
- Referee: Yevhen Herenda (Kalush)
- Attendance: 18,500

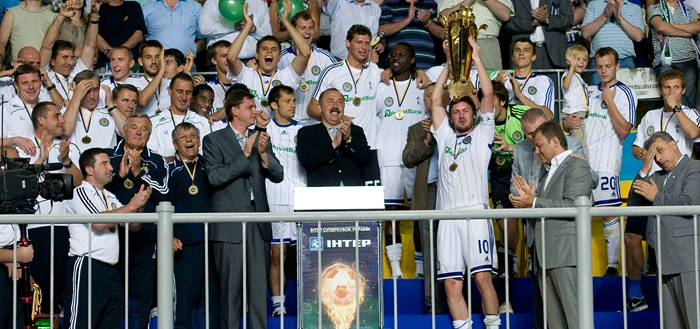
Milevskyi holding the trophy

The 2009 Ukrainian Super Cup became the sixth edition of Ukrainian Super Cup, which is an annual football exhibition game contested by the winners of the previous season's Ukrainian Top League and Ukrainian Cup competitions.

The match was played on 11 July 2009 in Sumy at Yuvileiny Stadium which recently lost its main tenant FC Spartak Sumy that dissolved earlier. Dynamo were protesting to play in Sumy. On 17 June 2009 it was picked as a nominal host. On 30 June 2009 the television channel "Inter" made a press-release announcing that it signed a contract with the Ukrainian Premier League about exclusive rights on broadcasting of the event.

This year the Super Cup was contested by league winner Dynamo Kyiv and cup winner Vorskla Poltava. Dynamo won it 4–2 on penalties.

== Match ==
=== Details ===
11 July 2009

Dynamo Kyiv	0–0	Vorskla Poltava
	Report
Penalties
Ninković (penalty scored); Kravchenko (penalty scored); Yarmolenko (penalty scored); Eremenko (penalty scored)	4–2	Curri (penalty scored); Markoski (penalty scored); Despotovski (penalty missed); Dallku (penalty missed)

Yuvileiny Stadium, Sumy
Attendance: 18,500
Referee: Yevhen Herenda (Kalush)

Dynamo Kyiv	Vorskla Poltava

GK	1	(Ukraine) Oleksandr Shovkovskyi
DF	3	(Brazil) Betão
DF	30	(Morocco) Badr El Kaddouri	(yellow card) 48'
DF	34	(Ukraine) Yevhen Khacheridi
MF	4	(Romania) Tiberiu Ghioane	(yellow card) 17'	(substituted off) 62'
MF	5	(Croatia) Ognjen Vukojević
MF	8	(Ukraine) Oleksandr Aliyev		(substituted in) 62'
MF	11	(Finland) Roman Eremenko
MF	20	(Ukraine) Oleh Husyev
MF	70	(Ukraine) Andriy Yarmolenko		(substituted in) 81'
CF	25	(Ukraine) Artem Milevskyi (c)		(substituted off) 81'
Substitutes:
GK	55	(Ukraine) Oleksandr Rybka
MF	7	(Brazil) Carlos Corrêa
MF	14	(Ukraine) Serhiy Kravchenko
CF	33	(Nigeria) Emmanuel Okoduwa
MF	49	(Ukraine) Roman Zozulya
CF	77	(Brazil) Guilherme
MF	36	(Serbia) Miloš Ninković
Manager :
	(Russia) Valeriy Gazzaev

GK	1	(Ukraine) Serhiy Dolhanskyi (c)
DF	4	(Albania) Armend Dallku	(yellow card) 86'
DF	20	(Albania) Debatik Curri
DF	37	(Ukraine) Hryhoriy Yarmash
DF	48	(Ukraine) Volodymyr Chesnakov
MF	3	(North Macedonia) Filip Despotovski
MF	5	(Ukraine) Oleh Krasnopyorov
MF	7	(Serbia) Jovan Markoski		(substituted off) 46'
MF	8	(Ukraine) Denys Kulakov		(substituted off) 71'
MF	70	(Russia) Dmitriy Yesin
CF	17	(Ukraine) Vasyl Sachko		(substituted off) 71'
Substitutes:
GK	30	(Ukraine) Serhiy Velychko
CF	9	(Ukraine) Roman Bezus
CF	18	(Ukraine) Oleksiy Chychykov
DF	23	(Ukraine) Yevhen Pyeskov		(substituted in) 71'
DF	25	(Ukraine) Hennadiy Medvedyev
CF	27	(Albania) Ahmed Yanuzi		(substituted in) 71'
CF	40	(Ukraine) Roman Loktionov		(substituted in) 46'
Manager :
	(Ukraine) Mykola Pavlov

Assistant referees:

Vitaliy Demianenko (Uzhhorod)
Mykola Vasiuta (Rivne)

Fourth referee:

Yuriy Mozharovskyi (Lviv)

Match rules

- 90 minutes of regulation.
- No extra time of regulation if score is level.
- Penalty shoot-out if scores still level.
- Seven named substitutes, of which up to three may be used.
- No more than 9 foreign players on a field at one time for each team.

== Post-game commentaries ==
The Vorskla's head coach Mykola Pavlov stated that his team lost due to mistakes of his players who in penalty shoot out did not perform well, as well as wonderful play of the Dynamo's keeper Oleksandr Shovkovskyi. Shovkovskyi deflected one of last kicks, while another a player of Vorskla sent over a goal.

Five of eight players who participated in penalty shootout were from the Balkans and only two were from Ukraine.
