= 2009 Ukrainian Cup final =

- Event: 2008–09 Ukrainian Cup
| Vorskla Poltava | Shakhtar Donetsk |
| 1 | 0 |
- Date: 31 May 2009
- Venue: Dnipro Stadium, Dnipropetrovsk
- Attendance: 25,700
- Weather: 27 C

The 2009 Ukrainian Cup final was a football match that took place at the Dnipro Stadium on May 31, 2009. The match was the 18th Ukrainian Cup final and it was contested by Shakhtar Donetsk and Vorskla Poltava. The 2009 final was the first time a Ukrainian Cup final was held in Dnipropetrovsk. Vorskla Poltava, as Ukrainian Cup winners, qualified for the UEFA Europa League play-off round.

== Road to Dnipropetrovsk ==
All sixteen Ukrainian Premier League clubs did not have to go through qualification to get into the competition, so Vorskla and Shakhtar both qualified for the competition automatically.

Vorskla Poltava

| Round 1 | Zirka Kirovohrad | 0–1 | Vorskla Poltava |
| Round 2 | Obolon Kyiv | 1–4 | Vorskla Poltava |
| Quarter-final | Metalurh Donetsk | 0–1 | Vorskla Poltava |
| Semi-final | Metalist Kharkiv | 0–0 | Vorskla Poltava |
| Semi-final (Replay) | Vorskla Poltava | 2–0 | Metalist Kharkiv |

Shakhtar Donetsk

| Round 1 | Illichivets Mariupol | 0–3 | Shakhtar Donetsk |
| Round 2 | Zakarpattia Uzhhorod | 1–4 | Shakhtar Donetsk |
| Quarter-final | PFC Oleksandria | 1–2 | Shakhtar Donetsk |
| Semi-final | Shakhtar Donetsk | 1–0 | Dynamo Kyiv |

== Previous encounters ==
Prior to the final, Vorskla and Shakhtar had met six times in previous Ukrainian Cup competitions. Vorskla had never defeated Shakhtar, with its best performance being a 1–1 draw in the second leg of the quarter-finals in the 2007–08 edition. Shakhtar's best performance against Vorskla was in a second round encounter in the 1994–95 edition, an 8–0 drubbing.

== Match details ==
31 May 2009
17:00 LST

| Vorskla Poltava | 1–0 | Shakhtar Donetsk |
|---|---|---|
| Sachko 50' | Report |

Dnipro Stadium, Dnipropetrovsk
Attendance: 25,700
Referee: Vitaliy Hodulyan (Odesa)

| Vorskla Poltava | Shakhtar Donetsk |

Vorskla Poltava:
| GK | 1 | (Ukraine) Serhiy Dolhanskyi (c) |
| MF | 3 | (North Macedonia) Filip Despotovski |
| DF | 4 | (Albania) Armend Dallku |
| MF | 5 | (Ukraine) Oleh Krasnopyorov |
| MF | 7 | (Serbia) Jovan Markoski |
| FW | 8 | (Ukraine) Denys Kulakov | (substituted off) 81' |
| FW | 17 | (Ukraine) Vasyl Sachko | 50' | (substituted off) 71' |
| DF | 20 | (Albania) Debatik Curri |
| MF | 37 | (Ukraine) Hryhoriy Yarmash |
| DF | 48 | (Ukraine) Volodymyr Chesnakov | (yellow card) 90+2' |
| MF | 70 | (Ukraine) Dmytro Yesin | (substituted off) 89' |
Substitutes:
| GK | 12 | (Ukraine) Serhiy Velychko |
| FW | 11 | (Croatia) Denis Glavina | (substituted on) 81' |
| MF | 23 | (Ukraine) Yevhen Pyeskov |
| FW | 27 | (Albania) Ahmed Januzi | (substituted on) 71' |
| FW | 31 | (Ukraine) Oleksiy Chychykov |
| DF | 33 | (Ukraine) Andriy Boyko |
| MF | 40 | (Ukraine) Roman Loktionov | (substituted on) 89' |
Manager:
(Ukraine) Mykola Pavlov

Shaktar Donetsk:
| GK | 30 | (Ukraine) Andriy Pyatov |
| DF | 33 | (Croatia) Darijo Srna (c) |
| DF | 27 | (Ukraine) Dmytro Chyhrynskyi |
| DF | 5 | (Ukraine) Oleksandr Kucher |
| DF | 13 | (Ukraine) Vyacheslav Shevchuk |
| FW | 17 | (Brazil) Luiz Adriano |
| MF | 7 | (Brazil) Fernandinho | (red card) 57' |
| MF | 19 | (Ukraine) Oleksiy Hai | (substituted off) 55' |
| DF | 3 | (Czech Republic) Tomáš Hübschman |
| MF | 8 | (Brazil) Jádson | (substituted off) 75' |
| FW | 21 | (Ukraine) Oleksandr Hladkyi | (substituted off) 64' |
Substitutes:
| GK | 12 | (Ukraine) Rustam Khudzhamov |
| MF | 4 | (Serbia) Igor Duljaj |
| MF | 26 | (Romania) Răzvan Raț |
| MF | 22 | (Brazil) Willian | (substituted on) 55' |
| FW | 10 | (Ukraine) Yevhen Seleznyov | (substituted on) 64' |
| DF | 18 | (Poland) Mariusz Lewandowski | (substituted on) 75' |
| DF | 36 | (Ukraine) Oleksandr Chyzhov |
Manager:
(Romania) Mircea Lucescu

MATCH OFFICIALS

- Assistant referees:
  - Serhiy Tsymbal (Kyiv)
  - Oleksandr Shamych (Kyiv)
- Fourth official: Ihor Ischenko (Kyiv)

MATCH RULES

- 90 minutes.
- 30 minutes of extra-time if necessary.
- Penalty shoot-out if scores still level.
- Seven named substitutes
- Maximum of 3 substitutions.

Ukrainian Cup 2009 Winners

Vorskla Poltava
First title

== See also ==
- 2008–09 Ukrainian Cup
- 2008–09 Ukrainian Premier League
