= Pavlo Isenko =

Ukrainian footballer (born 2003)

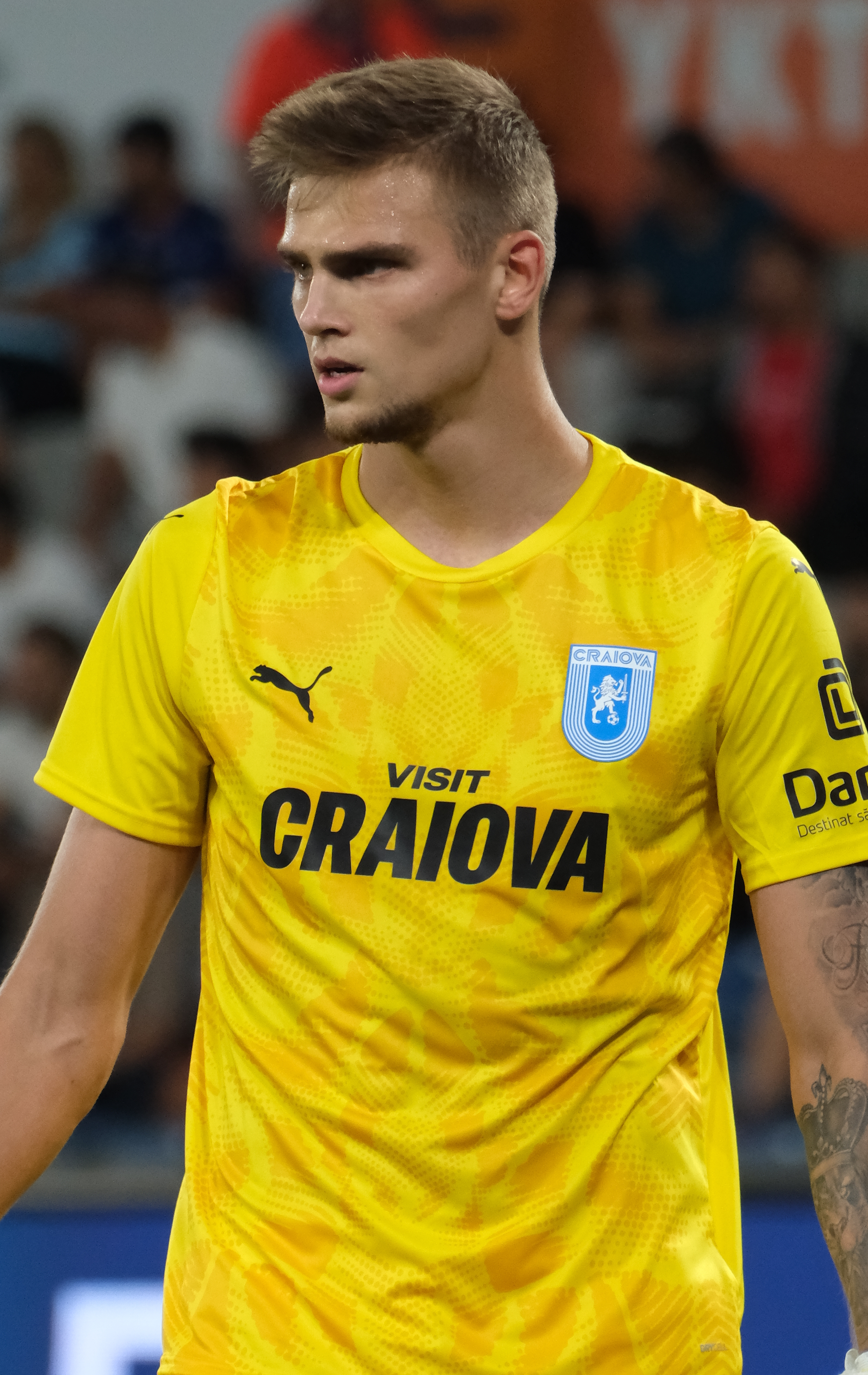
- Isenko with Universitatea Craiova in 2025

Personal information
- Full name: Pavlo Andriyovych Isenko
- Date of birth: 21 July 2003 (age 23)
- Place of birth: Poltava, Ukraine
- Height: 1.95 m (6 ft 5 in)
- Position: Goalkeeper

Team information
- Current team: Universitatea Craiova
- Number: 77

Youth career
- 2012–2020: Vorskla Poltava

Senior career*
Years	Team	Apps	(Gls)
2020–2025	Vorskla Poltava	76	(0)
2025–	Universitatea Craiova	18	(0)

International career
2019–2020	Ukraine U17	7	(0)
- * Club domestic league appearances and goals as of 19 March 2026

Pavlo Andriyovych Isenko (Ukrainian: Павло Андрійович Ісенко; born 21 July 2003) is a Ukrainian professional footballer who plays as a goalkeeper for Liga I club Universitatea Craiova.

== Club career ==
=== Vorskla Poltava ===
Isenko is a youth product of the Vorskla Poltava academy. In May 2019, he was included in the matchday squad for Vorskla's Ukrainian Premier League fixture against Chornomorets Odesa, but remained an unused substitute. In June 2020, he was promoted to the first team.

Isenko made his official debut on 24 June 2020, aged 16, coming on as a substitute for Dmytro Riznyk in the 119th minute of a Ukrainian Cup semi-final against Mariupol, ahead of the penalty shootout. He saved three of five penalties, helping his side win 3–2 and reach the final. On 8 July, he was on the bench as his side lost 7–8 on penalties to Dynamo Kyiv.

Isenko established himself as a regular starter in the second part of the 2022–23 season, amassing 15 league appearances. On 15 May 2024, he started for Vorskla Poltava in another cup final, where they were defeated 1–2 by Shakhtar Donetsk.

=== Universitatea Craiova ===
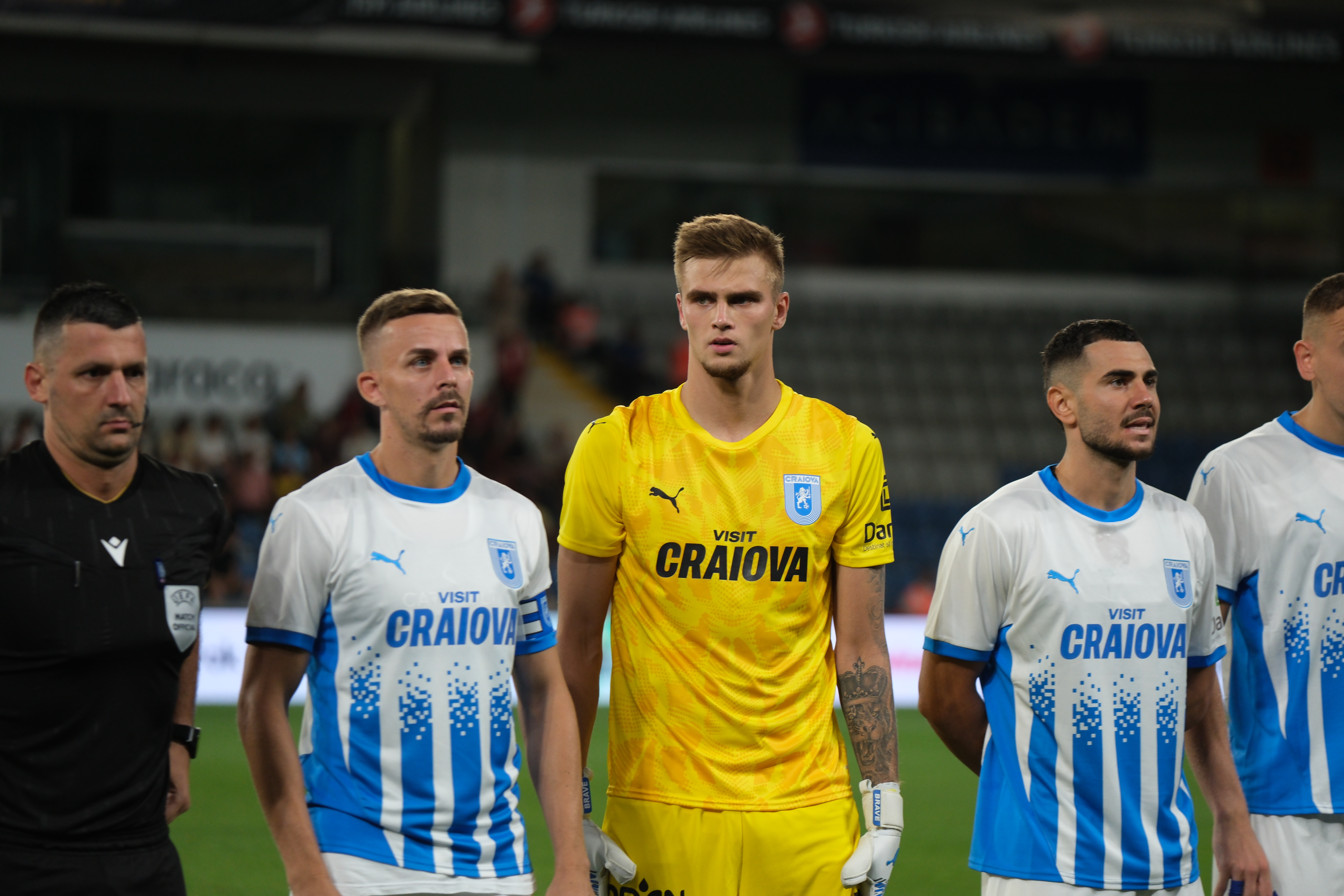
Isenko (center, in yellow) lining up for Universitatea Craiova in August 2025

On 14 July 2025, following the relegation of Vorskla Poltava to the Ukrainian First League, Isenko joined Romanian team Universitatea Craiova. Although some sources described the move as a free transfer, Craiova owner Mihai Rotaru revealed that the total cost of the deal was €600,000, including the solidarity contribution and agent fees. Four days later, he made his debut in a 3–1 home win over Argeș Pitești in the Liga I.

== International career ==
In 2019, Isenko was called up to the Ukraine national under-17 football team and took part in the qualifiers for the 2020 UEFA European Under-17 Championship in Estonia, which was later cancelled due to the COVID-19 pandemic.

== Career statistics ==
As of match played 19 March 2026

Appearances and goals by club, season and competition
Club	Season	League			National cup (Note: Includes Ukrainian Cup, Cupa României)		Europe		Other		Total	
Club	Season	Division	Apps	Goals	Apps	Goals	Apps	Goals	Apps	Goals	Apps	Goals
Vorskla Poltava	2019–20	Ukrainian Premier League	2	0	1	0	—		—		3	0
Vorskla Poltava	2020–21	Ukrainian Premier League	0	0	0	0	—		—		0	0
Vorskla Poltava	2021–22	Ukrainian Premier League	0	0	0	0	0	0	—		0	0
Vorskla Poltava	2022–23	Ukrainian Premier League	15	0	0	0	0	0	—		15	0
Vorskla Poltava	2023–24	Ukrainian Premier League	29	0	4	0	2 (Note: Appearances in UEFA Conference League)	0	—		35	0
Vorskla Poltava	2024–25	Ukrainian Premier League	29	0	1	0	—		2 (Note: Appearances in Ukrainian Premier League relegation play-offs)	0	32	0
Vorskla Poltava	Total		75	0	6	0	2	0	2	0	85	0
Universitatea Craiova	2025–26	Liga I	18	0	2	0	12	0	—		32	0
Universitatea Craiova	2026–27	Liga I	0	0	0	0	0	0	0	0	0	0
Universitatea Craiova	Total		18	0	2	0	12	0	0	0	32	0
Career total			93	0	8	0	14	0	2	0	117	0

== Honours ==
Vorskla Poltava

- Ukrainian Cup runner-up: 2019–20, 2023–24

Universitatea Craiova

- Liga I: 2025–26
- Cupa României: 2025–26
- Supercupa României: 2026
