= Danylo Kravchuk =

Ukrainian footballer

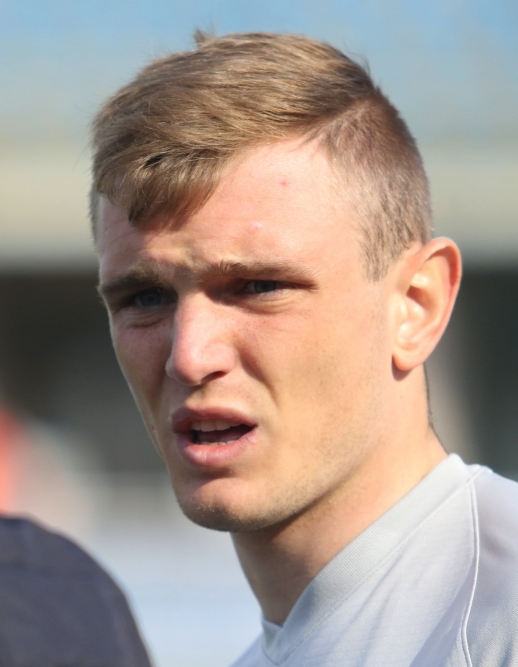
- Kravchuk with Vorskla Poltava in 2021

Personal information
- Full name: Danylo Viktorovych Kravchuk
- Date of birth: 2 July 2001 (age 25)
- Place of birth: Voznesensk, Ukraine
- Height: 1.80 m (5 ft 11 in)
- Position: Forward

Team information
- Current team: FSC Bukovyna Chernivtsi
- Number: 23

Youth career
- 2013: Youth Sportive School Kyiv
- 2013–2018: Arsenal Kyiv
- 2018–2020: Vorskla Poltava

Senior career*
Years	Team	Apps	(Gls)
2020–2023	Vorskla Poltava	30	(3)
2022–2023	→ Inhulets Petrove (loan)	12	(1)
2023–2025	Epitsentr Kamianets-Podilskyi	42	(24)
2025–26	LNZ Cherkasy	26	(3)
2026-	FSC Bukovyna Chernivtsi (Loan)	4	(1)

International career
2020–2021	Ukraine U21	5	(0)
- * Club domestic league appearances and goals as of 13/9/26 @ 14:22(AEST)

Danylo Viktorovych Kravchuk (Ukrainian: Данило Вікторович Кравчук; born 2 July 2001) is a Ukrainian professional footballer who plays as a forward for LNZ Cherkasy.

== Club career ==
Kravchuk is a product of Arsenal Kyiv's youth system. His first coach was Oleksandr Yemelyanenko. At least since 2014, he played in the Ukrainian Youth Football League.

In August 2018, Kravchuk signed a contract with Ukrainian Premier League side Vorskla Poltava and played for their youth team in the Ukrainian Premier League Reserves and Under 19 Championship for one-and-a-half seasons.

In March 2020, he was promoted to Vorskla's senior squad. Kravchuk made his debut in the Ukrainian Premier League as a substitute on 31 May 2020, playing in a home match against FC Lviv. On 8 July 2020, Kravchuk was on the roster for the 2020 Ukrainian Cup final, but remained on the bench. On 22 July 2021, Kravchuk made his continental competition debut in a 2–2 away draw against KuPS Kuopio, when he came on as a substitute for David Puclin at the end of the match.

After the championship resumed in summer of 2022 following the Russian full-scale invasion of Ukraine, Kravchuk was loaned out to fellow top-tier club Inhulets Petrove, for which he played 15 games and scored once, against Kryvbas Kryvyi Rih. Following that season, in summer of 2023, he joined Epitsentr Kamianets-Podilskyi in the second tier.

== International career ==
In November 2020, Kravchuk made his debut for the Ukraine under-21 team in the game against Malta during the 2021 UEFA European Under-21 Championship qualification, and played the last two games of the qualification cycle for Ukraine. In spring of 2021, he was called up for various friendlies for the Ukraine under-21 team.
