= Vladyslav Kulach =

Ukrainian footballer

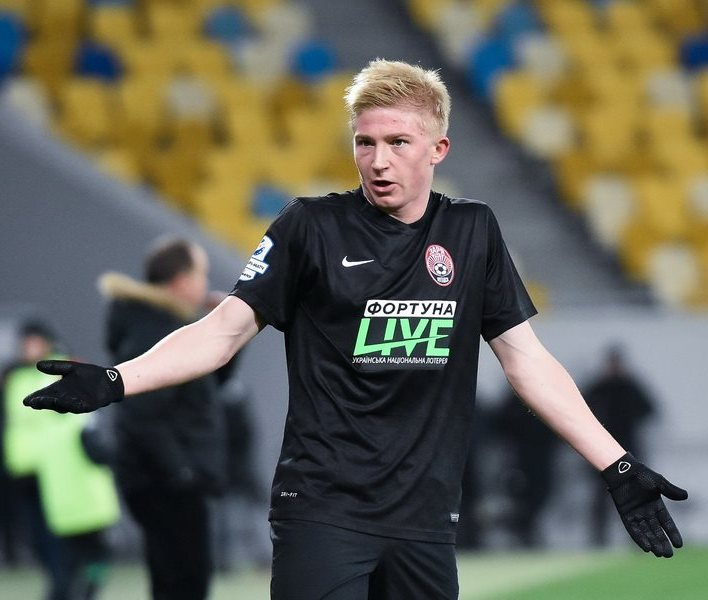
- Kulach with Zorya in 2016

Personal information
- Full name: Vladyslav Ihorovych Kulach
- Date of birth: 7 May 1993 (age 33)
- Place of birth: Donetsk, Ukraine
- Height: 1.77 m (5 ft 10 in)
- Position: Forward

Team information
- Current team: Mayak Sarny

Youth career
- 2006–2009: Olimpik Donetsk
- 2010: Shakhtar Donetsk

Senior career*
| Years | Team | Apps | (Gls) |
| 2010–2019 | Shakhtar Donetsk | 0 | (0) |
| 2010 | → Shakhtar-3 Donetsk | 17 | (5) |
| 2013–2014 | → Illichivets Mariupol (loan) | 36 | (5) |
| 2015 | → Metalurh Zaporizhzhia (loan) | 9 | (0) |
| 2015–2016 | → Stal Dniprodzerzhynsk (loan) | 15 | (5) |
| 2016 | → Eskişehirspor (loan) | 4 | (0) |
| 2016–2017 | → Zorya Luhansk (loan) | 14 | (2) |
| 2017–2018 | → Vorskla Poltava (loan) | 36 | (10) |
| 2019 | → Oleksandriya (loan) | 0 | (0) |
| 2019 | → Honvéd (loan) | 3 | (0) |
| 2020–2021 | Vorskla Poltava | 30 | (17) |
| 2021–2023 | Dynamo Kyiv | 7 | (1) |
| 2023–2024 | Zira | 34 | (5) |
| 2024 | Pyunik | 0 | (0) |
| 2025 | Vorskla Poltava | 6 | (1) |
| 2025–2026 | Chornomorets Odesa | 18 | (2) |
| 2026– | Mayak Sarny | 2 | (2) |

International career
| 2009 | Ukraine U17 | 3 | (0) |
| 2010–2011 | Ukraine U18 | 6 | (0) |
| 2010–2012 | Ukraine U19 | 16 | (4) |
| 2013–2014 | Ukraine U21 | 6 | (2) |

Managerial career
- 2026–: Mayak Sarny
- * Club domestic league appearances and goals as of 14 August 2026

Vladyslav Ihorovych Kulach (Ukrainian: Владислав Ігорович Кулач; born 7 May 1993) is a Ukrainian professional footballer who plays as a striker.

Joining Mayak Sarny in 2026, Kulach also performs as the club's manager.

== Career ==
Kulach is a product of FC Olimpik Donetsk academy, with which he participated in competitions of the Ukrainian Youth Football League. In 2010, he signed with FC Shakhtar Donetsk. Until 2013, he played for various Shakhtar reserve teams, and after that, he was loaned out to other clubs. While still playing at the Olimpik academy, Kulach was called up to play for the Ukraine national junior teams, for which he became a regular after signing with Shakhtar.

Kulach was a member of the Ukraine U21 national team, where he was called-up first time by Serhiy Kovalets for Valeriy Lobanovskyi Memorial Tournament in 2013.

In 2016, he went on to play abroad for the first time, when he was loaned to Eskişehirspor, which struggled in the Turkish Super League. Kulach had recorded only 4 appearances for the club, and after Eskişehirspor was eventually relegated, Kulach returned to Shakhtar. The next season, he was loaned to Zorya Luhansk, with which Kulach made his first appearance in UEFA club competitions, 2016–17 UEFA Europa League.

In 2020, without playing a single game for the first team, Kulach left Shakhtar and signed with Vorskla Poltava. In the first season with Poltava, he reached the 2020 Ukrainian Cup final, where Vorskla lost to Dynamo Kyiv on penalty. The very next season, Kulach became a top scorer of the 2020–21 Ukrainian Premier League with Vorskla and qualified for the UEFA club competitions.

In January 2023 he moved to Zira.

On 7 July 2024, Pyunik announced the signing of Kulach. Less than one month later, on 4 August 2024, Pyunik announced that Kulach had left the club due to personal issues.

=== Chornomorets Odesa ===
On 14 July 2025, Kulach joined Chornomorets Odesa. On 13 September 2025 in the 6th round match of Ukrainian First League 2025–26 between Chornomorets and Metalurh Zaporizhzhia he made his official debut as a player of Chornomorets. On 13 October 2025 in the 11th round match of the Ukrainian First League between Prykarpattia-Blaho and Chornomorets Kulach scored his first goal as a player of Chornomorets. He left the team on June 30, 2026.

On 18 July 2026, Kulach joined Mayak Sarny.

== Honours ==
Chornomorets Odesa

- Ukrainian First League runner-up: 2025–26

Individual

- Ukrainian Premier League top scorer: 2020–21 (15 goals)
- Ukrainian Premier League player of the Month: 2020–21 (October)
