= Amilcar Codjovi =

Spanish footballer

Personal information
- Full name: Amilcar Adulai Djau Codjovi
- Date of birth: 22 February 2002 (age 24)
- Place of birth: Zaragoza, Spain
- Height: 1.82 m (6 ft 0 in)
- Position: Midfielder

Team information
- Current team: Vorskla Poltava
- Number: 65

Youth career
- 2012–2017: Rayo Vallecano
- 2018–2020: Morecambe

Senior career*
Years	Team	Apps	(Gls)
2021–2022	Vorskla Poltava	7	(1)
2022–2023	Ayia Napa	24	(0)
2024–	Vorskla Poltava	2	(0)
- * Club domestic league appearances and goals as of 16 May 2024

Amilcar Adulai Djau Codjovi (born 22 February 2002) is a Spanish professional footballer who plays as a midfielder for Vorskla Poltava.

== Career ==
Born in Spain to parents from Ivory Coast and Guinea-Bissau, Codjovi is a product of the Rayo Vallecano and Morecambe from Morecambe, Lancashire, England youth sportive systems.

After the long trial period, in January 2021, he signed contract with the Ukrainian Premier League club Vorskla Poltava and played for this club in the Ukrainian Premier League Reserves. Codjovi made his debut for Vorskla in the Ukrainian Premier League as a second half-time substituted player in the winning home match against FC Inhulets Petrove on 2 October 2021.
