= Yevhen Pyeskov =

Ukrainian footballer (born 1981)

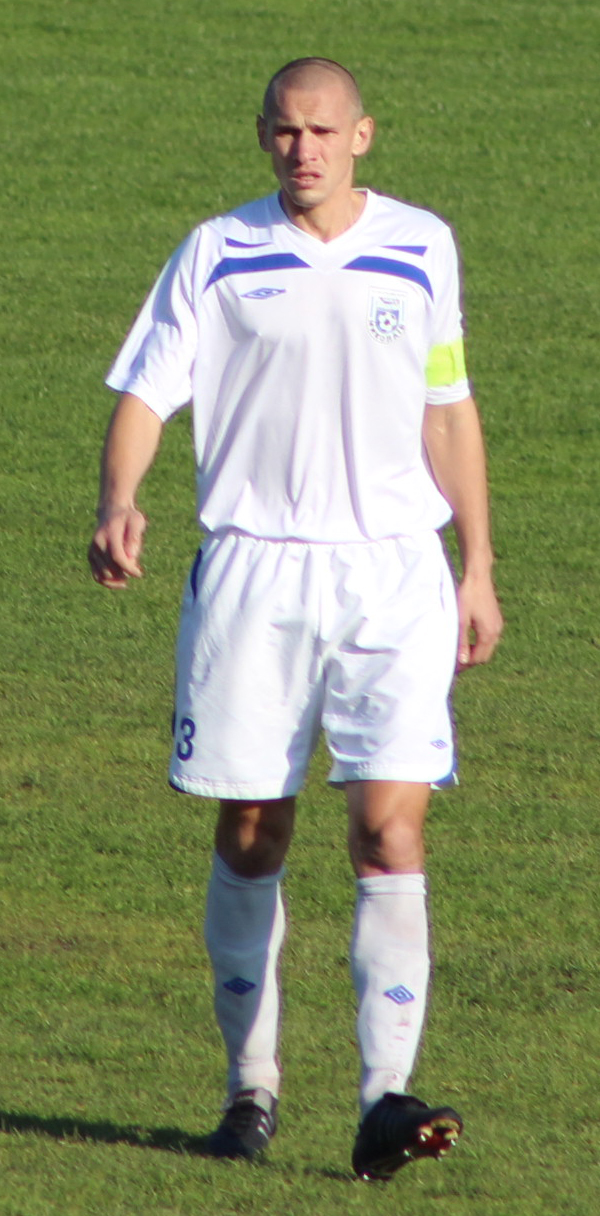

Personal information
- Full name: Yevhen Vitaliyovych Pyeskov
- Date of birth: 22 September 1981 (age 45)
- Place of birth: Zaporizhzhia, Ukrainian SSR
- Height: 1.86 m (6 ft 1 in)
- Position: Midfielder

Youth career
- 1998–1999: Torpedo Zaporizhzhia

Senior career*
Years	Team	Apps	(Gls)
1999–2000	Torpedo Zaporizhzhia	0	(0)
2002–2003	Uholyok Dymytrov	8	(0)
2003–2005	Krystal Kherson	28	(3)
2005–2006	PFC Sevastopol	41	(8)
2006–2010	Vorskla Poltava	1	(0)
2006–2007	→ Sevastopol (loan)	14	(1)
2010	Sevastopol	0	(0)
2010–2013	Vorskla Poltava	24	(0)
2013	Mykolaiv	18	(1)
2014–	Motor Zaporizhzhia		
- * Club domestic league appearances and goals

Yevhen Pyeskov (Ukrainian: Євген Пєсков; born 22 September 1981) is a professional Ukrainian football midfielder.

== Career ==
Pyeskov played for Vorskla Poltava in the Ukrainian Premier League. He joined Vorskla Poltava from PFC Sevastopol in December 2006.
