= Pavlo Rebenok =

Ukrainian footballer (born 1985)

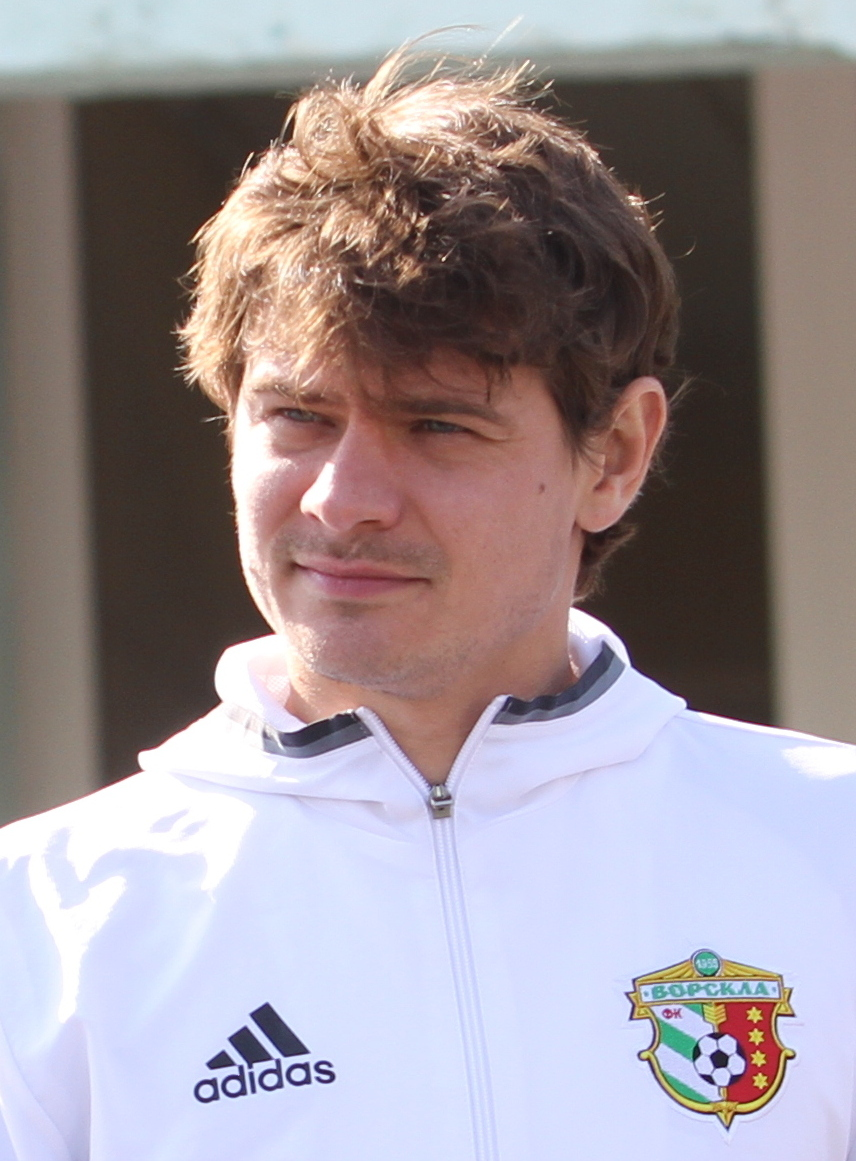

Personal information
- Full name: Pavlo Viktorovych Rebenok
- Date of birth: 23 July 1985 (age 41)
- Place of birth: Ordzhonikidze, Ukrainian SSR
- Height: 1.81 m (5 ft 11 in)
- Position: Midfielder

Team information
- Current team: Vorskla Poltava U-21 (assistant)

Youth career
- –2003: Dnipro Dnipropetrovsk

Senior career*
Years	Team	Apps	(Gls)
2003–2004	Dnipro-3 Dnipropetrovsk	?	(?)
2004	Uralan Elista	0	(0)
2004–2007	Vorskla Poltava	36	(1)
2008–2009	Metalist Kharkiv	2	(0)
2008–2009	→ Chornomorets Odesa (loan)	17	(0)
2009–2011	Chornomorets Odesa	53	(2)
2011–2012	Vorskla Poltava	27	(6)
2012–2015	Metalist Kharkiv	19	(1)
2013	→ Vorskla Poltava (loan)	30	(1)
2014	→ Chornomorets Odesa (loan)	11	(0)
2015	Torpedo-BelAZ Zhodino	12	(0)
2016–2021	Vorskla Poltava	133	(7)
Total		340	(18)

Managerial career
- 2021–2024: Vorskla Poltava U19 (assistant)
- 2024–2025: Vorskla-2 Poltava (assistant)
- 2025: Vorskla Poltava U19 (assistant)
- 2025–: Hirnyk-Sport Horishni Plavni (assistant)
- * Club domestic league appearances and goals as of 30 October 2025

Pavlo Rebenok (Ukrainian: Павло Вікторович Ребенок; born 23 July 1985) is a Ukrainian football manager and former player who played as a left midfielder.

== Career ==
Initially, he joined Chornomorets on loan from Metalist Kharkiv in July 2008 in hopes of finding more playing time, as in Metalist he was limited to only 2 games during the entire season. In June 2012 he signed a three-year deal with Metalist Kharkiv.

== Managerial career ==
Since July 1, 2021, Rebenok was assistant manager of Vorskla U19 for three years. Since July 1, 2024, he has been assistant manager of Vorskla-2. Since January 14, 2025, Rebenok has again been assistant manager of Vorskla U19. Since July 1, 2025, he has been assistant manager of Hirnyk-Sport Horishni Plavni where Rebenok supports Jovan Markoski.
