= Illya Krupskyi =

Ukrainian footballer

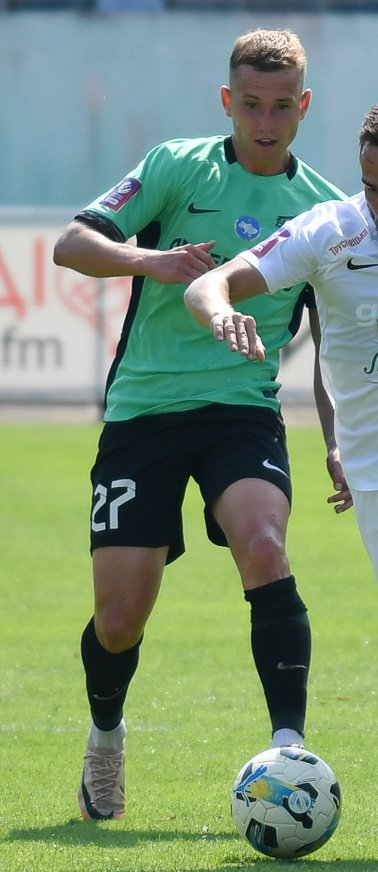

Personal information
- Full name: Illya Oleksiyovych Krupskyi
- Date of birth: 2 October 2004 (age 22)
- Place of birth: Vinnytsia, Ukraine
- Height: 1.78 m (5 ft 10 in)
- Position: Defender

Team information
- Current team: Kharkiv
- Number: 27

Youth career
- 2017–2019: Youth Sportive School Vinnytsia
- 2019–2021: Metalurh Zaporizhzhia

Senior career*
Years	Team	Apps	(Gls)
2021–2025	Vorskla Poltava	47	(1)
2025–	Kharkiv	36	(1)
2025	→ Vorskla Poltava (loan)	12	(0)

International career^{‡}
2024–2026	Ukraine U21	18	(1)
2024	Ukraine U23	9	(0)
2026–	Ukraine	2	(0)
- * Club domestic league appearances and goals as of 19 September 2026 ‡ National team caps and goals as of 6 October 2026

Illya Krupskyi (Ukrainian: Ілля Олексійович Крупський; born 2 October 2004) is a Ukrainian professional footballer who plays as a defender for Kharkiv and the Ukraine national team.

== Career ==
Krupskyi is a product of the academies of Vinnytsia and Metalurh Zaporizhzhia.

In February 2021 he was signed by FC Vorskla Poltava. He made his debut as a second-half substitute against FC Dynamo Kyiv on 1 May 2021.

== International career ==
In May 2024, Krupskyi was called up by Ruslan Rotan to the Ukraine Olympic football team squad to play at the 2024 Maurice Revello Tournament in France.

== Career statistics ==
=== Club ===
As of match played 19 September 2026

Appearances and goals by club, season and competition
Club	Season	League			Cup		Europe		Other		Total	
Club	Season	Division	Apps	Goals	Apps	Goals	Apps	Goals	Apps	Goals	Apps	Goals
Vorskla Poltava	2020–21	Ukrainian Premier League	1	0	—		—		—		1	0
Vorskla Poltava	2021–22	Ukrainian Premier League	1	0	—		—		—		1	0
Vorskla Poltava	2022–23	Ukrainian Premier League	7	0	—		—		—		7	0
Vorskla Poltava	2023–24	Ukrainian Premier League	23	1	4	0	2 (Note: Appearances in UEFA Conference League)	0	—		29	1
Vorskla Poltava	2024–25	Ukrainian Premier League	15	0	0	0	—		—		15	0
Vorskla Poltava	Total		47	1	4	0	2	0	—		53	1
Metalist Kharkiv	2025–26	Ukrainian Premier League	30	0	4	0	—		—		34	0
Metalist Kharkiv	2026–27	Ukrainian Premier League	6	1	2	0	—		—		8	1
Metalist Kharkiv	Total		36	1	6	0	—		—		42	1
Vorskla Poltava (loan)	2024–25	Ukrainian Premier League	12	0	—		—		—		12	0
Career total			95	2	10	0	2	0	0	0	107	2

=== International ===
As of match played 5 October 2026

Appearances and goals by national team and year
National team	Year	Apps	Goals
Ukraine	2026	2	0
Total		2	0
