= Daniil Khrypchuk =

Ukrainian footballer (born 2003)

Personal information
- Full name: Daniil Serhiyovych Khrypchuk
- Date of birth: 9 December 2003 (age 22)
- Place of birth: Kharkiv, Ukraine
- Height: 1.92 m (6 ft 4 in)
- Position: Midfielder

Team information
- Current team: Kolos Kovalivka
- Number: 45

Youth career
- 2013–2015: Youth Sportive School #9 Kharkiv
- 2015–2016: Metalist Kharkiv
- 2016–2020: Dynamo Kyiv

Senior career*
| Years | Team | Apps | (Gls) |
| 2021 | Vorskla Poltava II | | |
| 2021–2025 | Vorskla Poltava | 52 | (0) |
| 2026– | Kolos Kovalivka | 6 | (1) |

International career^{‡}
| 2021 | Ukraine U19 | 1 | (0) |
- * Club domestic league appearances and goals as of 3 June 2026 ‡ National team caps and goals as of 7 December 2022

Daniil Serhiyovych Khrypchuk (Ukrainian: Даніїл Сергійович Хрипчук; born 9 December 2003) is a Ukrainian professional footballer who plays as a midfielder for Kolos Kovalivka in the Ukrainian Premier League.

== Career ==
Khrypchuk is a product of Youth Sportive School #9 and Metalist in Kharkiv and Dynamo Kyiv systems.

In September 2020 he was signed by Vorskla Poltava. He made his debut as a second half-taim substituted player for Vorskla Poltava in the Ukrainian Premier League in a home winning match against Zorya Luhansk on 17 April 2021.

== International career ==
In March 2021, Khrypchuk was called up to the preliminary squad of the Ukraine national under-18 football team, with which he was expected to participate in the training preparation to qualifying matches for the youth Euro 2022, but later the training was canceled due to the coronavirus pandemic.
