= Najeeb Yakubu =

Nigerien footballer (born 2000)

Personal information
- Date of birth: 1 May 2000 (age 26)
- Place of birth: Accra, Ghana
- Height: 1.82 m (6 ft 0 in)
- Position: Right-back

Team information
- Current team: Persijap Jepara
- Number: 55

Youth career
- UniStar Academy
- –2017: New Town Youth

Senior career*
| Years | Team | Apps | (Gls) |
| 2018 | Niger Tornadoes | | |
| 2018–2024 | Vorskla Poltava | 66 | (2) |
| 2022–2023 | → Ilves (loan) | 17 | (0) |
| 2024–2025 | Prishtina | 17 | (0) |
| 2025–2026 | Persijap Jepara | 22 | (0) |
| 2026 | Garudayaksa | 1 | (0) |
| 2026– | Persijap Jepara | 6 | (0) |

International career^{‡}
| 2017 | Ghana U17 | 9 | (0) |
| 2022– | Niger | 17 | (0) |
- * Club domestic league appearances and goals as of 7 November 2026 ‡ National team caps and goals as of 12 October 2025

Najeeb Yakubu (born 1 May 2000) is a professional footballer who plays as a right-back for Super League club Persijap Jepara. Born in Ghana, he plays for the Niger national team.

== Club career ==
On 20 April 2022, Yakubu joined CD Lugo in Spain under the special FIFA regulations related to the 2022 Russian invasion of Ukraine. However, he only participated in training and did not appear in any league games.

In August 2022 he once again suspended his contract with Vorskla under the same regulations, this time until 30 June 2023, and moved to Ilves in Finnish Veikkausliiga.

== International career ==
Born in Ghana, Yakubu is of Nigerien descent.

He was called up to the Niger national team for a set of friendlies in March 2022. He debuted with Niger as a late substitute in a 3–0 friendly loss to Egypt on 23 September 2022.

== Career statistics ==
=== Club ===
As of 7 November 2026

| Club | Season | League | | | Cup (Note: Includes Ukrainian Cup and Suomen Cup) | | Continental | | Other | | Total | |
| Club | Season | Division | Apps | Goals | Apps | Goals | Apps | Goals | Apps | Goals | Apps | Goals |
|---|---|---|---|---|---|---|---|---|---|---|---|---|
| Vorskla Poltava | 2018–19 | Ukrainian Premier League | 5 | 1 | 1 | 0 | 2 (Note: Appearances in the UEFA Europa League) | 0 | – | | 6 | 1 |
| Vorskla Poltava | 2019–20 | Ukrainian Premier League | 13 | 1 | 2 | 0 | – | | – | | 15 | 1 |
| Vorskla Poltava | 2020–21 | Ukrainian Premier League | 19 | 0 | 2 | 0 | – | | – | | 21 | 0 |
| Vorskla Poltava | 2021–22 | Ukrainian Premier League | 16 | 0 | 1 | 0 | 2 (Note: Appearances in the UEFA Europa Conference League) | 0 | – | | 19 | 0 |
| Vorskla Poltava | 2022–23 | Ukrainian Premier League | 0 | 0 | 0 | 0 | 0 | 0 | – | | 0 | 0 |
| Vorskla Poltava | 2023–24 | Ukrainian Premier League | 13 | 0 | 2 | 0 | – | | – | | 15 | 0 |
| Vorskla Poltava | Total | | 66 | 2 | 8 | 0 | 4 | 0 | 0 | 0 | 78 | 2 |
| Ilves (loan) | 2022 | Veikkausliiga | 8 | 0 | – | | – | | – | | 8 | 0 |
| Ilves (loan) | 2023 | Veikkausliiga | 9 | 0 | 1 | 0 | – | | 1 (Note: Includes Finnish League Cup) | 0 | 11 | 0 |
| Ilves (loan) | Total | | 17 | 0 | 1 | 0 | 0 | 0 | 1 | 0 | 19 | 0 |
| Prishtina | 2024–25 | Kosovo Superleague | 17 | 0 | 0 | 0 | – | | – | | 17 | 0 |
| Persijap Jepara | 2025–26 | Super League | 22 | 0 | – | | – | | – | | 22 | 0 |
| Garudayaksa | 2026–27 | Super League | 1 | 0 | 0 | 0 | – | | – | | 1 | 0 |
| Persijap Jepara | 2026–27 | Super League | 6 | 0 | – | | – | | – | | 6 | 0 |
| Career total | | | 129 | 2 | 9 | 0 | 4 | 0 | 1 | 0 | 143 | 2 |

=== International ===
As of match played 18 November 2024

Niger
| Year | Apps | Goals |
|---|---|---|
| 2022 | 2 | 0 |
| 2023 | 7 | 0 |
| 2024 | 6 | 0 |
| Total | 15 | 0 |

== Honours ==
Ilves

- Finnish Cup: 2023
