= Ivan Nesterenko =

Ukrainian footballer

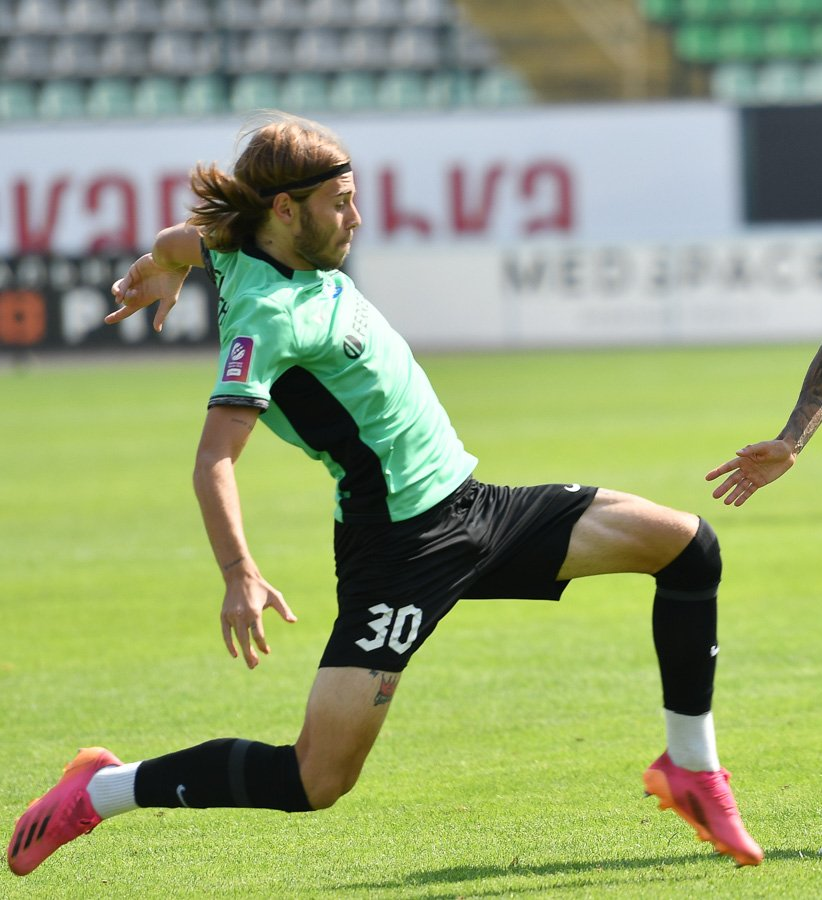

Personal information
- Full name: Ivan Vasylyovych Nesterenko
- Date of birth: 23 July 2003 (age 23)
- Place of birth: Zaporizhzhia, Ukraine
- Height: 1.78 m (5 ft 10 in)
- Position: Midfielder

Team information
- Current team: Obolon Kyiv
- Number: 40

Youth career
- 2011–2016: Metalurh Zaporizhzhia
- 2016–2018: Shakhtar Donetsk
- 2018–2020: Metalurh Zaporizhzhia

Senior career*
Years	Team	Apps	(Gls)
2020–2021	Metalurh-2 Zaporizhzhia	13	(6)
2021–2025	Vorskla Poltava	56	(4)
2025–26	Obolon Kyiv	22	(1)
2026-	FC Zorya Luhansk	9	(2)
- * Club domestic league appearances and goals as of 15/10/26 @ 07:52(AEST)

Ivan Vasylyovych Nesterenko (Ukrainian: Іван Васильович Нестеренко; born 23 July 2003) is a Ukrainian professional footballer who plays as a midfielder for Obolon Kyiv in the Ukrainian Premier League.

== Career ==
Nesterenko is a product of Metalurh Zaporizhzhia and Shakhtar Donetsk systems.

In January 2021 he was signed by Vorskla Poltava. He made his debut as a second half-time substituted player for Vorskla Poltava in the Ukrainian Premier League in an away losing match against FC Kolos Kovalivka on 24 April 2021.

== International career ==
In March 2021, Nesterenko was called up to the preliminary squad of the Ukraine national under-18 football team, with which he was expected to participate in the training preparation to qualifying matches for the youth Euro 2022, but later the training was canceled due to the coronavirus pandemic.
