= Serhiy Dolhanskyi =

Ukrainian footballer (born 1974)

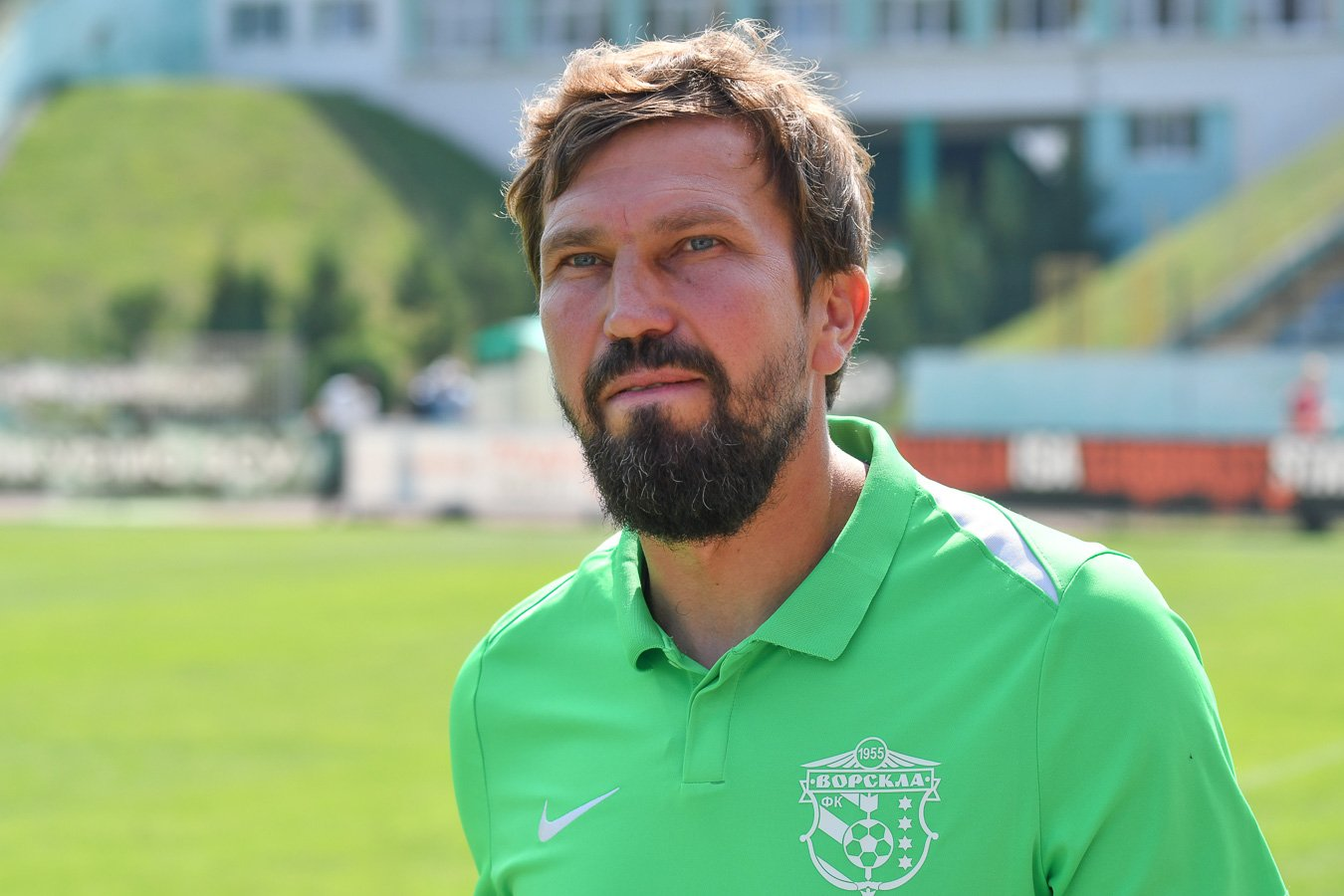

Personal information
- Full name: Serhiy Mykolayovych Dolhanskyi
- Date of birth: 15 September 1974 (age 52)
- Place of birth: Zdolbuniv, Ukrainian SSR
- Height: 1.88 m (6 ft 2 in)
- Position: Goalkeeper

Team information
- Current team: Metalist 1925 Kharkiv (goalkeeping coach)

Senior career*
Years	Team	Apps	(Gls)
1992	Veres Rivne	16	(0)
1993–1994	Metalist Kharkiv	12	(0)
1994–1995	Veres Rivne	18	(0)
1996–1998	Chornomorets Odesa	65	(0)
1999	Kryvbas Kryvyi Rih	0	(0)
1999	→ Kryvbas-2 Kryvyi Rih	10	(0)
2000	CSKA Kyiv	0	(0)
2000	→ CSKA-2 Kyiv	15	(0)
2000	→ Systema-Boreks Borodianka (loan)	1	(0)
2001	Vorskla Poltava	26	(0)
2001	→ Vorskla-2 Poltava	5	(0)
2002	Shakhtar-2 Donetsk	0	(0)
2002	→ Shakhtar-2 Donetsk	5	(0)
2003	Vorskla Poltava	18	(0)
2004	Metalurh Donetsk	21	(0)
2005–2013	Vorskla Poltava	168	(0)
2017–2018	Zhemchuzhyna Odesa	0	(0)
Total		380	(0)

International career
1993	Ukraine U21	6	(0)

Managerial career
- 2016–2018: Zhemchuzhyna Odesa (goalkeeping coach)
- 2019–2024: Vorskla Poltava (goalkeeping coach)
- 2024: Vorskla Poltava (caretaker)
- 2024: Vorskla Poltava
- 2024–2025: Vorskla Poltava (goalkeeping coach)
- 2025-: Metalist 1925 Kharkiv (goalkeeping coach)
- * Club domestic league appearances and goals

Serhiy Mykolayovych Dolhanskyi (Ukrainian: Сергій Миколайович Долганський; born 15 September 1974) is a Ukrainian professional football coach and a former goalkeeper. He is the goalkeeping coach of Ukrainian Premier League club Vorskla Poltava.

== Career ==
Native of Zdolbuniv in Volhynian region, Dolhanskyi started his professional football career in Veres Rivne. He took part in the first football season after Ukraine gained its full independence from the Soviet Union. That season the Rivne club played in the second tier but gained promotion at the end. Dolhanskyi made a debut appearance on 17 March 1992 in away match against Krystal Chortkiv when he came out on substitution on 80th minute replacing a Russian goalkeeper Viktor Derbunov and yielded a tying goal from the Chortkiv team's captain Vyacheslav Baklanov, which ended the match 2:2. During the 1992 season Dolhanskyi only played in two matches and in both was substituting the club's main goalie Derbunov.

Upon the promotion, the next season Dolhanskyi became a regular on the first team of Veres and played the whole first half of the season. Following the winter break he was transferred to the former Soviet top club Metalist Kharkiv, but only recorded three matches with them by end of the second half of the season. He remained with Metalist for the next season but spent the second half of it on the bench. After relegation of Metalist, next season 1994–95 Dolhanskyi returned to Veres with which he also placed last in the tournament table.

For the 1995–96 season Dolhanskyi transferred to the vice-champions of Ukraine Chornomorets Odesa and made his debut at club's continental competitions coming on substitution for Oleh Suslov in home match against the Maltese Hibernians. Outperformed by Oleh Suslov, he was his substitute for the whole season playing only in four matches and all as substitute. That season Chornomerets again placed 2nd behind Dynamo Kyiv. After that and until 1999 Dolhanskyi was made the main goalkeeper of the "sailors".

In 1998 Chornomorets relegated to the second tier and during the winter break Dolhanskyi transferred to Kryvbas Kryvyi Rih which at that time was one of the better teams in Ukraine. However, Dolhanskyi was placed in its reserve team which played at the third tier, and he was not even made the main goalkeeper. After failing to make the first team Dolhanskyi signed with CSKA Kyiv during the 1999–2000 season winter break. However, in Kyiv he also was not able to play for the first team.

During the 2000–01 season winter break he signed with for the first time with Vorskla Poltava where he finally found his game. During his period in Poltava, Vorskla struggled to remain in the top tier. Also for a short while Dolhanskyi tried his luck to play for the champions Shakhtar Donetsk, but after few matches for its reserve team, he returned back to Vorskla. Later he also played for a short while for the Donetsk's second club Metalurh Donetsk and even made an appearance for them in the clubs' continental competitions. He re-joined Vorskla from Metalurh Donetsk in February 2005 and remained with the Poltava team until 2013 when he practically retired from professional football.

In 2017-2018 Dolhanskyi also was considered as a "playing coach" for the newly created Zhemchuzhyna Odesa that briefly existed and was soon dissolved. After Zhemchuzhyna, he returned to Poltava.
