= Dmytro Riznyk =

Ukrainian footballer (born 1999)

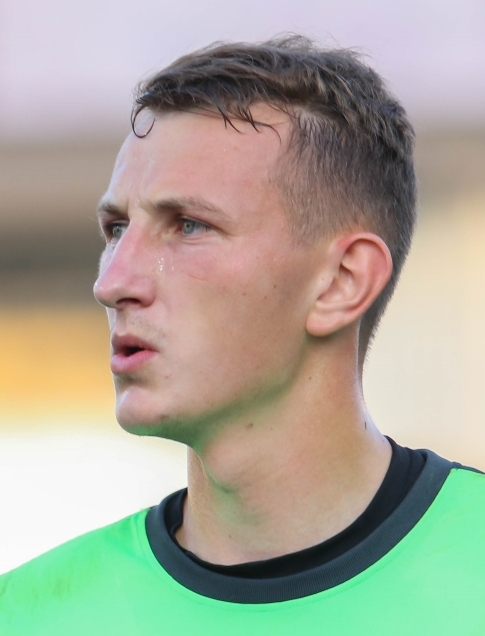
- Riznyk with Vorskla Poltava in 2021

Personal information
- Full name: Dmytro Hryhorovych Riznyk
- Date of birth: 30 January 1999 (age 27)
- Place of birth: Andriivka, Ukraine
- Height: 1.91 m (6 ft 3 in)
- Position: Goalkeeper

Team information
- Current team: Shakhtar Donetsk
- Number: 31

Youth career
- 2011–2016: Vorskla Poltava

Senior career*
Years	Team	Apps	(Gls)
2016–2023	Vorskla Poltava	70	(0)
2023–	Shakhtar Donetsk	86	(0)

International career^{‡}
2018	Ukraine U19	1	(0)
2018–2019	Ukraine U20	2	(0)
2020	Ukraine U21	1	(0)
2021–	Ukraine	7	(0)
Medal record
Men's football
Representing Ukraine
UEFA European Under-19 Championship
Bronze medal – third place	2018 Finland
- * Club domestic league appearances and goals as of 30 October 2026 ‡ National team caps and goals as of 18 November 2026

Dmytro Hryhorovych Riznyk (Ukrainian: Дмитро Григорович Різник; born 30 January 1999) is a Ukrainian professional footballer who plays as a goalkeeper for Shakhtar Donetsk in the Ukrainian Premier League and the Ukraine national team.

== Career ==
Riznyk is a product of FC Vorskla Youth Sportive School from his native Poltava. In July 2016 he was promoted to the Vorskla main squad to compete in the Ukrainian Premier League Reserves. And in September 2019 Riznyk was promoted to the main-squad team of FC Vorskla in the Ukrainian Premier League.

He made his debut as a start-squad player for Vorskla Poltava in the Ukrainian Premier League in a losing match against FC Zorya Luhansk on 26 October 2019.

On 10 February 2023, Shakhtar Donetsk announced the signing of Riznyk on a five-year contract.

On 27 November 2024 in a game against PSV, Riznyk made 15 saves. The most ever in a single UCL or European Cup game.

== International career ==
=== Youth ===
From 2011, until 2012, Riznyk has been part of Ukraine at youth international level, respectively has been part of the U19. U20 and U21 teams and he with these teams played four matches. He was a part of the Ukraine U20 that won the 2019 FIFA U-20 World Cup, even if he not played any game and spent a time on the bench.

=== Senior ===
He made his debut for Ukraine national football team on 11 November 2021 in a friendly against Bulgaria.

== Career statistics ==
=== Club ===
As of 3 November 2026

Appearances and goals by club, season and competition
Club	Season	League			Cup		Continental		Other		Total	
Club	Season	Division	Apps	Goals	Apps	Goals	Apps	Goals	Apps	Goals	Apps	Goals
Vorskla Poltava	2019–20	Ukrainian Premier League	14	0	4	0	0	0	0	0	18	0
Vorskla Poltava	2020–21	Ukrainian Premier League	24	0	1	0	0	0	0	0	25	0
Vorskla Poltava	2021–22	Ukrainian Premier League	17	0	1	0	2 (Note: Appearance(s) in UEFA Europa Conference League)	0	0	0	20	0
Vorskla Poltava	2022–23	Ukrainian Premier League	15	0	0	0	2	0	0	0	17	0
Vorskla Poltava	Total		70	0	6	0	4	0	0	0	80	0
Shakhtar Donetsk	2022–23	Ukrainian Premier League	0	0	0	0	0	0	0	0	0	0
Shakhtar Donetsk	2023–24	Ukrainian Premier League	27	0	4	0	8 (Note: Six appearances in UEFA Champions League, two appearances in UEFA Europa League)	0	0	0	39	0
Shakhtar Donetsk	2024–25	Ukrainian Premier League	24	0	4	0	8 (Note: Appearances in UEFA Champions League)	0	0	0	36	0
Shakhtar Donetsk	2025–26	Ukrainian Premier League	24	0	1	0	16 (Note: Six appearances in UEFA Europa League, ten appearances in UEFA Conference League)	0	—		41	0
Shakhtar Donetsk	2026–27	Ukrainian Premier League	11	0	1	0	4	0	—		16	0
Shakhtar Donetsk	Total		86	0	10	0	36	0	0	0	132	0
Career total			156	0	16	0	40	0	0	0	212	0

=== International ===
As of match played 17 November 2026

Appearances and goals by national team and year
National team	Year	Apps	Goals
Ukraine	2021	1	0
Ukraine	2022	1	0
Ukraine	2023	0	0
Ukraine	2024	0	0
Ukraine	2025	1	0
Ukraine	2026	4	0
Total		7	0

== Honours ==
Vorskla Poltava

- Ukrainian Cup runner-up: 2019–20

Shakhtar Donetsk

- Ukrainian Premier League: 2022–23, 2023–24, 2025–26
- Ukrainian Cup: 2023–24, 2024–25

Ukraine U20

- FIFA U-20 World Cup: 2019
