= David Puclin =

Brazilian footballer

Personal information
- Date of birth: 17 June 1992 (age 34)
- Place of birth: Čakovec, Croatia
- Height: 1.77 m (5 ft 9 1/2 in)
- Position: Defensive midfielder

Team information
- Current team: Varaždin
- Number: 6

Youth career
- 1997–1999: Sloboda Varaždin
- 1999–2011: Varteks Varaždin

Senior career*
Years	Team	Apps	(Gls)
2011–2012	Međimurje	27	(6)
2012	Gorica	1	(0)
2012–2014	Međimurje	47	(15)
2014–2015	Šibenik	24	(7)
2015–2016	FC Saarbrücken	27	(3)
2016–2018	Istra 1961	39	(2)
2018–2020	Slaven Belupo	56	(3)
2020–2023	Vorskla Poltava	47	(3)
2022	→ ADO Den Haag (loan)	3	(0)
2022	→ Varaždin (loan)	21	(1)
2023–2024	Nantong Zhiyun	41	(4)
2025	Kisvárda	8	(0)
2025–	Varaždin	22	(1)
- * Club domestic league appearances and goals as of 18 May 2025

David Puclin (born 17 June 1992) is a Croatian professional footballer who plays as a defensive midfielder for Varaždin.

== Club career ==
Born in Čakovec, Puclin started playing football at Sloboda Varaždin, before moving in 1999 to the Varteks Varaždin, where he would spend the following 12 years.

On 7 March 2022, FIFA announced that, due to the Russian invasion of Ukraine, all the contracts of foreign players in Ukraine are suspended until 30 June 2022 and they are allowed to sign with clubs outside Ukraine until that date. On 4 April 2022, Puclin signed with ADO Den Haag in the Netherlands under that rule until the end of the season.

On 30 June 2023, Puclin signed with Chinese Super League side Nantong Zhiyun.

== Career statistics ==
As of match played 27 April 2025.

Club	Season	League			Cup		Continental		Other		Total	
Club	Season	Division	Apps	Goals	Apps	Goals	Apps	Goals	Apps	Goals	Apps	Goals
Međimurje	2012–13	2. HNL	27	6	1	0	—		—		28	6
Gorica	2012–13	2. HNL	1	0	0	0	—		—		1	0
Međimurje	2012–13	3. HNL	22	8	1	0	—		—		23	8
Međimurje	2013–14	3. HNL	25	7	2	0	—		—		27	7
Međimurje	Total		47	15	3	0	—		—		50	15
Šibenik	2014–15	3. HNL	24	7	2	0	—		—		26	7
FC Saarbrücken	2015–16	Regionalliga Südwest	27	3	—		—		—		27	3
Istra 1961	2016–17	1. HNL	22	1	2	0	—		—		24	1
Istra 1961	2017–18	1. HNL	17	1	0	0	—		—		17	1
Istra 1961	Total		39	2	2	0	—		—		41	2
Slaven Belupo	2017–18	1. HNL	14	0	—		—		—		14	0
Slaven Belupo	2018–19	1. HNL	29	1	2	0	—		—		31	1
Slaven Belupo	2019–20	1. HNL	13	2	1	0	—		—		14	2
Slaven Belupo	Total		56	3	3	0	—		—		59	3
Vorskla Poltava	2019–20	Ukrainian Premier League	9	0	3	0	—		—		12	0
Vorskla Poltava	2020–21	Ukrainian Premier League	24	2	1	0	—		—		25	2
Vorskla Poltava	2021–22	Ukrainian Premier League	14	1	0	0	2	0	—		16	1
Vorskla Poltava	2022–23	Ukrainian Premier League	—		—		2	0	—		2	0
Vorskla Poltava	Total		47	3	4	0	4	0	—		55	3
ADO Den Haag (loan)	2021–22	Eerste Divisie	3	0	—		—		5	0	8	0
Varaždin (loan)	2022–23	1. HNL	21	1	1	0	—		—		22	1
Nantong Zhiyun	2023	Chinese Super League	16	3	1	0	—		—		17	3
Nantong Zhiyun	2024	Chinese Super League	25	1	0	0	—		—		25	1
Nantong Zhiyun	Total		41	4	1	0	—		—		42	4
Kisvárda	2024–25	NB II	8	0	2	0	—		—		10	0
Career total			341	44	19	0	4	0	5	0	369	44
