= Artem Chelyadin =

Ukrainian footballer (born 1999)

Personal information
- Full name: Artem Hennadiyovych Chelyadin
- Date of birth: 29 December 1999 (age 26)
- Place of birth: Novohrad-Volynskyi, Ukraine (now Zviahel)
- Height: 1.84 m (6 ft 0 in)
- Position: Midfielder

Team information
- Current team: Kolos Kovalivka
- Number: 8

Youth career
- 2007–2011: DYuSSh Novohrad-Volynskyi
- 2012–2017: Skala Stryi

Senior career*
Years	Team	Apps	(Gls)
2017–2018	Skala Stryi	13	(0)
2018–2025	Vorskla Poltava	123	(5)
2025–26	Kolos Kovalivka	4	(0)
2026 -	FC Livyi Bereh Kyiv	3	(0)
- * Club domestic league appearances and goals as of 3 June 2026

Artem Hennadiyovych Chelyadin (Ukrainian: Артем Геннадійович Челядін; born 29 December 1999) is a Ukrainian professional footballer who plays as a midfielder for Ukrainian Premier League club Kolos Kovalivka.

== Career ==
Chelyadin is a product of Youth Sportive School from his native Zviahel in Zhytomyr Oblast and Skala Stryi Sportive System. In January 2017 he was promoted to the Skala main squad to compete in the Ukrainian First League. He made his debut for Skala Stryi in a game against Cherkaskyi Dnipro on 18 March 2017 in the Ukrainian First League.
