= Ruslan Stepanyuk =

Ukrainian footballer (born 1992)

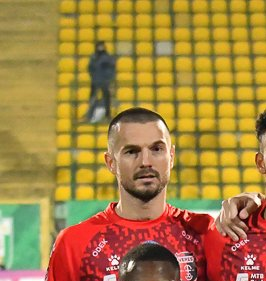

Personal information
- Full name: Ruslan Yuriyovych Stepanyuk
- Date of birth: 16 January 1992 (age 34)
- Place of birth: Vesele, Dnipropetrovsk Oblast, Ukraine
- Height: 1.82 m (6 ft 0 in)
- Position: Forward

Youth career
- 200?–2005: Kolos Nikopol
- 2005–2009: UFK Dnipropetrovsk

Senior career*
Years	Team	Apps	(Gls)
2009–2011	Kolos Nikopol	2	(0)
2011	Tavriya Simferopol	0	(0)
2012–2013	Stal Alchevsk	60	(16)
2014–2015	Hoverla Uzhhorod	16	(0)
2015	Oleksandriya	15	(1)
2016	Olimpik Donetsk	4	(0)
2016–2018	Veres Rivne	65	(26)
2018–2019	Zhetysu	44	(8)
2020–2024	Vorskla Poltava	106	(29)
2024–2025	Veres Rivne	28	(4)
- * Club domestic league appearances and goals as of 14 June 2025

Ruslan Yuriyovych Stepanyuk (Ukrainian: Руслан Юрійович Степанюк; born 16 January 1992) is a Ukrainian professional footballer who plays as a striker.

== Career ==
=== Early years ===
Stepanyuk is the product of the revived Kolos Nikopol (since 2001) and the School of Physical Culture (UFK) Dnipropetrovsk's Youth Systems, and his first trainer was Vitaliy Minyaylo.

=== Tavriya Simferopol ===
Stepanyuk's professional career continued when he was promoted to the youth team of Tavriya Simferopol.

=== Stal Alchevsk ===
In 2012, he made his debut for Stal Alchevsk in the Ukrainian First League.

=== Olimpik Donetsk ===
He played for Olimpik Donetsk in the Ukrainian Premier League.

=== Return to Veres Rivne ===
On 6 June 2024, Stepanyuk signed a three-year contract with Veres Rivne.

== Honours ==
=== Individual ===
- Ukrainian First League best player: 2016–17
- Ukrainian First League top scorer: 2016–17
- Ukrainian Premier League player of the Month: 2020–21 (September)
