= Ibrahim Kane =

Malian footballer

Personal information
- Date of birth: 23 June 2000 (age 26)
- Place of birth: Bamako, Mali
- Height: 1.75 m (5 ft 9 in)
- Position: Defender

Team information
- Current team: Kolos Kovalivka
- Number: 14

Youth career
- –2017: Black Stars

Senior career*
Years	Team	Apps	(Gls)
2017	Bakaridjan		
2018	Duguwolofila		
2018–2025	Vorskla Poltava	139	(13)
2022	→ Qingdao Hainiu (loan)	22	(5)
2025–	Kolos Kovalivka	27	(2)

International career^{‡}
2017	Mali U17	11	(1)
2019	Mali U23	2	(0)
2021–	Mali	2	(0)
- * Club domestic league appearances and goals as of 3 June 2026 ‡ National team caps and goals as of 17 June 2021

Ibrahim Kane (born 23 June 2000) is a Malian professional footballer who currently plays as a defender for Ukrainian club Kolos Kovalivka.

== International career ==
He made his debut for Mali national football team on 11 June 2021 in a friendly against DR Congo.

== Career statistics ==
=== Club ===
As of 4 June 2023.

Appearances and goals by club, season and competition
Club	Season	League			Cup		Continental		Other		Total	
Club	Season	Division	Apps	Goals	Apps	Goals	Apps	Goals	Apps	Goals	Apps	Goals
Vorskla Poltava	2018–19	Ukrainian Premier League	10	0	2 (Note: Appearances in the Ukrainian Cup)	0	2 (Note: Appearances in the UEFA Europa League)	0	—		14	0
Vorskla Poltava	2019–20	Ukrainian Premier League	19	1	3	1	—		—		22	2
Vorskla Poltava	2020–21	Ukrainian Premier League	23	4	1	0	—		—		24	4
Vorskla Poltava	2021–22	Ukrainian Premier League	17	2	1	1	2 (Note: Appearances in the UEFA Europa Conference League)	1	—		20	4
Vorskla Poltava	2022–23	Ukrainian Premier League	11	1	—		—		—		11	1
Vorskla Poltava	Total		80	8	7	2	4	1	—		91	11
Qingdao Hainiu (loan)	2022	China League One	22	5	1 (Note: Appearances in the Chinese FA Cup)	0	—		—		23	5
Career total			102	13	8	2	4	1	0	0	114	16
