= Volodymyr Chesnakov =

Ukrainian footballer

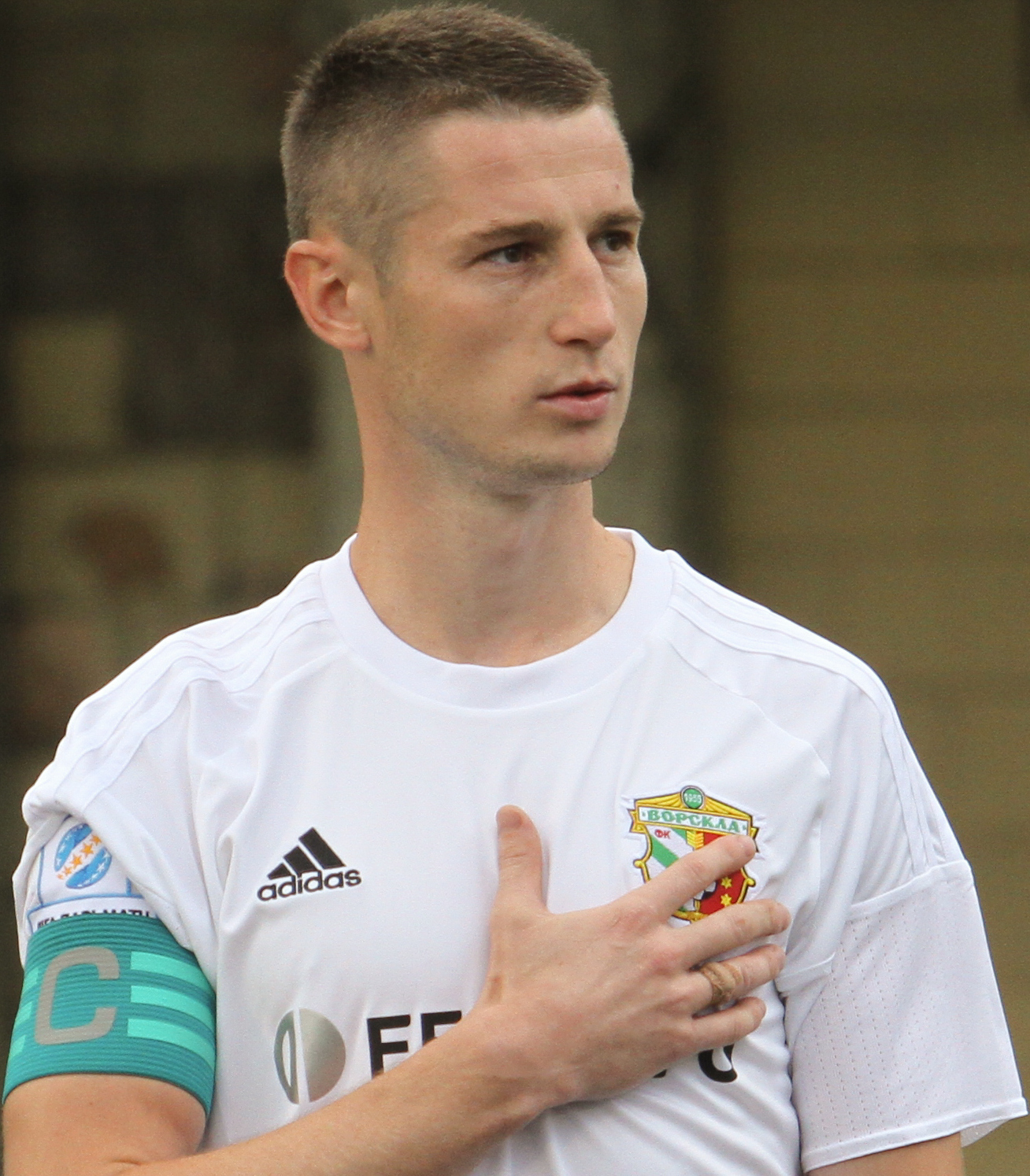
- Chesnakov in 2016

Personal information
- Full name: Volodymyr Hennadiyovych Chesnakov
- Date of birth: 12 February 1988 (age 38)
- Place of birth: Hlobyne, Soviet Union (now Ukraine)
- Height: 1.82 m (6 ft 0 in)
- Position: Centre-back

Youth career
- 2000–2001: Hlobyne
- 2002–2005: Molod Poltava

Senior career*
Years	Team	Apps	(Gls)
2006–2024	Vorskla Poltava	358	(15)

International career
2008–2011	Ukraine U21	25	(2)
- * Club domestic league appearances and goals

Volodymyr Hennadiyovych Chesnakov (Ukrainian: Володимир Геннадійович Чеснаков; born 12 February 1988) is a Ukrainian former professional footballer who played as a midfielder.

== Career statistics ==
=== Club ===
As of match played 11 December 2021

Appearances and goals by club, season and competition
Club	Season	League			Cup		Continental		Other		Total	
Club	Season	Division	Apps	Goals	Apps	Goals	Apps	Goals	Apps	Goals	Apps	Goals
Vorskla Poltava	2007–08	Ukrainian Premier League	2	0	4	0	0	0	0	0	6	0
Vorskla Poltava	2008–09	Ukrainian Premier League	14	0	5	0	0	0	0	0	19	0
Vorskla Poltava	2009–10	Ukrainian Premier League	28	2	1	0	1	0	1	0	31	2
Vorskla Poltava	2010–11	Ukrainian Premier League	22	1	1	1	0	0	0	0	23	2
Vorskla Poltava	2011–12	Ukrainian Premier League	24	0	1	0	12	0	0	0	37	0
Vorskla Poltava	2012–13	Ukrainian Premier League	27	1	2	0	0	0	0	0	29	1
Vorskla Poltava	2013–14	Ukrainian Premier League	28	3	2	0	0	0	0	0	30	3
Vorskla Poltava	2014–15	Ukrainian Premier League	23	0	5	0	0	0	0	0	28	0
Vorskla Poltava	2015–16	Ukrainian Premier League	20	1	5	0	1	0	0	0	26	1
Vorskla Poltava	2016–17	Ukrainian Premier League	28	1	2	0	2	1	0	0	32	2
Vorskla Poltava	2017–18	Ukrainian Premier League	29	2	2	0	0	0	0	0	31	2
Vorskla Poltava	2018–19	Ukrainian Premier League	25	1	1	0	6	1	0	0	32	2
Vorskla Poltava	2019–20	Ukrainian Premier League	25	0	4	0	0	0	0	0	29	0
Vorskla Poltava	2020–21	Ukrainian Premier League	23	0	1	0	0	0	0	0	24	0
Vorskla Poltava	2021–22	Ukrainian Premier League	15	1	0	0	2	0	0	0	17	1
Vorskla Poltava	Total		333	13	36	1	24	2	1	0	394	16
Career total			333	13	36	1	24	2	1	0	394	16
