= 2019–20 FC Vorskla Poltava season =

Vorskla Poltava
2019–20 season
- Chairman: Roman Cherniak
- Manager: Vitaliy Kosovskyi (until 14 November 2019); Yuriy Maksymov (since 15 November 2019)
- Stadium: Oleksiy Butovskyi Vorskla Stadium
- Ukrainian Premier League: 10th
- Ukrainian Cup: Final
- Top goalscorer: League: Ruslan Stepanyuk, Denys Vasin (4); All: Ruslan Stepanyuk, Denys Vasin (5)
- Highest home attendance: 11,399 (vs Dynamo Kyiv, 22 September 2019)
- Lowest home attendance: 0 (all home matches were played behind closed doors starting 31 May 2020)
- Average home league attendance: 2,879
| Home colours | Away colours |

The 2019–20 season was the 24th consecutive season in the top Ukrainian football league for Vorskla Poltava. Vorskla competed in Premier League and Ukrainian Cup.

== Players ==
=== Squad information ===
As of 19 July 2020

| Squad no. | Name | Nationality | Position | Date of birth (age) |
Goalkeepers
| 12 | Danylo Kanevtsev | (Ukraine) | GK | 26 July 1996 (aged 23) |
| 21 | Oleksandr Tkachenko | (Ukraine) | GK | 19 February 1993 (aged 27) |
| 31 | Dmytro Riznyk ^{List B} | (Ukraine) | GK | 30 January 1999 (aged 21) |
| 51 | Pavlo Isenko ^{List B} | (Ukraine) | GK | 21 July 2003 (aged 16) |
Defenders
| 3 | Juanma García | (Spain) | DF | 18 January 1997 (aged 23) |
| 5 | Najeeb Yakubu ^{List B} | (Ghana) | DF | 1 May 2000 (aged 20) |
| 17 | Volodymyr Chesnakov (Captain) | (Ukraine) | DF | 12 February 1988 (aged 32) |
| 23 | Vadym Sapay | (Ukraine) | DF | 7 February 1986 (aged 34) |
| 25 | Yevhen Martynenko | (Ukraine) | DF | 25 June 1993 (aged 27) |
| 27 | Volodymyr Bayenko | (Ukraine) | DF | 9 February 1990 (aged 30) |
| 36 | Bohdan Chuyev ^{List B} | (Ukraine) | DF | 23 February 2000 (aged 20) |
| 37 | Valeriy Dubko ^{List B} | (Ukraine) | DF | 22 March 2001 (aged 19) |
| 39 | Yevhen Opanasenko | (Ukraine) | DF | 25 August 1990 (aged 29) |
| 43 | Taras Dmytruk ^{List B} | (Ukraine) | DF | 9 March 2000 (aged 20) |
| 45 | Maksym Melnychuk ^{List B} | (Ukraine) | DF | 11 January 2000 (aged 20) |
| 48 | Denys Taraduda ^{List B} | (Ukraine) | DF | 17 August 2000 (aged 19) |
| 50 | Ibrahim Kane ^{List B} | (Mali) | DF | 23 June 2000 (aged 20) |
Midfielders
| 4 | Ihor Perduta | (Ukraine) | MF | 15 November 1990 (aged 29) |
| 6 | Oleksandr Sklyar | (Ukraine) | MF | 26 February 1991 (aged 29) |
| 8 | Artem Habelok | (Ukraine) | MF | 1 February 1995 (aged 25) |
| 13 | Oleh Vlasov ^{List B} | (Ukraine) | MF | 25 October 2002 (aged 17) |
| 15 | Artem Kulakovskyi ^{List B} | (Ukraine) | MF | 11 February 2000 (aged 20) |
| 19 | Yan Kostenko ^{List B} | (Ukraine) | MF | 4 July 2003 (aged 17) |
| 24 | Radion Posyevkin ^{List B} | (Ukraine) | MF | 18 May 2001 (aged 19) |
| 28 | David Puclin | (Croatia) | MF | 17 June 1992 (aged 28) |
| 38 | Artem Chelyadin ^{List B} | (Ukraine) | MF | 29 December 1999 (aged 20) |
| 42 | Illya Hadzhuk ^{List B} | (Ukraine) | MF | 2 August 2002 (aged 17) |
| 47 | Artem Bilyi ^{List B} | (Ukraine) | MF | 3 October 1999 (aged 20) |
| 49 | Danylo Buhayenko ^{List B} | (Ukraine) | MF | 4 October 2002 (aged 17) |
| 52 | Daniil Syemilyet ^{List B} | (Ukraine) | MF | 7 March 2001 (aged 19) |
| 82 | Pavlo Rebenok | (Ukraine) | MF | 23 July 1985 (aged 34) |
| 92 | Pape-Alioune Ndiaye ^{List B} | (France) | MF | 4 February 1998 (aged 22) |
Forwards
| 10 | Vladyslav Kulach | (Ukraine) | FW | 7 May 1993 (aged 27) |
| 11 | Ruslan Stepanyuk | (Ukraine) | FW | 16 January 1992 (aged 28) |
| 14 | Danylo Kravchuk ^{List B} | (Ukraine) | FW | 2 July 2001 (aged 19) |
| 16 | Yuriy Kozyrenko ^{List B} | (Ukraine) | FW | 27 November 1999 (aged 20) |
| 35 | Denys Halata ^{List B} | (Ukraine) | FW | 4 September 2000 (aged 19) |
| 77 | Denys Vasin | (Ukraine) | FW | 4 March 1989 (aged 31) |
| 99 | Dmytro Shcherbak | (Ukraine) | FW | 8 December 1996 (aged 23) |

== Transfers ==
=== In ===
| Date | Pos. | Player | Age | Moving from | Type | Fee | Source |
Summer
| 26 July 2019 | FW | (Ukraine) Andriy Stryzhak | 19 | (Ukraine) Arsenal Kyiv | Transfer | Undisclosed | |
| 9 August 2019 | DF | (Ukraine) Zurab Ochihava | 24 | (Ukraine) Dynamo Kyiv | Transfer | Undisclosed | |
| 12 August 2019 | FW | (Albania) Rubin Hebaj | 21 | (Slovenia) Domžale | Transfer | Undisclosed | |
| 14 August 2019 | DF | (Ukraine) Volodymyr Bayenko | 29 | (Uzbekistan) Buxoro | Transfer | Undisclosed | |
| 2 September 2019 | MF | (Tanzania) Yohana Oscar Mkomola | 19 | (Tanzania) Young Africans | Transfer | Undisclosed | |
| 2 September 2019 | MF | (France) Pape-Alioune Ndiaye | 21 | (Spain) Lorca Deportiva | Transfer | Undisclosed | |
| 5 September 2019 | DF | (Spain) Juanma García | 22 | (England) Liverpool | Transfer | Free | |
| 30 June 2019 | GK | (Ukraine) Danylo Kanevtsev | 22 | (Ukraine) Metalist 1925 Kharkiv | Loan return | | |
| 30 June 2019 | DF | (Ukraine) Ihor Honchar | 26 | (Ukraine) Hirnyk-Sport | Loan return | | |
| 30 June 2019 | FW | (Ukraine) Volodymyr Odaryuk | 25 | (Ukraine) Hirnyk-Sport | Loan return | | |
| 6 August 2019 | MF | (Brazil) Luizão | 21 | (Portugal) Porto B | Loan | | |
Winter
| 9 January 2020 | FW | (Ukraine) Ruslan Stepanyuk | 27 | (Kazakhstan) Zhetysu | Transfer | Undisclosed | |
| 20 January 2020 | FW | (Ukraine) Vladyslav Kulach | 26 | (Ukraine) Shakhtar Donetsk | Transfer | Undisclosed | |
| 30 January 2020 | DF | (Ukraine) Yevhen Opanasenko | 29 | (Turkey) Konyaspor | Transfer | Free | |
| 1 February 2020 | DF | (Ukraine) Dmytro Shcherbak | 23 | Unattached | Transfer | Free | |
| 13 February 2020 | MF | (Croatia) David Puclin | 27 | Unattached | Transfer | Free | |
| 15 February 2020 | MF | (Ukraine) Artem Kulakovskyi | 20 | (Ukraine) Dynamo Kyiv | Transfer | Undisclosed | |
| 19 February 2020 | DF | (Ukraine) Taras Dmytruk | 19 | (Ukraine) Dynamo Kyiv | Transfer | Undisclosed | |
| 1 January 2020 | DF | (Ukraine) Myroslav Mazur | 21 | (Moldova) Sfântul Gheorghe Suruceni | Loan return | | |
| 1 January 2020 | FW | (Ukraine) Volodymyr Odaryuk | 25 | (Ukraine) Hirnyk-Sport Horishni Plavni | Loan return | | |
| 28 February 2020 | MF | (Ukraine) Klim Prykhodko | 20 | (Ukraine) Shakhtar DonetsK | Loan | | |

=== Out ===
| Date | Pos. | Player | Age | Moving to | Type | Fee | Source |
Summer
| 1 June 2019 | FW | (Ukraine) Dmytro Shapoval | 23 | Unattached | Transfer | Free | |
| 2 June 2019 | GK | (Ukraine) Bohdan Shust | 33 | (Ukraine) Inhulets Petrove | Transfer | Undisclosed | |
| 25 June 2019 | DF | (Ukraine) Oleksandr Chyzhov | 32 | Retired | Transfer | Free | |
| 25 June 2019 | MF | (Georgia (country)) Aleksandre Kobakhidze | 32 | (Ukraine) SC Dnipro-1 | Transfer | Undisclosed | |
| 8 July 2019 | MF | (Ukraine) Vyacheslav Sharpar | 32 | (Latvia) Riga | Transfer | Undisclosed | |
| 24 July 2019 | MF | (Ukraine) Maryan Mysyk | 22 | (Ukraine) Rukh Lviv | Transfer | Undisclosed | |
| 24 July 2019 | FW | (Ukraine) Volodymyr Odaryuk | 25 | (Ukraine) Hirnyk-Sport Horishni Plavni | Transfer | Undisclosed | |
| 13 August 2019 | DF | (Ukraine) Ihor Honchar | 26 | (Ukraine) FC Lviv | Transfer | Undisclosed | |
| 5 September 2019 | DF | (Georgia (country)) Andro Giorgadze | 23 | (Czech Republic) Fastav Zlín | Transfer | Undisclosed | |
| 24 October 2019 | DF | (Kosovo) Ardin Dallku | 24 | (North Macedonia) Shkëndija | Transfer | Free | |
| 30 June 2019 | FW | (Brazil) Nicolas Careca | 22 | (Brazil) Grêmio | Loan return | | |
Winter
| January 2020 | FW | (Albania) Rubin Hebaj | 21 | (Albania) KF Teuta Durrës | Transfer | Free | |
| 14 January 2020 | DF | (Ukraine) Zurab Ochihava | 24 | (Estonia) Levadia Tallinn | Transfer | Free | |
| 24 January 2020 | DF | (Ukraine) Taras Sakiv | 22 | (Ukraine) Rukh Lviv | Transfer | Undisclosed | |
| 8 February 2020 | FW | (Ukraine) Yuriy Kolomoyets | 29 | (Estonia) Levadia Tallinn | Transfer | Free | |
| 20 February 2020 | DF | (Ukraine) Myroslav Mazur | 21 | (Sweden) Umeå FC | Transfer | Undisclosed | |
| 28 February 2020 | MF | (Ukraine) Dmytro Kravchenko | 25 | Unattached | Transfer | Free | |
| 2 March 2020 | MF | (Serbia) Todor Petrović | 25 | (Croatia) Inter Zaprešić | Transfer | Free | |
| 29 June 2020 | MF | (Tanzania) Yohana Oscar Mkomola | 20 | (Ukraine) Inhulets Petrove | Transfer | Undisclosed | |
| 30 June 2020 | DF | (Brazil) Artur | 25 | Unattached | Transfer | Free | |
| 10 July 2020 | FW | (Ukraine) Andriy Stryzhak | 20 | (Ukraine) Chornomorets Odesa | Transfer | Undisclosed | |
| 19 July 2020 | FW | (Bosnia and Herzegovina) Edin Šehić | 25 | Unattached | Transfer | Free | |
| 30 June 2020 | MF | (Ukraine) Klim Prykhodko | 20 | (Ukraine) Shakhtar DonetsK | Loan return | | |
| 16 July 2020 | MF | (Brazil) Luizão | 22 | (Portugal) FC Porto | Loan return | | |

== Pre-season and friendlies ==
| 30 June 2019 Friendly | Vorskla Poltava (Ukraine) | 3–2 | (Azerbaijan) Neftçi Baku | Turkey |
| 14:00 EEST (UTC+03:00) | Rebenok 8'; Martynenko 71'; Kravchenko 90+2' (pen.) | Report | Platellas 28'; Dário 33' | Stadium: Fenerbahçe Topuk Yaylası Resort & Sport Tesisleri Resmi Sitesi |

| 2 July 2019 Friendly | Vorskla Poltava (Ukraine) | 1–0 | (Romania) Politehnica Iași | Turkey |
| 17:00 EEST (UTC+03:00) | Chelyadin 22' | Report | | Stadium: Fenerbahçe Topuk Yaylası Resort & Sport Tesisleri Resmi Sitesi |

| 6 July 2019 Friendly | Vorskla Poltava (Ukraine) | 0–2 | (Belgium) Westerlo | Bolu, Turkey |
| 18:00 EEST (UTC+03:00) | | Report | Vetokele 80' (pen.), 89' |

| 11 July 2019 Friendly | Vorskla Poltava (Ukraine) | 3–1 | (Azerbaijan) Gabala | Turkey |
| EEST (UTC+03:00) | Petrović 44'; Kolomoyets 55', 81' | Report | Goal |

| 17 July 2019 Friendly | Vorskla Poltava (Ukraine) | 2–3 | (Ukraine) Inhulets Pertove | Poltava |
| 17:00 EEST (UTC+03:00) | Vasin 72' (pen.), 79' (pen.) | Report | Kovalenko 10', 41'; Klymenko 29' | Stadium: Ltava Stadium |

| 21 July 2019 Friendly | Vorskla Poltava (Ukraine) | 3–4 | (Ukraine) SC Dnipro-1 | Poltava |
| 18:00 EEST (UTC+03:00) | Chesnakov 60'; Vasin 88', 89' (pen.) | Report | Supriaha 30', 40', 61'; Buletsa 50' | Stadium: Vorskla Stadium; Attendance: 1,200 |

| 14 October 2019 Friendly | Vorskla Poltava (Ukraine) | 3–1 | (Ukraine) FC Vovchansk | Poltava |
| 13:00 EEST (UTC+03:00) | Chesnakov 43'; Bayenko 66'; Sklyar 82' | Report | Goal | Stadium: Ltava Stadium |

| 25 January 2020 Friendly | Vorskla Poltava (Ukraine) | 3–3 | (Poland) ŁKS Łódź | Turkey |
| 14:30 EET (UTC+02:00) | Luizão 62'; Artur 70'; Shcherbak 83' | Report | Ratajczyk 24'; Dąbrowski 36'; Pirulo 45' |

| 27 January 2020 Friendly | Vorskla Poltava (Ukraine) | 1–1 | (Serbia) Radnik Surdulica | Belek, Turkey |
| 15:00 EET (UTC+02:00) | Shcherbak 70' | Report | 25' |

| 30 January 2020 Friendly | Vorskla Poltava (Ukraine) | 1–1 | (Kosovo) Drita | Turkey |
| 15:00 EET (UTC+02:00) | Kulach 76' | Report | Shabani 59' |

| 2 February 2020 Friendly | Vorskla Poltava (Ukraine) | 0–1 | (Serbia) Spartak Subotica | Antalya, Turkey |
| 16:00 EET (UTC+02:00) | | Report | Tufegdžić 3' | Stadium: Fanatik tour |

| 10 February 2020 Friendly | Vorskla Poltava (Ukraine) | 2–1 | (Uzbekistan) Nasaf Qarshi | Turkey |
| 15:00 EET (UTC+02:00) | Puclin 14'; Shcherbak 20' | Report | Hasanov 28' |

| 13 February 2020 Friendly | Vorskla Poltava (Ukraine) | 0–0 | (Poland) Termalica Nieciecza | Turkey |
| 15:00 EET (UTC+02:00) | | Report |

| 16 February 2020 Friendly | Vorskla Poltava (Ukraine) | 0–2 | (Kazakhstan) Ordabasy | Turkey |
| 16:00 EET (UTC+02:00) | | Report | João Paulo 7'; Simčević 84' |

| 22 May 2020 Friendly | FC Oleksandriya (Ukraine) | 4–2 | (Ukraine) Vorskla Poltava | Oleksandriya |
| 14:00 EEST (UTC+03:00) | Bukhal 20', 30'; Ustymenko 83', 88' | Report | Rebenok 17'; Opanasenko 81' | Stadium: CSC Nika Stadium; Referee: Viktor Kopiyevskyi |

== Competitions ==
=== Overall ===
| Competition | First match | Last match | Starting round | Final position | Record | | | | | | | |
| Competition | First match | Last match | Starting round | Final position | Pld | W | D | L | GF | GA | GD | Win % |
|---|---|---|---|---|---|---|---|---|---|---|---|---|
| Premier League | 28 July 2019 | 19 July 2020 | Matchday 1 | 10th | 32 | 9 | 7 | 16 | 23 | 48 | −25 | 28.13 |
| Cup | 30 October 2019 | 8 July 2020 | Round of 16 (1/8) | Final | 4 | 2 | 2 | 0 | 4 | 2 | +2 | 50.00 |
| Total | | | | | 36 | 11 | 9 | 16 | 27 | 50 | −23 | 30.56 |

Last updated: 19 July 2020
Source: Competitions

=== Premier League ===
==== League table ====
| Pos | Team | Pld | W | D | L | GF | GA | GD | Pts | Qualification or relegation |
|---|---|---|---|---|---|---|---|---|---|---|
| 8 | FC Mariupol | 32 | 12 | 9 | 11 | 40 | 46 | −6 | 45 | Qualification for the playoff for Europa League second qualifying round |
| 9 | Olimpik Donetsk | 32 | 10 | 6 | 16 | 32 | 47 | −15 | 36 | |
| 10 | Vorskla Poltava | 32 | 9 | 7 | 16 | 23 | 48 | −25 | 34 | |
| 11 | FC Lviv | 32 | 5 | 9 | 18 | 25 | 57 | −32 | 24 | |
| 12 | Karpaty Lviv (Note: Karpaty Lviv was expelled from the league for failing to appear to two games.) | 32 | 2 | 9 | 21 | 19 | 48 | −29 | 15 | Expelled from the league |

Source: Ukrainian Premier League, UEFA, Soccerway
Rules for classification: 1) Points; 2) Head-to-head points; 3) Head-to-head goal difference; 4) Head-to-head higher number of goals scored; 5) Goal difference; 6) Higher number of goals scored; 7) Draw or "golden match" if tied for title (Article 22, paragraph 3).

==== Results summary ====
| Overall | | | | | | | | Home | | | | | | Away | | | | | |
| Pld | W | D | L | GF | GA | GD | Pts | W | D | L | GF | GA | GD | W | D | L | GF | GA | GD |
|---|---|---|---|---|---|---|---|---|---|---|---|---|---|---|---|---|---|---|---|
| 32 | 9 | 7 | 16 | 23 | 48 | −25 | 34 | 7 | 4 | 5 | 14 | 16 | −2 | 2 | 3 | 11 | 9 | 32 | −23 |

Last updated: 19 July 2020.
Source: Competitive matches

==== Results by round ====
| Round | 1 | 2 | 3 | 4 | 5 | 6 | 7 | 8 | 9 | 10 | 11 | 12 | 13 | 14 | 15 | 16 | 17 | 18 | 19 | 20 | 21 | 22 | 23 | 24 | 25 | 26 | 27 | 28 | 29 | 30 | 31 | 32 |
|---|---|---|---|---|---|---|---|---|---|---|---|---|---|---|---|---|---|---|---|---|---|---|---|---|---|---|---|---|---|---|---|---|
| Ground | H | A | H | H | A | H | A | H | A | H | A | A | H | A | A | H | A | H | A | H | A | H | A | H | H | A | H | H | A | A | H | A |
| Result | L | L | W | D | W | L | L | L | L | D | L | L | L | L | L | W | L | W | L | W | L | W | D | D | W | D | W | D | D | W | L | L |
| Position | 9 | 10 | 8 | 10 | 4 | 7 | 10 | 10 | 10 | 10 | 11 | 11 | 11 | 12 | 12 | 12 | 12 | 11 | 11 | 11 | 11 | 10 | 10 | 10 | 10 | 9 | 9 | 9 | 9 | 9 | 9 | 10 |

Updated to match(es) played on 19 July 2020. Source: Competitive matches
A = Away; H = Home; W = Win; D = Draw; L = Loss

==== Matches ====
| 28 July 2019 1 | Vorskla Poltava | 0–1 | Zorya Luhansk | Poltava |
| 14:00 EEST (UTC+03:00) | Habelok (yellow card) 13'; Kolomoyets (yellow card) 55'; Šehić (yellow card) 88' | Report | Lyednyev 3', (yellow card) 67'; Mykhaylychenko (yellow card) 6'; Budkivskyi (yellow card) 10'; Vernydub (yellow card) 14'; Khomchenovskyi (yellow card) 49' | Stadium: Vorskla Stadium; Attendance: 2,647; Referee: Dmytro Kutakov |

| 3 August 2019 2 | Desna Chernihiv | 2–0 | Vorskla Poltava | Chernihiv |
| 19:30 EEST (UTC+03:00) | Kalitvintsev 19'; Mostovyi (yellow card) 22'; Ohirya (yellow card) 53'; Filippov 79'; Past (yellow card) 85' | Report | Šehić (yellow card) 31'; Perduta (yellow card) 39'; Vasin (yellow card) 90+2'; Martynenko (yellow card) 90+4' | Stadium: Chernihiv Stadium; Attendance: 3,288; Referee: Yuriy Ivanov |

| 10 August 2019 3 | Vorskla Poltava | 3–2 | FC Lviv | Poltava |
| 19:30 EEST (UTC+03:00) | Šehić 2', 27'; Luizão (yellow card) 14'; Kolomoyets (yellow card) 28'; Perduta (yellow card) 44'; Sklyar (yellow card) 82'; Kane (yellow card) 90'; Vasin (yellow card) 90+3', (goal) 90+5' (pen.) | Report | Bruno Duarte 20'; Kvasnyi (yellow card) 49'; China 58', (yellow card) 59'; Borzenko (yellow card) 78' | Stadium: Vorskla Stadium; Attendance: 2,149; Referee: Serhiy Boyko |

| 17 August 2019 4 | Vorskla Poltava | 1–1 | SC Dnipro-1 | Poltava |
| 14:00 EEST (UTC+03:00) | Šehić (yellow card) 7'; Perduta (yellow card) 28'; Kolomoyets 54'; Chesnakov (yellow card) 73'; Habelok (yellow card) 78'; Stryzhak (yellow card) 90+2' | Report | Korkishko (yellow card) 26'; Kohut (yellow card) 34'; Chychykov 50'; Kravchenko (red card) 90' | Stadium: Vorskla Stadium; Attendance: 2,307; Referee: Yevhen Aranovskyi |

| 24 August 2019 5 | Kolos Kovalivka | 0–3 | Vorskla Poltava | Kyiv |
| 14:00 EEST (UTC+03:00) | Nekhtiy (yellow card) 7'; Zozulya (yellow card) 35'; Smyrnyi (yellow card) 41' | Report | Perduta 4', 54'; Artur (yellow card) 70'; Kolomoyets 73' | Stadium: Obolon Arena; Attendance: 2,002; Referee: Kateryna Monzul |

| 31 August 2019 6 | Vorskla Poltava | 0–1 | FC Oleksandriya | Poltava |
| 17:00 EEST (UTC+03:00) | Bayenko (yellow card) 24'; Petrović (yellow card) 54'; Luizão (yellow card) 74' | Report | Shastal 23'; Pashayev (yellow card) 34'; Dubra (yellow card) 47'; Dovhyi (yellow card) 90+2'; Bukhal (yellow card) 90+3' | Stadium: Vorskla Stadium; Attendance: 6,075; Referee: Yaroslav Kozyk |

| 14 September 2019 7 | Karpaty Lviv | 2–1 | Vorskla Poltava | Lviv |
| 17:00 EEST (UTC+03:00) | Di Franco (yellow card) 38'; Klyots (yellow card) 45+1'; Ponde 69' (pen.) da Graça 80' | Report | Kolomoyets (yellow card) 18'; Bayenko 41'; Vasin (yellow card) 53'; Chesnakov (yellow card) 68'; Sapay (yellow card) 81' | Stadium: Ukraina Stadium; Attendance: 2,950; Referee: Ihor Paskhal |

| 22 September 2019 8 | Vorskla Poltava | 0–5 | Dynamo Kyiv | Poltava |
| 17:00 EEST (UTC+03:00) | Luizão (yellow card) 19'; Sklyar (yellow card) 40' | Report | Tsyhankov 9'; Besyedin (yellow card) 20', (goal) 46'; Shabanov 35' de Pena 37', 83'; Mykolenko (yellow card) 58'; Harmash (yellow card) 73' | Stadium: Vorskla Stadium; Attendance: 11,399; Referee: Yuriy Mozharovskyi |

| 27 September 2019 9 | Shakhtar Donetsk | 4–0 | Vorskla Poltava | Kharkiv |
| 19:00 EEST (UTC+03:00) | Bondar 32'; Konoplyanka 50' (pen.); Alan Patrick 72'; Moraes 77' | Report | Artur (yellow card) 5'; Bayenko (yellow card) 55' | Stadium: OSC Metalist; Attendance: 4,638; Referee: Yevhen Aranovskyi |

| 5 October 2019 10 | Vorskla Poltava | 1–1 | FC Mariupol | Poltava |
| 14:00 EEST (UTC+03:00) | Petrović (yellow card) 24'; Sapay (yellow card) 37'; Perduta (yellow card) 64'; Vasin 90+2' | Report | Vakula (yellow card) 10'; Yavorskyi (yellow card) 30'; Tankovskyi (yellow card) 45+1'; Fedorchuk (yellow card) 53'; Bykov (yellow card) 55'; Chobotenko 57' | Stadium: Vorskla Stadium; Attendance: 2,100; Referee: Maksym Kozyryatskyi |

| 20 October 2019 11 | Olimpik Donetsk | 2–0 | Vorskla Poltava | Kyiv |
| 19:30 EEST (UTC+03:00) | Do Couto 67'; Lukyanchuk 75'; Zahedi (yellow card) 89' | Report | Sapay (yellow card) 22'; Chelyadin (yellow card) 71' | Stadium: Dynamo Stadium; Attendance: 329; Referee: Oleksandr Derdo |

| 26 October 2019 12 | Zorya Luhansk | 4–0 | Vorskla Poltava | Zaporizhia |
| 17:00 EEST (UTC+03:00) | Rusyn 16'; Yurchenko 45+1'; Kabayev 61'; Lyednyev 77', (yellow card) 85' | Report | Bayenko (yellow card) 29' (yellow-red card) 55'; Melnychuk (yellow card) 44'; Vasin (yellow card) 45+1' | Stadium: Slavutych-Arena; Attendance: 2,687; Referee: Denys Shurman |

| 2 November 2019 13 | Vorskla Poltava | 0–1 | Desna Chernihiv | Poltava |
| 14:00 EET (UTC+02:00) | Petrović (yellow card) 41'; Chesnakov (yellow card) 63' | Report | Dehtyarov (yellow card) 68'; Imerekov 76' | Stadium: Vorskla Stadium; Attendance: 2,005; Referee: Dmytro Kutakov |

| 9 November 2019 14 | FC Lviv | 2–0 | Vorskla Poltava | Lviv |
| 17:00 EET (UTC+02:00) | Renan 13'; Pedro Vitor 41' (pen.) | Report | Luizão (yellow card) 14' (yellow-red card) 35'; Bayenko (yellow card) 24'; Sklyar (yellow card) 45'; Chesnakov (yellow card) 50'; Kravchenko (yellow card) 67'; Martynenko (yellow card) 72' (yellow-red card) 80' | Stadium: Ukraina Stadium; Attendance: 540; Referee: Maksym Kozyryatskyi |

| 23 November 2019 15 | SC Dnipro-1 | 1–0 | Vorskla Poltava | Dnipro |
| 17:00 EET (UTC+02:00) | Kravchenko (yellow card) 45+1'; Korkishko 80' (pen.); Buletsa (yellow card) 90+4'; Lopyryonok (yellow card) 90+6' | Report | Vasin (yellow card) 58'; Rebenok (yellow card) 90+2' | Stadium: Dnipro-Arena; Attendance: 1,941; Referee: Yuriy Ivanov |

| 30 November 2019 16 | Vorskla Poltava | 1–0 | Kolos Kovalivka | Poltava |
| 17:00 EET (UTC+02:00) | Artur (yellow card) 1'; Vasin 38' (pen.); Ndiaye (yellow card) 90+3' | Report | Zadoya (yellow card) 30'; Lysenko (yellow card) 90+3' | Stadium: Vorskla Stadium; Attendance: 1,156; Referee: Kostiantyn Trukhanov |

| 7 December 2019 17 | FC Oleksandriya | 3–0 | Vorskla Poltava | Oleksandriya |
| 14:00 EET (UTC+02:00) | Pashayev (yellow card) 17'; Luchkevych (yellow card) 54'; Zaporozhan 59' (pen.); Kovalets 75', 85' | Report | Vasin (yellow card) 48'; Kolomoyets (yellow card) 62'; Artur (yellow card) 67'; Ndiaye (yellow card) 84'; Ochigava (yellow card) 89' | Stadium: CSC Nika Stadium; Attendance: 911; Referee: Yuriy Mozharovskyi |

| 15 December 2019 18 | Vorskla Poltava | 2–1 | Karpaty Lviv | Poltava |
| 14:00 EET (UTC+02:00) | Luizão (yellow card) 20', (goal) 30'; Vasin 42' (pen.); Perduta (yellow card) 51'; Sklyar (yellow card) 74' | Report | Boiciuc 39'; Mohamed (yellow card) 50'; Hall (yellow card) 53'; Yakimets (yellow card) 66'; Kucher (yellow card) 69'; Nazaryna (yellow card) 71' | Stadium: Vorskla Stadium; Attendance: 1,117; Referee: Oleksandr Derdo |

| 22 February 2020 19 | Dynamo Kyiv | 2–1 | Vorskla Poltava | Kyiv |
| 17:00 EET (UTC+02:00) | Buyalskyi 50'; Verbič 90+1' | Report | Kane (yellow card) 32'; Šehić (yellow card) 52'; Kulach (yellow card) 57'; Stepanyuk 63' | Stadium: NSC Olimpiyskiy; Attendance: 0 Referee: Vitaliy Romanov |

| 1 March 2020 20 | Vorskla Poltava | 1–0 | Shakhtar Donetsk | Poltava |
| 17:00 EET (UTC+02:00) | Stepanyuk 30', (yellow card) 59'; Sklyar (yellow card) 55' (yellow-red card) 84'; Perduta (yellow card) 63'; Puclin (yellow card) 73'; Yakubu (yellow card) 78'; Luizão (yellow card) 88'; Kane (yellow card) 90' | Report | Tetê (yellow card) 36'; Kryvtsov (yellow card) 50'; Cipriano (yellow card) 51'; Marlos (yellow card) 86'; Dodô (yellow card) 90'; Dentinho (yellow card) 90+1' | Stadium: Vorskla Stadium; Attendance: 8,776; Referee: Ihor Paskhal |

| 4 March 2020 21 | FC Mariupol | 3–0 | Vorskla Poltava | Mariupol |
| 14:00 EET (UTC+02:00) | Myshnyov 32' (pen.), (yellow card) 35'; Topalov 47'; Muravskyi (yellow card) 77' (yellow-red card) 90+3'; Chobotenko 80'; Ihnatenko (yellow card) 84' | Report | Ndiaye (yellow card) 54'; Vasin (yellow card) 70'; Kane (yellow card) 76' | Stadium: Volodymyr Boiko Stadium; Attendance: 689; Referee: Oleksandr Derdo |

| 7 March 2020 22 | Vorskla Poltava | 1–0 | Olimpik Donetsk | Poltava |
| 14:00 EET (UTC+02:00) | Chesnakov (yellow card) 34'; Šehić (yellow card) 47'; Kulach (yellow card) 58', (goal) 63' (pen.) | Report | Ksyonz (yellow card) 23'; Zotko (yellow card) 26'; Zahedi (yellow card) 28'; Kravchuk (yellow card) 38' (yellow-red card) 78'; Dehtyarov (yellow card) 43'; Hryshko (yellow card) 62'; Balanyuk (yellow card) 90+3' | Stadium: Vorskla Stadium; Attendance: 3,463; Referee: Dmytro Kutakov |

| 15 March 2020 23 | Olimpik Donetsk | 1–1 | Vorskla Poltava | Kyiv |
| 19:30 EET (UTC+02:00) | Balanyuk 21'; Kychak (yellow card) 22' | Report | Yakubu (yellow card) 9'; Kulach 42'; Sklyar (yellow card) 70' | Stadium: Dynamo Stadium; Attendance: 0 Referee: Yaroslav Kozyk |
Note: Match was played behind closed doors due to quarantine in Ukraine during COVID-19 pandemic.

| 31 May 2020 24 | Vorskla Poltava | 1–1 | FC Lviv | Poltava |
| 14:00 EET (UTC+02:00) | Kane 13'; Sklyar (yellow card) 14' | Report | China (yellow card) 28', (goal) 90+4' (pen.); Alvaro (yellow card) 72'; Baiano (yellow card) 87' | Stadium: Vorskla Stadium; Attendance: 0 Referee: Maksym Kozyryatskyi |
Note: Match was played behind closed doors due to quarantine in Ukraine during COVID-19 pandemic.

| 6 June 2020 25 | Vorskla Poltava | + – - | Karpaty Lviv | Poltava |
| EEST (UTC+03:00) | | Report | | Stadium: Vorskla Stadium |
Note: Technical victory

| 13 June 2020 26 | FC Mariupol | 1–1 | Vorskla Poltava | Mariupol |
| 14:00 EEST (UTC+03:00) | Bykov (yellow card) 14'; Ihnatenko (yellow card) 23'; Topalov 74' | Report | Puclin (yellow card) 27'; Yakubu 59'; Sapay (yellow card) 90+4'; Perduta (red card) 90+5' | Stadium: Volodymyr Boiko Stadium; Attendance: 0 Referee: Dmytro Kutakov |
Note: Match was played behind closed doors due to quarantine in Ukraine during COVID-19 pandemic.

| 19 June 2020 27 | Vorskla Poltava | 2–0 | SC Dnipro-1 | Poltava |
| 19:00 EEST (UTC+03:00) | Chesnakov (yellow card) 8'; Stepanyuk 18', 48'; Rebenok (yellow card) 29'; Kulach (yellow card) 39'; Sklyar (yellow card) 69'; Bayenko (yellow card) 76' | Report | Khoblenko (yellow card) 25'; Kohut (yellow card) 26'; Di Franco (yellow card) 43'; Lopyryonok (yellow card) 55'; Tsurikov (yellow card) 57'; Korkishko (yellow card) 77' | Stadium: Vorskla Stadium; Attendance: 0 Referee: Denys Shurman |
Note: Match was played behind closed doors due to quarantine in Ukraine during COVID-19 pandemic.

| 28 June 2020 28 | Vorskla Poltava | 0–0 | Olimpik Donetsk | Poltava |
| 19:30 EEST (UTC+03:00) | Puclin (yellow card) 41' | Report | Zahedi (yellow card) 22'; Kychak (yellow card) 45+2'; Politylo (yellow card) 45+2'; Verbnyi (yellow card) 53'; Zotko (yellow card) 88' | Stadium: Vorskla Stadium; Attendance: 0 Referee: Viktor Kopiyevskyi |
Note: Match was played behind closed doors due to quarantine in Ukraine during COVID-19 pandemic.

| 3 July 2020 29 | FC Lviv | 2–2 | Vorskla Poltava | Ternopil |
| 19:00 EEST (UTC+03:00) | Iacovelli (yellow card) 22', (goal) 55'; Tatarkov (yellow card) 45+1'; Sabino (yellow card) 52'; Honchar (yellow card) 70'; Borzenko 75' | Report | Chelyadin 8'; Gadzhuk (yellow card) 17'; Kravchuk (yellow card) 23', (goal) 89'; Melnychuk (yellow card) 62'; Dubko (yellow card) 74' | Stadium: Ternopilsky Misky Stadion; Attendance: 0 Referee: Yurii Ivanov |
Note: Match was played behind closed doors due to quarantine in Ukraine during COVID-19 pandemic.

| 11 July 2020 30 | Karpaty Lviv | – + | Vorskla Poltava | Lviv |
| EEST (UTC+03:00) | | Report | | Stadium: Ukraina Stadium |

| 16 July 2020 31 | Vorskla Poltava | 1–2 | FC Mariupol | Poltava |
| 17:00 EEST (UTC+03:00) | Pavliyk 46'; Chelyadin (yellow card) 66' (yellow-red card) 90+1' | Report | Ihnatenko (yellow card) 40' (red card) 51'; Churko 56' (pen.); Kulakov (yellow card) 58'; Myshnyov (yellow card) 66'; Bykov (yellow card) 68'; Kyryukhantsev 86' | Stadium: Vorskla Stadium; Attendance: 0 Referee: Denys Shurman |
Note: Match was played behind closed doors due to quarantine in Ukraine during COVID-19 pandemic.

| 19 July 2020 32 | SC Dnipro-1 | 3–0 | Vorskla Poltava | Dnipro |
| 17:00 EEST (UTC+03:00) | Lohinov (yellow card) 8'; Buletsa (yellow card) 23'; Supriaha 25', 40'; Khoblenko 50'; Nazarenko (yellow card) 90' | Report | | Stadium: Dnipro-Arena; Attendance: 0 Referee: Oleksiy Derevinskyi |
Note: Match was played behind closed doors due to quarantine in Ukraine during COVID-19 pandemic.

=== Ukrainian Cup ===
| 30 October 2019 Round of 16 (1/8) | Kolos Kovalivka | 0–1 | Vorskla Poltava | Kyiv |
| 17:00 EET (UTC+02:00) | Sakhnevych (yellow card) 27'; Volkov (yellow card) 54' | Report | Sapay (yellow card) 26'; Vasin (yellow card) 40'; Perduta (yellow card) 57'; Kozyrenko 68'; Kravchenko (yellow card) 90+4' | Stadium: Obolon Arena; Attendance: 628; Referee: Mykola Kozyryatskyi |

| 12 March 2020 Quarterfinal | Desna Chernihiv | 0–1 | Vorskla Poltava | Chernihiv |
| 19:00 EET (UTC+02:00) | Kuzyk (yellow card) 41'; Tamm (yellow card) 63'; Yermakov (yellow card) 76' | Report | Kane (yellow card) 34'; Vasin (yellow card) 39', (goal) 64' (pen.); Luizão (yellow card) 41'; Yakubu (yellow card) 55'; Bayenko (yellow card) 60'; Sklyar (yellow card) 76' | Stadium: Chernihiv Stadium; Attendance: 0 Referee: Yevhen Aranovskyi |
Note: Match was played behind closed doors due to quarantine in Ukraine during COVID-19 pandemic

| 24 June 2020 Semifinal | FC Mariupol | 1–1 (2 – 3 p) | Vorskla Poltava | Mariupol |
| 19:30 EEST (UTC+03:00) | Topalov (yellow card) 32'; Horbunov 37'; Tyschenko (yellow card) 84'; Bykov (yellow card) 114' | Report | Sklyar (yellow card) 70'; Kane 80' (pen.); Puclin (yellow card) 81'; Chesnakov (yellow card) 87' | Stadium: Volodymyr Boiko Stadium; Attendance: 0 Referee: Kateryna Monzul |
| | Penalties |
| | Kulakov (penalty missed); Kashchuk (penalty scored); Polehenko (penalty scored); Ihnatenko (penalty missed); Korniyenko (penalty missed) | | Puclin (penalty scored); Šehić (penalty missed); Kane (penalty scored); Sklyar (penalty scored); Bayenko (penalty missed) |
Note: Match was played behind closed doors due to quarantine in Ukraine during COVID-19 pandemic.

| 8 July 2020 Final | Dynamo Kyiv | 1–1 (8 – 7 p) | Vorskla Poltava | Kharkiv |
| 21:30 EEST (UTC+03:00) | Syrota (yellow card) 9'; Verbič 28', (yellow card) 113'; Shabanov (yellow card) 80'; Buyalskyi (yellow card) 88' | Report | Stepanyuk 11'; Sklyar (yellow card) 41'; Perduta (yellow card) 105' | Stadium: OSC Metalist; Attendance: 0 Referee: Kateryna Monzul |
| | Penalties |
| | Verbič (penalty scored); Tsyhankov (penalty scored); Kędziora (penalty scored) de Pena (penalty scored); Andriyevskyi (penalty scored); Sydorchuk (penalty scored); Shaparenko (penalty scored); Mykolenko (penalty missed); Shabanov (penalty scored) | | Puclin (penalty scored); Kane (penalty scored); Luizão (penalty scored); Opanasenko (penalty scored); Ndiaye (penalty scored); Chesnakov (penalty scored); Perduta (penalty scored); Sapay (penalty missed); Bayenko (penalty missed) |
Note: Match was played behind closed doors due to quarantine in Ukraine during COVID-19 pandemic.

== Statistics ==
=== Appearances and goals ===
| No. | Pos | Nat | Player | Total | | Premier League | | Cup | |
| No. | Pos | Nat | Player | Apps | Goals | Apps | Goals | Apps | Goals |
Goalkeepers
| 12 | GK | (Ukraine) UKR | Danylo Kanevtsev | 1 | 0 | 1 | 0 | 0 | 0 |
| 21 | GK | (Ukraine) UKR | Oleksandr Tkachenko | 14 | 0 | 13+1 | 0 | 0 | 0 |
| 31 | GK | (Ukraine) UKR | Dmytro Riznyk | 18 | 0 | 14 | 0 | 4 | 0 |
| 51 | GK | (Ukraine) UKR | Pavlo Isenko | 3 | 0 | 2 | 0 | 0+1 | 0 |
Defenders
| 5 | DF | (Ghana) GHA | Najeeb Yakubu | 15 | 1 | 4+9 | 1 | 2 | 0 |
| 17 | DF | (Ukraine) UKR | Volodymyr Chesnakov | 29 | 0 | 25 | 0 | 4 | 0 |
| 18 | DF | (Ukraine) UKR | Yevhen Pavlyuk | 4 | 1 | 3+1 | 1 | 0 | 0 |
| 23 | DF | (Ukraine) UKR | Vadym Sapay | 16 | 0 | 13 | 0 | 3 | 0 |
| 25 | DF | (Ukraine) UKR | Yevhen Martynenko | 12 | 0 | 10+1 | 0 | 1 | 0 |
| 27 | DF | (Ukraine) UKR | Volodymyr Bayenko | 19 | 1 | 13+2 | 1 | 1+3 | 0 |
| 36 | DF | (Ukraine) UKR | Bohdan Chuyev | 1 | 0 | 0+1 | 0 | 0 | 0 |
| 37 | DF | (Ukraine) UKR | Valeriy Dubko | 4 | 0 | 2+2 | 0 | 0 | 0 |
| 39 | DF | (Ukraine) UKR | Yevhen Opanasenko | 3 | 0 | 1+1 | 0 | 0+1 | 0 |
| 43 | DF | (Ukraine) UKR | Taras Dmytruk | 3 | 0 | 2+1 | 0 | 0 | 0 |
| 45 | DF | (Ukraine) UKR | Maksym Melnychuk | 9 | 0 | 8 | 0 | 0+1 | 0 |
| 50 | DF | (Mali) MLI | Ibrahim Kane | 21 | 2 | 16+2 | 1 | 3 | 1 |
Midfielders
| 4 | MF | (Ukraine) UKR | Ihor Perduta | 28 | 2 | 24 | 2 | 4 | 0 |
| 6 | MF | (Ukraine) UKR | Oleksandr Sklyar | 20 | 0 | 14+3 | 0 | 3 | 0 |
| 8 | MF | (Ukraine) UKR | Artem Habelok | 14 | 0 | 11+2 | 0 | 1 | 0 |
| 13 | MF | (Ukraine) UKR | Oleh Vlasov | 4 | 0 | 3+1 | 0 | 0 | 0 |
| 15 | MF | (Ukraine) UKR | Artem Kulakovskyi | 2 | 0 | 0+2 | 0 | 0 | 0 |
| 19 | MF | (Ukraine) UKR | Yan Kostenko | 1 | 0 | 0+1 | 0 | 0 | 0 |
| 24 | MF | (Ukraine) UKR | Radion Posyevkin | 3 | 0 | 0+3 | 0 | 0 | 0 |
| 28 | MF | (Croatia) CRO | David Puclin | 12 | 0 | 9 | 0 | 3 | 0 |
| 38 | MF | (Ukraine) UKR | Artem Chelyadin | 7 | 1 | 4+3 | 1 | 0 | 0 |
| 42 | MF | (Ukraine) UKR | Illya Hadzhuk | 4 | 0 | 3+1 | 0 | 0 | 0 |
| 47 | MF | (Ukraine) UKR | Artem Bilyi | 3 | 0 | 2+1 | 0 | 0 | 0 |
| 49 | MF | (Ukraine) UKR | Danylo Buhayenko | 1 | 0 | 0+1 | 0 | 0 | 0 |
| 52 | MF | (Ukraine) UKR | Daniil Syemilyet | 3 | 0 | 2+1 | 0 | 0 | 0 |
| 82 | MF | (Ukraine) UKR | Pavlo Rebenok | 21 | 0 | 10+10 | 0 | 1 | 0 |
| 92 | MF | (France) FRA | Pape-Alioune Ndiaye | 17 | 0 | 12+2 | 0 | 3 | 0 |
Forwards
| 10 | FW | (Ukraine) UKR | Vladyslav Kulach | 12 | 2 | 8+1 | 2 | 3 | 0 |
| 11 | FW | (Ukraine) UKR | Ruslan Stepanyuk | 12 | 5 | 9 | 4 | 2+1 | 1 |
| 14 | FW | (Ukraine) UKR | Danylo Kravchuk | 9 | 1 | 3+4 | 1 | 0+2 | 0 |
| 16 | FW | (Ukraine) UKR | Yuriy Kozyrenko | 10 | 1 | 6+3 | 0 | 0+1 | 1 |
| 35 | FW | (Ukraine) UKR | Denys Halata | 4 | 0 | 0+4 | 0 | 0 | 0 |
| 77 | FW | (Ukraine) UKR | Denys Vasin | 24 | 5 | 14+8 | 4 | 2 | 1 |
Players transferred out during the season
| 2 | DF | (Ukraine) UKR | Zurab Ochihava | 3 | 0 | 1+2 | 0 | 0 | 0 |
| 7 | MF | (Brazil) BRA | Luizão | 23 | 1 | 18+2 | 1 | 2+1 | 0 |
| 9 | FW | (Bosnia and Herzegovina) BIH | Edin Šehić | 13 | 2 | 9+2 | 2 | 0+2 | 0 |
| 10 | FW | (Albania) ALB | Rubin Hebaj | 5 | 0 | 1+4 | 0 | 0 | 0 |
| 22 | FW | (Ukraine) UKR | Andriy Stryzhak | 5 | 0 | 3+2 | 0 | 0 | 0 |
| 26 | FW | (Ukraine) UKR | Yuriy Kolomoyets | 13 | 2 | 12+1 | 2 | 0 | 0 |
| 29 | MF | (Ukraine) UKR | Dmytro Kravchenko | 6 | 0 | 2+3 | 0 | 0+1 | 0 |
| 40 | DF | (Ukraine) UKR | Taras Sakiv | 3 | 0 | 2+1 | 0 | 0 | 0 |
| 66 | DF | (Brazil) BRA | Artur | 15 | 0 | 11+3 | 0 | 1 | 0 |
| 94 | MF | (Serbia) SRB | Todor Petrović | 14 | 0 | 11+2 | 0 | 1 | 0 |

Source: Competitions

Last updated: 19 July 2020

=== Goalscorers ===
| Rank | No. | Pos | Nat | Name | Premier League | Cup | Total |
|---|---|---|---|---|---|---|---|
| 1 | 11 | FW | (Ukraine) | Ruslan Stepanyuk | 4 | 1 | 5 |
| 1 | 77 | FW | (Ukraine) | Denys Vasin | 4 | 1 | 5 |
| 3 | 4 | MF | (Ukraine) | Ihor Perduta | 2 | 0 | 2 |
| 3 | 9 | FW | (Bosnia and Herzegovina) | Edin Šehić | 2 | 0 | 2 |
| 3 | 10 | FW | (Ukraine) | Vladyslav Kulach | 2 | 0 | 2 |
| 3 | 11 | FW | (Ukraine) | Ruslan Stepanyuk | 2 | 0 | 2 |
| 3 | 26 | FW | (Ukraine) | Yuriy Kolomoyets | 2 | 0 | 2 |
| 3 | 50 | DF | (Mali) | Ibrahim Kane | 1 | 1 | 2 |
| 9 | 5 | DF | (Ghana) | Najeeb Yakubu | 1 | 0 | 1 |
| 9 | 7 | MF | (Brazil) | Luizão | 1 | 0 | 1 |
| 9 | 14 | FW | (Ukraine) | Danylo Kravchuk | 1 | 0 | 1 |
| 9 | 16 | FW | (Ukraine) | Yuriy Kozyrenko | 0 | 1 | 1 |
| 9 | 18 | DF | (Ukraine) | Yevhen Pavlyuk | 1 | 0 | 1 |
| 9 | 27 | DF | (Ukraine) | Volodymyr Bayenko | 1 | 0 | 1 |
| 9 | 37 | MF | (Ukraine) | Artem Chelyadin | 1 | 0 | 1 |
| | | | | Total | 23 | 4 | 27 |

Last updated: 19 July 2020

=== Clean sheets ===
| Rank | No. | Pos | Nat | Name | Premier League | Cup | Total |
|---|---|---|---|---|---|---|---|
| 1 | 31 | GK | (Ukraine) | Dmytro Riznyk | 4 | 2 | 6 |
| 1 | 21 | GK | (Ukraine) | Oleksandr Tkachenko | 2 | 0 | 2 |
| | | | | Total | 6 | 2 | 8 |

Last updated: 19 July 2020

=== Disciplinary record ===
| No. | Pos | Nat | Player | Premier League | | | Cup | | | Total | | |
| No. | Pos | Nat | Player | Booked | (yellow card) (yellow-red card) | Sent off (straight red) | Booked | (yellow card) (yellow-red card) | Sent off (straight red) | Booked | (yellow card) (yellow-red card) | Sent off (straight red) |
| 2 | DF | (Ukraine) | Zurab Ochihava | 1 | 0 | 0 | 0 | 0 | 0 | 1 | 0 | 0 |
| 4 | MF | (Ukraine) | Ihor Perduta | 6 | 0 | 1 | 2 | 0 | 0 | 8 | 0 | 1 |
| 5 | DF | (Ghana) | Najeeb Yakubu | 2 | 0 | 0 | 1 | 0 | 0 | 3 | 0 | 0 |
| 6 | MF | (Ukraine) | Oleksandr Sklyar | 7 | 1 | 0 | 3 | 0 | 0 | 10 | 1 | 0 |
| 7 | MF | (Brazil) | Luizão | 5 | 1 | 0 | 1 | 0 | 0 | 6 | 1 | 0 |
| 8 | MF | (Ukraine) | Artem Habelok | 2 | 0 | 0 | 0 | 0 | 0 | 2 | 0 | 0 |
| 9 | FW | (Bosnia and Herzegovina) | Edin Šehić | 5 | 0 | 0 | 0 | 0 | 0 | 5 | 0 | 0 |
| 10 | FW | (Ukraine) | Vladyslav Kulach | 3 | 0 | 0 | 0 | 0 | 0 | 3 | 0 | 0 |
| 11 | FW | (Ukraine) | Ruslan Stepanyuk | 1 | 0 | 0 | 0 | 0 | 0 | 1 | 0 | 0 |
| 14 | FW | (Ukraine) | Danylo Kravchuk | 1 | 0 | 0 | 0 | 0 | 0 | 1 | 0 | 0 |
| 17 | DF | (Ukraine) | Volodymyr Chesnakov | 6 | 0 | 0 | 1 | 0 | 0 | 7 | 0 | 0 |
| 22 | FW | (Ukraine) | Andriy Stryzhak | 1 | 0 | 0 | 0 | 0 | 0 | 1 | 0 | 0 |
| 23 | DF | (Ukraine) | Vadym Sapay | 4 | 0 | 0 | 1 | 0 | 0 | 5 | 0 | 0 |
| 25 | DF | (Ukraine) | Yevhen Martynenko | 1 | 1 | 0 | 0 | 0 | 0 | 1 | 1 | 0 |
| 26 | FW | (Ukraine) | Yuriy Kolomoyets | 4 | 0 | 0 | 0 | 0 | 0 | 4 | 0 | 0 |
| 27 | DF | (Ukraine) | Volodymyr Bayenko | 4 | 1 | 0 | 1 | 0 | 0 | 5 | 1 | 0 |
| 28 | MF | (Croatia) | David Puclin | 3 | 0 | 0 | 2 | 0 | 0 | 5 | 0 | 0 |
| 29 | MF | (Ukraine) | Dmytro Kravchenko | 1 | 0 | 0 | 1 | 0 | 0 | 2 | 0 | 0 |
| 37 | DF | (Ukraine) | Valeriy Dubko | 1 | 0 | 0 | 0 | 0 | 0 | 1 | 0 | 0 |
| 38 | MF | (Ukraine) | Artem Chelyadin | 1 | 1 | 0 | 0 | 0 | 0 | 1 | 1 | 0 |
| 45 | MF | (Ukraine) | Maksym Melnychuk | 2 | 0 | 0 | 0 | 0 | 0 | 2 | 0 | 0 |
| 50 | DF | (Mali) | Ibrahim Kane | 4 | 0 | 0 | 1 | 0 | 0 | 5 | 0 | 0 |
| 66 | DF | (Brazil) | Artur | 4 | 0 | 0 | 0 | 0 | 0 | 4 | 0 | 0 |
| 77 | FW | (Ukraine) | Denys Vasin | 7 | 0 | 0 | 2 | 0 | 0 | 9 | 0 | 0 |
| 82 | MF | (Ukraine) | Pavlo Rebenok | 2 | 0 | 0 | 0 | 0 | 0 | 2 | 0 | 0 |
| 92 | MF | (France) | Pape-Alioune Ndiaye | 3 | 0 | 0 | 0 | 0 | 0 | 3 | 0 | 0 |
| 94 | MF | (Serbia) | Todor Petrović | 3 | 0 | 0 | 0 | 0 | 0 | 3 | 0 | 0 |
| | | | Total | 84 | 4 | 1 | 15 | 0 | 0 | 99 | 4 | 1 |

Last updated: 19 July 2020

=== Attendances ===
| | Matches | Attendances | Average | High | Low |
|---|---|---|---|---|---|
| Premier League | 15 | 43,194 | 2,879 | 11,399 | 0 |
| Cup | 0 | 0 | 0 | 0 | 0 |
| Total | 15 | 43,194 | 2,879 | 11,399 | 0 |

Last updated: 19 July 2020
