= List of Ukrainian football transfers winter 2020–21 =

This is a list of Ukrainian football transfers winter 2020–21. Only clubs in 2020–21 Ukrainian Premier League are included.

== Ukrainian Premier League ==
=== Desna Chernihiv ===
In:

No.	Pos.	Nation	Player
—	DF	ROU	Constantin Dima (from (Romania) Astra Giurgiu)
—	DF	UKR	Artem Sukhotskyi (from (Slovakia) Slovan Bratislava)
—	MF	UKR	Bohdan Biloshevskyi (on loan from Dynamo Kyiv)
—	MF	UKR	Yevhen Chepurnenko (from Dinaz Vyshhorod)
—	MF	UKR	Renat Mochulyak (loan return from (Moldova) Sfântul Gheorghe)
—	FW	UKR	Denys Bezborodko (from FC Oleksandriya)
—	FW	UKR	Vladyslav Vakula (on loan from Shakhtar Donetsk)
—	FW	UKR	Danylo Kibalnyk

Out:

No.	Pos.	Nation	Player
—	DF	UKR	Artur Zapadnya (to Metalist 1925 Kharkiv)
—	MF	UKR	Yevheniy Belych (on loan to Dinaz Vyshhorod)
—	MF	UKR	Mykhailo Mudryk (loan return to Shakhtar Donetsk)
—	MF	UKR	Andriy Slotyuk (on loan to Metal Kharkiv)
—	MF	UKR	Serhiy Starenkyi (to Dinaz Vyshhorod)
—	FW	UKR	Dmytro Khlyobas (to Kolos Kovalivka)
—	FW	UKR	Illya Shevtsov (on loan to Inhulets Petrove)
—	FW	UKR	Vladyslav Vakula (loan return to Shakhtar Donetsk)

=== Dnipro-1 ===
In:

No.	Pos.	Nation	Player
—	GK	GEO	Zauri Makharadze (from Zorya Luhansk)
—	DF	UKR	Maksym Lopyryonok (loan return from FC Mynai)
—	MF	BRA	Vagner Gonçalves (from (Georgia (country)) Dinamo Batumi)
—	FW	BRA	Bill (on loan from (Brazil) Flamengo)
—	FW	CRO	Mario Ćuže (on loan from (Croatia) Dinamo Zagreb)

Out:

No.	Pos.	Nation	Player
—	DF	UKR	Maksym Lopyryonok (to (Tajikistan) Istiklol)
—	MF	UKR	Oleksandr Byelyayev (on loan to VPK-Ahro Shevchenkivka)
—	MF	UKR	Dmytro Korkishko (to Chornomorets Odesa)
—	MF	UKR	Serhiy Kravchenko (to Chornomorets Odesa)
—	FW	UKR	Oleksiy Chychykov (to (Kazakhstan) Akzhayik)

=== Dynamo Kyiv ===
In:

No.	Pos.	Nation	Player
—	DF	BRA	Sidcley (loan return from (Brazil) Corinthians)
—	MF	UKR	Akhmed Alibekov (loan return from (Russia) FC Ufa)
—	MF	UKR	Illya Hadzhuk (from Vorskla Poltava)
—	MF	GHA	Mohammed Kadiri (loan return from (Russia) Arsenal Tula)
—	MF	UKR	Ivan Kalyuzhnyi (loan return from Rukh Lviv)
—	MF	UKR	Oleh Vlasov (from Vorskla Poltava)

Out:

No.	Pos.	Nation	Player
—	DF	UKR	Bohdan Biloshevskyi (on loan to Desna Chernihiv)
—	DF	UKR	Artem Shabanov (on loan to (Poland) Legia Warsaw)
—	MF	UKR	Roman Bodnya (on loan to Chornomorets Odesa)
—	MF	UKR	Ivan Kalyuzhnyi (to FC Oleksandriya)
—	MF	UKR	Vadym Mashchenko (on loan to Chornomorets Odesa)
—	MF	UKR	Heorhiy Tsitaishvili (on loan to Vorskla Poltava)
—	MF	UKR	Artur Vashchyshyn (on loan to Chornomorets Odesa)
—	FW	UKR	Nazariy Rusyn (on loan to (Poland) Legia Warsaw)
—	FW	UKR	Danyil Sukhoruchko (on loan to Chornomorets Odesa)

=== Inhulets Petrove ===
In:

No.	Pos.	Nation	Player
—	DF	NED	Hennos Asmelash (free agent)
—	DF	TUN	Mohamed Ali Ben Salem (from (Tunisia) ES Métlaoui)
—	DF	UKR	Stanislav Peredystyi (loan return from VPK-Ahro Shevchenkivka)
—	MF	UKR	Ihor Chaykovskyi (from Zorya Luhansk)
—	MF	UKR	Andriy Korobenko (free agent)
—	FW	UKR	Illya Shevtsov (on loan from Desna Chernihiv)
—	FW	UKR	Denys Vasin (on loan from Vorskla Poltava)

Out:

No.	Pos.	Nation	Player
—	DF	UKR	Dmytro Fatyeyev (to Kryvbas Kryvyi Rih (2020))
—	DF	UKR	Bohdan Lytvyak (to Hirnyk-Sport H. Plavni)
—	MF	UKR	Vladyslav Ihnatyev (to Hirnyk-Sport H. Plavni)
—	FW	GHA	Rudolf Blagogee

=== Kolos Kovalivka ===
In:

No.	Pos.	Nation	Player
—	GK	UKR	Kyrylo Fesyun (from Vorskla Poltava)
—	GK	UKR	Anton Yashkov (loan return from Polissya Zhytomyr)
—	DF	UKR	Yevhen Kostyuk (from Nyva Vinnytsia)
—	DF	SLO	Matija Rom (free agent)
—	DF	BLR	Nikolay Zolotov (from (Russia) Ural Yekaterinburg)
—	MF	UKR	Vyacheslav Churko (on loan from Shakhtar Donetsk)
—	MF	UKR	Oleksiy Lobov (loan return from Avanhard Kramatorsk)
—	MF	CMR	Alvaro Ngamba (from Podillya Khmelnytskyi)
—	MF	UKR	Stanislav Sorokin (loan return from Kremin Kremenchuk)
—	MF	UKR	Volodymyr Stolyar (on loan from Bukovyna Chernivtsi)
—	FW	UKR	Oleksandr Bondarenko (loan return from Volyn Lutsk)
—	FW	UKR	Dmytro Khlyobas (from Desna Chernihiv)

Out:

No.	Pos.	Nation	Player
—	GK	UKR	Anton Yashkov (to Polissya Zhytomyr)
—	DF	UKR	Maksym Maksymenko (to (Greece) AEL Larissa)
—	DF	UKR	Vladyslav Yemets (loan return to Zorya Luhansk)
—	MF	UKR	Oleksiy Lobov (to Obolon Kyiv)
—	MF	UKR	Stanislav Morarenko (on loan to Podillya Khmelnytskyi)
—	FW	UKR	Oleksandr Bondarenko
—	FW	UKR	Stanislav Koval (on loan to Polissya Zhytomyr)

=== Lviv ===
In:

No.	Pos.	Nation	Player
—	GK	UKR	Oleksandr Ilyuschenkov (free agent)
—	DF	UKR	Ivan Lobay (from (Estonia) Nõmme Kalju)
—	MF	BRA	Alvaro (loan return from (Azerbaijan) Keşla)
—	MF	UKR	Ivan Brikner (from Rukh Lviv)
—	MF	UKR	Oleksiy Dovhyi (from FC Oleksandriya)
—	MF	ARG	Lautaro Novach (from (Argentina) Quilmes)
—	MF	BRA	Lipe Veloso (loan return from (Belarus) Torpedo-BelAZ Zhodino)
—	MF	BRA	Pedro Vitor (loan return from (Finland) KuPS)
—	MF	UKR	Dmytro Semeniv (from Hirnyk-Sport H. Plavni)
—	FW	BRA	Pernambuco (loan return from (Georgia (country)) Dinamo Tbilisi)
—	FW	BRA	Renan de Oliveira (loan return from (Portugal) Gil Vicente)

Out:

No.	Pos.	Nation	Player
—	GK	UKR	Herman Penkov (to (Armenia) Pyunik Yerevan)
—	DF	CRO	Maks Čelić (to (Croatia) NK Varaždin)
—	DF	UKR	Yehor Klymenchuk (to Ararat-Armenia)
—	DF	UKR	Yuriy Kravchuk (loan return to Hirnyk-Sport H. Plavni)
—	DF	UKR	Oleksandr Savoshko (to Veres Rivne)
—	MF	EST	Mihkel Ainsalu (to (Denmark) FC Helsingør)
—	MF	UKR	Ihor Koshman (to (Estonia) Tallinna JK Legion)
—	MF	BRA	Lipe Veloso (to (Latvia) Riga FC)
—	MF	BRA	Pedro Vitor (to (Brazil) Azuriz)
—	MF	UKR	Andriy Vychizhanin (to Karpaty Halych)
—	FW	BRA	Filipe Pachtmann (on loan to (Azerbaijan) Zira)
—	FW	BRA	Pernambuco (on loan to (Norway) Bodø/Glimt)

=== Mariupol ===
In:

No.	Pos.	Nation	Player
—	DF	UKR	Oleksandr Drambayev (on loan from Shakhtar Donetsk)
—	DF	UKR	Mark Mampassi (on loan from Shakhtar Donetsk)
—	DF	UKR	Kyrylo Melichenko (from Shakhtar Donetsk)
—	DF	UKR	Danylo Sahutkin (from Shakhtar Donetsk)

Out:

No.	Pos.	Nation	Player
—	GK	UKR	Artem Pospyelov (on loan to Avanhard Kramatorsk)
—	DF	UKR	Danylo Sahutkin (loan return to Shakhtar Donetsk)
—	DF	UKR	Dmytro Shynkarenko (on loan to Avanhard Kramatorsk)
—	DF	UKR	Vyacheslav Velyev (to Hirnyk-Sport H. Plavni)
—	FW	UKR	Stanislav Biblyk (loan return to Shakhtar Donetsk)
—	FW	UKR	Oleksandr Kozhevnikov (to Vorskla Poltava)

=== Mynai ===
In:

No.	Pos.	Nation	Player
—	DF	MLI	Siaka Bagayoko (from (Mali) Djoliba AC)
—	DF	UKR	Danylo Karas (from Hirnyk-Sport H. Plavni)
—	DF	UKR	Mykhaylo Kopolovets
—	DF	UKR	Oleksiy Kovtun (from (Belarus) Rukh Brest)
—	DF	UKR	Maksym Lopyryonok (from (Tajikistan) Istiklol)
—	MF	UKR	Vitaliy Boyko (from (Spain) CF Sant Rafel)
—	MF	UKR	Orest Panchyshyn (from Karpaty Lviv)
—	MF	UKR	Oleksandr Petrusenko (from Hirnyk-Sport H. Plavni)
—	FW	UKR	Artem Milevskyi (from (Belarus) Dynamo Brest)
—	FW	NGR	Ugochukwu Oduenyi (from (Austria) SV Ried)

Out:

No.	Pos.	Nation	Player
—	DF	UKR	Oleh Dopilka (to FC Uzhhorod)
—	DF	UKR	Danylo Karas
—	DF	UKR	Mykhaylo Kopolovets (retired)
—	DF	UKR	Maksym Lopyryonok (loan return to SC Dnipro-1)
—	DF	UKR	Kyrylo Melichenko (loan return to Shakhtar Donetsk)
—	DF	UKR	Dmytro Pavlish (loan return to Shakhtar Donetsk)
—	MF	ESP	Edgar Caparrós
—	MF	UKR	Oleksandr Hlahola (to Polissya Zhytomyr)
—	MF	UKR	Oleh Holodyuk (to Metalist 1925 Kharkiv)
—	MF	UKR	Artur Karnoza (to Kryvbas Kryvyi Rih (2020))
—	MF	UKR	Oleksiy Shpak (on loan to Epitsentr Dunaivtsi)
—	FW	UKR	Anton Shynder

=== Oleksandriya ===
In:

No.	Pos.	Nation	Player
—	DF	UKR	Dmytro Semenov (loan return from (Latvia) Jelgava)
—	MF	UKR	Kyrylo Dryshlyuk (loan return from (Latvia) Spartaks Jūrmala)
—	MF	UKR	Ivan Kalyuzhnyi (from Dynamo Kyiv)

Out:

No.	Pos.	Nation	Player
—	GK	UKR	Dmytro Rudyk
—	DF	UKR	Dmytro Semenov (on loan to Kremin Kremenchuk)
—	MF	UKR	Oleksiy Dovhyi (to FC Lviv)
—	MF	UKR	Mykyta Dudka (on loan to Kremin Kremenchuk)
—	MF	UKR	Vasyl Hrytsuk (to Polissya Zhytomyr)
—	MF	UKR	Maksym Ivakhno (on loan to Kremin Kremenchuk)
—	MF	UKR	Maksym Zaderaka (to (Armenia) Ararat Yerevan)
—	FW	UKR	Denys Bezborodko (to Desna Chernihiv)

=== Olimpik Donetsk ===
In:

No.	Pos.	Nation	Player
—	DF	UKR	Bohdan Veklyak (from Hirnyk-Sport Horishni Plavni)
—	MF	CIV	Geo Danny Ekra (free agent)
—	MF	UKR	Vladyslav Khamelyuk (from Chornomorets Odesa)
—	MF	BRA	Talles (from (Brazil) Vila Nova)
—	FW	NGR	Geoffrey Chinedu (loan return from (Estonia) Narva Trans)
—	FW	UKR	Yevhen Mohil (on loan from Rubikon Kyiv)
—	FW	CMR	Taddeus Nkeng (free agent)

Out:

No.	Pos.	Nation	Player
—	DF	UKR	Rizvan Ablitarov
—	DF	UKR	Dmytro Hryshko (retired)
—	MF	BLR	Kirill Kirilenko (to (Belarus) Torpedo-BelAZ Zhodino)
—	MF	UKR	Andriy Kravchuk (to (Russia) Torpedo Moscow)
—	MF	UKR	Pavlo Ksyonz (to VPK-Ahro Shevchenkivka)
—	FW	NGR	Geoffrey Chinedu (on loan to (Finland) FC Lahti)
—	FW	IRI	Shahab Zahedi (to Zorya Luhansk)

=== Rukh Lviv ===
In:

No.	Pos.	Nation	Player
—	DF	UKR	Hlib Savchuk (from Karpaty Lviv)
—	DF	ISL	Ragnar Sigurðsson (from (Denmark) Copenhagen)
—	MF	UKR	Oleksandr Chepelyuk (loan return from Hirnyk-Sport H. Plavni)
—	MF	UKR	Roman Karasyuk (from (Hungary) Kisvárda)
—	MF	UKR	Oleksiy Sych (loan return from Karpaty Halych)
—	FW	UZB	Bobur Abdikholikov (from (Uzbekistan) Nasaf)
—	FW	UKR	Andriy Boryachuk (on loan from Shakhtar Donetsk)
—	FW	UKR	Rostyslav Lyakh (loan return from Karpaty Halych)
—	FW	UKR	Dmytro Shostak (from Karpaty Lviv)

Out:

No.	Pos.	Nation	Player
—	DF	UKR	Ihor Duts
—	DF	UKR	Vadym Paramonov (to (Armenia) Urartu Yerevan)
—	DF	UKR	Volodymyr Zastavnyi
—	MF	UKR	Ihor Boychuk (to Ahrobiznes Volochysk)
—	MF	UKR	Ivan Brikner (to FC Lviv)
—	MF	UKR	Oleksandr Chepelyuk (to Hirnyk-Sport H. Plavni)
—	MF	UKR	Ivan Kaliuzhnyi (loan return to Dynamo Kyiv)
—	FW	ISR	Hisham Layous (to (Israel) Kafr Qasim)

=== Shakhtar Donetsk ===
In:

No.	Pos.	Nation	Player
—	DF	UKR	Bohdan Butko (loan return from (Poland) Lech Poznań)
—	DF	UKR	Kyrylo Melichenko (loan return from FC Mynai)
—	DF	UKR	Dmytro Pavlish (loan return from FC Mynai)
—	DF	UKR	Danylo Sahutkin (loan return from FC Mariupol)
—	MF	UKR	Mykhailo Mudryk (loan return from Desna Chernihiv)
—	FW	UKR	Stanislav Biblyk (loan return from FC Mariupol)
—	FW	UKR	Andriy Boryachuk (loan return from (Hungary) Mezőkövesd)
—	FW	UKR	Vladyslav Vakula (loan return from Desna Chernihiv)

Out:

No.	Pos.	Nation	Player
—	DF	UKR	Bohdan Butko (on loan to (Turkey) BB Erzurumspor)
—	DF	UKR	Oleksandr Drambayev (on loan to FC Mariupol)
—	DF	UKR	Mark Mampassi (on loan to FC Mariupol)
—	DF	UKR	Kyrylo Melichenko (to FC Mariupol)
—	DF	UKR	Dmytro Pavlish (on loan to Hirnyk-Sport H. Plavni)
—	DF	UKR	Danylo Sahutkin (to FC Mariupol)
—	MF	UKR	Vyacheslav Churko (on loan to Kolos Kovalivka)
—	MF	UKR	Viktor Kovalenko (to (Italy) Atalanta)
—	MF	BRA	Taison (to (Brazil) Internacional)
—	FW	UKR	Andriy Boryachuk (on loan to Rukh Lviv)
—	FW	UKR	Vladyslav Vakula (on loan to Desna Chernihiv)

=== Vorskla Poltava ===
In:

No.	Pos.	Nation	Player
—	DF	NED	Bradley de Nooijer (on loan from (Romania) Viitorul Constanța)
—	MF	ESP	Amilcar Codjovi (free agent)
—	MF	BRA	Luizão (from (Portugal) Porto B)
—	MF	LUX	Olivier Thill (from (Russia) FC Ufa)
—	MF	UKR	Heorhiy Tsitaishvili (on loan from Dynamo Kyiv)
—	FW	CIV	Saliia Cherif Konate
—	FW	UKR	Oleksandr Kozhevnikov (from FC Mariupol)
—	FW	UKR	Yuriy Kozyrenko (loan return from Hirnyk-Sport H. Plavni)

Out:

No.	Pos.	Nation	Player
—	GK	UKR	Kyrylo Fesyun (to Kolos Kovalivka)
—	DF	UKR	Volodymyr Bayenko (to (Estonia) Levadia Tallinn)
—	MF	UKR	Illya Hadzhuk (to Dynamo Kyiv)
—	MF	UKR	Dmytro Shcherbak (to SC Poltava)
—	MF	UKR	Mykyta Tatarkov (to (Armenia) Pyunik Yerevan)
—	MF	UKR	Oleh Vlasov (to Dynamo Kyiv)
—	FW	CRO	Ivan Pešić (on loan to (Romania) FC Voluntari)
—	FW	UKR	Yuriy Kozyrenko (on loan to (Belarus) Isloch Minsk Raion)
—	FW	UKR	Denys Vasin (on loan to Inhulets Petrove)

=== Zorya Luhansk ===
In:

No.	Pos.	Nation	Player
—	DF	UKR	Vladyslav Yemets (loan return from Kolos Kovalivka)
—	MF	UKR	Maksym Khlan (from Karpaty Lviv)
—	FW	GHA	Raymond Owusu (from (Ghana) Gold Coast Football Academy)
—	FW	IRI	Shahab Zahedi (from Olimpik Donetsk)

Out:

No.	Pos.	Nation	Player
—	GK	GEO	Zauri Makharadze (to SC Dnipro-1)
—	DF	UKR	Maksym Ahapov (on loan to VPK-Ahro Shevchenkivka)
—	DF	ISR	Max Grechkin (loan return to (Israel) Beitar Jerusalem)
—	DF	UKR	Tymofiy Sukhar (on loan to VPK-Ahro Shevchenkivka)
—	MF	UKR	Ihor Chaykovskyi (to Inhulets Petrove)
—	FW	MNE	Mihailo Perović (to (Slovenia) Olimpija Ljubljana)
—	FW	UKR	Dmytro Piddubnyi (on loan to VPK-Ahro Shevchenkivka)
—	FW	UKR	Ruslan Skydan (to Obolon Kyiv)

== Ukrainian First League ==
=== Hirnyk-Sport Horishni Plavni ===
In: Note: Flags indicate national team as defined under FIFA eligibility rules; some limited exceptions apply. Players may hold more than one non-FIFA nationality.

No.	Pos.	Nation	Player
-	MF	UKR	Ruslan Dedukh (from FC Chernihiv)

Out: Note: Flags indicate national team as defined under FIFA eligibility rules; some limited exceptions apply. Players may hold more than one non-FIFA nationality.

No.	Pos.	Nation	Player

== Ukrainian Second League ==
=== FC Chernihiv ===
In: Note: Flags indicate national team as defined under FIFA eligibility rules; some limited exceptions apply. Players may hold more than one non-FIFA nationality.

No.	Pos.	Nation	Player
-	GK	UKR	Artem Lutchenko (from Kudrivka)
-	MF	UKR	Vyacheslav Koydan (From (Sweden) Sandviken)
-	FW	UKR	Vladyslav Kyryn (from Kudrivka)

Out: Note: Flags indicate national team as defined under FIFA eligibility rules; some limited exceptions apply. Players may hold more than one non-FIFA nationality.

No.	Pos.	Nation	Player
-	GK	UKR	Anatoliy Tymofeyev (to SC Poltava)
-	GK	UKR	Yevhen Novobranets (Released)
-	DF	UKR	Ruslan Dedukh (to Hirnyk-Sport)
-	DF	UKR	Taras Movlyan (Released)
-	DF	UKR	Vladyslav Kosov (Released)
