= Vlasov =

Vlasov or Vlasoff (Russian: Вла́сов; masculine) is a common Russian surname formed from the first name Vlas or from the Greek Βλάσιος (Blaise) meaning simple. There is also a version that the family name can come from the Slavonic vlas meaning hair. According to some versions the surname correlates to the Slavonic god Veles. The feminine form of the surname is Vlasova (Russian: Вла́сова). The surname is shared by:

- Aleksandr Vlasov (disambiguation)
- Andrey Vlasov (1901–1946), Russian general of Red Army who later collaborated with Nazis by leading the Russian Liberation Army against the Soviet Union
- Andrey Vlasov (footballer, born 1965), Russian football player
- Anatoly Vlasov (1908–1975), Soviet physicist, author of the Vlasov equation and McKean–Vlasov process
- Dmitri Vlasov (born 1973), Russian football player
- Dmitry Vlasov (born 1982), Russian tennis player
- Evgenia Vlasova (born 1978), Ukrainian singer-songwriter
- Ilia Vlasov (born 1995), Russian volleyball player
- Ivan Vlasov (1903–1969), Soviet administrator, nominal head of state of Russian Federation
- Maxim Vlasov (born 1986), Russian boxer
- Nikolai Vlasov (1916–1945), flying ace and leader of prisoner uprising in the Mauthausen concentration camp
- Oleg Vlasov (born 1984), Russian footballer
- Oleh Vlasov (born 2002), Ukrainian footballer
- Olesia Vlasova (born 1974), Ukrainian actress
- Peter Vladimirov, pen name of Pyotr Vlasov (1905–1953), Soviet diplomat and journalist, father of Yury Vlasov
- Pavel Vlasov (born 1960), merited test pilot of the Russian Federation
- Simon Vlasov (born 1981), Russian speedway rider
- Tatiana Vlasova (born 1977), Russian ski-orienteer
- Vadim Vlasov (born 1980), Russian football player
- Valentin Vlasov (1946–2020), Russian politician and diplomat
- Veronika Vlasova (born 1966), Russian politician
- Viktor Vlasov (disambiguation)
- Vladimir Vlasov (1902–1986), Russian composer and conductor
- Yuliya Vlasova (born 1967), Russian short track speed skater
- Yuri Vlasov
