= Vlassov =

Vlassov is a surname. Notable people with the surname include:

- Alexander Vlassov (born 1955), Soviet pair skater
- Julia Vlassov (born 1990), American pair skater
- Jüri Vlassov (1948), Estonian actor and singer
- Viktor Vlassov (born 1951), Soviet sport shooter

== See also ==
- Vlasov
