= The Eastern-Siberian Inland Navigation Company =

Transport company

Eastern-Siberian Inland Navigation Company
- Type: Joint-stock company
- Industry: Shipping
- Headquarters: Irkutsk, Russia
- Revenue: $8.2 million (2016)
- Net income: $69,330 (2016)
- Website: vsrp.ru

The Eastern-Siberian Inland Navigation Company (ESINC) is a company that transports goods and passengers by inland waterways of the Irkutsk Oblast and the Buryatia Republic.

ESINC is the largest shipping company in Eastern Siberia, the main transportation carrier on Lake Baikal, the Selenga, the Angara River and its tributaries.

Irkutsk Oblast is rich in reservoirs, which is why there are about 30 ferries. The largest of them are situated on the Olkhon island, in Listvyanka, Balagansk and Svirsk. These ferries belong to ESINC. The others are owned by private businessmen or traffic agencies.

The company has the most high-powered river fleet in the Eastern-Siberian region, the largest number of fleet repairing bases, and the largest network of branch offices. The capacity range allows conveying about 500 thousand passengers per season. There are two main quays in Irkutsk, where the trips originate: the quay "Raketa" and "Gagarin" (Nizhnjaya Naberezhnaya Street). The quay "Raketa", situated in Solnechny microdistrict on bank of Chertugeevskiy Zaliv, is the starting point of all trips along the Angara River and on Lake Baikal.

ESINC's logotype is a blue-white conventionalized ship against a background of waves.

== History ==
The Eastern-Siberian Inland Navigation Company (ESINC) is a public corporation today, it is also the oldest shipping company in Siberia. Its history begins with N. F. Myasnikov's shipping on the Angara River and Lake Baikal.

=== The beginning of shipping in Russia ===
On 20 October 1696 the Boyarskaya Duma (the Council of Boyars) issued an edict (ukaz) at the suit of Peter the Great. This edict ordered: «There must be sea vessels». This important historical event brought Russia into one line with other sea powers. At first the majority of ships navigated on Lake Onega, Ladoga and Gulf of Finland. The ocean and river shipping had been developing through the centuries in Russia, the waterways and shipbuilding were improved, the specialized schools for sailors' training were opened. The steamship building extended on the rivers in European Russia because of steam traction's decisive superiority after the first steamship building in St.Petersburg in 1815.

=== Steamship building on Lake Baikal ===
In 1823 the engineer-mechanic Rozen conceived the idea of steamship building on Lake Baikal. The Siberian sea poses an obstacle to the Russian transport system. The Irkutsk Admiralty Board, which has existed since 1764, was in charge of transportation through Lake Baikal. But the Departments of Navy and Budget didn't support this project. Nikita Fedorivich Myasnikov undertook the hard task of organizing the steamship building there. Nikita Fedorivich Myasnikov was a merchant belonging to the top guild from Rostov, commercial counselor. He was the son of Siberian millionaire Fedor Borisovich Myasnikov and also a gold-miner, owner of distilleries and water mills. He lived in Yalutorovsk. There is his portrait in the Museum of Art in Irkutsk. Until 1920 this portrait decorated the Institute for Noble Maidens, because Myasnikov was one of its benefactors. He was painted in uniform with buttons, which displayed the emblem of Tomsk province, medals for dotation and Order of Saint Stanislaus. N. F. Myasnikov petitioned the Ministry of Finance for the accordance of a privilege to him for a shipping organization on the Siberian rivers. On 8 December 1839 such privilege was granted to him. It admitted the exclusive right to found and to support the shipping company on Lake Baikal and the rivers Ob’, Tobol, Irtysh, Yenisei, Lena and its tributaries over 10 years. But it contained a reservation that steamships must be built in 3 years. This right was repealed in case of its violation. The long distance and difficulties with shipment of equipment didn't allow Myasnikov to meet the tight schedule. That's why the fixed term was extended for navigation in 1843 and 1844 years according to V. Y. Rupert's petition (governor-general of Eastern Siberia).

=== The first steamships on Lake Baikal ===
The place for building steamships was chosen to be 18 verst (63 000 ft) above Irkutsk on the left bank of the Angara River, by the village Grudinino. On 29 March 1843, the foundation of the first steamship's wooden hull was laid. It was operated intensively, the steamship was launched on 15 September. This ship, named Emperor Nicholas I (after Nicholas I of Russia) was 35 m long, 4 m wide and 8 m with paddle guards. The barge for haulage was built together with the steamship. The second ship Successor Cesarevitch (Crown Prince) and a second barge were laid after the first ship's launching. The steamships cruised on Lake Baikal from Listvenichnaya quay at the head of Angara to Posolsk on the eastern shore to the estuary of the Selenga River. Weather permitting, the trip was made in 6 hours at a speed of 15 km/h. There were 3 classes for passengers, but cabins were provided only for first and second class passengers; the steerage was on the deck among carriages and packages. The Myasnikov's heirs inherited the shipping company after his death in 1847. Emperor Nicholas I was damaged during a storm, but was repaired in 1854, and it was burnt and stripped down in 1856. Crown Prince maintained regular service on Lake Baikal, but it went down in 1860. Myasnokovs didn't have other ships, but the shipping company's activity continued on Lake Baikal, the Rivers Angara and Selenga. D.Е. Benardaki, a retired lieutenant, participant of Amur campaign, built two ships in Listvyanichnoe in 1858: the first was named for the governor-general - Muravjev-Amurskij, and he named the second ship after himself - Benardaki. The foundation of shipping company on Lake Baikal was the most important contribution to the economic developing of Siberia.

=== Development of ESINC after Myasnikov ===
The Ministry's Committee Regulations about the steam navigation on the Angara River was approved on 17 August 1885. Emperor Alexander III granted the privilege to the Irkutsk merchant A. M. Sibiryakov. This date is deemed to be the day of the establishment of the Eastern Siberian Inland Navigation Company. The building of motor ships was an important development in shipping history. The first motor ship in the world was built at the factory in Sormovsk in 1903. In 1905 the first ships on Lake Baikal were built — ferry «Baikal» and ice-breaker «Angara». The Soviet history of the Eastern-Siberian Inland Navigation Company began in 1918, when the Decree about fleet nationalization was passed. All ships of private companies were nationalized. One of the prominent revolutionaries, Lukas Mikhailovich Vlasov, led the first river transport organization in Eastern Siberia. In the 1930s the company's workers carried out the building program of fleet repairing bases. The Great Patriotic War frustrated the plans for river transport development. The Eastern-Siberian Inland Navigation Company was always the leader in cargo delivery to the North. In a short time six motor ships, 15 barges with carrying capacity of 1300 tons were built. The company's vessels had transported 840000 tons of cargo for the Baikal–Amur Mainline building. The 1960-70s were a very important stage in the technology and fleet reequipment. The stream vessels were replaced by motor ships.

=== Contemporary history of ESINC ===
The Eastern-Siberian Inland Navigation Company belongs to group of companies "Eastland" since 2001. This is a new stage in the company's development. Holding company Eastland was founded over 15 years ago. Sergei Eroshenko is its principal shareholder. ESINC is a stable profitable enterprise today: It reconstructs ships, and provides employment for the population. Most old ships are or will be reconstructed. The government shipbuilding and fleet innovation program functions 9 years in Russia. It includes not only the reconstruction of old ships, but also the building of new water transport on their basis. For example, the biggest ship on Baikal Imperia was built on the basis of an old towboat. Such floatels as Imperia are very popular among tourists now, because they combine at once transport and hotel with all kinds of services. It is a new stage in tourism development.

== Lake Baikal tourism ==
One of the most promising lines of development in water transport is the tourism industry. Today more than hundred ships carry tourists. This includes not only cruisers on Lake Baikal, but there are also a lot of trips on the Angara River and Irkutsk reservoir. Cruises, sometimes involving picnic or fourchette, are in popular demand. People take trips on the River Angara by river buses. The most popular directions on Lake Baikal are: Peschanaya Bay, Listvyanka, Bolshie Koty, Port Baikal to Circum Baikal Railway. Cruises around Lake Baikal are popular among people with certain interests, for example, fishing or diving, or people, who want to celebrate an event. This line is developing very actively – especially today, when tour operators begin to coordinate their actions with each other, to organize combined groups in different cities. There are also some problems, prevented from water tourism development on Lake Baikal. The main problem consists in fact, that vessel fleet is increasing but the number of berths in Listvyanka settlement – the starting point of majority of trips - remains unchanged. The region development and Lake Baikal tourism in particular, can change water routes, adapt them to touristic aims. Direction for the development, chosen by the Eastern-Siberian Inland Navigation Company as the most perspective, has a good effect on the company itself and on the region as a whole. The company elaborates new routes on Lake Baikal and River Angara. Baikal region was declared a UNESCO World Heritage Site in 1996. Tourist traffic increases every year, the quality of service improves too. The dippiest sea in the world and the Angara River – the biggest tributary of Yenisej- for a long time an integrated shipping system. Industry in Pribaikalye developed as a going concern only thanks to water ways. The through service of settlements on Baikal with centres of trade was necessary for economical upturn of thinly populated areas, rich in natural resources.

== Legislative and normative acts ==
Licensing system in inland water-ways of Russia was established during privatization of shipping companies, ports and repairing bases. There were the regulation and license services organized to protect shipping and to observe ecostandards during use of water transport. Today the Government Inland Water Fleet Service issues a license in the inland water transport. The first federal statute «About licensing of special kinds of activity» was passed on 16 September 1998. The main legislative acts are the statute «About inland water transport service in Department of Transport of Russian Federation» of 11 March 1998 and the Water Code of Russian Federation.
