= Yuri Vlasov =

Yuri Vlasov may refer to:

- Yury Vlasov (1935–2021), Soviet weightlifter and Russian politician
- Yuriy Vlasov (born 1970), Ukrainian freestyle swimmer
- Yurii Vlasov (born 1964), Russian-American engineer and scientist
- Yury Vlasov (politician) (1961–2019), Russian politician, first governor of Vladimir Oblast
- Jüri Vlassov, Estonian actor and musician
