= Artem Kulakovskyi =

Ukrainian footballer

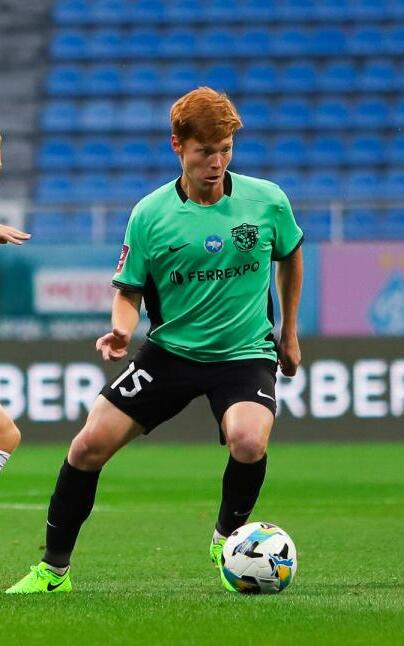

Personal information
- Full name: Artem Valeriyovych Kulakovskyi
- Date of birth: 11 February 2002 (age 24)
- Place of birth: Komsomolsk, Ukraine
- Height: 1.74 m (5 ft 8 1/2 in)
- Position: Midfielder

Team information
- Current team: Obolon Kyiv
- Number: 8

Youth career
- 2013–2017: Metalist Kharkiv
- 2017–2020: Dynamo Kyiv

Senior career*
Years	Team	Apps	(Gls)
2020–2025	Vorskla Poltava	15	(0)
2021–2022	→ Hirnyk-Sport Horishni Plavni (loan)	10	(0)
2023–2024	→ Oleksandriya (loan)	11	(1)
2024–2025	→ Vorskla-2 Poltava	11	(0)
2025–	Obolon Kyiv	17	(0)

International career^{‡}
2018	Ukraine U16	2	(0)
2019	Ukraine U17	2	(1)
2019	Ukraine U18	1	(0)
2022–	Ukraine U21	2	(0)
2024	Ukraine U23	1	(0)
- * Club domestic league appearances and goals as of 3 June 2026 ‡ National team caps and goals as of 25 March 2024

Artem Valeriyovych Kulakovskyi (Ukrainian: Артем Валерійович Кулаковський; born 11 February 2002) is a Ukrainian professional footballer who plays as a midfielder for Obolon Kyiv.

== Career ==
Kulakovskyi, who was born in a present day Horishni Plavni, is a product of Metalist Kharkiv and Dynamo Kyiv Youth Sportive School Systems.

In February 2020, he signed a contract with Vorskla Poltava and he made his debut for FC Vorskla main squad in a drawing away game against FC Lviv on 3 July 2020 in the Ukrainian Premier League.
