= Dmytriy Pavlish =

Ukrainian footballer

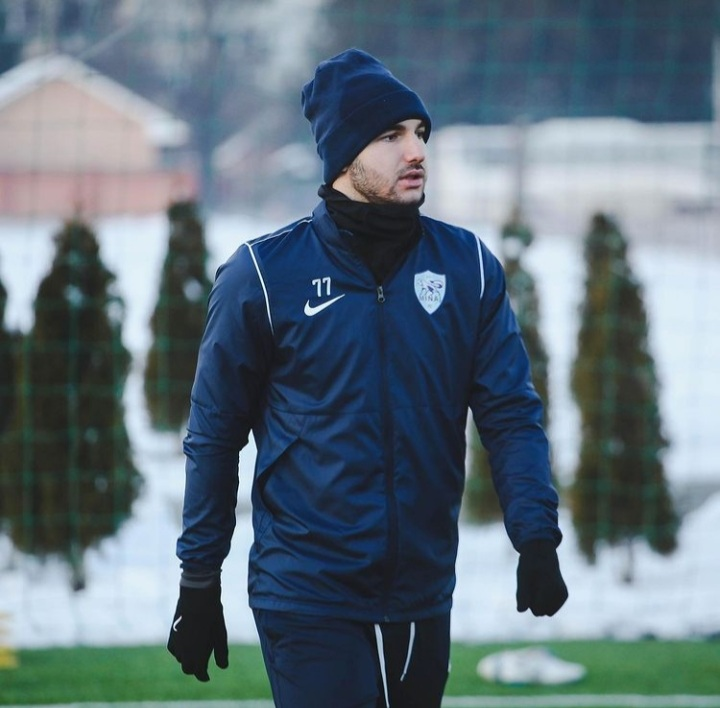

Personal information
- Full name: Dmytriy Vasylyovych Pavlish
- Date of birth: 30 September 1999 (age 27)
- Place of birth: Mukachevo, Ukraine
- Height: 1.86 m (6 ft 1 in)
- Position: Centre-back

Team information
- Current team: FSV Gräfinau-Angstedt
- Number: 23

Youth career
- 2010–2012: DYuSSh Mukachevo
- 2012–2013: SDYuSShOR Uzhhorod
- 2013–2016: Shakhtar Donetsk

Senior career*
Years	Team	Apps	(Gls)
2016–2021	Shakhtar Donetsk	0	(0)
2020–2021	→ Mynai (loan)	4	(0)
2021	→ Hirnyk-Sport Horishni Plavni (loan)	7	(0)
2022–2023	Mariupol	12	(1)
2023	Dainava	0	(0)
2024	Ravshan Kulob	2	(0)
2024–2025	Wilga Garwolin	9	(2)
2025–	FSV Gräfinau-Angstedt	13	(7)
- * Club domestic league appearances and goals as of 08:11, 23 June 2025 (UTC)

Dmytriy Vasylyovych Pavlish (Ukrainian: Дмитрій Васильович Павліш; born 30 September 1999) is a Ukrainian professional footballer who plays as a centre-back for German club FSV Gräfinau-Angstedt.

== Career ==
Born in Zakarpattia Oblast, Pavlish began his career in the local youth sportive schools, until his transfer to the FC Shakhtar youth sportive school in 2013.

He played in the Ukrainian Premier League Reserves and never made his debut for the senior Shakhtar Donetsk's squad. In August 2020 he signed one-year loan contract with the Ukrainian Premier League's debutant FC Mynai and made the debut for this team as a second half-time substituted player in a winning home match against FC Oleksandriya on 13 September 2020.
