= Dmitri Vlasov =

Russian footballer and coach

Personal information
- Full name: Dmitri Nikolayevich Vlasov
- Date of birth: 2 January 1973 (age 53)
- Place of birth: Moscow, Russian SFSR
- Height: 1.76 m (5 ft 9 in)
- Positions: Defender; midfielder

Youth career
- PFC CSKA Moscow

Senior career*
Years	Team	Apps	(Gls)
1990	PFC CSKA-2 Moscow	2	(0)
1992	PFC CSKA Moscow	0	(0)
1992	→ PFC CSKA-d Moscow	17	(0)
1993	FC Metallurg Magnitogorsk	18	(1)
1994	FC Dynamo-Gazovik Tyumen	11	(0)
1995–2000	FC Lokomotiv Nizhny Novgorod	134	(3)
2000	FC Fakel Voronezh	9	(0)
2001	FC Lokomotiv Nizhny Novgorod	23	(1)
2005	FC Titan Moscow	16	(0)

Managerial career
- 2004: FC Vidnoye (assistant)
- 2008: FC Dmitrov (administrator)
- 2009: FC Zelenograd (administrator)
- * Club domestic league appearances and goals

Dmitri Nikolayevich Vlasov (Russian: Дмитрий Николаевич Власов; born 2 January 1973) is a Russian professional football coach and a former player.

== Club career ==
He made his professional debut in the Soviet Second League B in 1990 for PFC CSKA-2 Moscow. He played 1 game in the UEFA Intertoto Cup 1997 for FC Lokomotiv Nizhny Novgorod.

== Personal life ==
He is the older brother of Vadim Vlasov.
