= Maksym Melnychuk =

Ukrainian footballer

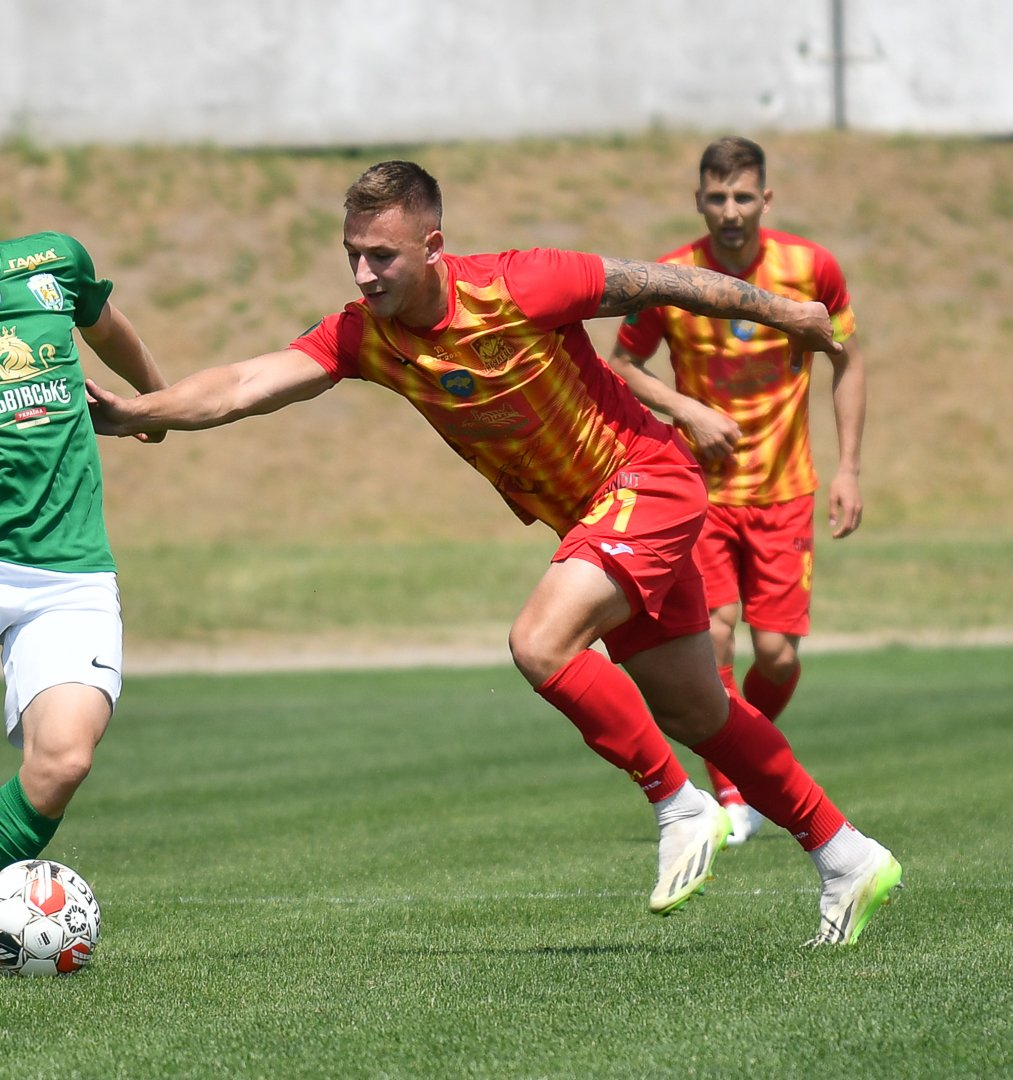

Personal information
- Full name: Maksym Oleksandrovych Melnychuk
- Date of birth: 18 September 1999 (age 27)
- Place of birth: Kyiv, Ukraine
- Height: 1.81 m (5 ft 11 in)
- Position: Defender

Team information
- Current team: Kudrivka
- Number: 91

Youth career
- 200?–2014: RVUFK Kyiv
- 2014–2018: Dynamo Kyiv

Senior career*
Years	Team	Apps	(Gls)
2018–2023	Vorskla Poltava	10	(0)
2020–2021	→ Chornomorets Odesa (loan)	16	(1)
2021–2022	→ Inhulets Petrove (loan)	4	(0)
2023–2024	Inhulets Petrove	45	(1)
2025–	Kudrivka	25	(0)

International career^{‡}
2014–2015	Ukraine U16	13	(0)
- * Club domestic league appearances and goals as of 19 November 2026 ‡ National team caps and goals as of 9 November 2019

Maksym Melnychuk (Ukrainian: Максим Олександрович Мельничук; born 18 September 1999) is a Ukrainian professional footballer who plays as a defender for Kudrivka in the Ukrainian First League.

== Career ==
Melnychuk is a product of the RVUFK and Dynamo Kyiv youth sportive schools.

In July 2018 he continued his career in the Ukrainian Premier League Reserves club FC Vorskla Poltava. And in September 2019 Melnychuk was promoted to the main-squad team of FC Vorskla in the Ukrainian Premier League. He made his debut as a start-squad player for Vorskla Poltava in the Ukrainian Premier League in a losing match against FC Olimpik Donetsk on 20 October 2019.

== International career ==
During 2014–2015 he was called up for the youth national representation under 16.
