= Vadim Vlasov =

Russian footballer

Personal information
- Full name: Vadim Nikolayevich Vlasov
- Date of birth: 19 December 1980 (age 45)
- Height: 1.90 m (6 ft 3 in)
- Position: Goalkeeper

Youth career
- PFC CSKA Moscow

Senior career*
Years	Team	Apps	(Gls)
1998–1999	FC Lokomotiv Nizhny Novgorod	2	(0)
2000	FC Dynamo Moscow	0	(0)
2000	→ FC Dynamo-d Moscow (loan)	1	(0)
2001	FC Lokomotiv Nizhny Novgorod	2	(0)

Managerial career
- 2008: FC Zelenograd (administrator)
- 2009: FC Zelenograd (senior administrator)
- * Club domestic league appearances and goals

Vadim Nikolayevich Vlasov (Russian: Вадим Николаевич Власов; born 19 December 1980) is a former Russian football player.

Vlasov played in the Russian Premier League with FC Lokomotiv Nizhny Novgorod.

He is a younger brother of Dmitri Vlasov.
