= Edin Šehić =

Bosnian footballer (born 1995)

Personal information
- Date of birth: 3 February 1995 (age 31)
- Place of birth: Zagreb, Croatia
- Height: 1.78 m (5 ft 10 in)
- Positions: Winger; full-back

Team information
- Current team: Igman Konjic
- Number: 29

Youth career
- 2000–2004: Dubrava
- 2004–2013: Zagreb

Senior career*
Years	Team	Apps	(Gls)
2013–2017	Zagreb	74	(11)
2015–2016	Zagreb II	2	(1)
2017–2018	Hajduk Split	15	(0)
2018	→ Rudar Velenje (loan)	16	(3)
2018	Hajduk Split II	4	(0)
2019–2020	Vorskla Poltava	20	(2)
2020	Rudeš	7	(0)
2021	ND Gorica	10	(0)
2021	Rudeš	2	(0)
2021–2023	Akritas Chlorakas	62	(1)
2023–2024	Rudeš	14	(0)
2024–	Igman Konjic	3	(0)

International career
2013	Bosnia and Herzegovina U18	2	(0)
2014	Bosnia and Herzegovina U21	1	(0)
- * Club domestic league appearances and goals as of 23 August 2024

Edin Šehić (Bosnian pronunciation: [ʃěːxitɕ]; born 3 February 1995) is a Bosnian footballer who plays as a winger for Bosnian Premier League club Igman Konjic.

== Club career ==
Although Šehić's parents hail from the Bosnian city of Zavidovići, he was born in the Croatian city of Zagreb. His father, Jusuf played youth football for Krivaja Zavidovići.

From the age of five, Šehić started training with Dubrava, before joining the youth setup of NK Zagreb at the age of nine. Three years later, at the age of 12, he became the youngest footballer to sign a scholarship contract for NK Zagreb.

In 2013, Šehić was promoted to the first team and signed a seven-year deal. He scored his first goal in a 4–3 win against Segesta. Although the club was relegated from the first tier in 2015–16, he continued to play with the club. He scored a hat-trick in the first league match against Rudeš. He contributed with ten goals in the season, playing as an attacker in the later half of the season.

On 22 April 2017, Šehić moved to Hajduk Split, after agreeing to a three-year deal. On 16 July, he made his debut in a 1–1 draw against Lokomotiva. In August, he made his UEFA Europa League debut in a 2–0 victory against Danish club Brøndby IF. Coming on as a 75th-minute substitute for Zvonimir Kožulj, Sehić received a yellow card twelve minutes later.

On 9 January 2019, Šehić terminated his contract with the club on mutual consent. On 22 January 2019, he signed for Ukrainian Premier League club Vorskla Poltava.

In August 2021, Šehić moved to the Cypriot Second Division side Akritas Chlorakas following a month-long stint at NK Rudeš. There, he helped the club achieve promotion, capping 28 times in the first season at the club.

== International career ==
Šehić is a Bosnian-Herzegovinian youth international and has played for the under-18 team and under-21 team.

== Career statistics ==
=== Club ===
As of match played on 4 November 2018

Club	Season	League			Cup		Continental		Total	
Club	Season	Division	Apps	Goals	Apps	Goals	Apps	Goals	Apps	Goals
Zagreb	2013–14	Druga HNL	22	1	1	0	—		23	1
Zagreb	2014–15	Prva HNL	9	0	1	0	—		10	0
Zagreb	2015–16	Prva HNL	19	0	3	0	—		22	0
Zagreb	2016–17	Druga HNL	23	10	1	0	—		24	10
Zagreb	Total		73	11	6	0	—		79	11
Hajduk Split	2017–18	Prva HNL	12	0	2	0	1 (Note: Appearances in UEFA Europa League)	0	15	0
Hajduk Split	2018–19	Prva HNL	3	0	1	0	0	0	4	0
Hajduk Split	Total		15	0	3	0	1	0	19	0
Rudar Velenje (loan)	2017–18	Slovenian PrvaLiga	16	3	0	0	—		16	3
Career total			104	14	9	0	1	0	114	14

== Personal life ==
While watching the final of the 2013 Croatian Football Cup between Hajduk Split and Lokomotiva, Šehić, who is a Hajduk fan, was attacked.
