= Viktor Vlasov =

Viktor Vlasov may refer to:

- Viktor Vlasov (basketball) (1925–2002), Russian basketball player
- Viktor Vlasov (sport shooter) (born 1951), former Soviet sport shooter
