= Andriy Stryzhak (footballer) =

Ukrainian footballer

Personal information
- Full name: Andriy Vitaliyovych Stryzhak
- Date of birth: 22 October 1999 (age 27)
- Place of birth: Novovolynsk, Ukraine
- Height: 1.87 m (6 ft 2 in)
- Position: Midfielder

Team information
- Current team: Lovćen
- Number: 99

Youth career
- 2012–2016: Dynamo Kyiv
- 2016–2017: Arsenal Kyiv

Senior career*
Years	Team	Apps	(Gls)
2017–2018	Shakhtar Donetsk	0	(0)
2018–2019	Arsenal Kyiv	5	(0)
2019	Vorskla Poltava	5	(0)
2020	Chornomorets Odesa	4	(0)
2020	Hirnyk-Sport Horishni Plavni	1	(0)
2021–2022	Metalist Kharkiv	4	(0)
2021	→ Olimpik Donetsk (loan)	9	(0)
2022	Međimurje	0	(0)
2022–2023	Gabala	6	(0)
2024	HAŠK Zagreb		
2024–2025	Grbalj	22	(3)
2025–	Lovćen	15	(3)
- * Club domestic league appearances and goals as of 18 June 2026

Andriy Vitaliyovych Stryzhak (Ukrainian: Андрій Віталійович Стрижак; born 22 October 1999) is a Ukrainian professional footballer who plays as a midfielder for Montenegrin second-tier club Lovćen.

== Career ==
=== Early years ===
Stryzhak is a product of Dynamo Kyiv academy.

=== Arsenal Kyiv ===
He made his debut in the Ukrainian Premier League while playing for Arsenal Kyiv in a losing home game against Lviv on 22 July 2018.

=== Gabala ===
On 10 August 2022, Gabala announced the signing of Stryzhak. On 14 June 2023, Gabala confirmed the departure of Stryzhak following the expiration of his contract.

== Career statistics ==
=== Club ===
As of match played 17 March 2023

Appearances and goals by club, season and competition
Club	Season	League			National Cup		Continental		Other		Total	
Club	Season	Division	Apps	Goals	Apps	Goals	Apps	Goals	Apps	Goals	Apps	Goals
Gabala	2022–23	Azerbaijan Premier League	6	0	1	0	0 (Note: Appearances in the UEFA Europa Conference League)	0	-		7	0
Career total			6	0	1	0	0	0	-	-	7	0
