= Daniil Syemilyet =

Ukrainian footballer

Personal information
- Full name: Daniil Andriyovych Syemilyet
- Date of birth: 7 March 2001 (age 25)
- Place of birth: Zhytomyr, Ukraine
- Height: 1.75 m (5 ft 9 in)
- Position: Midfielder

Team information
- Current team: Vorskla Poltava
- Number: 52

Youth career
- 2014–2015: Metalist Kharkiv
- 2015–2016: Youth Sportive School Vinnytsia
- 2016–2020: Vorskla Poltava

Senior career*
Years	Team	Apps	(Gls)
2020–	Vorskla Poltava	5	(0)
- * Club domestic league appearances and goals as of 23 September 2021

Daniil Andriyovych Syemilyet (Ukrainian: Даніїл Андрійович Сємілєт; born 7 March 2001) is a Ukrainian professional footballer who plays as a midfielder for Vorskla Poltava in the Ukrainian Premier League.

== Career ==
Syemilyet is a product of Metalist Kharkiv, Youth Sportive School Vinnytsia and Vorskla Poltava systems.

In summer 2020 he was promoted to the main squad of Vorskla Poltava. He made his debut as a start squad player for Vorskla Poltava in the Ukrainian Premier League in an away draw match against FC Lviv on 3 July 2020.
