= Valeriy Dubko =

Ukrainian footballer

Personal information
- Full name: Valeriy Viktorovych Dubko
- Date of birth: 22 March 2001 (age 25)
- Place of birth: Donetsk, Ukraine
- Height: 1.81 m (5 ft 11 in)
- Position: Centre-back

Team information
- Current team: Metalist 1925 Kharkiv
- Number: 37

Youth career
- 2013–2014: Azovstal-2 Mariupol
- 2014–2016: Shakhtar Donetsk
- 2016–2018: Arsenal Kyiv

Senior career*
Years	Team	Apps	(Gls)
2018–2022	Vorskla Poltava	6	(0)
2021–2022	→ Chornomorets Odesa (loan)	18	(0)
2022	Zorya Luhansk	0	(0)
2022–2023	Dender	5	(0)
2023–2025	Obolon Kyiv	62	(1)
2026–	Metalist 1925 Kharkiv	5	(0)

International career^{‡}
2021–2022	Ukraine U21	2	(0)
- * Club domestic league appearances and goals as of 3 June 2026 ‡ National team caps and goals as of 1 September 2023

Valeriy Viktorovych Dubko (Ukrainian: Валерій Вікторович Дубко; born 22 March 2001) is a Ukrainian professional footballer who plays as a centre-back for Metalist 1925 Kharkiv.

== Career ==
Born in Donetsk, Dubko is a product of Azovstal-2 Mariupol and Shakhtar Donetsk youth sportive school systems.

In August 2018, he was signed by Vorskla Poltava. He made his debut as a second half-time substituted player for Vorskla Poltava in the Ukrainian Premier League in a home winning match against Dnipro-1 on 19 June 2020.
