= Radion Posyevkin =

Ukrainian footballer

Personal information
- Full name: Radion Dmytrovych Posyevkin
- Date of birth: 18 May 2001 (age 25)
- Place of birth: Kremenchuk, Ukraine
- Height: 1.77 m (5 ft 9 1/2 in)
- Position: Midfielder

Team information
- Current team: Nyva Ternopil
- Number: 18

Youth career
- 2014–2018: Kremin Kremenchuk
- 2017: → Dynamo Kyiv (loan)

Senior career*
Years	Team	Apps	(Gls)
2018–2022	Vorskla Poltava	3	(0)
2021–2022	→ Hirnyk-Sport Horishni Plavni (loan)	4	(0)
2022–2024	Hirnyk-Sport Horishni Plavni	40	(5)
2024–	Nyva Ternopil	34	(2)

International career^{‡}
2016–2017	Ukraine U16	2	(0)
2019	Ukraine U19	3	(0)
- * Club domestic league appearances and goals as of 4 June 2026 ‡ National team caps and goals as of 16 August 2021

Radion Dmytrovych Posyevkin (Ukrainian: Радіон Дмитрович Посєвкін; born 18 May 2001) is a Ukrainian professional football midfielder who plays for Nyva Ternopil.

== Career ==
Born in Poltava Oblast, Posyevkin is a product of local Kremin Kremenchuk youth sportive school system.

In August 2018 he was signed by Vorskla Poltava. He made his debut as a second half-time substituted player for Vorskla Poltava in the Ukrainian Premier League in an away drawing match against FC Lviv on 3 July 2020.

On 31 August 2024, Posyevkin signed with Nyva Ternopil.
