= Volodymyr Bayenko =

Ukrainian footballer

Personal information
- Full name: Volodymyr Volodymyrovych Bayenko
- Date of birth: 9 February 1990 (age 36)
- Place of birth: Komsomolske, Ukrainian SSR
- Height: 1.85 m (6 ft 1 in)
- Position: Centre back

Youth career
- 2003–2004: Shakhtar Donetsk
- 2005–2007: Olimpik Donetsk

Senior career*
Years	Team	Apps	(Gls)
2011–2012	Stal Dniprodzerzhynsk	0	(0)
2012–2013	Makiivvuhillia Makiivka	27	(2)
2014–2016	Hirnyk Kryvyi Rih	63	(9)
2016	Zirka Kropyvnytskyi	14	(0)
2017	Buxoro	27	(3)
2018	Riga	23	(5)
2019	Buxoro	10	(1)
2019–2020	Vorskla Poltava	15	(1)
2021	FCI Levadia	11	(2)
- * Club domestic league appearances and goals as of 17 June 2021

Volodymyr Bayenko (Ukrainian: Володимир Володимирович Баєнко; born 9 February 1990) is a former professional Ukrainian football defender.

== Career ==
Bayenko is a product of the FC Shakhtar and FC Olimpik Youth Sportive School Systems in Donetsk. He spent time in the different Ukrainian Second League and Ukrainian First League clubs, but in summer 2016 signed a contract with FC Zirka in the Ukrainian Premier League.

== Honours ==
Levadia Tallinn

- Meistriliiga: 2021

Riga

- Latvian Higher League: 2018
- Latvian Football Cup: 2018

Zirka Kropyvnytsky

- Ukrainian First League:2016

Vorskla Poltava

- Ukrainian Cup: Runners-up 2019–20
