= Illya Hadzhuk =

Ukrainian footballer

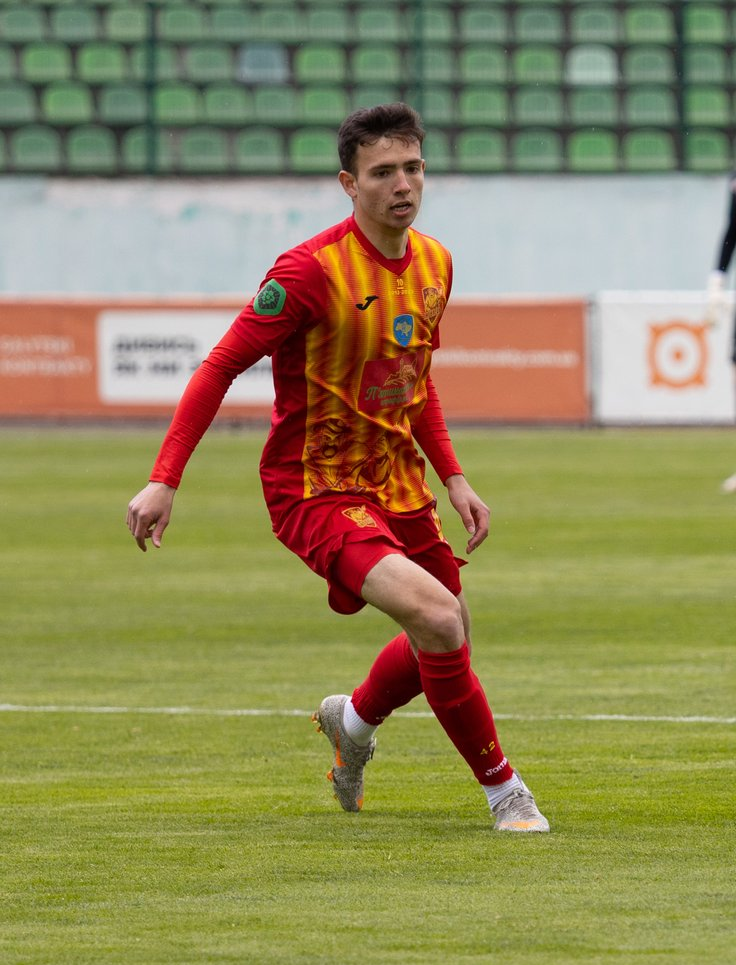

Personal information
- Full name: Illya Petrovych Hadzhuk
- Date of birth: 2 August 2002 (age 24)
- Place of birth: Brovary, Ukraine
- Height: 1.83 m (6 ft 0 in)
- Position: Midfielder

Team information
- Current team: Inhulets Petrove
- Number: 42

Youth career
- 2014–2015: Kaskad Brovary
- 2015–2018: Knyazha Shchaslyve
- 2019–2020: Vorskla Poltava

Senior career*
Years	Team	Apps	(Gls)
2019	DYuFSh Vorskla Poltava	3	(0)
2020–2021	Vorskla Poltava	5	(0)
2021–2022	Dynamo Kyiv	0	(0)
2022	Chornomorets Odesa	0	(0)
2023–	Inhulets Petrove	53	(3)
- * Club domestic league appearances and goals as of 24 December 2025

Illya Petrovych Hadzhuk (Ukrainian: Ілля Петрович Гаджук; born 2 August 2002) is a Ukrainian professional footballer who plays as a midfielder for Inhulets Petrove.

== Career ==
Born in Brovary, Hadzhuk spent time with several different youth academies. In April 2019 he was signed by Vorskla Poltava.

Hadzhuk made his debut as a substitute for Vorskla Poltava in a home match against Olimpik Donetsk on 28 June 2020.
