= Jüri Vlassov =

Estonian singer and actor (born 1948)

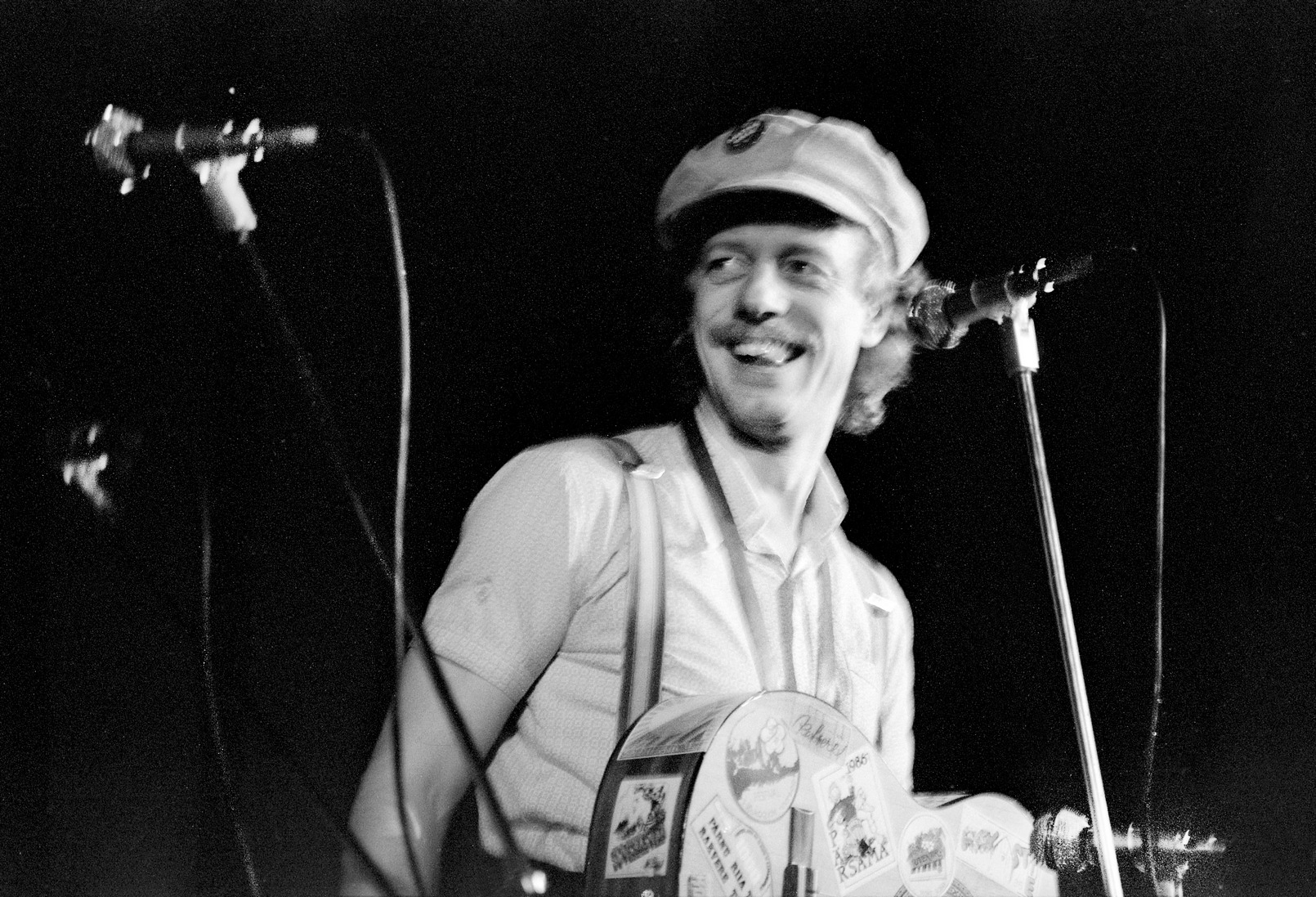
Vlassov in 1987

Jüri Vlassov (born 23 April 1948) is an Estonian actor and singer.

From 1969 to 1973 he worked at the Endla Theatre, Pärnu. In 1974 he had become an actor and also created music for theatre productions. He also performed in TV fills and series. Vlassov didn't have any professional theatric education. In 2014 his employment contract with Endla ended over 45 years. He was offered half-time job, to which he disagreed.

== Golden Trio ==
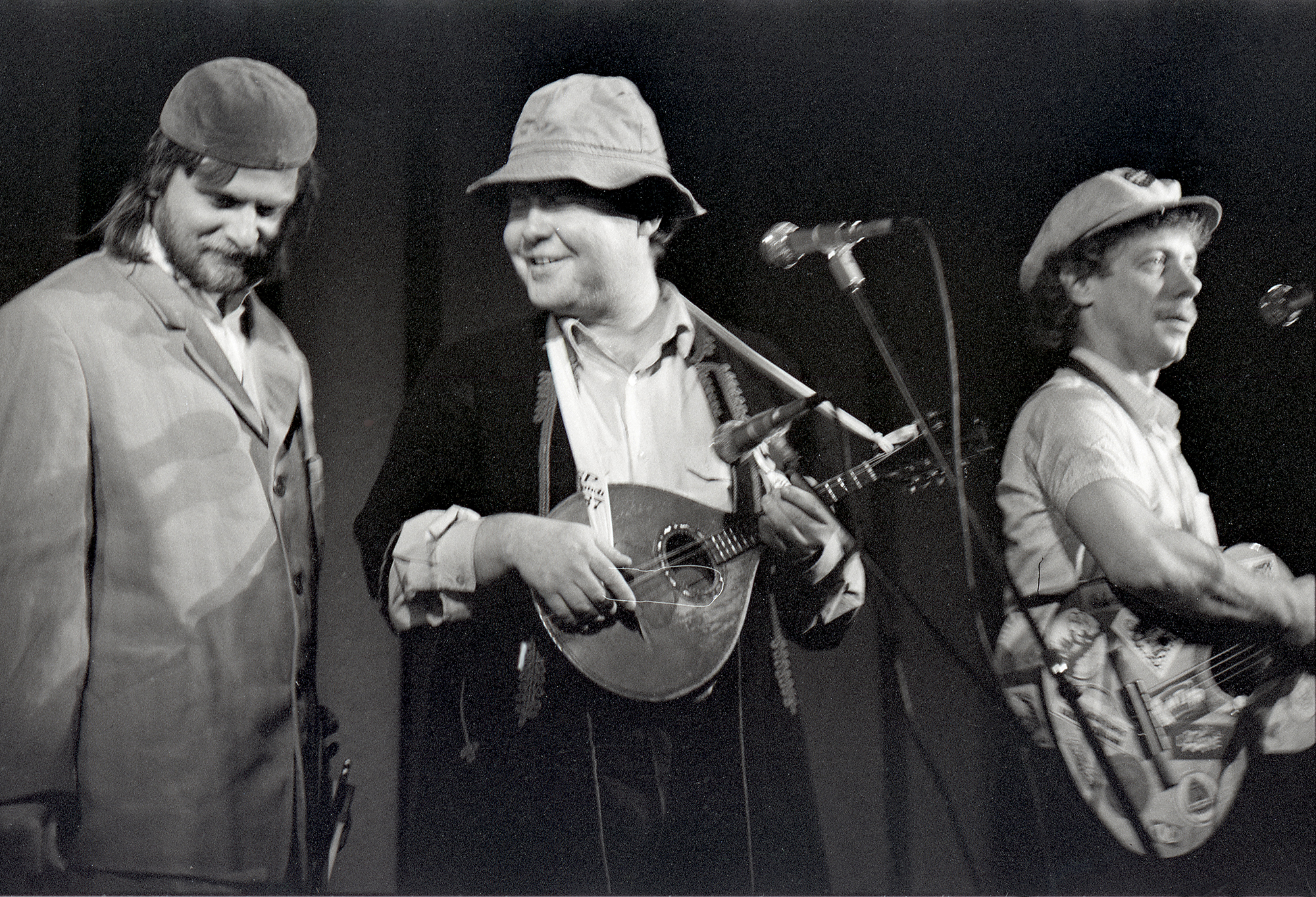
Golden Trio, 1987

In 1974, he together with Mihkel Smeljanski founded the band Hõbedased kaksikud ("Silver Twins"), which in 1975 had become Kuldne Trio ("Golden Trio"), which existed for over 45 years, until the death of Smeljanski, and was well known in the whole Estonia.

In 1995, he together with Smeljanski wrote a book Devil Dozen's Homework on the topic "Golden Trio" (Kuraditosin kodukirjandit teemal "Kuldne Trio"), reprinted as Kuldse Trio in 2008. In 2017, Endla Theatre staged the play "Pao-pao. The stories of the Golden Trio" („Pao-pao. Kuldse Trio lood“).

== Awards ==
- 2018: Order of Merit of Pärnu, "for enriching cultural life as an actor and musician"
- 2020: Order of the White Star V class (awarded together with Mihkel Smeljanski)
- 2024: Pärnu vapimärk "for the long-term enrichment of the cultural life of the city of Pärnu and Estonian theater art"
