= Yuriy Kozyrenko =

Ukrainian footballer

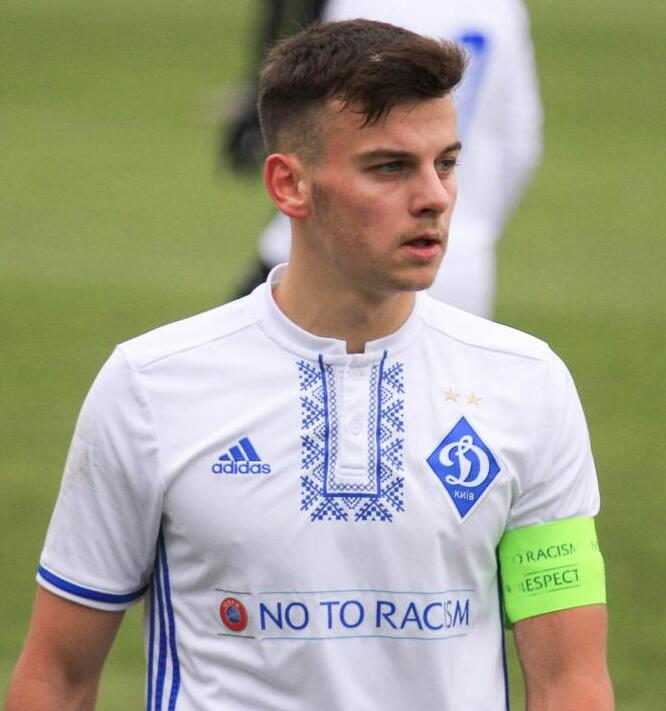

Personal information
- Full name: Yuriy Serhiyovych Kozyrenko
- Date of birth: 27 November 1999 (age 26)
- Place of birth: Kostopil, Ukraine
- Height: 1.72 m (5 ft 8 in)
- Position: Striker

Team information
- Current team: Podillya Khmelnytskyi
- Number: 17

Youth career
- 200?–2014: Kolyps-Shturm Kostopil
- 2014–2018: Dynamo Kyiv

Senior career*
Years	Team	Apps	(Gls)
2018–2023	Vorskla Poltava	13	(0)
2020	→ Hirnyk-Sport Horishni Plavni (loan)	9	(3)
2021–2022	→ Isloch Minsk Raion (loan)	41	(3)
2023–2024	Inhulets Petrove	47	(2)
2025	UCSA Tarasivka	8	(0)
2025–	Podillya Khmelnytskyi	12	(0)

International career^{‡}
2016	Ukraine U17	5	(0)
2017	Ukraine U18	2	(0)
2017–2018	Ukraine U19	4	(0)
2019	Ukraine U20	1	(0)
- * Club domestic league appearances and goals as of 27 December 2025 ‡ National team caps and goals as of 3 October 2020

Yuriy Serhiyovych Kozyrenko (Ukrainian: Юрій Сергійович Козиренко; born 27 November 1999) is a Ukrainian professional footballer who plays as a striker for Podillya Khmelnytskyi.

== Career ==
In August 2018 he signed contract with Vorskla Poltava and he made his debut for FC Vorskla in a winning game against FC Kolos Kovalivka on 24 August 2019 in the Ukrainian Premier League.
