= Luizão (footballer, born 1998) =

Brazilian footballer

Personal information
- Full name: Luiz Gustavo Novaes Palhares
- Date of birth: 20 February 1998 (age 28)
- Place of birth: São Paulo, Brazil
- Height: 1.84 m (6 ft 0 in)
- Position: Defensive midfielder

Team information
- Current team: CRB
- Number: 50

Youth career
- 2013–2017: São Paulo

Senior career*
| Years | Team | Apps | (Gls) |
| 2017–2020 | Porto B | 64 | (3) |
| 2019–2020 | → Vorskla Poltava (loan) | 20 | (1) |
| 2021–2022 | Vorskla Poltava | 12 | (0) |
| 2021–2022 | → Bahia (loan) | 7 | (0) |
| 2022–2025 | Radomiak Radom | 57 | (0) |
| 2025 | Atlético Goianiense | 31 | (2) |
| 2026– | CRB | 21 | (0) |
- * Club domestic league appearances and goals as of 16 November 2026

Luiz Gustavo Novaes Palhares (born 20 February 1998), commonly known as Luizão, is a Brazilian professional footballer who plays as a defensive midfielder for Brazilian club CRB.

== Club career ==
Luizão transferred from São Paulo to Porto in July 2017.

In 2019, Luizão was sent on loan to Vorskla Poltava.

In September 2021, Luizão joined Bahia on loan from Vorskla, where he played six matches in the Campeonato Brasileiro Série A. His contract with Bahia, due to expire in December 2022, was terminated in February 2022.

On 18 February 2022, Luizão signed a deal with Polish club Radomiak Radom until 30 June 2025. On 4 January 2025, he terminated his contract by mutual consent, subsequently signing with Atlético Goianiense.
