= Oleh Vlasov =

Ukrainian footballer

Personal information
- Full name: Oleh Oleksandrovych Vlasov
- Date of birth: 25 October 2002 (age 24)
- Place of birth: Chernivtsi, Ukraine
- Height: 1.80 m (5 ft 11 in)
- Position: Midfielder

Youth career
- 2015–2018: Bukovyna Chernivtsi
- 2019: Youth Sportive School Schaslyve
- 2019–2020: Vorskla Poltava

Senior career*
Years	Team	Apps	(Gls)
2020–2021	Vorskla Poltava	5	(0)
2021–2022	Dynamo Kyiv	0	(0)
2023–2024	LKS Czeluśnica	7	(1)
2024	Spartak Myjava	10	(0)
2024	Rimavská Sobota		
2025–2026	Hetman Zamość	3	(0)
- * Club domestic league appearances and goals as of 23:44, 1 February 2026 (UTC)

Oleh Oleksandrovych Vlasov (Ukrainian: Олег Олександрович Власов; born 25 October 2002) is a Ukrainian professional footballer who plays as a midfielder.

== Career ==
Vlasov is a product of FC Bukovyna Chernivtsi's youth system. His first trainer was Andriy Lakhnyuk. In the summer of 2019, he was transferred to Vorskla Poltava.

He made his Ukrainian Premier League debut for Vorskla as a second-half substitute in a home draw match against Olimpik Donetsk on 28 June 2020.
