= 2020–21 FC Lviv season =

FC Lviv
2020–21 season
- President: Bohdan Kopytko
- Manager: Giorgi Tsetsadze (until 24 October 2020); Vitaliy Shumskyi (since 28 October 2020 until 1 March 2021); Anatoliy Bezsmertnyi (since 2 March 2021)
- Stadium: Arena Lviv
- Ukrainian Premier League: 2020–21 Ukrainian Premier League
- Ukrainian Cup: Round of 32 (1/16)
- Top goalscorer: League: Alvaro, Nazariy Nych (4); All: Alvaro, Nazariy Nych (4)
- Highest home attendance: 6,973 (vs Dynamo Kyiv, 28 February 2021)
- Lowest home attendance: 0
- Average home league attendance: 1,047

The 2020–21 season was 4th season in the top Ukrainian football league for FC Lviv. Lviv competed in Premier League and Ukrainian Cup.

== Players ==
=== Squad information ===
As of 30 June 2021

Squad no.	Name	Nationality	Position	Date of birth (age)
Goalkeepers
12	Orest Kostyk ^{List B}	(Ukraine)	GK	16 April 1999 (aged 22)
31	Oleksandr Ilyuschenkov	(Ukraine)	GK	23 March 1990 (aged 31)
Defenders
2	Ivan Lobay	(Ukraine)	DF	21 May 1996 (aged 25)
4	Maksym Komarets ^{List B}	(Ukraine)	DF	23 May 2002 (aged 19)
14	Maksym Brama ^{List B}	(Ukraine)	DF	1 February 2002 (aged 19)
22	Enes Mahmutovic ^{List B}	(Luxembourg)	DF	22 May 1997 (aged 24)
27	Andriy Busko	(Ukraine)	DF	20 May 1997 (aged 24)
35	Oleksandr Savoshko	(Ukraine)	DF	22 September 1998 (aged 22)
99	Maroine Mihoubi ^{List B}	(France) (Tunisia)	DF	26 July 1999 (aged 21)
	Oleh Alfyorov ^{List B}	(Ukraine)	DF	25 June 2003 (aged 18)
	Yevhen Oberman ^{List B}	(Ukraine)	DF	20 October 2001 (aged 19)
Midfielders
5	Oleksiy Dovhyi	(Ukraine)	MF	2 November 1989 (aged 31)
7	China	(Brazil)	MF	2 August 1996 (aged 24)
8	Ivan Brikner	(Ukraine)	MF	30 June 1993 (aged 28)
9	Donatas Kazlauskas	(Lithuania)	MF	31 March 1994 (aged 27)
15	Borys Krushynskyi ^{List B}	(Ukraine)	MF	10 May 2002 (aged 19)
16	Serhiy Topchiy ^{List B}	(Ukraine)	MF	10 July 2001 (aged 19)
18	Welves ^{List B}	(Brazil)	MF	24 November 2000 (aged 20)
20	Lautaro Novach	(Argentina) (Italy)	MF	15 January 1998 (aged 23)
21	Oleksandr Romanchuk ^{List B}	(Ukraine)	MF	16 December 1999 (aged 21)
24	Volodymyr Yakimets	(Ukraine)	MF	3 March 1998 (aged 23)
26	Maksym Khimchak ^{List B}	(Ukraine)	MF	13 February 2000 (aged 21)
47	Maksym Hrysyo	(Ukraine)	MF	14 May 1996 (aged 25)
55	Dmytro Penteleychuk ^{List B}	(Ukraine)	MF	9 August 2000 (aged 20)
70	Ostap Malashevskyi ^{List B}	(Ukraine)	MF	25 January 1999 (aged 22)
96	Rafael Sabino	(Brazil)	MF	17 June 1996 (aged 25)
98	Dmytro Semeniv	(Ukraine)	MF	24 June 1998 (aged 23)
	Ihor Bekerskyi ^{List B}	(Ukraine)	MF	26 April 2002 (aged 19)
	Stanislav Demkiv ^{List B}	(Ukraine)	MF	10 May 2000 (aged 21)
	Maksym Mudryi ^{List B}	(Ukraine)	MF	5 May 2003 (aged 18)
Forwards
10	Alvaro	(Brazil)	FW	10 March 1995 (aged 26)
13	Nazariy Nych ^{List B}	(Ukraine)	FW	19 February 1999 (aged 22)
19	Renan de Oliveira	(Brazil)	FW	8 May 1997 (aged 24)
25	Frane Čirjak	(Croatia)	FW	23 June 1995 (aged 26)
29	Artur Remenyak ^{List B}	(Ukraine)	FW	9 August 2000 (aged 20)
30	Ernest Antwi	(Ghana)	FW	9 September 1995 (aged 25)
45	Yuriy Zakharkiv	(Ukraine)	FW	21 March 1996 (aged 25)
	Artur-Bohdan Shuta ^{List B}	(Ukraine)	FW	14 March 2001 (aged 20)

== Transfers ==
=== In ===
Date	Pos.	Player	Age	Moving from	Type	Fee	Source
Summer
20 August 2020	MF	(Estonia) Mihkel Ainsalu	24	(Estonia) Flora Tallinn	Transfer	Undisclosed	
21 August 2020	DF	(Croatia) Maks Čelić	24	(Croatia) HNK Gorica	Transfer	Undisclosed	
22 August 2020	DF	(Luxembourg) Enes Mahmutovic	23	(England) Middlesbrough	Transfer	Free	
27 August 2020	GK	(Ukraine) Serhiy Litovchenko	32	(Ukraine) Volyn Lutsk	Transfer	Undisclosed	
27 August 2020	DF	(Ukraine) Oleksandr Romanchuk	20	(Ukraine) Dynamo Kyiv	Transfer	Undisclosed	
1 September 2020	DF	(France) Maroine Mihoubi	21	(France) Aubagne	Transfer	Undisclosed	
4 September 2020	MF	(Ukraine) Ihor Koshman	25	(Georgia (country)) Shevardeni-1906 Tbilisi	Transfer	Undisclosed	
10 September 2020	MF	(Ukraine) Maksym Hrysyo	24	(Ukraine) FC Cherkashchyna	Transfer	Undisclosed	
25 September 2020	MF	(Lithuania) Donatas Kazlauskas	26	(Lithuania) Riteriai	Transfer	Undisclosed	
2 October 2020	FW	(Croatia) Frane Čirjak	25	(Bosnia and Herzegovina) Zrinjski Mostar	Transfer	Undisclosed	
12 October 2020	FW	(Ghana) Ernest Antwi	25	(Ukraine) Rukh Lviv	Transfer	Free	
30 October 2020	MF	(Ukraine) Volodymyr Yakimets	25	(Ukraine) Karpaty Lviv	Transfer	Free	
17 November 2020	FW	(Ukraine) Yuriy Zakharkiv	24	(Latvia) Jelgava	Transfer	Free	
Winter
10 January 2021	DF	(Ukraine) Ivan Lobay	24	(Estonia) Nõmme Kalju	Transfer	Free	
18 January 2021	MF	(Ukraine) Ivan Brikner	27	(Ukraine) Rukh Lviv	Transfer	Free	
23 January 2021	GK	(Ukraine) Oleksandr Ilyuschenkov	30	Unattached	Transfer	Free	
26 January 2021	MF	(Ukraine) Oleksiy Dovhyi	31	(Ukraine) FC Oleksandriya	Transfer	Free	
9 February 2021	MF	(Ukraine) Dmytro Semeniv	22	(Ukraine) Hirnyk-Sport Horishni Plavni	Transfer	Free	
13 April 2021	MF	(Argentina) Lautaro Novach	23	(Argentina) Quilmes	Transfer	Free	
31 December 2020	MF	(Brazil) Alvaro	25	(Azerbaijan) Keşla	Loan return		
31 December 2020	MF	(Brazil) Lipe Veloso	23	(Belarus) Torpedo-BelAZ Zhodino	Loan return		
31 December 2020	MF	(Brazil) Pedro Vitor	22	(Finland) Kuopion Palloseura	Loan return		
31 December 2020	FW	(Brazil) Pernambuco	22	(Georgia (country)) Dinamo Tbilisi	Loan return		
31 December 2020	FW	(Brazil) Renan de Oliveira	23	(Portugal) Gil Vicente	Loan return		

=== Out ===
Date	Pos.	Player	Age	Moving to	Type	Fee	Source
Summer
31 July 2020	DF	(Ukraine) Anton Bratkov	27	Unattached	Transfer	Free	
31 July 2020	DF	(Brazil) Cleber	21	Unattached	Transfer	Free	
31 July 2020	MF	(Brazil) Araujo	22	Unattached	Transfer	Free	
31 July 2020	MF	(Ukraine) Mykyta Khodakovskyi	23	Unattached	Transfer	Free	
31 July 2020	MF	(Ukraine) Artem Nedolya	26	Unattached	Transfer	Free	
2 August 2020	DF	(Ukraine) Ihor Honchar	27	(Armenia) Alashkert	Transfer	Free	
10 August 2020	DF	(Ukraine) Mykyta Tatarkov	25	(Ukraine) Vorskla Poltava	Transfer	Undisclosed	
12 August 2020	GK	(Ukraine) Bohdan Sarnavskyi	25	(Ukraine) SC Dnipro-1	Transfer	Undisclosed	
5 September 2020	DF	(Ukraine) Serhiy Lyulka	30	(Ukraine) Metal Kharkiv	Transfer	Free	
10 September 2020	DF	(Ukraine) Vladyslav Pryimak	23	(Ukraine) Volyn Lutsk	Transfer	Free	
20 October 2020	MF	(Brazil) Jonatan Lima	28	(Ukraine) Kremin Kremenchuk	Transfer	Free	
21 October 2020	DF	(France) Joël Bopesu	25	(France) Canet Roussillon	Transfer	Free	
27 October 2020	DF	(Ukraine) Serhiy Borzenko	34	Unattached	Transfer	Free	
31 October 2020	GK	(Ukraine) Serhiy Litovchenko	33	Unattached	Transfer	Free	
6 November 2020	FW	(Brazil) Matheus Iacovelli	22	(Brazil) Betim	Transfer	Free	
10 September 2020	MF	(Brazil) Alvaro	25	(Azerbaijan) Keşla	Loan		
10 September 2020	FW	(Brazil) Renan de Oliveira	23	(Portugal) Gil Vicente	Loan		
Winter
31 December 2020	MF	(Ukraine) Yaroslav Bohunov	27	Disqualified	Transfer	Free	
15 January 2021	DF	(Ukraine) Oleksandr Savoshko	22	(Ukraine) Veres Rivne	Transfer	Free	
19 January 2021	MF	(Ukraine) Yehor Klymenchuk	23	Ararat-Armenia	Transfer	Free	
January 2021	DF	(Croatia) Maks Čelić	24	(Croatia) NK Varaždin	Transfer	Free	
1 February 2021	GK	(Ukraine) Herman Penkov	26	(Armenia) Pyunik Yerevan	Transfer	Free	
25 February 2021	MF	(Estonia) Mihkel Ainsalu	24	(Denmark) FC Helsingør	Transfer	Free	
27 February 2021	MF	(Brazil) Pedro Vitor	22	(Brazil) Azuriz	Transfer	Free	
2 March 2021	DF	(Ukraine) Andriy Vychizhanin	21	(Ukraine) Karpaty Halych	Transfer / Loan /		
4 March 2021	MF	(Brazil) Lipe Veloso	23	(Latvia) Riga	Transfer	Undisclosed	
17 March 2021	MF	(Ukraine) Ihor Koshman	25	(Estonia) Tallinna JK Legion	Transfer	Free	
31 December 2020	DF	(Ukraine) Yuriy Kravchuk	26	(Ukraine) Hirnyk-Sport Horishni Plavni	Loan return		
30 January 2021	FW	(Brazil) Filipe Pachtmann	20	(Azerbaijan) Zira FK	Loan		
27 March 2021	FW	(Brazil) Pernambuco	20	(Norway) Bodø/Glimt	Loan		

== Pre-season and friendlies ==
5 August 2020 Friendly	FC Lviv (Ukraine)	1–1	(Ukraine) Polissya Zhytomyr	Lviv
17:00 EEST (UTC+03:00)	Bohunov 20' (pen.)	Report	Halenko 78'	Stadium: Ukraina Stadium; Attendance: 0

8 August 2020 Friendly	FC Lviv (Ukraine)	2–2	(Ukraine) Nyva Ternopil	Lviv
18:00 EEST (UTC+03:00)	80'; 88'	Report	Riznyk 29', 44'	Stadium: Ukraina Stadium; Attendance: 0

22 January 2021 Friendly	FC Lviv (Ukraine)	5–1	(Ukraine) FC Ternovo	Mukachevo
EET (UTC+02:00)	Nych; China Remenyak	Report	Goal

28 January 2021 Friendly	FC Lviv (Ukraine)	3–0	(Montenegro) Rudar Pljevlja	Turkey
17:30 EET (UTC+02:00)	China; Brikner	Report

31 January 2021 Friendly	FC Lviv (Ukraine)	1–1	(North Macedonia) Shkupi	Turkey
16:30 EET (UTC+02:00)	Dovhyi	Report	Diack 10'

3 February 2021 Friendly	FC Lviv (Ukraine)	3–1	(Ukraine) Veres Rivne	Turkey
16:30 EET (UTC+02:00)	Romanchuk 43'; Alvaro 67'; Zakharkiv 72'	Report	Serhiychuk 8' (pen.)

5 February 2021 Friendly	FC Lviv (Ukraine)	1–1	(Latvia) Valmiera	Turkey
16:00 EET (UTC+02:00)	Zakharkiv 90+4'	Report	Sow 9'

6 February 2021 Friendly	FC Lviv (Ukraine)	1–1	(Georgia (country)) Dinamo Batumi	Turkey
17:00 EET (UTC+02:00)	Renan 30'	Report	Pantsulaia

28 March 2021 Friendly	FC Lviv (Ukraine)	4–0	(Ukraine) Feniks Pidmonastyr	Sukhovolya
15:00 EEST (UTC+03:00)	Remenyak 1'; Semeniv 7'; Romanchuk 75'; Antwi 86'	Report		Stadium: Sokil Stadium; Attendance: 0

== Competitions ==
=== Overall ===
Competition	First match	Last match	Starting round	Final position	Record							
Competition	First match	Last match	Starting round	Final position	Pld	W	D	L	GF	GA	GD	Win %
Premier League	22 August 2020	9 May 2021	Matchday 1	8th	26	8	5	13	25	51	−26	30.77
Cup	30 September 2020	30 September 2020	Round of 32 (1/16)	Round of 32 (1/16)	1	0	0	1	0	2	−2	0.00
Total					27	8	5	14	25	53	−28	29.63

Last updated: 9 May 2021
Source: Competitions

=== Premier League ===
==== League table ====
Pos	Team	Pld	W	D	L	GF	GA	GD	Pts
6	Desna Chernihiv	26	10	8	8	38	32	+6	38
7	SC Dnipro-1	26	8	6	12	36	38	−2	30
8	FC Lviv	26	8	5	13	25	51	−26	29 (Note: Head-to-head goal difference: Lviv +1, Oleksandriya -1)
9	FC Oleksandriya	26	8	5	13	33	37	−4	29
10	Rukh Lviv	26	6	10	10	27	39	−12	28

Source: Ukrainian Premier League
Rules for classification: 1) Points; 2) Head-to-head points; 3) Head-to-head goal difference; 4) Head-to-head higher number of goals scored; 5) Goal difference; 6) Higher number of goals scored; 7) Draw or "Golden match" if two teams tied for title (Article 22, paragraph 3).

==== Results summary ====
Overall								Home						Away					
Pld	W	D	L	GF	GA	GD	Pts	W	D	L	GF	GA	GD	W	D	L	GF	GA	GD
26	8	5	13	25	51	−26	29	5	3	5	15	23	−8	3	2	8	10	28	−18

Last updated: 9 May 2021.
Source: Competitive matches

==== Results by round ====
Round	1	2	3	4	5	6	7	8	9	10	11	12	13	14	15	16	17	18	19	20	21	22	23	24	25	26
Ground	H	A	A	H	A	A	H	H	A	A	H	H	A	A	H	H	A	H	H	A	A	H	H	A	A	H
Result	W	L	L	L	D	L	L	W	L	W	L	D	D	W	L	L	L	D	W	L	L	W	W	W	L	D
Position	8	14	14	14	14	14	14	13	14	13	13	13	13	10	12	14	14	14	12	12	13	12	9	9	9	8

Updated to match(es) played on 9 May 2021. Source: Competitive matches
A = Away; H = Home; W = Win; D = Draw; L = Loss

==== Matches ====
12 September 2020 2	Kolos Kovalivka	4–0	FC Lviv	Kovalivka
17:00 EEST (UTC+03:00)	Lysenko 28', 47'; Antyukh (yellow card) 33'; Havrysh 69'; Zadoya (yellow card) 79'; Novak (yellow card) 84'; Isayenko 90+4'	Report	Bohunov (yellow card) 32'; Mihoubi (yellow card) 58'; Hrysyo (yellow card) 87'	Stadium: Kolos Stadium; Attendance: 1,261; Referee: Yaroslav Kozyk

19 September 2020 3	Dynamo Kyiv	3–1	FC Lviv	Kyiv
19:30 EEST (UTC+03:00)	Tsyhankov 48' (pen.); Shaparenko (yellow card) 71', (goal) 87'; Supriaha (yellow card) 80', (goal) 90+5'	Report	Hrysyo (yellow card) 21'; Ainsalu (yellow card) 25'; Klymenchuk (yellow card) 47'; Kravchuk (yellow card) 59'; Čelić 62'; Mihoubi (yellow card) 73' (yellow-red card) 83'	Stadium: NSC Olimpiyskiy; Attendance: 0 Referee: Viktor Kopiyevskyi
Note: Match was played behind closed doors due to quarantine in Ukraine during COVID-19 pandemic.

27 September 2020 4	FC Lviv	0–5	Zorya Luhansk	Lviv
14:00 EEST (UTC+03:00)	Klymenchuk (yellow card) 33'; Hrysyo (yellow card) 64'	Report	Yurchenko 3'; Hromov 5', 28'; Hladkyy 33', 37'; Kabayev (yellow card) 33'; Favorov (yellow card) 55'; Cvek (yellow card) 82'; Vernydub (yellow card) 90'	Stadium: Ukraina Stadium; Attendance: 253; Referee: Oleksandr Omelchenko

3 October 2020 5	Rukh Lviv	0–0	FC Lviv	Lviv
17:00 EEST (UTC+03:00)	Mysyk (yellow card) 32'; Duts (yellow card) 50'; Paramonov (red card) 67'	Report	Hrysyo (yellow card) 7'	Stadium: Arena Lviv; Attendance: 3,941; Referee: Dmytro Kutakov

17 October 2020 6	Shakhtar Donetsk	5–1	FC Lviv	Kyiv
17:00 EEST (UTC+03:00)	Kovalenko 4', 18'; Marcos Antônio 9'; Dentinho 17'; Solomon 50'; Vakula (yellow card) 80'	Report	China (yellow card) 18', (goal) 25'; Koshman (yellow card) 46'; Kazlauskas (yellow card) 57'; Bohunov (yellow card) 62'; Borzenko (yellow card) 89'; Rafael Sabino (yellow card) 90'	Stadium: NSC Olimpiyskiy; Attendance: 0 Referee: Dmytro Bondarenko
Note: Match was played behind closed doors due to quarantine in Ukraine during COVID-19 pandemic.

24 October 2020 7	FC Lviv	1–3	SC Dnipro-1	Lviv
19:30 EEST (UTC+03:00)	Kravchuk 24'; Koshman (yellow card) 58'; Čirjak (yellow card) 84'	Report	Kohut 14', (yellow card) 64'; Dovbyk 25'; Nazarenko (yellow card) 55'; Lohinov (yellow card) 79'; Chychykov (yellow card) 83'	Stadium: Arena Lviv; Attendance: 0 Referee: Volodymyr Novokhatniy
Note: Match was played behind closed doors due to quarantine in Ukraine during COVID-19 pandemic.

1 November 2020 8	FC Lviv	1–0	Vorskla Poltava	Lviv
17:00 EEST (UTC+03:00)	Nych (yellow card) 6', (goal) 27'; Hrysyo (yellow card) 41'; Mahmutovic (yellow card) 59'; Rafael Sabino (yellow card) 89'; Mihoubi (yellow card) 90+6'	Report	Kulach (yellow card) 8'; Shcherbak (yellow card) 50'; Kane (yellow card) 90+3'	Stadium: Arena Lviv; Attendance: 0 Referee: Ihor Paskhal
Note: Match was played behind closed doors due to quarantine in Ukraine during COVID-19 pandemic.

7 November 2020 9	FC Oleksandriya	1–0	FC Lviv	Oleksandriya
17:00 EET (UTC+02:00)	Bezborodko (yellow card) 48'; Tretyakov 70' (pen.); Hrechyshkin (yellow card) 89'	Report	Kazlauskas (yellow card) 4'; Rafael Sabino (yellow card) 62'	Stadium: CSC Nika Stadium; Attendance: 0 Referee: Yuriy Ivanov
Note: Match was played behind closed doors due to quarantine in Ukraine during COVID-19 pandemic.

22 November 2020 10	Desna Chernihiv	0–1	FC Lviv	Chernihiv
17:00 EET (UTC+02:00)	Ohirya (yellow card) 31'	Report	Kazlauskas (yellow card) 19'; Hrysyo 21'; Zakharkiv (yellow card) 31'; Rafael Sabino (yellow card) 34'	Stadium: Chernihiv Stadium; Attendance: 0 Referee: Serhiy Boyko
Note: Match was played behind closed doors due to quarantine in Ukraine during COVID-19 pandemic.

27 November 2020 11	FC Lviv	1–3	FC Mariupol	Lviv
19:00 EET (UTC+02:00)	Romanchuk (yellow card) 29'; Mihoubi 73', (yellow card) 74'; Mahmutovic (yellow card) 76'; Pachtmann (yellow card) 89'	Report	Sikan 12'; Myshnyov 34'; Muravskyi (yellow card) 49'; Ocheretko 60'; Peterman (yellow card) 73'; Chekh (red card) 88'	Stadium: Arena Lviv; Attendance: 0 Referee: Yevhen Aranovskyi
Note: Match was played behind closed doors due to quarantine in Ukraine during COVID-19 pandemic.

5 December 2020 12	FC Lviv	1–1	Inhulets Petrove	Lviv
14:00 EEST (UTC+03:00)	Hrysyo (yellow card) 17' (yellow-red card) 79'; Mihoubi (yellow card) 22'; Kravchuk (yellow card) 41'; Rafael Sabino 45+2'; China (yellow card) 55' (yellow-red card) 87'; Yakimets (yellow card) 77'	Report	Sichinava (yellow card) 32'; Lupashko (yellow card) 39'; Bartulović 41' (pen.), (yellow card) 55'; Mkomola (yellow card) 45+1'; Balan (yellow card) 82'	Stadium: Arena Lviv; Attendance: 0 Referee: Yaroslav Kozyk
Note: Match was played behind closed doors due to quarantine in Ukraine during COVID-19 pandemic.

11 December 2020 13	Olimpik Donetsk	1–1	FC Lviv	Kyiv
19:00 EET (UTC+02:00)	Alvarenga (yellow card) 28'; Romanovskij 76'; Andriy Kravchuk (yellow card) 90+2'	Report	Rafael Sabino (yellow card) 35'; Yuriy Kravchuk 56'; Klymenchuk (yellow card) 79'	Stadium: Dynamo Stadium; Attendance: 0 Referee: Oleksiy Derevinskyi
Note: Match was played behind closed doors due to quarantine in Ukraine during COVID-19 pandemic.

13 February 2021 14	FC Mynai	1–2	FC Lviv	Uzhhorod
14:00 EET (UTC+02:00)	Petrusenko (yellow card) 17'; Shynder 47', (yellow card) 63'	Report	Alvaro 13', 45'; Rafael Sabino (yellow card) 72'	Stadium: Avanhard Stadium; Attendance: 0 Referee: Oleksandr Derdo
Note: Match was played behind closed doors due to quarantine in Ukraine during COVID-19 pandemic.

20 February 2021 15	FC Lviv	0–2	Kolos Kovalivka	Lviv
19:30 EET (UTC+02:00)	Alvaro (yellow card) 21'; Mahmutovic (yellow card) 64'; Nych (yellow card) 66'; Hrysyo (yellow card) 79'	Report	Orikhovskyi 33', 74' (pen.); Churko (yellow card) 45+5'; Ilyin (yellow card) 78'; Lysenko (yellow card) 88'	Stadium: Arena Lviv; Attendance: 573; Referee: Viktor Kopiyevskyi

28 February 2021 16	FC Lviv	1–4	Dynamo Kyiv	Lviv
19:30 EET (UTC+02:00)	Mahmutovic (yellow card) 33'; Brikner (yellow card) 36'; Nych 69'	Report	Besyedin 1'; Tsyhankov 36' (pen.); Kędziora 52'; Lyednyev 90'	Stadium: Arena Lviv; Attendance: 6,973; Referee: Dmytro Kryvushkin

7 March 2021 17	Zorya Luhansk	4–0	FC Lviv	Zaporizhia
17:00 EET (UTC+02:00)	Hladkyy 9', 16'; Sayyadmanesh 13', 39'; Vernydub (yellow card) 60'; Kocherhin (yellow card) 78'	Report	Mihoubi (yellow card) 35'; Romanchuk (yellow card) 90'	Stadium: Slavutych-Arena; Attendance: 836; Referee: Ihor Paskhal

21 March 2021 19	FC Lviv	3–2	Shakhtar Donetsk	Kharkiv
17:00 EET (UTC+02:00)	China (yellow card) 7', (goal) 73' (pen.); Brikner (yellow card) 16'; Alvaro 24'; Čirjak (yellow card) 33'; Nych 48'; Kostyk (yellow card) 90+4'	Report	Solomon 30', 56'; Moraes (yellow card) 32'; Alan Patrick (yellow card) 65'; Trubin (yellow card) 72'	Stadium: OSC Metalist; Attendance: 1,682; Referee: Mykola Balakin

2 April 2021 20	SC Dnipro-1	5–1	FC Lviv	Dnipro
19:00 EET (UTC+02:00)	Ćuže 19', 65'; Pikhalyonok (yellow card) 37'; Ihnatenko 59'; Kohut 63'; Di Franco (yellow card) 71'; Bill (yellow card) 79'; Adamyuk (yellow card) 82'; Dubinchak (yellow card) 85'; Gonçalves 90+3'	Report	Antwi (yellow card) 27' (yellow-red card) 44'; Čirjak (yellow card) 55'; Mahmutovic (yellow card) 67'; Alvaro 71' (pen.); Romanchuk (yellow card) 90+5'	Stadium: Dnipro-Arena; Attendance: 0 Referee: Maksym Kozyryatskyi
Note: Match was played behind closed doors due to quarantine in Ukraine during COVID-19 pandemic.

11 April 2021 21	Vorskla Poltava	2–1	FC Lviv	Poltava
14:00 EEST (UTC+03:00)	Yakubu (yellow card) 14'; Kane (yellow card) 32', (goal) 47'; Kulach 50'; Sklyar (yellow card) 90'	Report	Mahmutovic (yellow card) 8'; Čirjak (yellow card) 27'; Hrysyo (yellow card) 28'; Dovhyi 73'	Stadium: Vorskla Stadium; Attendance: 0 Referee: Mykola Balaknin
Note: Match was played behind closed doors due to quarantine in Ukraine during COVID-19 pandemic.

16 April 2021 22	FC Lviv	3–1	FC Oleksandriya	Lviv
17:00 EEST (UTC+03:00)	Antwi 39', (yellow card) 61'; Brikner 43'; Nych 56'; Rafael Sabino (yellow card) 89'	Report	Ustymenko 30'; Dubra (yellow card) 74'; Hrechyshkin (yellow card) 85'	Stadium: Arena Lviv; Attendance: 0 Referee: Oleksiy Derevinskyi
Note: Match was played behind closed doors due to quarantine in Ukraine during COVID-19 pandemic.

21 April 2021 1	FC Lviv	1–0	FC Mynai	Lutsk
14:00 EEST (UTC+03:00)	Dovhyi 39', (yellow card) 67'; Mahmutovic (yellow card) 69'; Busko (yellow card) 74'; Hrysyo (yellow card) 84'; Alvaro (yellow card) 85'; Romanchuk (yellow card) 90+4'	Report	Sakiv (yellow card) 74'	Stadium: Avanhard Stadium; Attendance: 408; Referee: Dmytro Bondarenko
Note: Match was scheduled to be played on 22 August 2020, but was postponed due COVID-19 outbreak in teams squads.

24 April 2021 23	FC Lviv	1–0	Desna Chernihiv	Lviv
19:30 EEST (UTC+03:00)	Renan 44'; Mahmutovic (yellow card) 56'; Dovhyi (yellow card) 68'; Čirjak (yellow card) 82'; Antwi (yellow card) 90+2'; Yakimets (red card) 90+3'	Report	Mostovyi (yellow card) 27'; Kalitvintsev (yellow card) 77'	Stadium: Arena Lviv; Attendance: 0 Referee: Yevhen Aranovskyi
Note: Match was played behind closed doors due to quarantine in Ukraine during COVID-19 pandemic.

28 April 2021 18	FC Lviv	1–1	Rukh Lviv	Lviv
19:00 EEST (UTC+03:00)	Mihoubi (yellow card) 10' (yellow-red card) 57'; Antwi (yellow card) 21', (goal) 33'; Alvaro (yellow card) 55'	Report	Kondrakov 54' (pen.), (yellow card) 90+3'	Stadium: Arena Lviv; Attendance: 2,572; Referee: Denys Shurman
Note: Match was scheduled to be played on 13 March 2021, but was postponed due COVID-19 outbreak in teams squads.

2 May 2021 24	FC Mariupol	1–2	FC Lviv	Mariupol
17:00 EEST (UTC+03:00)	Topalov 31'; Bykov (yellow card) 36'; Ocheretko (yellow card) 59'; Sahutkin (yellow card) 72'; Kulakov (yellow card) 90+3'	Report	Semeniv 33'; Mahmutovic (yellow card) 45', (goal) 89'; Romanchuk (yellow card) 72'	Stadium: Volodymyr Boiko Stadium; Attendance: 692; Referee: Yaroslav Kozyk

6 May 2021 25	Inhulets Petrove	1–0	FC Lviv	Kropyvnytskyi
19:00 EEST (UTC+03:00)	Bartulović 11'; Kozak (yellow card) 45+2'; Yanakov (yellow card) 87'; Vasin (yellow card) 88'	Report	Nych (yellow card) 17'; Busko (yellow card) 27'; Mihoubi (yellow card) 51'; Kazlauskas (yellow card) 60'; Čirjak (yellow card) 88'; Romanchuk (yellow card) 90+3'	Stadium: Zirka Stadium; Attendance: 365; Referee: Mykola Balakin

9 May 2021 26	FC Lviv	1–1	Olimpik Donetsk	Lviv
17:00 EEST (UTC+03:00)	Renan 28'; Antwi (yellow card) 79'; Dovhyi (yellow card) 89'	Report	Alvarenga (yellow card) 61'; Khamelyuk 86'	Stadium: Arena Lviv; Attendance: 1,150; Referee: Anastasiya Romanyuk

=== Ukrainian Cup ===
30 September 2020 Round of 32 (1/16)	Vorskla Poltava	2–0	FC Lviv	Poltava
17:00 EET (UTC+02:00)	Sklyar (yellow card) 77'; Kulach 78', 82'	Report		Stadium: Vorskla Stadium; Attendance: 546; Referee: Maksym Kozyryatskyi

== Statistics ==
=== Appearances and goals ===
No.	Pos	Nat	Player	Total		Premier League		Cup	
No.	Pos	Nat	Player	Apps	Goals	Apps	Goals	Apps	Goals
Goalkeepers
12	GK	(Ukraine) UKR	Orest Kostyk	17	0	16	0	1	0
31	GK	(Ukraine) UKR	Oleksandr Ilyuschenkov	7	0	7	0	0	0
Defenders
2	DF	(Ukraine) UKR	Ivan Lobay	5	0	1+4	0	0	0
4	DF	(Ukraine) UKR	Maksym Komarets	4	0	2+1	0	1	0
14	DF	(Ukraine) UKR	Maksym Brama	1	0	0	0	0+1	0
22	DF	(Luxembourg) LUX	Enes Mahmutovic	20	1	20	1	0	0
27	DF	(Ukraine) UKR	Andriy Busko	10	0	8+2	0	0	0
99	DF	(France) FRA	Maroine Mihoubi	17	1	16+1	1	0	0
	DF	(Ukraine) UKR	Oleh Alfyorov	1	0	0	0	0+1	0
	DF	(Ukraine) UKR	Yevhen Oberman	1	0	0	0	1	0
Midfielders
5	MF	(Ukraine) UKR	Oleksiy Dovhyi	12	2	8+4	2	0	0
7	MF	(Brazil) BRA	China	14	2	13+1	2	0	0
8	MF	(Ukraine) UKR	Ivan Brikner	11	1	9+2	1	0	0
9	MF	(Lithuania) LTU	Donatas Kazlauskas	13	0	9+4	0	0	0
11	MF	(Brazil) BRA	Welves	4	0	0+3	0	1	0
15	MF	(Ukraine) UKR	Borys Krushynskyi	3	0	0+3	0	0	0
16	MF	(Ukraine) UKR	Serhiy Topchiy	1	0	0+1	0	0	0
21	MF	(Ukraine) UKR	Oleksandr Romanchuk	20	0	11+8	0	1	0
24	MF	(Ukraine) UKR	Volodymyr Yakimets	16	0	15+1	0	0	0
47	MF	(Ukraine) UKR	Maksym Hrysyo	22	1	19+3	1	0	0
70	MF	(Ukraine) UKR	Ostap Malashevskyi	1	0	0	0	1	0
96	MF	(Brazil) BRA	Rafael Sabino	20	1	10+10	1	0	0
98	MF	(Ukraine) UKR	Dmytro Semeniv	14	1	3+11	1	0	0
	MF	(Ukraine) UKR	Ihor Bekerskyi	1	0	0	0	0+1	0
	MF	(Ukraine) UKR	Stanislav Demkiv	1	0	0	0	1	0
	MF	(Ukraine) UKR	Maksym Mudryi	1	0	0	0	0+1	0
Forwards
10	FW	(Brazil) BRA	Alvaro	13	4	13	4	0	0
13	FW	(Ukraine) UKR	Nazariy Nych	27	4	18+8	4	1	0
19	FW	(Brazil) BRA	Renan de Oliveira	9	2	6+3	2	0	0
25	FW	(Croatia) CRO	Frane Čirjak	20	0	12+8	0	0	0
29	FW	(Ukraine) UKR	Artur Remenyak	15	0	7+7	0	1	0
30	FW	(Ghana) GHA	Ernest Antwi	14	2	11+3	2	0	0
45	FW	(Ukraine) UKR	Yuriy Zakharkiv	8	0	3+5	0	0	0
	FW	(Ukraine) UKR	Artur-Bohdan Shuta	1	0	0	0	0+1	0
Players transferred out during the season
1	GK	(Ukraine) UKR	Serhiy Litovchenko	2	0	2	0	0	0
5	DF	(Ukraine) UKR	Yuriy Kravchuk	11	2	9+2	2	0	0
6	DF	(Croatia) CRO	Maks Čelić	4	1	4	1	0	0
8	MF	(Estonia) EST	Mihkel Ainsalu	11	0	10+1	0	0	0
9	MF	(Ukraine) UKR	Ihor Koshman	9	0	6+3	0	0	0
10	MF	(Ukraine) UKR	Yaroslav Bohunov	4	0	2+2	0	0	0
17	MF	(Ukraine) UKR	Andriy Vychizhanin	1	0	0	0	1	0
20	MF	(Ukraine) UKR	Yehor Klymenchuk	12	0	7+5	0	0	0
33	DF	(Ukraine) UKR	Serhiy Borzenko	4	0	4	0	0	0
35	DF	(Ukraine) UKR	Oleksandr Savoshko	1	0	0	0	1	0
77	FW	(Brazil) BRA	Filipe Pachtmann	7	0	4+3	0	0	0
94	GK	(Ukraine) UKR	Herman Penkov	1	0	1	0	0	0

Source: Competitions

Last updated: 9 May 2021

=== Goalscorers ===
Rank	No.	Pos	Nat	Name	Premier League	Cup	Total
1	10	FW	(Brazil)	Alvaro	4	0	4
1	13	FW	(Ukraine)	Nazariy Nych	4	0	4
3	5	DF	(Ukraine)	Yuriy Kravchuk	2	0	2
3	7	MF	(Brazil)	China	2	0	2
3	5	MF	(Ukraine)	Oleksiy Dovhyi	2	0	2
3	19	FW	(Brazil)	Renan de Oliveira	2	0	2
3	30	FW	(Ghana)	Ernest Antwi	2	0	2
8	6	DF	(Croatia)	Maks Čelić	1	0	1
8	8	MF	(Ukraine)	Ivan Brikner	1	0	1
8	22	DF	(Luxembourg)	Enes Mahmutovic	1	0	1
8	45	MF	(Ukraine)	Maksym Hrysyo	1	0	1
8	96	MF	(Brazil)	Rafael Sabino	1	0	1
8	98	MF	(Ukraine)	Dmytro Semeniv	1	0	1
8	99	DF	(France)	Maroine Mihoubi	1	0	1
				Total	25	0	25

Last updated: 9 May 2021

=== Clean sheets ===
Rank	No.	Pos	Nat	Name	Premier League	Cup	Total
1	12	GK	(Ukraine)	Orest Kostyk	2	0	2
1	31	GK	(Ukraine)	Oleksandr Ilyuschenkov	2	0	2
				Total	4	0	4

Last updated: 24 April 2021

=== Disciplinary record ===
No.	Pos	Nat	Player	Premier League			Cup			Total		
No.	Pos	Nat	Player	Booked	(yellow card) (yellow-red card)	Sent off (straight red)	Booked	(yellow card) (yellow-red card)	Sent off (straight red)	Booked	(yellow card) (yellow-red card)	Sent off (straight red)
5	MF	(Ukraine)	Oleksiy Dovhyi	3	0	0	0	0	0	3	0	0
5	DF	(Ukraine)	Yuriy Kravchuk	2	0	0	0	0	0	2	0	0
7	MF	(Brazil)	China	2	1	0	0	0	0	2	1	0
8	MF	(Estonia)	Mihkel Ainsalu	1	0	0	0	0	0	1	0	0
8	MF	(Ukraine)	Ivan Brikner	2	0	0	0	0	0	2	0	0
9	MF	(Lithuania)	Donatas Kazlauskas	4	0	0	0	0	0	4	0	0
9	MF	(Ukraine)	Ihor Koshman	2	0	0	0	0	0	2	0	0
10	FW	(Brazil)	Alvaro	3	0	0	0	0	0	3	0	0
10	MF	(Ukraine)	Yaroslav Bohunov	2	0	0	0	0	0	2	0	0
12	GK	(Ukraine)	Orest Kostyk	1	0	0	0	0	0	1	0	0
13	FW	(Ukraine)	Nazariy Nych	3	0	0	0	0	0	3	0	0
20	MF	(Ukraine)	Yehor Klymenchuk	3	0	0	0	0	0	3	0	0
21	MF	(Ukraine)	Oleksandr Romanchuk	6	0	0	0	0	0	6	0	0
22	DF	(Luxembourg)	Enes Mahmutovic	9	0	0	0	0	0	9	0	0
24	MF	(Ukraine)	Volodymyr Yakimets	1	0	1	0	0	0	1	0	1
25	FW	(Croatia)	Frane Čirjak	6	0	0	0	0	0	6	0	0
27	DF	(Ukraine)	Andriy Busko	2	0	0	0	0	0	2	0	0
30	FW	(Ghana)	Ernest Antwi	4	1	0	0	0	0	4	1	0
33	DF	(Ukraine)	Serhiy Borzenko	1	0	0	0	0	0	1	0	0
45	FW	(Ukraine)	Yuriy Zakharkiv	1	0	0	0	0	0	1	0	0
47	MF	(Ukraine)	Maksym Hrysyo	8	1	0	0	0	0	8	1	0
77	FW	(Brazil)	Filipe Pachtmann	1	0	0	0	0	0	1	0	0
96	MF	(Brazil)	Rafael Sabino	7	0	0	0	0	0	7	0	0
99	DF	(France)	Maroine Mihoubi	6	2	0	0	0	0	6	2	0
			Total	80	5	1	0	0	0	80	5	1

Last updated: 9 May 2021

=== Attendances ===
	Matches	Attendances	Average	High	Low
Premier League	13	13,611	1,047	6,973	0
Cup	0	0	0	0	0
Total	13	13,611	1,047	6,973	0

Last updated: 9 May 2021
