= List of Ukrainian football transfers summer 2020 =

This is a list of Ukrainian football transfers summer 2020. Only clubs in 2020–21 Ukrainian Premier League are included.

== Ukrainian Premier League ==
=== Desna Chernihiv ===
In:

No.	Pos.	Nation	Player
—	DF	UKR	Pavlo Polehenko (from FC Mariupol)
—	MF	GRE	Georgios Ermidis (from (Greece) Panionios U-19)
—	MF	UKR	Mykhailo Mudryk (on loan from Shakhtar Donetsk)
—	MF	UKR	Oleksandr Volkov (loan return from Kolos Kovalivka)
—	FW	UKR	Maksym Dehtyarov (from Olimpik Donetsk)

Out:

No.	Pos.	Nation	Player
—	GK	UKR	Maksym Tatarenko (to Kudrivka)
—	DF	UKR	Denys Favorov (to Zorya Luhansk)
—	MF	UKR	Orest Kuzyk (loan return to (Greece) PAS Giannina)
—	FW	UKR	Oleksandr Filippov (to (Belgium) Sint-Truiden)

=== Dnipro-1 ===
In:

No.	Pos.	Nation	Player
—	GK	UKR	Bohdan Sarnavskyi (from FC Lviv)
—	DF	BRA	Douglas (free agent)
—	DF	UKR	Vladyslav Dubinchak (on loan from Dynamo Kyiv)
—	DF	UKR	Oleksandr Safronov (loan return from (Estonia) Levadia Tallinn)
—	MF	UKR	Oleksandr Byelyayev (loan return from (Georgia (country)) Saburtalo Tbilisi)
—	MF	UKR	Danylo Ihnatenko (on loan from Shakhtar Donetsk)
—	MF	UKR	Oleksandr Pikhalyonok (on loan from Shakhtar Donetsk)
—	FW	UKR	Artem Dovbyk (from (Denmark) FC Midtjylland)
—	FW	UKR	Oleh Kozhushko (loan return from Kolos Kovalivka)

Out:

No.	Pos.	Nation	Player
—	GK	UKR	Viktor Babichyn (to Rukh Lviv)
—	GK	UKR	Andriy Klishchuk
—	DF	SEN	Papa Gueye (to Metal Kharkiv)
—	DF	UKR	Maksym Lopyryonok (on loan to FC Mynai)
—	DF	UKR	Volodymyr Polyovyi (to Metalurh Zaporizhya)
—	DF	UKR	Bohdan Zhinchyn (on loan to VPK-Ahro Shevchenkivka)
—	MF	UKR	Ivan Lytvynenko (to Rukh Lviv)
—	MF	SUI	Griffin Sabatini (on loan to (Scotland) Airdrieonians)
—	MF	UKR	Vladyslav Shapoval (to Volyn Lutsk)
—	MF	UKR	Oleksandr Snizhko (to FC Mynai)
—	FW	UKR	Oleh Kozhushko (to Chornomorets Odesa)
—	FW	UKR	Vladyslav Supriaha (loan return to Dynamo Kyiv)

=== Dynamo Kyiv ===
In:

No.	Pos.	Nation	Player
—	DF	UKR	Akhmed Alibekov (loan return from (Czech Republic) Slovan Liberec)
—	DF	UKR	Alan Aussi (loan return from (Czech Republic) Slovan Liberec)
—	DF	UKR	Volodymyr Kostevych (from (Poland) Lech Poznań)
—	DF	UKR	Oleksandr Osman (loan return from Metalist 1925 Kharkiv)
—	DF	UKR	Oleksandr Tymchyk (loan return from Zorya Luhansk)
—	MF	ROU	Tudor Băluță (on loan from (England) Brighton)
—	MF	UKR	Denys Harmash (loan return from (Turkey) Rizespor)
—	MF	BLR	Nikita Korzun (loan return from (Portugal) Vilafranquense)
—	MF	UKR	Mykyta Kravchenko (loan return from Olimpik Donetsk)
—	MF	UKR	Bohdan Lyednyev (loan return from Zorya Luhansk)
—	MF	UKR	Yuriy Shpyrka (loan return from Prykarpattia Ivano-Frankivsk)
—	MF	UKR	Yuriy Tlumak (from Karpaty Lviv)
—	MF	UKR	Denys Yanakov (loan return from Chornomorets Odesa)
—	FW	BRA	Clayton (from (Brazil) Atlético Mineiro)
—	FW	LUX	Gerson Rodrigues (loan return from (Turkey) Ankaragücü)
—	FW	UKR	Artem Kravets (from (Turkey) Kayserispor)
—	FW	UKR	Vladyslav Supriaha (loan return from SC Dnipro-1)

Out:

No.	Pos.	Nation	Player
—	GK	UKR	Vladyslav Kucheruk (on loan to Kolos Kovalivka)
—	GK	UKR	Artem Malysh (to Inhulets Petrove)
—	DF	UKR	Akhmed Alibekov (on loan to (Russia) FC Ufa)
—	DF	UKR	Alan Aussi (on loan to (Belarus) Torpedo-BelAZ Zhodino)
—	DF	UKR	Vladyslav Dubinchak (on loan to SC Dnipro-1)
—	DF	UKR	Mykyta Kravchenko (on loan to Kolos Kovalivka)
—	DF	UKR	Oleksandr Osman (to Obolon Kyiv)
—	DF	CRO	Josip Pivarić (to (Croatia) Lokomotiva)
—	DF	UKR	Oleksandr Romanchuk (to FC Lviv)
—	DF	UKR	Mykola Yarosh (on loan to Metal Kharkiv)
—	MF	NGR	Benito (on loan to Olimpik Donetsk)
—	MF	GHA	Mohammed Kadiri (on loan to (Russia) Arsenal Tula)
—	MF	BLR	Nikita Korzun (to (Belarus) Shakhtyor Soligorsk)
—	MF	UKR	Yuriy Shpyrka (to Prykarpattia Ivano-Frankivsk)
—	MF	UKR	Denys Yanakov (to Zorya Luhansk)
—	FW	UKR	Yevhen Isayenko (on loan to Kolos Kovalivka)
—	FW	BEL	Ibrahim Kargbo Jr. (on loan to Olimpik Donetsk)
—	FW	UKR	Artem Kravets (to (Turkey) Konyaspor)
—	FW	UKR	Yevhen Ryazantsev (to Metal Kharkiv)
—	FW	ESP	Fran Sol (on loan to (Spain) Tenerife)

=== Inhulets Petrove ===
In:

No.	Pos.	Nation	Player
—	GK	UKR	Volodymyr Krynskyi (from Olimpik Donetsk)
—	GK	UKR	Artem Malysh (from Dynamo Kyiv)
—	DF	UKR	Ihor Kotsyumaka (loan return from Hirnyk Kryvyi Rih)
—	MF	UKR	Volodymyr Bilotserkovets (on loan from Zorya Luhansk)
—	MF	TAN	Yohana Mkomola (on loan from Vorskla Poltava)
—	MF	UKR	Bohdan Lytvyak (from Kremin Kremenchuk)
—	MF	UKR	Suleyman Seytkhalilov (from Zirka Kropyvnytskyi)
—	MF	UKR	Mykhaylo Shyshka (from (Georgia (country)) Samtredia)
—	MF	UKR	Denys Yanakov (on loan from Zorya Luhansk)
—	FW	GHA	Rudolf Blagogee (from (Portugal) Sporting U-19)

Out:

No.	Pos.	Nation	Player
—	GK	UKR	Roman Lyopka (to Kryvbas Kryvyi Rih (2020))
—	DF	UKR	Volodymyr Senytsya (to Epitsentr Dunaivtsi)
—	MF	UKR	Ihor Zahalskyi (to Obolon Kyiv)
—	FW	UKR	Volodymyr Korobka (to Metalist 1925 Kharkiv)
—	FW	UKR	Oleksandr Mishurenko (to Kryvbas Kryvyi Rih (2020))

=== Kolos Kovalivka ===
In:

No.	Pos.	Nation	Player
—	GK	UKR	Vladyslav Kucheruk (on loan from Dynamo Kyiv)
—	DF	UKR	Yevhen Novak (from (North Macedonia) Vardar)
—	MF	UKR	Arsentiy Doroshenko (loan return from Podillya Khmelnytskyi)
—	MF	UKR	Mykyta Kravchenko (on loan from Dynamo Kyiv)
—	MF	UKR	Oleksiy Lobov (from Avanhard Kramatorsk)
—	FW	UKR	Yevhen Isayenko (on loan from Dynamo Kyiv)
—	FW	UKR	Yevhen Seleznyov (from (Turkey) Bursaspor)

Out:

No.	Pos.	Nation	Player
—	GK	UKR	Anton Kotovyi (to FC Cherkashchyna)
—	GK	UKR	Anton Yashkov (on loan to Polissya Zhytomyr)
—	DF	UKR	Vadym Paramonov (to Rukh Lviv)
—	DF	UKR	Yevhen Yefremov (to (Lithuania) Sūduva Marijampolė)
—	MF	UKR	Arsentiy Doroshenko (to Avanhard Kramatorsk)
—	MF	UKR	Oleksiy Lobov (on loan to Avanhard Kramatorsk)
—	MF	LAT	Vladislavs Soloveičiks (to (Latvia) Jelgava)
—	MF	UKR	Stanislav Sorokin (on loan to Kremin Kremenchuk)
—	MF	UKR	Oleksandr Volkov (loan return to Desna Chernihiv)
—	MF	UKR	Oleksandr Bondarenko (on loan to Volyn Lutsk)
—	FW	UKR	Oleh Kozhushko (loan return to SC Dnipro-1)
—	FW	ISL	Árni Vilhjálmsson

=== Lviv ===
In:

No.	Pos.	Nation	Player
—	GK	UKR	Serhiy Litovchenko (from Volyn Lutsk)
—	DF	CRO	Maks Čelić (from (Croatia) Gorica)
—	DF	LUX	Enes Mahmutovic (from (England) Middlesbrough)
—	DF	FRA	Maroine Mihoubi (from (France) Aubagne)
—	DF	UKR	Oleksandr Romanchuk (from Dynamo Kyiv)
—	MF	EST	Mihkel Ainsalu (from (Estonia) Flora Tallinn)
—	MF	CRO	Frane Čirjak (from (Bosnia and Herzegovina) Zrinjski Mostar)
—	MF	UKR	Maksym Hrysyo (from FC Cherkashchyna)
—	MF	LTU	Donatas Kazlauskas (from (Lithuania) Riteriai)
—	MF	UKR	Ihor Koshman (from (Georgia (country)) Shevardeni-1906 Tbilisi)
—	MF	UKR	Volodymyr Yakimets (from Karpaty Lviv)
—	FW	GHA	Ernest Antwi (from Rukh Lviv)
—	FW	UKR	Yuriy Zakharkiv (from (Latvia) Jelgava)

Out:

No.	Pos.	Nation	Player
—	GK	UKR	Serhiy Litovchenko
—	GK	UKR	Bohdan Sarnavskyi (to SC Dnipro-1)
—	DF	FRA	Joël Bopesu (to (France) Canet Roussillon)
—	DF	UKR	Serhiy Borzenko
—	DF	UKR	Anton Bratkov (to Metalist 1925 Kharkiv)
—	DF	BRA	Cleber (to (Brazil) Macaé)
—	DF	UKR	Ihor Honchar (to (Armenia) Alashkert)
—	DF	UKR	Serhiy Lyulka (to Metal Kharkiv)
—	DF	UKR	Vladyslav Pryimak (to Volyn Lutsk)
—	MF	BRA	Alvaro (on loan to (Azerbaijan) Keşla)
—	MF	BRA	Araujo
—	MF	BRA	Jonatan Lima (to Kremin Kremenchuk)
—	MF	UKR	Mykyta Khodakovskyi
—	MF	UKR	Artem Nedolya
—	MF	UKR	Mykyta Tatarkov (to Vorskla Poltava)
—	FW	UKR	Yaroslav Bohunov (disqualified)
—	FW	BRA	Matheus Iacovelli (to (Brazil) Betim)
—	FW	BRA	Renan de Oliveira (on loan to (Portugal) Gil Vicente)

=== Mariupol ===
In:

No.	Pos.	Nation	Player
—	GK	UKR	Oleh Kudryk (on loan from Shakhtar Donetsk)
—	GK	UKR	Oleh Kudryk (from Shakhtar Donetsk)
—	DF	UKR	Petro Stasyuk (from FC Mynai)
—	DF	UKR	Vyacheslav Velyev (from Chornomorets Odesa)
—	MF	UKR	Artem Bondarenko (on loan from Shakhtar Donetsk)
—	MF	UKR	Oleh Ocheretko (on loan from Shakhtar Donetsk)
—	MF	UKR	Ivan Mochevynskyi (loan return from Polissya Zhytomyr)
—	FW	UKR	Vladyslav Buhay (loan return from MFC Mykolaiv)
—	FW	UKR	Danylo Sikan (on loan from Shakhtar Donetsk)

Out:

No.	Pos.	Nation	Player
—	GK	UKR	Oleh Kudryk (loan return to Shakhtar Donetsk)
—	DF	CMR	Joyskim Dawa (to (Latvia) Valmiera)
—	DF	UKR	Viktor Korniyenko (loan return to Shakhtar Donetsk)
—	DF	UKR	Serhiy Yavorskyi (to Vorskla Poltava)
—	DF	UKR	Pavlo Polehenko (to Desna Chernihiv)
—	MF	UKR	Vladyslav Bondar (to Avanhard Kramatorsk)
—	MF	UKR	Valeriy Fedorchuk (to Rukh Lviv)
—	MF	UKR	Danylo Ihnatenko (loan return to Shakhtar Donetsk)
—	MF	UKR	Illya Putrya (to Chornomorets Odesa)
—	FW	UKR	Artem Dudik (loan return to Shakhtar Donetsk)
—	FW	UKR	Vladyslav Buhay (to Chornomorets Odesa)
—	FW	UKR	Ruslan Fomin (to Metal Kharkiv)

=== Mynai ===
In:

No.	Pos.	Nation	Player
—	GK	UKR	Anton Kanibolotskiy (from Karpaty Lviv)
—	DF	UKR	Maksym Lopyryonok (on loan from SC Dnipro-1)
—	DF	CRO	Mislav Matić (from (Croatia) Lokomotiva)
—	DF	ZAM	Shemmy Mayembe (from (Zambia) ZESCO United)
—	DF	UKR	Kyrylo Melichenko (on loan from Shakhtar Donetsk)
—	DF	UKR	Dmytro Pavlish (on loan from Shakhtar Donetsk)
—	DF	UKR	Taras Sakiv (from Rukh Lviv)
—	MF	ESP	Edgar Caparrós (from (Spain) Torrijos)
—	MF	UKR	Oleksiy Khakhlyov (from Karpaty Lviv)
—	MF	UKR	Denys Kozhanov (from Volyn Lutsk)
—	MF	RSA	Tercious Malepe (from (South Africa) Orlando Pirates)
—	MF	UKR	Oleksiy Shpak (loan return from Podillya Khmelnytskyi)
—	MF	UKR	Oleksandr Snizhko (from SC Dnipro-1)
—	FW	UKR	Anton Shynder (from (Germany) SC 04 Schwabach)

Out:

No.	Pos.	Nation	Player
—	DF	UKR	Orkhan Ibadov
—	DF	UKR	Roman Nykytyuk (to Volyn Lutsk)
—	DF	UKR	Petro Stasyuk (to FC Mariupol)
—	DF	UKR	Maksym Zhychykov (to Metalist 1925 Kharkiv)
—	MF	UKR	Mykhaylo Kopolovets (retired)
—	MF	UKR	Serhiy Mashtalir (to FC Uzhhorod)
—	MF	UKR	Vladyslav Mykulyak (retired)
—	MF	UKR	Bohdan Orynchak (loan return to Rukh Lviv)
—	MF	UKR	Ihor Vahin (to FC Uzhhorod)

=== Oleksandriya ===
In:

No.	Pos.	Nation	Player
—	DF	UKR	Valeriy Bondarenko (on loan from Shakhtar Donetsk)
—	MF	UKR	Maksym Tretyakov (from (Slovakia) Dunajská Streda)
—	MF	UKR	Vadym Yanchak (from (Slovakia) Lokomotíva Košice)

Out:

No.	Pos.	Nation	Player
—	DF	UKR	Anton Shendrik (to (Autonomous Republic of Crimea) Krymteplytsia Molodizhne)
—	DF	UKR	Kyrylo Prokopchuk (to Polissya Zhytomyr)
—	MF	UKR	Bohdan Lytvyak (to Kremin Kremenchuk)
—	MF	UKR	Yevhen Protasov (to Volyn Lutsk)
—	MF	POR	João Teixeira
—	MF	UKR	Maksym Tretyakov (loan return to (Slovakia) Dunajská Streda)

=== Olimpik Donetsk ===
In:

No.	Pos.	Nation	Player
—	GK	UKR	Anton Kotovyi (from FC Cherkashchyna)
—	DF	UKR	Rizvan Ablitarov (from (Kazakhstan) Kaisar Kyzylorda)
—	DF	FRA	Issiar Dramé (from (France) Lyon B)
—	DF	UKR	Yevhen Neplyakh (free agent)
—	MF	ARG	Fabricio Alvarenga (from (Argentina) Vélez Sarsfield)
—	MF	UKR	Ruslan Babenko (from (Poland) Raków Częstochowa)
—	MF	NGR	Benito (on loan from Dynamo Kyiv)
—	MF	BLR	Kirill Kirilenko (from Karpaty Lviv)
—	MF	AZE	Arziman Rizvanov (loan return from Avanhard Kramatorsk)
—	FW	BEL	Ibrahim Kargbo Jr. (on loan from Dynamo Kyiv)

Out:

No.	Pos.	Nation	Player
—	GK	UKR	Volodymyr Krynskyi (to Inhulets Petrove)
—	DF	UKR	Pavlo Lukyanchuk (to Obolon Kyiv)
—	DF	UKR	Dmytro Lytvyn
—	DF	UKR	Yevhen Neplyakh (to Alians Lypova Dolyna)
—	MF	UKR	Vitaliy Balashov (to (Russia) FC Tambov)
—	MF	UKR	Vitaliy Hoshkoderya (to Metalist 1925 Kharkiv)
—	MF	MKD	Demir Imeri (to (Albania) Vllaznia Shkodër)
—	MF	UKR	Mykyta Kravchenko (loan return to Dynamo Kyiv)
—	MF	UKR	Nazar Verbnyi (to Karpaty Halych)
—	FW	UKR	Denys Balanyuk (to (Russia) Torpedo Moscow)
—	FW	UKR	Maksym Dehtyarov (to Desna Chernihiv)
—	FW	SEN	Matar Dieye (to (Croatia) Gorica)

=== Rukh Lviv ===
In:

No.	Pos.	Nation	Player
—	GK	UKR	Viktor Babichyn (from SC Dnipro-1)
—	GK	UKR	Yuriy-Volodymyr Hereta (from Karpaty Lviv)
—	DF	UKR	Maksym Bilyi (from Zorya Luhansk)
—	DF	SLO	Erik Gliha (from (Slovenia) Triglav Kranj)
—	DF	UKR	Roman Hahun (from Ahrobiznes Volochysk)
—	DF	UKR	Vadym Paramonov (from Kolos Kovalivka)
—	DF	UKR	Vitaliy Roman (from Karpaty Lviv)
—	DF	BRA	Sidney (loan return from (Armenia) Ararat Yerevan)
—	DF	SRB	Miloš Stamenković (from (Kazakhstan) Irtysh Pavlodar)
—	DF	UKR	Oleh Veremiyenko (from Karpaty Lviv)
—	DF	SLO	David Zec (on loan from (Portugal) Benfica B)
—	MF	UKR	Ihor Boychuk (from Ahrobiznes Volochysk)
—	MF	UKR	Oleksandr Chepelyuk (loan return from Hirnyk-Sport Horishni Plavni)
—	MF	UKR	Valeriy Fedorchuk (from FC Mariupol)
—	MF	UKR	Andriy Kukharuk (from Ahrobiznes Volochysk)
—	MF	UKR	Ivan Lytvynenko (from SC Dnipro-1)
—	MF	UKR	Bohdan Orynchak (loan return from FC Mynai)
—	MF	UKR	Ostap Prytula (from Karpaty Lviv)
—	MF	UKR	Vasyl Runich (from Karpaty Lviv)
—	MF	UKR	Nazar Rusyak (from Karpaty Lviv)
—	MF	UKR	Bohdan Slyubyk (from Karpaty Lviv)
—	FW	UKR	Yaroslav Karabin (from Karpaty Lviv)
—	FW	ISR	Hisham Layous (from Karpaty Lviv)

Out:

No.	Pos.	Nation	Player
—	GK	UKR	Oleksandr Ilyuschenkov
—	DF	UKR	Maksym Bilyi (loan return to Zorya Luhansk)
—	DF	UKR	Ruslan Marushka (to Karpaty Halych)
—	DF	UKR	Taras Sakiv (to FC Mynai)
—	DF	BRA	Sidney
—	MF	GEO	Rati Ardazishvili
—	MF	UKR	Oleksandr Chepelyuk (to Hirnyk-Sport Horishni Plavni)
—	MF	BRA	Gabriel
—	MF	UKR	Mykhaylo Kaluhin (to Hirnyk-Sport Horishni Plavni)
—	MF	UKR	Andriy Korobenko
—	MF	UKR	Bohdan Orynchak (to Volyn Lutsk)
—	MF	UKR	Yuriy Romanyuk (to Ahrobiznes Volochysk)
—	MF	UKR	Oleh Synytsya
—	FW	GHA	Ernest Antwi (to FC Lviv)
—	FW	UKR	Stanislav Bilenkyi (loan return to (Slovakia) DAC Dunajská Streda)

=== Shakhtar Donetsk ===
In:

No.	Pos.	Nation	Player
—	GK	UKR	Oleh Kudryk (loan return from Karpaty Lviv)
—	GK	UKR	Oleh Kudryk (loan return from FC Mariupol)
—	DF	UKR	Valeriy Bondarenko (loan return from (Portugal) Vitória Guimarães)
—	DF	UKR	Viktor Korniyenko (loan return from FC Mariupol)
—	MF	UKR	Danylo Ihnatenko (loan return from FC Mariupol)
—	MF	UKR	Klim Prykhodko (loan return from Vorskla Poltava)
—	MF	UKR	Oleksandr Zubkov (loan return from (Hungary) Ferencváros)
—	FW	UKR	Andriy Boryachuk (loan return from (Turkey) Çaykur Rizespor)
—	FW	UKR	Artem Dudik (loan return from FC Mariupol)
—	FW	NGR	Olarenwaju Kayode (loan return from (Turkey) Gazişehir Gaziantep)

Out:

No.	Pos.	Nation	Player
—	GK	UKR	Oleh Kudryk (on loan to FC Mariupol)
—	GK	UKR	Oleh Kudryk (to FC Mariupol)
—	DF	UKR	Valeriy Bondarenko (on loan to FC Oleksandriya)
—	DF	UKR	Kyrylo Melichenko (on loan to FC Mynai)
—	DF	UKR	Dmytro Pavlish (on loan to FC Mynai)
—	MF	UKR	Artem Bondarenko (on loan to FC Mariupol)
—	MF	UKR	Danylo Ihnatenko (on loan to SC Dnipro-1)
—	MF	UKR	Dmytro Kryskiv (on loan to Metalist 1925 Kharkiv)
—	MF	UKR	Mykhailo Mudryk (on loan to Desna Chernihiv)
—	MF	UKR	Oleh Ocheretko (on loan to FC Mariupol)
—	MF	UKR	Oleksandr Pikhalyonok (on loan to SC Dnipro-1)
—	MF	UKR	Maksym Voytikhovskyi (to Volyn Lutsk)
—	MF	UKR	Oleksandr Zubkov (to (Hungary) Ferencváros)
—	FW	UKR	Andriy Boryachuk (on loan to (Hungary) Mezőkövesd)
—	FW	UKR	Artem Dudik (to (Poland) Sandecja Nowy Sącz)
—	FW	NGR	Olarenwaju Kayode (on loan to (Turkey) Sivasspor)
—	FW	BRA	Wellington Nem
—	FW	UKR	Danylo Sikan (on loan to FC Mariupol)

=== Vorskla Poltava ===
In:

No.	Pos.	Nation	Player
—	DF	UKR	Serhiy Yavorskyi (from FC Mariupol)
—	MF	CRO	Ivan Pešić (from (Kazakhstan) Kaisar Kyzylorda)
—	MF	UKR	Mykyta Tatarkov (from FC Lviv)

Out:

No.	Pos.	Nation	Player
—	GK	UKR	Danylo Kanevtsev (to Metal Kharkiv)
—	DF	BRA	Artur (to (Azerbaijan) Keşla)
—	DF	ESP	Juanma García
—	DF	UKR	Yevhen Martynenko (on loan to Chornomorets Odesa)
—	DF	UKR	Maksym Melnychuk (to Chornomorets Odesa)
—	DF	UKR	Denys Taraduda
—	MF	UKR	Artem Habelok (to (Armenia) Pyunik Yerevan)
—	MF	UKR	Artem Bilyi
—	MF	BRA	Luizão (loan return to (Portugal) Porto)
—	MF	TAN	Yohana Mkomola (on loan to Inhulets Petrove)
—	MF	UKR	Klim Prykhodko (loan return to Shakhtar Donetsk)
—	MF	BIH	Edin Šehić (to (Croatia) Rudeš)
—	FW	UKR	Denys Halata (on loan to Kremin Kremenchuk)
—	FW	UKR	Yuriy Kozyrenko (on loan to Hirnyk-Sport Horishni Plavni)
—	FW	UKR	Volodymyr Odaryuk (to MFC Mykolaiv)

=== Zorya Luhansk ===
In:

No.	Pos.	Nation	Player
—	DF	UKR	Maksym Bilyi (loan return from Rukh Lviv)
—	DF	UKR	Denys Favorov (from Desna Chernihiv)
—	DF	ISR	Maksim Grechkin (on loan from (Israel) Beitar Jerusalem)
—	DF	BRA	Leovigildo (from (North Macedonia) Vardar)
—	DF	MKD	Agron Rufati (from (Croatia) Istra 1961)
—	DF	UKR	Tymofiy Sukhar (loan return from Metalurh Zaporizhya)
—	MF	UKR	Serhiy Hryn (from (Denmark) Vejle)
—	MF	UKR	Yehor Nazaryna (from (Belgium) Royal Antwerp)
—	MF	UKR	Denys Yanakov (from Dynamo Kyiv)
—	FW	UKR	Oleksandr Hladkyy (from (Turkey) Adana Demirspor)
—	FW	IRI	Allahyar Sayyadmanesh (on loan from (Turkey) Fenerbahçe)

Out:

No.	Pos.	Nation	Player
—	GK	UKR	Danylo Khmelovskyi (on loan to Metalurh Zaporizhya)
—	DF	UKR	Maksym Bilyi (to Rukh Lviv)
—	DF	UKR	Yevhen Cheberko (to (Austria) LASK)
—	DF	UKR	Mykyta Kamenyuka (retired)
—	DF	UKR	Bohdan Mykhaylichenko (to (Belgium) Anderlecht)
—	DF	UKR	Oleksandr Tymchyk (loan return to Dynamo Kyiv)
—	MF	UKR	Volodymyr Bilotserkovets (on loan to Inhulets Petrove)
—	MF	UKR	Maksym Kazakov
—	MF	UKR	Bohdan Lyednyev (loan return to Dynamo Kyiv)
—	MF	UKR	Denys Yanakov (on loan to Inhulets Petrove)
—	FW	SRB	Nemanja Ivanović (to (Serbia) Zlatibor Čajetina)
—	FW	UKR	Serhiy Mayboroda (to Avanhard Kramatorsk)

== Ukrainian Second League ==
=== Cherkashchyna ===
In:

No.	Pos.	Nation	Player

Out: Note: Flags indicate national team as defined under FIFA eligibility rules; some limited exceptions apply. Players may hold more than one non-FIFA nationality.

No.	Pos.	Nation	Player
-	GK	UKR	Anatoliy Tymofeyev (to FC Chernihiv)

=== FC Chernihiv ===
In:

No.	Pos.	Nation	Player
—	GK	UKR	Oleksandr Shyray (from Avanhard Koryukivka)
—	GK	UKR	Oleksandr Roshchynskyi (from Avanhard Koryukivka)
—	GK	UKR	Anatoliy Tymofeyev (from Cherkashchyna)
—	DF	UKR	Ruslan Dedukh (from Nyva Ternopil)
—	DF	UKR	Andriy Veresotskyi (from Avanhard Koryukivka)
—	FW	UKR	Maksym Chaus (from Krystal Kherson)

Out: Note: Flags indicate national team as defined under FIFA eligibility rules; some limited exceptions apply. Players may hold more than one non-FIFA nationality.

No.	Pos.	Nation	Player
—	DF	UKR	Eduard Halstyan (to Desna-2 Chernihiv)
—	DF	UKR	Oleksandr Rudenko (to Kudrivka)
—	DF	UKR	Volodymyr Holovan (to Kudrivka)

=== Nyva Ternopil ===
In:

No.	Pos.	Nation	Player

Out: Note: Flags indicate national team as defined under FIFA eligibility rules; some limited exceptions apply. Players may hold more than one non-FIFA nationality.

No.	Pos.	Nation	Player
-	DF	UKR	Ruslan Dedukh (to FC Chernihiv)

FC Nyva Ternopil
