= Topchiy =

Topchiy is a surname. Notable people with the surname include:

- Leonid Topchiy (1913–1974), Soviet writer
- Serhiy Topchiy (born 2001), Ukrainian footballer
