= Danylo Beskorovaynyi =

Ukrainian footballer

Personal information
- Full name: Danylo Leonidovych Beskorovaynyi
- Date of birth: 7 February 1999 (age 27)
- Place of birth: Kryvyi Rih, Ukraine
- Height: 1.94 m (6 ft 4 in)
- Position: Centre-back

Team information
- Current team: Lechia Gdańsk
- Number: 21

Youth career
- 2008–2013: Kryvbas Kryvyi Rih
- 2013–2015: Youth Sportive School Kharkiv
- 2015–2017: Volyn Lutsk

Senior career*
| Years | Team | Apps | (Gls) |
| 2017 | Volyn Lutsk | 12 | (0) |
| 2018 | Atlantas | 5 | (0) |
| 2018–2023 | DAC Dunajská Streda | 48 | (2) |
| 2018 | → Slavoj Trebišov (loan) | 1 | (0) |
| 2018–2019 | → Zemplín Michalovce (loan) | 22 | (0) |
| 2020 | → Šamorín (loan) | 1 | (0) |
| 2022 | → Astana (loan) | 20 | (0) |
| 2023–2024 | Kryvbas Kryvyi Rih | 37 | (3) |
| 2024–2026 | Polissya Zhytomyr | 5 | (0) |
| 2026 | → Sumgayit (loan) | 14 | (0) |
| 2026– | Lechia Gdańsk | 0 | (0) |

International career
| 2019 | Ukraine U20 | 9 | (0) |
Medal record
Men's football
Representing Ukraine
FIFA U-20 World Cup
| Winner | 2019 Poland |
- * Club domestic league appearances and goals as of 22 June 2026

Danylo Leonidovych Beskorovaynyi (Ukrainian: Данило Леонідович Бескоровайний; born 7 February 1999) is a Ukrainian professional footballer who plays as a centre-back for I liga club Lechia Gdańsk.

== Club career ==
Beskorovaynyi is a product of Kryvbas Kryvyi Rih (his first coach was Vitaliy Bondaryev) and Youth Sportive School Kharkiv (KhOVUFKS).

=== Zemplín Michalovce ===
Beskorovaynyi made his Fortuna Liga debut for Zemplín Michalovce against Senica on 18 August 2018.

==== Loan to Astana ====
On 27 January 2022, Beskorovainyi joined Astana on loan from DAC 1904 for the 2022 season, with the option to make the move permanent. On 11 December 2022, Astana announced that they had not taken up the offer to make Beskorovainyi's transfer permanent and that his loan deal had expired.

=== Kryvbas Kryvyi Rih ===
On 9 January 2023, he signed for Kryvbas Kryvyi Rih.

== International career ==
On 15 June 2019, Beskorovaynyi won the 2019 FIFA U-20 World Cup with the Ukraine national U-20 team.

== Honours ==
Astana

- Kazakhstan Premier League: 2022

Ukraine U20

- FIFA U-20 World Cup: 2019

Individual

- Slovak Super Liga U-21 Team of the Season: 2019–20
