= 1992–93 Ukrainian Hockey Championship =

- League: Ukrainian Hockey Championship
- Sport: Ice hockey
- Number of teams: 7

Regular season
- Champions: Sokil Kyiv
- Runners-up: SVSM Kyiv

Ukrainian Hockey Championship seasons
- 1993–94 →

The 1992–93 Ukrainian Hockey Championship was the first season and annual national championship tournament created by the Ice Hockey Federation of Ukraine (FHU).

The championship consisted of two rounds. Six teams participated in the five-game first round of the championship. Five of teams were based on teams of sports schools and a junior squad of the national team. Teams of SVSM Kyiv and Jupiter advanced to the final round against the professional team Sokil Kyiv, who played in the International Hockey League. Sokil would go on to win the championship.

== First round ==
	Club	GP	W	T	L	GF:GA	Pts
1.	ShVSM Kyiv	5	4	1	0	30:6	9
2.	Jupiter Kharkiv	5	4	0	1	26:14	8
3.	KPI Kyiv	5	2	1	2	23:18	5
4.	Ukraine U-18	5	2	0	3	20:17	4
5.	NORD Donetsk	5	1	0	4	19:37	2
6.	OUFK Kharkiv	5	1	0	4	12:38	2

== Final round ==
	Club	GF:GA	Pts
1.	Sokil Kyiv	14:5	4
2.	ShVSM Kyiv	7:10	2
3.	Jupiter Kharkiv	3:9	0
