= Volodymyr Savoshko =

Ukrainian footballer (born 1995)

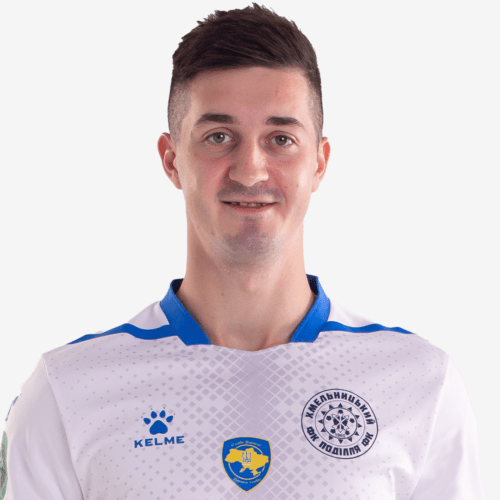
- Savoshko with Podillya Khmelnytskyi

Personal information
- Full name: Volodymyr Andriyovych Savoshko
- Date of birth: 25 May 1995 (age 31)
- Place of birth: Lviv, Ukraine
- Height: 1.74 m (5 ft 9 in)
- Position: Attacking midfielder

Team information
- Current team: Yunist Verkhnya Bilka

Youth career
- 2008–2012: Karpaty Lviv

Senior career*
| Years | Team | Apps | (Gls) |
| 2012–2017 | Karpaty Lviv | 0 | (0) |
| 2017–2018 | Lviv | 23 | (2) |
| 2018–2019 | Nyva Vinnytsia | 26 | (11) |
| 2019–2020 | Kalush | 30 | (5) |
| 2020 | Nyva Terebovlya | 2 | (1) |
| 2020–2021 | Polissya Zhytomyr | 13 | (0) |
| 2021–2022 | Podillya Khmelnytskyi | 34 | (3) |
| 2022 | Bischofshofen | 0 | (0) |
| 2022–2023 | Feniks Pidmonastyr | | |
| 2023– | Yunist Verkhnya Bilka | | |
- * Club domestic league appearances and goals as of 13 August 2022

Volodymyr Andriyovych Savoshko (Ukrainian: Володимир Андрійович Савошко; born 25 May 1995) is a Ukrainian professional footballer who plays as an attacking midfielder for Ukrainian club Yunist Verkhnya Bilka.

== Personal life ==
His brother Oleksandr Savoshko is also a professional footballer.
