= HC Jupiter Kharkiv =

Jupiter was an ice hockey team in Kharkiv, Ukraine. The club replaced the dissolved Soviet hockey team Dynamo Kharkov that participated in the Soviet competitions. After the 1992–93 season Jupiter was also dissolved and later replaced with Salamandra Kharkiv.

They participated in the Ukrainian Hockey Championship during the 1992-93 season. Jupiter finished in second place in the first round and qualified for the final round, where they finished in third and last place.
