= OUFK Kharkiv =

OUFK Kharkiv was an ice hockey team of the Kharkiv Regional College of Physical Culture and Sports in Kharkiv, Ukraine. OUFK abbreviation stands for the Regional College of Physical Culture (Ukrainian: Обласне училище фізкультури).

The team participated in the Ukrainian Hockey Championship during the 1992-93 season. They finished in sixth and last place in the first round with a record of one win and four losses, with 12 goals for and 38 against. OUFK failed to qualify for the final round of the championship.
