= Orest Kostyk =

Ukrainian footballer

Personal information
- Full name: Orest Mykhaylovych Kostyk
- Date of birth: 16 April 1999 (age 27)
- Place of birth: Zarvanytsya, Ukraine
- Height: 1.93 m (6 ft 4 in)
- Position: Goalkeeper

Team information
- Current team: Muras United
- Number: 12

Youth career
- 2011–2016: Karpaty Lviv

Senior career*
Years	Team	Apps	(Gls)
2016–2017	Opir Lviv	3	(0)
2017–2018	Sokil Zolochiv	4	(0)
2018	Veres Rivne	0	(0)
2018	Nyva Ternopil	0	(0)
2019–2022	Lviv	20	(0)
2022	→ Jonava (loan)	5	(0)
2022–2023	Metalist Kharkiv	12	(0)
2023	DFK Dainava	8	(0)
2024	Zhetysu	1	(0)
2025–	Muras United	34	(0)
- * Club domestic league appearances and goals as of 16 November 2025

Orest Mykhaylovych Kostyk (Ukrainian: Орест Михайлович Костик; born 16 April 1999) is a Ukrainian professional footballer who plays as a goalkeeper for Kyrgyz club Muras United.

== Career ==
Kostyk is a product of the Karpaty Lviv youth sportive school system.

After playing at the amateurs level, he was signed by professional Veres Rivne in 2018, but not made a debut for the main-squad of this team. Kostyk was signed by Lviv in February 2020 and made his debut for main-squad in the drawing away match against Rukh Lviv on 3 October 2020 in the Ukrainian Premier League.
