= Nazariy Nych =

Ukrainian footballer

Personal information
- Full name: Nazariy Olehovych Nych
- Date of birth: 19 February 1999 (age 27)
- Place of birth: Vidniv, Lviv Oblast, Ukraine
- Height: 1.84 m (6 ft 0 in)
- Position: Forward

Team information
- Current team: Ahrobiznes Volochysk
- Number: 15

Youth career
- 2015: Pokrova Lviv
- 2015–2016: Karpaty Lviv

Senior career*
Years	Team	Apps	(Gls)
2016	Lutsk	3	(2)
2017	Svityaz Shatsk	3	(3)
2017–2018	Volyn Lutsk	10	(1)
2018	Veres Rivne	0	(0)
2019–2023	Lviv	66	(5)
2023–2024	LNZ Cherkasy	12	(1)
2024	→ Viktoriya Sumy (loan)	10	(1)
2024–2025	Viktoriya Sumy	21	(1)
2025–2026	Feniks-Mariupol	13	(0)
2026–	Ahrobiznes Volochysk	12	(3)
- * Club domestic league appearances and goals as of 3 June 2026

Nazariy Olehovych Nych (Ukrainian: Назарій Олегович Нич; born 19 February 1999) is a Ukrainian professional footballer who plays as forward for Ahrobiznes Volochysk.

== Career ==
Nych is a product of the different youth systems around Lviv. He began his career at the amateur level until July 2017, when signed a contract with FC Volyn Lutsk in the Ukrainian First League.

In February 2019 he signed a contract with the Ukrainian Premier League team FC Lviv. He made his league debut for FC Lviv as a substitute against FC Kolos Kovalivka on 14 December 2019.
