= Renan Oliveira (footballer, born 1997) =

Brazilian footballer (born 1997)

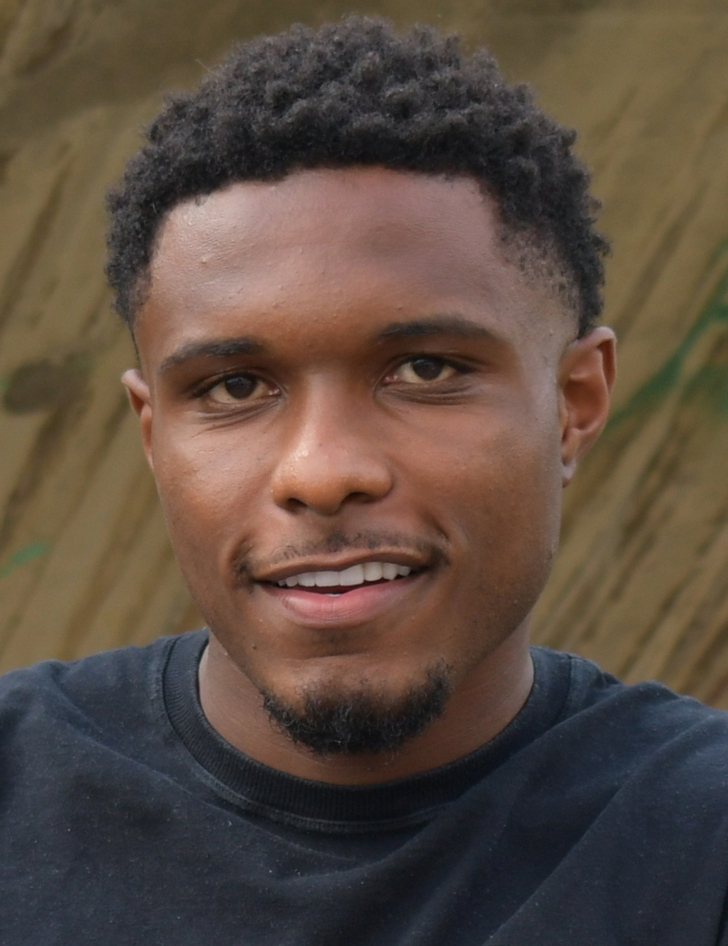
- Oliveira in 2023

Personal information
- Full name: Renan Abner do Carmo de Oliveira
- Date of birth: 8 May 1997 (age 29)
- Place of birth: São Paulo, Brazil
- Height: 1.86 m (6 ft 1 in)
- Position: Forward

Team information
- Current team: Kauno Žalgiris
- Number: 19

Youth career
- Juventus SP
- 2017–2018: São Bernardo

Senior career*
Years	Team	Apps	(Gls)
2017–2018	→ ViOn Zlaté Moravce (loan)	4	(0)
2018–2019	Mosta	9	(2)
2019	San Ġwann	12	(10)
2019–2021	Lviv	41	(9)
2020	→ Gil Vicente (loan)	10	(0)
2021–2023	Kolos Kovalivka	12	(1)
2022	→ Žalgiris (loan)	29	(17)
2023–2026	Sarajevo	70	(24)
2025	→ La Equidad (loan)	12	(2)
2026–	Kauno Žalgiris	10	(4)
- * Club domestic league appearances and goals as of 17 September 2026

Renan Abner do Carmo de Oliveira, known as Renan Oliveira (born 8 May 1997) is a Brazilian professional footballer who plays as a forward for Toplyga club Kauno Žalgiris.

== Career ==
Oliveira made his Ukrainian Premier League debut for Lviv on 30 July 2019 in a game against Desna Chernihiv. On 12 January 2023, he signed a two-year contract with Bosnian Premier League club Sarajevo.

== Career statistics ==
=== Club ===
As of match played 25 May 2026

Appearances and goals by club, season and competition
Club	Season	League			National cup (Note: Includes Slovak Cup, Ukrainian Cup, Taça de Portugal, Lithuanian Cup, Bosnia and Herzegovina Cup)		Continental		Total	
Club	Season	Division	Apps	Goals	Apps	Goals	Apps	Goals	Apps	Goals
ViOn Zlaté Moravce (loan)	2017–18	Slovak First League	4	0	1	1	—		5	1
Mosta	2018–19	Maltese Premier League	9	2	—		—		9	2
San Ġwann	2018–19	Maltese Challenge League	12	10	—		—		12	10
Lviv	2019–20	Ukrainian Premier League	27	6	2	2	—		29	8
Lviv	2020–21	Ukrainian Premier League	9	2	—		—		9	2
Lviv	2021–22	Ukrainian Premier League	5	1	—		—		5	1
Lviv	Total		41	9	2	2	—		43	11
Gil Vicente (loan)	2020–21	Primeira Liga	10	0	2	1	—		12	1
Kolos Kovalivka	2021–22	Ukrainian Premier League	12	1	1	0	—		13	1
Žalgiris (loan)	2022	A Lyga	29	17	5	3	14 (Note: Six appearances and one goal in UEFA Champions League, two appearances and one goal in UEFA Europa League; six appearances and one goal in UEFA Europa Conference League)	3	48	23
Sarajevo	2022–23	Bosnian Premier League	14	9	—		—		14	9
Sarajevo	2023–24	Bosnian Premier League	26	10	4	0	2 (Note: Appearance(s) in UEFA Europa Conference League)	1	32	11
Sarajevo	2024–25	Bosnian Premier League	16	3	—		3	1	19	4
Sarajevo	2025–26	Bosnian Premier League	14	2	1	2	2	0	17	4
Sarajevo	Total		70	24	5	2	7	2	82	28
La Equidad (loan)	2025	Categoría Primera A	12	2	0	0	—		12	2
Career total			199	65	17	9	21	5	236	79

== Honours ==
Žalgiris

- A Lyga: 2022
- Lithuanian Cup: 2022

Kauno Žalgiris

- Toplyga: 2026
- Lithuanian Cup: 2026

Individual

- A Lyga top goalscorer: 2022
