= Oleksandr Savoshko =

Ukrainian footballer (born 1998)

Personal information
- Full name: Oleksandr Andriyovych Savoshko
- Date of birth: 22 September 1998 (age 28)
- Place of birth: Lviv, Ukraine
- Height: 1.75 m (5 ft 9 in)
- Position: Right-back

Team information
- Current team: Kulykiv

Youth career
- 2011–2014: Lviv
- 2014: SKK Demnya
- 2014–2015: Lviv
- 2016–2017: Lviv

Senior career*
Years	Team	Apps	(Gls)
2015–2016	Oleksandriya	0	(0)
2016–2017	Lviv	17	(0)
2017–2018	Veres Rivne	0	(0)
2018	Lviv	10	(0)
2019	Yunist Hiyche	11	(0)
2019–2021	Lviv	0	(0)
2021–2022	Veres Rivne	3	(0)
2021	→ Uzhhorod (loan)	19	(0)
2022	→ Prykarpattia Ivano-Frankivsk (loan)	5	(0)
2023	Feniks Pidmonastyr	9	(2)
2023–	Kulykiv	58	(2)
- * Club domestic league appearances and goals as of 4 June 2026

Oleksandr Andriyovych Savoshko (Ukrainian: Олександр Андрійович Савошко; born 22 September 1998) is a Ukrainian professional footballer who plays as a right-back for Ukrainian club Kulykiv.

== Personal life ==
His brother Volodymyr Savoshko is also a professional footballer.
