= Enes Mahmutović =

Luxembourgish footballer (born 1997)

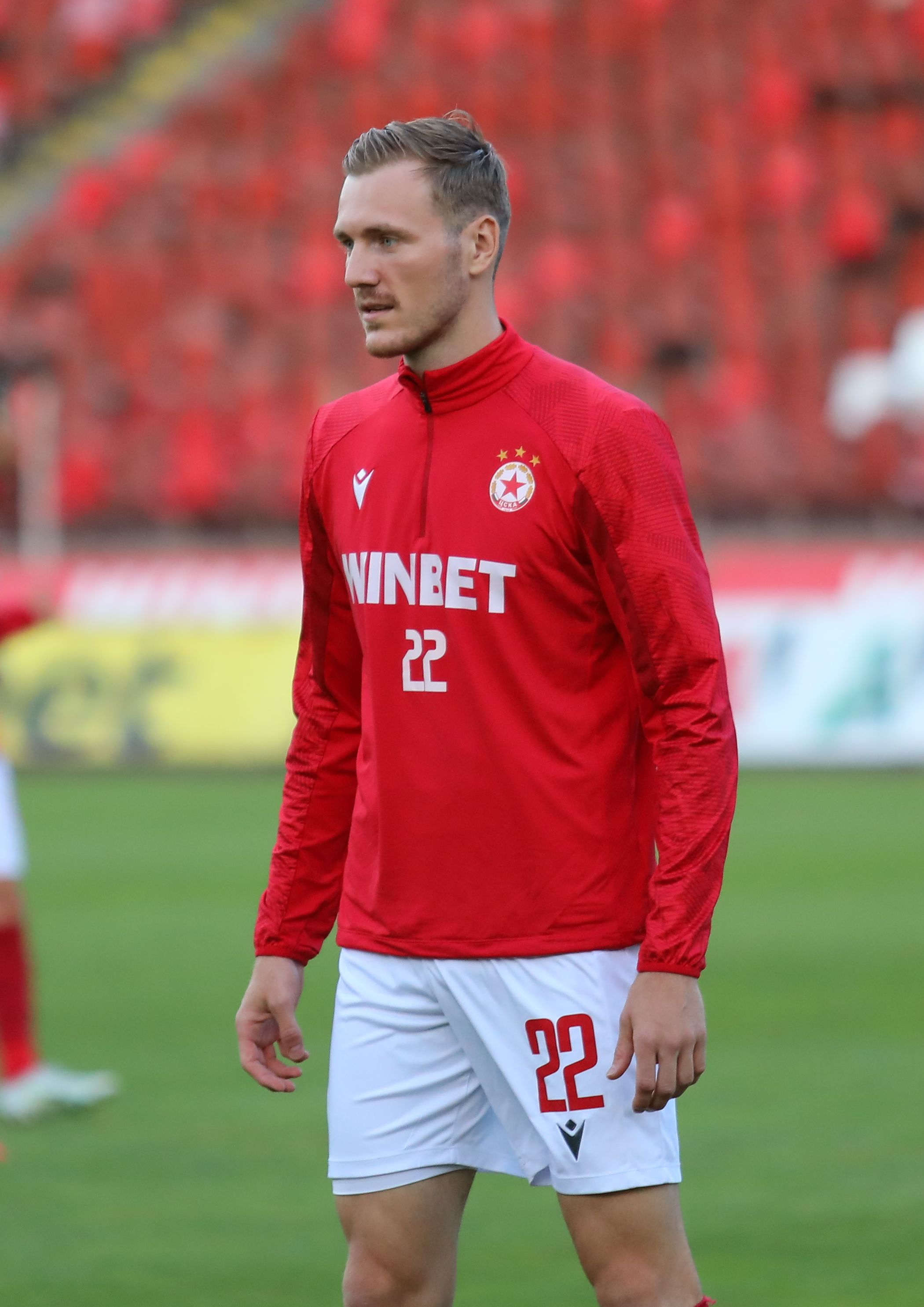
- Mahmutović with CSKA Sofia in 2022

Personal information
- Full name: Enes Mahmutović
- Date of birth: 22 May 1997 (age 29)
- Place of birth: Peja, FR Yugoslavia
- Height: 1.90 m (6 ft 3 in)
- Position: Centre back

Team information
- Current team: Batumi
- Number: 15

Senior career*
Years	Team	Apps	(Gls)
2014–2017	Fola Esch	25	(0)
2017–2020	Middlesbrough	0	(0)
2018–2019	→ Yeovil Town (loan)	4	(0)
2019–2020	→ MVV (loan)	15	(0)
2020–2022	Lviv	32	(1)
2022–2024	CSKA Sofia	38	(1)
2024–2026	NAC Breda	25	(0)
2026–	Batumi	2	(0)

International career^{‡}
2016	Luxembourg U21	4	(0)
2016–	Luxembourg	49	(0)
- * Club domestic league appearances and goals as of 20 September 2026 ‡ National team caps and goals as of 16 November 2026

Enes Mahmutović (born 22 May 1997) is a professional footballer who plays as a centre-back for Erovnuli Liga side Dinamo Batumi. Born in Kosovo, he plays for the Luxembourg national team.

== Club career ==
In the summer of 2014, Mahmutović signed his first professional senior contract with CS Fola Esch.

On 19 May 2017, it was announced that he had joined Championship club Middlesbrough for an undisclosed fee. Mahmutović made his debut for the club on 14 August 2018, in an EFL Cup tie with Notts County, scoring a headed goal in the 3–3 draw. In doing so, he became the first Luxembourger in history to score a professional goal in English football.

On 30 August 2018, Mahmutović joined League Two club Yeovil Town on loan until the end of the season. His time at Yeovil Town was cut short on 31 December 2018, with Mahmutović returning early to Middlesbrough upon the opening of the January transfer window after only playing a limited role at the League Two side.

On 1 July 2019, Mahmutović joined MVV Maastricht of the Dutch Eerste Divisie, going on to appear 16 times for the club across the season.

Middlesbrough announced that Mahmutović had been released by the club on 28 June 2020.

On 31 March 2022, Mahmutović signed a contract with Bulgarian club CSKA Sofia. He left the team in June 2024, upon the expiration of his contract.

On 29 July 2024, Mahmutović moved to NAC Breda in the Netherlands, signing a contract for two seasons with an option for third.

Following the expiration of his contract in the Netherlands, Mahmutović moved to Georgia, signing with Dinamo Batumi.

== International career ==
Mahmutović was born in Peja, FR Yugoslavia to an ethnic Bosniak family, and moved to Luxembourg at a young age. He was eligible for Montenegro and Luxembourg internationally, as well as Kosovo or Serbia, his birthplace. He made his international debut for Luxembourg on 13 November 2016, in a 1–3 loss to the Netherlands.

== Career statistics ==
=== Club ===
As of match played 24 April 2025.

Appearances and goals by club, season and competition
Club	Season	League			National Cup		League Cup		Other		Total	
Club	Season	Division	Apps	Goals	Apps	Goals	Apps	Goals	Apps	Goals	Apps	Goals
Fola Esch	2014–15	National Division	1	0	0	0	—		0	0	1	0
Fola Esch	2015–16	National Division	2	0	0	0	—		0	0	2	0
Fola Esch	2016–17	National Division	22	0	5	0	—		1 (Note: Appearance in the Europa League)	0	28	0
Fola Esch	Fola Esch total		25	0	5	0	0	0	1	0	31	0
Middlesbrough	2017–18	Championship	0	0	0	0	0	0	0	0	0	0
Middlesbrough	2018–19	Championship	0	0	0	0	2	1	0	0	2	1
Middlesbrough	2019–20	Championship	0	0	0	0	0	0	0	0	0	0
Middlesbrough	Middlesbrough total		0	0	0	0	2	1	0	0	2	1
Yeovil Town (loan)	2018–19	League Two	4	0	0	0	—		1 (Note: Appearance in the EFL Trophy)	1	5	1
MVV Maastricht (loan)	2019–20	Eerste Divisie	15	0	1	0	—		—		16	0
FC Lviv	2020–21	Ukrainian Premier League	20	1	0	0	—		—		20	1
FC Lviv	2021–22	Ukrainian Premier League	12	0	1	0	—		—		13	0
FC Lviv	Total		32	1	1	0	—		—		33	1
CSKA Sofia	2022–23	First League	18	1	1	0	—		1 (Note: Appearance in the UEFA Europa Conference League)	0	20	1
CSKA Sofia	2023–24	First League	20	0	2	0	—		2 (Note: Appearances in the UEFA Europa Conference League)	0	24	0
CSKA Sofia	Total		38	1	3	0	—		3	0	44	1
NAC Breda	2024–25	Eredivisie	10	0	1	0	—		—		11	0
Career total			124	2	11	0	2	1	5	1	141	4

=== International ===
As of match played 16 November 2026

Appearances and goals by national team and year
National team	Year	Apps	Goals
Luxembourg	2016	1	0
Luxembourg	2017	3	0
Luxembourg	2018	6	0
Luxembourg	2019	1	0
Luxembourg	2020	2	0
Luxembourg	2021	7	0
Luxembourg	2022	3	0
Luxembourg	2023	7	0
Luxembourg	2024	6	0
Luxembourg	2025	5	0
Luxembourg	2026	8	0
Total		49	0
