= Serhiy Topchiy =

Ukrainian footballer

Personal information
- Full name: Serhiy Oleksandrovych Topchiy
- Date of birth: 10 July 2001 (age 25)
- Place of birth: Pervomaisk, Mykolaiv Oblast, Ukraine
- Height: 1.86 m (6 ft 1 in)
- Position: Midfielder

Youth career
- 2014–2015: UFK Kharkiv
- 2015–2016: Vostok Kharkiv
- 2016–2018: UFK Kharkiv

Senior career*
Years	Team	Apps	(Gls)
2018–2019	Olimpik Donetsk	0	(0)
2019	MFA Mukacheve (amateurs)	3	(0)
2019–2021	Lviv	1	(0)
- * Club domestic league appearances and goals as of 20 September 2021

Serhiy Oleksandrovych Topchiy (Ukrainian: Сергій Олександрович Топчій; born 10 July 2001) is a professional Ukrainian football midfielder who played for FC Lviv.

== Career ==
Topchiy is a product of the different youth sportive school systems from Kharkiv.

In August 2019 Topchiy signed a contract with the Ukrainian Premier League's FC Lviv. He made his debut for FC Lviv as a second half-time substituted player in the losing away match against SC Dnipro-1 on 2 April 2021 in the Ukrainian Premier League.
