= Maksym Mudryi =

Ukrainian footballer (born 2003)

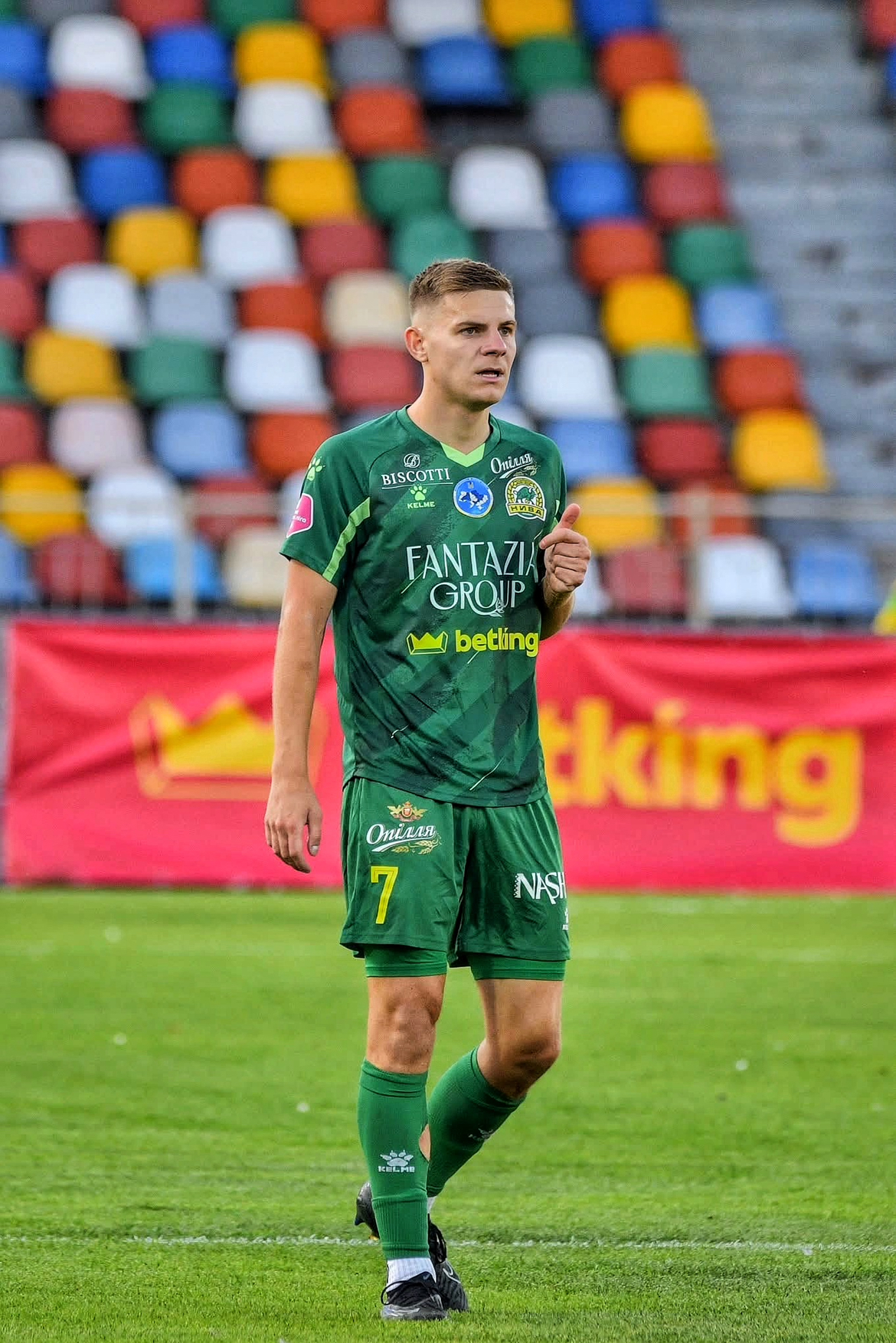
- Mudryi playing for Nyva Ternopil in 2025.

Personal information
- Full name: Maksym Ivanovych Mudryi
- Date of birth: 5 May 2003 (age 23)
- Place of birth: Lviv, Ukraine
- Height: 1.80 m (5 ft 11 in)
- Position: Central midfielder

Team information
- Current team: Nyva Ternopil
- Number: 7

Youth career
- 2012–2016: Rukh Vynnyky
- 2016–2019: Lviv
- 2019: Yunist Verkhnya Bilka
- 2019: Lviv

Senior career*
Years	Team	Apps	(Gls)
2019–2023	Lviv	1	(0)
2023–26	Nyva Ternopil	58	(0)
2025-26	FC Nyva-2 Ternopil	7	(0)
2026-	FC Kulykiv-Bilka	1	(0)
- * Club domestic league appearances and goals as of 23/10/26 @ 12:00(AEST)

Maksym Ivanovych Mudryi (Ukrainian: Максим Іванович Мудрий; born 5 May 2003) is a Ukrainian professional footballer who plays as a central midfielder for Ukrainian First League club Nyva Ternopil.

== Career ==
=== Lviv ===
He made his professional debut for Lviv in the losing Ukrainian Cup match against Vorskla Poltava on 30 September 2020.
