= Yuriy Kravchuk =

Ukrainian footballer

Personal information
- Full name: Yuriy Vyacheslavovych Kravchuk
- Date of birth: 6 April 1994 (age 32)
- Place of birth: Odesa, Ukraine
- Height: 1.92 m (6 ft 4 in)
- Position: Centre-back

Team information
- Current team: Viktoriya Sumy
- Number: 5

Youth career
- 2007–2011: Chornomorets Odesa

Senior career*
Years	Team	Apps	(Gls)
2011	Chornomorets-2 Odesa	12	(0)
2012	SKA Odesa	15	(0)
2014	Enerhiya Nova Kakhovka	8	(1)
2015–2016	Zhemchuzhyna Odesa	18	(1)
2017–2020	Hirnyk-Sport Horishni Plavni	88	(3)
2020–2021	→ Lviv (loan)	15	(2)
2021–2023	Metalist Kharkiv	2	(0)
2021–2022	→ Hirnyk-Sport Horishni Plavni (loan)	18	(2)
2022–2023	→ Mynai (loan)	16	(2)
2023	Mynai	9	(0)
2024–	Viktoriya Sumy	24	(0)
- * Club domestic league appearances and goals as of 10 June 2025

Yuriy Vyacheslavovych Kravchuk (Ukrainian: Юрій Вячеславович Кравчук; born 6 April 1994) is a Ukrainian professional footballer who plays as a centre-back for Viktoriya Sumy.
