= Yohana Mkomola =

Tanzanian footballer

Personal information
- Full name: Yohana Oscar Mkomola
- Date of birth: 18 April 2000 (age 26)
- Place of birth: Songea, Ruvuma Region, Tanzania
- Height: 1.77 m (5 ft 10 in)
- Position: Forward

Senior career*
Years	Team	Apps	(Gls)
2016–2017	Étoile Sportive du Sahel	0	(0)
2017–2019	Young Africans		
2019–2022	Vorskla Poltava	0	(0)
2020–2021	→ Inhulets Petrove (loan)	19	(2)
2022	→ Hirnyk-Sport Horishni Plavni (loan)	0	(0)

International career^{‡}
2017	Tanzania U17	?	(?)
2017–	Tanzania	2	(0)
- * Club domestic league appearances and goals as of 12 September 2022 ‡ National team caps and goals as of 10 February 2022

Yohana Oscar Mkomola (born 18 April 2000) is a Tanzanian professional football forward.

== Club career ==
He was born in the Tanzanian city of Songea. At a young age he went abroad, signing a contract with the Tunisian football club Étoile Sportive du Sahel. He spent one season in this team. On the eve of the start of the 2017/18 season, he returned to his homeland, where he became a player of the club Young Africans. In 2018, he played two matches for Young Africans in the CAF Confederations Cup. In the 2018/19 season, together with the team, he became a runner-up of the Tanzanian Premier League.

In September 2019 he signed contract with the Ukrainian Premier League club Vorskla. He played for this club in the Ukrainian Premier League Reserves.

In 2020, he was sent on loan to Inhulets Petrove.

== International career ==
He made his debut for the Tanzania national football team on 9 December 2017 in the lost (2:1) match of a Group A of the CECAFA Cup against the Rwanda. Mkomola came on the pitch at the 75th minute of game, replacing Yahya Zayd. He played 2 matches in this tournament.
