= Álvaro Vieira =

Brazilian footballer (born 1995)

Personal information
- Full name: Álvaro Luis Tavares Vieira
- Date of birth: 10 March 1995 (age 31)
- Place of birth: São Paulo, Brazil
- Height: 1.72 m (5 ft 8 in)
- Position: Forward

Team information
- Current team: Petrolina

Youth career
- 2015: ECUS

Senior career*
Years	Team	Apps	(Gls)
2017	União Mogi	21	(7)
2018	Monte Azul	9	(0)
2018	Francana	5	(1)
2019–2023	Lviv	61	(8)
2020	→ Keşla (loan)	6	(0)
2022	→ Dila Gori (loan)	12	(0)
2023	→ São Luiz (loan)	5	(0)
2024	Inhulets Petrove	4	(0)
2025–	Petrolina	6	(0)
- * Club domestic league appearances and goals as of 17 March 2025

Álvaro Luis Tavares Vieira (born 10 March 1995) is a Brazilian football player who plays for Petrolina.

== Club career ==
He made his Ukrainian Premier League debut for FC Lviv on 23 February 2019 in a game against FC Chornomorets Odesa.

On 30 November 2020, Keşla announced the end of Tavares' loan deal by mutual consent.
