= Maks Čelić =

Croatian footballer

Maks Ćelić
Personal information
- Full name: Maks Juraj Ćelić
- Date of birth: 8 March 1996 (age 30)
- Place of birth: Zagreb, Croatia
- Height: 1.91 m (6 ft 3 in)
- Position: Centre back

Team information
- Current team: Chungnam Asan
- Number: 40

Youth career
- –2011: Dinamo Zagreb
- 2010–2011: → NK Zagreb (loan)
- 2011–2012: HASK Zagreb
- 2012–2013: Inter Zaprešić
- 2014: Varaždin
- 2014–2015: MSV Duisburg

Senior career*
Years	Team	Apps	(Gls)
2016	HASK Zagreb	0	(0)
2016–2019	Varaždin	43	(2)
2019–2020	Gorica	8	(0)
2020	Lviv	4	(1)
2021	Varaždin	14	(0)
2021–2022	Messina	29	(1)
2023	Beroe	14	(0)
2023–2024	Borac Banja Luka	30	(2)
2024	Hapoel Tel Aviv	0	(0)
2025	Borac Banja Luka	5	(0)
2025–2026	FK Csíkszereda	9	(0)
2026–	Chungnam Asan	3	(0)
- * Club domestic league appearances and goals as of 6 August 2026

Maks Juraj Ćelić (born 8 March 1996) is a Croatian professional footballer who plays as a centre back for K League 2 club Chungnam Asan.

== Career ==
At the age of 18, Juraj Čelić signed for German second division side MSV Duisburg after Bayer 04 Leverkusen, who he was supposed to join, dissolved their reserves. After failing to make an appearance for MSV Duisburg, he almost joined GNK Dinamo Zagreb, Croatia's most successful club, but the transfer never happened.

In 2017, Juraj Čelić signed for NK Varaždin, helping them achieve promotion from the Croatian third division to the top flight.

In 2020, he signed for Lviv in the Ukrainian top flight.

On 24 August 2021, he signed with Italian Serie C club ACR Messina.

In early 2023, Čelić joined Bulgarian club Beroe where he remained until the end of the season.

== Honours ==
Varaždin

- Druga HNL: 2018–19

Borac Banja Luka

- Bosnian Premier League: 2023–24
- Bosnian Cup runner-up: 2023–24
- Bosnian Supercup runner-up: 2024
