= Volodymyr Yakimets =

Ukrainian footballer

Personal information
- Full name: Volodymyr Ivanovych Yakimets
- Date of birth: 3 March 1998 (age 28)
- Place of birth: Livchytsi, Lviv Oblast, Ukraine
- Height: 1.73 m (5 ft 8 in)
- Position: Midfielder

Youth career
- 200?–2015: Lviv
- 2015–2017: Shakhtar Donetsk

Senior career*
Years	Team	Apps	(Gls)
2017–2019	Shakhtar Donetsk	0	(0)
2019–2020	Karpaty Lviv	9	(0)
2020–2022	Lviv	34	(2)
2022–2025	Kryvbas Kryvyi Rih	19	(0)

International career^{‡}
2015	Ukraine U18	4	(0)
2016–2017	Ukraine U19	3	(0)
2018–2020	Ukraine U21	7	(0)
- * Club domestic league appearances and goals as of 15 July 2025 ‡ National team caps and goals as of 17 August 2022

Volodymyr Yakimets (Ukrainian: Володимир Іванович Якімець; born 3 March 1998) is a Ukrainian professional footballer who plays as a midfielder.

== Career ==
Born in Zhydachiv Raion, Yakimets is a product of the FC Lviv School System. Still, at age 17, he transferred to FC Shakhtar and played for it in the Ukrainian Premier League Reserves and Under 19 Championship during 3 seasons. In July 2019, he signed a three-year deal with another Ukrainian Premier League club, FC Karpaty.

He made his debut for FC Karpaty as a main-squad player in a home losing game against FC Dynamo Kyiv on 31 July 2019 in the Ukrainian Premier League.
