= Maroine Mihoubi =

French footballer (born 1999)

Personal information
- Date of birth: 26 July 1999 (age 27)
- Place of birth: Aubagne, France
- Height: 1.87 m (6 ft 2 in)
- Position: Centre-back

Team information
- Current team: Vihren
- Number: 16

Youth career
- –2017: AS Monaco

Senior career*
Years	Team	Apps	(Gls)
2017–2018	Nîmes B	1	(0)
2018–2019	Stade Tunisien	19	(0)
2020	Aubagne	4	(0)
2020–2021	Lviv	18	(1)
2022	Jammerbugt	8	(0)
2023–2026	Tukums 2000	74	(3)
2026–	Vihren	8	(0)

International career
2018	Tunisia U20	2	(0)
2018	Tunisia U21	1	(0)
- * Club domestic league appearances and goals as of 11 June 2026

Maroine Mihoubi (born 26 July 1999) is a professional footballer who currently plays as a centre-back for Bulgarian Second League side Vihren. Born in France, he has represented Tunisia internationally.

== Personal life ==
Mihoubi holds both French and Tunisian nationalities.

== Career statistics ==
=== Club ===
As of 1 June 2019.

Club	Season	League			Cup		Continental		Other		Total	
Club	Season	Division	Apps	Goals	Apps	Goals	Apps	Goals	Apps	Goals	Apps	Goals
Nîmes B	2017–18	Championnat National 3	1	0	0	0	–		0	0	1	0
Nîmes B	2018–19	Championnat National 2	0	0	0	0	–		0	0	0	0
Nîmes B	Total		1	0	0	0	0	0	0	0	1	0
Stade Tunisien	2018–19	CLP-1	16	0	0	0	0	0	0	0	16	0
Career total			17	0	0	0	0	0	0	0	17	0
