= Kharkiv Regional College of Physical Culture and Sports =

Sports college in Kharkiv, Ukraine

Coordinates: 50.0508°N 36.2747°E

Kharkiv Regional College of Physical Culture and Sports (Ukrainian: Харківське обласне вище училище фізичної культури та спорту) also known as OUFK or KhOVUFKS is a sports college in Kharkiv that provides sports reserve for Olympic sports and is subordinated to the Kharkiv City Council. Note that in Kharkiv are two colleges of Physical Culture, one belongs to the Kharkiv Oblast, another is administered directly by the Government of Ukraine through the Ministry of Sports.

The college was created in 1986 as the Kharkiv city boarding school in winter sports. In 1997-2002 it was known as the Regional Humanitarian College (Ukrainian: обласне вище гуманітарне училище). The college is specialized in following sports: badminton, basketball, biathlon, volleyball, handball, table tennis, cross-country skiing, powerlifting, athletics (short track), female association football, chess. Upon successful completion a college graduate of the school receives an undergraduate diploma in "Physical development".

After fall of the Soviet Union, the college hockey team OUFK Kharkiv participated in the Ukrainian national hockey tournaments.

== See also ==
- National University of Physical Education and Sport of Ukraine
