= Yuriy Zakharkiv =

Ukrainian footballer

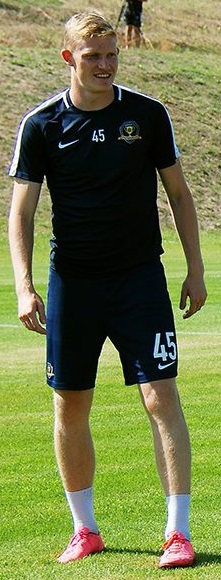
- Zaharkiv in 2017

Personal information
- Full name: Yuriy Romanovych Zakharkiv
- Date of birth: 21 March 1996 (age 30)
- Place of birth: Ternopil, Ukraine
- Height: 1.89 m (6 ft 2 in)
- Position: Forward

Team information
- Current team: Ahrobiznes Volochysk
- Number: 45

Youth career
- 2009–2011: Youth Sportive School Ternopil
- 2011–2013: Karpaty Lviv

Senior career*
Years	Team	Apps	(Gls)
2013–2016	Karpaty Lviv	1	(0)
2017	Ternopil	11	(2)
2017	Dnipro-1	15	(6)
2018	Olimpik Donetsk	3	(0)
2018	Atlantas Klaipėda	8	(0)
2019	Zemplín Michalovce	6	(2)
2019	→ Slavoj Trebišov (loan)	1	(0)
2019–2020	Khujand	7	(1)
2020	Jelgava	16	(5)
2020–2021	Lviv	8	(0)
2021	Zhetysu	0	(0)
2021–	Ahrobiznes Volochysk	3	(0)
- * Club domestic league appearances and goals as of 16 October 2021

Yuriy Romanovych Zakharkiv (Ukrainian: Юрій Романович Захарків; born 21 March 1996) is a Ukrainian football striker who plays for Ahrobiznes Volochysk.

== Career ==
Zakharkiv is the product of the Ternopil and Karpaty Lviv School Systems. He made his debut for FC Karpaty in a game against Illichivets Mariupol on 2 May 2015 in Ukrainian Premier League.

In August 2018 he became a member of Lithuanian Atlantas Klaipėda and play in A lyga.
