= Yaroslav Bohunov =

Ukrainian professional footballer

Personal information
- Full name: Yaroslav Hennadiyovych Bohunov
- Date of birth: 4 September 1993 (age 33)
- Place of birth: Luhansk, Ukraine
- Height: 1.69 m (5 ft 7 in)
- Position: Forward

Team information
- Current team: Druzhba-Kozaky Nizhyn
- Number: 2

Youth career
- 200?–2005: Shakhtar Yubileynyi
- 2005–2008: Olimpik Donetsk
- 2008: Dnipro Dnipropetrovsk
- 2009–2010: Metalist Kharkiv

Senior career*
Years	Team	Apps	(Gls)
2010–2011	Metalist Kharkiv	0	(0)
2012	Shchastia		
2013–2016	Belshina Bobruisk	56	(9)
2017	Naftan Novopolotsk	9	(0)
2017	Krumkachy Minsk	14	(2)
2018	Polissya Zhytomyr	4	(0)
2018–2019	NFK Minsk	17	(6)
2019–2020	Lviv	31	(1)
2021	Juniors Shpytky	?	(?)
2022–2023	Dinaz Vyshhorod	14	(4)
2023	Lviv	14	(2)
2023–2024	Inhulets Petrove	32	(7)
2025–2026	Viktoriya Sumy	16	(0)
2026–	Druzhba-Kozaky Nizhyn	0	(0)
- * Club domestic league appearances and goals as of 27 December 2025

Yaroslav Hennadiyovych Bohunov (Ukrainian: Ярослав Геннадійович Богунов; born 4 September 1993) is a Ukrainian professional footballer who plays for Druzhba-Kozaky Nizhyn.

== Career ==
On 6 August 2020, the Football Federation of Belarus banned Bohunov from Belarusian football for two years for his involvement in the match fixing. In January 2023 he moved to Lviv.
