= Serhiy Litovchenko (footballer, born 1987) =

Ukrainian footballer

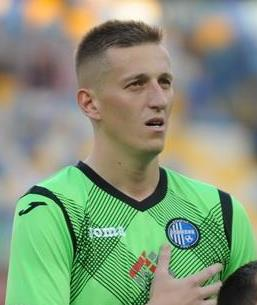
- Litovchenko with Olimpik Donetsk in 2015

Personal information
- Full name: Serhiy Serhiyovych Litovchenko
- Date of birth: 4 October 1987 (age 39)
- Place of birth: Kharkiv, Soviet Union (now Ukraine)
- Height: 1.92 m (6 ft 4 in)
- Position: Goalkeeper

Team information
- Current team: SV Gratwein-Straßengel

Youth career
- 2002–2005: Arsenal Kharkiv

Senior career*
Years	Team	Apps	(Gls)
2005–2008	Arsenal Kharkiv	38	(0)
2007	→ Hazovyk-KhGV Kharkiv (loan)	3	(0)
2009–2010	Feniks-Illichovets Kalinine	26	(0)
2011–2015	Volyn Lutsk	18	(0)
2012	→ Naftovyk-Ukrnafta Okhtyrka (loan)	10	(0)
2015	Helios Kharkiv	11	(0)
2015–2016	Olimpik Donetsk	7	(0)
2016	Zugdidi	9	(0)
2017	Dinamo Tbilisi	26	(0)
2018	Kapaz	14	(0)
2018–2019	Chornomorets Odesa	24	(0)
2019	Dinamo Tbilisi	0	(0)
2020	Volyn Lutsk	9	(0)
2020	Lviv	2	(0)
2021	Akzhayik	19	(0)
2022–2023	Maktaaral	20	(0)
2023	Fratria		
2024–	SV Gratwein-Straßengel		
- * Club domestic league appearances and goals as of 8 November 2022

Serhiy Serhiyovych Litovchenko (Ukrainian: Сергій Сергійович Літовченко; born 4 October 1987) is a Ukrainian retired professional footballer who played as a goalkeeper.

== Career ==
Litovchenko's first professional club was FC Arsenal Kharkiv. Next he played in the Ukrainian First League and then signed a contract with FC Volyn Lutsk in the Ukrainian Premier League. He made his Premier League debut entering as a second-half substitute against FC Shakhtar Donetsk on 6 August 2012.

== Honours ==
Dinamo Tbilisi

- Erovnuli Liga: 2019
