= Maksym Hrysyo =

Ukrainian footballer

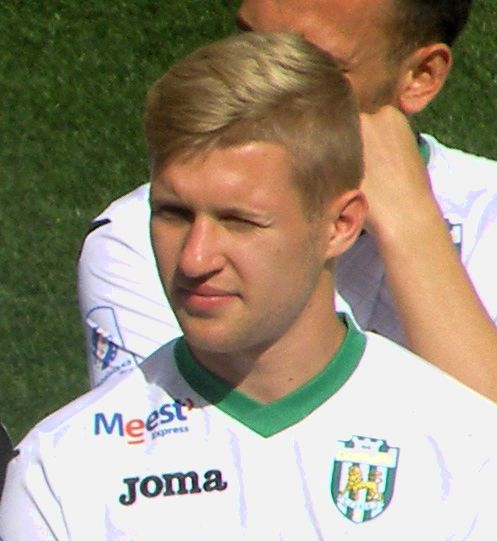

Personal information
- Full name: Maksym Yosypovych Hrysyo
- Date of birth: 14 May 1996 (age 30)
- Place of birth: Chyshky, Lviv Oblast, Ukraine
- Height: 1.54 m (5 ft 1 in)
- Position: Midfielder

Team information
- Current team: Obolon Kyiv
- Number: 11

Youth career
- 200?–2007: Rukh Vynnyky
- 2007–2009: Lviv
- 2009–2013: UFK-Karpaty Lviv

Senior career*
Years	Team	Apps	(Gls)
2013–2019	Karpaty Lviv	28	(2)
2017–2019	→ Rukh Vynnyky (loan)	43	(2)
2020	Cherkashchyna	2	(0)
2020–2023	Lviv	60	(2)
2023	Chornomorets Odesa	1	(0)
2024–	Obolon Kyiv	29	(0)

International career
2016	Ukraine U20	2	(0)
2016	Ukraine U21	1	(0)
2019	Ukraine (students)		
- * Club domestic league appearances and goals as of 24 December 2025

Maksym Yosypovych Hrysyo (Ukrainian: Максим Йосипович Грисьо; born 14 May 1996) is a Ukrainian professional footballer who plays for Obolon Kyiv.

== Career ==
Hrysyo is a product of the UFK Lviv School System. He then played for FC Karpaty Lviv in the Ukrainian Premier League Reserves and Under 19 Championship for three seasons.

He made his senior debut for FC Karpaty as a starter against FC Stal Kamianske on 23 July 2016 in the Ukrainian Premier League.
