= Oleksandr Ilyushchenkov =

Ukrainian footballer

Oleksandr Ilyuschenkov
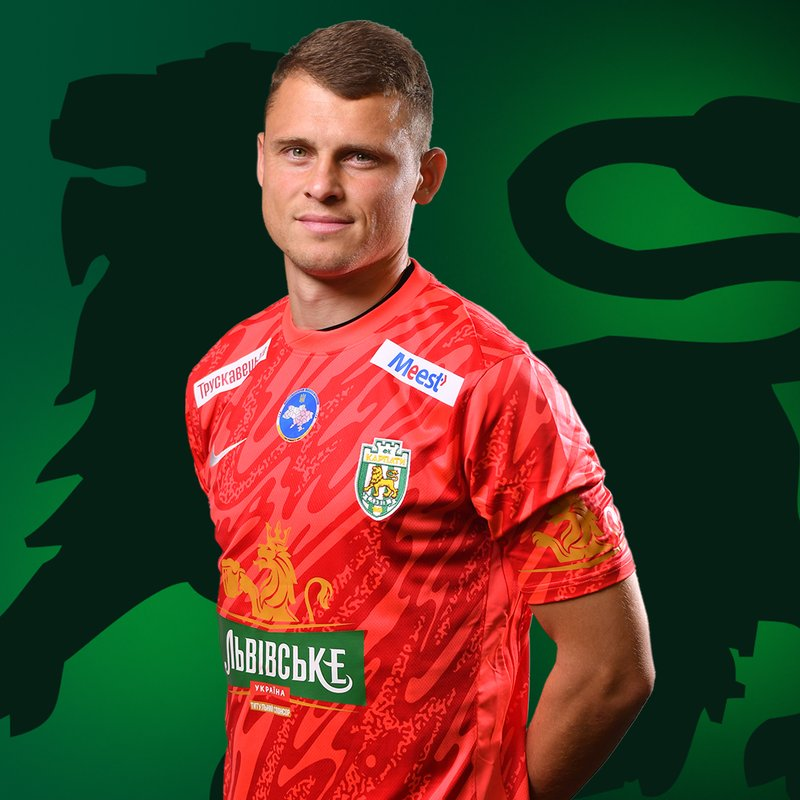
- Oleksandr Ilyushchenkov at Karpaty Lviv in 2024

Personal information
- Full name: Oleksandr Andriyovych Ilyuschenkov
- Date of birth: 23 March 1990 (age 36)
- Place of birth: Ternopil, Ukrainian SSR
- Height: 1.82 m (6 ft 0 in)
- Position: Goalkeeper

Team information
- Current team: Karpaty Lviv
- Number: 31

Youth career
- 2003–2007: Youth Sportive School Ternopil

Senior career*
| Years | Team | Apps | (Gls) |
| 2008–2010 | Nyva Ternopil | 18 | (0) |
| 2010–2011 | Enerhetyk Burshtyn | 12 | (0) |
| 2011–2015 | Karpaty Lviv | 21 | (0) |
| 2015 | Tiraspol | 0 | (0) |
| 2016 | Metalist Kharkiv | 3 | (0) |
| 2016 | Sioni Bolnisi | 2 | (0) |
| 2017 | Veres Rivne | 10 | (0) |
| 2017–2020 | Rukh Lviv | 44 | (0) |
| 2021–2023 | Lviv | 31 | (0) |
| 2023– | Karpaty Lviv | 8 | (0) |

International career
| 2012 | Ukraine U21 | 1 | (0) |
- * Club domestic league appearances and goals as of 14 June 2023

Oleksandr Ilyuschenkov (Ukrainian: Олександр Андрійович Ільющенков; born 23 March 1990) is a Ukrainian professional footballer who plays as a goalkeeper for Karpaty Lviv.

== Career ==
Ilyuschenkov is the product of the Ternopil academy system.

In July 2011, he signed a contract with FC Karpaty in the Ukrainian Premier League.

In December 2022, he signed a two-year contract with Karpaty Lviv.

== Honours ==
Nyva Ternopil

- Ukrainian Second League: 2008–09
