= Ihor Koshman =

Ukrainian footballer

Personal information
- Full name: Ihor Serhiyovych Koshman
- Date of birth: 7 March 1995 (age 31)
- Place of birth: Kremenchuk, Ukraine
- Height: 1.69 m (5 ft 7 in)
- Position: Attacking midfielder

Team information
- Current team: Olimpiya Savyntsi
- Number: 28

Youth career
- 2008–2012: Kremin Kremenchuk

Senior career*
Years	Team	Apps	(Gls)
2012–2014	Tavriya Simferopol	7	(0)
2014–2015	Metalurh Donetsk	1	(0)
2016	Metalist Kharkiv	1	(0)
2017	Celje	1	(0)
2017–2018	Helios Kharkiv	24	(3)
2018	Samtredia	17	(1)
2019	Metalist 1925 Kharkiv	8	(0)
2019–2020	Kremin Kremenchuk	10	(0)
2020	Shevardeni-1906 Tbilisi	2	(1)
2020–2021	Lviv	9	(0)
2021	TJK Legion	8	(1)
2021	Kremin Kremenchuk	13	(0)
2022	Bukovyna Chernivtsi	5	(0)
2023	Nyva Buzova	5	(0)
2023–	Olimpiya Savyntsi	0	(0)
- * Club domestic league appearances and goals as of 21 April 2023

Ihor Serhiyovych Koshman (Ukrainian: Ігор Сергійович Кошман; born 7 March 1995) is a Ukrainian professional footballer who plays as an attacking midfielder for Olimpiya Savyntsi.

== Career ==
Koshman is the product of the Kremin Kremenchuk academy. He made his debut for Tavriya Simferopol as a substitute against Metalurh Zaporizhzhia on 28 March 2014 in Ukrainian Premier League.

Koshman throughout his career has also played for: Metalurh Donetsk, Metalist Kharkiv, Helios Kharkiv, Metalist 1925 Kharkiv, Lviv, Bukovyna Chernivtsi, Nyva Buzova. He also played for Celje in Slovenia, Samtredia and Shevardeni-1906 Tbilisi in Georgia and TJK Legion in Estonia.
