= Ernest Antwi =

Ghanaian footballer (born 1995)

Personal information
- Full name: Master Ernest Antwi Nyarko
- Date of birth: 9 September 1995 (age 31)
- Place of birth: Accra, Ghana
- Height: 1.75 m (5 ft 9 in)
- Position: Forward

Team information
- Current team: Al Rams
- Number: 10

Senior career*
Years	Team	Apps	(Gls)
2013–2014	Tudu Mighty Jets		
2014	Farense	0	(0)
2015	Oliveira do Hospital	11	(2)
2015	Desportivo das Aves	11	(0)
2016–2019	União de Leiria	90	(32)
2019–2020	Rukh Lviv	25	(4)
2020–2022	Lviv	31	(4)
2022	→ Najran (loan)		
2022–2023	Aktobe	7	(0)
2023–2024	Doxa Katokopias	25	(0)
2024	Rajasthan United		
2025	Al-Rustaq	11	(1)
2025–	Al Rams	10	(3)
- * Club domestic league appearances and goals

Master Ernest Antwi Nyarko, known as Ernest Antwi or Ernest Nyarko (born 9 September 1995), is a Ghanaian professional footballer plays for Al Rams as a forward.

== Club career ==
He made his professional debut in the Segunda Liga for Desportivo das Aves on 8 August 2015 in a game against Sporting Covilhã.

In July 2017, Antwi went on trial with Russian Premier League side FC Rostov.

Antwi moved to Kazakhstan Premier League club Aktobe, but was released from his contract on 5 January 2023.
