= 2019–20 FC Karpaty Lviv season =

Karpaty Lviv
2018–19 season
- President: Petro Dyminsky
- Manager: Oleksandr Chyzhevskyi (until 3 September 2019); Roman Sanzhar (since 3 September 2019)
- Stadium: Ukraina Stadium, Lviv
- Premier League: 12th (expelled)
- Ukrainian Cup: Round of 20 (1/16)
- Top goalscorer: League: Yehor Nazaryna (5); All: Yehor Nazaryna (5)
- Highest home attendance: 12,135 vs Dynamo; 31 July 2019
- Lowest home attendance: 754 vs Olimpik; 24 November 2019
Home colours	Away colours	Third colours

The 2019–20 season was 27th season in the top Ukrainian football league for FC Karpaty Lviv. Karpaty has competed in Premier League, Ukrainian Cup.

== Players ==
=== Squad information ===
As of 27 June 2020

Squad no.	Name	Nationality	Position	Date of birth (age)
Goalkeepers
1	Volodymyr Makhankov	(Ukraine)	GK	29 October 1997 (age 29)
31	Oleh Kudryk (on loan from Shakhtar Donetsk)	(Ukraine)	GK	17 October 1996 (age 30)
Defenders
24	Vladyslav Dubinchak ^{List B} (on loan from Dynamo Kyiv)	(Ukraine)	DF	1 July 1998 (age 28)
30	Andro Giorgadze	(Georgia (country))	DF	3 May 1996 (age 30)
44	Vasyl Pryima	(Ukraine)	DF	10 June 1991 (age 35)
49	Roman Slyva ^{List B}	(Ukraine)	DF	23 September 2000 (age 26)
64	Oleh Veremiyenko ^{List B}	(Ukraine)	DF	13 February 1999 (age 27)
82	Denys Slyusar ^{List B}	(Ukraine)	DF	27 May 2002 (age 24)
Midfielders
7	Dmytro Klyots	(Ukraine)	MF	15 April 1996 (age 30)
8	Oleksiy Khakhlyov ^{List B}	(Ukraine)	MF	6 February 1999 (age 27)
14	Artem Kozak ^{List B}	(Ukraine)	MF	28 May 1998 (age 28)
20	Volodymyr Tanchyk	(Ukraine)	MF	17 October 1991 (age 35)
21	Abukar Mohamed ^{List B} (on loan from Lazio)	(Somalia) (Finland)	MF	1 January 1999 (age 27)
22	Yuriy Tlumak ^{List B}	(Ukraine)	MF	11 July 2002 (age 24)
33	Volodymyr Yakimets ^{List B}	(Ukraine)	MF	3 March 1998 (age 28)
41	Hennadiy Pasich	(Ukraine)	MF	13 July 1993 (age 33)
70	Maksym Khlan ^{List B}	(Ukraine)	MF	27 January 2003 (age 23)
74	Oleksiy Sych ^{List B}	(Ukraine)	MF	1 April 2001 (age 25)
76	Ostap Prytula ^{List B}	(Ukraine)	MF	24 June 2000 (age 26)
85	Vasyl Runich ^{List B}	(Ukraine)	MF	31 January 2000 (age 26)
Forwards
13	Yaroslav Deda ^{List B}	(Ukraine)	FW	28 May 1999 (age 27)
17	Alexandru Boiciuc	(Moldova)	FW	21 August 1997 (age 29)
19	Hisham Layous ^{List B}	(Israel)	FW	13 November 2000 (age 25)
73	Rostyslav Lyakh ^{List B}	(Ukraine)	FW	12 October 2000 (age 26)

== Transfers ==
=== In ===
Date	Pos.	Player	Age	Moving from	Type	Fee	Source
Summer
25 June 2019	DF	(Croatia) Franjo Prce	23	(Cyprus) Omonia	Transfer	Undisclosed	
27 June 2019	DF	(Ukraine) Serhiy Vakulenko	25	(Ukraine) Shakhtar Donetsk	Transfer	Undisclosed	
3 July 2019	DF	(Luxembourg) Marvin da Graça	24	(Luxembourg) Progrès Niederkorn	Transfer	Undisclosed	
22 July 2019	MF	(Ukraine) Artem Kozak	21	(Ukraine) Arsenal Kyiv	Transfer	Free	
24 July 2019	GK	(Ukraine) Roman Pidkivka	24	(Ukraine) Arsenal Kyiv	Transfer	Free	
24 July 2019	FW	(Israel) Hisham Layous	18	(Israel) Bnei Sakhnin	Transfer	Undisclosed	
24 July 2019	MF	(Ukraine) Volodymyr Yakimets	21	(Ukraine) Shakhtar Donetsk	Transfer	Undisclosed	
30 July 2019	MF	(Croatia) Frane Vojković	22	(Croatia) Hajduk Split	Transfer	Undisclosed	
30 July 2019	FW	(Belarus) Kirill Kirilenko	18	(Belarus) BATE Borisov	Transfer	Undisclosed	
2 August 2019	DF	(Ukraine) Oleksandr Kucher	36	(Turkey) Kayserispor	Transfer	Undisclosed	
13 August 2019	DF	(Luxembourg) Tim Hall	22	(Luxembourg) Progrès Niederkorn	Transfer	Undisclosed	
29 August 2019	FW	(Moldova) Alexandru Boiciuc	22	(Denmark) Vejle	Transfer	Undisclosed	
23 September 2019	FW	(Germany) Melvyn Lorenzen	24	(Netherlands) Den Haag	Transfer	Free	
21 June 2019	GK	(Ukraine) Oleh Kudryk	22	(Ukraine) Shakhtar Donetsk	Loan		
2 July 2019	DF	(Ukraine) Vladyslav Dubinchak	21	(Ukraine) Dynamo Kyiv	Loan		
10 July 2019	MF	(Finland) Abukar Mohamed	20	(Italy) Lazio	Loan		
5 August 2019	FW	(Brazil) João Diogo	20	(Brazil) Figueirense	Loan		
2 September 2019	MF	(Ukraine) Yehor Nazaryna	22	(Belgium) Royal Antwerp	Loan		
1 June 2019	DF	(Ukraine) Oleh Veremiyenko	20	(Ukraine) FC Kalush	Loan return		
1 June 2019	MF	(Ukraine) Maksym Hrysyo	23	(Ukraine) Rukh Vynnyky	Loan return		
1 June 2019	MF	(Ukraine) Nazar Verbnyi	21	(Ukraine) Rukh Vynnyky	Loan return		
1 June 2019	FW	(Ukraine) Ihor Karpenko	21	(Ukraine) Volyn Lutsk	Loan return		
Winter
27 January 2020	DF	(Georgia (country)) Andro Giorgadze	23	(Czech Republic) Fastav Zlín	Transfer		
27 January 2020	MF	(Ukraine) Oleksiy Khakhlov	20	(Spain) Deportivo Alavés B	Transfer	Free	
10 February 2020	GK	(Ukraine) Anton Kanibolotskiy	31	Unattached	Transfer	Free	
18 February 2020	MF	(Ukraine) Hennadiy Pasich	26	(Ukraine) Olimpik Donetsk	Transfer	Free	
18 February 2020	MF	(Ukraine) Volodymyr Tanchyk	28	(Ukraine) Chornomorets Odesa	Transfer	Free	
27 February 2020	DF	(Ukraine) Vasyl Pryima	28	(Belarus) Shakhtyor Soligorsk	Transfer	Free	
11 March 2020	GK	(Ukraine) Volodymyr Makhankov	22	(Ukraine) Dynamo Kyiv	Transfer	Free	
10 February 2020	FW	(Senegal) Matar Dieye	22	(Ukraine) Olimpik Donetsk	Loan		
31 December 2019	MF	(Colombia) Jorge Carrascal	21	(Argentina) River Plate	Loan return		

=== Out ===
Date	Pos.	Player	Age	Moving to	Type	Fee	Source
Summer
31 May 2019	DF	(Senegal) Papa Gueye	35	(Ukraine) SC Dnipro-1	Transfer	Free	
31 May 2019	DF	(Ukraine) Nazar Stasyshyn	21	(Ukraine) Ahrobiznes Volochysk	Transfer	Free	
31 May 2019	MF	(France) Karim Yoda	30	(Spain) Racing Santander	Transfer	Free	
31 May 2019	MF	(Ukraine) Serhiy Myakushko	26	(Spain) Alcorcón	Transfer	Free	
19 June 2019	FW	(Ukraine) Roman Debelko	25	(Latvia) Riga	Transfer	Free	
20 June 2019	DF	(Ukraine) Denys Miroshnichenko	24	(Ukraine) FC Oleksandriya	Transfer	Free	
4 July 2019	DF	(Ukraine) Artem Fedetskyi	34	Unattached	Transfer	Free	
5 July 2019	DF	(Bosnia and Herzegovina) Adi Mehremić	27	(Portugal) Aves	Transfer	Free	
5 July 2019	DF	(Ukraine) Andriy Nesterov	29	(Hungary) Mezőkövesd	Transfer	Free	
22 July 2019	GK	(Ukraine) Herman Penkov	25	(Ukraine) Olimpik Donetsk	Transfer	Free	
31 August 2019	GK	(Ukraine) Maksym Kuchynskyi	31	(Georgia (country)) Dinamo Batumi	Transfer	Free	
9 August 2019	DF	(Georgia (country)) Nika Sandokhadze	25	(Georgia (country)) Saburtalo Tbilisi	Transfer	Free	
23 August 2019	DF	(Croatia) Franjo Prce	23	Unattached	Transfer	Free	
29 August 2019	FW	(Uruguay) Kevin Méndez	23	Unattached	Transfer	Free	
23 August 2019	FW	(Ukraine) Ihor Karpenko	21	(Ukraine) Volyn Lutsk	Loan		
23 August 2019	FW	(Ukraine) Andriy Remenyuk	20	(Ukraine) FC Kalush	Loan		
31 May 2019	FW	(Brazil) William de Camargo	20	(Spain) CD Leganés B	Loan return		
3 July 2019	MF	(Cameroon) Martin Hongla	21	(Spain) Granada	Loan return		
Winter
4 December 2019	FW	(Germany) Melvyn Lorenzen	25	Unattached	Transfer	Free	
19 December 2019	MF	(Croatia) Frane Vojković	22	(Croatia) Lokomotiva Zagreb	Transfer	Free	
1 January 2020	MF	(Colombia) Jorge Carrascal	21	(Argentina) River Plate	Transfer	€2,5 Million	
17 January 2020	FW	(Portugal) Cristian Ponde	24	Unattached	Transfer	Free	
17 January 2020	MF	(Argentina) Francisco Di Franco	24	(Ukraine) SC Dnipro-1	Transfer	Undisclosed	
21 January 2020	DF	(Ukraine) Oleksandr Kucher	37	Unattached	Transfer	Free	
21 January 2020	DF	(Ukraine) Serhiy Vakulenko	26	Ararat-Armenia	Transfer	Free	
21 January 2020	DF	(Ukraine) Oleksiy Kovtun	24	Unattached	Transfer	Free	
21 January 2020	MF	(Ukraine) Nazar Verbnyi	22	(Ukraine) Olimpik Donetsk	Transfer	Free	
21 January 2020	FW	(Ukraine) Oleksiy Hutsulyak	22	(Ukraine) Desna Chernihiv	Transfer	Undisclosed	
22 January 2020	GK	(Ukraine) Roman Pidkivka	24	Unattached	Transfer	Free	
24 January 2020	MF	(Ukraine) Maksym Hrysyo	23	Unattached	Transfer	Free	
28 January 2020	DF	(Ukraine) Andriy Busko	22	(Ukraine) FC Lviv	Transfer	Undisclosed	
19 May 2020	DF	(Luxembourg) Marvin da Graça	25	Unattached	Transfer	Free	
21 May 2020	GK	(Ukraine) Anton Kanibolotskiy	32	Unattached	Transfer	Free	
25 May 2020	DF	(Luxembourg) Tim Hall	23	(Portugal) Gil Vicente	Transfer	Free	
1 June 2020	FW	(Belarus) Kirill Kirilenko	19	(Ukraine) Olimpik Donetsk	Transfer	Free	
30 June 2020	DF	(Ukraine) Vasyl Pryima	29	Unattached	Transfer	Free	
10 July 2020	MF	(Ukraine) Artem Kozak	22	Unattached	Transfer	Free	
17 February 2020	GK	(Ukraine) Andriy Artym	19	(Ukraine) Ahrobiznes Volochysk	Loan		
4 March 2020	MF	(Ukraine) Roman Tolochko	21	(Ukraine) FC Kalush	Loan		
17 February 2020	FW	(Brazil) João Diogo	21	(Brazil) Figueirense	Loan return		
24 June 2020	MF	(Ukraine) Yehor Nazaryna	22	(Belgium) Royal Antwerp	Loan return		
24 June 2020	FW	(Senegal) Matar Dieye	22	(Ukraine) Olimpik Donetsk	Loan return		
30 June 2020	MF	(Finland) Abukar Mohamed	21	(Italy) Lazio	Loan return		
30 June 2020	DF	(Ukraine) Vladyslav Dubinchak	21	(Ukraine) Dynamo Kyiv	Loan return		

== Pre-season and friendlies ==
27 June 2019 Friendly	Karpaty Lviv	2 – 0	Veres Rivne	Lviv
18:00 EEST (UTC+03:00)	Layous 55'; Mehremić 76'	Report		Stadium: Ukraina Stadium

29 June 2019 Friendly	Karpaty Lviv	2 – 2	FC Mynai	Lviv
18:00 EEST (UTC+03:00)	Karpenko 26'; Layous 29'	Report	Pynyashko 61' ? 69'	Stadium: Ukraina Stadium

2 July 2019 Friendly	Karpaty Lviv	3 – 0	Prykarpattia Ivano-Frankivsk	Lviv
18:15 EEST (UTC+03:00)	Martins 17'; Vakulenko 24' (pen.); Karpenko 67'	Report		Stadium: Ukraina Stadium

5 July 2019 Friendly	Karpaty Lviv	2 – 0	Ahrobiznes Volochysk	Lviv
18:00 EEST (UTC+03:00)	Karpenko 54'; Martins 83'	Report		Stadium: Ukraina Stadium

10 July 2019 Friendly	Karpaty Lviv	1 – 0	FC Kalush	Lviv
17:30 EEST (UTC+03:00)	Layous 59'	Report		Stadium: Ukraina Stadium

13 July 2019 Friendly	Volyn Lutsk	0 – 0	Karpaty Lviv	Kamyanytsya
18:00 EEST (UTC+03:00)		Report		Stadium: Pitch of Kamelot Hotel

16 July 2019 Friendly	Kolos Kovalivka	1 – 0	Karpaty Lviv	Kyiv
18:00 EEST (UTC+03:00)	Zadoya 34'	Report		Stadium: Dynamo Training Center; Attendance: 50; Referee: Dmytro Kutakov

19 July 2019 Friendly	Karpaty Lviv	1 – 2	Veres Rivne	Lviv
18:00 EEST (UTC+03:00)	Karpenko 55'	Report	Shestakov 67'; Khovbosha 90'	Stadium: Ukraina Stadium

24 July 2019 Friendly	Karpaty Lviv	2 – 1	(Georgia (country)) Shevardeni-1906 Tbilisi	Lviv
17:00 EEST (UTC+03:00)	Vojković 39', 43'	Report	Babunadze 82' (pen.)	Stadium: Ukraina Stadium

7 September 2019 Friendly	CFR Cluj (Romania)	0 – 1	Karpaty Lviv	Cluj-Napoca, Romania
17:00 EEST (UTC+03:00)		Report	João Diogo	Stadium: Dr. Constantin Rădulescu

12 October 2019 Friendly	Karpaty Lviv	1 – 1	(Lithuania) Kauno Žalgiris	Lviv
17:00 EEST (UTC+03:00)	João Diogo 23'		Krušnauskas 44'	Stadium: Ukraina Stadium; Referee: Yuriy Mozharovskyi

29 January 2020 Friendly	Slovan Bratislava (Slovakia)	1 – 1	Karpaty Lviv	Belek, Turkey
15:00 TRT (UTC+03:00)	Moha 3'	Report	Nazaryna 89' (pen.)	Stadium: Calista Sports Center

1 February 2020 Friendly	Sereď (Slovakia)	0 – 3	Karpaty Lviv	Belek, Turkey
15:00 TRT (UTC+03:00)		Report	Lyakh 5', 41'; João Diogo 76'	Stadium: S&B Sport Football Complex

5 February 2020 Friendly	Tuzla City (Bosnia and Herzegovina)	1 – 0	Karpaty Lviv	Side, Turkey
14:30 TRT (UTC+03:00)	Arežina 27'	Report		Stadium: Side Star Sports Complex

8 February 2020 Friendly	Metallurg Bekabad (Uzbekistan)	1 – 2	Karpaty Lviv	Belek, Turkey
17:00 TRT (UTC+03:00)	Abdulkhakov 11'	Report	Klyots 44'; Kozak 70'	Stadium: IC Hotels Football Center

11 February 2020 Friendly	Køge (Denmark)	3 – 3	Karpaty Lviv	Side, Turkey
17:20 TRT (UTC+03:00)	Helsted 6'; Elvius 46'; Johansson 67' (pen.)	Report	Lyakh 30'; Tanchyk 55'; Tlumak 83'	Stadium: Arslan Zeki Demirci Sports Complex; Referee: Kostiantyn Trukhanov

14 February 2020 Friendly	Dynamo Brest (Belarus)	2 – 2	Karpaty Lviv	Belek, Turkey
17:00 TRT (UTC+03:00)	Bakaj 78'; Savitski 82'	Report	Tanchyk 33'; Dieye 45+1'	Stadium: Calista Sports Center

23 May 2020 Friendly	Karpaty Lviv	1 – 0	Volyn Lutsk
	Tlumak (pen.)	Report

== Competitions ==
=== Overall ===
Competition	Record							
Competition	Pld	W	D	L	GF	GA	GD	Win %
Premier League	24	2	9	13	19	42	−23	8.33
Cup	1	0	1	0	0	0	+0	0.00
Total	25	2	10	13	19	42	−23	8.00

Last updated: 27 June 2020
Source: Competitions

=== Premier League ===
==== League table ====
Pos	Team	Pld	W	D	L	GF	GA	GD	Pts	Qualification or relegation (Note: Teams play each other twice (22 matches), before the league split into two groups (the top six and the bottom six) for the last 10 matches.)
8	FC Mariupol	22	6	7	9	21	35	−14	25 (Note: Dnipro-1 is ahead of Mariupol on head-to-head goal difference: Dnipro-1 3, Mariupol 1)	Qualification for the Relegation round
9	FC Lviv	22	5	5	12	16	35	−19	20 (Note: Lviv is ahead of Vorskla on head-to-head goal difference: Lviv 4, Vorskla 3)	Qualification for the Relegation round
10	Vorskla Poltava	22	6	2	14	15	38	−23	20	Qualification for the Relegation round
11	Olimpik Donetsk	22	5	3	14	17	37	−20	18	Qualification for the Relegation round
12	Karpaty Lviv	22	2	7	13	17	40	−23	13	Qualification for the Relegation round

Source: Ukrainian Premier League, Soccerway
Rules for classification: 1) Points; 2) Head-to-head points; 3) Head-to-head goal difference; 4) Head-to-head higher number of goals scored; 5) Goal difference; 6) Higher number of goals scored; 7) Draw or "golden match" if tied for title (Article 22, paragraph 3).

==== Relegation round ====
Pos	Team	Pld	W	D	L	GF	GA	GD	Pts	Qualification or relegation
8	FC Mariupol	32	12	9	11	40	46	−6	45	Qualification for the playoff for Europa League second qualifying round
9	Olimpik Donetsk	32	10	6	16	32	47	−15	36	
10	Vorskla Poltava	32	9	7	16	23	48	−25	34	
11	FC Lviv	32	5	9	18	25	57	−32	24	
12	Karpaty Lviv (Note: Karpaty Lviv was expelled from the league for failing to appear to two games.)	32	2	9	21	19	48	−29	15	Expelled from the league

Source: Ukrainian Premier League, UEFA, Soccerway
Rules for classification: 1) Points; 2) Head-to-head points; 3) Head-to-head goal difference; 4) Head-to-head higher number of goals scored; 5) Goal difference; 6) Higher number of goals scored; 7) Draw or "golden match" if tied for title (Article 22, paragraph 3).

==== Results summary ====
Overall								Home						Away					
Pld	W	D	L	GF	GA	GD	Pts	W	D	L	GF	GA	GD	W	D	L	GF	GA	GD
24	2	9	13	19	42	−23	15	1	4	7	9	24	−15	1	5	6	10	18	−8

Last updated: 27 June 2020.
Source: Competitive matches

==== Results by round ====
Round	1	2	3	4	5	6	7	8	9	10	11	12	13	14	15	16	17	18	19	20	21	22	23	24	25	26	27	28	29	30	31	32
Ground	H	A	H	A	H	A	H	A	H	A	H	A	H	A	H	A	H	A	H	A	H	A	A	H	A	H	H	H	A	H	A	A
Result	L	L	D	W	L	D	W	L	L	L	D	D	L	D	L	L	L	L	D	L	L	D	D	L	L	L	L	D	L	L	L	L
Position	11	12	11	9	11	11	8	9	9	9	9	10	10	10	10	11	11	12	12	12	12	12	12	12	12	12	12	12	12	12	12	12

Updated to match(es) played on 24 July 2020. Source: Competitive matches
A = Away; H = Home; W = Win; D = Draw; L = Loss

==== Matches ====
31 July 2019 1	Karpaty Lviv	0 – 2	Dynamo Kyiv	Lviv
19:30 EEST (UTC+03:00)	Karpenko (yellow card) 16'; Hutsulyak (yellow card) 45+1'; Verbnyi (yellow card) 83'	Report	Kádár (yellow card) 13'; Besyedin (yellow card) 27', (goal) 45+2' (pen.); Kovtun 42' (o.g.); Kędziora (yellow card) 67'; Mykolenko (yellow card) 79'	Stadium: Ukraina Stadium; Attendance: 12,135; Referee: Viktor Kopiievskyi

4 August 2019 2	Shakhtar Donetsk	3 – 0	Karpaty Lviv	Kharkiv
19:30 EEST (UTC+03:00)	Marlos 40'; Moraes 45'; Ismaily 63'; Patrick (yellow card) 66'	Report	Di Franco (yellow card) 38'; Kovtun (yellow card) 49'; Vojković (yellow card) 90+2'	Stadium: Metalist Stadium; Attendance: 6,656; Referee: Mykola Balakin

11 August 2019 3	Karpaty Lviv	1 – 1	FC Mariupol	Lviv
19:30 EEST (UTC+03:00)	Vojković 30'; Klyots (yellow card) 46' (yellow-red card) 67'; Hutsulyak (yellow card) 66'; Di Franco (yellow card) 77'	Report	Topalov 25'; Yavorskyi (yellow card) 56'; Fedorchuk (yellow card) 79'	Stadium: Ukraina Stadium; Attendance: 3,197; Referee: Kostiantyn Trukhanov

18 August 2019 4	Olimpik Donetsk	1 – 3	Karpaty Lviv	Kyiv
17:00 EEST (UTC+03:00)	Dieye (yellow card) 4'; Fabinho (yellow card) 10', (red card) 24'; H.Pasich (yellow card) 32'; Politylo 62' (pen.)	Report	Hutsulyak 26', 65'; Vakulenko (yellow card) 35'; Di Franco 42'; Dubinchak (yellow card) 61'	Stadium: Valeriy Lobanovskyi Dynamo Stadium; Attendance: 800; Referee: Denys Shurman

25 August 2019 5	Karpaty Lviv	0 – 1	Zorya Luhansk	Lviv
17:00 EEST (UTC+03:00)	Ponde (yellow card) 67'; Di Franco (yellow card) 67'	Report	Kamenyuka (yellow card) 52'; Budkivskyi 58', (yellow card) 89'; Ivanisenya (yellow card) 67'; Khomchenovskyi (yellow card) 79'; Bilyi (yellow card) 85'	Stadium: Ukraina Stadium; Attendance: 3,561; Referee: Oleksandr Derdo

30 August 2019 6	Desna Chernihiv	0 – 0	Karpaty Lviv	Chernihiv
19:00 EEST (UTC+03:00)	Bohdanov (yellow card) 14'; D.Favorov (yellow card) 54'; Hitchenko (yellow card) 59'	Report	Kovtun (yellow card) 37'; Dubinchak (yellow card) 38'; Martins (yellow card) 56'; Kozak (yellow card) 90+5'	Stadium: Chernihiv Stadium; Attendance: 4,463; Referee: Volodymyr Novokhatniy

14 September 2019 7	Karpaty Lviv	2 – 1	Vorskla Poltava	Lviv
17:00 EEST (UTC+03:00)	Di Franco (yellow card) 38'; Klyots (yellow card) 45+1'; Ponde 69' (pen.); Martins 80'	Report	Kolomoyets (yellow card) 18'; Bayenko 41'; Vasin (yellow card) 53'; Chesnakov (yellow card) 68'; Sapay (yellow card) 81'	Stadium: Ukraina Stadium; Attendance: 2,950; Referee: Ihor Paskhal

20 September 2019 8	SC Dnipro-1	2 – 0	Karpaty Lviv	Dnipro
19:00 EEST (UTC+03:00)	Supriaha 27', 71' (pen.); Kohut (yellow card) 60'; Polyovyi (yellow card) 63'; Kravchenko (yellow card) 79'	Report	Vakulenko (yellow card) 68'; Ponde (yellow card) 79'; Martins (yellow card) 79'	Stadium: Dnipro Arena; Attendance: 3,469; Referee: Denys Shurman

28 September 2019 9	Karpaty Lviv	1 – 2	Kolos Kovalivka	Lviv
17:00 EEST (UTC+03:00)	Klyots (yellow card) 2'; João Diogo (yellow card) 26'; Nazaryna 28'; Vakulenko (yellow card) 71'	Report	Orikhovskyi (yellow card) 4'; Kostyshyn (yellow card) 5'; Smyrnyi 8'; Volkov 44'; Paramonov (yellow card) 67'; Kyzylatesh (yellow card) 73'; Chornomorets (yellow card) 74'; Nekhtiy (yellow card) 83'	Stadium: Ukraina Stadium; Attendance: 1,651; Referee: Ivan Bondar

6 October 2019 10	FC Oleksandriya	2 – 1	Karpaty Lviv	Oleksandriia
19:30 EEST (UTC+03:00)	Stetskov (yellow card) 7'; Hrechyshkin 50'; Babohlo 82'; Bezborodko (yellow card) 83'; Miroshnichenko (yellow card) 90+2'	Report	Hall 58', (yellow card) 90+2'; Dubinchak (yellow card) 64'; Verbnyi (yellow card) 76'	Stadium: Nika Stadium; Attendance: 1,132; Referee: Yuriy Ivanov

19 October 2019 11	Karpaty Lviv	0 – 0	FC Lviv	Lviv
14:00 EEST (UTC+03:00)	Hall (yellow card) 36'; Verbnyi (red card) 44'; Di Franco (yellow card) 67'; João Diogo (yellow card) 74'	Report	Lyulka (yellow card) 28'; Alvaro (yellow card) 30'; Marthã (yellow card) 32'; Bratkov (yellow card) 59'; Renan (yellow card) 76'; Sabino (red card) 79'	Stadium: Ukraina Stadium; Attendance: 5,434; Referee: Yevhen Aranovskyi

27 October 2019 12	Dynamo Kyiv	1 – 1	Karpaty Lviv	Kyiv
17:00 EET (UTC+02:00)	Sydorchuk (yellow card) 39'; Verbič 49'; Popov (yellow card) 65'; Shaparenko (yellow card) 90+6'	Report	Di Franco (yellow card) 81'; Shabanov 85' (o.g.); Hall (yellow card) 90+3'	Stadium: Olympic Stadium; Attendance: 5,085; Referee: Dmytro Kryvushkin

2 November 2019 13	Karpaty Lviv	0 – 3	Shakhtar Donetsk	Lviv
14:00 EET (UTC+02:00)	Ponde (yellow card) 51'	Report	Boryachuk 10'; Kovalenko 58'; Tetê 65'	Stadium: Ukraina Stadium; Attendance: 5,123; Referee: Ihor Paskhal

9 November 2019 14	FC Mariupol	2 – 2	Karpaty Lviv	Mariupol
14:00 EET (UTC+02:00)	Churko 15', (yellow card) 41'; Dawa (yellow card) 52'; Myshnyov 54', (yellow card) 61'; Chekh (yellow card) 80'; Yavorskyi (yellow card) 90+3'	Report	Veremiyenko (yellow card) 14'; Nazaryna (yellow card) 29', (goal) 59', 90+4' (pen.); Di Franco (yellow card) 35'; Hall (yellow card) 45+3'; Vojković (yellow card) 79'	Stadium: Volodymyr Boiko Stadium; Attendance: 4,077; Referee: Yevhen Aranovskyi

24 November 2019 15	Karpaty Lviv	1 – 2	Olimpik Donetsk	Lviv
14:00 EET (UTC+02:00)	Nazaryna 9'; Dubinchak (yellow card) 71'	Report	Zotko (yellow card) 11'; Tsymbalyuk 26'; Shahab 45+2'; Snurnitsyn (yellow card) 60'; Lukyanchuk (yellow card) 89'; Do Couto (yellow card) 90+1'	Stadium: Ukraina Stadium; Attendance: 754; Referee: Andriy Kovalenko

30 November 2019 16	Zorya Luhansk	2 – 0	Karpaty Lviv	Zaporizhia
14:00 EET (UTC+02:00)	Vernydub 54'; Ivanisenya (yellow card) 58'; Lyednyev (yellow card) 63'; Abu Hanna (yellow card) 66'; Rusyn 87'	Report	Martins (yellow card) 56'; Deda (yellow card) 59'	Stadium: Slavutych-Arena; Attendance: 1,675; Referee: Yaroslav Kozyk

8 December 2019 17	Karpaty Lviv	2 – 6	Desna Chernihiv	Lviv
14:00 EET (UTC+02:00)	Martins (yellow card) 14'; Nazaryna 17' (pen.); Kudryk (red card) 57'; Boiciuc 64'; Dubinchak (yellow card) 74'; Veremiyenko (yellow card) 85'	Report	Imerekov 3'; Filippov 16' (pen.), 89'; A.Favorov (yellow card) 37'; Kalitvintsev 51', 80'; Khlyobas 77'	Stadium: Ukraina Stadium; Attendance: 923; Referee: Denys Shurman

15 December 2019 18	Vorskla Poltava	2 – 1	Karpaty Lviv	Poltava
14:00 EET (UTC+02:00)	Luizão (yellow card) 20', (goal) 30'; Vasin 42' (pen.); Perduta (yellow card) 51'; Sklyar (yellow card) 74'	Report	Boiciuc 39'; Abukar (yellow card) 50'; Hall (yellow card) 53'; Yakimets (yellow card) 65'; Kucher (yellow card) 69'; Nazaryna (yellow card) 71'	Stadium: Oleksiy Butovsky Vorskla Stadium; Attendance: 1,117; Referee: Oleksandr Derdo

23 February 2020 19	Karpaty Lviv	1 – 1	SC Dnipro-1	Lviv
14:00 EET (UTC+02:00)	Dubinchak (yellow card) 22' (yellow-red card) 89'; Dieye 24', (yellow card) 82'; Klyots (yellow card) 52'; Pasich (yellow card) 58'	Report	Supriaha 41'; Batahov (yellow card) 65'; Adamyuk (yellow card) 74'; Korkishko (yellow card) 90'	Stadium: Ukraina Stadium; Attendance: 2,135; Referee: Dmytro Kutakov

29 February 2020 20	Kolos Kovalivka	2 – 1	Karpaty Lviv	Kyiv
17:00 EET (UTC+02:00)	Ilyin 11'; Yemets (yellow card) 25'; Petrov 42'; Smyrnyi (yellow card) 84'	Report	Boiciuc (yellow card) 43'; Giorgadze (yellow card) 47'; Pasich (yellow card) 65'; Prytula (yellow card) 77'; Kozak 78'; Nazaryna (yellow card) 90+3'	Stadium: Obolon Arena; Attendance: 2,780; Referee: Maksym Kozyriatskyi

4 March 2020 21	Karpaty Lviv	0 – 4	FC Oleksandriya	Lviv
19:30 EET (UTC+02:00)	Kozak (yellow card) 13'; Hall (yellow card) 31'; Nazaryna (yellow card) 59'	Report	Tretyakov 37' (pen.), 58'; Miroshnichenko (yellow card) 50'; Sitalo 73'; Banada 89'; Dovhyi (yellow card) 90+1'	Stadium: Ukraina Stadium; Attendance: 1,116; Referee: Dmytro Kryvushkin

8 March 2020 22	FC Lviv	0 – 0	Karpaty Lviv	Lviv
14:00 EET (UTC+02:00)	Lyulka (yellow card) 50'; Jonatan (yellow card) 64' (yellow-red card) 90+2'	Report	Dubinchak (yellow card) 21'; Giorgadze (yellow card) 34'; Dieye (yellow card) 40'	Stadium: Ukraina Stadium; Attendance: 5,436; Referee: Viktor Kopiievskyi

==== Relegation round ====
14 March 2020 23	FC Lviv	1 – 1	Karpaty Lviv	Lviv
14:00 EET (UTC+02:00)	Iacovelli 50', (yellow card) 51'; Sabino (yellow card) 85'; Pryimak (yellow card) 89'	Report	Boiciuc (yellow card) 3'; Bratkov 27' (o.g.); Hall (yellow card) 30'; Klyots (yellow card) 49'; Pasich (yellow card) 83' (yellow-red card) 87'	Stadium: Ukraina Stadium; Attendance: 0^{[a]} Referee: Dmytro Kutakov

27 June 2020 28	Karpaty Lviv	1 – 1	FC Lviv	Lutsk
17:00 EEST (UTC+03:00)	Khakhlyov (yellow card) 16' (yellow-red card) 42'; Giorgadze (yellow card) 40'; Slyusar (yellow card) 58'; Deda 61'; Kudryk (yellow card) 90+4'	Report	Sabino 36'; China (yellow card) 70'; Bohunov (yellow card) 76'	Stadium: Avanhard Stadium; Attendance: 0^{[a]} Referee: Andriy Kovalenko

1 July 2020 24	Karpaty Lviv	0 – 3^{[b]}^{[d]}	FC Mariupol	Mariupol
19:00 EEST (UTC+03:00)				Stadium: Volodymyr Boiko Stadium; Referee: Dmytro Bondarenko

4 July 2020 29	FC Mariupol	3 – 0^{[d]}	Karpaty Lviv	Mariupol
17:00 EEST (UTC+03:00)				Stadium: Volodymyr Boiko Stadium; Referee: Maksym Kozyryatskyi

8 July 2020 26	Karpaty Lviv	^{[b]}^{[e]}	SC Dnipro-1	Dnipro
				Stadium: Dnipro Arena

12 July 2020 30	Karpaty Lviv	^{[e]}	Vorskla Poltava	Lviv
17:00 EEST (UTC+03:00)				Stadium: Ukraina Stadium

15 July 2020 31	SC Dnipro-1	^{[e]}	Karpaty Lviv	Dnipro
17:00 EEST (UTC+03:00)				Stadium: Dnipro Arena

19 July 2020 32	Olimpik Donetsk	^{[e]}	Karpaty Lviv	Kyiv
17:00 EEST (UTC+03:00)				Stadium: Valeriy Lobanovskyi Dynamo Stadium

July 2020 25	Vorskla Poltava	^{[b]}^{[e]}	Karpaty Lviv	Poltava
19:30 EEST (UTC+03:00)				Stadium: Oleksiy Butovsky Vorskla Stadium

July 2020 27	Karpaty Lviv	^{[c]}^{[e]}	Olimpik Donetsk	Lutsk
17:00 EEST (UTC+03:00)				Stadium: Avanhard Stadium; Referee: Volodymyr Novokhatniy

- ^{a} UPL directed for matches to be held behind closed doors after Government of Ukraine banned all public events of 200 or more people due to coronavirus pandemic.
- ^{b} Matches postponed because 25 Karpaty players and personnel tested positive for COVID-19.
- ^{c} Match postponed because 2 Olimpik players tested positive for COVID-19.
- ^{d} Karpaty didn't arrive due to financial difficulties. Victory awarded to FC Mariupol.
- ^{e} Karpaty were expelled from the league after failing to appear in two consecutive games. Victories in remaining matches awarded to their opponents.

=== Ukrainian Cup ===
25 September 2019 Round of 20 (1/16)	Inhulets Petrove	0 – 0 (7 – 6 p)	Karpaty Lviv	Petrove
17:00 EEST (UTC+03:00)	Marchuk (yellow card) 30'; Ihnatyev (yellow card) 41'; Ella (yellow card) 52' (yellow-red card) 111'; Kucherenko (yellow card) 77'	Report	Di Franco (yellow card) 17'; Dubinchak (yellow card) 20'; Martins (yellow card) 59'; Hall (yellow card) 60'; João Diogo (yellow card) 65'; Nazaryna (yellow card) 76'; Vakulenko (yellow card) 95'	Stadium: Inhulets Stadium; Attendance: 1,900; Referee: Mykola Balakin
	Penalties
	O.Kozak (penalty missed); Synyohub (penalty scored); Kucherenko (penalty scored); Akymenko (penalty scored); Zaporozhets (penalty scored); Klymenko (penalty scored); Pysko (penalty scored); Fatyeyev (penalty scored)		(penalty scored) Boiciuc; (penalty missed) A.Kozak; (penalty scored) Nazaryna; (penalty scored) João Diogo; (penalty scored) Vakulenko; (penalty scored) Kirilenko; (penalty scored) Hall; (penalty missed) Dubinchak

== Statistics ==
=== Appearances and goals ===
No.	Pos	Nat	Player	Total		Premier League		Cup	
No.	Pos	Nat	Player	Apps	Goals	Apps	Goals	Apps	Goals
Goalkeepers
31	GK	(Ukraine) UKR	Oleh Kudryk	12	0	11	0	1	0
Defenders
24	DF	(Ukraine) UKR	Vladyslav Dubinchak	20	0	19	0	1	0
30	DF	(Georgia (country)) GEO	Andro Giorgadze	6	0	6	0	0	0
44	DF	(Ukraine) UKR	Vasyl Pryima	2	0	0+2	0	0	0
49	DF	(Ukraine) UKR	Roman Slyva	1	0	1	0	0	0
64	DF	(Ukraine) UKR	Oleh Veremiyenko	6	0	6	0	0	0
82	DF	(Ukraine) UKR	Denys Slyusar	1	0	1	0	0	0
Midfielders
7	MF	(Ukraine) UKR	Dmytro Klyots	23	0	21+1	0	0+1	0
8	MF	(Ukraine) UKR	Oleksiy Khakhlyov	3	0	2+1	0	0	0
14	MF	(Ukraine) UKR	Artem Kozak	11	1	4+6	1	0+1	0
20	MF	(Ukraine) UKR	Volodymyr Tanchyk	2	0	2	0	0	0
21	MF	(Finland) FIN	Abukar Mohamed	1	0	0+1	0	0	0
22	MF	(Ukraine) UKR	Yuriy Tlumak	1	0	0+1	0	0	0
33	MF	(Ukraine) UKR	Volodymyr Yakimets	9	0	4+5	0	0	0
41	MF	(Ukraine) UKR	Hennadiy Pasich	4	0	4	0	0	0
70	MF	(Ukraine) UKR	Maksym Khlan	1	0	0+1	0	0	0
74	MF	(Ukraine) UKR	Oleksiy Sych	2	0	2	0	0	0
76	MF	(Ukraine) UKR	Ostap Prytula	6	0	5+1	0	0	0
85	MF	(Ukraine) UKR	Vasyl Runich	1	0	0+1	0	0	0
Forwards
13	FW	(Ukraine) UKR	Yaroslav Deda	8	1	2+6	1	0	0
17	FW	(Moldova) MDA	Alexandru Boiciuc	17	2	9+7	2	0+1	0
19	FW	(Israel) ISR	Hisham Layous	9	0	0+8	0	1	0
73	FW	(Ukraine) UKR	Rostyslav Lyakh	11	0	9+2	0	0	0
Players transferred out during the season
4	MF	(Croatia) CRO	Frane Vojković	13	1	3+9	1	1	0
5	DF	(Ukraine) UKR	Oleksandr Kucher	4	0	4	0	0	0
8	MF	(Ukraine) UKR	Nazar Verbnyi	8	0	8	0	0	0
9	FW	(Ukraine) UKR	Oleksiy Hutsulyak	12	2	9+3	2	0	0
10	FW	(Portugal) POR	Cristian Ponde	12	1	9+2	1	1	0
10	FW	(Senegal) SEN	Matar Dieye	3	1	3	1	0	0
20	MF	(Argentina) ARG	Francisco Di Franco	16	1	14+1	1	1	0
29	MF	(Ukraine) UKR	Yehor Nazaryna	16	5	15	5	1	0
30	FW	(Ukraine) UKR	Ihor Karpenko	3	0	2+1	0	0	0
32	GK	(Ukraine) UKR	Anton Kanibolotskiy	1	0	1	0	0	0
34	DF	(Luxembourg) LUX	Tim Hall	19	1	18	1	1	0
36	FW	(Germany) GER	Melvyn Lorenzen	4	0	2+2	0	0	0
50	DF	(Ukraine) UKR	Oleksiy Kovtun	6	0	6	0	0	0
52	GK	(Ukraine) UKR	Andriy Artym	3	0	2+1	0	0	0
66	DF	(Luxembourg) LUX	Marvin da Graça	23	1	22	1	1	0
68	MF	(Ukraine) UKR	Roman Tolochko	1	0	1	0	0	0
77	GK	(Ukraine) UKR	Roman Pidkivka	10	0	10	0	0	0
79	DF	(Ukraine) UKR	Serhiy Vakulenko	17	0	16	0	1	0
81	FW	(Ukraine) UKR	Andriy Remenyuk	1	0	0+1	0	0	0
95	FW	(Belarus) BLR	Kirill Kirilenko	5	0	2+2	0	0+1	0
99	FW	(Brazil) BRA	João Diogo	13	0	9+3	0	1	0

Source: Competitions

Last updated: 27 June 2020

=== Goalscorers ===
Rank	No.	Pos	Nat	Name	Premier League	Cup	Total
1	29	MF	(Ukraine)	Yehor Nazaryna	5	0	5
2	9	FW	(Ukraine)	Oleksiy Hutsulyak	2	0	2
	17	FW	(Moldova)	Alexandru Boiciuc	2	0	2
				Own goal	2	0	2
5	4	MF	(Croatia)	Frane Vojković	1	0	1
	20	MF	(Argentina)	Francisco Di Franco	1	0	1
	10	FW	(Portugal)	Cristian Ponde	1	0	1
	66	DF	(Luxembourg)	Marvin da Graça	1	0	1
	34	DF	(Luxembourg)	Tim Hall	1	0	1
	10	FW	(Senegal)	Matar Dieye	1	0	1
	14	MF	(Ukraine)	Artem Kozak	1	0	1
	13	FW	(Ukraine)	Yaroslav Deda	1	0	1
				Total	19	0	19

Last updated: 27 June 2020

=== Clean sheets ===
Rank	No.	Pos	Nat	Name	Premier League	Cup	Total
1	31	GK	(Ukraine)	Oleh Kudryk	2	1	3
2	77	GK	(Ukraine)	Roman Pidkivka	1	0	1
				Total	3	1	4

Last updated: 8 March 2020

=== Disciplinary record ===
No.	Pos	Nat	Player	Premier League			Cup			Total		
No.	Pos	Nat	Player	Yellow card	(yellow card) (yellow-red card)	Red card	Yellow card	(yellow card) (yellow-red card)	Red card	Yellow card	(yellow card) (yellow-red card)	Red card
4	MF	(Croatia)	Frane Vojković	2	0	0	0	0	0	2	0	0
5	DF	(Ukraine)	Oleksandr Kucher	1	0	0	0	0	0	1	0	0
7	MF	(Ukraine)	Dmytro Klyots	4	1	0	0	0	0	4	1	0
8	MF	(Ukraine)	Nazar Verbnyi	2	0	1	0	0	0	2	0	1
8	MF	(Ukraine)	Oleksiy Khakhlyov	0	1	0	0	0	0	0	1	0
9	FW	(Ukraine)	Oleksiy Hutsulyak	2	0	0	0	0	0	2	0	0
10	FW	(Portugal)	Cristian Ponde	3	0	0	0	0	0	3	0	0
10	FW	(Senegal)	Matar Dieye	2	0	0	0	0	0	2	0	0
13	FW	(Ukraine)	Yaroslav Deda	1	0	0	0	0	0	1	0	0
14	MF	(Ukraine)	Artem Kozak	2	0	0	0	0	0	2	0	0
17	FW	(Moldova)	Alexandru Boiciuc	2	0	0	0	0	0	2	0	0
20	MF	(Argentina)	Francisco Di Franco	7	0	0	1	0	0	8	0	0
21	MF	(Finland)	Abukar Mohamed	1	0	0	0	0	0	1	0	0
24	DF	(Ukraine)	Vladyslav Dubinchak	6	1	0	1	0	0	7	1	0
29	MF	(Ukraine)	Yehor Nazaryna	4	0	0	1	0	0	5	0	0
30	FW	(Ukraine)	Ihor Karpenko	1	0	0	0	0	0	1	0	0
30	DF	(Georgia (country))	Andro Giorgadze	3	0	0	0	0	0	3	0	0
31	GK	(Ukraine)	Oleh Kudryk	1	0	1	0	0	0	1	0	1
33	MF	(Ukraine)	Volodymyr Yakimets	1	0	0	0	0	0	1	0	0
34	DF	(Luxembourg)	Tim Hall	7	0	0	1	0	0	8	0	0
41	MF	(Ukraine)	Hennadiy Pasich	2	1	0	0	0	0	2	1	0
50	DF	(Ukraine)	Oleksiy Kovtun	2	0	0	0	0	0	2	0	0
64	DF	(Ukraine)	Oleh Veremiyenko	2	0	0	0	0	0	2	0	0
66	DF	(Luxembourg)	Marvin da Graça	4	0	0	1	0	0	5	0	0
76	MF	(Ukraine)	Ostap Prytula	1	0	0	0	0	0	1	0	0
79	DF	(Ukraine)	Serhiy Vakulenko	3	0	0	1	0	0	4	0	0
82	DF	(Ukraine)	Denys Slyusar	1	0	0	0	0	0	1	0	0
99	FW	(Brazil)	João Diogo	2	0	0	1	0	0	3	0	0
			Total	69	4	2	7	0	0	76	4	2

Last updated: 27 June 2020
