= 2018 UEFA European Under-19 Championship squads =

Player listings in youth football competition

The 2018 UEFA European Under-19 Championship was an international football tournament held in Finland from 16 to 29 July 2017.

Each national team submitted a squad of 20 players, two of whom had to be goalkeepers.

Players in boldface have been capped at full international level since the tournament.

Ages are as of the start of the tournament, 16 July 2017.

== Group A ==
=== Finland ===
Finland named their squad on 13 July 2018.

Head coach: Juha Malinen

No.	Pos.	Player	Date of birth (age)	Club
1	GK	Rasmus Leislahti	16 June 2000 (aged 18)	(Football Association of Finland) HJK
12	GK	Robin Källman	12 February 1999 (aged 19)	(Football Association of Finland) HJK
2	DF	Ville Tikkanen	8 August 1999 (aged 18)	(Football Association of Finland) SJK
3	DF	Martti Haukioja	6 October 1999 (aged 18)	(Football Association of Finland) Ilves
4	DF	Valtteri Vesiaho	10 February 1999 (aged 19)	(Football Association of Finland) HJK
5	DF	Kalle Katz	4 January 2000 (aged 18)	(Football Association of Finland) HJK
14	DF	Kristian Heinolainen	11 May 1999 (aged 19)	(Football Association of Finland) PS Kemi
6	MF	Abukar Mohamed	1 January 1999 (aged 19)	(Italian Football Federation) Lazio
8	MF	**Saku Ylätupa**	4 August 1999 (aged 18)	(Royal Dutch Football Association) Ajax
15	MF	**Jaakko Oksanen**	7 November 2000 (aged 17)	(The Football Association) Brentford B
16	MF	Teemu Jäntti	2 March 2000 (aged 18)	(Football Association of Finland) Lahti
17	MF	**Anssi Suhonen**	14 January 2001 (aged 17)	(German Football Association) Hamburger SV
18	MF	Alex Bradley	27 January 1999 (aged 19)	(The Football Association) West Bromwich Albion Youth
19	MF	Joel Mattsson	17 March 1999 (aged 19)	(Football Association of Finland) IFK
20	MF	Miko Virtanen	26 January 1999 (aged 19)	(Scottish Football Association) Aberdeen Youth
7	FW	Timo Stavitski	17 July 1999 (aged 18)	(French Football Federation) Caen
9	FW	Eetu Vertainen	11 May 1999 (aged 19)	(Football Association of Finland) HJK
10	FW	Albion Ademi	19 February 1999 (aged 19)	(Football Association of Finland) Inter Turku
11	FW	Tobias Fagerström	12 July 2000 (aged 18)	(German Football Association) Hamburger SV
13	FW	Niklas Jokelainen	30 March 2000 (aged 18)	(Football Association of Finland) Ilves

=== Portugal ===
Portugal named their squad on 11 July 2018.

Head coach: Hélio Sousa

No.	Pos.	Player	Date of birth (age)	Club
1	GK	**Diogo Costa**	19 September 1999 (aged 18)	(Portuguese Football Federation) Porto
12	GK	João Virgínia	10 October 1999 (aged 18)	(The Football Association) Arsenal
2	DF	**David Carmo**	19 July 1999 (aged 18)	(Portuguese Football Federation) Braga
3	DF	Diogo Queirós	5 January 1999 (aged 19)	(Portuguese Football Federation) Porto
4	DF	Romain Correia	6 September 1999 (aged 18)	(Portuguese Football Federation) Vitória de Guimarães
5	DF	Rúben Vinagre	9 April 1999 (aged 19)	(The Football Association) Wolverhampton Wanderers
6	DF	Florentino Luís	19 August 1999 (aged 18)	(Portuguese Football Federation) Benfica
13	DF	Nuno Pina	31 March 1999 (aged 19)	(Swiss Football Association) Sion
14	DF	Thierry Correia	9 March 1999 (aged 19)	(Portuguese Football Federation) Sporting CP
8	MF	Miguel Luís	27 February 1999 (aged 19)	(Portuguese Football Federation) Sporting CP
10	MF	Domingos Quina	18 November 1999 (aged 18)	(The Football Association) West Ham United
15	MF	Francisco Moura	16 August 1999 (aged 18)	(Portuguese Football Federation) Braga
16	MF	Diogo Teixeira	20 January 1999 (aged 19)	(Portuguese Football Federation) Rio Ave
19	MF	**Elves Baldé**	2 October 1999 (aged 18)	(Portuguese Football Federation) Sporting CP
20	MF	Nuno Santos	2 March 1999 (aged 19)	(Portuguese Football Federation) Benfica
7	FW	João Filipe	30 March 1999 (aged 19)	(Portuguese Football Federation) Benfica
9	FW	José Gomes	8 April 1999 (aged 19)	(Portuguese Football Federation) Benfica
11	FW	Mesaque Djú	18 March 1999 (aged 19)	(Portuguese Football Federation) Benfica
17	FW	**Francisco Trincão**	29 December 1999 (aged 18)	(Portuguese Football Federation) Braga
18	FW	Pedro Correia	12 October 1999 (aged 18)	(Royal Spanish Football Federation) Deportivo La Coruña

=== Norway ===
Norway named their squad on 4 July 2018.

Head coach: Pål Arne Johansen

No.	Pos.	Player	Date of birth (age)	Club
1	GK	Emil Ødegaard	29 April 1999 (aged 19)	(Norwegian Football Federation) Grorud
12	GK	Julian Faye Lund	20 May 1999 (aged 19)	(Norwegian Football Federation) Levanger
2	DF	Christian Borchgrevink	11 May 1999 (aged 19)	(Norwegian Football Federation) Vålerenga
3	DF	John Kitolano	18 October 1999 (aged 18)	(Norwegian Football Federation) Odd
4	DF	Tord Salte	8 February 1999 (aged 19)	(Norwegian Football Federation) Viking
5	DF	**Leo Østigård**	28 November 1999 (aged 18)	(Norwegian Football Federation) Viking
14	DF	Ulrik Fredriksen	17 June 1999 (aged 19)	(Norwegian Football Federation) Sogndal
22	DF	**Nicholas Mickelson**	24 July 1999 (aged 18)	(Norwegian Football Federation) HamKam
6	MF	Felix Myhre	4 March 1999 (aged 19)	(Norwegian Football Federation) Vålerenga
7	MF	Hugo Vetlesen	29 February 2000 (aged 18)	(Norwegian Football Federation) Stabæk
8	MF	Tobias Christensen	11 May 2000 (aged 18)	(Norwegian Football Federation) Start
16	MF	Tobias Børkeeiet	18 April 1999 (aged 19)	(Norwegian Football Federation) Stabæk
17	MF	Martin Vinjor	29 September 1999 (aged 18)	(Norwegian Football Federation) Kongsvinger
18	MF	Tobias Svendsen	31 August 1999 (aged 18)	(Norwegian Football Federation) Molde
20	MF	Simen Bolkan Nordli	25 December 1999 (aged 18)	(Norwegian Football Federation) HamKam
21	MF	**Ola Brynhildsen**	27 April 1999 (aged 19)	(Norwegian Football Federation) Stabæk
9	FW	**Erik Botheim**	10 January 2000 (aged 18)	(Norwegian Football Federation) Rosenborg
10	FW	Eman Markovic	8 May 1999 (aged 19)	(Football Association of Bosnia and Herzegovina) Zrinjski Mostar
11	FW	**Jens Petter Hauge**	12 October 1999 (aged 18)	(Norwegian Football Federation) Bodø/Glimt
19	FW	**Erling Haaland**	21 July 2000 (aged 17)	(Norwegian Football Federation) Molde

=== Italy ===
Italy named their squad on 11 July 2018.

Head coach: Paolo Nicolato

No.	Pos.	Player	Date of birth (age)	Club
1	GK	Alessandro Plizzari	12 March 2000 (aged 18)	(Italian Football Federation) Milan
12	GK	Michele Cerofolini	4 January 1999 (aged 19)	(Italian Football Federation) Fiorentina Youth
2	DF	Antonio Candela	27 April 2000 (aged 18)	(Italian Football Federation) Genoa
3	DF	Alessandro Tripaldelli	9 February 1999 (aged 19)	(Italian Football Federation) Sassuolo Youth
4	DF	Gianmaria Zanandrea	26 May 1999 (aged 19)	(Italian Football Federation) Juventus Youth
6	DF	Davide Bettella	7 April 2000 (aged 18)	(Italian Football Federation) Atalanta
14	DF	**Raoul Bellanova**	17 May 2000 (aged 18)	(Italian Football Federation) Milan Youth
17	DF	Enrico Del Prato	10 November 1999 (aged 18)	(Italian Football Federation) Atalanta Youth
5	MF	**Nicolò Zaniolo**	2 July 1999 (aged 19)	(Italian Football Federation) Roma
7	MF	**Davide Frattesi**	22 September 1999 (aged 18)	(Italian Football Federation) Sassuolo
8	MF	Filippo Melegoni (captain)	18 February 1999 (aged 19)	(Italian Football Federation) Atalanta
10	MF	Christian Capone	28 April 1999 (aged 19)	(Italian Football Federation) Atalanta
16	MF	Andrea Marcucci	7 February 1999 (aged 19)	(Italian Football Federation) Roma Youth
18	MF	**Sandro Tonali**	8 May 2000 (aged 18)	(Italian Football Federation) Brescia
19	MF	Matteo Gabbia	21 October 1999 (aged 18)	(Italian Football Federation) Milan
21	MF	Alessandro Mallamo	22 March 1999 (aged 19)	(Italian Football Federation) Atalanta Youth
9	FW	**Andrea Pinamonti**	19 May 1999 (aged 19)	(Italian Football Federation) Internazionale
11	FW	**Gianluca Scamacca**	1 January 1999 (aged 19)	(Italian Football Federation) Sassuolo
15	FW	Enrico Brignola	8 July 1999 (aged 19)	(Italian Football Federation) Benevento
20	FW	**Moise Kean**	28 February 2000 (aged 18)	(Italian Football Federation) Juventus

== Group B ==
=== Turkey ===
Turkey named their squad on 16 June 2018.

Head coach: Vedat İnceefe

No.	Pos.	Player	Date of birth (age)	Club
1	GK	Ataberk Dadakdeniz	5 August 1999 (aged 18)	(Turkish Football Federation) Bursaspor
12	GK	Ahmet Şen	3 February 1999 (aged 19)	(Turkish Football Federation) Galatasaray
2	DF	Mert Yılmaz	8 March 1999 (aged 19)	(German Football Association) Bayern Munich II
3	DF	Berk Çetin	2 February 2000 (aged 18)	(German Football Association) Borussia Mönchengladbach
4	DF	Gökay Güney	19 May 1999 (aged 19)	(Turkish Football Federation) Galatasaray
5	DF	Alpay Çelebi	4 April 1999 (aged 19)	(Turkish Football Federation) Beşiktaş
7	DF	Doğukan Sinik	21 January 1999 (aged 19)	(Turkish Football Federation) Antalyaspor
15	DF	Burak Kapacak	8 December 1999 (aged 18)	(Turkish Football Federation) Bursaspor
17	DF	Tayyip Talha Sanuç	17 December 1999 (aged 18)	(Turkish Football Federation) Karabükspor
6	MF	Oğuz Kağan Güçtekin	6 April 1999 (aged 19)	(Turkish Football Federation) Fenerbahçe
8	MF	**Abdülkadir Ömür**	25 June 1999 (aged 19)	(Turkish Football Federation) Trabzonspor
10	MF	Muhayer Oktay	28 April 1999 (aged 19)	(German Football Association) Fortuna Düsseldorf
13	MF	Umut Güneş	16 March 2000 (aged 18)	(German Football Association) VfB Stuttgart
16	MF	Aksel Aktaş	15 July 1999 (aged 19)	(French Football Federation) Sochaux
18	MF	Doğukan İnci	19 March 1999 (aged 19)	(Turkish Football Federation) Karşıyaka S.K.
20	MF	Rahmetullah Berişbek	22 March 1999 (aged 19)	(Turkish Football Federation) Gençlerbirliği
9	FW	**Güven Yalçın**	18 January 1999 (aged 19)	(German Football Association) Bayer Leverkusen
11	FW	Metehan Güçlü	2 April 1999 (aged 19)	(French Football Federation) Paris Saint-Germain Youth
14	FW	**Ahmed Kutucu**	1 March 2000 (aged 18)	(German Football Association) Schalke 04 Youth
19	FW	İlker Karakaş	11 January 1999 (aged 19)	(Turkish Football Federation) Gençlerbirliği

=== Ukraine ===
Ukraine named their squad on 13 July 2018.

Head coach: Oleksandr Petrakov

No.	Pos.	Player	Date of birth (age)	Club
1	GK	Vladyslav Kucheruk	14 February 1999 (aged 19)	(Ukrainian Association of Football) Dynamo Kyiv
12	GK	Dmytro Riznyk	30 January 1999 (aged 19)	(Ukrainian Association of Football) Vorskla Poltava
2	DF	**Valeriy Bondar**	27 February 1999 (aged 19)	(Ukrainian Association of Football) Shakhtar Donetsk
3	DF	Oleksandr Safronov	11 June 1999 (aged 19)	(Ukrainian Association of Football) Dnipro-1
4	DF	**Denys Popov**	17 February 1999 (aged 19)	(Ukrainian Association of Football) Dynamo Kyiv
5	DF	**Vitalii Mykolenko**	29 May 1999 (aged 19)	(Ukrainian Association of Football) Dynamo Kyiv
17	DF	**Yukhym Konoplya**	26 August 1999 (aged 18)	(Ukrainian Association of Football) Shakhtar Donetsk
18	DF	Oleh Veremiyenko	13 February 1999 (aged 19)	(Ukrainian Association of Football) Karpaty Lviv
22	DF	Ihor Snurnitsyn	7 March 2000 (aged 18)	(Ukrainian Association of Football) Olimpik Donetsk
6	MF	Maksym Chekh	3 January 1999 (aged 19)	(Ukrainian Association of Football) Shakhtar Donetsk
8	MF	Oleksiy Khakhlyov	6 February 1999 (aged 19)	(Royal Spanish Football Federation) Deportivo Alavés
9	MF	Viktor Korniyenko	14 February 1999 (aged 19)	(Ukrainian Association of Football) Shakhtar Donetsk
10	MF	Serhiy Buletsa	16 February 1999 (aged 19)	(Ukrainian Association of Football) Dynamo Kyiv
14	MF	Oleksandr Byelyayev	4 October 1999 (aged 18)	(Ukrainian Association of Football) Dnipro-1
15	MF	Kyrylo Dryshlyuk	16 September 1999 (aged 18)	(Ukrainian Association of Football) Zirka Kropyvnytskyi
16	MF	Mykola Musolitin	21 January 1999 (aged 19)	(Ukrainian Association of Football) Chornomorets Odesa
19	MF	Andriy Remenyuk	3 February 1999 (aged 19)	(Ukrainian Association of Football) Karpaty Lviv
21	MF	**Heorhiy Tsitaishvili**	18 November 2000 (aged 17)	(Ukrainian Association of Football) Dynamo Kyiv
7	FW	Andriy Kulakov	28 April 1999 (aged 19)	(Ukrainian Association of Football) Shakhtar Donetsk
11	FW	Vladyslav Supryaha	15 February 2000 (aged 18)	(Ukrainian Association of Football) Dnipro-1

=== France ===
France named their squad on 12 July 2018.

Head coach: Bernard Diomède

No.	Pos.	Player	Date of birth (age)	Club
1	GK	Didier Desprez	13 March 1999 (aged 19)	(French Football Federation) Lens
16	GK	**Yehvann Diouf**	16 November 1999 (aged 18)	(French Football Federation) Troyes
2	DF	Mahamadou Dembélé	10 April 1999 (aged 19)	(Austrian Football Association) Liefering
3	DF	**Sikou Niakaté**	10 July 1999 (aged 19)	(French Football Federation) Valenciennes
4	DF	**Boubacar Kamara**	23 November 1999 (aged 18)	(French Football Federation) Marseille
5	DF	Malang Sarr	23 January 1999 (aged 19)	(French Football Federation) Nice
13	DF	Nicolas Cozza	8 January 1999 (aged 19)	(French Football Federation) Montpellier
15	DF	Thomas Basila	30 April 1999 (aged 19)	(French Football Federation) Nantes
6	MF	Aurélien Nguiamba	18 January 1999 (aged 19)	(French Football Federation) Nancy
8	MF	Michaël Cuisance	16 August 1999 (aged 18)	(German Football Association) Borussia Mönchengladbach
10	MF	**Rafik Guitane**	26 May 1999 (aged 19)	(French Football Federation) Rennes
12	MF	Sambou Sissoko	27 April 1999 (aged 19)	(French Football Federation) Tours
14	MF	Isaac Matondo	24 March 1999 (aged 19)	(French Football Federation) Rennes
20	MF	Boubakary Soumaré	27 February 1999 (aged 19)	(French Football Federation) Lille
7	FW	**Moussa Diaby**	7 July 1999 (aged 19)	(French Football Federation) Paris Saint-Germain
9	FW	**Myziane Maolida**	14 February 1999 (aged 19)	(French Football Federation) Lyon
11	FW	Lenny Pintor	5 August 2000 (aged 17)	(French Football Federation) Brest
17	FW	Yacine Adli	29 July 2000 (aged 17)	(French Football Federation) Paris Saint-Germain
18	FW	Nabil Alioui	18 February 1999 (aged 19)	(French Football Federation) Monaco
19	FW	**Amine Gouiri**	16 February 2000 (aged 18)	(French Football Federation) Lyon

=== England ===
England named their squad on 16 July 2018.

Head coach: Paul Simpson

No.	Pos.	Player	Date of birth (age)	Club
1	GK	Ellery Balcombe	15 October 1999 (aged 18)	(The Football Association) Brentford
13	GK	Jamie Cumming	4 September 1999 (aged 18)	(The Football Association) Chelsea
2	DF	Dujon Sterling	24 October 1999 (aged 18)	(The Football Association) Coventry City
5	DF	Japhet Tanganga	31 March 1999 (aged 19)	(The Football Association) Tottenham Hotspur
6	DF	**Trevoh Chalobah**	5 July 1999 (aged 19)	(The Football Association) Chelsea
12	DF	**Tariq Lamptey**	30 September 2000 (aged 17)	(The Football Association) Chelsea
14	DF	Edward Francis	11 September 1999 (aged 18)	(Royal Dutch Football Association) Almere City
20	DF	Nathan Ferguson	6 October 2000 (aged 17)	(The Football Association) West Bromwich Albion
3	MF	Adam Lewis	8 November 1999 (aged 18)	(The Football Association) Liverpool
4	MF	Max Sanders	4 January 1999 (aged 19)	(The Football Association) Brighton & Hove Albion
7	MF	Elliot Embleton	2 April 1999 (aged 19)	(The Football Association) Sunderland
8	MF	Marcus Tavernier	22 March 1999 (aged 19)	(The Football Association) Middlesbrough
15	MF	Tom Bayliss	6 April 1999 (aged 19)	(The Football Association) Coventry City
17	MF	**Conor Gallagher**	6 February 2000 (aged 18)	(The Football Association) Chelsea
18	MF	Kelland Watts	3 November 1999 (aged 18)	(The Football Association) Newcastle United
19	MF	Nya Kirby	31 January 2000 (aged 18)	(The Football Association) Crystal Palace
9	FW	**George Hirst**	15 February 1999 (aged 19)	(Royal Belgian Football Association) OH Leuven
10	FW	**Ben Brereton**	18 April 1999 (aged 19)	(The Football Association) Nottingham Forest
11	FW	Ben Morris	6 July 1999 (aged 19)	(The Football Association) Ipswich Town
16	FW	Niall Ennis	20 May 1999 (aged 19)	(The Football Association) Wolverhampton Wanderers
