= Tlumak =

Tlumak (Ukrainian: Тлумак) is a Ukrainian surname. Notable people with the surname include:

- Andriy Tlumak (born 1979), Ukrainian footballer and manager
- Yuriy Tlumak (born 2002), Ukrainian footballer, son of Andriy
