= Ahmed Kutucu =

Turkish footballer (born 2000)

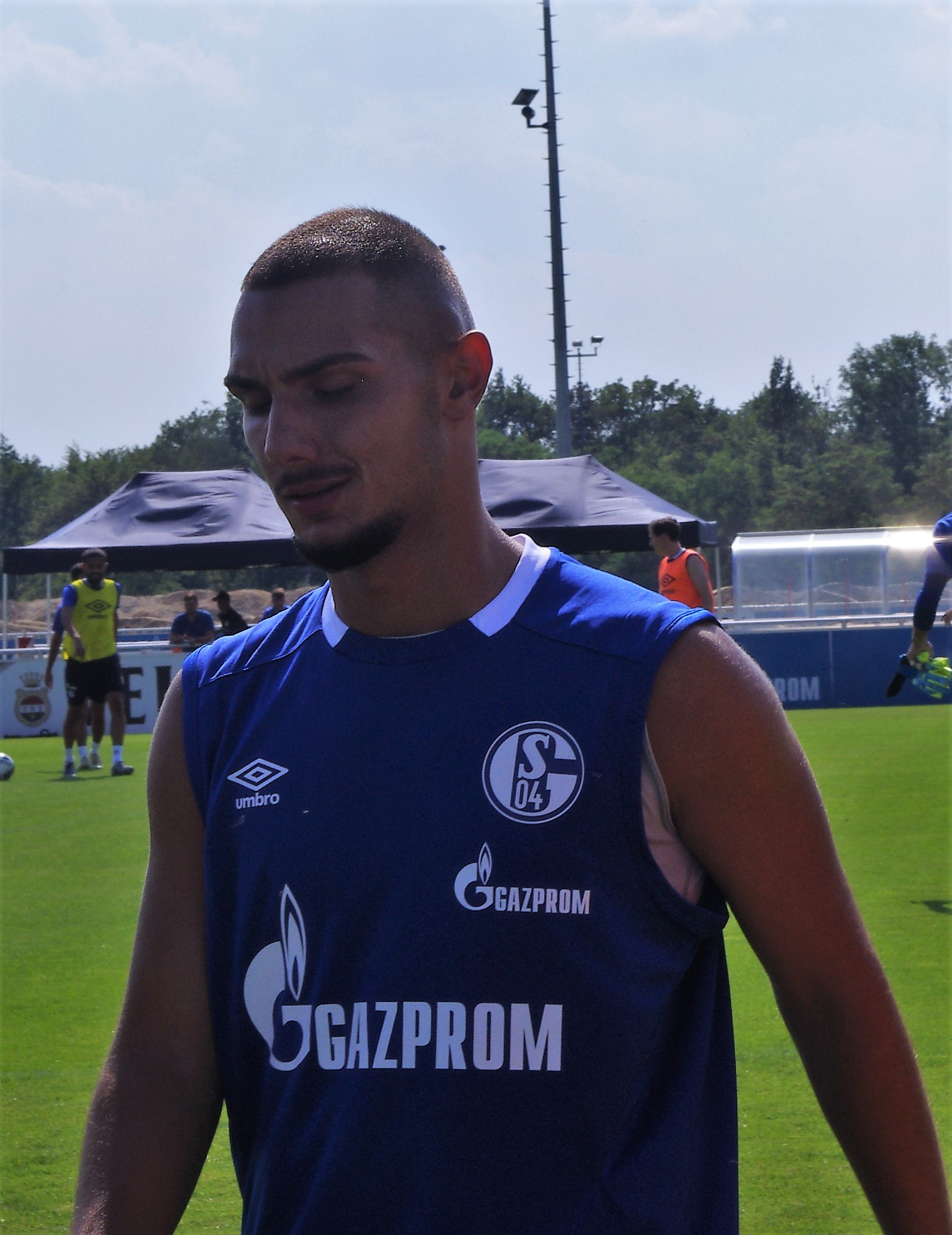
- Kutucu with Schalke 04 in 2019

Personal information
- Full name: Ahmed Kutucu
- Date of birth: 1 March 2000 (age 26)
- Place of birth: Gelsenkirchen, Germany
- Height: 1.81 m (5 ft 11 in)
- Positions: Winger; wide midfielder

Team information
- Current team: Çaykur Rizespor (on loan from Galatasaray)
- Number: 53

Youth career
- 2003–2006: Sportreunde Haverkamp
- 2006–2011: Rot-Weiss Essen
- 2011–2018: Schalke 04

Senior career*
Years	Team	Apps	(Gls)
2018–2021	Schalke 04	45	(5)
2019–2020	Schalke 04 II	3	(3)
2021	→ Heracles Almelo (loan)	15	(0)
2021–2023	İstanbul Başakşehir	4	(0)
2022–2023	→ SV Sandhausen (loan)	32	(3)
2023–2025	Eyüpspor	39	(22)
2025–	Galatasaray	24	(1)
2026–	→ Çaykur Rizespor (loan)	0	(0)

International career^{‡}
2017	Turkey U17	3	(1)
2018	Turkey U19	3	(0)
2019	Turkey U21	3	(0)
2019–	Turkey	3	(0)
- * Club domestic league appearances and goals as of 10 June 2026 ‡ National team caps and goals as of 11:11, 11 June 2025 (UTC)

Ahmed Kutucu (born 1 March 2000) is a professional footballer who plays as a centre-forward for Turkish club Çaykur Rizespor. Born in Germany, he represents the Turkey national team.

== Club career ==
Kutucu began his youth career with Sportreunde Haverkamp in 2003, before moving to the youth team of Rot-Weiss Essen in 2006. In 2011, he joined the youth sector of Schalke 04.

On 11 December 2018, Kutucu made his first team debut for Schalke in the UEFA Champions League, coming on as a substitute in the 72nd minute for Cedric Teuchert in the 1–0 home win against Lokomotiv Moscow. He scored his first Bundesliga goal on 22 December 2018, coming on as a substitute in the 73rd minute to replace Yevhen Konoplyanka in a 3–1 away win against VfB Stuttgart.

On 21 January 2021, Kutucu joined Eredivisie club Heracles Almelo on a loan deal until the end of the season.

=== İstanbul Başakşehir ===
On 4 July 2021, Kutucu moved to Turkish club İstanbul Başakşehir.

==== SV Sandhausen (loan) ====
On 12 January 2022, Kutucu agreed to join 2. Bundesliga club SV Sandhausen on loan until the end of the season. On 28 June 2022, his loan was extended for a further year.

=== Eyüpspor ===
On 13 July 2023, Kutucu signed with TFF First League club Eyüpspor.

=== Galatasaray ===
On January 23, 2025, Kutucu was purchased by Galatasaray in a bid to bolster their weakening attacking prowess.

==== Çaykur Rizespor (loan) ====
On July 19, 2026, he signed a loan agreement with Çaykur Rizespor until the end of the 2026–27 season.

== International career ==
Kutucu was included in Turkey's squad for the 2017 FIFA U-17 World Cup in India. He made his debut on 6 October 2017 in the first group match, opening the scoring for Turkey with a header in the 18th minute against New Zealand, with the match finishing as a 1–1 draw. He played in Turkey's remaining two matches, where they were eliminated in the tournament's group stage. The following year, he was included in Turkey's squad for the 2018 UEFA European Under-19 Championship in Finland. He played all three matches for Turkey, with the team being eliminated in the group stage.

== Career statistics ==
=== Club ===
As of match played 4 February 2026

Appearances and goals by club, season and competition
Club	Season	League			National cup (Note: Includes DFB-Pokal, Turkish Cup)		Europe		Other		Total	
Club	Season	Division	Apps	Goals	Apps	Goals	Apps	Goals	Apps	Goals	Apps	Goals
Schalke 04	2018–19	Bundesliga	13	2	2	1	1 (Note: Appearances in UEFA Champions League)	0	—		16	3
Schalke 04	2019–20	Bundesliga	25	3	3	0	—		—		28	3
Schalke 04	2020–21	Bundesliga	7	0	1	0	—		—		8	0
Schalke 04	Total		45	5	6	1	1	0	—		52	6
Schalke 04 II	2018–19	Oberliga Westfalen	1	2	—		—		—		1	2
Schalke 04 II	2020–21	Regionalliga West	2	1	—		—		—		2	1
Schalke 04 II	Total		3	3	—		—		—		3	3
Heracles Almelo (loan)	2020–21	Eredivisie	15	0	—		—		—		15	0
İstanbul Başakşehir	2021–22	Süper Lig	4	0	1	1	—		—		5	1
SV Sandhausen (loan)	2021–22	2. Bundesliga	10	1	—		—		—		10	1
SV Sandhausen (loan)	2022–23	2. Bundesliga	22	2	2	1	—		—		24	3
SV Sandhausen (loan)	Total		32	3	2	1	—		—		36	4
Eyüpspor	2023–24	TFF First League	21	14	1	0	—		—		22	14
Eyüpspor	2024–25	Süper Lig	18	8	2	1	—		—		20	9
Eyüpspor	Total		39	22	3	1	—		—		42	23
Galatasaray	2024–25	Süper Lig	14	1	4	1	0	0	—		18	2
Galatasaray	2025–26	Süper Lig	8	0	3	2	1	0	2 (Note: Appearances in Turkish Super Cup)	0	14	2
Galatasaray	Total		22	1	7	3	1	0	2	0	32	4
Career total			160	34	19	7	2	0	2	0	183	41

=== International ===
As of match played on 11 June 2025

Appearances and goals by national team and year
National team	Year	Apps	Goals
Turkey	2019	1	0
Turkey	2020	1	0
Turkey	2025	1	0
Total		3	0

== Honours ==
Eyüpspor

- TFF First League: 2023–24

Galatasaray

- Süper Lig: 2024–25, 2025–26
- Turkish Cup: 2024–25
