= 2024–25 Eyüpspor season =

Eyüpspor
2024–25 season
- Chairman: Murat Özkaya
- Manager: Arda Turan
- Stadium: Recep Tayyip Erdoğan Stadium
- Süper Lig: 6th
- Turkish Cup: Group stage
- Top goalscorer: League: Mame Thiam (15); All: Mame Thiam (16)
- Average home league attendance: 2,648
- Biggest win: Eyüpspor 4–1 Bodrum; Eyüpspor 3–0 Samsunspor; Eyüpspor 4–1 Etimesgut Belediyespor; Antalyaspor 1–4 Eyüpspor; Eyüpspor 3–0 Alanyaspor

The 2024–25 season marked the first-ever appearance of Eyüpspor in the Turkish Süper Lig. In addition, the team also competed in the Turkish Cup.

== Transfers ==
=== In ===
Pos.	Player	Transferred from	Fee	Date	Source
MF	(Turkey) Dorukhan Toköz	(Turkey) Adana Demirspor	Undisclosed	1 July 2024	
FW	(Senegal) Mame Thiam	(Turkey) Pendikspor	Undisclosed	16 August 2024	
DF	(Turkey) Tayfur Bingöl	(Turkey) Beşiktaş	Loan	16 August 2024	
MF	(England) Jonjo Shelvey	(Turkey) Çaykur Rizespor	Free	28 August 2024	
DF	(France) Léo Dubois	(Turkey) Galatasaray	Undisclosed	6 September 2024	
DF	(Portugal) Rúben Vezo	(Greece) Olympiacos	Loan	6 September 2024	
MF	(Turkey) Emre Mor	(Turkey) Fenerbahçe	Loan	13 September 2024	

=== Out ===
Pos.	Player	Transferred to	Fee	Date	Source
MF	(Turkey) Tugay Kacar		Released	11 September 2024	
MF	(Turkey) Ahmet Yazar	(Turkey) Kepezspor	Loan	12 September 2024	
DF	(Turkey) Ahmet Özkaya	(Turkey) Beykoz Anadolu Spor	Loan	13 September 2024	
DF	(Austria) Berkay Doğan		Released	25 September 2024	
MF	(England) Jonjo Shelvey	(England) Burnley	Free	20 January 2025	
FW	(Belgium) Gianni Bruno	(Turkey) Iğdır	Free	21 January 2025	

== Pre-season and friendlies ==
22 July 2024 Friendly	Eyüpspor	3–0	İstanbulspor
		Report

22 July 2024 Friendly	Eyüpspor	0–0	Esenler Erokspor
		Report

== Competitions ==
=== Overall record ===
Competition	First match	Last match	Starting round	Record							
Competition	First match	Last match	Starting round	Pld	W	D	L	GF	GA	GD	Win %
Süper Lig	11 August 2024	25 May 2025	Matchday 1	19	9	6	4	32	19	+13	47.37
Turkish Cup	17 December 2024		Fifth round	2	2	0	0	5	1	+4	100.00
Total				21	11	6	4	37	20	+17	52.38

Last updated: 19 January 2025
Source: Competitions

=== Süper Lig ===
==== League table ====
Pos	Team	Pld	W	D	L	GF	GA	GD	Pts	Qualification or relegation
4	Beşiktaş	36	17	11	8	59	36	+23	62	Qualification for the Europa League second qualifying round
5	Başakşehir	36	16	6	14	60	56	+4	54	Qualification for the Conference League second qualifying round
6	Eyüpspor	36	15	8	13	52	47	+5	53	
7	Trabzonspor	36	13	12	11	58	45	+13	51	
8	Göztepe	36	13	11	12	59	50	+9	50	

Source: Süper Lig
Rules for classification: 1) Points; 2) Head-to-head points; 3) Head-to-head goal difference; 4) Head-to-head goals scored; 5) Goal difference; 6) Goals scored; 7) Play-off.
(Note: Head-to-head record is used only after all the matches between the teams in question have been played)

==== Results summary ====
Overall								Home						Away					
Pld	W	D	L	GF	GA	GD	Pts	W	D	L	GF	GA	GD	W	D	L	GF	GA	GD
19	9	6	4	32	19	+13	33	6	2	1	18	6	+12	3	4	3	14	13	+1

Last updated: 19 January 2025.

==== Results by round ====
Round	1	2	3	4	5	6	7	8	9	10	11	12	13	14	15	16	17	18	19	20
Ground	A	H	A	H	A	A	H	A	H	A	H	A	H	A	H	A	H	A		H
Result	D	W	W	D	D	L	W	L	W	D	W	W	L	D	W	L	D	W	B	W
Position	8	3	3	5	5	7	6	7	5	5	5	4	4							

Updated to match(es) played on 19 January 2025. Source:
A = Away; H = Home; W = Win; D = Draw; L = Loss

==== Matches ====
11 August 2024 1	Alanyaspor	1–1	Eyüpspor	Alanya
21:45 UTC+3	Córdova 76'	Report	Sáiz 64'	Stadium: Alanya Oba Stadium; Referee: Oğuzhan Çakır

19 August 2024 2	Eyüpspor	4–1	Bodrum	Kasımpaşa
21:00 UTC+3	Bruno 46'; Thiam 55'; Sáiz 86'; Akbunar 90+5'	Report	Dimitrov 30'	Stadium: Recep Tayyip Erdoğan Stadium; Referee: Halil Umut Meler

24 August 2024 3	Sivasspor	0–1	Eyüpspor	Sivas
19:15 UTC+3		Report	Kutucu 8'	Stadium: 4 Eylül Stadium; Referee: Zorbay Küçük

1 September 2024 4	Eyüpspor	0–0	Trabzonspor	Kasımpaşa
19:15 UTC+3		Report		Stadium: Recep Tayyip Erdoğan Stadium; Referee: Atilla Karaoğlan

15 September 2024 5	Kayserispor	2–2	Eyüpspor	Kayseri
17:00 UTC+3				Stadium: Kadir Has Stadium

22 September 2024 6	Beşiktaş	2–1	Eyüpspor	Beşiktaş
20:00 UTC+3				Stadium: Beşiktaş Stadium

29 September 2024 7	Eyüpspor	3–2	Gaziantep	Kasımpaşa
16:00 UTC+3				Stadium: Recep Tayyip Erdoğan Stadium

6 October 2024 8	Konyaspor	2–1	Eyüpspor	Konya
13:30 UTC+3				Stadium: Konya Metropolitan Municipality Stadium

19 October 2024 9	Eyüpspor	1–0	Göztepe	Kasımpaşa
19:00 UTC+3		Report		Stadium: Recep Tayyip Erdoğan Stadium; Referee: Turgut Doman

28 October 2024 10	İstanbul Başakşehir	1–1	Eyüpspor	Başakşehir
17:00 UTC+3	Opoku 59' (pen.)	Report	Thiam 28'	Stadium: Başakşehir Fatih Terim Stadium; Referee: Abdullah Buğra Taşkınsoy

3 November 2024 11	Eyüpspor	2–0	Hatayspor	Kasımpaşa
16:00 UTC+3	Thiam 11', 60'	Report		Stadium: Recep Tayyip Erdoğan Stadium; Referee: Yasin Kol

9 November 2024 12	Adana Demirspor	0–1	Eyüpspor	Adana
19:00 UTC+3		Report	Kutucu 9'	Stadium: New Adana Stadium; Referee: Direnç Tonusluoğlu

23 November 2024 13	Eyüpspor	1–2	Çaykur Rizespor	Kasımpaşa
13:30 UTC+3	Kutucu 27'	Report	Varešanović 55'; Sowe 75'	Stadium: Recep Tayyip Erdoğan Stadium; Referee: Ali Şansalan

1 December 2024 14	Galatasaray	2–2	Eyüpspor	Sarıyer
19:00 UTC+3	Yılmaz 45+5'; Sallai 47'		Akbaba 13'; Ampem 71'	Stadium: Rams Park; Referee: Oğuzhan Çakır

8 December 2024 15	Eyüpspor	3–0	Samsunspor	Kasımpaşa
13:30 UTC+3	Thiam 54', 69'; Akbunar 64'	Report		Stadium: Recep Tayyip Erdoğan Stadium; Referee: Atilla Karaoğlan

13 December 2024 16	Kasımpaşa	2–0	Eyüpspor	Kasımpaşa
20:00 UTC+3	Brekalo 57'; Barák 82'	Report		Stadium: Recep Tayyip Erdoğan Stadium; Referee: Halil Umut Meler

20 December 2024 17	Eyüpspor	1–1	Fenerbahçe	Kasımpaşa
20:00 UTC+3	Akbaba (yellow card) 13'; Kutucu 26', (yellow card) 44'; Yalçın (yellow card) 45+4'; Erkin (yellow card) 45+5'; Toköz (yellow card) 73'; Thiam (yellow card) 88'	Report	En-Nesyri 45+4', (yellow card) 90+8'; Söyüncü (yellow card) 53'; Saint-Maximin (yellow card) 72'; Ünder (yellow card) 90+8'	Stadium: Recep Tayyip Erdoğan Stadium; Referee: Emre Kargın

4 January 2025 18	Antalyaspor	1–4	Eyüpspor	Antalya
16:00 UTC+3	Safouri 48'	Report	Thiam 32', 35' (pen.); Kutucu 41'; Ampem 62'	Stadium: Antalya Stadium; Referee: Muhammet Ali Metoğlu

19	Bye

19 January 2025 20	Eyüpspor	3–0	Alanyaspor	Kasımpaşa
19:00 UTC+3	Yalçın 45+2'; Akbaba 65' (pen.); Thiam 75'	Report		Stadium: Recep Tayyip Erdoğan Stadium; Referee: Yasin Kol

=== Turkish Cup ===
17 December 2024 Fifth round	Eyüpspor	4–1	Etimesgut Belediyespor	Kasımpaşa
13:00 UTC+3	Toköz (yellow card) 16'; Mor 27'; Bruno 34', 51' (pen.), 73' (pen.)		Koca (yellow card) 19'; Koç 44', (red card) 71'	Stadium: Recep Tayyip Erdoğan Stadium

==== Group stage ====
Pos	Team	Pld	W	D	L	GF	GA	GD	Pts
1	Konyaspor	3	2	1	0	4	1	+3	7
2	Galatasaray	3	1	2	0	6	3	+3	5
3	İstanbul Başakşehir	3	1	2	0	6	3	+3	5
4	Eyüpspor	3	1	1	1	2	3	−1	4
5	Çorum	3	1	0	2	3	6	−3	3
6	Boluspor	3	0	0	3	2	7	−5	0

8 January 2025 1	Eyüpspor	1–0	Boluspor	Kasımpaşa
15:30 UTC+3	Kutucu 70'			Stadium: Recep Tayyip Erdoğan Stadium

4 February 2025 2	Konyaspor	3-1	Eyüpspor	Konya
16:00	Aleksic 45+3'; Bostan 48'; Ndao 90+8'		Thiam 85'	Stadium: Medaş Konya Büyükşehir

27 February 2025 3	Eyüpspor	v	İstanbul Başakşehir	Istanbul, Turkey
19:00
