= Andriy Artym =

Ukrainian footballer (born 2000)

Personal information
- Full name: Andriy Yaroslavovych Artym
- Date of birth: 21 February 2000 (age 26)
- Place of birth: Lviv, Ukraine
- Height: 1.85 m (6 ft 1 in)
- Position: Goalkeeper

Team information
- Current team: Arka Pawłów
- Number: 31

Youth career
- 2011–2019: Karpaty Lviv

Senior career*
| Years | Team | Apps | (Gls) |
| 2019–2020 | Karpaty Lviv | 3 | (0) |
| 2020 | → Ahrobiznes Volochysk (loan) | 1 | (0) |
| 2020–2022 | Ahrobiznes Volochysk | 2 | (0) |
| 2022–2023 | Bałtyk Koszalin | 29 | (0) |
| 2023–2024 | Polonia Przemyśl | 16 | (0) |
| 2024 | Siarka Tarnobrzeg | 8 | (0) |
| 2024–2025 | Alit Ożarów | 12 | (0) |
| 2025– | Arka Pawłów | 16 | (0) |
- * Club domestic league appearances and goals as of 22:45, 24 June 2025 (UTC)

Andriy Artym (Ukrainian: Андрій Ярославович Артим; born 21 February 2000) is a Ukrainian professional footballer who plays as a goalkeeper for Polish club Arka Pawłów.

== Club career ==
Artym is the product of the Karpaty Lviv's youth system.

He was promoted to the senior squad in November 2019 and made his debut for Karpaty Lviv playing 90 minutes in a home loss against Olimpik Donetsk on 24 November 2019 in the Ukrainian Premier League.

== International career ==
In October 2018, Artym was called up to the Ukraine national under-19 football team, but did not make a debut.
