= Alexandru Boiciuc =

Moldovan professional footballer

Personal information
- Date of birth: 21 August 1997 (age 29)
- Place of birth: Chișinău, Moldova
- Height: 1.91 m (6 ft 3 in)
- Position: Striker

Team information
- Current team: Bihor Oradea
- Number: 32

Youth career
- –2015: CSMS Iași

Senior career*
Years	Team	Apps	(Gls)
2015–2017	Politehnica Iași	20	(2)
2016	→ Rapid CFR Suceava (loan)	9	(2)
2017	→ Milsami Orhei (loan)	13	(6)
2017	Târgu Mureș	5	(1)
2017–2018	Milsami Orhei	4	(2)
2018–2019	Vejle	3	(0)
2018	→ Sheriff Tiraspol (loan)	9	(2)
2019	→ Sfântul Gheorghe (loan)	13	(5)
2019–2020	Karpaty Lviv	16	(2)
2020–2021	Academica Clinceni	13	(0)
2021	Turris	9	(0)
2021–2022	Universitatea Cluj	34	(6)
2022–2023	Gloria Buzău	24	(8)
2023–2024	Steaua București	22	(3)
2024–2026	Concordia Chiajna	37	(15)
2026–	Bihor Oradea	17	(3)

International career^{‡}
2015	Moldova U19	4	(1)
2015–2018	Moldova U21	21	(3)
2018–	Moldova	14	(0)
- * Club domestic league appearances and goals as of 5 September 2026 ‡ National team caps and goals as of 26 March 2026

Alexandru Boiciuc (born 21 August 1997) is a Moldovan professional footballer who plays as a forward for Liga II club Bihor Oradea and the Moldova national team.

== Career ==
=== Politehnica Iași ===
Alexandru Boiciuc made his professional debut aged 18 in a league match against Viitorul Constanța. He came on for Bojan Golubovic in the 90th minute. He scored his first career goal against Pandurii as his team lost 5–2 in a league match.

=== Vejle Boldklub ===
Boiciuc signed for Danish club Vejle Boldklub in January 2018.

On 4 July 2018, after only making 3 appearances for Vejle, Boiciuc went on loan to Moldovan club Sheriff Tiraspol.

=== Italy ===
On 25 February 2021, he joined Italian third-tier club Turris.

== Career statistics ==
=== International ===
As of match played 26 March 2026

Appearances and goals by national team and year
National team	Year	Apps	Goals
Moldova
Moldova	2018	4	0
Moldova	2019	4	0
Moldova	2019	2	0
Moldova	2025	3	0
Moldova	2026	1	0
Total		14	0

== Honours ==
Vejle

- Danish 1st Division: 2017–18

Milsami Orhei

- Divizia Națională runner-up: 2017

Sheriff Tiraspol

- Divizia Națională: 2018

Sfîntul Gheorghe

- Cupa Moldovei runner-up: 2018–19
