= Marvin Martins =

Luxembourgish footballer (born 1995)

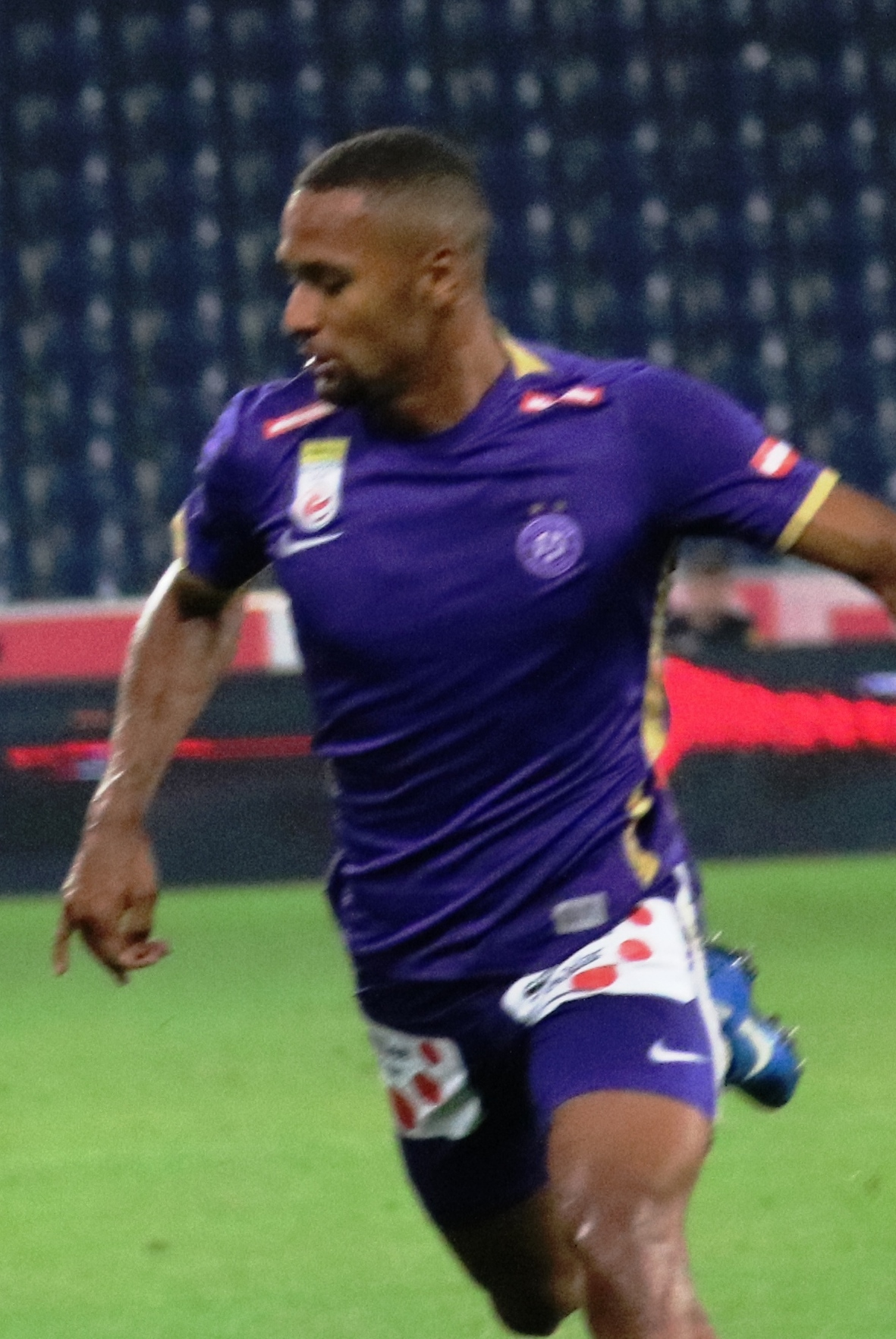
- Martins in 2022

Personal information
- Full name: Marvin Martins Santos da Graça
- Date of birth: 17 February 1995 (age 31)
- Place of birth: Luxembourg
- Height: 1.85 m (6 ft 1 in)
- Position: Defender

Team information
- Current team: Liepāja
- Number: 4

Senior career*
| Years | Team | Apps | (Gls) |
| 2013–2018 | Jeunesse Esch | 74 | (1) |
| 2018–2019 | Progrès Niederkorn | 24 | (3) |
| 2019–2020 | Karpaty Lviv | 22 | (1) |
| 2020–2021 | Casa Pia | 28 | (2) |
| 2021–2025 | Austria Wien | 69 | (1) |
| 2025 | Almere City | 12 | (1) |
| 2025–2026 | Winterthur | 11 | (0) |
| 2026– | Liepāja | 25 | (0) |

International career^{‡}
| 2012 | Luxembourg U17 | 3 | (0) |
| 2013 | Luxembourg U19 | 3 | (0) |
| 2014–2016 | Luxembourg U21 | 7 | (0) |
| 2014– | Luxembourg | 42 | (3) |
- * Club domestic league appearances and goals as of 12 November 2026 ‡ National team caps and goals as of 29 September 2026

Marvin Martins Santos da Graça, known as Marvin Martins (born 17 February 1995) is a Luxembourgish professional footballer who plays as defender for Virslīga club Liepāja.

== Club career ==
On 4 January 2025, Martins signed a six-month contract with Almere City in the Netherlands.

== International career ==
Da Graça was born in Luxembourg and is of Cape Verdean descent. Da Graça made his first international appearance in the away match against Italy on 4 June 2014 (1–1), in which he substituted Stefano Bensi in the 79th minute.

=== International goals ===
Scores and results list Luxembourg's goal tally first.

| # | Date | Venue | Opponent | Score | Result | Competition |
|---|---|---|---|---|---|---|
| 1. | 9 November 2017 | Stade Josy Barthel, Luxembourg City, Luxembourg | Hungary | 2–1 | 2–1 | Friendly |
| 2. | 25 March 2022 | Stade de Luxembourg, Luxembourg City, Luxembourg | Northern Ireland | 1–1 | 1–3 | Friendly |
| 3. | 22 September 2022 | Başakşehir Fatih Terim Stadium, Istanbul, Turkey | Turkey | 1–0 | 3–3 | 2022–23 UEFA Nations League |
