= Andriy Remenyuk =

Ukrainian footballer

Personal information
- Full name: Andriy Serhiyovych Remenyuk
- Date of birth: 3 February 1999 (age 27)
- Place of birth: Hnivan, Ukraine
- Height: 1.70 m (5 ft 7 in)
- Position: Forward

Team information
- Current team: Avia Świdnik
- Number: 9

Youth career
- –2016: UFK Lviv

Senior career*
Years	Team	Apps	(Gls)
2016–2020	Karpaty Lviv	8	(0)
2018	→ Rukh Vynnyky (loan)	11	(1)
2019–2020	→ Kalush (loan)	13	(4)
2020–2021	Kryvbas Kryvyi Rih	17	(2)
2021–2024	Metalist 1925 Kharkiv	54	(2)
2024–	Avia Świdnik	59	(24)

International career
2017–2018	Ukraine U19	10	(0)
2018	Ukraine U20	1	(0)
- * Club domestic league appearances and goals as of 22:28, 31 May 2026 (UTC)

Andriy Remenyuk (Ukrainian: Андрій Сергійович Ременюк; born 3 February 1999) is a Ukrainian professional footballer who plays as a forward for Polish II liga club Avia Świdnik.

== Career ==
Remenyuk is a product of the UFK Lviv's academy, and played for Karpaty Lviv in the Ukrainian Premier League Reserves and Under 19 Championship.

He made his senior debut for Karpaty as a substitute in a Ukrainian Premier League loss to Shakhtar Donetsk on 4 March 2018.

== Honours ==
Avia Świdnik

- III liga, group IV: 2025–26
- Polish Cup (Lublin regionals): 2024–25, 2025–26
- Polish Cup (Lublin subdistrict regionals): 2024–25, 2025–26
