= Yuriy Tlumak =

Ukrainian footballer

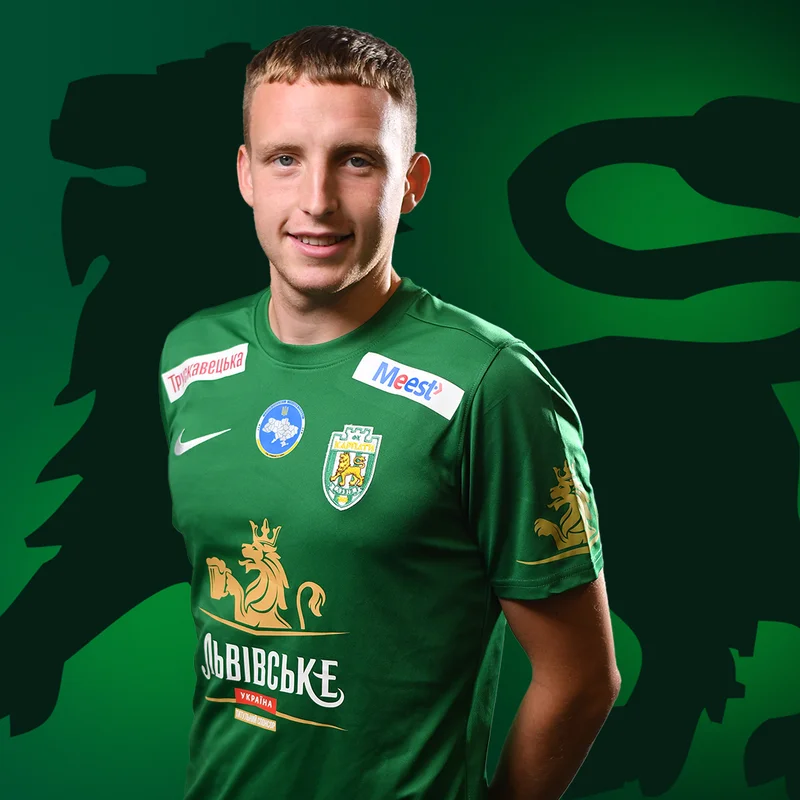

Personal information
- Full name: Yuriy Andriyovych Tlumak
- Date of birth: 11 July 2002 (age 24)
- Place of birth: Lviv, Ukraine
- Height: 1.80 m (5 ft 11 in)
- Position: Midfielder

Team information
- Current team: Inhulets Petrove
- Number: 10

Youth career
- 2011–2020: Karpaty Lviv

Senior career*
Years	Team	Apps	(Gls)
2020	Karpaty Lviv	1	(0)
2020–2022	Dynamo Kyiv	0	(0)
2021	→ Chornomorets Odesa (loan)	13	(1)
2022–2024	Zorya Luhansk	1	(0)
2022–2023	→ Karpaty Lviv (loan)	9	(1)
2024–2025	Karpaty Lviv	8	(1)
2024	→ Karpaty-2 Lviv	6	(0)
2025	Rukh Lviv	3	(0)
2025	Nyva Ternopil	17	(1)
2026	Inhulets Petrove	12	(0)
2026	SC Poltava-2	6	(0)
2026-	SC Poltava	9	(1)
- * Club domestic league appearances and goals as of 4 June 2026

Yuriy Andriyovych Tlumak (Ukrainian: Юрій Андрійович Тлумак; born 11 July 2002) is a Ukrainian professional footballer who plays as a midfielder for Inhulets Petrove.

== Career ==
Tlumak was born in Lviv and is a product of Karpaty Lviv academy. He played for the Karpaty youth teams of different levels and participated in the Ukrainian Premier League Reserves and Under 19 championship.

He made his debut for Karpaty as a second-half substitute against Lviv on 27 June 2020 in the Ukrainian Premier League.

=== Chornomorets Odesa ===
In July 2021 he moved on loan to Chornomorets Odesa. On 25 July 2021 he made his league debut against Desna Chernihiv at the Chernihiv Stadium.

== Personal life ==
His father Andriy Tlumak is a retired football player and current manager of Karpaty Lviv and his younger brother Maksym (born 2008) is training with the Karpaty Lviv academy.

== Career statistics ==
=== Club ===
As of 30 January 2022

Appearances and goals by club, season and competition
Club	Season	League			Cup		Continental		Other		Total	
Club	Season	Division	Apps	Goals	Apps	Goals	Apps	Goals	Apps	Goals	Apps	Goals
Karpaty Lviv	2019–20	Ukrainian Premier League	1	0	0	0	—		—		1	0
Karpaty Lviv	Total		1	0	0	0	—		—		1	0
Chornomorets Odesa (loan)	2021–22	Ukrainian Premier League	13	1	2	0	—		—		15	1
Chornomorets Odesa (loan)	Total		13	1	2	0	—		—		15	1
Zorya Luhansk	2021–22	Ukrainian Premier League	0	0	0	0	0	0	—		0	0
Zorya Luhansk	Total		0	0	0	0	0	0	—		0	0
Career total			14	1	2	0	0	0	0	0	16	1
