= Teemu Jäntti =

Finnish footballer (born 2000)

Personal information
- Date of birth: 2 March 2000 (age 26)
- Place of birth: Tuusula, Finland
- Position: Midfielder

Senior career*
Years	Team	Apps	(Gls)
2015–2017	PK Keski-Uusimaa	20	(3)
2018–2020	Lahti	54	(4)
2019-2020	Reipas	2	(0)
2021–2022	Ilves	30	(0)
2023	PK Keski-Uusimaa	7	(1)

International career^{‡}
2015	Finland U15	1	(0)
2015–2016	Finland U16	3	(0)
2016–2017	Finland U17	13	(1)
2017	Finland U18	3	(0)
2018	Finland U19	13	(0)
2019	Finland U21	2	(0)
- * Club domestic league appearances and goals as of 25 December 2024 ‡ National team caps and goals as of 11 June 2019

Teemu Jäntti (born 2 March 2000) is a Finnish former professional footballer who played as a midfielder.

== International career ==
Jäntti represented Finland at the 2018 UEFA European Under-19 Championship.
