= Ihor Karpenko =

Ukrainian footballer

Personal information
- Full name: Ihor Olehovych Karpenko
- Date of birth: 24 September 1997 (age 29)
- Place of birth: Lviv, Ukraine
- Height: 1.83 m (6 ft 0 in)
- Position: Striker

Youth career
- 2011–2014: Karpaty Lviv

Senior career*
Years	Team	Apps	(Gls)
2014–2021	Karpaty Lviv	4	(0)
2018–2020	→ Volyn Lutsk (loan)	40	(7)
2021–2022	Podillya Khmelnytskyi	33	(11)
2022	Akzhayik	10	(0)
2022–2023	Odra Wodzisław Śląski	9	(1)
2023	Narva Trans	16	(0)
2023–2024	Podillya Khmelnytskyi	2	(0)
- * Club domestic league appearances and goals as of 20:13, 27 September 2024 (UTC)

Ihor Olehovych Karpenko (Ukrainian: Ігор Олегович Карпенко; born 24 September 1997) is a Ukrainian professional footballer who plays as a forward.

== Career ==
Karpenko is a product of the Karpaty Lviv school system and then played for Karpaty in the Ukrainian Premier League Reserves and Under 19 championship.

He made his debut for Karpaty as a main-squad player in a home loss to Dynamo Kyiv on 31 July 2019 in the Ukrainian Premier League.

On 11 August 2022, he signed a one-year contract with Polish III liga side Odra Wodzisław Śląski. Nine days later, Karpenko scored his sole goal for Odra on his league debut in a 2–2 away draw against Rekord Bielsko-Biała. On 2 November 2022, he mutually agreed to terminate his contract with Odra.

== Honours ==
Podillya Khmelnytskyi

- Ukrainian Second League runner-up: 2020–21

Narva Trans

- Estonian Cup: 2022–23

Individual

- Ukrainian Premier League U19 top scorer: 2014–15
