= Denys Slyusar =

Ukrainian footballer (born 2002)

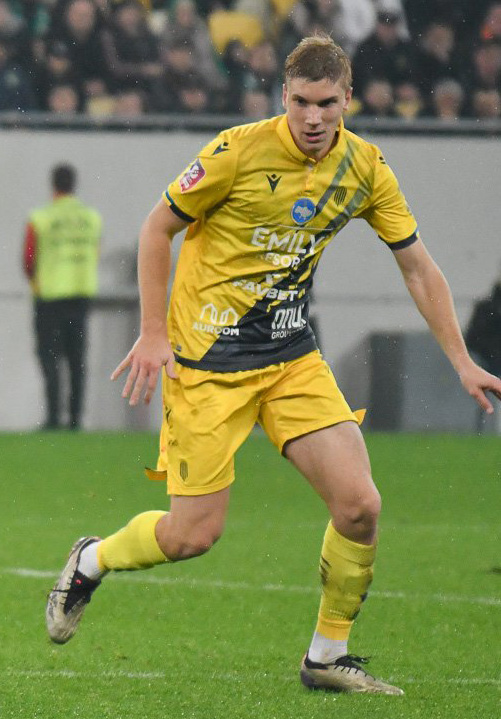
- Denys Slyusar playing for Rukh Lviv in 2024

Personal information
- Full name: Denys Valentynovych Slyusar
- Date of birth: 27 May 2002 (age 24)
- Place of birth: Uzhhorod, Ukraine
- Height: 1.88 m (6 ft 2 in)
- Position: Defender

Team information
- Current team: Rukh Lviv
- Number: 17

Youth career
- 2015–2016: Youth Sportive School Uzhhorod
- 2016–2019: UFK-Karpaty Lviv

Senior career*
| Years | Team | Apps | (Gls) |
| 2019–2020 | Karpaty Lviv | 2 | (0) |
| 2020–26 | Rukh Lviv | 33 | (3) |
| 2023–2024 | → Rukh-2 Lviv | 3 | (0) |
| 2026- | FC Oleksandriya | 2 | (0) |

International career^{‡}
| 2017 | Ukraine U16 | 2 | (0) |
| 2019–2020 | Ukraine U18 | 5 | (1) |
| 2022 | Ukraine U21 | 1 | (0) |
- * Club domestic league appearances and goals as of 28/10/26 @ 12:28(AEST) ‡ National team caps and goals as of 5 October 2025

Denys Valentynovych Slyusar (Ukrainian: Денис Валентинович Слюсар; born 27 May 2002) is a Ukrainian professional footballer who plays as a defender for Rukh Lviv.

== Career ==
Born in Uzhhorod, where his father played for the local Zakarpattia Uzhhorod, Slyusar is a product of the local youth sportive school and the UFK-Karpaty Lviv youth sportive school system.

He played for FC Karpaty in the Ukrainian Premier League Reserves and was ultimately promoted to the senior squad. When Karpaty was relegated into the Ukrainian Second League he continued to play there for a short time before signing with Ukrainian Premier League club FC Rukh Lviv in October 2020. He made his debut for FC Rukh as a starter against MFC Mykolaiv on 21 September 2021 in the Round of 32 of the 2021–22 Ukrainian Cup.

== Personal life ==
He is a son of Ukrainian retired international football player Valentyn Slyusar.
