= Oleh Veremiyenko =

Ukrainian footballer

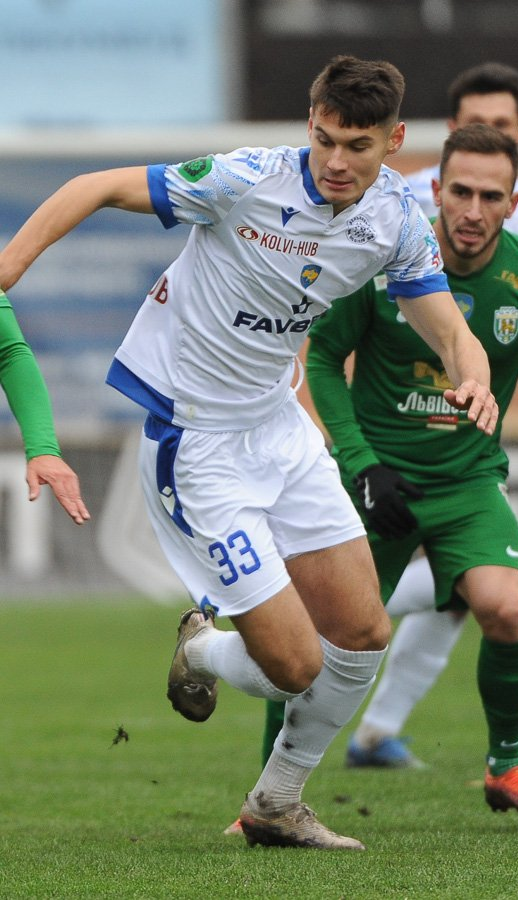

Personal information
- Full name: Oleh Kostyantynovych Veremiyenko
- Date of birth: 13 February 1999 (age 27)
- Place of birth: Novoukrainka, Ukraine
- Height: 1.88 m (6 ft 2 in)
- Position: Defender

Team information
- Current team: SC Poltava
- Number: 33

Youth career
- 201?–2017: UFK Lviv

Senior career*
Years	Team	Apps	(Gls)
2017–2020	Karpaty Lviv	7	(0)
2019	→ Kalush (loan)	7	(0)
2020–2024	Rukh Lviv	1	(0)
2021–2022	→ Podillya Khmelnytskyi (loan)	11	(1)
2023–2024	→ Podillya Khmelnytskyi (loan)	26	(1)
2024–2025	Podillya Khmelnytskyi	22	(0)
2025–	Poltava	19	(2)

International career^{‡}
2017	Ukraine U18	3	(1)
2017–2018	Ukraine U19	4	(0)
2018–2019	Ukraine U20	2	(0)
Medal record
Men's football
Representing Ukraine
UEFA European Under-19 Championship
Bronze medal – third place	2018 Finland
FIFA U-20 World Cup
Winner	2019 Poland
- * Club domestic league appearances and goals as of 3 June 2026 ‡ National team caps and goals as of 10 August 2023

Oleh Veremiyenko (Ukrainian: Олег Костянтинович Веремієнко; born 13 February 1999) is a Ukrainian professional footballer who plays as a defender for SC Poltava.

== Career ==
Veremiyenko is a product of the UFC Lviv School Sportive System.

He was promoted to the main squad of FC Karpaty Lviv, but never made his debut in the Ukrainian Premier League and played for reserves. In February 2019 he signed a one-year loan deal with FC Kalush in the Ukrainian Second League.

== Honours ==
=== Ukraine U20 ===
- FIFA U-20 World Cup: 2019
