= Artem Kozak =

Ukrainian footballer

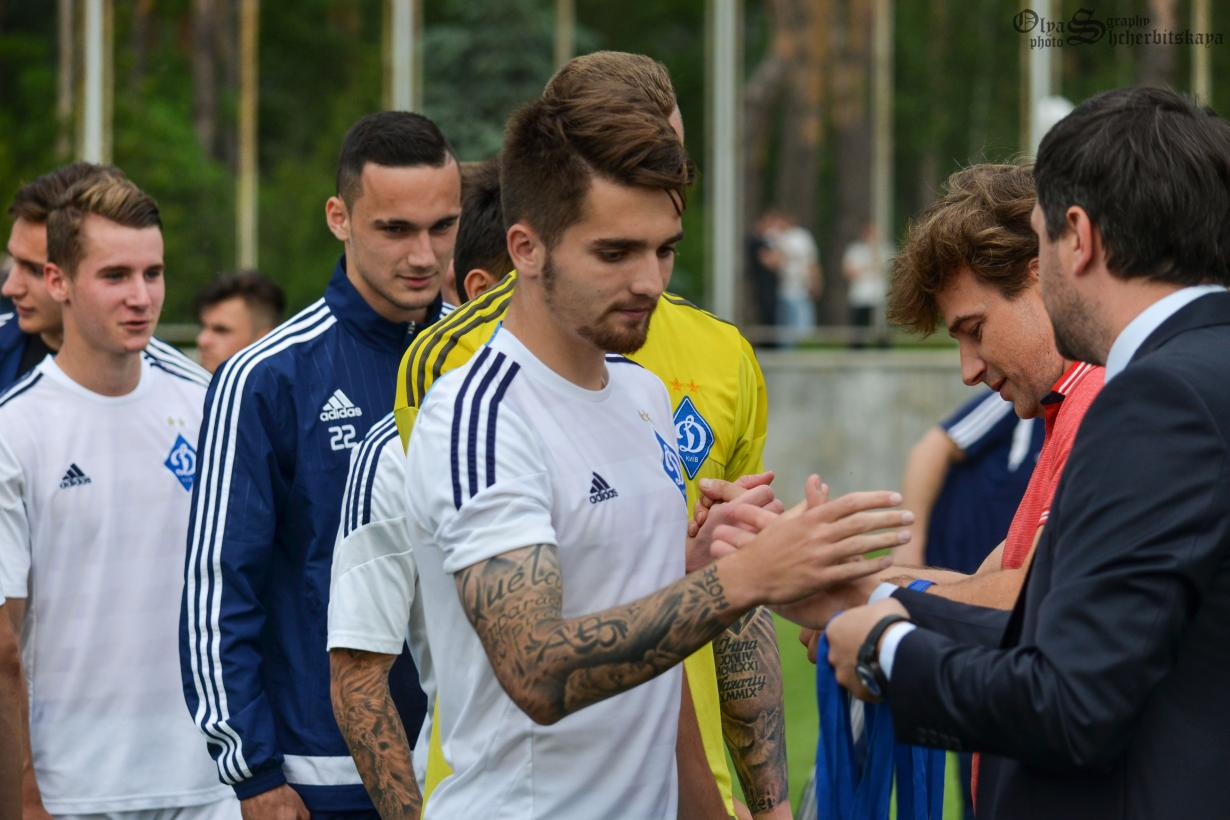

Personal information
- Full name: Artem Romanovych Kozak
- Date of birth: 28 May 1998 (age 28)
- Place of birth: Kovel, Ukraine
- Height: 1.80 m (5 ft 11 in)
- Position: Midfielder

Team information
- Current team: Oleksandriya
- Number: 59

Youth career
- –2013: Dynamo Kyiv
- 2014–2015: BRW-WIK Volodymyr-Volynskyi
- 2016–2018: PAOK

Senior career*
Years	Team	Apps	(Gls)
2014–2016	Dynamo Kyiv	0	(0)
2018–2019	Arsenal Kyiv	4	(0)
2019–2020	Karpaty Lviv	10	(1)
2020–2021	Chornomorets Odesa	20	(3)
2021–2024	Polissya Zhytomyr	60	(13)
2024–26	Oleksandriya	34	(2)
2026-	FC Epitsentr Kamianets-Podilskyi	8	(3)

International career
2015	Ukraine U18	1	(0)
- * Club domestic league appearances and goals as of 20 September 2026 @ 16:11(AEST)

Artem Romanovych Kozak (Ukrainian: Артем Романович Козак; born 28 May 1998) is a Ukrainian professional footballer who plays as a midfielder for Oleksandriya.

== Club career ==
He made his Ukrainian Premier League debut for FC Arsenal Kyiv on 24 February 2019 in a game against FC Desna Chernihiv.

On 20 August 2024, Kozak signed a two-season contract with Oleksandriya.

== Honours ==
Chornomorets Odesa

- Ukrainian First League: 2020-21
