= Kirill Kirilenko =

Belarusian footballer

Personal information
- Date of birth: 8 October 2000 (age 26)
- Place of birth: Minsk, Belarus
- Height: 1.80 m (5 ft 11 in)
- Position: Forward

Team information
- Current team: Dnepr Mogilev
- Number: 88

Youth career
- 2013–2017: Minsk

Senior career*
Years	Team	Apps	(Gls)
2017–2018	Dinamo Brest	11	(0)
2019	BATE Borisov	0	(0)
2019–2020	Karpaty Lviv	4	(0)
2020	Olimpik Donetsk	2	(0)
2021–2022	Torpedo-BelAZ Zhodino	32	(1)
2022–2023	Brașov	7	(0)
2023	Naftan Novopolotsk	21	(2)
2024	Slavia Mozyr	12	(2)
2024	Maxline Vitebsk	15	(8)
2025	Arsenal Dzerzhinsk	8	(3)
2025	Zimbru Chișinău	2	(0)
2025	Slavia Mozyr	5	(0)
2026–	Dnepr Mogilev	12	(5)

International career^{‡}
2016–2017	Belarus U17	5	(2)
2017–2018	Belarus U19	5	(0)
2019–2021	Belarus U21	4	(0)
- * Club domestic league appearances and goals as of 3 July 2026 ‡ National team caps and goals as of 29 March 2021

Kirill Kirilenko (Belarusian: Кірыл Кірыленка; Russian: Кирилл Кириленко; born 8 October 2000) is a Belarusian professional footballer who plays for Belarusian Premier League club Dnepr Mogilev.

== Personal life ==
Kirilenko is of Ukrainian descent.

== Honours ==
Dinamo Brest

- Belarusian Cup winner: 2017–18

BATE Borisov

- Belarusian Cup winner: 2019–20
