= Abukar Mohamed =

Finnish footballer (born 1999)

Personal information
- Full name: Abdulkadir Abukar Mohamed
- Date of birth: 1 January 1999 (age 27)
- Place of birth: Mogadishu, Somalia
- Height: 1.86 m (6 ft 1 in)
- Position: Midfielder

Youth career
- –2014: TPV

Senior career*
Years	Team	Apps	(Gls)
2014–2015	TPV	13	(1)
2016	TPS	21	(1)
2017–2021	Lazio	0	(0)
2019–2020	→ Karpaty Lviv (loan)	1	(0)
2024-	FC Lasten	17	(1)

International career^{‡}
2015–2016	Finland U17	8	(0)
2016–2018	Finland U19	17	(0)
2019	Finland U21	2	(0)
- * Club domestic league appearances and goals as of 19 July 2020 ‡ National team caps and goals as of 12 September 2019

Abdulkadir Abukar Mohamed (Somali: Maxamed Abuukar; born 1 January 1999) is a Finnish footballer who plays as a midfielder.

== Club career ==
Mohamed was born in Mogadishu, Somalia, but at 3 years old emigrated to Tampere with his parents. Mohamed started his career in Finland with TPV U19 and then went on to play for TPS. In 2017 Mohamed got signed by Lazio. In July 2019 signed a one-year loan deal with Ukrainian side FC Karpaty Lviv. In 2024 he signed for FC Lasten in the Finnish 6th tier.
