= Oleksiy Khakhlyov =

Ukrainian footballer (born 1999)

Personal information
- Full name: Oleksiy Oleksiyovych Khakhlyov
- Date of birth: 6 February 1999 (age 27)
- Place of birth: Ostroh, Ukraine
- Height: 1.79 m (5 ft 10 in)
- Position: Central midfielder

Team information
- Current team: SC Poltava
- Number: 99

Youth career
- 2012–2017: Dynamo Kyiv
- 2017–2018: Deportivo Alavés

Senior career*
Years	Team	Apps	(Gls)
2018–2019	Deportivo Alavés B	0	(0)
2018–2019	→ San Ignacio (loan)	21	(1)
2020	Karpaty Lviv	3	(0)
2020–2022	Mynai	44	(2)
2023–2025	Zorya Luhansk	24	(0)
2025–	Poltava	14	(0)

International career^{‡}
2015–2016	Ukraine U17	9	(1)
2016	Ukraine U18	3	(0)
2017–2018	Ukraine U19	13	(0)
2019	Ukraine U20	6	(0)
Medal record
Men's football
Representing Ukraine
UEFA European Under-19 Championship
Bronze medal – third place	2018 Finland
- * Club domestic league appearances and goals as of 24 December 2025 ‡ National team caps and goals as of 12 June 2023

Oleksiy Oleksiyovych Khakhlyov (Ukrainian: Олексій Олексійович Хахльов; born 6 February 1999) is a Ukrainian professional footballer who plays as a central midfielder for SC Poltava.

== Career ==
In 2017, Khakhlyov signed for Spanish La Liga side Deportivo Alavés from the youth academy of Dynamo Kyiv, Ukraine's most successful club. In 2019, he was sent on loan to Club San Ignacio in the Spanish fourth division. For the second half of 2019/20, he signed for Ukrainian team Karpaty Lviv. In 2020, Khakhlyov signed for Mynai in Ukraine. In January 2023 his contract with the club was ended.

In January 2023 he signed for Zorya Luhansk.
