= Lviv State School of Physical Culture =

Sports college in Lviv, Ukraine

Lviv State School of Physical Culture (Ukrainian: Львівське державне училище фізичної культури, ЛУФК) is a sports college located in Lviv.

The school was established in 1971 as a sports boarding school. It also includes a specialized boarding school.

== See also ==
- National University of Physical Education and Sport of Ukraine
